= List of Spanish films of 2026 =

A list of Spanish-produced and co-produced feature films released or scheduled for release in Spain in 2026. When applicable, the domestic theatrical release date is favoured.

== Film openings ==
=== January – March ===
Release		Title (Domestic title)	Cast and crew	Distribution label	Ref.
J A N U A R Y	1	Band Together (Rondallas)	Director: Daniel Sánchez Arévalo Cast: Javier Gutiérrez, María Vázquez, Tamar Novas, Carlos Blanco, Judith Fernández	Beta Fiction	
J A N U A R Y	1	My Amazing Grandma (Abuela tremenda)	Director: Ana Vázquez Cast: Elena Irureta, Toni Acosta	Buena Vista International	
J A N U A R Y	16	El mal	Director: Juanma Bajo Ulloa Cast: Natalia Tena, Belén Fabra, Tony Dalton, Fernando Gil, María Schwinning	39 Escalones Films	
J A N U A R Y	16	The Mysterious Gaze of the Flamingo (La misteriosa mirada del flamenco)	Director: Diego Céspedes Cast: Tamara Cortés, Matías Catalán, Paula Dinamarca	BTeam Pictures	
J A N U A R Y	16	El molino	Director: Alfonso Cortés-Cavanillas Cast: Pilar López de Ayala, Asier Etxeandia, Imanol Arias, Claudia Traisac, Nur Olabarría, Pablo Rivero, Abril Zamora	—N/a	
J A N U A R Y	17	Luger	Director: Bruno Martín Cast: David Sainz, Mario Mayo, Ana Turpin	Filmax	
J A N U A R Y	23	The Virgin of the Quarry Lake (La virgen de la tosquera)	Director: Laura Casabé Cast: Dolores Oliverio, Luisa Merelas, Agustín Sosa	Filmax	
J A N U A R Y	23	Idols (Ídolos)	Director: Mat Whitecross Cast: Óscar Casas, Ana Mena, Claudio Santamaria	Warner Bros. Pictures	
J A N U A R Y	30	Aida, the Movie (Aída y vuelta)	Director: Paco León Cast: Carmen Machi, Paco León, Miren Ibarguren, Eduardo Casanova	Sony Pictures	
J A N U A R Y	30	Dance of the Living (La lucha)	Director: José Alayón Cast: Tomasín Padrón, Yazmina Estupiñán	Sideral Cinema	
F E B R U A R Y	6	To the Max (La fiera)	Director: Salvador Calvo Cast: Carlos Cuevas, Miguel Bernardeau, Miguel Ángel Silvestre	Buena Vista International	
F E B R U A R Y	6	Three Goodbyes (Tres adioses)	Director: Isabel Coixet Cast: Alba Rohrwacher, Elio Germano, Francesco Carril	BTeam Pictures	
F E B R U A R Y	6	The Trail of the Wolf (El rastre del llop)	Director: Ángeles Hernández Cast: Elisabet Casanovas, Andrés Herrera, Carles Francino	Alfa Pictures	
F E B R U A R Y	6	Evolution	Director: Julio Soto Gúrpide, Zayra Muñoz Domínguez.	Beta Fiction	
F E B R U A R Y	13	Evil Dress (El vestido)	Director: Jacob Santana Cast: Belén Rueda, Vera Centenera, Elena Irureta	AF Pictures	
F E B R U A R Y	13	Good Valley Stories (Historias del Buen Valle)	Director: José Luis Guerin	Wanda Visión	
F E B R U A R Y	13	Divine Punishment (Castigo divino)	Director: Pablo Guerrero Cast: Juan Dávila, Natalia Rodríguez, Lolita Flores	Universal Pictures	
F E B R U A R Y	20	My Wife Is a Ghost (El fantasma de mi mujer)	Director: Maria Ripoll Cast: Javier Rey, Loreto Mauleón, María Hervás, Marco Cáceres, Macarena Gómez	A Contracorriente Films	
F E B R U A R Y	20	The Wedding (La boda)	Director: Pedro Cenjor Cast: Elena Furiase, Daniel Chamorro	#ConUnPack	
F E B R U A R Y	20	The Dashed Lines (As liñas descontinuas)	Director: Anxos Fazáns Cast: Mara Sánchez, Adam Prieto	Sideral Cinema	
F E B R U A R Y	20	Balandrau, Where the Fierce Wind Blew (Balandrau, vent salvatge)	Director: Fernando Trullols Cast: Álvaro Cervantes, Bruna Cusí, Marc Martínez	Filmax	
F E B R U A R Y	20	Firebreak (Cortafuego)	Director: David Victori Cast: Belén Cuesta, Enric Auquer, Joaquín Furriel, Diana Gómez	Netflix	
F E B R U A R Y	27	Islands (Islas)	Director: Marina Seresesky Cast: Ana Belén, Manu Vega, Eva Llorach	AF Pictures	
M A R C H	6	The Devil Within (Caminando con el Diablo)	Director: Rubén Pérez Barrena Cast: Marina Salas, Tamar Novas, Iván Marcos, Annick Weerts, Vicente Vergara	Filmax	
M A R C H	6	Fowl Play (Aves de corral)	Director: Antonio Vicent Cast: Chechu Salgado, Diego Anido, Olivia Baglivi	Alfa Pictures	
M A R C H	13	Torrente for President (Torrente, presidente)	Director: Santiago Segura Cast: Santiago Segura, Gabino Diego, Carlos Areces, Ramón Langa	Sony Pictures	
M A R C H	20	Bitter Christmas (Amarga Navidad)	Director: Pedro Almodóvar Cast: Bárbara Lennie, Leonardo Sbaraglia, Aitana Sánchez-Gijón, Patrick Criado, Victoria Luengo, Milena Smit	Warner Bros. Pictures	
M A R C H	20	Agent Zeta (Zeta)	Director: Dani de la Torre Cast: Mario Casas, Mariela Garriga, Luis Zahera	Amazon Prime Video	
M A R C H	27	Better Class (Altas capacidades)	Director: Víctor García León Cast: Marian Álvarez, Israel Elejalde, Juan Diego Botto, Natalia Reyes, Pilar Castro	BTeam Pictures	
M A R C H	27	53 Sundays (53 domingos)	Director: Cesc Gay Cast: Javier Cámara, Carmen Machi, Javier Gutiérrez	Netflix	
M A R C H	27	Another Man (Un altre home)	Director: David Moragas Cast: Lluís Marquès, Quim Àvila, Bruna Cusí	Filmax	

=== April – June ===
Release		Title (Domestic title)	Cast and crew	Distribution label	Ref.
A P R I L	1	Calle Málaga	Director: Maryam Touzani Cast: Carmen Maura, Marta Etura, Ahmed Boulane	Caramel Films	
A P R I L	1	Welcome to Lapland (Lapönia)	Director: David Serrano Cast: Natalia Verbeke, Julián López, Ángela Cervantes, Vebjørn Enger	A Contracorriente Films	
A P R I L	10	The Good Daughter (La buena hija)	Director: Júlia de Paz Cast: Kiara Arancibia, Julián Villagrán, Janet Novás, Petra Martínez	Avalon	
A P R I L	10	An Island Away From You (A una isla de ti)	Director: Alexis Morante Cast: Freddie Dennis, Jaime Zatarain, Julia Martínez, Toni Acosta, Carlos González, Alba Goya	DeAPlaneta	
A P R I L	10	Auri	Director: Violeta Salama Cast: Cristina Marcos, Karra Elejalde	Deep Com Roots	
A P R I L	10	Boulevard	Director: Sonia Méndez Cast: Eve Ryan, Mikel Niso	Sony Pictures	
A P R I L	17	My Dearest Señorita (Mi querida señorita)	Director: Fernando González Molina Cast: Elizabeth Martínez, Anna Castillo, Paco León, Nagore Aranburu, Manu Ríos, Eneko Sagardoy, Lola Rodríguez, María Galiana, Delphina Bianco	Tripictures	
A P R I L	17	Uncle Trouble +2 (La familia Benetón +2)	Director: Joaquín Mazón Cast: Leo Harlem, El Langui, Anabel Alonso	Beta Fiction	
A P R I L	22	The Hanged Woman (La ahorcada)	Director: Miguel Ángel Lamata Cast: Eduardo Noriega, Amaia Salamanca, Cosette Silguero, Norma Ruiz	Filmax	
A P R I L	22	Cool Books (Casi todo bien)	Director: Andrés Salmoyraghi, Rafael López Saubidet Cast: Marcel Borràs, Silma López, Lorenzo Ferro, Secun de la Rosa, Julián Villagrán	AF Pictures	
A P R I L	24	Blue Lights of Benidorm (Después de Kim)	Director: Ángeles González-Sinde Cast: Darío Grandinetti, Adriana Ozores, Christina Rosenvinge	Karma Films	
A P R I L	24	Kraken: The Black Book of Hours (Kraken: El libro negro de las horas)	Director: Manuel Sanabria, Joaquín Llamas Cast: Alejo Sauras, Maggie Civantos, Natalia Rodríguez	Vértice 360	
A P R I L	30	The Righteous (Los justos)	Director: Jorge A. Lara, Fer Pérez Cast: Carmen Machi, Pilar Castro, Bruna Cusí, Vito Sanz, Marcelo Subiotto, Hugo Welzel, Ane Gabarain	Wanda Visión	
M A Y	8	I Won't Die for Love (Yo no moriré de amor)	Director: Marta Matute Cast: Júlia Mascort, Sonia Almarcha, Tomás del Estal, Laura Weissmahr	Elastica	
M A Y	8	Under Your Feet (Bajo tus pies)	Director: Cristian Bernard Cast: Maribel Verdú, Sofía Otero, Urko Olazabal, Ibai Atanes, Zorion Eguileor, Sandra Ferrús	VerCine	
M A Y	8	Tóxico	Director: Lorenzo Lerín Cast: Javier Bódalo, Pedro Casablanc, Lucía Díez	Filmin	
M A Y	15	Pizza Movies	Director: Carlo Padial Cast: Berto Romero, Judit Martín, Bruna Cusí, Raúl Arévalo, Joaquín Reyes, Javier Botet, Miguel Noguera	A Contracorriente Films	
M A Y	15	Hugo 24	Director: Luc Knowles Cast: Arón Piper, Marco Cáceres, Marta Etura, Greta Fernández, Javier Pereira	Caramel Films	
M A Y	15	A Son (Un hijo)	Director: Nacho La Casa Cast: Macarena García, Hugo Silva, Ian Cortegoso, Jesús Carroza	Filmax	
M A Y	22	Cowgirl	Director: Cristina Fernández Pintado, Miguel Llorens Cast: Isabel Rocatti, Carlos Cuevas, Pep Munné, Joaquín Climent	Filmax	
M A Y	29	Runner (Corredora)	Director: Laura García Alonso Cast: Alba Sáez, Marina Salas, Àlex Brendemühl	Elastica	
M A Y	29	Nothing Personal (A la cara)	Director: Javier Marco Cast: Manolo Solo, Sonia Almarcha	Sideral Cinema	
M A Y	29	Mallorca Confidential (Mallorca Confidencial)	Director: David Ilundain Cast: Lolita Flores, Asia Ortega, Jordi Sánchez, Elena Furiase	Filmax	
M A Y	29	Tied Up (La silla)	Director: Ángel de la Cruz Cast: Jaime Lorente	AF Pictures	
M A Y	29	The Marked Woman (La desconocida)	Director: Gabe Ibáñez Cast: Candela Peña, Ana Rujas, Pol López	Tripictures	
J U N E	5	The Light (La luz)	Director: Fernando Franco Cast: Alberto San Juan, Pedro Casablanc, Miguel Rellán, María Galiana, Luis Callejo, Ramón Barea	Buena Vista International	
J U N E	5	A Sucker's Born Every Minute (Cada día nace un listo)	Director: Arantxa Echevarría Cast: Hugo Silva, Susi Sánchez, Dafne Fernández, Diego Anido, Belén Rueda	A Contracorriente Films	
J U N E	5	My Heaven Your Hell (Cel meu, infern teu)	Director: Alberto Evangelio Cast: Sandra Cervera, Tània Fortea, Víctor Palmero, Antonio Hortelano	Benecé	
J U N E	5	All That We Never Were (Todo lo que nunca fuimos)	Director: Jorge Alonso Cast: Maxi Iglesias, Margarida Corceiro, Sebastián Zurita	Warner Bros. Pictures	
J U N E	12	Another League (Pioneras: Solo querían jugar)	Director: Marta Díaz de Lope Díaz Cast: Bruna Lucadamo, Sofía de Iznájar, Leire Aguiar, Daniel Ibáñez, Aixa Villagrán, Elena Irureta	Filmax	
J U N E	12	Flying Colors (Todos los colores)	Director: Beatriz de Silva Cast: Mafalda Carbonell, Sílvia Abril, Iván Luengo	Wanda Visión	
J U N E	12	Iván & Hadoum	Director: Ian de la Rosa Cast: Silver Chicón, Herminia Loh	Avalon	
J U N E	19	Alive (Viva)	Director: Aina Clotet Cast: Aina Clotet, Marc Soler, Lloll Bertran, Naby Dakhli	Caramel Films	
J U N E	26	To Die Is Not Always Good Business (Morir no siempre sale bien)	Director: Claudia Pinto Cast: Tamara Casellas, Ana Wagener, Juan Carlos Vellido, Pau Durà, Carmen Arrufat, Paula Muñoz, Daniel Pérez Prada, Raúl Prieto, Roberto Hoyo, Jorge Motos	Karma Films	
J U N E	26	North to Paradise (Viatge al país dels blancs)	Director: Dani Sancho Cast: Ousman Umar, Emma Vilarasau, Benjamin Kakraba	A Contracorriente Films	

=== July – September ===
Release		Title (Domestic title)	Cast and crew	Distribution label	Ref.
J U L Y	3	9 Moons (9 lunas)	Director: Patricia Ortega Cast: Zack Gómez-Rolls, Jorge Sanz, María León, Kiti Mánver, Sara Sálamo, Fernando Guallar	Caramel Films	
J U L Y	3	Bros (Hermanos)	Director: Carol Rodríguez, Marina Rodríguez Cast: Badr Oubahassou, Pau Márquez	Filmax	
J U L Y	3	Ancestral	Director: Pablo Aragüés, Marta Cabrera Cast: Almudena Amor, Emma Suárez, Luisa Gavasa, Ana Fernández, Consuelo Trujillo	39 Escalones Films	
J U L Y	3	Ladies' Hunting Party (Día de caza)	Director: Pedro Aguilera Cast: Carmen Machi, Blanca Portillo, Rossy de Palma, Zoé Arnao	Sideral Cinema	
J U L Y	3	Magellan (Magallanes)	Director: Lav Diaz Cast: Gael García Bernal, Darío Yazbek Bernal, Ângela Ramos, Rafael Morais	A Contracorriente Films	
J U L Y	10	Love on a Tightrope (Tal vez)	Director: Arima León Cast: Adriana Ugarte, Tania Santana, Antonia San Juan	Deep Com Roots	
J U L Y	10	Haciendo amigos	Director: David Marqués Cast: Antonio Resines, Quim Gutiérrez, Megan Montaner	Sony Pictures	
J U L Y	10	Winnipeg, the Seed of Hope (Winnipeg, el barco de la esperanza)	Director: Beñat Beitia, Elio Quiroga	Barton Films	
J U L Y	24	Three Too Many (Tres de más)	Director: Mar Olid Cast: Kira Miró, Salva Reina, Luna Fulgencio	Warner Bros. Pictures	
J U L Y	24	The Truthers (Los creyentes)	Director: Roger Gual Cast: José Coronado, Stéphanie Magnin, Fanny Gautier, Alberto Olmo	Netflix	
J U L Y	24	The Birthday Party (El anfitrión)	Director: Miguel Ángel Jiménez Cast: Willem Dafoe, Victoria Carmen Sonne, Emma Suárez, Carlos Cuevas	A Contracorriente Films	
J U L Y	24	The Message (El mensaje)	Director: Iván Fund Cast: Anika Bootz, Mara Bestelli, Marcelo Subiotto	BTeam Pictures	
J U L Y	31	Bad Beast (Mala bèstia)	Director: Bàrbara Farré Cast: Maria Schwinning, Iria del Río, Roger Casamajor	A Contracorriente Films	
A U G U S T	7	Last Monkey Standing (El último mono)	Director: Joaquín Mazón Cast: Juan Dávila, Susana Abaitua	Buena Vista International	
A U G U S T	7	The Open Window (La ventana abierta)	Director: Ana Graciani Cast: Unax Ugalde, Adriana Camarena, Mara Guil	A Contracorriente Films	
A U G U S T	14	Summer Days (Días de agosto)	Director: Chema de la Peña Cast: Pau Simon, Berta Galo, Roberto Álamo, Maggie Civantos	Deep Com Roots	
A U G U S T	21	On Fire (A fuego)	Director: Estel Díaz Cast: Zoe Bonafonte, Ruslana, Omar Banana, Marc Soler, Miquel Melero	A Contracorriente Films	
A U G U S T	26	The Beloved (El ser querido)	Director: Rodrigo Sorogoyen Cast: Javier Bardem, Victoria Luengo	A Contracorriente Films	
A U G U S T	26	Tad and the Magic Lamp (Tadeo Jones y la lámpara maravillosa)	Director: Enrique Gato Cast: Óscar Barberán, Michelle Jenner, Luis Posada, Ana Esther Alborg, Petra Martínez, Carlos Latre	Paramount Pictures	
A U G U S T	26	Last Night I Conquered the City of Thebes (Anoche conquisté Tebas)	Director: Gabriel Azorín Cast: Santiago Mateus, António Gouveia, Oussama Asfaraah, Pavle Čemerikić	Begin Again Films	
S E P T E M B E R	4	Operation Cronos (Cronos)	Director: Fernando González Molina Cast: Enric Auquer, Diana Gómez, Mónica López	Beta Fiction	
S E P T E M B E R	4	Swarm (Eixam)	Director: Óscar Bernàcer Cast: Pablo Molinero, Cristina Fernández Pintado	A Contracorriente Films	
S E P T E M B E R	9	Drawn Together (Enfrentados: Marfil)	Director: Óscar Pedraza Cast: Ester Expósito, Hugo Diego Garcia, Eric Masip, Pablo Molinero, Zoe Bonafonte, Lluís Homar, Joaquín Ferreira	Amazon Prime Video	
S E P T E M B E R	11	The Nest (El nido)	Director: Hugo Stuven Cast: Michelle Jenner, Pablo Derqui, Luisa Gavasa	Filmax	
S E P T E M B E R	11	Forastera	Director: Lucía Aleñar Cast: Zoe Stein, Lluís Homar, Núria Prims	Atalante Cinema	
S E P T E M B E R	11	Go Team! (Gracias, equipo)	Director: Diego Núñez Irigoyen Cast: Alexandra Jiménez, Maribel Verdú, Pedro Casablanc, Raúl Tejón, Blanca Martínez, Saturnino García, Pepe Viyuela	Netflix	
S E P T E M B E R	11	Un plan perfecto	Director: María Pulido Cast: Leo Harlem, Jordi Sánchez, Ernesto Sevilla	Sony Pictures	
S E P T E M B E R	11	Lionel	Director: Carlos Saiz Cast: Lionel Corral Bernal, Lionel Corral, Alicia Corral Bernal	Sideral Cinema	
S E P T E M B E R	18	Femení, singular	Director: Xavi Puebla Cast: Vico Escorcia, Nora Navas	Lauren Films	
S E P T E M B E R	25	La bola negra	Director: Javier Ambrossi, Javier Calvo Cast: Guitarricadelafuente, Carlos González, Miguel Bernardeau, Penélope Cruz, Lola Dueñas	Elastica	

=== October – December ===
Release		Title (Domestic title)	Cast and crew	Distribution label	Ref.
O C T O B E R	2	Narciso	Director: Marcelo Martinessi Cast: Diro Romero, Manuel Cuenca, Nahuel Pérez Biscayart	BTeam Pictures	
O C T O B E R	2	Ownerships (Nuda propiedad)	Director: Alberto Utrera Cast: Susana Abaitua, Maxi Iglesias, David Lorente, Pepe Viyuela, Paco Churruca, Stéphanie Magnin	Raabta Pictures	
O C T O B E R	9	The Blind Ants (Inurri itsuak)	Director: Igor Legarreta Cast: Urko Olazabal, Itziar Ituño, Josean Bengoetxea	Buena Vista International	
O C T O B E R	9	Ashes (Ceniza en la boca)	Director: Diego Luna Cast: Anna Diaz, Adriana Paz, Irene Escolar, Luisa Huertas	Avalon	
O C T O B E R	16	La maleta	Director: Carlos Therón Cast: Lucía Caraballo, Alejandro Speitzer, Leonor Watling	Universal Pictures	
O C T O B E R	16	The Bad Son (El mal hijo)	Director: Jaime Lorente Cast: Susi Sánchez, Miguel Ángel Puro, Óscar de la Fuente, Abel de la Fuente, Hugo Arbués	Karma Films	
O C T O B E R	23	Winter Lions (Leones en invierno)	Director: Albert Pintó Cast: Luis Zahera, Roberto Álamo, Luis Callejo, José Manuel Poga	Sony Pictures	
O C T O B E R	23	Arriba tutto	Director: José Mota Cast: José Mota, Pablo Cabello, Karra Elejalde, Olivia Molina	A Contracorriente Films	
O C T O B E R	23	Flies (Moscas)	Director: Fernando Eimbcke Cast: Bastian Escobar, Hugo Ramírez, Enrique Arreola	A Contracorriente Films	
O C T O B E R	30	Karateka	Director: Aritz Moreno Cast: Andrea Ros, Patrick Criado, Mizuki Yoshida	Warner Bros. Pictures	
O C T O B E R	30	This Solitude (Esta soledad)	Director: Javier Giner Cast: Oriol Pla, Marina Salas	Filmax	
O C T O B E R	30	Collision Course (Colisión)	Director: Daniel Sánchez Arévalo Cast: Laia Costa, Karra Elejalde, Luis Zahera, Tamar Novas, Álvaro Cervantes	Netflix	
N O V E M B E R	6	Pray for Us (Ruega por nosotras)	Director: Daniel Monzón Cast: Zoe Bonafonte, Manuela Calle, Adelfa Calvo	Elastica	
N O V E M B E R	6	The Harvester (Sacamantecas)	Director: David Pérez Sañudo Cast: Antonio de la Torre, Patricia López Arnaiz, Josean Bengoetxea, Eneko Sagardoy, Luis Callejo, Urko Olazabal, Haizea Carneros, Fernando Albizu	Buena Vista International	
N O V E M B E R	6	A Pagan Party (Fiesta Pagäna)	Director: Álvaro Brechner Cast: Adrián Lastra, Adrià Modaray, Guillermo Furiase	Eterno Films	
N O V E M B E R	6	11	Director: Clàudia and Paula Serra Cast: Mia Sala-Patau, Pablo Scapigliati, Matías Zocca, Jael Borrás	Alfa Pictures	
N O V E M B E R	13	The Violinist (La violinista)	Director: Raúl García, Ervin Han	Wanda Visión	
N O V E M B E R	13	The Child (El niño)	Director: Mariano Barroso Cast: Karra Elejalde, Belén Cuesta, Pep Ambròs, Raquel Ferri, Joan Solé, Alex Infantes	Tripictures	
N O V E M B E R	20	The Editor (El director)	Director: Dani de la Orden Cast: David Verdaguer, Alberto San Juan, Fernando Colomo, Xavi Sáez, Anna Alarcón, Carmen Machi, Pau Durà, Nacho Fresneda, Emma Vilarasau, Guillermo Toledo, Fernando Cayo	Beta Fiction	
N O V E M B E R	20	The Bad Father (El mal padre)	Director: Roberto Bueso Cast: Eduard Fernández, Adam Jezierski, Francesco Carril, Meritxell Calvo	Caramel Films	
N O V E M B E R	20	Dating in Barcelona (Citas: la película)	Director: Gemma Ferraté Cast: Álvaro Mel, Susana Abaitua, Javier Rey, Paula Malia, Natalia Verbeke, Oriol Pla	Filmax	
N O V E M B E R	20	Hechos probados	Director: Luis Arranz Cast: Amaia Salamanca, Marta Hazas, Ginés García Millán, Aitor Luna, Elena Furiase	Vértice 360	
N O V E M B E R	27	Sisters (Hermanas)	Director: Ione Hernández Cast: Emma Suárez, Elena Anaya	Elastica	
N O V E M B E R	27	A Man on a Bridge (Un hombre en un puente)	Director: David Martín de los Santos Cast: Roger Casamajor, Belén Cuesta, Juanfra Juárez, Font García, Nidia Bermejo	Vértigo Films	
N O V E M B E R	27	Hour and Twenty (Hora y veinte)	Director: Marc Romero Cast: Macarena Gómez, Emma Suárez, Roberto Álamo, Álex Ubago, Boré Buika	A Contracorriente Films	
D E C E M B E R	4	Trinidad	Director: Laura Alvea, José Ortuño Cast: Gabriela Andrada, Paz Vega, Karla Sofía Gascón, Sofía Allepuz, Milena Smit, Alfonso Sánchez, Antonio Dechent	Deep Com Roots	
D E C E M B E R	4	Burundanga	Director: José Corbacho Cast: Adriana Torrebejano, Carol Rovira, Marcel Borràs, Francesc Ferrer, Jordi Sánchez, Sílvia Abril, Santi Millán	Buena Vista International	
D E C E M B E R	4	LocaMente	Director: Fernando García-Ruiz Cast: Dani Rovira, Clara Galle, Karra Elejalde	AF Pictures	
D E C E M B E R	4	Desposados	Director: Vicente Villanueva Cast: Pablo Chiapella, Patricia Conde, Salva Reina, Silvia Alonso, Adrián Lastra, Cristina Castaño, Mario Tardón	Sony Pictures	
D E C E M B E R	11	The Bitch Pack (Salen las lobas)	Director: Claudia Estrada Tarascó	Silencio Cinema	
D E C E M B E R	11	Far From the Trees (Lejos de los árboles)	Director: Meritxell Colell	Sideral Cinema	
D E C E M B E R	11	Proxies (En nombre de otro)	Director: Oriol Paulo Cast: Eduard Fernández, Mario Casas, Blanca Suárez, Nicolás Francella, Alexandra Jiménez	Netflix	
D E C E M B E R	25	It Will Happen Tonight (Sucederá esta noche)	Director: Nanni Moretti Cast: Louis Garrel, Jasmine Trinca, Angela Finocchiaro	BTeam Pictures	

== Box office ==
As of 15 November, the ten highest-grossing Spanish films in 2026, by in-year domestic box office gross revenue, are as follows:

Highest-grossing Spanish films of 2026
Rank	Title	Distributor	Admissions	Domestic gross (€)
1	La bola negra ^{†}	Elastica	5,873,200	39,729,673
2	Torrente for President (Torrente, presidente)	Sony Pictures	3,788,211	28,136,127
3	Tad and the Magic Lamp (Tadeo Jones y la lámpara maravillosa) ^{†}	Paramount Pictures	1,233,283	8,165,286
4	Aida, the Movie (Aída y vuelta)	Sony Pictures	734,956	5,071,590
5	The Beloved (El ser querido) ^{†}	A Contracorriente Films	681,506	4,495,810
6	My Amazing Grandma (Abuela tremenda)	Buena Vista International	404,610	2,814,177
7	Bitter Christmas (Amarga Navidad)	Warner Bros. Pictures	385,730	2,604,157
8	Uncle Trouble +2 (La familia Benetón +2)	Beta Fiction	330,273	2,226,272
9	Idols (Ídolos)	Warner Bros. Pictures	291,712	2,082,165
10	Operation Cronos (Cronos) ^{†}	Beta Fiction	288,745	1,998,045
and † denote films still running in cinemas

== See also ==
- 41st Goya Awards
- List of 2026 box office number-one films in Spain
