= List of LGBTQ-related films of 2025 =

List of 2025 LGBT movies

This is a list of lesbian, gay, bisexual, transgender or queer-related films released in 2025. It contains theatrically released films that deal with important gay, lesbian, bisexual, transgender or queer characters or issues and may have same-sex romance or relationships as a plot device.

== Films ==
Title	Director	Country	Genre	Cast	Notes	Ref
100 Nights of Hero	Julia Jackman	United Kingdom, United States	Drama	Emma Corrin, Nicholas Galitzine, Maika Monroe, Amir El-Masry, Charli XCX, Richard E. Grant, Felicity Jones		
3670	Park Joon-ho	South Korea	Drama	Cho You-hyun, Kim Hyun-mok, Cho Dae-hee, Mi-kyeong Cha		
After the Hunt	Luca Guadagnino	Italy, United States	Thriller, drama	Julia Roberts, Ayo Edebiri, Andrew Garfield, Michael Stuhlbarg, Chloë Sevigny, Lio Mehiel		
Ari	Léonor Serraille	France, Belgium	Drama	Andranic Manet, Pascal Rénéric, Théo Delezenne, Ryad Ferrad, Eva Lallier Juan, Lomane de Dietrich, Mikaël-Don Giancarli, Clémence Coullon		
Assembly	Rashaad Newsome, Johnny Symons	United States	Documentary			
At the Place of Ghosts (Sk+te'kmujue'katik)	Bretten Hannam	Canada	Drama	Forrest Goodluck, Blake Alec Miranda, Glen Gould		
Bearcave (Arkoudotrypa)	Stergios Dinopoulos, Krysianna B. Papadakis	Greece, United Kingdom	Drama			
Between Dreams and Hope	Farnoosh Samadi	Iran	Drama			
Bleat!	Ananth Subramaniam	Malaysia, Philippines, France	Comedy-drama, short			
Blood Lines	Gail Maurice	Canada	Drama	Dana Solomon, Derica Lafrance, Gail Maurice, Tamara Podemski		
Blue Moon	Richard Linklater	United States	Drama	Ethan Hawke, Andrew Scott, Margaret Qualley, Bobby Cannavale		
Brief Somebodies	Andy Reid	Canada	Short drama	Aldrin Bundoc, Matt O'Connor, Noor Kaur Dhandha		
Call Me Mother	Jun Lana	Philippines	Comedy-drama	Vice Ganda, Nadine Lustre		
The Captive (El cautivo)	Alejandro Amenábar	Spain	Drama	Julio Peña, Alessandro Borghi		
Close to September (Casi septiembre)	Lucía G. Romero	Spain	Short drama	Ana Barja, Isabel Rico		
Come See Me in the Good Light	Ryan White	United States	Documentary	Andrea Gibson, Megan Falley		
Constantinopoliad	Sister Sylvester, Nadah El Shazly	Greece, United Kingdom	Immersive VR			
Cora (Gorgonà)	Evi Kalogiropoulou	Greece, France	Drama			
Dark Rooms	Mads Damsbo, Laurits Flensted Jensen, Anne Sofie Steen Sverdrup	Denmark, Germany, Taiwan	Immersive VR short			
The Dashed Lines (As liñas descontinuas)	Anxos Fazáns	Drama	Spain	Mara Sánchez, Adam Prieto		
Degrassi: Whatever It Takes	Lisa Rideout	Canada	Documentary			
Departures	Lloyd Eyre-Morgan, Neil Ely	United Kingdom	Drama			
Dinner with Friends	Sasha Leigh Henry	Canada	Drama	Tattiawna Jones, Izaak Smith, Andrew Bushell, Alex Spencer, Tymika Tafari, Rakhee Morzaria, Michael Ayres, Leighton Alexander Williams		
Downton Abbey: The Grand Finale	Simon Curtis	United Kingdom, United States	Drama	Hugh Bonneville, Laura Carmichael, Phyllis Logan, Robert James-Collier, Jim Carter, Michelle Dockery, Elizabeth McGovern, Imelda Staunton, Penelope Wilton, Paul Giamatti, Joely Richardson, Alessandro Nivola, Simon Russell Beale, Arty Froushan, Dominic West		
Dreamers	Joy Gharoro-Akpojotor	United Kingdom	Drama	Ronkẹ Adékoluẹjo		
Drunken Noodles	Lucio Castro	Argentina, United States	Drama	Laith Khalifeh, Joél Isaac, Ezriel Kornel, Céline Clermontois, John Arthur Peetz, Guillermo García Arriaza, Matthew Risch		
Enigma	Zackary Drucker	United States	Documentary	April Ashley, Amanda Lear		
Enzo	Robin Campillo	France	Drama	Eloy Pohu, Maksym Slivinskyi, Pierfrancesco Favino, Élodie Bouchez		
Erupcja	Pete Ohs	United States, Poland	Drama	Charli XCX, Lena Góra		
Essere Valérie	Simone Cangelosi	Italy	Short documentary	Valérie Taccarelli		
Extra Life (And Decay)	Stéphanie Lagarde	Netherlands, France	Short documentary	Isabelle Lagarde, Stéphanie Lagarde, Suzanne van der Schaaf, Rachele Borghi, Teresa Castro		
Fatherhood	August B Hanssen, Even G Benestad	Norway, Iceland, Germany	Documentary			
A Few Feet Away (A metros de distancia)	Tadeo Pestaña Caro	Argentina	Comedy-drama	Max Suen, Jazmin Carballo		
Heightened Scrutiny	Sam Feder	United States	Documentary	Chase Strangio		
Hot Milk	Rebecca Lenkiewicz	United Kingdom	Drama			
Houses (Batim)	Veronica Nicole Tetelbaum	Israel, Germany	Drama	Yael Eisenberg		
How to Live	Njoroge Muthoni	Kenya	Documentary			
Howl	Domini Marshall	Australia	Short drama	Ingrid Torelli, Kristina Bogic, Safe Shahab, Liam Mollica		
I Only Rest in the Storm (O Riso e a Faca)	Pedro Pinho	Portugal	Drama	Sérgio Coragem, Cleo Diára, Jonathan Guilherme, Jorge Biague, João Lopes, Hermínio Amaro, Paulo Leal		
If You Are Afraid You Put Your Heart into Your Mouth and Smile (Wenn du Angst hast nimmst du dein Herz in den Mund und lächelst)	Marie Luise Lehner	Austria	Short drama	Siena Popović, Mariya Menner, Jessica Paar, Alessandro Scheibner, Alperen Köse, Kathrin Resetarits, Daniel Sea	Teddy Award jury prize winner at the 75th Berlin International Film Festival	
If You Should Leave Before Me	Boyd and J. Markus Anderson	United States	Drama	Shane P. Allen, John Wilcox Tom Noga, Merrick McCartha, Susan Louise O'Connor		
Janine Moves to the Country (Janine zieht aufs Land)	Jan Eilhardt	Germany	Documentary	Janine Lear, Maximilian Brauer, Adrian Wenzel, Kathrin Angerer, Pierre Emö		
Jimpa	Sophie Hyde	Australia, Finland, Netherlands	Drama	John Lithgow, Olivia Colman		
Jone, Sometimes (Jone, batzuetan)	Sara Fantova	Basque Country	Coming-of-age	Olaia Aguayo, Josean Bengoetxea		
Joy (La Gioia)	Nicolangelo Gelormini	Italy	Drama			
Julian	Cato Kusters	Belgium, Netherlands	Drama	Nina Meurisse, Laurence Roothooft		
Kiss of the Spider Woman	Bill Condon	United States	Musical	Diego Luna, Tonatiuh, Jennifer Lopez		
Last Night I Conquered the City of Thebes (Anoche conquisté Tebas)	Gabriel Azorín	Spain, Portugal	Drama	Santiago Mateus, Antonio Martim Gouveia, Oussama Asfaraah, Pavle Čemerikić		
Latin Blood: The Ballad of Ney Matogrosso	Esmir Filho	Brazil	Biographical musical drama	Jesuíta Barbosa, Caroline Abras, Hermila Guedes		
Lesbian Space Princess	Emma Hough Hobbs, Leela Varghese	Australia	Comedy		Teddy Award for Best Queer Feature winner	
The Little Sister (La Petite Dernière)	Hafsia Herzi	France, Germany	Drama	Nadia Melliti, Park-ji Min, Louis Memmi, Mouna Soualem	Winner of the Queer Palm at the 2025 Cannes Film Festival	
Little Trouble Girls (Kaj ti je deklica)	Urška Djukić	Slovenia, Italy, Croatia, Serbia	Drama	Jara Sofija Ostan, Mina Švajger, Saša Tabaković, Nataša Burger, Staša Popović		
Lloyd Wong, Unfinished	Lesley Loksi Chan	Canada	Short documentary		Teddy Award winner for Best Short Film at the 75th Berlin International Film Festival	
Love Letters (Des preuves d'amour)	Alice Douard	France	Drama	Ella Rumpf, Monia Chokri, Noémie Lvovsky, Emy Juretzko		
Love Me Tender	Anna Cazenave Cambet	France	Drama	Vicky Krieps, Antoine Reinartz, Monia Chokri, Vigo Ferrera-Redier, Aurélia Petit, Féodor Atkine		
Magic Farm	Amalia Ulman	United States, Argentina	Comedy	Chloë Sevigny, Alex Wolff, Joe Apollonio, Camila del Campo, Simon Rex		
Manok	Yu-jin Lee	South Korea	Drama			
Maspalomas	Jose Mari Goenaga, Aitor Arregi	Basque Country, Spain	Drama	Jose Ramon Soroiz, Nagore Aranburu	Sebastiane Award winner at the 73rd San Sebastián International Film Festival	
Maya & Samar	Anita Doron	Canada, Greece	Drama			
Michelle Ross: Unknown Icon	Alison Duke	Canada	Documentary	Michelle Ross		
Modern Whore	Nicole Bazuin	Canada	Documentary	Andrea Werhun		
Monk in Pieces	Billy Shebar	United States, Germany, France	Documentary	Meredith Monk, Björk, David Byrne, Ping Chong, John Schaefer		
Montreal, My Beautiful (Montréal, ma belle)	Xiaodan He	Canada	Drama	Joan Chen, Charlotte Aubin		
Move Ya Body: The Birth of House	Elegance Bratton	United States	Documentary			
The Mud Under My Window (Sous ma fenêtre, la boue)	Violette Delvoye	France, Belgium	Animated short	Gabriella Zola, Jasmina Douieb, Stéphanie Coerten		
Mudrasta: Ang Beking Ina!	Julius Ruslin Alfonso	Philippines	Family, Comedy	Roderick Paulate, Elmo Magalona, Tonton Gutierrez, Carmi Martin, Awra Briguela, Celia Rodriguez		
My Boyfriend, the Fascist (My Boyfriend, el fascista)	Matthias Lintner	Italy	Documentary			
My Heaven Your Hell (Cel meu, infern teu)	Alberto Evangelio	Spain	Romantic period drama	Sandra Cervera, Tània Fortea, Víctor Palmero		
The Mysterious Gaze of the Flamingo	Diego Céspedes	Chile, France, Belgium, Spain, Germany	Drama	Tamara Cortés, Matías Catalán, Paula Dinamarca, Claudia Cabezas, Luis Dubó		
The Nature of Invisible Things (A natureza das coisas invisíveis)	Rafaela Camelo	Brazil, Chile	Drama	Laura Brandão, Serena, Larissa Mauro, Camila Márdila, Aline Marta Maia		
A Night Like This	Liam Calvert	United Kingdom	Drama	Alexander Lincoln, Jack Brett Anderson, David Bradley		
Night Stage	Marcio Reolon, Filipe Matzembacher	Brazil	Erotic thriller	Gabriel Faryas, Cirillo Luna		
Old Guys in Bed	Jean-Pierre Bergeron	Canada	Romantic comedy-drama	Paul James Saunders, Duff MacDonald, Joan Hart, Vlasta Vrana		
On the Road	David Pablos	Mexico	Thriller drama	Victor Prieto, Osvaldo Sanchez		
Once Again... (Statues Never Die)	Isaac Julien	United Kingdom	Documentary			
Outerlands	Elena Oxman	United States	Drama	Asia Kate Dillon, Ridley Asha Bateman, Louisa Krause, Daniel K. Isaac, Lea DeLaria		
Parade: Queer Acts of Love and Resistance	Noam Gonick	Canada	Documentary			
Peter Hujar's Day	Ira Sachs	United States	Drama	Ben Whishaw, Rebecca Hall		
Pidikwe	Caroline Monnet	Canada	Documentary	Joséphine Bacon, Catherine Boivin, Catherine Dagenais-Savard, Émilie Monnet, Aïcha Bastien N'Diaye		
Pillion	Harry Lighton	United Kingdom	Drama	Harry Melling, Alexander Skarsgård, Douglas Hodge, Lesley Sharp, Jake Shears, Anthony Welsh		
Plainclothes	Carmen Emmi	United States	Drama	Russell Tovey, Tom Blyth, Amy Forsyth, Christian Cooke		
Queer As Punk	Yihwen Chen	Malaysia, Indonesia	Documentary			
Queerpanorama	Jun Li	United States, Hong Kong	Drama	Jayden Cheung, Erfan Shekarriz, Sebastian Mahito Soukup, Arm Anatphikorn, Zenni Corbin		
Rains Over Babel	Gala del Sol	Colombia, Spain, United States	Comedy-drama	Santiago Pineda, Celina Biurrun, Roman Escobar, Johan Zapata; Saray Rebolledo		
The Richest Woman in the World	Thierry Klifa	France, Belgium	Drama	Isabelle Huppert, Laurent Lafitte, Marina Foïs, Raphaël Personnaz, André Marcon, Mathieu Demy, Joseph Olivennes, Micha Lescot, Paul Beaurepaire		
Sabar Bonda	Rohan Parashuram Kanawade	India, Canada, United Kingdom	Drama	Bhushaan Manoj, Suraaj Suman, Jayshri Jagtap		
Sally	Cristina Costantini	United States	Documentary	Tam O'Shaughnessy, Sally Ride		
Sandbag Dam (Zečji nasip)	Čejen Černić Čanak	Croatia, Slovenia, Lithuania	Drama	Lav Novosel, Andrija Žunac, Leon Grgić, Franka Mikolaci, Tanja Smoje, Alma Prica, Filip Šovagović		
Satanic Sow (Satanische Sau)	Rosa von Praunheim	Germany	Docufiction, comedy	Armin Dallapiccola		
Sauna	Mathias Broe	Denmark	Drama	Magnus Juhl Andersen, Nina Rask, Dilan Amin, Klaus Tange		
Sirens Call	Miri Ian Gossing, Lina Sieckmann	Germany, Netherlands	Documentary	Gina Rønning, Moth Rønning-Bötel, Rei Spider Barnes, Jason Bötel, Mark Ginsberg		
Skin Side Up	Robert Ten Eyck	Australia	Horror			
Stars	Stars Collective	United Kingdom, Germany	Animated short			
Starwalker	Corey Payette	Canada	Musical drama	Dillan Chiblow, Jeffrey Michael Follis, Stewart Adam McKensy, Jason Sakaki, Jennifer Lines		
Strange River (Estrany riu)	Jaume Claret Muxart	Spain, Germany	Drama			
Summer School, 2001	Dužan Duong	Czech Republic	Drama			
Summer's Camera	Divine Sung	South Korea	Drama	Kim Si-a		
Talk Me	Joecar Hanna	Spain, United States	Short drama			
That Summer in Paris (Le Rendez-vous d'été)	Valentine Cadic	France	Comedy-drama	Blandine Madec, India Hair, Arcadi Radeff, Matthias Jacquin, Lou Deleuze		
The Trio Hall	Su Hui-yu	Taiwan	Drama	Hsiao Kurt, Chen Ching, Lai Hao-zhe, Liao Yuan-ching, Yang Chia-en		
Touch Me	Addison Heimann	United States	Sci-fi comedy horror	Olivia Taylor Dudley, Jordan Gavaris, Lou Taylor Pucci, Marlene Forte, Paget Brewster		
Tracy & Martina: Goin' Out West	Brendan Langelle Lyle	Canada	Comedy	Justine Williamson, Greg Vardy		
Two Times João Liberada (Duas vezes João Liberada)	Paula Tomás Marques	Portugal	Drama	June João, André Tecedeiro, Jenny Larrue, Caio Amado, Eloísa d'Ascensão		
Unlabelled	Colette Johnson-Vosberg	Canada	Documentary			
A Useful Ghost	Ratchapoom Boonbunchachoke	Thailand, Singapore, France, Germany	Black comedy	Davika Hoorne, Witsarut Himmarat, Apasiri Nitibhon, Wanlop Rungkumjud, Wisarut Homhuan		
Wake Up Dead Man	Rian Johnson	United States	Mystery, comedy	Daniel Craig, Josh O'Connor, Glenn Close, Josh Brolin, Mila Kunis, Jeremy Renner, Kerry Washington, Andrew Scott, Cailee Spaeny, Daryl McCormack, Thomas Haden Church		
We'll Find Happiness (On sera heureux)	Léa Pool	Canada	Drama	Mehdi Meskar, Alexandre Landry, Aron Archer, Céline Bonnier, Sascha Ley, Jérôme Varanfrain, Joël Delsaut		
The Wedding Banquet	Andrew Ahn	United States	Drama	Lily Gladstone, Kelly Marie Tran, Bowen Yang, Han Gi-chan, Joan Chen, Youn Yuh-jung		
Where the Night Stands Still (Come la notte)	Liryc Dela Cruz	Italy, Philippines	Drama	Jenny Llanto Caringal, Tess Magallanes, Benjamin Vasquez Barcellano Jr.		
Where You Find Me	Willi Andrick, Juan Bermúdez, Isis Rampf, Anna Schröder	Germany	Drama			
