= Mallorca Confidential =

- Theatrical release poster
- Spanish: Mallorca Confidencial
- Directed by: David Ilundain
- Written by: Amèlia Mora
- Produced by: Valérie Delpierre; Luis Ortas
- Starring: Lolita Flores; Asia Ortega; Jordi Sánchez; Moreno Borja
- Cinematography: Alex García Martínez
- Edited by: Mariona Solé Altamira
- Music by: Margaret Hermant
- Production companies: Inicia Films; Cinètica Produccions; Umedia
- Release dates: 11 March 2026 (Málaga); 29 May 2026 (Spain)
- Countries: Spain; Belgium
- Languages: Spanish; Catalan

Mallorca Confidential (Spanish: Mallorca Confidencial) is a 2026 crime thriller film directed by David Ilundain and written by Amèlia Mora. It stars Lolita Flores and Asia Ortega.

== Plot ==
Set in Mallorca in 2007 against the backdrop of the real estate bubble, the plot follows Romani drug queenpin La Chusa, as her narco empire begins to crumble, while her niece Nela, fresh out of prison, vows for revenge.

== Cast ==
- Lolita Flores as La Chusa
- Asia Ortega as Nela
- Jordi Sánchez
- Moreno Borja
- Elena Furiase as Tina
- Pep Tosar as juez Cànoves

== Production ==
The character of Chusa was inspired by the story of Francisca Cortés Picazo, "La Paca". The film was produced by Inicia Films, Cinètica Produccions, and Umedia, and it had the participation of RTVE, Movistar Plus+, 3Cat, and IB3 and backing from ICAA, ICEC, Fundació Mallorca Turisme, the Mallorca Film Commission, and Creative Europe MEDIA.

== Release ==
The film was presented at the 29th Málaga Film Festival on 11 March 2026. It was also programmed at the 10th BCN Film Fest. Distributed by Filmax, it is scheduled to be released theatrically in Spain on 29 May 2026.

== Reception ==
Toni Vall of Cinemanía assessed that the strongest asset of the otherwise "somewhat anemic" film is its classicism, also pointing out that there is a "rampant acting imbalance" separating Flores and Ortega from the rest of the cast.

== See also ==
- List of Spanish films of 2026
