= Operation Cronos =

- Theatrical release poster
- Catalan: Cronos
- Directed by: Fernando González Molina
- Screenplay by: Alberto Marini
- Story by: Nacho Carretero; Arturo Lezcano; Alberto Marini
- Produced by: Núria Valls; Adrián Guerra; Mercedes Gamero; Pablo Nogueroles
- Starring: Enric Auquer; Mónica López; Diana Gómez; Pablo Derqui; Xavi Sáez; Joan Pedrola; Mima Riera; José Pérez Ocaña; Israel Elejalde
- Cinematography: Pau Castejón
- Edited by: Verónica Callón
- Music by: Audrey Ismaël
- Production companies: Nostromo Pictures; Beta Fiction Spain; Hogar Produccion AIE
- Distributed by: Beta Fiction Spain
- Release date: 4 September 2026
- Running time: 118 minutes
- Country: Spain
- Languages: Catalan; Spanish

Operation Cronos (Catalan: Cronos) is a 2026 Spanish thriller drama film directed by Fernando González Molina and written by Alberto Marini based on the police operative set up in response to the 2017 Barcelona attacks. It stars Enric Auquer, Mónica López, and Diana Gómez.

== Plot ==
In the wake of the attack in Las Ramblas in August 2017, the Catalan regional police force (the Mossos d'Esquadra) set up the so-called 'Operation Cronos' to find the perpetrators and prevent another attack.

== Cast ==
- Enric Auquer as Jaume Romeu
- Mónica López as Anna
- Diana Gómez as Daniela
- Pablo Derqui
- Xavi Sáez
- Joan Pedrola
- Mima Riera
- José Pérez Ocaña
- Israel Elejalde

== Production ==
Operation Cronos was produced by Beta Fiction Spain (Mercedes Gamero), Nostromo Pictures (Núria Valls), and Hogar Produccion AIE, in co-production with 3Cat, with backing from RTVE, Movistar Plus+, HBO Max, and support from ICAA and ICEC.

Shooting locations included Vilafranca del Penedès.

== Release ==
Distributed by Beta Fiction Spain, the film was released theatrically in Spain on 4 September 2026.

== Reception ==
Carlos Boyero of El País found the film to be "well shot", "well written", and "well researched".

Eulàlia Iglesias of Ara rated the film 2½ out of 5 stars, lamenting that it "ends up reducing the victims to anonymous corpses that only serve to show the pain of the Mossos".

Philipp Engel of Cinemanía rated the film 3½ out of 5 stars, pointing out that its "biggest drawback is also its raison d'être: confining itself to the perspective of the law enforcement forces".

Juan Pando of Fotogramas rated the film 3 out of 5 stars, considering that the director showcases his craft and the cast delivers.

== See also ==
- List of Spanish films of 2026
