= The Hanged Woman =

- Theatrical release poster
- Spanish: La ahorcada
- Directed by: Miguel Ángel Lamata
- Written by: Mayte Navales
- Produced by: Miguel Ángel Lamata; Raúl García Medrano; Marta Esteban
- Starring: Eduardo Noriega; Amaia Salamanca; Cosette Silguero; Norma Ruiz; Anastasia Fauteck; Cristina Gallego; Emilio Buale
- Cinematography: Teo Delgado
- Edited by: Nacho Blasco
- Music by: Fernando Velázquez
- Production companies: El Árbol y el Ruiseñor AIE; Bemybaby Films; Imposible Films
- Distributed by: Filmax
- Release dates: 16 April 2026 (Cines Palafox); 22 April 2026 (Spain)
- Running time: 91 minutes
- Country: Spain
- Language: Spanish

The Hanged Woman (Spanish: La ahorcada) is a 2026 Spanish supernatural horror thriller film directed by Miguel Ángel Lamata and written by Mayte Navales. It stars Eduardo Noriega and Amaia Salamanca alongside Cosette Silguero.

== Plot ==
Singer-songwriter Rosa Martín commits suicide in the garden of musical producer Fran, the man that she loved but who treated her as a sexual object. Whatever the case, her vengeful ghost stays home, being a nuisance to Fran and the rest of family members. Only Patti, a girl gifted with séance abilities, is able to shed light on the true reach of Evil.

== Cast ==
- Eduardo Noriega as Fran
- Amaia Salamanca as Rosa Martín
- Cosette Silguero as Patti
- Norma Ruiz
- Anastasia Fauteck
- Cristina Gallego
- Raúl Sanz
- Veki Velilla

== Production ==
The screenplay was developed by Mayte Navales based on her own novel La ahorcada. The film was produced by El Árbol y el Ruiseñor AIE, Bemybaby Films and Imposible Films and it had backing from ICAA, RTVE, and Aragón TV. Shooting locations included Teruel (Hogar Comandante Aguado and Castralvo) and Zaragoza.

== Release ==
Filmax acquired international rights to the film. The film had a premiere at the Cines Palafox in Zaragoza on 16 April 2026. Distributed by Filmax, it was released theatrically in Spain on 22 April 2026.

== Reception ==
In a 1-star rating, Manuel J. Lombardo of Diario de Sevilla pointed out that the result is "a uneven and at times laughable journey to nowhere, driven by gory shock moments and a succession of false endings and restarts" touching on every genre trope.

Oti Rodríguez Marchante of ABC of gave the film a 2-star rating, writing it does not provide anything particularly new to the [horror] genre, displaying "a predictable plot, plenty of inconsistencies and a certain psychological depth, albeit somewhat trite".

Daniel Monserrat of El Periódico de Aragón did not feel disappointed and welcomed Lamata's transition to genre cinema.

Sergio F. Pinilla of Cinemanía rated the film 2½ out of 5 stars, considering that it "unsettles and entertains".

== See also ==
- List of Spanish films of 2026
