= Divine punishment (disambiguation) =

Divine punishment is a supernatural punishment by a deity.

It may also refer to:

- The Divine Punishment, an album
- Divine Punishment (film), a film
