= The Wedding (2025 film) =

- Theatrical release poster
- Spanish: La boda
- Directed by: Pedro Cenjor
- Screenplay by: Corinna Salerno; Pedro Cenjor
- Starring: Elena Furiase; Daniel Chamorro; Margarita Lascoiti; Felipe García Vélez; María Jesús Hoyos; Antonio Dechent
- Cinematography: David Cortázar
- Edited by: Nerea Mugüerza
- Music by: José Cuesta
- Production company: El Sueño Eterno Pictures
- Distributed by: #ConUnPack
- Release dates: 15 November 2025 (FICAL); 20 February 2026 (Spain)
- Running time: 103 minutes
- Country: Spain
- Language: Spanish

The Wedding (Spanish: La boda) is a 2025 Spanish drama film directed by Pedro Cenjor starring Elena Furiase and Daniel Chamorro.

== Plot ==
Hairdresser Felisa lives with her mother and gets by thanks to the latter's pension after returning to her hometown from Madrid. Seeking to settle outstanding debts with the local dealer, she begrudgingly accepts a proposal to marry Sebastián (the single son of Adelaida, one of the clients), and so the couple travels to Motril for a honeymoon that would upend their lives.

== Cast ==
- Elena Furiase as Felisa
- Daniel Chamorro as Sebastián
- Margarita Lascoiti as Adelaida
- Felipe García Vélez
- María Jesús Hoyos
- Antonio Dechent

== Production ==
La boda is an El Sueño Eterno Pictures production. Principal photography began on 27 May 2024 in Motril and on 5 June 2024 the production crew moved to Consuegra. Footage was also shot in Madrid.

== Release ==
The film was presented at the Almería International Film Festival (FICAL) on 15 November 2025. ConUnPack Distribución is set to release theatrically the film in Spain on 20 February 2026.

== See also ==
- List of Spanish films of 2026
