= Three Too Many =

- Theatrical release poster
- Spanish: Tres de más
- Directed by: Mar Olid
- Screenplay by: Almudena Vázquez; Efrén Tarifa
- Based on: Tre di troppo by Michele Abatantuono, Fabio De Luigi, and Lara Prando
- Produced by: Gonzalo Salazar-Simpson; Luis Ferrón
- Starring: Kira Miró; Salva Reina; Luna Fulgencio; Ian Cortegoso; Adriana Bidae; Antonio Pagudo; Marta Hazas; David Lorente; Carmen Ruiz; Raquel Guerrero; Félix Gómez; Norma Ruiz; Adam Jezierski
- Cinematography: Luis Ángel Pérez
- Edited by: Vanessa Marimbert
- Music by: Vanessa Garde
- Production companies: Warner Bros. Entertainment España; Lazona; León Cobarde Films
- Distributed by: Warner Bros. Pictures
- Release date: 24 July 2026
- Running time: 98 minutes
- Country: Spain
- Language: Spanish

Three Too Many (Spanish: Tres de más) is a 2026 Spanish fantasy comedy film directed by Mar Olid remaking the 2023 Italian film Tre di troppo. It stars Kira Miró, Salva Reina, and Luna Fulgencio.

== Plot ==
Childless couple formed by Ernesto and Julia are cursed with three children.

== Cast ==
- Salva Reina as Ernesto
- Kira Miró as Julia
- Luna Fulgencio as Sofía
- Ian Cortegoso as Simón
- Adriana Bidae as Marta
- Carmen Ruiz
- David Lorente
- Raquel Guerrero
- Marta Hazas
- Antonio Pagudo
- Félix Gómez
- Norma Ruiz
- Adam Jezierski

== Production ==
Three To Many is a remake of the Italian comedy film Tre di troppo, directed by Fabio De Luigi. The film was produced by Lazona, Warner Bros. Entertainment España and León Cobarde Films AIE, with the participation of Atresmedia and HBO Max.

== Release ==
Distributed by Warner Bros. Pictures, the film was released theatrically in Spain on 24 July 2026.

== Reception ==
Sergio F. Pinilla of Cinemanía rated Three Too Many 3 out of 5 stars, declaring the family comedy to be both "efficient and outlandish".

Juan Pando of Fotogramas rated the film 3 out of 5 stars, writing how Olid directs the film with skill while noting the presence of a rushed and predictable denouement.

Raquel Hernández Luján of HobbyConsolas gave the film a 68-point score, billing it as "a charming comedy with its heart in the right place and a well-chosen cast".

== See also ==
- List of Spanish films of 2026
