= Boulevard (2026 film) =

- Film poster
- Directed by: Sonia Méndez
- Screenplay by: Javier Ruescas
- Based on: Boulevard (novel) by Flor M. Salvador
- Produced by: Anxo Rodríguez
- Starring: Mikel Niso; Eve Ryan; Biel Antón
- Cinematography: Lucía C. Pan
- Edited by: Roddy McDonald
- Music by: Beatriz López-Nogales
- Production companies: Espotlight Media; Maitemindua Zinema; Amets Kalea AIE; Lightbox Animation Studios
- Distributed by: Sony Pictures
- Release date: 10 April 2026
- Country: Spain
- Language: Spanish
- Budget: c. €4 million
- Box office: $3.6 million

Boulevard is a 2026 romantic drama film directed by Sonia Méndez and written by Javier Ruescas based on the Wattpad self-published novel by Flor M. Salvador. It follows the story of two high school outcasts find unexpected connection despite their personal demons as Halsey Weigel (played by Eve Ryan) confronts her own darkness and Luke Howland (played by Mikel Niso) battles addiction.

== Plot ==
Hasley Weigel moves to a new school with her single mother. She meets a smoker at the school named Luke Howland, and is drawn to him. She meets Olivia and her friends, including the popular basketball captain Matt who is instantly attracted to her. Eventually, Matt and Hasley get into a relationship, though Hasley keeps hanging out with Luke, who begins to seem happier following the death of his brother. Hasley attempts to break up with Matt in order to be with Luke, but Matt keeps rebuffing her. Luke and Hasley check off items on their bucket lists and begin to fall in love. Luke opens up and explains that the car accident in which he lost his brother is partially his fault, because he punched his brother and it led to his death. Luke's father and Luke are both worried that pursuing a relationship with Hasley is a bad idea because Luke is messed up and constantly on drugs, but Hasley decides to ignore it. One day while at a club, they are photographed kissing and Matt angrily confronts Hasley the next day, even though she's continuously broken up with him. Matt and Luke get into a fight, and Luke, blinded by anger, accidentally hits Hasley. Following a fall-out with her friends, Hasley learns her mother is accepting a permanent position and won't have to move like they usually do. Hasley distances herself from Luke after his behavior, and the loneliness drives Luke to an overdose. His oldest brother returns from London and tells Luke to come with him to get the help he needs. Luke and Hasley make up after she shares that she is staying, while he is leaving to London. On the night of their high school dance, Luke arrives to give a flower to Hasley before departing, but while crossing the street, is fatally hit by a bus. All of Luke's family, friends, and Hasley tearfully attend his funeral. The movie ends with Hasley packing her bags and visiting her and Luke's secret place one last time.

== Cast ==
- Mikel Niso as Luke
- Eve Ryan as Hasley
- Pepe Barroso as Pol Howland, Luke's older brother
- Biel Antón as Matt
- Enzo Oliver
- Ainara Helguera
- Najwa Khliwa
- Christian Checa
- Jon Lukas
- Brian Vilche
- Claudia Roset
- Luis Zahera as Luke's father
- Esther Acebo as Bonnie Weigel, Hasley's mother

== Production ==
The film was produced by Espotlight Media, Maitemindua Zinema, Amets Kalea AIE, and Lightbox Animation Studios, with the association of Sony Pictures Entertainment Iberia and Webtoon Productions and the participation and backing from Prime Video, Diputación Foral de Bizkaia, and ICAA. It was shot in Biscay.

== Release ==
Sony Pictures is scheduled to release the film theatrically in Spain on 10 April 2026. The debut in Mexican theatres was set for 16 April 2026.

== Reception ==
Elena L. Villalvilla of Infobae decried the constant "blushing" dialogues, while pointing out that the formula can be effective for a target audience formed by viewers who "want to see the characters they once read about in the flesh" and for cringe-watching aficionados.

== See also ==
- List of Spanish films of 2026
