= My Amazing Grandma =

- Theatrical release poster
- Spanish: Abuela tremenda
- Directed by: Ana Vázquez
- Written by: Roberto Jiménez
- Produced by: Juan Moreno; Guillermo Sempere; Koldo Zuazua; Jaime Ortiz de Artiñano
- Starring: Elena Irureta; Toni Acosta; Carla Pastor; Darío Moncloa; Adrián Gámiz; Sofía González; El Pirata
- Cinematography: Andalu V.S.J.
- Edited by: Raúl Cuéllar
- Music by: Fernando Velázquez
- Production companies: Feelgood Media; Kowalski Films; Atresmedia Cine; Abuela Tremenda AIE
- Distributed by: Buena Vista International
- Release date: 1 January 2026
- Country: Spain
- Language: Spanish

My Amazing Grandma (Spanish: Abuela tremenda) is a 2026 Spanish comedy film directed by Ana Vázquez (in her feature debut) and written by Roberto Jiménez. It stars Elena Irureta, Toni Acosta, and Carla Pastor.

== Plot ==
Disruptive and free-spirited grandmother Toñi clashes with her daughter Daniela while the latter is taking her daughter Alexia with her to an event of rural retreat organised by the company she works for.

== Cast ==
- Elena Irureta as Toñi
- Toni Acosta as Daniela
- Carla Pastor as Alexia
- Carlos Serrano
- Santiago Alverú
- Gorka Aguinagalde
- Kandido Uranga
- Esperanza Elipe
- Ramón Ibarra
- Darío Moncloa
- Adrián Gámiz
- Sofía González

== Production ==
The film was produced by Feelgood Media, Kowalski Films, Atresmedia Cine, and Abuela Tremenda AIE and it had the participation of Netflix. It was shot in Biscay (Bilbao, Derio, Durango, Iurreta, Plentzia, Sestao) and the Madrid region (Arganda del Rey, Mataelpino, Madrid).

== Release ==
Distributed by Buena Vista International, it was released theatrically in Spain on 1 January 2026.

== Reception ==
Sergio F. Pinilla of Cinemanía rated the film 2½ out of 5 stars, writing about a "childish and far-fetched" screenplay.

Manuel J. Lombardo of Diario de Sevilla gave the film a 1-star rating, lamenting that it does not manage to get past its premise, and is "trapped in a soporific no man's land".

Quim Casas of El Periódico de Catalunya rated the film 1 out of 5 stars, assessing that, following the steps of the successful Santiago Segura's film franchises, the film consists of a series of predictable situations in a conventional context.

== See also ==
- List of Spanish films of 2026
