= My Heaven Your Hell =

- Theatrical release poster
- Catalan: Cel meu, infern teu
- Directed by: Alberto Evangelio
- Written by: Ana Piles; Noelia Martínez
- Produced by: Javier Abínzano; Alberto Evangelio; Xavier Atance; Xavier Crespo; Xavier Machancoses; Juan Carlos Claver
- Starring: Sandra Cervera; Tània Fortea; Víctor Palmero; Vicent Domingo; Antonio Hortelano; Rosanna Espinós; Enric Benavent
- Cinematography: Guillem Oliver
- Edited by: Alberto Evangelio
- Music by: Joana Subirats Ivern
- Production companies: Beniwood Producciones; Benecé Produccions; Dacsa Produccions
- Distributed by: Benecé
- Release dates: 24 October 2025 (Outshine LGTBQ+); 6 May 2026 (Spain)
- Running time: 101 minutes
- Country: Spain
- Languages: Catalan; Spanish

My Heaven Your Hell (Catalan: Cel meu, infern teu) is a 2025 Spanish romantic period drama film directed by Alberto Evangelio and written by Ana Piles and Noelia Martínez. It stars Sandra Cervera and Tània Fortea alongside Víctor Palmero and Enric Benavent.

== Plot ==
Set in Valencia in the 1960s and 1970s, the plot follows the forbidden romance between two women, Adela and Victoria.

== Cast ==
- Sandra Cervera as Victoria
- Tània Fortea as Adela
- Víctor Palmero
- Vicent Domingo
- Enric Benavent
- Antonio Hortelano
- Rosanna Espinós

== Production ==
The film was produced by Beniwood Producciones, Benecé Produccions, and Dacsa Produccions. It was shot in Valencian and Spanish. Shooting locations included Moncada.

== Release ==
My Heaven Your Hell had its international premiere at the Miami-based Outshine LGTBQ+ Film Festival. The Spanish premiere was programmed for 9 November 2025 at the 5th Endimaris Sitges LGTBIQ+ Festival. Its festival run also included screenings at the Alicante International Film Festival. Distributed by Benecé Distribució, it is scheduled to be released theatrically in Spain on 5 June 2026.

== Reception ==
Salvador Llopart of La Vanguardia rated the film 2 out of 5 stars, lamenting the Lesbian melodrama to be "too contrived to be believable", otherwise singling out the young priest portrayed by Víctor Palmero as, by far, the most interesting element.

== Accolades ==
Year	Award	Category	Nominee(s)	Result	Ref.
2025	8th Lola Gaos Awards	Best Supporting Actor	Víctor Palmero	Won	

== See also ==
- List of Spanish films of 2026
