= Firebreak (film) =

- Promotional release poster
- Spanish: Cortafuego
- Directed by: David Victori
- Screenplay by: Javier F. Echániz; Asier Guerricaechevarría; Jon Iriarte; David Victori
- Starring: Belén Cuesta; Enric Auquer; Joaquín Furriel; Diana Gómez
- Cinematography: Elías M. Félix
- Music by: Federico Jusid
- Production company: Espotlight Media
- Distributed by: Netflix
- Release date: 20 February 2026
- Running time: 107 minutes
- Country: Spain
- Language: Spanish

Firebreak (Spanish: Cortafuego) is a 2026 Spanish psychological thriller film directed by David Victori. It stars Belén Cuesta, Enric Auquer, Joaquín Furriel, and Diana Gómez.

== Plot ==
Widowed Mara trips to a family summer house with her daughter Lide, her sister Elena, her brother-in-law Luis, and her nephew. Lide goes missing in the forest, while the onset of a massive wild fire complicates things.

The movie follows a family staying in a remote forest area when a massive wildfire suddenly breaks out nearby. What starts as a normal day quickly turns into a life-threatening situation.

In the middle of evacuating Lide wanders off and goes missing. Her parents look for her, call out for her. A rescue team is ready to do a search but end up cancelling it due to the fire growing even more dangerous. Elena and Luis set on finding their daughter on their own bump into Santiago, who offers to help search by driving them in his car. Elena makes a discovery and ends up accusing their friend of taking Lide, when they find Lide's bracelet in his car.

Parents Elena and Luis and aunt Mara hold Santiago hostage, believing Santiago has their daughter or did something to her.

As the fire grows tensions grow as well and the desperation of the parents leads to Luis to assault and beat Santiago.

Elena ends up finding her daughter in a hole alive. Elena takes Lide in her arms and ask her how she got there. Lide tells her that she fell. Elena asks if Santiago had anything to do with it. Lide tells her no and they take Lide to the hospital.

Santiago escapes and is on the road asking for help. Luis and Elena pass him on their way to the hospital. Luis stops the car and is visibly upset with what has happened. Santiago gets a ride to the hospital from a good Samaritan.

As the fire spreads uncontrollably, they are forced to evacuate and find safety, but escape becomes difficult due to blocked roads, smoke, and the speed of the flames.

At the hospital Santiago is asked about his wounds and ask who hurt him. He thinks about what to respond and says "it was a bear".

== Cast ==
- Belén Cuesta as Mara
- Enric Auquer as Santiago
- Joaquín Furriel as Luis
- Diana Gómez as Elena
- Candela Martínez as Lide
- Mika Arias as Dani

== Production ==
The screenplay was written by Javier Félix Echániz, Asier Guerricaechevarría, Jon Iriarte, and David Victori. An Espotlight Media production for Netflix, the film was shot in between the province of Segovia and the Community of Madrid. Elías M. Félix worked as cinematographer while Federico Jusid scored the film.

== Release ==
Distributed by Netflix, it was released on streaming on 20 February 2026.

== Reception ==
Manuel J. Lombardo of Diario de Sevilla gave the film a 2-star rating, lamenting the favouring of the "demands of algorithmic entertainment at the expense of plausibility".

Elsa Fernández-Santos of El País deemed Firebreak to be a film "that does not quite catch on".

John Serba of Decider.com gave a negative recommendation, pointing out that the "irritating" suspense in the film is couched with nonsense, as "logic and reason elude these characters".

== See also ==
- List of Spanish films of 2026
