= Lola Flores =

Spanish actress, dancer and singer (1923–1995)

The Most Excellent Lola Flores
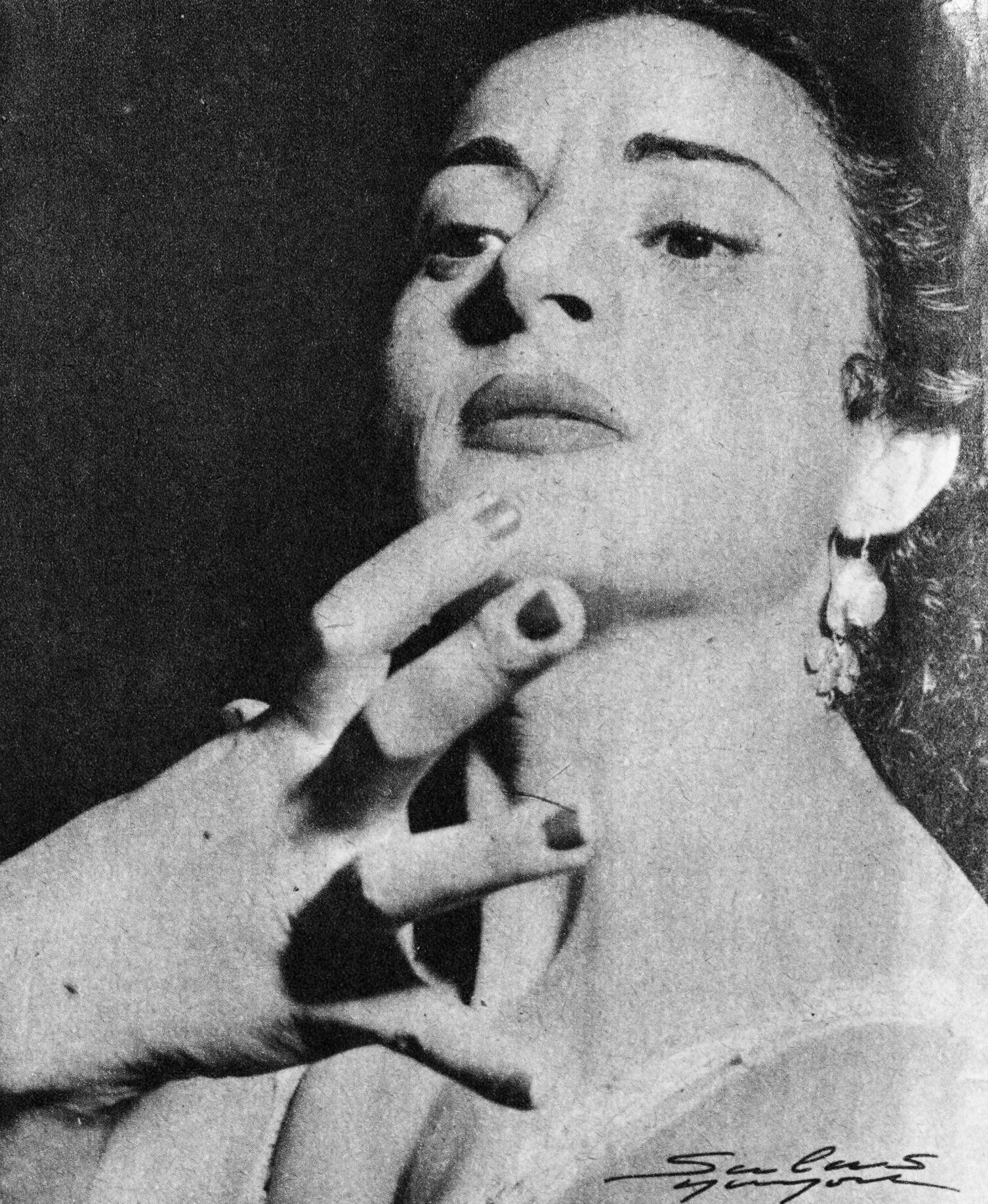
- Flores in 1954
- Born: María Dolores Flores Ruiz; 21 January 1923; Jerez de la Frontera, Andalusia, Kingdom of Spain
- Died: 16 May 1995 (aged 72); Alcobendas, Madrid, Spain
- Resting place: Cementerio de la Almudena, Madrid
- Other names: Lola de España; La Faraona; Torbellino de colores
- Occupations: Singer; actress; dancer
- Years active: 1939–1995
- Notable work: Martingala (1939); Embrujo (1947); Morena Clara (1954); La Faraona (1956); El balcón de la luna (1962); Juana la loca... de vez en cuando (1983); Sevillanas (1992)
- Spouse: Antonio González (m. 1957)
- Partner: Manolo Caracol (1943–1951)
- Children: Lolita; Antonio; Rosario
- Relatives: Alba Flores (granddaughter); Elena Furiase (granddaughter); Quique Sánchez Flores (nephew)
- Awards: Silver Medal of Jerez de la Frontera (1965)
- Musical career
- Genres: Copla; flamenco; pasodoble
- Instrument: Vocals
- Labels: Seeco; Belter; Columbia; CBS; Divucsa

María Dolores "Lola" Flores Ruiz (Spanish pronunciation: [ˈlola ˈfloɾes]; 21 January 1923 – 16 May 1995) was a Spanish actress, bailaora (flamenco dancer) and singer.

Born in Jerez de la Frontera, Flores became interested in the performing arts at a very young age. Known for her overwhelming personality onstage, she debuted as a dancer at age sixteen at the stage production Luces de España, in her hometown. After being discovered by film director Fernando Mignoni, Flores moved to Madrid to pursue a professional career in music and film, with her first gig being the lead role in Mignoni's Martingala (1940). Flores succeeded as a film and stage actress. In 1943 she obtained her breakthrough role in the musical stage production Zambra alongside Manolo Caracol, in which she sang original compositions by Rafael de León, Manuel López-Quiroga Miquel and Antonio Quintero, including "La Zarzamora" and "La Niña de Fuego", mostly singing flamenco music, copla, rumba and ranchera. She then started to receive widespread media coverage.

In 1951, Flores signed a five-film contract with Suevia Films for a value of 6 million pesetas, which became the largest contract for a performing artist in Spanish history. Under that contract she starred in major productions like La Niña de la Venta (1951), ¡Ay, Pena, Penita, Pena! (1953), La Danza de los Deseos (1954) and El Balcón de la Luna (1962), among many others, which spawned the signature songs "A tu Vera" and "¡Ay, Pena, Penita, Pena!". Since then, she was popularly dubbed as la Faraona ("the Pharaoh"). During her life, Flores performed in more than 35 films, pigeonholed, in many of them, in Andalusian folklore. As a bailaora, Flores enraged several generations of continents, although she distanced herself from flamenco canons. She also recorded over twenty albums, which she toured through Europe, Latin America and the United States.

Her strong personality, recognizable image, remarkable professional trajectory and sometimes controversial personal life, have turned Flores into a Spanish pop culture icon. She is often cited as the "biggest exporter of Andalusian culture to date" as well as a "pioneer", being tributed many times in recent television series and documentaries such as the biographical film Lola, the Movie (2007). Lola became the matriarch of what would later be the Flores family, filled with popular singers and television personalities such as Lolita Flores, Rosario, Alba Flores and Elena Furiase. In 1995, Lola Flores died, aged 72, in Alcobendas due to health complications caused by a breast cancer.

== Life and career ==
=== 1923–1950: Early life and career beginnings ===
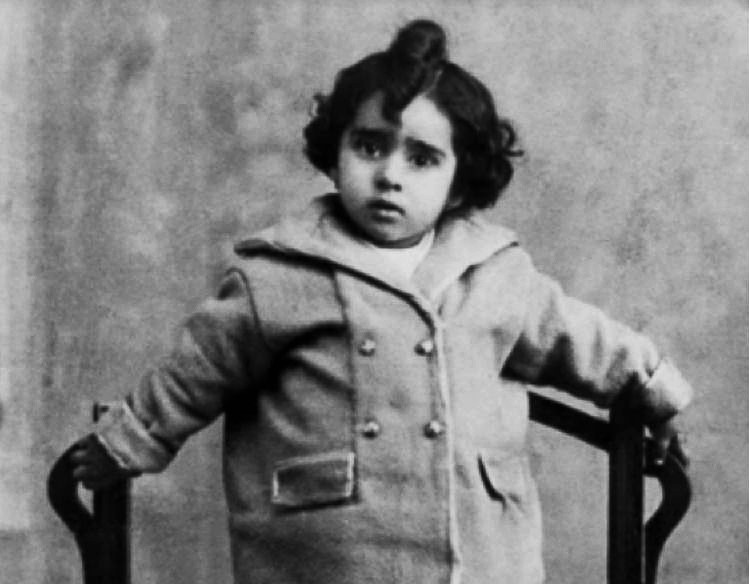
Flores in 1925

Flores was the daughter of Pedro Flores Pinto (1897–1973) and Rosario Ruiz Rodríguez (1901–1989). Her father owned a bar and her mother worked making clothes. She learned to dance with María Pantoja and to understand flamenco with Sebastián Nuñez. Her debut at 16 years of age was with Custodia Romero's company in the Villamarta Theatre of Jerez de la Frontera. Shortly after leaving Jerez for Madrid, she rose to fame and soon signed the most expensive contract of the time (6 million pesetas in the 1950s) which launched her career, touring throughout Latin America.

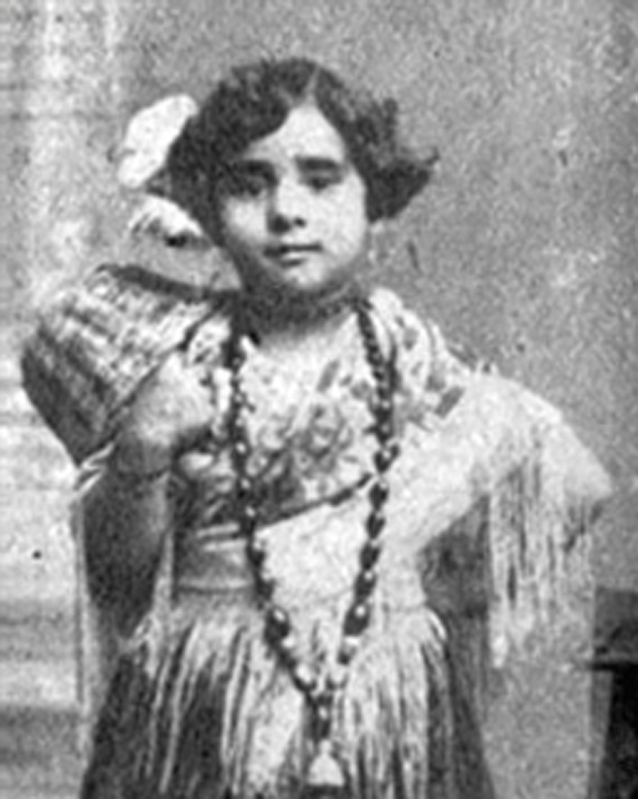
Flores, c. 1930

In 1958, she married Antonio González el Pescaílla, a gypsy guitarist from Barcelona. She had three children: singer and actress Lolita Flores; rock musician, singer and actor Antonio Flores; and singer and actress Rosario Flores. Lola Flores, while one quarter gypsy through her maternal grandfather, Manuel, who was a street vendor, referred to herself as "paya" or non-gypsy Spanish. Nevertheless, she is considered an icon of the Gypsy and Roma community in Spain, particularly since she married into a gypsy family.

"La Faraona" died of breast cancer in 1995, aged 72, and was buried in the Cementerio de la Almudena in Madrid. Shortly after her death, her distraught 33-year-old son, Antonio Flores, committed suicide by overdosing on barbiturates and was buried beside her.

In 2007, the biopic Lola, la película was made. The movie describes her early life, starting in 1931 until 1958.

Lola Flores, a native of Jerez de la Frontera (Cádiz) was an icon of traditional Andalusian folklore, recognized throughout Spain as well as internationally. She became a famous dancer and singer of Andalusian folklore at a very young age, performing flamenco, copla, and chotis and appearing in films from 1939 to 1987.

Her father owned a bar and her mother was a dressmaker. She learned to dance with María Pantoja and to understand Flamenco culture with Sebastián Nuñez. Her debut at 16 years of age was with Custodia Romero's company in the Villamarta Theatre of Jerez de la Frontera. After several spectacles, she went to Madrid.

Shortly after leaving Jerez for Madrid, she rose to fame and soon signed the biggest contract of the time (6 million pesetas in the 1950s) which launched her career touring throughout Latin America.

In 1943, with the protection of business owner Adolfo Arenaza, Flores set out a performance named Zambra with Manolo Caracol, which with small variations would be kept several years with great success. Zambra was decisive for Lola Flores's career, a spectacle very organized in all his elements for the one that they chose to León Quintero and Quiroga and that had her culminating number in "La niña de fuego" and of that there went out also "La Zarzamora", one of the songs most associated with Lola.

The collaboration of the couple, who supported each other in both their private and professional life, led to a relationship that was more than professional reflected on the stage, and was very successful. This eventually lead them to become proper business owners. Together they produced two movies, "Embrujo" (1947) and "La niña de venta" (1951). In 1951, the professional and sentimental separation of the couple started, and they eventually stopped working together.

=== 1951–1960: Career breakthrough and marriage ===
In 1951 the Spanish film producer Suevia films wanted to consolidate a star-system of the Spanish cinema, which had his expansion towards America. The owner, Cesáreo González decided at the end of 1951 to contract Lola Flores. He signed an agreement with Lola Flores for two years and 5 films for an amount of six million pesetas. That contract included cinema, TV, theatre and also a tour along throughout America.

The agreement was signed in Bar Chicote, in Madrid with the cameras of NO-DO, which was a great advertising event. With this agreement, Lola Flores started filming news films like "La niña de la venta", with Ramón Torrado in 1951 and "¡Ay pena, penita, pena!" with Miguel Morayta in 1953. Lola also appeared in advertising campaigns as part of the agreement.

On 12 April 1952, Lola Flores went to Mexico with her family, where she obtained a great reception. From Mexico, she went to Havana, Rio de Janeiro, Ecuador, Buenos Aires and New York. It has gone down in history as an authoritative The New York Times review the following and famous quote that was never really written about her: "Lola Flores, a Spanish artist, she neither sings, and does not even dance, but you can't miss her". This statement has been spread all over the media as if it was true. The Spanish newspaper El País, conducted an investigation on the matter and concluded that it is part of the mythical history of the artist, but that this was never written in the New York Times.

On 27 October 1958, she married Antonio González el Pescaílla (1925–1999), a gypsy guitarist from Barcelona. She had three children: singer Lolita Flores (Dolores González Flores) (1958) Antonio Flores (Antonio Gónzález Flores) (1961–1995); and Rosario Flores (Rosario González Flores) (1963), they were one of the most famous families of artists in Spain. Moreover, Lola Flores was the sister of Carmen Flores (1936), and her nephew was the footballer and coach Quique Sánchez Flores (1965). She is the grandmother of the actress Elena Furiase and Guillermo Furiase (Lolita's children), the actress Alba Flores (Antonio's daughter), known for her role as 'Nairobi' in 'The Money Heist', and Lola Orellana and Pedro Antonio Lazaga (Rosario's children). She was the godmother of Carmen Morales, daughter of the famous singer and actress Rocio Dúrcal.

=== 1960–1995: Decline of copla and legal problems ===
In March 1987, The district attorney's office presented a complaint against the artist and her husband for not having presented the declarations of the income tax between the years 1982 and 1985, they had to pay a bail of 145 million pesetas (€871.561 ). In 1989, The Madrid provincial court decreed her absolution for a legal vacuum motivated by a judgment of the Constitutional Court that had annulled partially the Law of the tax.

Finally, Lola Flores was condemned by the Supreme Court in 1991, as the author of 4 crimes against the Inland Revenue. She was sentenced to two different punishments of a month and a day and two others of seven months in prison, but she would never serve the sentences. The process had an important social transcendence, since she was a very famous person and was chosen by the Inland Revenue as an example of their battle against tax fraud.

== Discography ==
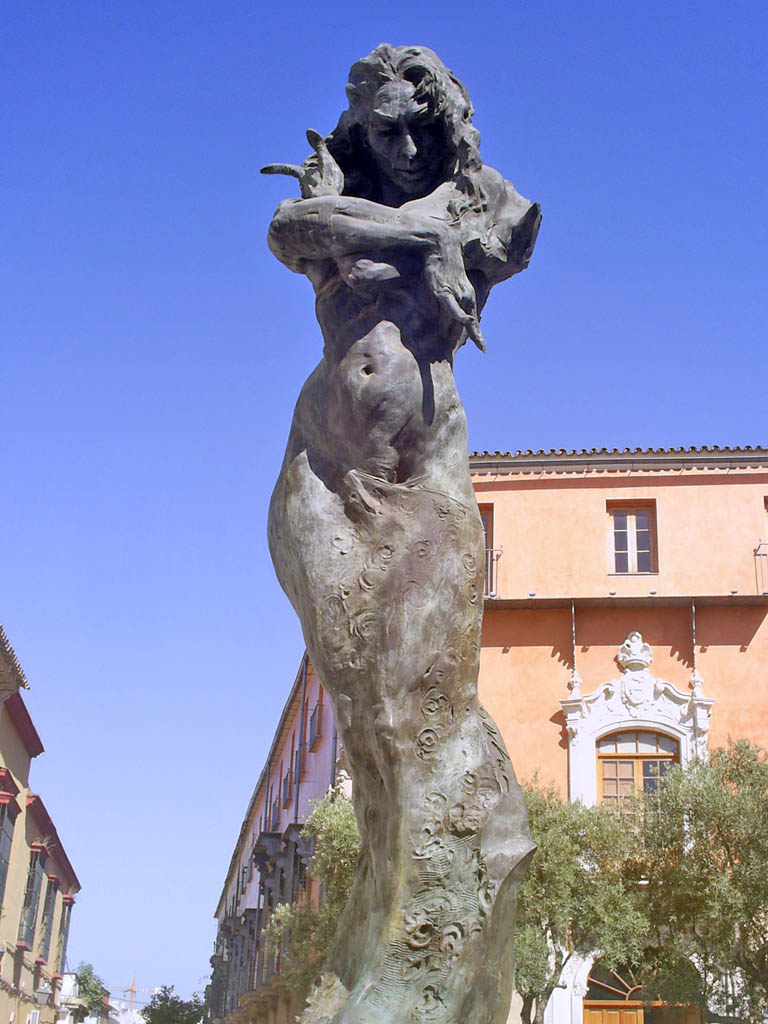
Lola Flores sculpture in Jerez de La Frontera

=== Studio albums ===
- Canta Lola Flores (Seeco Records, 1955)
- ¡Olé! (Seeco, 1957)
- Las Canciones De Lola Flores (Odeon Records, ca. 1959, compilation of La Voz de su Amo recordings, ca. 1954-1958)
- The Toast of Spain (Seeco, 1959)
- La fabulosa Lola Flores (Seeco, 1959)
- Lola Flores y Antonio González (Discos Belter, 1964) (with Antonio González 'El Pescaílla')
- Lola Flores y Antonio González (Discos Belter, 1966) (with Antonio González)
- La guapa de Cádiz (Discos Belter, 1966) (with Antonio González)
- Lola Flores y Antonio González (Discos Belter, 1968) (with Antonio González)
- Lola Flores (Discos Belter, 1969)
- Lola Flores (Discos Belter, 1971)
- Lola Flores (Discos Belter, 1972)
- Lola Flores (Discos Belter, 1973)
- Lola Flores (Discos Belter, 1974)
- Lola Flores (Columbia Gramophone (UK), 1974, compilation of ca. 1946-1962 recordings)
- Diferente Lola (CBS, 1980)
- Homenaje (Epic Records, 1990)

=== Extended plays ===
- Lola Flores recita poemas de Rafael de León (Discos Belter, 1967)

== Cinema ==
Lola Flores took part in 38 films, making her début in 1939 as an actress with the film Martingala by Fernando Mignoni. One of the most remarkable films is a classic from the 40s: Embrujo (1947), Carlos Serrano de Osma), a musical drama where she accompanies Manolo Caracol, who was her boyfriend in those days.

In 1951 she signed a contract with Cesáreo González, and thanks to this partnership she enrolled (starred in) films such as La niña de la venta, with Ramón Torrado, (1951) and ¡Ay pena, penita, pena!, with Miguel Morayta, (1953).

Another of her distinguished films from the 1950s is Morena Clara (1954, Luis Lucia) which was an adaptation of the popular film from 1934, and in company of Fernando Fernán Gómez, El duende de Jerez (1953) and María de la O (1958), she also starred in her first film with Antonio "El Pescaílla" González. Other important films in which this artist took part were El volcán y la brisa, La hermana Alegría in 1954, El balcón de la luna in 1962, Sister San Sulpicio (1962), a new version different from the film in which Imperio Argentina had been involved and the Mexican dramas: La Faraona (1956) and Sueños de oro (1958).

Casa Flora (1972, Ramón Fernández ['Tito Fernández (director)']) and Una señora estupenda (1972, Julio Coll) are two of the most acceptable films of the period known as predestape in the Spanish comedian film industry; after this period she was the protagonist of the comedy Juana la loca... de vez en cuando (1983), where she would represent Isabella I of Castile, a very important Queen during the Spanish Inquisition, Truhanes (1983, Miguel Hermoso). Her last paper in the cinema industry was in 1992 with Sevillanas, whose director was Carlos Saura. In this film, she shared experiences with the most remarkable icons of Flamenco, such as Camarón de la Isla or Rocío Jurado. Her friendship with Carmen Sevilla and Paquita Rico, who were folkloric artists and actresses is very well-known. She took part in different musical tours around South America. She also acted in a film with them: El balcón de la luna (1962, Luis Saslavsky).

=== Mexican cinema: Golden era ===
As well as the Spanish actresses Sara Montiel, Carmen Sevilla and Amparo Rivelles she played different roles in films in Mexico, when this country was living the Golden era of cinema. Lola Flores worked with important celebrities such as Jorge Negrete, Pedro Infante, Antonio Badú, Luis Aguilar "El Gallo Giro" and Miguel Aceves Mejía. She became friends with the well-known actor Mario Moreno "Cantinflas", with Lola Beltrán "La Grande", with the Mexican divas Silvia Pinal and "la doña" María Félix or Dolores del Río.

== Selected filmography ==
Year	Title	Role
1951	The Girl at the Inn	Reyes
1952	Estrella of the Sierra Morena	Estrella
1953	Pain	Carmen
1954	Morena Clara	Trinidad
1956	La Faraona	Soledad Prim Altamirano y Montoya
1962	The Balcony of the Moon	Cora
1983	Juana la loca... de vez en cuando	Isabella I of Castile
1983	Truhanes	Nati

== Television ==
=== Shows ===
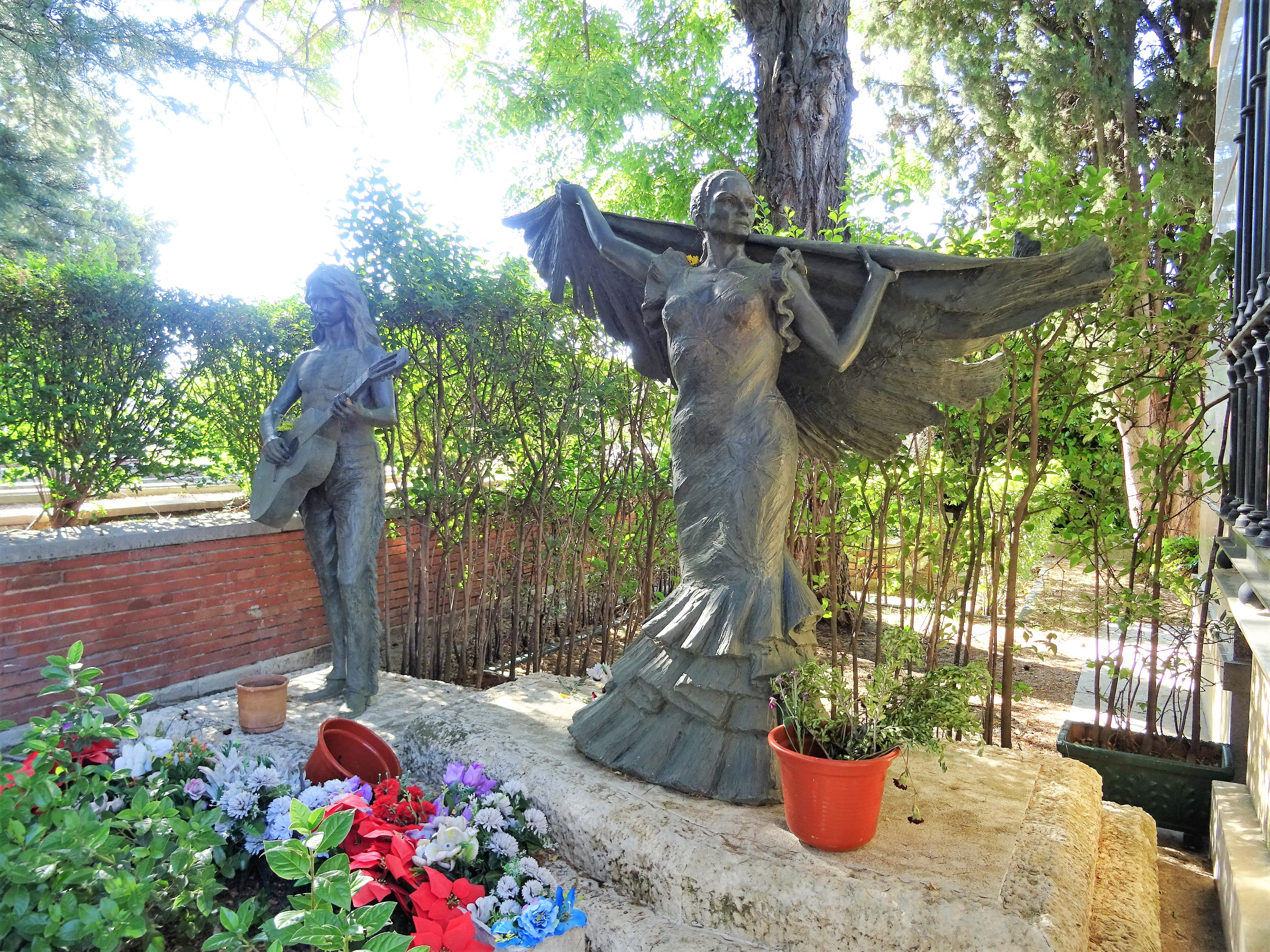
Lola Flores and her son Antonio Flores sculptures, Almudena cemetery, Madrid

Lola participated in different TV programmes throughout her life. Sometimes she sang, others she danced, others she competed and in others she was just interviewed.

When private channels were introduced in Spain in the 90s, Lola took advantage and started to present her first TV programme. She began to make use of this facet, but it would soon end because of her death.

These were the TV programmes that she presented:

- El tablao de Lola (Telecinco) (1992)
- Sabor a Lolas (Antenta 3 TV) (1992–1993) with her daughter, Lolita Flores
- Ay Lola, Lolita, Lola (TVE) (1995) with her daughter, Lolita Flores

Her last programme on Televisión Española (TVE) had to be cancelled in the 9th programme due to her illness, which started to get worse. That show would be the last time she would sing in public. At first, she was supposed to remain standing during her performance, but finally, she had to ask for a chair. She hardly moved her right arm, since it was swollen due to the cancer she suffered.

Her programmes were characterized by the presenters, who were part of the spectacle, in which they sang and danced. During this whole period in television she demonstrated that she did not stop singing and dancing until her last days.

=== Series ===
Lola Flores never took part in a TV series as a protagonist. However, one of the last projects she made was "El coraje de vivir", where she narrated her own life and which had several episodes. She also played an important role in the TV series Juncal in 1988.

These are some of the series where she was invited and in which she played different roles isolated:

- Juncal (TVE) (1988) as Merche.
- Farmacia de guardia (Antena 3 TV) (1993) as Lola Flores acting with her daughter Lolita Flores.
- Los ladrones van a la oficina (Antena 3 TV) (1994) as the gypsy woman Lola, where she acted with her children Lolita and Antonio.
- El coraje de vivir (Antena 3 TV) (1994) as Lola Flores.

== Honors ==
- 2008 – Gold Medal of Merit in Labour (Kingdom of Spain, 1 July 1994).

== Tributes ==
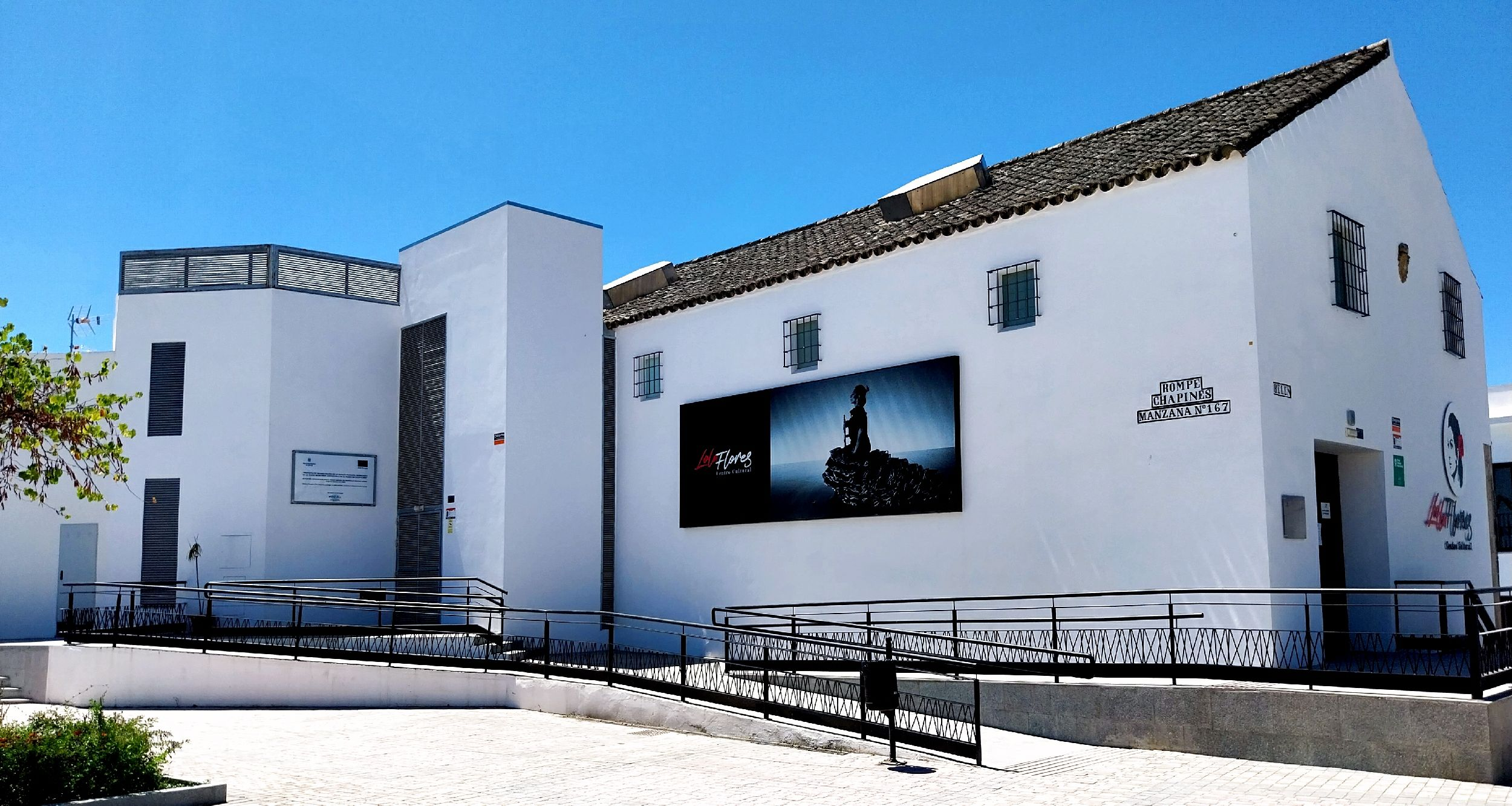
Plaza de Belén with the Lola Flores Cultural Center in Jerez de la Frontera, Spain.

They paid several tributes to her during her life, but the most outstanding is the one they did in Miami in 1990, with the participation of great artists such as José Luis Rodríguez "El Puma", her compatriot Rocío Jurado, his great friend Celia Cruz and the whole family of Lola. In that event Lola participated in all the performances; with Rocío Jurado recorded the song "Dejándonos la piel".

Her last tribute was given by Antena 3 channel in 1994, to which Lola was invited, but she did not perform; she only enjoyed the performances of her friends and family, during that act said his mythical phrase: "Ya puedo morir tranquila" (I can now die calm).

The sisters Salazar, better known as Azúcar Moreno, paid tribute to her with a song that had and has still a great recognition in Spain and the entire world titled "Bailando con Lola".

In her native city, she could not get to inaugurate an avenue in her honor, but she had the opportunity to witness how she was granted, in 1965, the silver medal of Jerez de la Frontera, in thanks for taking the name of his city to all corners of the world. The construction of a museum is being built in her memory in the Palace of Villapanés (next to her monument), which will house bibliography, multimedia and personal objects (dresses and enseres) of the artist. After years of political controversies and funding issues, the Lola Flores museum is finally built near the future location of the Jerez Flamenco museum at the former "Oil Warehouses". It is expected to be open for the second quarter of 2022.

In 2016, the Lara and Cajasol Foundations awarded the Manuel Alvar Prize for Humanistic Studies 2016 to the essay Lola Flores: Otra Historia del Espectáculo en la España Contemporánea by Alberto Romero Ferrer. On 21 January 2016, Google Doodle commemorated her 93rd birthday.

In 2019, a theatre production in Seville performed a biographical jukebox musical featuring Flores' repertoire. Ever since that moment, Lola's daughters Rosario and Lolita have been trying to make a musical about the life of her mother. A script is currently being assessed by them, with a tentative release date for the musical being set for 2023.

In 2021, Movistar+ premiered the documentary series Lola, which revisits the life and legacy of Flores. It features testimonies of 44 international and national performers and academics, including Rosalía, Mala Rodríguez, Miguel Poveda, Nathy Peluso, Lidia García, María José Llergo and C. Tangana among others.

== Death ==
Flores died on 16 May 1995 at her residence "El Lerele" situated in La Moraleja, municipality of Alcobendas (Madrid), at the age of 72, due to breast cancer that had been diagnosed in 1972. Her funeral chapel was installed in the Cultural Center of the Villa (now Teatro Fernán Gómez) of Madrid, in Plaza de Colón (Colón's square). In an open and shrouded coffin with a white blanket, all her admirers and friends could come and see her. She was taken to the Cemetery of the Almudena in Madrid where she was buried. It was one of the burials most remembered by the number of people who came; the funeral was broadcast live on television.

Fifteen days after her death, on 31 May 1995, her son Antonio Flores (aged 33) was found dead in the family residence of "El Lerele".

== See also ==
- Women in dance
