= Divine Punishment (film) =

- Theatrical release poster
- Spanish: Castigo divino
- Directed by: Pablo Guerrero
- Screenplay by: Rubén Tejerina López; Andreu Casanova Pérez
- Produced by: Luis Santamaría; Tedy Villalba
- Starring: Juan Dávila; Natalia Rodríguez; Macarena Gómez; Darío Paso; Lolita Flores; Jorge Albuquerque; Pepón Nieto; Gorka Zufiaurre; Pedro Barbeitos; Jeriel Figueroa; Manuel Fonseca
- Cinematography: José Luis Pulido
- Edited by: Cristina García Aller; Isabel Álvarez de Morales
- Music by: Cláudia Correia
- Production companies: Castigo Divino AIE; Pecaneta Producciones; Apaches Entertainment; Boavista Filmes; La Cochera
- Distributed by: Universal Pictures
- Release dates: 10 February 2026 (Cines Fuencarral); 13 February 2026 (Spain)
- Running time: 91 minutes
- Countries: Spain; Portugal
- Language: Spanish

Divine Punishment (Spanish: Castigo divino) is a 2026 fantasy comedy film directed by Pablo Guerrero (in his directorial debut feature) starring Juan Dávila alongside Natalia Rodríguez and Lolita Flores. It is a Spanish-Portuguese co-production.

== Plot ==
Pedro, a contemptible nurse, receives supernatural powers from a magic box and is mentored by Gael, the artifact's previous bearer.

== Cast ==
- Juan Dávila as Pedro
- Natalia Rodríguez as Paula
- Macarena Gómez as Marta
- Pepón Nieto
- Jeriel Figueroa Ferrera
- Darío Paso
- Lolita Flores
- Jorge Albuquerque
- Gorka Zufiaurre

== Production ==
The film is a Spanish-Portuguese co-production by Castigo Divino AIE, Pecaneta Producciones, Apaches Entertainment, Boavista Filmes and La Cochera, and it had the backing from RTVE.

== Release ==
Divine Punishment had its premiere at Cines Fuencarral in Madrid on 10 February 2026. Distributed by Universal Pictures, the film was released in Spanish theatres on 13 February 2026.

== Reception ==
Manuel J. Lombardo of Diario de Sevilla lamented Dávila to have been stuffed in such a corny story.

Begoña Piña of Cinemanía rated the film 2 out of 5 stars, presenting it as "the first film of the year that does not shy away from exploiting every single cliché".

== See also ==
- List of Spanish films of 2026
