= Winter Lions =

- Theatrical release poster
- Spanish: Leones en invierno
- Directed by: Albert Pintó
- Screenplay by: Juma Fodde
- Based on: Leones en invierno by Carlos Augusto Casas
- Produced by: Álvaro Ariza
- Starring: Luis Zahera; Roberto Álamo; Luis Callejo; José Manuel Poga; Inma Cuesta
- Production companies: Esto también pasará; Bowfinger International Pictures; Glow Animation; Leones en Invierno AIE; Litolux
- Distributed by: Sony Pictures
- Release date: 23 October 2026
- Country: Spain
- Language: Spanish

Winter Lions (Spanish: Leones en invierno) is an upcoming thriller drama film directed by Albert Pintó from a screenplay by Juma Fodde based on the novel by Carlos Augusto Casas. The cast is led by Luis Zahera.

== Plot ==
After an undercover police agent infiltrated in a drug trafficking ring kills a young woman in a car crash and flees from the scene, he begins to take measures so the investigation about the accident leads nowhere. Accountant Hidalgo, the dead woman's father who has a past marked by violence as an Ultras Sur honcho, seeks vengeance.

== Cast ==
- Luis Zahera
- Roberto Álamo
- Luis Callejo
- José Manuel Poga
- Inma Cuesta
- María Romanillos
- Amaia Aberasturi
- Ana Wagener
- Irene Escolar
- Nicolás Furtado
- Jordi Mollà

== Production ==
The screenplay was written by Juma Fodde based on the novel by Carlos Augusto Casas. Pintó billed the film as dealing "about death and violence, the weight of the past, and the impossibility of crossing certain boundaries without suffering harm". It was produced by Esto también pasará and Bowfinger International Pictures alongside Glow Animation, Leones en Invierno AIE and Litolux, with the association of Sony Pictures Entertainment Iberia, and the participation of RTVE, Amazon Prime Video, and Crea SGR. It was shot in Madrid and the Canary Islands.

== Release ==
Distributed by Sony Pictures, Winter Lions is scheduled to be released theatrically in Spain on 23 October 2026.

== See also ==
- List of Spanish films of 2026
