= Elena Irureta =

Spanish actress (born 1955)

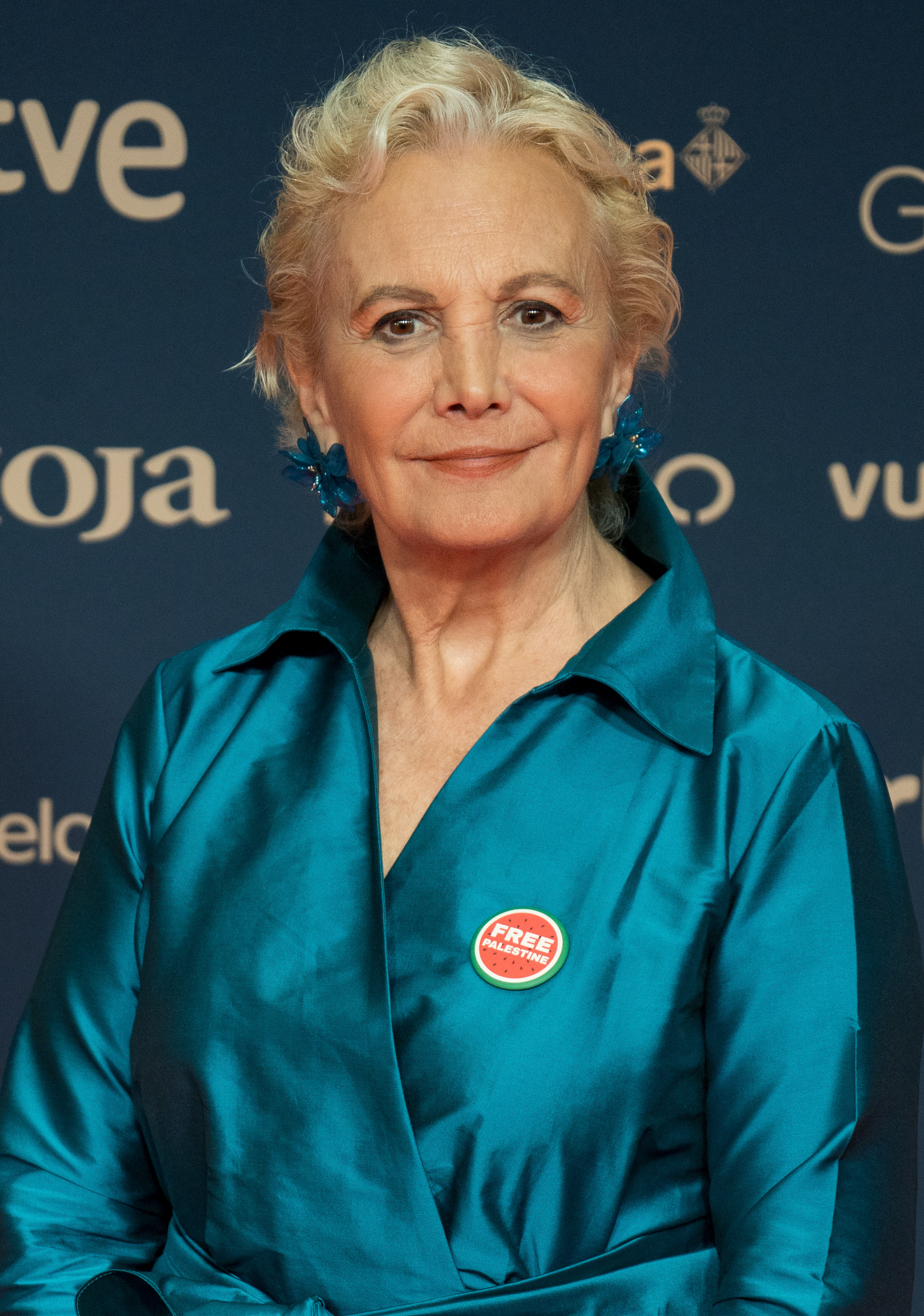
- Irureta in 2026
- Born: Elena Irureta Azanza; 30 July 1955 (age 71); Zumaia, Gipuzkoa, Spain
- Occupation: Actress

Elena Irureta Azanza (born 30 July 1955) is a Spanish actress. She has performed in many Basque- and Spanish-language television productions.

== Biography ==
Elena Irureta Azanza was born in Zumaia (Gipuzkoa) on 30 July 1955. She became a professional stage actress after graduating from the Escuela de Arte Dramático de Antzerti in San Sebastián.

Irureta appeared in films such as Fuego eterno, La monja alférez, El mar es azul, The Dead Mother, Hola, ¿estás sola? or La ardilla roja.

She became known in the Basque television, performing in series such as Bi eta bat, Beni eta Marini, Jaun eta Jabe.

After performing supporting roles in Spain-wide fiction shows (Al salir de clase, Periodistas or Hermanas), she had her breakout role in TV with her 11-season-long performance as Laura Hurtado in the television series El comisario.

== Filmography ==
=== Television ===
Year	Title	Role	Notes	Ref.
1997–1998	Al salir de clase	Socorro		
1999–2008	El comisario	Laura Hurtado	11 seasons	
2003–2009	Martin	Marta Bengoetxea		
2009	Los misterios de Laura	Victoria Conde	Recurring. 6 episodes	
2009–2010	Hospital Central	Candela		
2010	La isla de los nominados	Cuqui Ortiz de Zubiri		
2010	Felipe y Letizia	Pamela Rocasolano	TV movie aired as 2-episode miniseries	
2013	El tiempo entre costuras (The Time in Between)	Doña Manuela		
2014	Ciega a citas	Maruchi		
2015	Algo que celebrar	Concha		
2016	Eskamak kentzen	Xole		
2017	Allí abajo	Rosamari		
2020	Patria	Bittori		
2023	Tú también lo harías	Marga		

=== Film ===
Year	Title	Role	Notes	Ref.
2025	Deaf	Elvira		
2025	Gaua	Graxiana		
2026	Abuela tremenda (My Amazing Grandma)	Toñi		

== Awards and nominations ==
Year	Award	Category	Work	Result	Ref.
2021	26th Forqué Awards	Best Actress in a TV Series	Patria	Won	
2021	8th Feroz Awards	Best Main Actress in a Series	Patria	Won	
2021	8th Platino Awards	Best TV Actress	Patria	Won	
2026	13th Feroz Awards	Best Supporting Actress in a Film	Deaf	Nominated	
2026	81st CEC Medals	Best Supporting Actress	Deaf	Nominated	
2026	40th Goya Awards	Best Supporting Actress	Deaf	Nominated	
2026	34th Actors and Actresses Union Awards	Best Film Actress in a Secondary Role	Deaf	Nominated	
