= Antonio Flores =

Spanish singer-songwriter and actor

- Born: Antonio González Flores; 14 November 1961; Madrid, Spain
- Died: 30 May 1995 (aged 33) Alcobendas, Madrid, Spain
- Genres: Rock; pop; flamenco
- Occupations: Singer; musician; actor
- Instruments: Vocals; guitar; piano
- Years active: 1980–1995

Antonio González Flores (14 November 1961 – 30 May 1995) was a Spanish singer-songwriter and actor. He was Romani on his father's side and maternal grandmother's side.

Antonio is known for his pop rock style of singing. His songs, which he wrote are full of urban poetry, love, nostalgia and experiences, his compositions cover a wide spectrum ranging from rock to ballads, through bossa nova and blues.

He also worked sporadically as an actor, both in television series and in films like Blood and Sand (1989), starring Sharon Stone.

== Family ==
Antonio belonged to one of the most influential performing arts family in Spain. The only son of singers and actors, Antonio González, referred as El Pescaílla, one of the fathers of Catalan Rumba and Lola Flores, popularly known as La Faraona. He was the brother of singer/actresses Lolita Flores and Rosario Flores. He was divorced from Ana Villa, a theatre producer with whom he had a daughter named Alba Flores, who is also an actress.

== Career ==
His first album, Antonio, was released in 1980 and included the hit "No dudaría" and a cover of Joaquín Sabina's "Pongamos que hablo de Madrid". The album was a complete commercial failure. His next two albums, Al caer el sol (1984) and Gran Vía (1988), also passed unnoticed. Despite his unsuccessful attempts, he was encouraged to continue his music career by his sister's album De ley (1992) which he had mostly composed.

In 1994, thanks to the support of his fellow influencing musicians, he was invited to the Gijón concert of the Mucho más que dos (Much more than two) tour, where he sang "Sólo le pido a Dios" (I only ask of God) in a duet with Ana Belén.

He achieved commercial success with his album Cosas mías (1995), which would also be his last.

== Death ==
Shortly after the release of Cosas mías, Flores' mother, Lola Flores, died, sending him into a deep depression. Two weeks after his mother died, he was found dead of a drug overdose. It was ruled a suicide.

== Legacy ==
After Flores' death, his music started to gain recognition. To date, numerous tributes and posthumous reissues have been made of his work.

In 2005, on Antonio' tenth death anniversary, he was posthumously awarded a diamond disc for sales of one million copies sold for his albums. His daughter, Alba Flores received the award.

== Discography ==
- Antonio (1980)
- Al caer el sol (1984)
- Gran Vía (1988)
- Cosas mías (1995)

Posthumous and tributes

- Antología (1996)
- Arriba los corazones (1999)
- Para Antonio Flores (2002)
- 10 años: La Leyenda de un Artista (2005)

== Filmography ==
- El taxi de los conflictos (1969) – De Mariano Ozores hijo
- Colegas (1980) Colegas – De Eloy de la Iglesia
- Calé (1987) Calé – De Carlos Serrano
- Sangre y arena (1989) – De Javier Elorrieta
- La Femme et le pantin (1990) – De Mario Camus
- Cautivos de la sombra (1993) – De Javier Elorrieta y Chechu y familia
