= The Dashed Lines =

- Theatrical release poster
- Galician: As liñas descontinuas
- Directed by: Anxos Fazáns
- Written by: Anxos Fazáns
- Screenplay by: Anxos Fazáns; Ian de la Rosa
- Produced by: Silvia Fuentes; Nuria Landete; Roberto Butragueño; Anxos Fazáns
- Starring: Mara Sánchez; Adam Prieto; Alberto Rolán; Ana Fórneas; Mónica García Cadahía
- Cinematography: Sandra Roca
- Edited by: Diana Toucedo; Laura Piñeiro
- Music by: Xavier Bértolo
- Production companies: Sétima; Sideral
- Distributed by: Sideral
- Release dates: November 2025 (PÖFF); 20 February 2026 (Spain)
- Country: Spain
- Language: Galician

The Dashed Lines (Galician: As liñas descontinuas) is a 2025 Spanish drama film written and directed by Anxos Fazáns. It stars Mara Sánchez and Adam Prieto.

== Plot ==
The plot tracks the relationship between 50 year-old woman Bea (undergoing divorce) and 28-year old trans man Denís (coping with job insecurity and seeking to move from Vigo to Berlin).

== Cast ==
- Mara Sánchez as Bea
- Adam Prieto as Denís
- Alberto Rolán
- Ana Fórneas
- Mónica García Cadahía

== Production ==
The Dashed Lines is a Sétima and Sideral (Elamedia Estudios) production with backing from ICAA, AGADIC, and CRTV. Filming locations in Galicia included Vigo and Marín. It was shot in Galician.

== Release ==
The film had its world premiere in the main competition of the 29th Tallinn Black Nights Film Festival (PÖFF) in November 2025. It was also programmed in the 'Albar' competition of the 63rd Gijón International Film Festival (FICX). Distributed by Sideral, it was released theatrically in Spain on 20 February 2026.

== Reception ==
Veronica Orciari of Cineuropa deemed the film to be "a prime example of a heart-warming work" as well as "an easy watch, in the best sense of the term".

Philipp Engel of Cinemanía rated the film 4 out of 5 stars, declaring it "as lovely as it is melancholic".

Mariona Borrull of Fotogramas rated the film 4 out of 5 stars, assessing it as an "honest and daring" exercise.

== Accolades ==
Year	Award	Category	Nominee(s)	Result	Ref.
2026	24th Mestre Mateo Awards	Best Film		Pending	
2026	24th Mestre Mateo Awards	Best Director	Anxos Fazáns	Pending	
2026	24th Mestre Mateo Awards	Best Actor	Adam Prieto	Pending	
2026	24th Mestre Mateo Awards	Best Actress	Mara Sánchez	Pending	
2026	24th Mestre Mateo Awards	Best Screenplay	Anxos Fazáns, Ian de la Rosa	Pending	
2026	24th Mestre Mateo Awards	Best Cinematography	Sandra Roca	Pending	
2026	24th Mestre Mateo Awards	Best Editing	Diana Toucedo, Laura Piñeiro	Pending	
2026	24th Mestre Mateo Awards	Best Original Score	Xavier Bértolo	Pending	
2026	24th Mestre Mateo Awards	Best Production Supervision	Nati Juncal, Silvia Fuentes	Pending	
2026	24th Mestre Mateo Awards	Best Sound	Xavier Souto, David Machado, Javier Pato	Pending	
2026	24th Mestre Mateo Awards	Best Makeup and Hairstyles	Sonia García	Pending	

== See also ==
- List of Spanish films of 2026
