= Ciega a citas =

Spanish television series

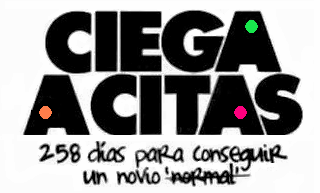
Ciega a citas logo.

Ciega a citas is a Spanish television series produced by Mediaset España Comunicación and Big Bang Media, and aired by Cuatro TV channel. The series is starring Teresa Hurtado de Ory and Álex Gadea. It was released on March 10, 2014, and is inspired by the 2009 Argentine telenovela of the same name.

== Cast ==
- Teresa Hurtado de Ory - Lucía González Soler
- Elena Irureta - Maruchi Soler
- Arancha Martí - Irene Zabaleta Soler
- Joaquín Climent - Zabaleta
- Miguel Diosdado - Rodrigo Carrión
- Belinda Washington - Pilar Aranda Serrano
- Luis Fernando Alvés - Ángel González
- Octavi Pujades - Carlos Rangel
- Álex Gadea - Sergio Feo
- Marta Nieto - Natalia Valdecantos
- Ramón Pujol - Miguel Ayala
- Rubén Sanz - Raúl Estévez
- Rebeca Salas - Críspula "Kris" Soto
- Nico Romero - Simón Lozano
- Jorge Roelas - Adolfo Morcillo
- Adriana Torrebejano as Beatriz
- Pablo Puyol as Alberto

== Awards ==
2010 International Emmy Awards

- Best Telenovela (nominated)
