= Elena Furiase =

Spanish actress

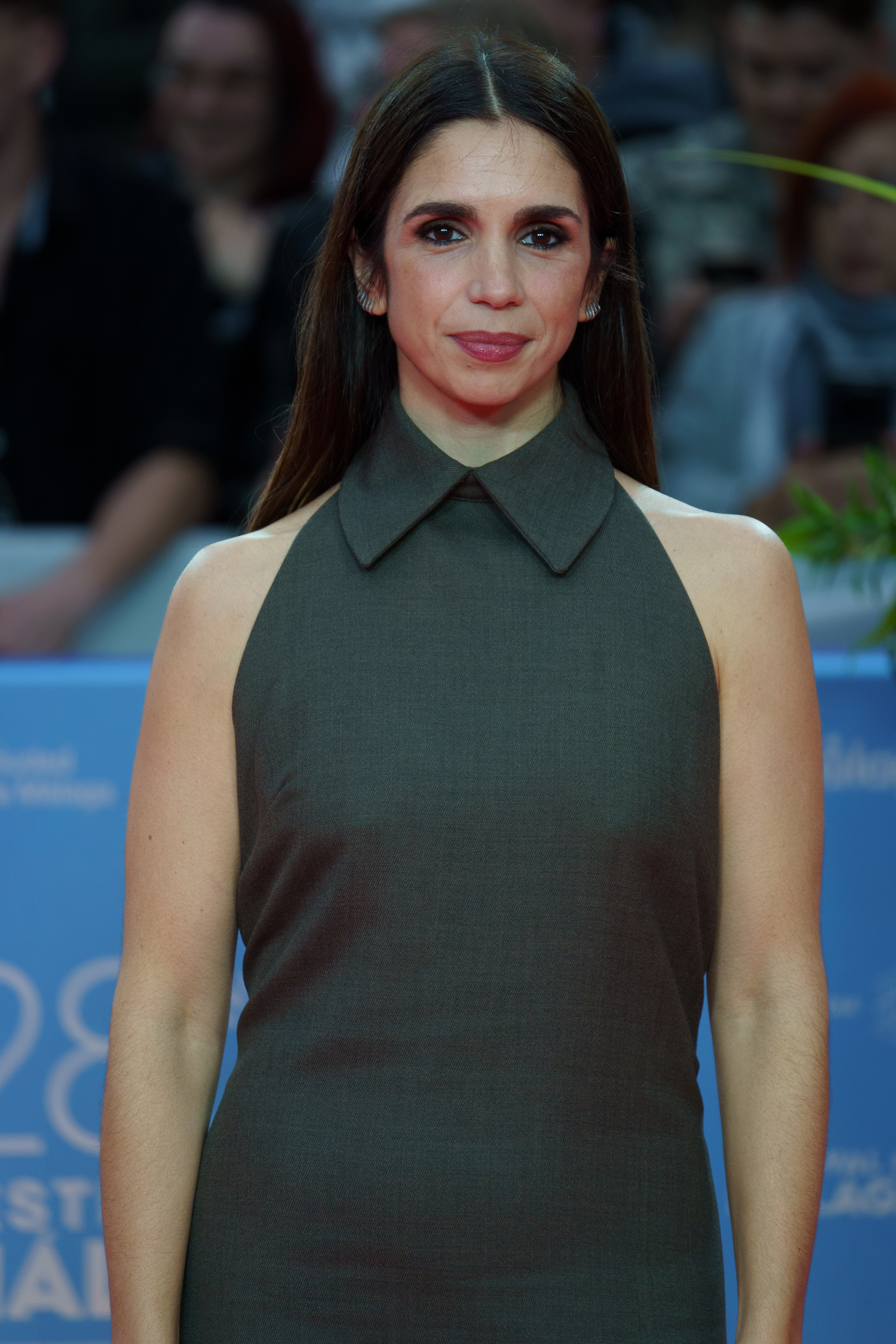
- Furiase in 2025
- Born: Elena Dolores Furiase González; 9 March 1988 (age 38); Madrid, Spain
- Occupation: Actress
- Years active: 2002–present
- Spouse: Gonzalo Sierra Martín-Garea (m. 2021)
- Children: 2
- Mother: Lolita Flores
- Relatives: Lola Flores (grandmother); Antonio Flores (uncle); Rosario Flores (aunt); Alba Flores (cousin); Quique Sánchez Flores (second uncle)

Elena Dolores Furiase González (born 9 March 1988) is a Spanish actress.

== Biography ==
Elena Dolores Furiase González was born on 9 March 1988 in Madrid. She is the daughter of Argentine producer, businessman and representative Guillermo Furiase and of Spanish singer and actress Lolita Flores. She has a younger brother named Guillermo Antonio Furiase González. She belongs to one of the best known families of artists in Spain, Los Flores.

On 19 March 2018, Furiase revealed that she and her partner, Gonzalo Sierra Martín-Garea, were expecting their first baby. On 12 October 2018, she gave birth to the couple's first child, a boy, who was born in Madrid. She married Gonzalo Sierra Martín-Garea on 18 September 2021 in the Dehesa de Montenmedio in Vejer de la Frontera, Cádiz. On 4 July 2022, she gave birth to the couple's second child, a girl.

== Career ==
Elena played the role of Vicky in the famous series of Antena 3, El Internado for three years. During the filming she suffered a cervical sprain after a car accident. She won the Best Actress of the Year Awards Joven 2007 for this role. In September 2008, premiered at the Teatro Amaya (Madrid), the second season of "Forget the Drums" by Ana Diosdado. In the play, directed by Victor Conde, Elena played the role of Fury (Alicia).

On 14 November 2008 El libro de las aguas, directed by Antonio Gimenez-Rico, debuted, based on the book of the same name by Alejandro Lopez Andrada. Elena plays Amalia. In early 2009 she appeared in the video clip "La Lola". The song is dedicated to her grandmother, "La Faraona" (the Pharaoh).

In May 2009, she was the face of the footwear brand "Coolway". In August 2009, she participated in the film Bad People. In November 2009, she appeared on the cover of the Spanish edition of FHM magazine. In 2013, she joined the eighth season of Amar en tiempos revueltos.

== Filmography ==
=== Theater ===
Year	Title	Character	Director	Theater
2002	Teatro fantástico	Colombina	Ainhoa Amestoy d'Ors	
2004	Un beso para la bailarina verde o cómo perderse en el Thyssen	Girasoles	Ainhoa Amestoy d'Ors	
2006	En alta mar	Grande	Ainhoa Amestoy d'Ors	
2008–2009	Olvida los tambores	Alicia	Víctor Conde	
2011	Dial M for Murder	Margot Mary Wendice	Víctor Conde	

=== Television ===
Year	Title	Character	Channel	Notes
2007–2010	El Internado	Victoria "Vicky" Martínez González	Antena 3	71 episodes
2012	Imperium	Petra	Antena 3	1 episode
2012	Sombras	Aly	Movistar+	5 episodes
2013	Amar es para siempre	Olga Lozano	Antena 3	48 episodes
2015	Gym Tony	Paula	Cuatro	1 episode
2016	Cuéntame cómo pasó	Gracia	La 1	1 episode
2016	El ministerio del tiempo	Micaela Amaya	La 1	1 episode
2016–2017	¿Qué fue de Jorge Sanz?	Elena	Movistar+	2 episodes
2018	Centro médico	Dr. Eva Soria	La 1	62 episodes
2018	Arde Madrid	Carmen Mateo	Movistar+	1 episode

=== Movies ===
Year	Movie	Character	Director	Notes
2008	El libro de las aguas	Amalia	Antonio Giménez-Rico	
2010	Cruzando el límite	Sandra	Xavi Giménez	
2010	The Anguish	Martina	Jordi Mesa González	
2010	Don Mendo Rock ¿La venganza?	Jazmín	José Luis García Sánchez	
2011	Muchas vidas: El manejo del vidrio	Chief Operating Officer	Pilar Gutiérrez	Short film
2012	Rotos	Girl #1	Robert Pérez Toledo	Short film
2012	Cuándo la luz roja se apague	Sara	Jerónimo Cantero	Short film
2012	Síndromes, vol.1: Estocolmo	Luna	Sergio González	Short film
2013	Diente por diente	Julia	Álvaro P. Soler	Short film
2013	Un dios prohibido	Trini	Pablo Moreno	
2014	Caracol	Mother	Román Reyes	Short film
2014	Creo que te quiero	Laura	Lucía Forner Segarra	Short film
2015	En camino	Paula	Angelo Khemlani	Short film
2015	Yo no he sido	Alba	Ángel Ripalda	Short film
2016	Luz de Soledad	Magdalena	Pablo Moreno	
2016	Harvey Johnson	Captain Carter	Víctor López Muñoz	
2016	Poveda	Pepita Segovia	Pablo Moreno	
2016	Tu último día	María	Arturo García Zamudio	Short film
2020	Rosalinda	Celia	Ramón Luque Cózar	
2020	Vampus Horror Tales	Marta	Manuel Martínez Velasco	

=== Television programs ===
Year	Program	Channel	Notes
2008	Password	Cuatro	Guest
2014	Todo va bien	Cuatro	Collaborator
2015	En la tuya o en la mía	La 1	Guest with Lolita Flores
2015	Telepasión española	La 1	Guest
2015	Menuda noche	Canal Sur	Guest
2015	Top Chef	Antena 3	Guest
2017	El gran reto musical	La 1	Guest
2018	Viajeras con B	Ten	Host
2018	Your Face Sounds Familiar: Christmas Special	Antena 3	Judge
2018	Dicho y hecho	La 1	Participant
2018	Crush: la pasta te aplasta	La 1	Participant
2018	Lazos de sangre	La 1	Guest
2019	MasterChef Celebrity	La 1	Participant
2019	Vuelta al cole	Telemadrid	Guest
2019	Gente maravillosa	CMM TV	Guest
2020	Adivina qué hago esta noche	Cuatro	Assistant
2020	Mi casa es la tuya	Telecinco	Guest
2020–2021	Como sapiens	La 1	Collaborator
2021	Aquí la Tierra	La 1	Collaborator

=== Video clips ===
Year	Artist	Song
2009	Radio Macandé	La Lola
