= Norma Ruiz =

Spanish actress

- Ruiz in 2026
- Born: Norma Ruiz Izquierdo; 9 June 1982 (age 44); Madrid, Spain
- Occupation: Actress
- Years active: 2001-present

Norma Ruiz Izquierdo (Madrid, June 9, 1982) is a Spanish actress known for playing Bárbara Ortiz in Yo soy Bea.

== Biography ==
Norma is the youngest of four sisters. As a child she aspired to be a professional dancer. One of her sisters, a dance teacher, taught her to dance sevillanas when she was four years old and at the age of eight she entered a dance school. It was in the company of Miliki and Rita Irasema where she performed her first work, El flautista de Hamelin, which she performed for a year. She then entered the conservatory to learn Spanish dance. Antonio Canales and José Racero chose her for some shows, performing -for example- at the Palau Sant Jordi in Barcelona.

Ruiz in 2010

At the age of 19, an injury took her away from the world of dance, although she decided to continue dancing for a while in musicals to pay for her acting career. She then decided to enroll in the TAI University Arts Center in Madrid. In her last year she got the opportunity, thanks to the direction students of the same center, to participate in the cheapest movie of the Spanish cinema: La fiesta, which only cost 6000 euros in 2003. Later she participated in the independent The tester, by Fernando Núñez Herrera. In 2010, she released La herencia Valdemar and the comedy Tensión sexual no resuelta and in 2011 La herencia Valdemar II: La sombra prohibida.

She also participated in plays and musicals such as Sonrisas y lágrimas, Al compás son seis, Aires tradicionales, Esta noche hay que matar a Franco, Stabat mater, Por los pelos and El tiempo y los Conway.

In television, she has participated in the series Aquí no hay quién viva (Antena 3, 2005), La sopa boba (Antena 3, 2004) or Cuéntame cómo pasó (La 1, 2006). Although her best known television roles have been in El auténtico Rodrigo Leal (Antena 3, 2005), Yo soy Bea (Telecinco, 2006-2008), Gavilanes (Antena 3, 2010-2011), Parejología 3x2 (Telecinco, 2011), Supercharly (Telecinco, 2011).

Between 2012 and 2013 she worked in Telecinco's Frágiles. Also, she was part of the cast of two telefilms in 2011 about Carmen Cervera in which she gave life to Blanca Cuesta and Rocío Dúrcal, volver a verte where she played Rocío Dúrcal, after the role was rejected by the daughter of the artist Carmen Morales due to discrepancies with the script, both in Telecinco.

In 2014, she joined Cuatro's afternoon series, Ciega a citas, and in 2015 in the Antena 3 series Algo que celebrar.

In 2016 she starred in the series El hombre de tu vida alongside José Mota in La 1. In 2018 and 2019 she played Bárbara in La que se avecina.

=== Personal life ===
She is in a relationship with Bosco James. In January 2021, she announced her pregnancy on her Instagram account. Her daughter Alma was born on April 18, 2021.

== Dance and Art ==
- Sevillanas classes, taught by her sister.
- Dance classes in the company of Miliki and Rita Irasema.
- Real Conservatorio Profesional de Danza de Madrid, where she graduated in Dance.
- Escuela Superior de Artes y Espectáculos TAI, where she graduated in interpretation.
- School of Interpretation "La Guindalera".

== Career ==
=== Dancer ===
- Tour with Miliki and Rita Irasema. El flautista de Hamelin. (1988/1989)
- Shows of the Real Conservatorio Profesional de Danza de Madrid
- Several shows with Antonio Canales.
- Several shows with José Racero.
- Worked with the dancer Luisillo in several productions.
- Dancer in the Sonrisas y lágrimas (2000)
- Dancer in the flamenco musical Al compás son seis (2001)

=== Actress ===
==== Theater ====
- Una despedida de muerte
- Tr3s
- El tiempo y los Conway
- Lope de Aguirre, traidor
- La gaviota
- Aires tradicionales
- Esta noche hay que matar a Franco
- Stabat Mater
- Por los pelos (2008/2010)
- El poder de la sangre (2011/-)

==== Cinema ====
- La fiesta (2003), as Luna, protagonist.
- The Tester (2004), as Rebeca, protagonist.
- Tensión sexual no resuelta (2010), as Jazz, protagonist.
- La herencia Valdemar, (2010), as Ana, supporting actress.
- La herencia Valdemar II: La sombra prohibida, (2011), as Ana, supporting actress
- Los Futbolísimos, (2018), as Alicia, main character.

== Television ==
Year	Title	Character	Channel	Duration
2001	Mi teniente			1 episode
2004	Cuéntame cómo pasó	Silvia Bodeguero	TVE	5 episodes
2004	La sopa boba		Antena 3	1 episode
2005	El auténtico Rodrigo Leal	Mariaca	Antena 3	12 episodes
2005	Aquí no hay quien viva	Yolanda	Antena 3	1 episode
2006	Matrimonio con hijos	Susi	FOX	1 episode
2006	Tirando a dar		Telecinco	1 episodes
2006 - 2008	Yo soy Bea	Bárbara Ortiz	Telecinco	417 episodes
2010	Supercharly	Miriam Baquerizo	Cuatro	5 episodes
2010 - 2011	Gavilanes	Rosario Montes	Antena 3	11 episodes
2011	Parejología 3x2	María	Telecinco	3 episodes
2012	Cuñados (continuation of Parejologia 3x2)	María	Telecinco	9 episodes
2012 - 2013	Frágiles	Pilar	Telecinco	16 episodes
2014	Ciega a citas	Laura	Cuatro	11 episodes
2015	Algo que celebrar	Eva Navarro	Antena 3	8 episodes
2016	El hombre de tu vida	Silvia Domínguez "La Merkel"	TVE	8 episodes
2016	El Ministerio del Tiempo	Irene Alba	TVE	1 episode
2017; 2019	La que se avecina	Bárbara "La teacher"	Telecinco	8 episodes
2019 - 2020	El pueblo	Isabel “Isa”	Prime Video / Telecinco	14 episodes
2022 - presente	Señor, dame paciencia	Sandra Zaldívar Ramos	Antena 3	8 episodes

=== Telefilms ===
- Tita Cervera. La Baronesa (2011) as Blanca Cuesta, secondary.
- Rocío Dúrcal. Volver a verte (2011) as Rocío Dúrcal, protagonist.

=== Television ===
- El programa de Ana Rosa (2016) guest.

== Awards and nominations ==
2007 Actors' Union Awards

- Nomination for Best Newcomer Actress for Yo soy Bea.

2007 Kapital Awards

- Award for best performance for Por los pelos.
- Young Talent Award 2012 at the Comedy Film Festival of Tarazona and Moncayo.
