= Diana Gómez =

Spanish actress

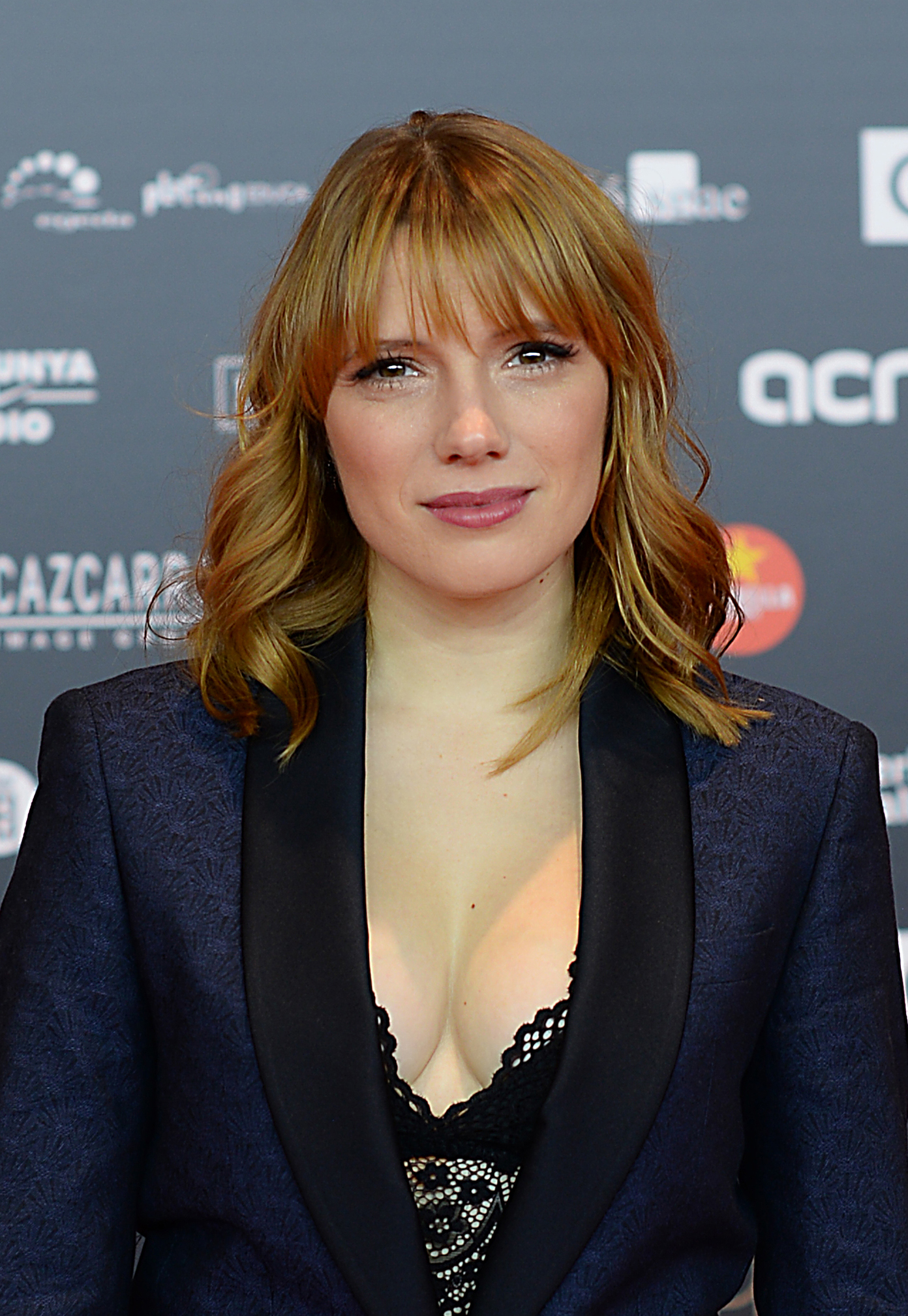
- At the 2020 Gaudí Awards
- Born: Diana Gómez Raich; 7 March 1989 (age 37); Igualada, Catalonia, Spain
- Occupation: Actress

Diana Gómez Raich (born 7 March 1989) is a Spanish actress. She became popular for her role as Tatiana in the flashbacks of the crime drama series Money Heist. She is also known for her leading role in Valeria.

== Biography ==
Born on 7 March 1989 in Igualada, Catalonia. Fond of dance, tap dance and jazz music and with a background in theatre, her film debut took place in 2006, as background actress in Manuel Huerga's Salvador, whereas her debut in television took place a year later, playing Júlia in the historical drama series La Via Augusta, broadcast on TV3. She then played minor roles in other TV shows. She also starred in more prominent roles in the telenovela El secreto de Puente Viejo, broadcast on Antena 3, and in Joel Joan's El crac, broadcast on TV3.

== Filmography ==
Television

Year	Title	Role	Notes	Ref
2007	La Via Augusta	Júlia		
2007	Atlas de geografía humana		TV movie	
2012–2013	El secreto de Puente Viejo	Pía Toledano	148 episodes	
2014–2017	El crac	Carla Casanova		
2015	Las aventuras del capitán Alatriste	Infanta Ana		
2017	Sé quién eres	Mónica	Supporting role	
2018	Vida privada	Maria Lluïsa	Miniseries	
2018	El día de mañana	Nita		
2019	45 revoluciones (45 rpm)	Clara Aguirre		
2019–2020	Money Heist	Tatiana		
2020–2025	Valeria	Valeria	Main role	
2022	¡García!	Young Feli / Julia	Secondary roles; limited series	

Film

Year	Title	Role	Notes	Ref
2008	Little Ashes	Ana María		
2009	Eloïse (Eloïse's Lover)	Asia		
2026	Cortafuego (Firebreak)	Elena		
