= Lolita Flores =

Spanish actress and singer

The Most Excellent Lolita Flores
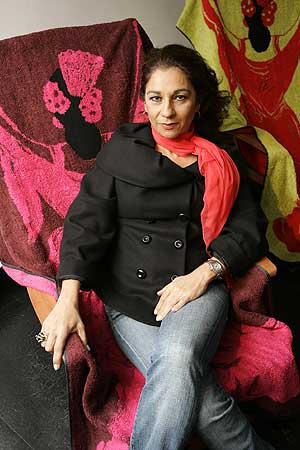
- Born: María Dolores González Flores; 6 May 1958 (age 68); Madrid, Spain
- Occupations: Singer, actress
- Spouse: Guillermo Furiase
- Children: 2, including Elena
- Parents: Antonio González (father); Lola Flores (mother)
- Relatives: Antonio Flores (brother); Rosario Flores (sister); Alba Flores (niece); Quique Sánchez Flores (cousin)

María Dolores González Flores (born 6 May 1958), better known as Lolita Flores, is a Spanish actress and singer.

== Biography ==
Lolita Flores is the daughter of Lola Flores and Antonio González, sister of Antonio Flores and Rosario Flores. She was married to Guillermo Furiase and they had two children Elena and Guillermo. She is of Gypsy descent on her father's side and identifies as Gypsy.

Flores started her career in the early 1970s and with the release of the album Amor, amor (and a single of the same name) in 1975 she achieved success in her native Spain as well as in countries in Latin-America. Her songs "Sarandonga", "Lo voy a dividir", and "Si la vida son dos días" among others, have become staples in Spanish radio.

In 2002, she won a Goya Award for Best New Actress for her performance in the movie Rencor. Flores has also appeared in several television programs such as Directísimo and Hostal Royal Manzanares. On 18 February 2019 she received the Medalla de Oro al Mérito en las Bellas Artes.

== Discography ==
- Amor, amor (1975)
- Abrázame (1976)
- Mi carta (1977)
- Espérame (1978)
- Seguir Soñando (1980)
- Atrévete (1982)
- Águila real (1983)
- Para volver (1985)
- Locura de amor (1987)
- Madrugada (1990)
- Con Sabor a Menta (1991)
- Y La Vida Pasa (1994)
- Quién lo va a detener (1995)
- Atrasar el reloj (1997)
- Lola, Lolita, Lola (2001)
- Lola, Lolita, Dolores (2002)
- Si la vida son 2 días (2004)
- Y ahora Lola. Un regalo a mi madre (2005)
- Sigue caminando (2007)

== Filmography ==
- Paella Today! (2017)
- La princesa del polígono (2007)
- Fuerte Apache (2006)
- Rencor (2002)

== Honors ==
- 2026 – Grand Cross of the Civil Order of Alfonso X, the Wise (Kingdom of Spain, 18 de febrero 2026).
