= Víctor Palmero =

Spanish actor (born 1989)

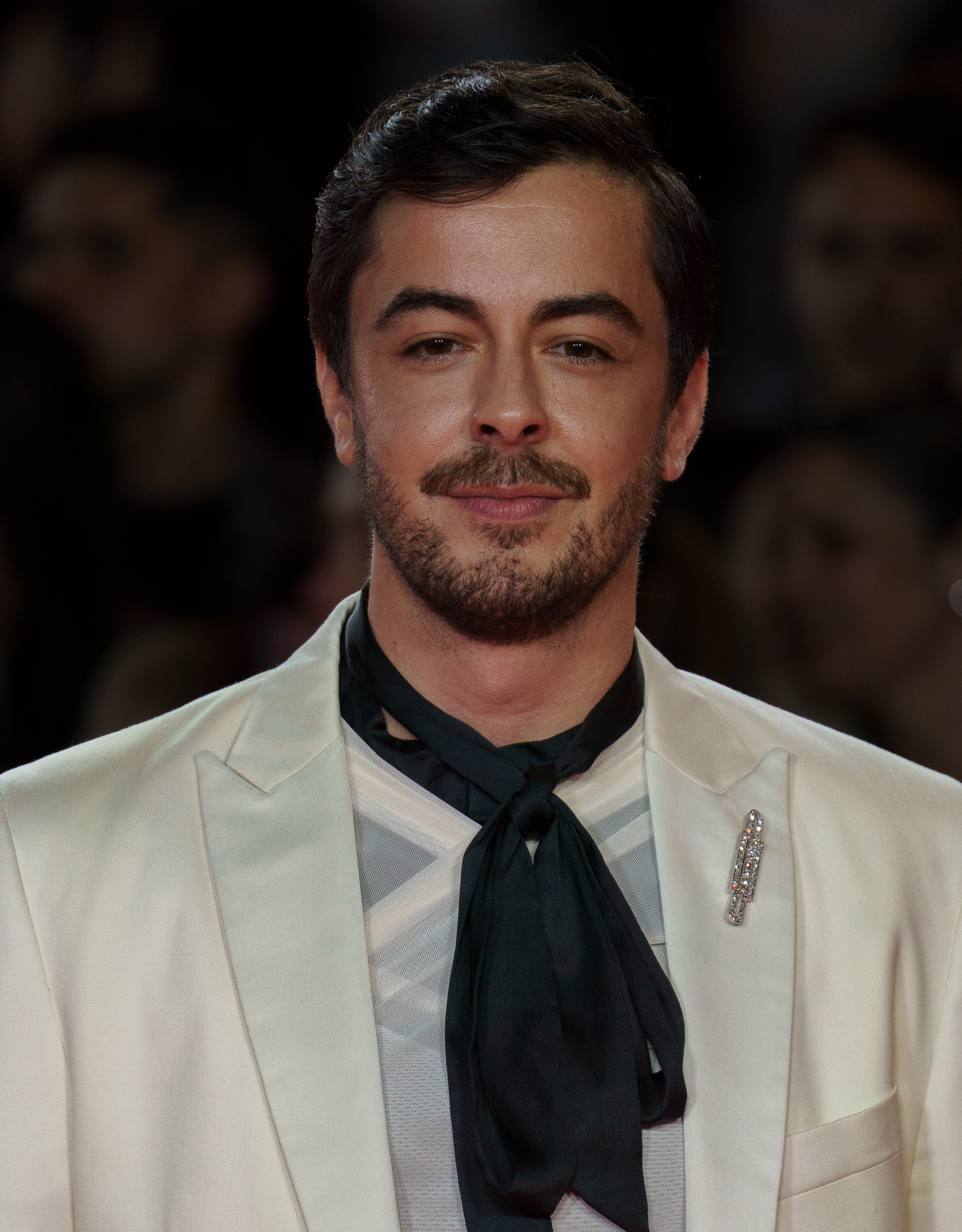
- Palmero in 2025
- Born: Víctor Manuel Palmero Guerol; 26 December 1989 (age 35); Onda, Valencian Community, Spain
- Occupation: Actor
- Years active: 2004-present

Víctor Manuel Palmero Guerol (26 December 1989) is a Spanish actor.

He was born in Onda, Castellón in 1989 and he made his debut in Física o química. When he ended his role in Con el culo al aire, he worked as a waiter.

He appeared in stage plays such as Atrapados, Climax and Háblame, starring María Garralón and Mariola Fuentes, and in the TV series La que se avecina. He also appeared in the show Pasapalabra.

In 2017 he won Best Actor for his role of Alba Recio in La que se avecina in a TV online competition.

== Filmography ==
- El ángel (TBA)
- La que se avecina (2015-2019) as Alba Recio
- Les 7 Llums (2019) as Marc
- Historias románticas (un poco) cabronas (2018) as Abel
- Desalia, la película (2017) as Víctor
- Olmos y Robles (2016) as Roberto García
- Yo quisiera (2015-2016) as Lope
- Bajo sospecha (2015) as Chico porros
- Con el culo al aire (2012-2014) as Dani
- Dioses y perros (2014) as Jaro
- Claudia a través del cristal (2012)
- Future Plans (2011) as David
- Senyor Retor (2011) as Nelo
- Física o química (2011) as Toño
- Conchín se lo traga (2010) as Miguel
- Unió musical da Capo (2009-2010) as Raúl
- Love to Keep (2006)
- Sprint especial (2005)
