= List of German films of 2025 =

This is a list of German films that are scheduled to release in 2025.

Opening	English Title	Native Title	Director	Cast	Studio	Ref.
January 23	The Three ??? and the Carpathian Dog	Die drei ??? und der Karpatenhund	Tim Dünschede	Julius Weckauf, Nevio Wendt, Levi Brandl	Deutsche Columbia Pictures Filmproduktion, Wiedemann & Berg Film	
February 13	Wunderschöner		Karoline Herfurth	Karoline Herfurth, Anneke Kim Sarnau, Emilia Schüle, Nora Tschirner	Hellinger / Doll Filmproduktion, Warner Bros. Film Productions Germany	
February 15	Hysteria		Mehmet Akif Büyükatalay	Devrim Lingnau, Serkan Kaya, Nicolette Krebitz	Filmfaust Filmproduktion	
March 7	Delicious		Nele Mueller-Stöfen	Valerie Pachner, Fahri Yardım, Carla Díaz	Komplizen Film	
March 13	Köln 75		Ido Fluk	Mala Emde	One Two Films	
March 20	The Light	Das Licht	Tom Tykwer	Lars Eidinger, Nicolette Krebitz	Zweites Deutsches Fernsehen (ZDF)	
April 3	Punching the World	Mit der Faust in die Welt schlagen	Constanze Klaue	Anton Franke, Camille Moltzen	Flare Film	
April 17	What Marielle Knows	Was Marielle weiß	Frédéric Hambalek	Julia Jentsch	Walker + Worm Film	
April 30	Exterritorial	Exterritorial	Christian Zübert	Jeanne Goursaud, Lera Abova, Dougray Scott	Constantin Film, Netflix	
May 8	No Beast. So Fierce.	Kein Tier. So Wild.	Burhan Qurbani	Kenda Hmeidan	Sommerhaus Filmproduktion	
June 19	Cicadas	Zikaden	Ina Weisse	Nina Hoss	Lupa Film GmbH	
August 14	Manitou's Canoe	Das Kanu des Manitu	Michael Herbig	Michael Herbig, Christian Tramitz, Rick Kavanian, Jasmin Schwiers, Jessica Schwarz, Friedrich Mücke	herbX film	
August 28	Sound of Falling	In die Sonne schauen	Mascha Schilinski	Hanna Heckt, Lena Urzendowsky, Laeni Geiseler, Susanne Wuest, Luise Heyer, Lea Drinda	Studio Zentral, ZDF	
September 4	22 Bahnen		Mia Maariel Meyer	Luna Wedler, Laura Tonke, Jannis Niewöhner, Zoe Fürmann, Ercan Karacayli, Luis Pintsch	BerghausWöbke Filmproduktion	
September 25	The Moelln Letters	Die Möllner Briefe	Martina Priessner	Havva Arslan	inselfilm produktion	
October 16	Circusboy	Zirkuskind	Julia Lemke and Anna Koch	Santino Frank	Flare Film production	
November 20	All That's Left of You	Im Schatten des Orangenbaums	Cherien Dabis	Cherien Dabis, Saleh Bakri, Adam Bakri, Mohammad Bakri, Maria Zreik, Muhammad Abed Elrahman	Pallas Film, Twenty Twenty Vision, AMP Filmworks	

== See also ==
- 2025 in Germany
- 2025 in film
- List of German films of 2024
