= Casa chica =

2025 Mexican short film

- Festival release poster
- Directed by: Lau Charles
- Screenplay by: Lau Charles
- Produced by: Luna Martínez Montero
- Starring: Mauro Guzman; Katherine Bernal; Daniela Arroio; Raúl Briones
- Cinematography: Ángel Jara Taboada
- Edited by: Santiago Zermeño
- Music by: Marco Charles; Alonso Alemán
- Production companies: Centro de Capacitación Cinematográfica, A.C
- Release date: 15 February 2025 (Berlinale)
- Running time: 24 minutes
- Country: Mexico
- Language: Spanish

Casa chica is a 2025 Mexican short drama film written and directed by Lau Charles. The short film tells the story of five-year-old Valentina, and her 11-year-old brother Quique, when they meet their father's other family. Their lives change forever when they discover that their half-sister is the same age as Valentina.

It was selected in the Berlinale Shorts section at the 75th Berlin International Film Festival, where it had its World premiere on 15 February and competed for Golden Bear for Best Short Film.

== Synopsis ==
The term 'casa chica' describes a common practice in Mexican society, where some married men lead a double life, building a parallel family with a woman and children, in addition to their primary family as opposed to 'casa grande' (big house). This is my story. – Lau Charles.

The short film follows siblings 11-years-old Quique and five-years-old Valentina as they adjust to life with their mother after their parents' separation. During a visit with their father, they meet his new family, including a half-sister Valentina’s age. Through a cinematic diptych, the film explores their emotions and perspectives, intertwining the director's fragmented memories to reveal a poignant portrait of her real family 25 years later.

== Cast ==
- Mauro Guzmán as Quique
- Katherine Bernal as Valentina
- Daniela Arroio as Carolina
- Raúl Briones as Enrique
- Raquel Robles as Claudia
- Kala Martínez as Valeria
- Marco Charles as Marco Charles
- Lau Charles as Lau Charles

== Production ==
The film was shot beginning on 1 October 2024 and ending on 9 October 2024.

== Release ==
Casa chica had its world premiere on 15 February 2025, as part of the 75th Berlin International Film Festival, in the Berlinale Shorts 4.

== Accolades ==
Award	Date	Category	Recipient	Result	Ref.
Berlin International Film Festival	23 February 2025	Golden Bear for Best Short Film	Casa chica	Nominated	
Berlin International Film Festival	23 February 2025	Berlinale Shorts CUPRA Filmmaker Award	Casa chica	Nominated	
