= Ordinary Life (film) =

2025 Japanese short film

- Festival release poster
- Japanese: 普通の生活
- Directed by: Yoriko Mizushiri
- Written by: Yoriko Mizushiri
- Produced by: Pierre Baussaron; Nobuaki Doi
- Starring: Sumi Mizushiri
- Cinematography: Yoriko Mizushiri
- Edited by: Yoriko Mizushiri
- Music by: Kengo Tokusashi
- Animation by: Yoriko Mizushiri
- Color process: Color
- Production companies: Miyu Productions; New Deer
- Distributed by: Miyu Productions
- Release date: 15 February 2025 (Berlinale)
- Running time: 10 minutes
- Countries: Japan; France
- Language: Japanese

Ordinary Life (Japanese: 普通の生活 (Futsu no seikatsu)) is a 2025 short, 2D digital animated film written and directed by Yoriko Mizushiri. The French-Japanese co-production film depicts the succession of moments that we repeat over and over again in ordinary life but they are never the same, and everything changes and wavers.

It was selected in the Berlinale Shorts section at the 75th Berlin International Film Festival, where it had its World premiere on 15 February and compete for Golden Bear for Best Short Film.

== Synopsis ==
Life may seem repetitive, but each moment is unique and ever-changing. While the mind wanders, the body remains anchored in the present, constantly drawing us back to truly experience it. Fully feeling sensations through the body may be life's greatest joy.

== Release ==
Ordinary Life had its World premiere on 15 February 2025, as part of the 75th Berlin International Film Festival, in the Berlinale Shorts 3.

The film was also part of Shorts Programmes, Animation at the 2025 Atlantic International Film Festival and screened on September 15, 2025.

The film also made it to Shorts Program 2: Animation at the 61st Chicago International Film Festival and was screened on October 24, 2025, where it won the Silver Hugo for Animation Short Film.

== Accolades ==
From this year, the Berlinale Shorts CUPRA Filmmaker Award will be presented to a distinctive directorial talent within the festival's short film competition. This new accolade is sponsored by CUPRA and comes with a grant of €20,000.

Award	Date	Category	Recipient	Result	Ref.
Berlin International Film Festival	23 February 2025	Golden Bear for Best Short Film	Ordinary Life	Nominated	
Berlin International Film Festival	23 February 2025	Berlinale Shorts CUPRA Filmmaker Award	Ordinary Life	Nominated	
Berlin International Film Festival	23 February 2025	Silver Bear for Best Short Film	Ordinary Life	Won	
Chicago International Film Festival	25 October 2025	Silver Hugo Award for Animated Short Film	Ordinary Life	Won	
Mainichi Film Awards	10 February 2026	Ōfuji Noburō Award	Ordinary Life	Won	
