= Mother's Child (film) =

2024 Dutch animated film

- Festival release poster
- Directed by: Naomi Noir
- Written by: Naomi Noir; Maya Devincenzi Dil
- Produced by: Naomi Noir
- Starring: Maya Devincenzi Dil; Grace Kimasi; Phaedra Fidessa
- Edited by: Maryam De Vries
- Music by: Kris McDonald
- Animation by: Naomi Noir; Lara Adriolo; Max Gierkink
- Color process: Color
- Release dates: 21 September 2024 (NFF); 15 February 2025 (Berlinale)
- Running time: 9 minutes
- Country: Netherlands
- Language: English

Mother's Child is a 2024 Dutch short animated film co-written and directed by Naomi Noir. The film follows a loving mother and full-time carer Mary, for whom every day is a battle as the caregiver and simultaneously to understand her disabled, non-verbal son Murphy’s needs.

The film had its world premiere at the Netherlands Film Festival on September 21, 2024. It was also selected in the Berlinale Shorts section at the 75th Berlin International Film Festival, where it had its International premiere on 15 February and compete for Golden Bear for Best Short Film.

== Synopsis ==
This surreal animation honors caregivers, giving voice to their selfless dedication. Mary, a devoted caregiver, struggles with bureaucracy, isolation, and exhaustion while caring for her non-verbal, disabled son, Murphy. An unhelpful administrator deepens her frustration, making it harder to find beauty in daily life.

== Voices ==
- Maya Devincenzi Dil (Mary)
- Grace Kimasi (Murphy)
- Phaedra Fidessa (Nancy)
- James Alexander Hyslop (Jeffrey JR)
- Eoghan Ruddy (Bartender Fred)
- Kris McDonald (Sleep-Is-4-The-Meek-Mark)

== Release ==
The film had its world premiere at the 43rd Netherlands Film Festival on September 21, 2024. On 25 September, it was screened at the Blikvangers Film Festival in block 1.

Mother's Child had its International premiere on 15 February 2025, as part of the 75th Berlin International Film Festival, in the Berlinale Shorts 4.

The film was also be screened at the Kaboom Animation Festival from 21 to 23 March in Utrecht and from 27 to 30 March in Amsterdam.

== Accolades ==
From this year, the Berlinale Shorts CUPRA Filmmaker Award will be presented to a distinctive directorial talent within the festival's short film competition. This new accolade is sponsored by CUPRA and comes with a grant of €20,000.

Award	Date	Category	Recipient	Result	Ref.
Berlin International Film Festival	23 February 2025	Golden Bear for Best Short Film	Mother's Child	Nominated	
Berlin International Film Festival	23 February 2025	Berlinale Shorts CUPRA Filmmaker Award	Mother's Child	Nominated	
