= Timoteus Anggawan Kusno =

Visual artist from Indonesia

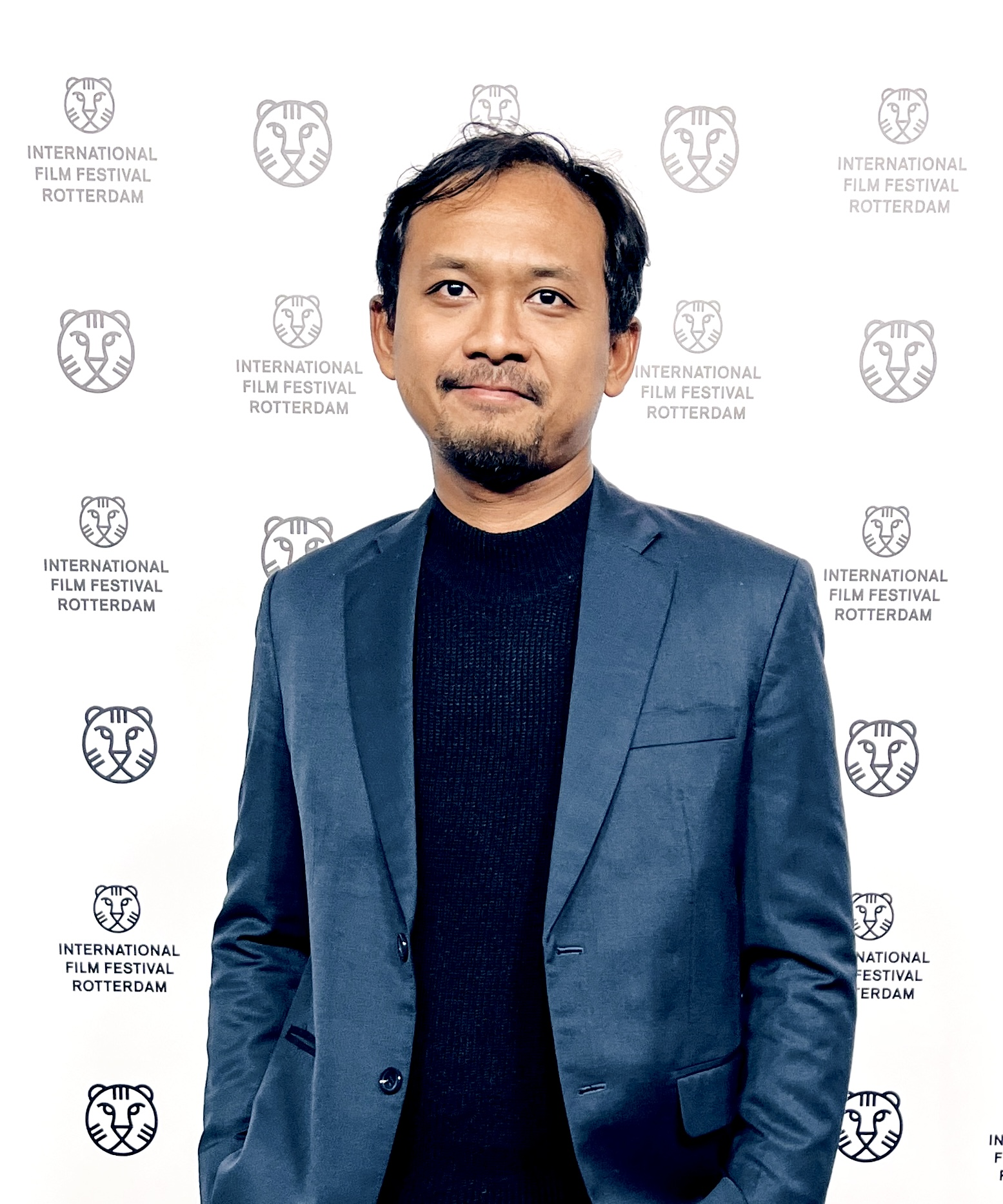
- Born: Timoteus Anggawan Kusno; 1989 (age 36–37); Yogyakarta
- Education: University of Amsterdam; Sanata Dharma University; Gadjah Mada University
- Known for: installation art, video art, film
- Notable work: Luka dan Bisa Kubawa Berlari (Rijksmuseum, 2022); Centre for Tanah Runcuk Studies
- Awards: Han Nefkens Foundation – Loop Barcelona Video Production Award (2022), VISIO - European Programme on Artists' Moving Image (2024)

Timoteus Anggawan Kusno is an Indonesian visual artist, researcher, and filmmaker. Kusno's works explore the lasting effects of colonialism and power through installations, drawings, and moving images. His meta-fictional approach reflects on the role of medium in narrative creation and examines the mechanisms of "history-making." Kusno's works have been featured in international cultural institutions and biennales, including at the Rijksmuseum in Amsterdam, where Kusno worked with the museum's collection. Kusno's artwork powerfully exposes the neglected and violent legacy of colonial history and its ongoing impact on the present day. He was also awarded the 2021 Video Production Award from the Han Nefkens Foundation – Loop Barcelona. He is the founder of the Centre for Tanah Runcuk Studies, an experimental art project.

== Career ==
Kusno started his art career in 2007 and participated in Biennale Jogja IX 2007: Neo-Nation. In November 2014, he organized a solo exhibition at Kedai Kebun Forum titled "Memoir of Tanah Runcuk: A Note from the 'Lost' Land," in which he explored the idea of truth in history and how it can be manipulated to present a singular accepted truth. Kusno's fictional land of Tanah Runcuk, situated on the boundaries of three tectonic plates, shared a history with Dutch colonization in Indonesia. As a metaphor, Tanah Runcuk blurs the lines between fiction and reality, and aims to expose the injustices committed by the colonizers, making it a "fictional historical" piece.

Kusno's art career has been marked by a number of significant achievements and collaborations. In 2017, he collaborated with Tony Albert in the Kerjasama Art Residency, which took place in Alice Springs, Australia, and Yogyakarta, Indonesia. That same year, Kusno exhibited his work at the Centre for Fine Arts in Brussels as part of the Europalia Arts Festival Indonesia, in the project curated by Charles Esche and Riksa Afiaty entitled "Power and other things: Indonesia & Art (1835-now)". In 2018, his installation titled "The Death of a Tiger and Other Empty Seats" was exhibited and collected by the National Museum of Modern and Contemporary Art (MMCA) in Seoul, South Korea. Kusno was also commissioned to participate in the 13th Gwangju Biennale in South Korea in 2020 with his work "Shades of the Unseen." In 2019, Kusno was a guest resident artist at the Rijksakademie in Amsterdam. He also presented his artwork at the Mindful Circulation exhibition held at the Dr. Bhau Daji Lad Mumbai City Museum in India, in 2019.

In 2022, Kusno collaborated with the Rijksmuseum to create an artwork featuring colonial-era objects from the museum's collection. The aim was to evoke resistance preceding the Indonesian revolution and highlight the enduring impact of colonialism while also questioning the coloniality of power in contemporary society. In his artwork "Luka dan Bisa Kubawa Berlari" presented at Revolusi!, Kusno argues that the Indonesian revolution did not emerge suddenly, but rather resulted from centuries of oppression and resistance against colonial power. He contends that coloniality, as a system of thought and practice, is not confined to the past, but persists in contemporary reality. This is evidenced by ongoing institutional injustice, racism and discrimination rooted in the colonial era.

In 2024, he directed a short film After Colossus, a Italy, Indonesia, and Netherlands co-production. It was selected in the Berlinale Shorts section at the 75th Berlin International Film Festival, where it will have its World premiere in February and compete for Golden Bear for Best Short Film. In 2025, the International Film Festival Rotterdam is highlighting Focus: Timoteus Anggawan Kusno showcasing eight of his films, including two world premieres and one world (festival) premiere, alongside an exhibition featuring his charcoal paintings. His artist film project, Phantoms Trilogy, is also slated to have its UK premiere at Tate Modern, London, in the same year.
