= Close to September =

2025 Spanish short film

- Festival release poster
- Spanish: Casi septiembre
- Directed by: Lucía G. Romero
- Screenplay by: Lucía G. Romero
- Produced by: Carolina Caballero; Irina Canyet
- Starring: Ana Barja; Isabel Rico; Salim Daprincee; Mar Casas Font; Ninoska Linares Aranda
- Cinematography: Gemma de Miguel
- Edited by: Marina Ayet
- Music by: Oriol Brunet
- Production companies: ESCAC Films; Escac Studio; Scandal Films; Filmax
- Release date: 15 February 2025 (Berlinale)
- Running time: 30 minutes
- Country: Spain
- Language: Spanish

Close to September (Spanish: Casi septiembre) is a 2025 Spanish short drama film written and directed by Lucía G. Romero. It tells the story of Alejandra, who lives on a campsite close to the big hotels. She takes care of her siblings, hangs out in the neighbourhood and flirts casually with the tourists – until she meets Amara.

It was selected in the Berlinale Shorts section at the 75th Berlin International Film Festival, where it had its World premiere on 15 February and compete for Golden Bear for Best Short Film. It is also selected for 39th Teddy Award, and will compete for Best Short Film.

== Synopsis ==
The film follows Alejandra, a young woman living a monotonous life at her family's coastal camping resort. Her summers are marked by fleeting romances with tourists, but everything changes when she meets Amara, a confident and mysterious city girl. Their connection forces Alejandra to confront past traumas, question her boundaries, and embark on a journey of self-discovery and growth, redefining her views on love and identity.

== Cast ==
- Ana Barja as Alejandra
- Isabel Rico as Amara
- Salim Daprincee as Omar
- Mar Casas Font as Alejandra's mother
- Ninoska Linares Aranda as Sofía
- Andrea Pérez Jiménez as Carmen
- Naima Doblas as Isabel

== Release ==
Close to September had its World premiere on 15 February 2025, as part of the 75th Berlin International Film Festival, in the Berlinale Shorts 5.

== Accolades ==
Award	Date	Category	Recipient	Result	Ref.
Berlin International Film Festival	23 February 2025	Golden Bear for Best Short Film	Close to September	Nominated	
Berlin International Film Festival	23 February 2025	Berlinale Shorts CUPRA Filmmaker Award	Close to September	Nominated	
Berlin International Film Festival	23 February 2025	Teddy Award for Best Short Films	Close to September	Nominated	
