= Stone of Destiny (2025 film) =

2025 animated film

- Theatrical release poster
- Czech: Kámen Osudu
- Directed by: Julie Černá
- Written by: Julie Černá
- Screenplay by: Kateřina Boušková
- Produced by: Kristina Husová
- Edited by: Alexandra Volfová
- Music by: Johana Novotná (Johuš Matuš)
- Animation by: Julie Černá; Matouš Valchář
- Color process: Color
- Production companies: Pure Shore Films; UMPRUM
- Distributed by: Square Eyes; New Europe Film Sales
- Release date: 17 February 2025 (Berlinale)
- Running time: 11 minutes
- Country: Czech Republic
- Language: Czech

Stone of Destiny (Czech: Kámen Osudu) is a 2025 animated short film written and directed by Julie Černá. The film is based on Julie Černá's trilogy of comic books, Stone of Destiny, which was awarded the Muriel Prize for the best student comic book in 2022. In this animated musical, the Stone of Destiny longs for freedom and wants to overcome its self-doubt. So it embarks on a journey and meets strange creatures in strange places.

It was selected in the Berlinale Shorts section at the 75th Berlin International Film Festival, where it had its World premiere on 15 February and competed for Golden Bear for Best Short Film.

== Summary ==
The animated musical follows the anthropomorphized Stone of Destiny on a quest for freedom, encountering mysterious symbols and self-doubt. Inspired by Julie Černá's experiences and her comic book, the story explores themes of understanding, beauty, and loneliness. The Stone's journey reflects Černá's own struggles with emotional insight, past relationships, and solitude.

== Release ==
Stone of Destiny had its World premiere on 15 February 2025, as part of the 75th Berlin International Film Festival, in the Berlinale Shorts 2.

== Accolades ==
Award	Date	Category	Recipient	Result	Ref.
Berlin International Film Festival	23 February 2025	Golden Bear for Best Short Film	Stone of Destiny	Nominated	
Berlin International Film Festival	23 February 2025	Berlinale Shorts CUPRA Filmmaker Award	Stone of Destiny	Nominated	
