= Anba dlo =

2025 Cuban short film

- Festival release poster
- Haitian Creole: Anba dlo
- Literally: Underwater
- Directed by: Luiza Calagian; Rosa Caldeira
- Screenplay by: Luiza Calagian; Rosa Caldeira
- Produced by: Matheus Moura; Well Amorim
- Starring: Berline Charles; Feguenson Hermogène; Doreen Granados; Alejandra de Jesús Garcell
- Cinematography: Well Amorim
- Edited by: Luiza Garcia
- Production companies: Maloka Films; Ursana Films; Mata Fechada Films; Kinolakay; EICTV Cuba
- Distributed by: Maloka Filmes; Mata Fechada Filmes; Ursana Filmes
- Release date: 15 February 2025 (Berlinale)
- Running time: 18 minutes
- Countries: Cuba; Brazil; Haiti
- Languages: Haitian Creole; Spanish

Anba dlo is a 2025 short drama film written and directed by Luiza Calagian and Rosa Caldeira. It tells the story of Nadia, who is a biologist researching the native flora and fauna of Cuba. One day the forest sounds different. Something has happened. Her Haitian homeland has never felt further away.

The Cuban-Brazilian-Haitian co-production was selected in the Berlinale Shorts section at the 75th Berlin International Film Festival, where it had its World premiere on 15 February and competed for Golden Bear for Best Short Film.

== Synopsis ==
Nadia, a Haitian biologist, moves to Cuba to further her studies, leaving behind her homeland and culture. She adapts to the Cuban lifestyle, learning Spanish and practicing Santería. Years later, her routine is disrupted by the reappearance of Yvon, her former love from Haiti, compelling her to confront her past and resurfacing emotions, making Haiti feel even more distant.

== Cast ==
- Berline Charles
- Feguenson Hermogène
- Doreen Granados
- Alejandra de Jesús Garcell

== Release ==
Anba dlo had its World premiere on 15 February 2025, as part of the 75th Berlin International Film Festival, in the Berlinale Shorts 2.

== Accolades ==
Award	Date	Category	Recipient	Result	Ref.
Berlin International Film Festival	23 February 2025	Golden Bear for Best Short Film	Anba dlo	Nominated	
Berlin International Film Festival	23 February 2025	Berlinale Shorts CUPRA Filmmaker Award	Anba dlo	Nominated	
