= Ceasefire (2025 film) =

2025 Slovenian short film

- Festival release poster
- Bosnian: Prekid vatre
- Directed by: Jakob Krese
- Screenplay by: Jakob Krese
- Produced by: Annika Mayer; Jakob Krese; Ivana Naceva
- Starring: Hazira
- Cinematography: Jakob Krese
- Edited by: Annika Mayer
- Music by: Gaston Ibarroule
- Production companies: Majmun Films; Zero Stress Production; Pótem
- Release date: 15 February 2025 (Berlinale)
- Running time: 30 minutes
- Countries: Germany; Italy; Slovenia
- Language: Bosnian

Ceasefire (Bosnian: Prekid vatre) is a 2025 Bosnian-language short documentary drama film written and directed by Jakob Krese. It tells the story of Hazira, who survived Srebrenica.

It was selected in the Berlinale Shorts section at the 75th Berlin International Film Festival, where it had its World premiere on 15 February and compete for Golden Bear for Best Short Film.

== Synopsis ==
Hazira, a Srebrenica survivor, has lived in the Jezevac refugee camp near Tuzla for nearly 30 years, unable to return to her village, now part of Republika Srpska. Political and social instability have left her in limbo, her days consumed by survival routines. Using dark humor and resilience, she navigates the trauma of war, constantly moving to escape painful memories and the fear of history repeating itself. Her situation mirrors Bosnia and Herzegovina’s ongoing stagnation. As 2025 marks 30 years since the Srebrenica genocide, this film pays tribute to those still suffering its aftermath.

== Cast ==
- Hazira

== Release ==
Ceasefire had its World premiere on 15 February 2025, as part of the 75th Berlin International Film Festival, in the Berlinale Shorts 4.

== Accolades ==
Award	Date	Category	Recipient	Result	Ref.
Berlin International Film Festival	23 February 2025	Golden Bear for Best Short Film	Ceasefire	Nominated	
Berlin International Film Festival	23 February 2025	Berlinale Shorts CUPRA Filmmaker Award	Ceasefire	Nominated	
