= If You Are Afraid You Put Your Heart into Your Mouth and Smile =

- Promotional release poster
- Directed by: Marie Luise Lehner
- Written by: Marie Luise Lehner
- Produced by: Nikolaus Geyrhalter; Markus Glaser; Michael Kitzberger; Katharina Posch; Wolfgang Widerhofer
- Starring: Siena Popović; Mariya Menner
- Cinematography: Simone Hart
- Edited by: Jana Libnik; Alexandra Schneider; Joana Scrinzi
- Production company: Nikolaus Geyrhalter Filmproduktion
- Release dates: February 19, 2025 (Berlinale); September 26, 2025 (Austria)
- Running time: 87 minutes
- Country: Austria
- Languages: German; German Sign Language; English

If You Are Afraid You Put Your Heart into Your Mouth and Smile (German: Wenn du Angst hast nimmst du dein Herz in den Mund und lächelst) is a 2025 Austrian coming-of-age drama film written and directed by Marie Luise Lehner in her directorial debut. It stars Siena Popović and Mariya Menner.

The film had its world premiere at the 75th Berlin International Film Festival on 19 February 2025. It was honored with the Jury Award and CICAE Art Cinema Award in the Forum section.

== Synopsis ==
Anna is a 12-year-old girl who has a very good relationship with her deaf mother despite their financial difficulties. However, the new high school environment, where the students are from an upper-class background, overwhelms Anna, who becomes ashamed of her origins and her mother. However, she finds an ally in her friend Mara, who also hides a secret.

== Cast ==
- Siena Popović as Anna
- Mariya Menner as Isolde
- Jessica Paar as Mara
- Alessandro Scheibner as Paul
- Alperen Köse as Biker
- Kathrin Resetarits as Teacher Iris Lust
- Daniel Sea as Mara's father

== Production ==
Principal photography began on March 12, 2024, and wrapped on April 26, 2024, in Vienna, Austria.

== Release ==
The film had its world premiere on February 19, 2025, in the Forum section of the 75th Berlin International Film Festival, then screened on March 29, 2025, at the 28th Diagonale, and on April 29, 2025, at the 22nd Crossing Europe Film Festival.

It was commercially released on September 26, 2025 in Austrian theaters.

== Accolades ==
Year	Award / Festival	Category	Recipient	Result	Ref.
2025	75th Berlin International Film Festival	Teddy Award - Jury Award	If You Are Afraid You Put Your Heart into Your Mouth and Smile	Won	
2025	75th Berlin International Film Festival	CICAE Art Cinema Award - Forum section	If You Are Afraid You Put Your Heart into Your Mouth and Smile	Won	
2025	28th Diagonale	Thomas Pluch Screenplay Prize	Marie Luise Lehner	Won	
2025	28th Diagonale	Special Jury Prize	If You Are Afraid You Put Your Heart into Your Mouth and Smile	Won	
2025	22nd Crossing Europe Film Festival	Award Local Artist - Young Talent	If You Are Afraid You Put Your Heart into Your Mouth and Smile	Won	
