= Living the Land =

2025 Chinese drama film

- Festival release poster
- Traditional Chinese: 生息之地
- Literal meaning: A place of life
- Hanyu Pinyin: Sheng xi zhi di
- Directed by: Huo Meng
- Written by: Huo Meng
- Produced by: Zhang Fan; Xu Chunping; Yao Chen; Jiang Hao; Cai Yuan
- Starring: Wang Shang; Zhang Chuwen; Zhang Yanrong; Zhang Caixia; Cao Lingzhi
- Cinematography: Guo Daming
- Edited by: Huo Meng
- Music by: Wan Jianguo
- Production companies: Floating Light; Film and Culture Co., Ltd.; Film Group; Phoenix Legend Films Co., Ltd.; Bad RabbitPictures Co., Ltd.; Lianray Pictures
- Distributed by: m-appeal
- Release date: 14 February 2025 (Berlinale)
- Running time: 132 minutes
- Country: China
- Language: Mandarin
- Box office: $1 million

Living the Land (Chinese: 生息之地) is a 2025 Chinese drama film directed by Huo Meng. The film set in the 1990s, is about a 10-year-old boy who is confronted with both rural traditions and socio-economic change in his Chinese home village.

The film had its world premiere at the main competition of the 75th Berlin International Film Festival, on 14 February 2025, where it won the Silver Bear for Best Director.

The film was expected to be released in China in 2025. By 2026, it was still unreleased in the country.

== Synopsis ==
In 1991, Bawangtai village, China was lively with activity, holding cherished memories of its vibrant past. Xu Chuang, who stayed with his grandmother, witnessed the cycle of spring planting and autumn harvest, as well as various village events like weddings and funerals. However, as the trend of becoming migrant workers grew, the younger generation slowly departed for city life, subtly transforming the rural landscape.

== Cast ==
- Wang Shang as Chuang
- Zhang Chuwen as Great Grannie
- Zhang Yanrong as Xiuying
- Zhang Caixia
- Cao Lingzhi

== Release ==
Living the Land had its world premiere on 14 February 2025, as part of the 75th Berlin International Film Festival, in Competition. On 10 October 2025, it will be showcased in Showcase section of 2025 Vancouver International Film Festival. Later it competed in the 'Official Section' of the 70th Valladolid International Film Festival for Golden Spike. It will be presented in 'Rising Stars - 2025' section of the 56th International Film Festival of India in November 2025.

In January 2025, the Berlin-based M-Appeal acquired the marketing rights of the film.

== Reception ==
On the review aggregator website Rotten Tomatoes, 100% of 27 critics' reviews are positive, with an average rating of 7.8/10.

== Accolades ==
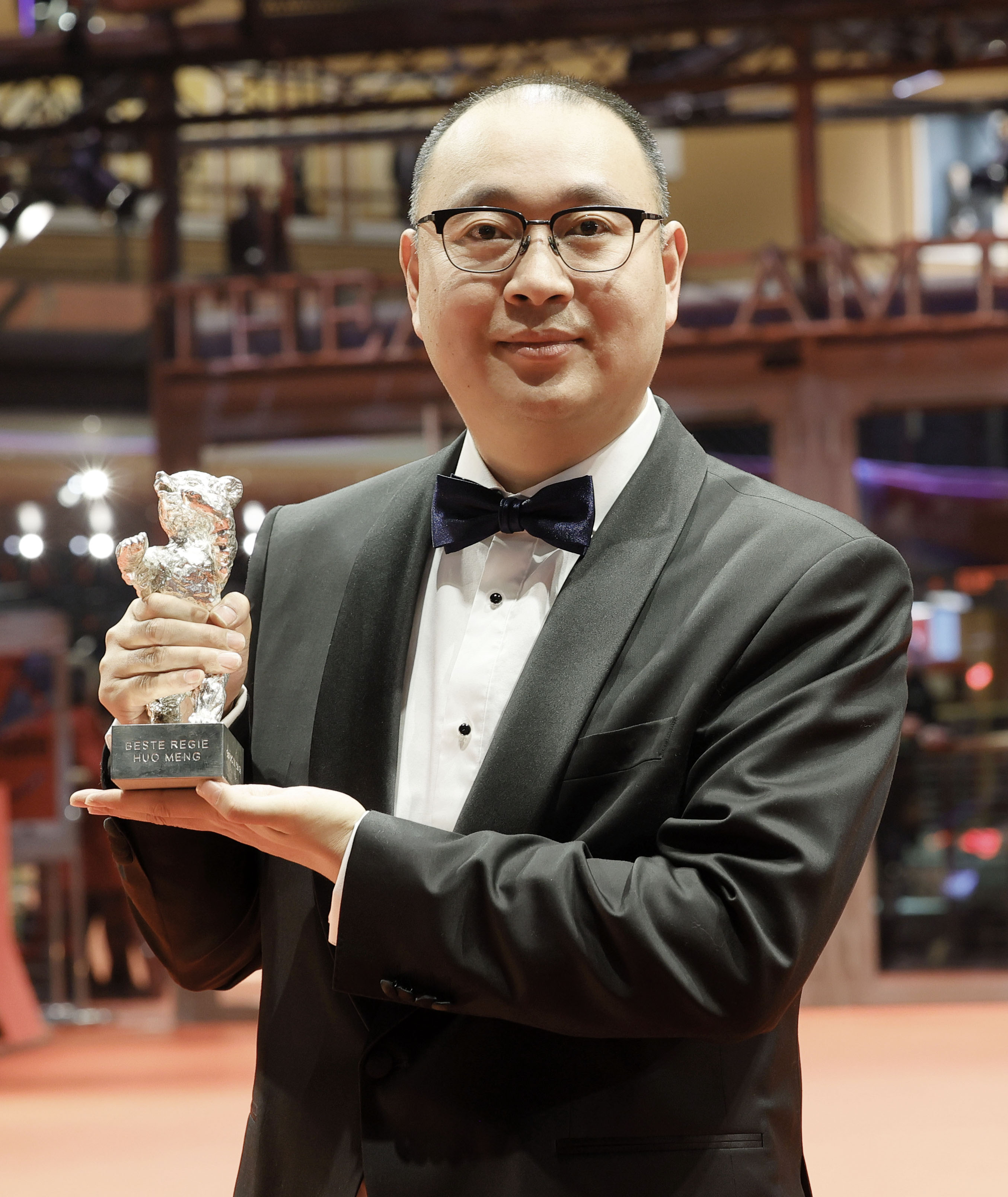
Huo Meng, director of Living the Land winner of Silver Bear for Best Director at Berlinale 2025

Award	Date of ceremony	Category	Recipient	Result	Ref.
Berlin International Film Festival	23 February 2025	Golden Bear	Living the Land	Nominated	
Berlin International Film Festival	23 February 2025	Silver Bear for Best Director	Huo Meng	Won	
Valladolid International Film Festival	1 November 2025	Golden Spike	Living the Land	Nominated	
