= Lloyd Wong, Unfinished =

2025 Canadian short documentary film

- Festival release poster
- Directed by: Lesley Loksi Chan; Original Footage: Lloyd Wong
- Produced by: Lesley Loksi Chan; Luo Li, Phanuel Anti
- Starring: Lloyd Wong; Suy Woo Wong
- Production company: bb house
- Release date: 15 February 2025 (Berlinale)
- Running time: 28 minutes
- Country: Canada
- Language: English

Lloyd Wong, Unfinished is a 2025 Canadian short documentary film directed by Lesley Loksi Chan. It tells the story of Chinese-Canadian artist Lloyd Wong, who began a video work about his living with HIV which remained unfinished at the time of his death. Thirty years later, filmmaker Lesley Loksi Chan discovered and edited the material.

It was selected in the Berlinale Shorts section at the 75th Berlin International Film Festival, where it had its World premiere on 15 February and won the Golden Bear for Best Short Film. It also won Teddy Award for the Best Short Film.

== Summary ==
This experimental documentary by Lesley Loksi Chan explores Lloyd Wong’s unfinished project on his life with AIDS in 1990s Toronto. Long thought lost, Wong’s footage was rediscovered after 30 years. Chan integrates it with her research notes, reflecting on queer community archives and the nature of incompletion.

== Cast ==
- Lloyd Wong
- Suy Woo Wong

== Production ==
The development and making of the film in the words of the director Lesley Loksi Chan:

In 2020, artist/activist John Greyson informed me that lost footage from Lloyd Wong’s episode of Toronto Living With AIDS (TLWA) had been found. TLWA, a groundbreaking HIV/AIDS video series (1990–1991), was canceled in its second season due to censorship. Wong’s footage had been stored at Richard Fung’s home for over 30 years before being archived. John invited me to restore it, sparking my curiosity about Wong. Over four years, with mentorship from John and Richard, I worked on this film, largely during my Viral Interventions residency (2021–2022). Created in collaboration with fellow artists, Lloyd Wong, Unfinished is shaped by conversations, Wong’s work, and his recovered footage.

== Release ==
Lloyd Wong, Unfinished had its world premiere on 15 February 2025, as part of the 75th Berlin International Film Festival, in the Berlinale Shorts 2.

On 3 and 11 October 2025, the film was screened in Modes 2 short film programme of 2025 Vancouver International Film Festival along with other 5 short films. On 25 November 2025, it was screened in the National Short or Medium-Length Film Competition at the Montreal International Documentary Festival.

== Reception ==
The film was named to the Toronto International Film Festival's annual year-end Canada's Top Ten list for 2025.

== Accolades ==
Award	Date	Category	Recipient	Result	Ref.
Berlin International Film Festival	23 February 2025	Golden Bear for Best Short Film	Lloyd Wong, Unfinished	Won	
Berlin International Film Festival	23 February 2025	Berlinale Shorts CUPRA Filmmaker Award	Lloyd Wong, Unfinished	Nominated	
Berlin International Film Festival	23 February 2025	Teddy Award for Best Short Films	Lloyd Wong, Unfinished	Won	
Montreal International Documentary Festival	30 November 2025	Best National Short or Medium-Length Film	Lloyd Wong, Unfinished	Won	
