= Nicolette Krebitz =

German actress and director (born 1972)

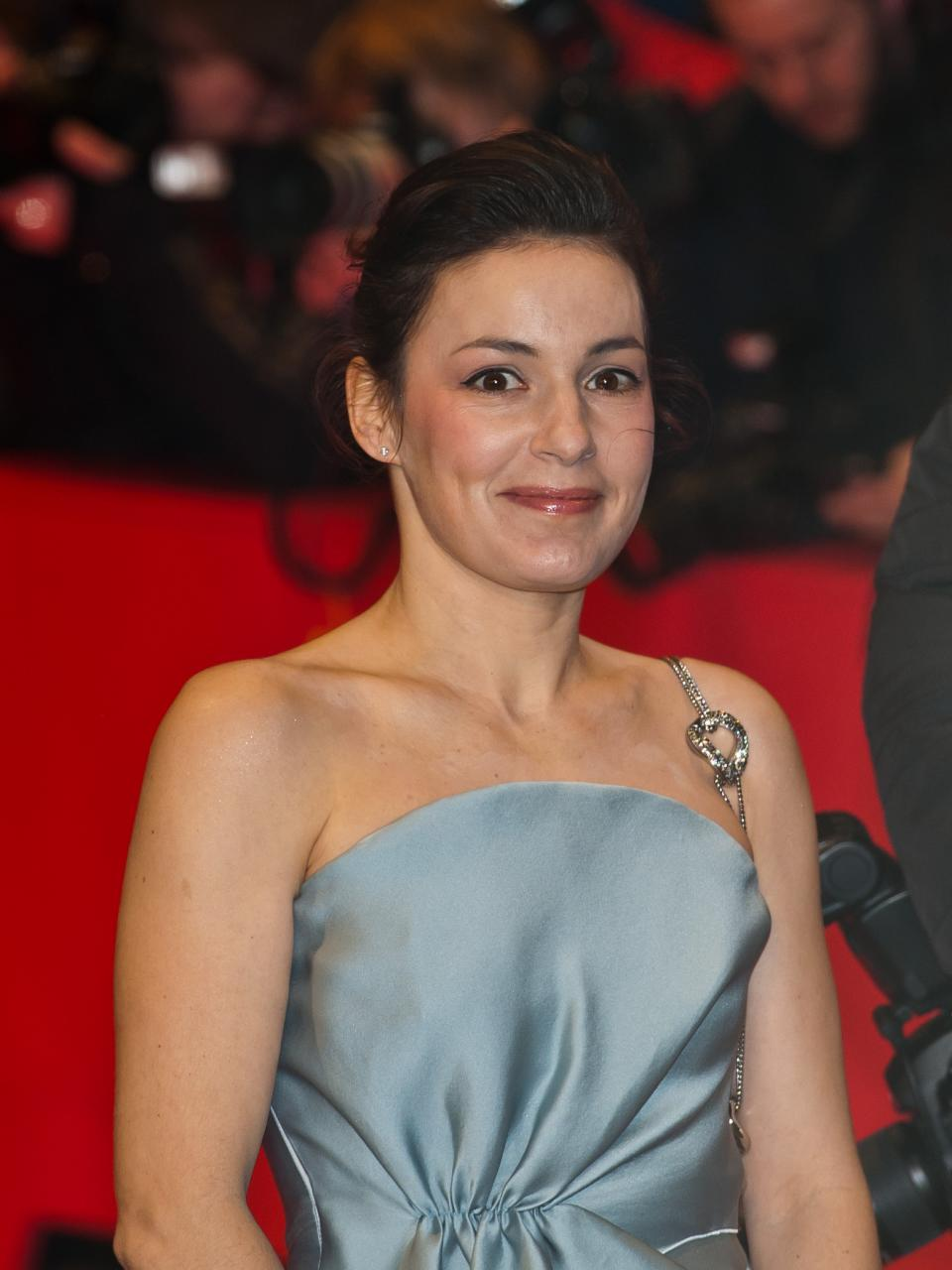
- Krebitz in 2012
- Born: 2 September 1972 (age 53); West Berlin, West Germany
- Other name: Coco
- Occupations: Actress, director, model, singer

Nicolette Krebitz (born 2 September 1972) is a German director, actress, model, and singer. She is often credited as Coco in her creative works.

== Life and work ==
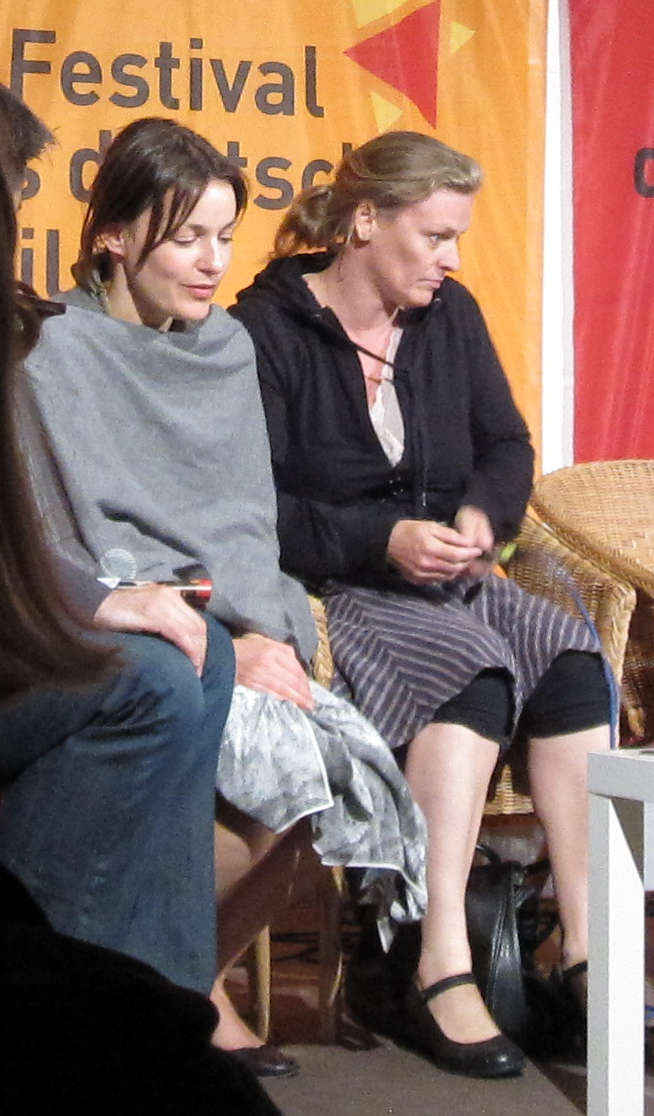
Krebitz (left) with film director Anne Høegh Krohn from Norway at the "Festival des deutschen Films" 2009, Ludwigshafen, Germany

Nicolette Krebitz was born on 2 September 1972 in West Berlin. She made her film debut at age eleven. Later, she hosted television and radio shows for children and attended the Ballett-Centre Berlin and the Fritz-Kirchhoff acting school, also in Berlin.

Krebitz has appeared in over 30 movies, but she is known best for her role in the German-language films Bandits (1997) and Der Tunnel (2001). She also appeared in the English-language film All the Queen's Men (2001). She wrote and directed the 2001 movie Jeans and 2007's The Heart Is a Dark Forest.

She is the model on the cover of New Order's 2001 album Get Ready and its associated singles. Her image is also on the cover and in the sleeve of Terranova's 1999 album Close the Door. She contributed vocals to the Bandits soundtrack and to the Terranova tracks Just Enough, Plastic Stress and Never.

== Tribute ==
The German hip hop group Fettes Brot together with Indie band Tocotronic has dedicated a song to her entitled "Nicolette Krebitz wartet" ("Nicolette Krebitz is Waiting") which is a cover version of the Bananarama hit "Robert De Niro's Waiting...".

== Awards ==
1997 Bavarian Film Award, Best Film Score

== Selected filmography ==
Year	Title	Role	Director	Notes
1993	Durst	Sabine	Martin Weinhart	TV film
1993	Soccer Love	Conny	Bernd Schadewald	TV film
1994	Ausgerechnet Zoé	Zoé	Markus Imboden	TV film
1994	Der Mann mit der Maske	Irene Häussler	Peter Schulze-Rohr	TV film
1994	The Little Innocent	Katja	Rainer Kaufmann	TV film
1995	In the Flesh	Anna	Nikolai Müllerschön	English-language film
1997	Bandits	Angel	Katja von Garnier	
1998	Candy	Candy	Christopher Roth	
1998	The Bubi Scholz Story	Helga Scholz	Roland Suso Richter	TV film
1999	Long Hello and Short Goodbye	Melody	Rainer Kaufmann	
2000	Fandango	Shirley Maus	Matthias Glasner	
2001	The Tunnel	Fritzi Scholz	Roland Suso Richter	TV film
2001	All the Queen's Men	Romy	Stefan Ruzowitzky	English-language film
2002	So schnell du kannst	Linda Wegner	Vivian Naefe	TV film
2004	Between Night and Day	Vera	Nicolai Rohde	TV film
2007	The Heart Is a Dark Forest	—	Nicolette Krebitz	
2010	Relations	Kerstin Schneider	Stefan Kornatz	TV film
2010	The City Below	Svenja Steve	Christoph Hochhäusler	
2012	The Marriage Swindler and His Wife	Nina Gomperz	Manfred Stelzer	TV film
2012	Summer Outside	Anna	Friederike Jehn	
2013	The Blind Spot	Lise Chaussy	Daniel Harrich	
2014	The Lies You Sleep With	Rita	Thomas Roth	TV film
2014	Better Than Nothing	Olga Petrowa	Ute Wieland	
2015	CHIX – Back on Stage	Sascha	Jan Ruzicka	TV film
2016	Wild	—	Nicolette Krebitz	
2019	My Zoe	Émilie	Julie Delpy	
2022	A E I O U - A Quick Alphabet of Love	—	Nicolette Krebitz	
2025	The Light	Milena Engels	Tom Tykwer	Opening film of Berlinale 2025
2025	Hysteria	Lilith	Mehmet Akif Büyükatalay	Premiered at the Berlinale on 14 February.
