= 75th Berlin International Film Festival =

2025 film festival in Berlin, Germany

- Official festival poster
- Opening film: The Light
- Location: Berlin, Germany
- Founded: 1951
- Awards: Golden Bear: Dreams (Sex Love)
- Artistic director: Tricia Tuttle
- Festival date: Opening: 13 February 2025; Closing: 23 February 2025
- Website: www.berlinale.de

Berlin International Film Festival
- 76th 74th

The 75th annual Berlin International Film Festival, usually called the Berlinale, took place between 13 and 23 February 2025 in Berlin, Germany. American filmmaker Todd Haynes was named the Jury President for the main competition. It marked the first edition of Tricia Tuttle as the festival's artistic director after Carlo Chatrian and Mariette Rissenbeek stepped down after the 2024 edition.

Dreams (Sex Love) directed by Dag Johan Haugerud won the Golden Bear. The Silver Bear Grand Jury Prize was awarded to The Blue Trail by Gabriel Mascaro. While the Silver Bear for Best Leading Performance was awarded to Rose Byrne for If I Had Legs I'd Kick You.

The festival opened with German drama film The Light by Tom Tykwer. During the opening ceremony, British actress Tilda Swinton was awarded the Honorary Golden Bear.

== Juries ==
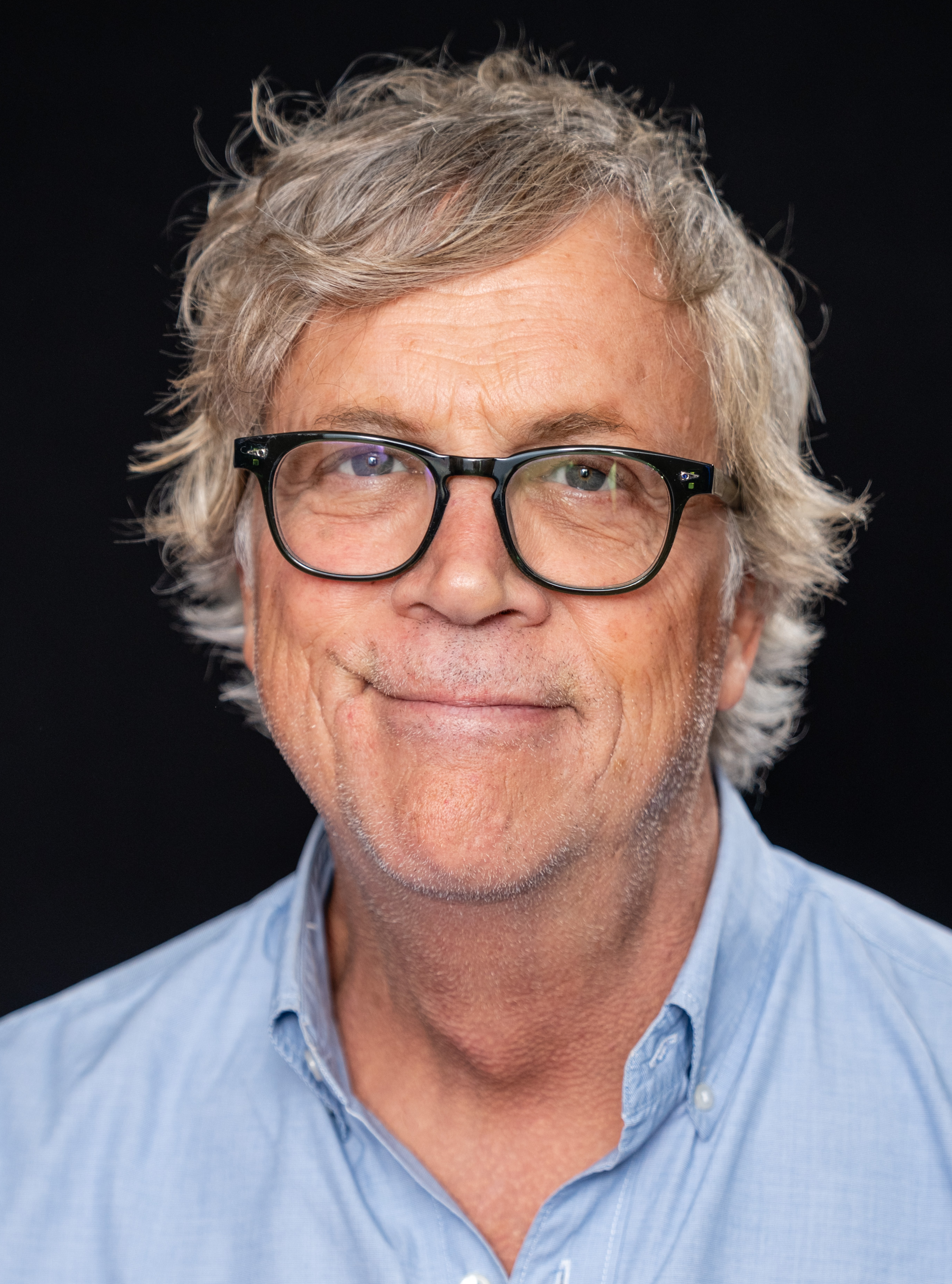
Main competition jury president Todd Haynes

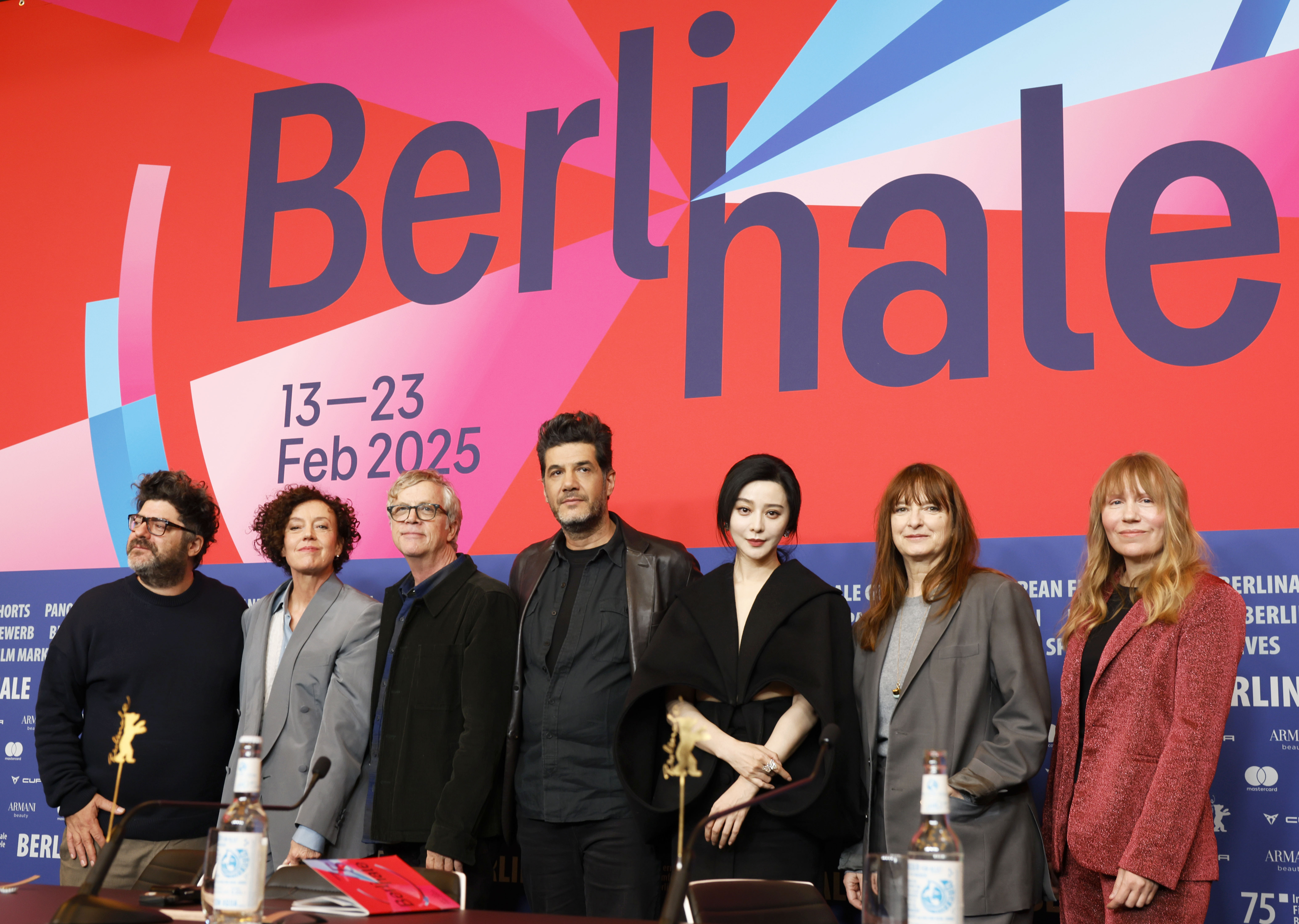
Main competition jury members

=== Main Competition ===
- Todd Haynes, American filmmaker – Jury President
- Fan Bingbing, Chinese actress
- Maria Schrader, German actress and filmmaker
- Rodrigo Moreno, Argentinian filmmaker
- Nabil Ayouch, Franco-Moroccan filmmaker
- Bina Daigeler, German costume designer
- Amy Nicholson, American film critic and author

=== Perspectives Jury (GWFF Best First Feature Award) ===
- Meryam Joobeur, Tunisian filmmaker
- Aïssa Maïga, French actress
- María Zamora, Spanish producer

=== Short Film Competition ===
- Dascha Dauenhauer, German composer
- Jing Haase, Danish producer
- Phạm Ngọc Lân, Vietnamese filmmaker and producer

=== Generation Jury ===
- Emma Branderhorst, Dutch filmmaker
- Ikoro Sekai, Canadian film curator at the Toronto International Film Festival
- Aslı Özarslan, German filmmaker

=== Berlinale Documentary Award Jury ===
- Petra Costa, Brazilian filmmaker
- Lea Glob, Danish filmmaker
- Kazuhiro Soda, Japanese filmmaker

== Official Sections ==
=== Main Competition ===
The following films were selected for the main competition for the Golden Bear on 21 January 2025:

English Title	Original Title	Director(s)	Production Country
Ari		Léonor Serraille	France, Belgium
Blue Moon		Richard Linklater	United States, Ireland
The Blue Trail	O Último Azul	Gabriel Mascaro	Brazil, Mexico, Chile, Netherlands
Dreams		Michel Franco	Mexico, United States
Dreams (Sex Love)	Drømmer	Dag Johan Haugerud	Norway
Girls on Wire	想飞的女孩	Vivian Qu	China
Hot Milk		Rebecca Lenkiewicz	United Kingdom, Greece
The Ice Tower	La Tour de Glace	Lucile Hadžihalilović	France, Germany, Italy
If I Had Legs I'd Kick You		Mary Bronstein	United States
Kontinental '25		Radu Jude	Romania, Brazil, Switzerland, United Kingdom, Luxembourg
Living the Land	生息之地	Huo Meng	China
The Message	El mensaje	Iván Fund	Argentina, Spain
Mother's Baby		Johanna Moder	Austria, Switzerland, Germany
Reflection in a Dead Diamond	Reflet dans un diamant mort	Hélène Cattet and Bruno Forzani	Belgium, Luxembourg, Italy, France
The Safe House	La cache	Lionel Baier	Switzerland, Luxembourg, France
Timestamp	Стрічка часу	Kateryna Gornostai	Ukraine, Luxembourg, Netherlands, France
What Marielle Knows	Was Marielle weiß	Frédéric Hambalek	Germany
What Does That Nature Say to You	그 자연이 네게 뭐라고 하니	Hong Sang-soo	South Korea
Yunan	يونان	Ameer Fakher Eldin	Germany, Canada, Italy, Palestine, Qatar, Jordan, Saudi Arabia

=== Berlinale Special ===
The following films are selected for the Berlinale Special screening:

English Title	Original Title	Director(s)	Production Country
Berlinale Special Gala
After This Death		Lucio Castro	United States
A Complete Unknown		James Mangold	United States
Köln 75		Ido Fluk	Germany, Poland, Belgium
The Light (opening film)	Das Licht	Tom Tykwer	Germany, France
Late Shift	Heldin	Petra Volpe	Switzerland, Germany
Lurker		Alex Russell	United States, Italy
Mickey 17		Bong Joon Ho	United States, South Korea
The Narrow Road to the Deep North (series)		Justin Kurzel	Australia
The Thing with Feathers		Dylan Southern	United Kingdom
Berlinale Special
All I Had Was Nothingness	Je n’avais que le néant – "Shoah" par Lanzmann	Guillaume Ribot	France
Ancestral Visions of the Future		Lemohang Jeremiah Mosese	France, Lesotho, Germany, Saudi Arabia, Qatar
The Best Mother in the World	A melhor mãe do mundo	Anna Muylaert	Brazil, Argentina
Das Deutsche Volk		Marcin Wierzchowski	Germany
Friendship's Death (1987)		Peter Wollen	United Kingdom
Honey Bunch		Madeleine Sims-Fewer and Dusty Mancinelli	Canada
A Letter to David	Michtav Le'David	Tom Shoval	Israel, United States
Islands		Jan-Ole Gerster	Germany
Leibniz – Chronicle of a Lost Painting	Leibniz – Chronik eines verschollenen Bildes	Edgar Reitz and Anatol Schuster	Germany
My Undesirable Friends: Part I — Last Air in Moscow		Julia Loktev	United States
No Beast. So Fierce.	Kein Tier. So Wild.	Burhan Qurbani	Germany, Poland, France
The Old Woman with the Knife	파과	Min Kyu-dong	South Korea
Shoah (1985)		Claude Lanzmann	France

=== Perspectives ===
14 films will be competing for the Best First Feature Award. The following films were selected for the first edition of the Perspectives section:

English Title	Original Title	Director(s)	Production Country
BLKNWS: Terms & Conditions		Kahlil Joseph	United States
The Devil Smokes (and Saves the Burnt Matches in the Same Box)	El Diablo Fuma (y guarda las cabezas de los cerillos quemados en la misma caja)	Ernesto Martínez Bucio	Mexico
Eel	河鰻	Chu Chun-Teng	Taiwan
Growing Down	Minden Rendben	Bálint Dániel Sós	Hungary
How to Be Normal and the Oddness of the Other World	Wie man normal ist und die Merkwürdigkeiten der anderen Welt	Florian Pochlatko	Austria
Little Trouble Girls	Kaj ti je deklica	Urška Djukić	Slovenia, Italy, Croatia, Serbia
Mad Bills to Pay (or Destiny, dile que no soy malo)		Joel Alfonso Vargas	United States
Punching the World	Mit der Faust in die Welt schlagen	Constanze Klaue	Germany
The Settlement	المستعمرة	Mohamed Rashad	Egypt, France, Germany, Qatar, Saudi Arabia
Shadowbox	বাক্স বন্দি	Tanushree Das and Saumyananda Sahi	India, France, United States, Spain
That Summer in Paris	Le rendez-vous de l'été	Valentine Cadic	France
Two Times João Liberada	Duas vezes João Liberada	Paula Tomás Marques	Portugal
We Believe You	On vous croit	Arnaud Dufeys and Charlotte Devillers	Belgium
Where the Night Stands Still	Come la notte	Liryc Dela Cruz	Italy, Philippines

=== Berlinale Short Film Competition ===
The following films are selected for the Berlinale's Short Film Golden Bear Competition section:

English Title	Original Title	Director(s)	Production Country
After Colossus		Timoteus Anggawan Kusno	Italy, Indonesia, Netherlands
Anba dlo		Luiza Calagian and Rosa Caldeira	Cuba, Brazil, Haiti
Because of (U)		Tohé Commaret	France
Casa chica		Lau Charles	Mexico
Ceasefire	Prekid vatre	Jakob Krese	Germany, Italy, Slovenia
Children's Day		Giselle Lin	Singapore
Citizen-Inmate	Dar band	Hesam Eslami	Iran
Close to September	Casi septiembre	Lucía G. Romero	Spain
Extracurricular Activity	课外活动	Dean Wei and Xu Yidan	China
How Are You?	Comment ça va?	Caroline Poggi and Jonathan Vinel	France
In Retrospect	Rückblickend Betrachtet	Daniel Asadi Faezi and Mila Zhluktenko	Germany
Koki, Ciao		Quenton Miller	Netherlands
Living Stones	Élő kövek	Jakob Ladányi Jancsó	Hungary
Lloyd Wong, Unfinished		Lesley Loksi Chan	Canada
Ordinary Life	普通の生活	Yoriko Mizushiri	France, Japan
Mother's Child		Naomi Noir	Netherlands
Sammi, Who Can Detach His Body Parts		Rein Maychaelson	Indonesia
Stone of Destiny	Kámen Osudu	Julie Černá	Czechia
Their Eyes		Nicolas Gourault	France
Through Your Eyes	夏威夷见	Nelson Yeo	Singapore
Berlinale Shorts Special
As Long as Shotguns Remain (2014)	Tant qu'il nous reste des fusils à pompe	Caroline Poggi and Jonathan Vinel	France
Happy Doom (2023)		Billy Roisz	Austria
Night Fishing (2011)	파란만장	Park Chan-wook and Park Chan-kyong	South Korea
Three Stones for Jean Genet (2014)		Frieder Schlaich	Germany
Two Ships (2012)	Vilaine fille mauvais garçon	Justine Triet	France
Vita Lakamaya (2016)		Akihito Izuhara	Japan

=== Panorama ===
The following films were selected for the Panorama section:

English Title	Original Title	Director(s)	Production Country
1001 Frames		Mehrnoush Alia	United States
Beginnings	Begyndelser	Jeanette Nordahl	Denmark, Sweden, Belgium
Cicadas	Zikaden	Ina Weisse	Germany, France
Confidante	Confidente	Çağla Zencirci and Guillaume Giovanetti	Turkey, France, Luxembourg
Deaf	Sorda	Eva Libertad	Spain
Delicious		Nele Mueller-Stöfen	Germany
Dreamers		Joy Gharoro-Akpojotor	United Kingdom
Dreams in Nightmares		Shatara Michelle Ford	United States, Taiwan, United Kingdom
The Good Sister	Schwesterherz	Sarah Miro Fischer	Germany, Spain
The Heart Is a Muscle		Imran Hamdulay	South Africa, Saudi Arabia
Home Sweet Home	Hjem kaere hjem	Frelle Petersen	Denmark
Hysteria		Mehmet Akif Büyükatalay	Germany
The Incredible Snow Woman	L' Incroyable femme des neiges	Sébastien Betbeder	France
Lesbian Space Princess		Emma Hough Hobbs and Leela Varghese	Australia
Looking for Langston (1989)		Isaac Julien	United Kingdom
The Longing	ミックスモダン	Toshizo Fujiwara	Japan
Magic Farm		Amalia Ulman	United States, Argentina
The Moelln Letters	Die Möllner Briefe	Martina Priessner	Germany
Night Stage	Ato Noturno	Marcio Reolon and Filipe Matzembacher	Brazil
Olmo		Fernando Eimbcke	United States, Mexico
Once Again... (Statues Never Die)		Isaac Julien	United Kingdom
Other People's Money (series)	Die Affäre Cum-EX	Dustin Loose and Kaspar Munk	Germany, Denmark, Austria
Peter Hujar's Day		Ira Sachs	United States, Germany
Queerpanorama	眾生相	Jun Li	United States, Hong Kong, China
Silent Sparks	愛作歹	Ping Chu	Taiwan
The Ugly Stepsister	Den stygge stesøsteren	Emilie Blichfeldt	Norway, Poland, Sweden, Denmark
Welcome Home Baby		Andreas Prochaska	Austria, Germany
Panorama Dokumente
Bedrock		Kinga Michalska	Canada
I Want It All	Ich will alles. Hildegard Knef	Luzia Schmid	Germany
Khartoum		Anas Saeed, Rawia Alhag, Ibrahim Snoopy, Timeea M Ahmed and Phil Cox	Sudan, United Kingdom, Germany, Qatar
Letters from Wolf Street	Listy z Wilczej	Arjun Talwar	Poland, Germany
Monk in Pieces		Billy Shebar	United States
Paul		Denis Côté	Canada
Satanic Sow	Satanische Sau	Rosa von Praunheim	Germany
Under the Flags, the Sun	Bajo las banderas, el sol	Juanjo Pereira	Paraguay, Argentina, United States, France, Germany
Yalla Parkour		Areeb Zuaiter	Palestine, Sweden. Qatar, Saudi Arabia

=== Forum ===
The following films were selected for the Forum section:

English Title	Original Title	Director(s)	Production Country
2024 (2023)		Stefan Hayn	Germany
After Dreaming		Christine Haroutounian	United States, Armenia, Mexico
Cadet		Adilkhan Yerzhanov	Kazakhstan
Canone effimero		Gianluca De Serio and Massimiliano De Serio	Italy
Colossal	Colosal	Nayibe Tavares-Abel	Dominican Republic
Eighty Plus	Restitucija, ili, San i java stare garde	Želimir Žilnik	Serbia, Slovenia
Evidence		Lee Anne Schmitt	United States
Fwends		Sophie Somerville	Australia
Holding Liat		Brandon Kramer	United States
Houses	Batim	Veronica Nicole Tetelbaum	Israel, Germany
If You Are Afraid You Put Your Heart into Your Mouth and Smile	Wenn du Angst hast nimmst du dein Herz in den Mund und lächelst	Marie Luise Lehner	Austria
Janine Moves to the Country	Janine zieht aufs Land	Jan Eilhardt	Germany
The Kiss of the Grasshopper	Der Kuss des Grashüpfers	Elmar Imanov	Germany, Luxembourg, Italy
little boy		James Benning	United States
The Memory of Butterflies	La memoria de las mariposas	Tatiana Fuentes Sadowski	Peru, Portugal
Minimals in a Titanic World		Philbert Aimé Mbabazi Sharangabo	Rwanda, Germany, Cameroon
Our Time Will Come	Unsere Zeit wird kommen	Ivette Löcker	Austria
Palliative Care Unit	Palliativstation	Philipp Döring	Germany
Punku		Juan Daniel Fernández Molero	Peru, Spain
Queer as Punk	酷兒解放曲	Yihwen Chen	Malaysia, Indonesia
The Sense of Violence	폭력의 감각	Kim Mooyoung	South Korea
Sirens Call		Miri Ian Gossing and Lina Sieckmann	Germany, Netherlands
Spring Night	봄밤	Kang Mi-ja	South Korea
The Swan Song of Fedor Ozerov		Yuri Semashko	Lithuania
Tiger's Pond	Vaghachipani	Natesh Hegde	India, Singapore
Time to the Target	Chas pidlotu	Vitaly Mansky	Latvia, Czechia, Ukraine
The Trio Hall	三廳電影	Su Hui-yu	Taiwan
Underground	アンダーグラウンド	Kaori Oda	Japan
What's Next?	然后呢	Cao Yiwen	Hong Kong, China
When Lightning Flashes Over the Sea		Eva Neymann	Germany, Ukraine
Forum Expanded
Alternative Monument for Germany	Alternatives Denkmal für Deutschland (ADfD)	Alternative Monument	Germany
beneath the placid lake		Kush Badhwar and Vyjayanthi Rao	India, Finland
Chang Gyeong	창경	Jangwook Lee	South Korea
Cobalt	Mikuba	Petna Ndaliko Katondolo	Congo, United States
Extra Life (and Decay)		Stéphanie Lagarde	Netherlands, France
I Believe the Portrait Saved Me	Mua besoj më shpëtoj portreti	Alban Muja	Kosovo, Netherlands
J-N-N		Ginan Seidl	Germany
The Last Day	Akher Youm	Mahmoud Ibrahim	Egypt
Letters from Absurd	Cartas do Absurdo	Gabraz Sanna	Brazil
Miraculous Accident		Assaf Gruber	Germany, Austria
Mirage: Eigenstate		Riar Rizaldi	Indonesia, United Kingdom, Portugal
Mountain Roars		Chonchanok Thanatteepwong and Pobwarat Maprasob	Thailand
The Orchards	Al Basateen	Antoine Chapon	France, Austria
Photosynthesizing Dead in Warehouse	광합성하는 죽음	Jeamin Cha	South Korea
Portals	Portales	Elena Duque	Spain
RAPTURE		Alisa Berger	France, Germany
Rumble	Pidikwe	Caroline Monnet	Canada
Sinking Suns		Neda Saeedi	Austria, Germany
Special Operation	Spetsialna Operatsiia (Спеціальна операція)	Oleksiy Radynski	Ukraine, Lithuania
STARS		STARS Collective	United Kingdom, Germany
Tin City		Feargal Ward	Ireland
When the Sun is Eaten	Chi'bal K'iin	Kevin Jerome Everson	United States
Wilfred Buck		Lisa Jackson	Canada
Zizi (or Praying to a Fabulous Tree)	Zizi (ou oração da jaca fabulosa)	Felipe M. Bragança	Brazil
Forum Special
Fruit Farm	果场	Nana Xu	Germany, China
Inner Blooming Springs	Shinagani gazapkhulebis q'vaviloba	Tiku Kobiashvili	Georgia
Iracema (1975)	Iracema: Uma Transa Amazônica	Jorge Bodanzky and Orlando Senna	Brazil, West Germany
The Lie (1987)	Das falsche Wort	Katrin Seybold	West Germany
The Long Road to the Director's Chair		Vibeke Løkkeberg	Norway
My Armenian Phantoms	Mes fantômes arméniens	Tamara Stepanyan	France, Armenia
Nudity	Nagota	Sabina Bakaeva	Uzbekistan, France
Scars of a Putsch		Nathalie Borgers	Austria, Belgium

=== Generation ===
The following films were selected for the Generation sections:

English Title	Original Title	Director(s)	Production Country
Generation Kplus
Akababuru: Expression of Astonishment	Akababuru: Expresión de asombro	Irati Dojura Landa Yagarí	Colombia
Autokar (short)		Sylwia Szkiłądź	Belgium, France
The Botanist	植物学家	Jing Yi	China
Circusboy	Zirkuskind	Julia Lemke and Anna Koch	Germany
Down in the Dumps	Tief unten	Vera van Wolferen	Netherlands
Finte (short)	Ruse	Rhea Shukla	India
Juanita (short)		Karen Joaquín and Uliane Tatit	Spain
The Leap (short)	El paso	Roberto Tarazona	Cuba
Little Rebels Cinema Club (short)		Khozy Rizal	Indonesia
Maya, Give Me a Title	Maya, donne-moi un titre	Michel Gondry	France
The Nature of Invisible Things	A Natureza das Coisas Invisíveis	Rafaela Camelo	Brazil, Chile
On a Sunday at Eleven (short)		Alicia K. Harris	Canada
Only on Earth		Robin Petré	Denmark, Spain
Seaside Serendipity	海辺へ行く道	Satoko Yokohama	Japan
Space Cadet		Kid Koala	Canada
A Story About Fire	燃比娃	Li Wenyu	China
Tales From the Magic Garden	Pohádky Po Babičce	David Súkup, Patrik Pašš, Leon Vidmar and Jean-Claude Rozec	Czechia, Slovakia, Slovenia, France
The Thief (short)	Anngeerdardardor	Christoffer Rizvanovic Stenbakken	Denmark, Greenland
White Ochre (short)	Ornmol	Marlikka Perdrisat	Australia
Generation 14plus
Barbed Wire	Arame farpado	Gustavo de Carvalho	Brazil
Beneath Which Rivers Flow (short)		Ali Yahya	Iraq
Christy		Brendan Canty	United Kingdom, Ireland
Don't Wake the Sleeping Child (short)	Ne réveillez pas l'enfant qui dort	Kevin Aubert	Senegal, France, Morocco
Fantas (short)		Halima Elkhatabi	Canada
Howl (short)		Domini Marshall	Australia
Julian and the Wind (short)		Connor Jessup	Canada
The Mud Under My Window (short)	Sous ma fenêtre, la boue	Violette Delvoye	France, Belgium
Our Wildest Days	I Agries Meres Mas	Vasilis Kekatos	Greece, France
Paternal Leave		Alissa Jung	Germany, Italy
Playtime	Hora do Recreio	Lúcia Murat	Brazil
Quaker (short)		Giovanna Molina	United States
Sandbag Dam	Zečji nasip	Čejen Černić Čanak	Croatia, Lithuania, Slovenia
Sunset Over America	Atardecer en América	Matías Rojas Valencia	Brazil, Chile, Colombia
Sunshine		Antoinette Jadaone	Philippines
The Tale of Daye’s Family	Daye: Seret Ahl El Daye	Karim El Shenawy	Egypt
Têtes Brûlées		Maja Ajmia Yde Zellama	Belgium
Village Rockstars 2		Rima Das	India, Singapore
Wish You Were Ear (short)		Mirjana Balogh	Hungary
Wrong Husband	Uiksaringitara	Zacharias Kunuk	Canada
Generation 14plus – Special Screenings
Underage (series)	De menor	Caru Alves de Souza	Brazil

=== Berlinale Classics ===
The following films were selected for the Berlinale Classics section:

English Title	Original Title	Director(s)	Production Country
Dirty Harry (1971)		Don Siegel	United States
Dressed in Blue (1983)	Vestida de azul	Antonio Giménez-Rico	Spain
The Goddess (1934)	神女	Wu Yonggang	China
Hell's Angels (1930)		Howard Hughes and James Whale	United States
The Paradine Case (1947)		Alfred Hitchcock	United States
Smile at Last (1985)	Naerata ometi	Leida Laius and Arvo Iho	Soviet Union
Solo Sunny (1980)		Konrad Wolf and Wolfgang Kohlhaase	East Germany
The Wife of Seisaku (1965)	清作の妻	Yasuzō Masumura	Japan

=== Retrospective ===
The following films were selected for the Retrospective section:

English Title	Original Title	Director(s)	Production Country
Bloody Friday (1972)	Blutiger Freitag	Rolf Olsen	West Germany, Italy
The Brutes (1970)	Mädchen mit Gewalt	Roger Fritz	West Germany
Carnations in Aspic (1976)	Nelken in Aspik	Günter Reisch	East Germany
Deadlock (1970)		Roland Klick	West Germany
Don't Cheat, Darling! (1973)	Nicht schummeln, Liebling!	Joachim Hasler	East Germany
The Girls from Atlantis (1970)	Männer sind zum Lieben da	Eckhart Schmidt	West Germany
Hat Off When You Kiss (1971)	Hut ab, wenn du küsst!	Rolf Losansky	East Germany
Jonathan (1970)		Hans W. Geißendörfer	West Germany
Lady Dracula (1978)		Franz Josef Gottlieb	West Germany
One or the Other of Us (1974)	Einer von uns beiden	Wolfgang Petersen	West Germany
Orpheus in the Underworld (1973)	Orpheus in der Unterwelt	Horst Bonnet	East Germany
Rocker (1972)		Klaus Lemke	West Germany
Spare Parts (1979)	Fleisch	Rainer Erler	West Germany
Strange City (1972)	Fremde Stadt	Rudolf Thome	West Germany
The Tenderness of Wolves (1973)	Die Zärtlichkeit der Wölfe	Ulli Lommel	West Germany

=== Berlinale EFM ===
The following films were selected for the out of competition EFM section:

- 100 Liters of Gold, directed by Teemu Nikki (Finland)
- Abode of Down, directed by Kristina Shtubert (Germany)
- About Woman, directed by Maurice Trouwborst (Netherlands)
- Forbidden City, directed by Gabriele Mainetti (Italy)
- Loss of Balance, directed by Korek Bojanowski (Poland)
- Luisa, directed by Julia Roesler (Germany)
- The Last Beautiful Thing, directed by Luca Luongo (Italy)
- Muganga, directed by Marie-Hélène Roux (France)
- Mr. Burton, directed by Marc Evans (United Kingdom)
- Silent Storms, directed by Dania Reymond-Boughenou (France)
- That Summer in Paris, directed by Valentine Cadic (France)
- The Art Whisperer, directed by Flemming Fynsk (United States)
- The Perfect Gamble, directed by Danny Abeckaser (United States)
- The Things You Kill, directed by Alireza Khatami (France, Canada)
- The Rule of Jenny Pen, directed by James Ashcroft (New Zealand)
- Vena, directed by Chiara Fleischhacker (Germany)
- Vindicta, directed by Dominik Sedlar (Croatia)

== Official Awards ==
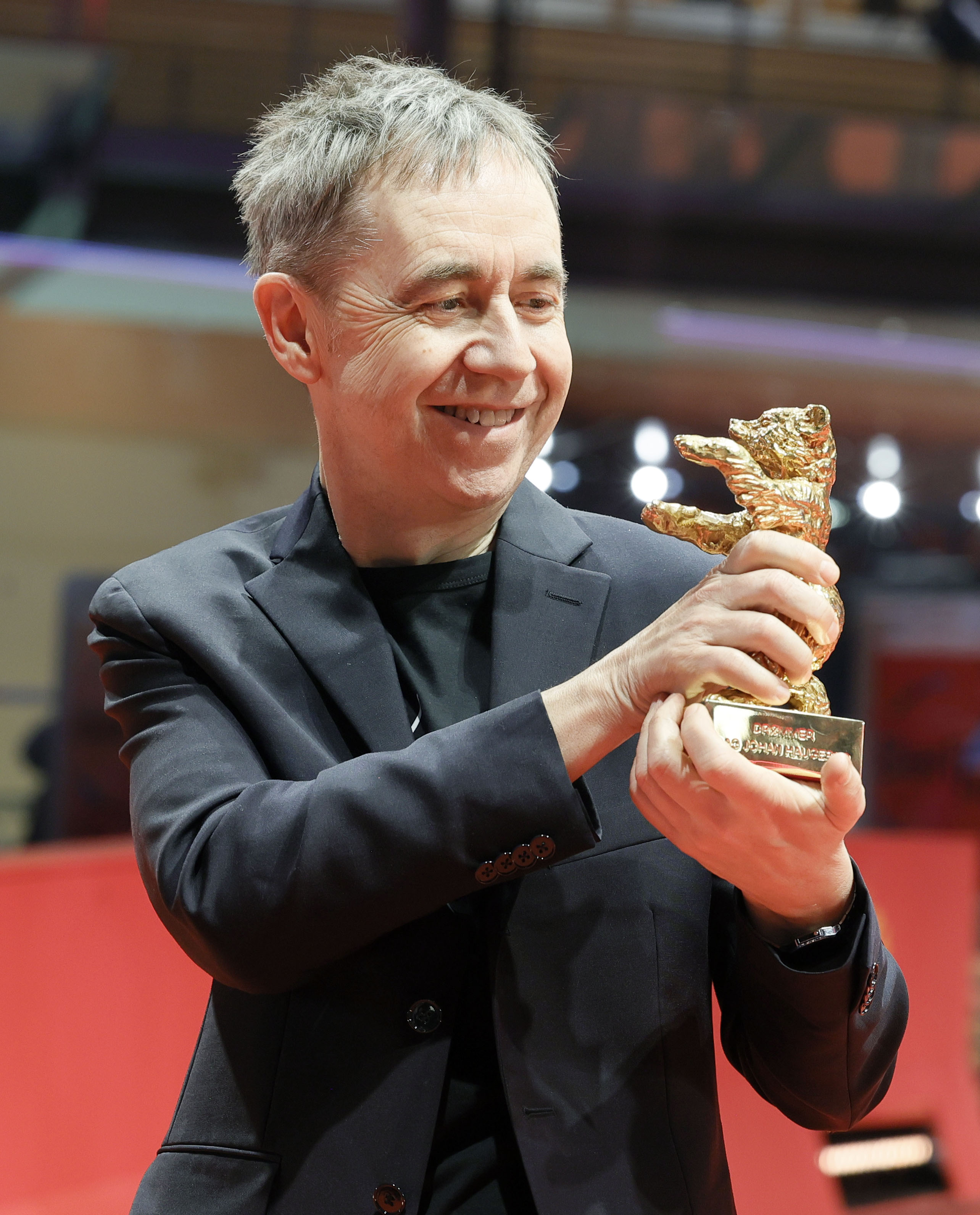
Dag Johan Haugerud, Golden Bear winner

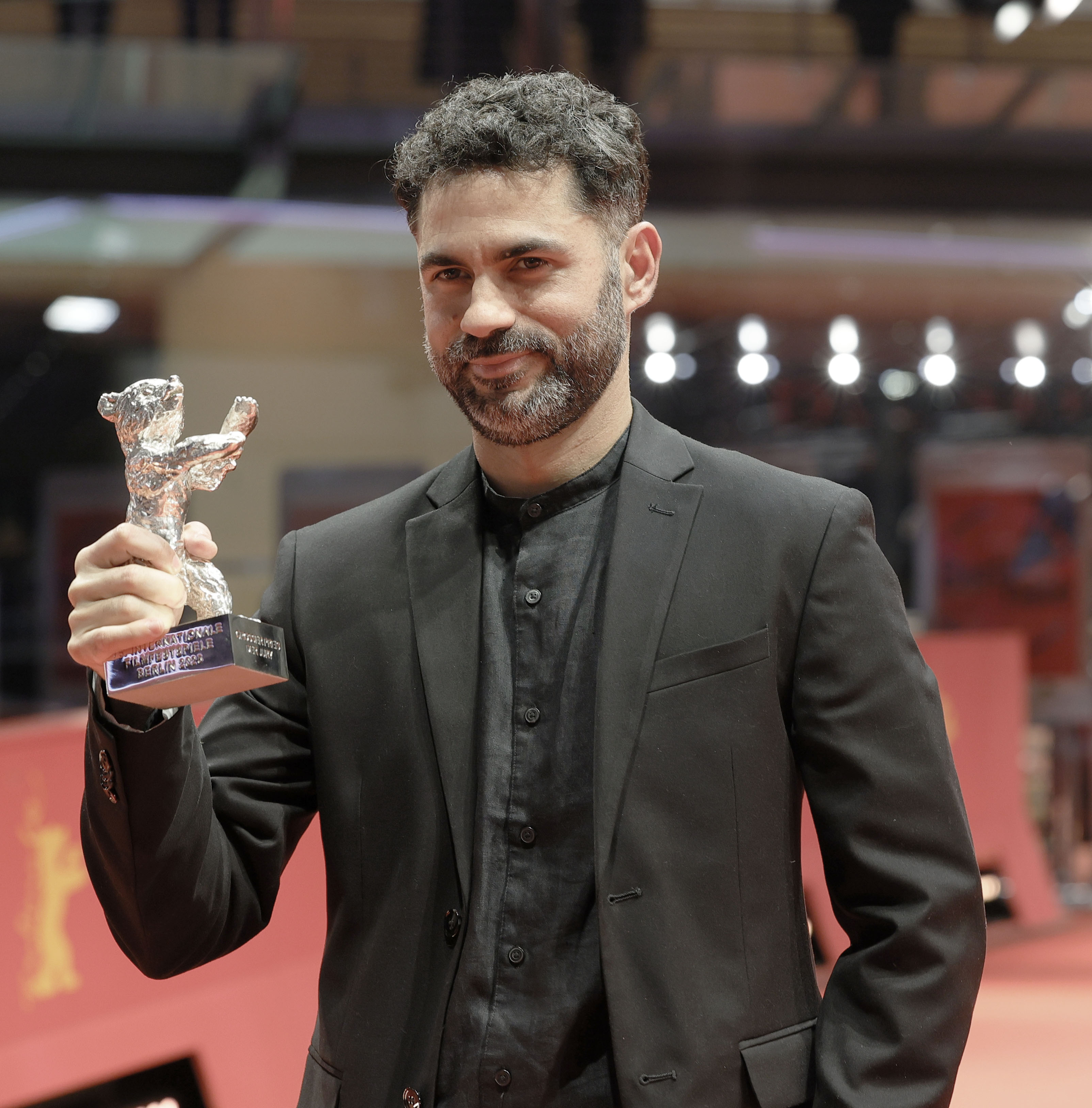
Gabriel Mascaro, Silver Bear Grand Jury Prize winner

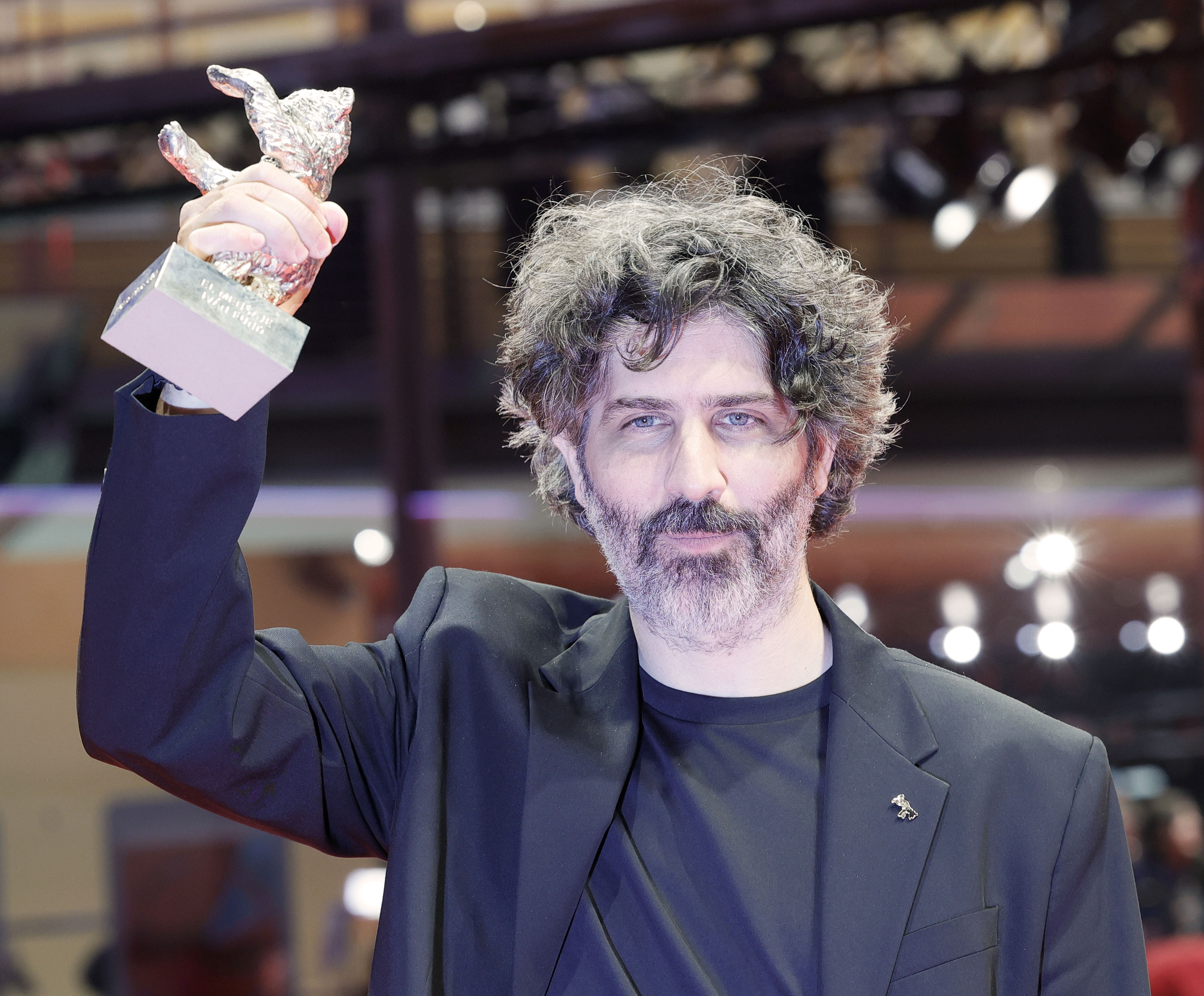
Iván Fund, Silver Bear Jury Prize winner

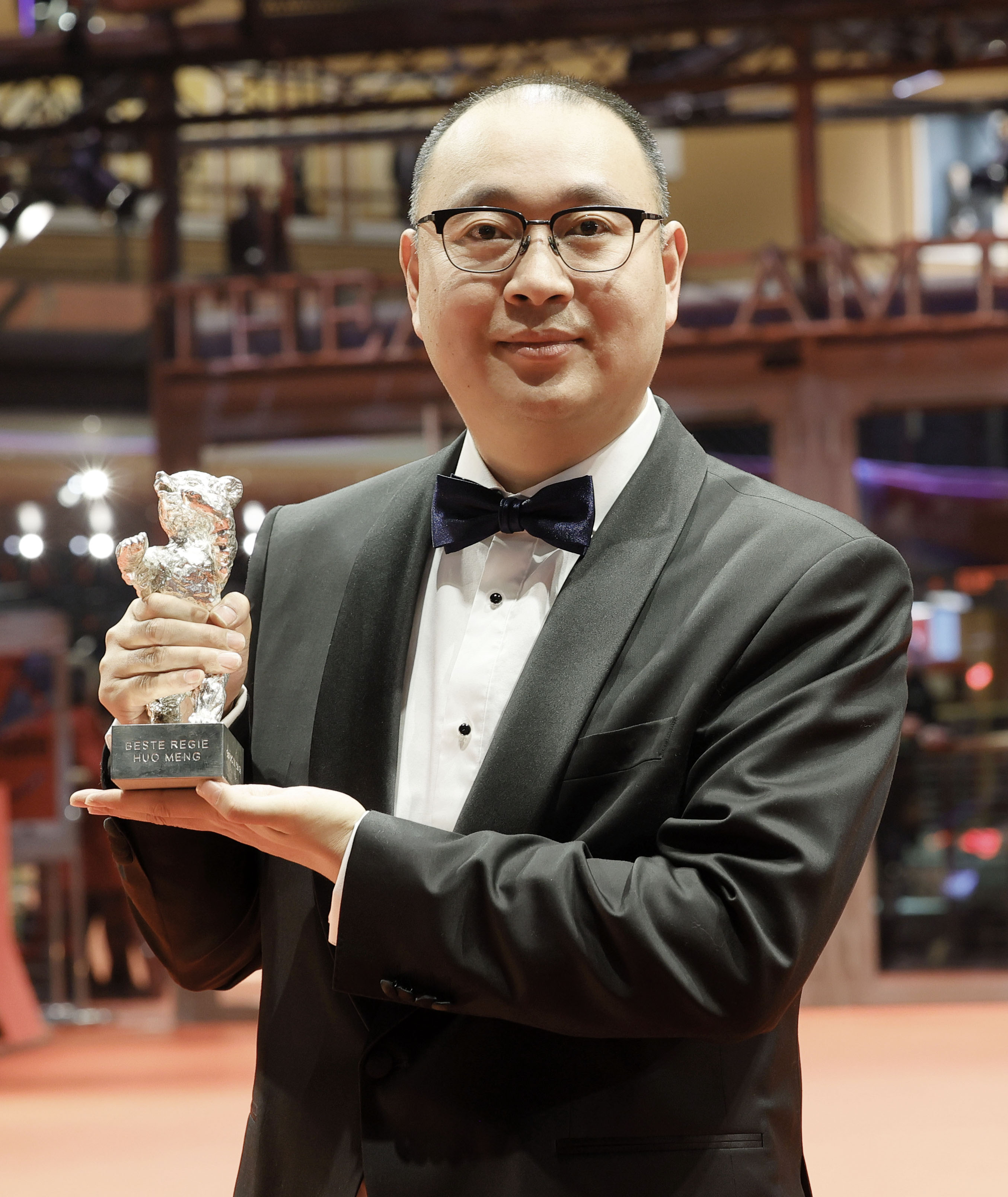
Huo Meng, Silver Bear for Best Director winner

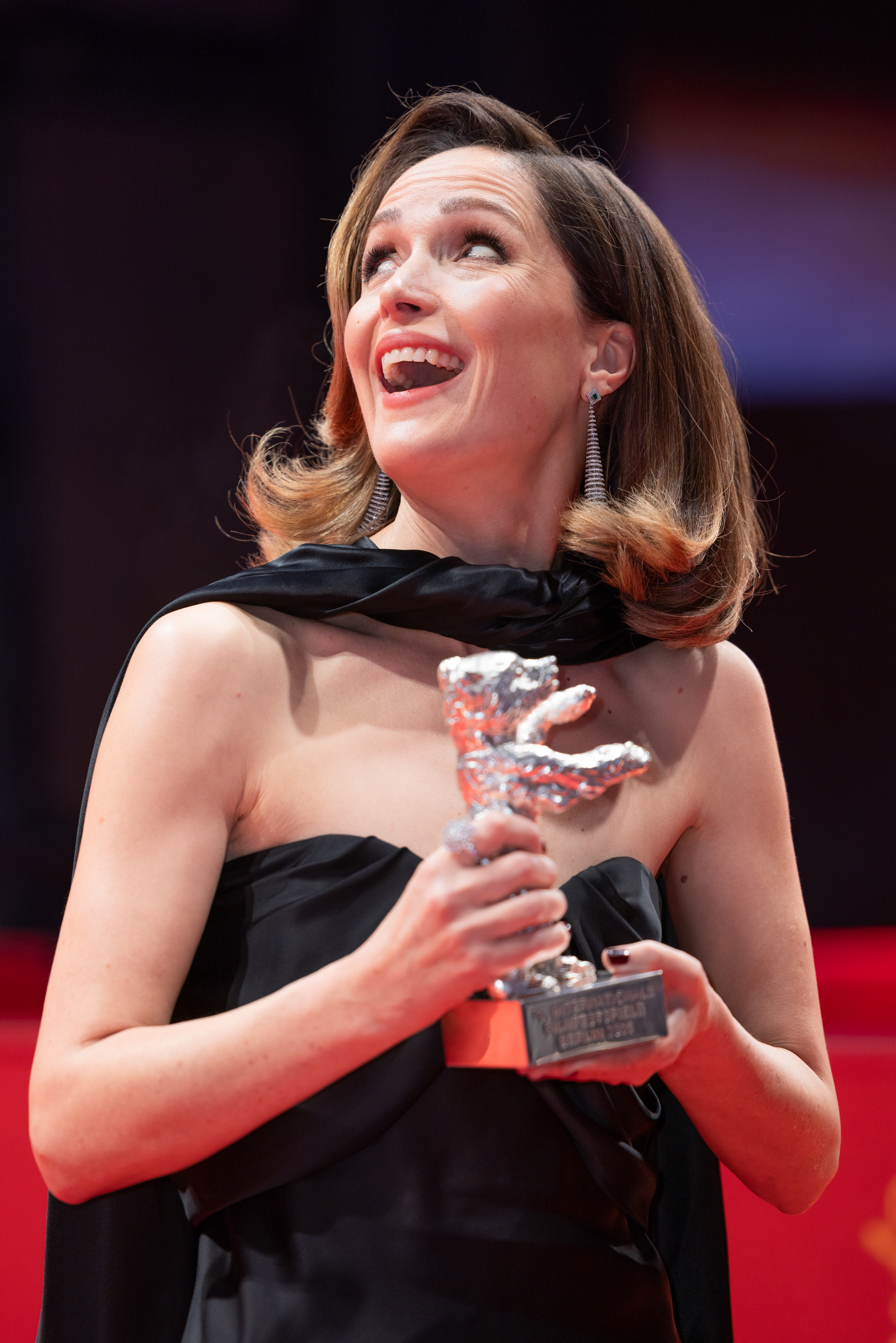
Rose Byrne, Silver Bear for Best Performance winner

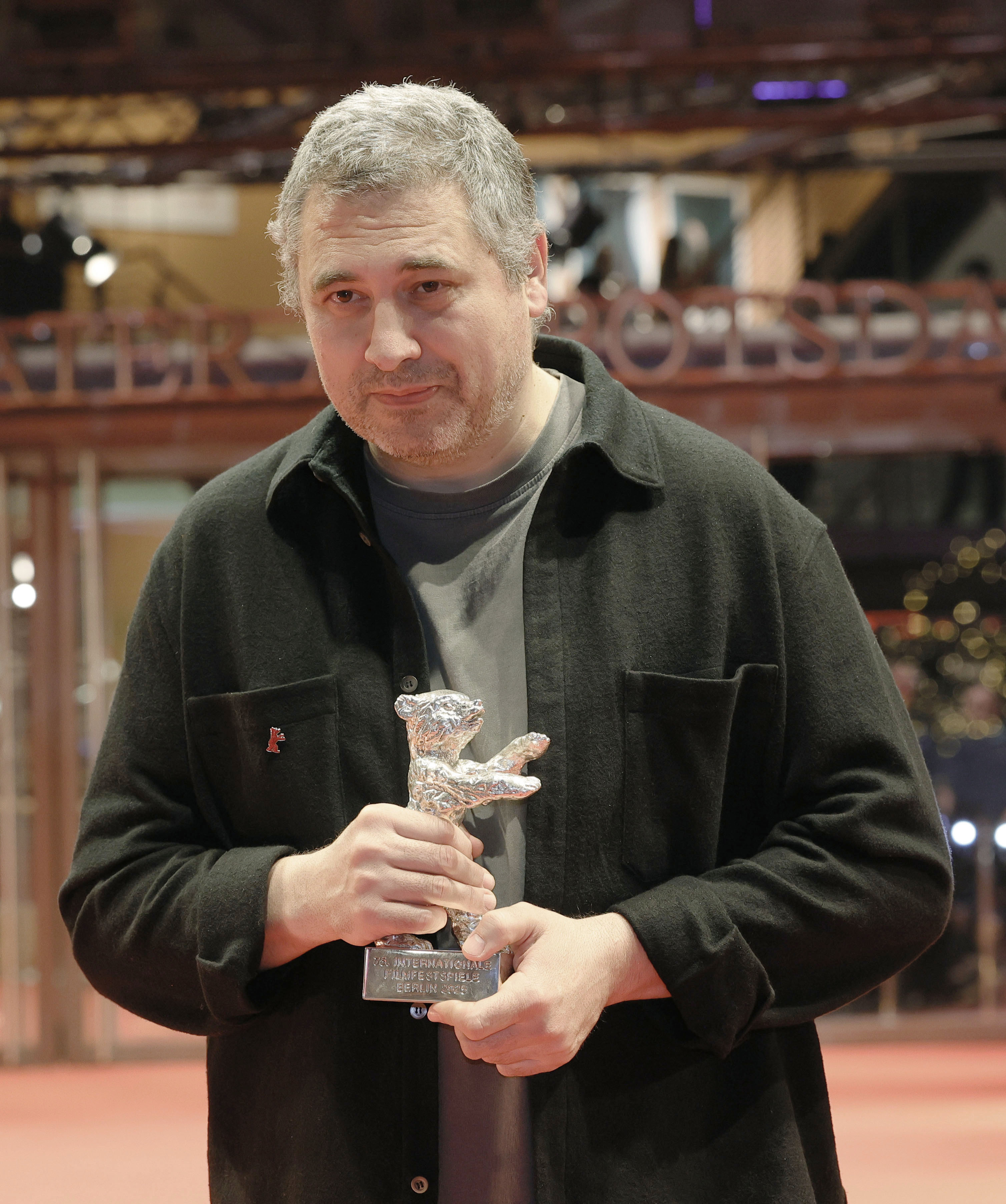
Radu Jude, Silver Bear for Best Screenplay winner

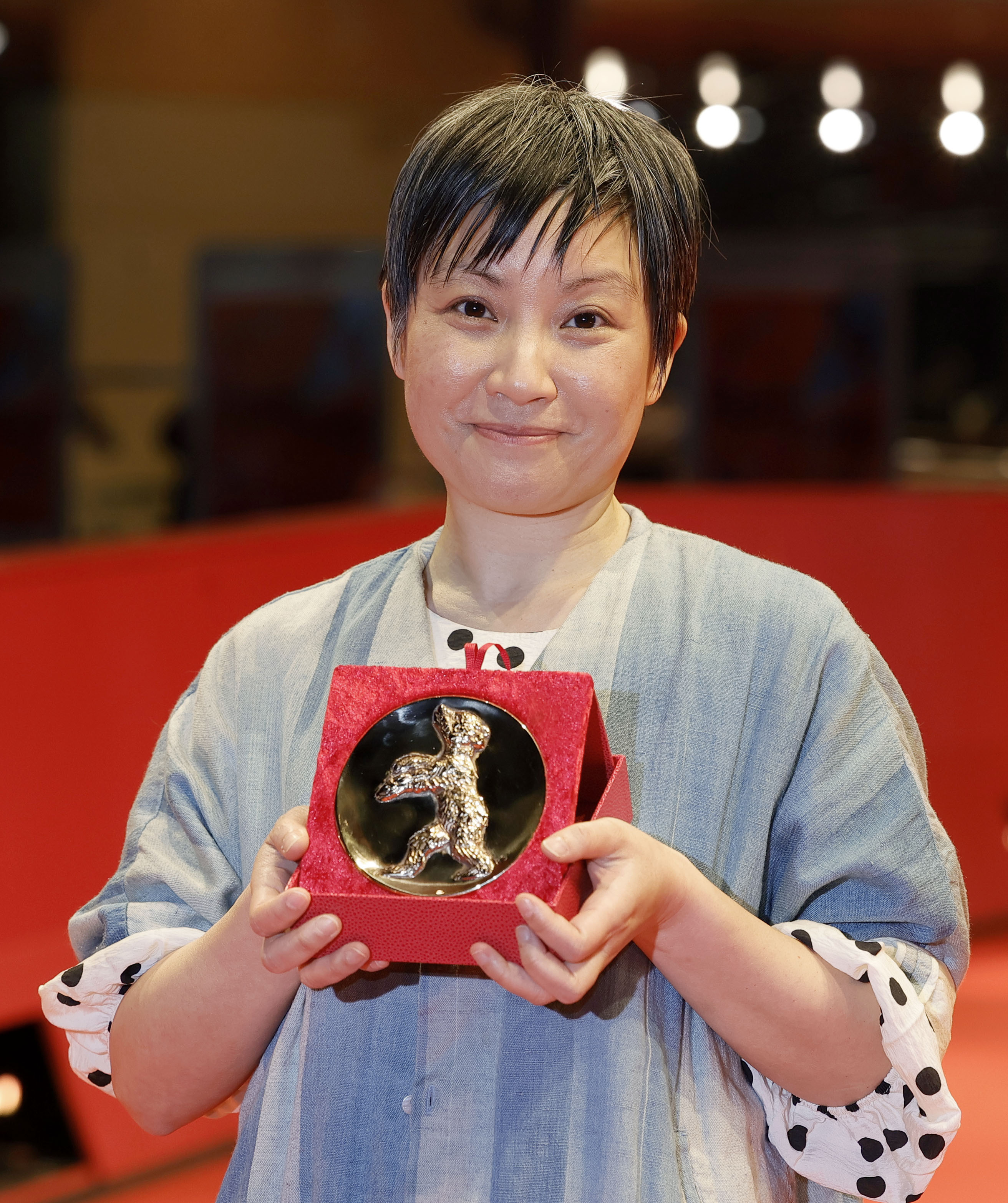
Lesley Loksi Chan, Short Film Golden Bear winner

=== Main Competition ===
- Golden Bear: Dreams (Sex Love) by Dag Johan Haugerud
- Silver Bear Grand Jury Prize: The Blue Trail by Gabriel Mascaro
- Silver Bear Jury Prize: The Message by Iván Fund
- Silver Bear for Best Director: Huo Meng for Living the Land
- Silver Bear for Best Leading Performance: Rose Byrne for If I Had Legs I'd Kick You
- Silver Bear for Best Supporting Performance: Andrew Scott for Blue Moon
- Silver Bear for Best Screenplay: Radu Jude for Kontinental '25
- Silver Bear for Outstanding Artistic Contribution: Lucile Hadžihalilović and the creative ensemble of The Ice Tower

=== Honorary Golden Bear ===
- Tilda Swinton

=== Berlinale Camera ===
- Rainer Rother

=== GWFF Best First Feature Award ===
- The Devil Smokes (and Saves the Burnt Matches in the Same Box) by Ernesto Martínez Bucio
  - Special Mention: We Believe You by Arnaud Dufeys and Charlotte Devillers

=== Berlinale Documentary Award ===
- Holding Liat by Brandon Kramer
  - Special Mention:
    - The Memory of Butterflies by Tatiana Fuentes Sadowski
    - Canone effimero by Gianluca De Serio, Massimiliano De Serio

=== Berlinale Short Films Competition ===
- Golden Bear for Best Short Film: Lloyd Wong, Unfinished by Lesley Loksi Chan
- Silver Bear for Best Short Film: Ordinary Life by Yoriko Mizushiri
- CUPRA Special Award: Koki, Ciao by Quenton Miller

=== Generation ===
==== Generation Kplus – Children's Jury ====
- Crystal Bear for the Best Film: Maya, Give Me a Title by Michel Gondry
  - Special Mention: Circusboy by Julia Lemke and Anna Koch
- Crystal Bear for the Best Short Film: Little Rebels Cinema Club by Khozy Rizal
  - Special Mention: Down in the Dumps by Vera van Wolferen

==== Generation 14plus – Youth Jury Awards ====
- Crystal Bear for the Best Film: Sunshine by Antoinette Jadaone
  - Special Mention: Playtime by Lúcia Murat
- Crystal Bear for the Best Short Film: Wish You Were Ear by Mirjana Balogh
  - Special Mention: Sunset over America by Matías Rojas Valencia

==== Generation Kplus – International Jury ====
- Grand Prix for the Best Film in Generation Kplus: The Botanist by Jing Yi
  - Special Mention: Seaside Serendipity by Satoko Yokohama
- Special Prize for the Best Short Film in Generation Kplus: Autokar by Sylwia Szkiłądź
  - Special Mention: Akababuru: Expression of Astonishment by Irati Dojura Landa Yagarí

==== Generation 14plus – International Jury ====
- Grand Prix for the Best Film in Generation 14plus: Christy by Brendan Canty
  - Special Mention: Têtes Brûlées by Maja-Ajmia Yde Zellama
- Special Prize for the Best Short Film in Generation 14plus: Don’t Wake the Sleeping Child by Kevin Aubert
  - Special Mention: Beneath Which Rivers Flow by Ali Yahya

== Independent Awards ==
=== Prize of the Ecumenical Jury ===
- The Blue Trail by Gabriel Mascaro (Competition)
- The Heart Is a Muscle by Imran Hamdulay (Panorama)
- Holding Liat by Brandon Kramer (Forum)

=== FIPRESCI Prizes ===
- Dreams (Sex Love) by Dag Johan Haugerud (Competition)
- Little Trouble Girls by Urška Djukić (Perspectives)
- Under the Flags, the Sun by Juanjo Pereira (Panorama)
- The Memory of Butterflies by Tatiana Fuentes Sadowski (Forum)

=== Panorama Audience Award ===
- Deaf by Eva Libertad
- 2nd Place: Lesbian Space Princess by Emma Hough Hobbs and Leela Varghese
- 3rd Place: Home Sweet Home by Frelle Petersen

=== Panorama Audience Award – Documentary ===
- The Moelln Letters by Martina Priessner
- 2nd Place: Yalla Parkour by Areeb Zuaiter
- 3rd Place: Khartoum by Anas Saeed, Rawia Alhag, Ibrahim Snoopy, Timeea M Ahmed and Phil Cox

=== Teddy Award ===
- Best Feature Film: Lesbian Space Princess by Emma Hough Hobbs and Leela Varghese
- Best Documentary: Satanic Sow by Rosa von Praunheim
- Best Short Film: Lloyd Wong, Unfinished by Lesley Loksi Chan
- Jury Award: If You Are Afraid You Put Your Heart into Your Mouth and Smile by Marie Luise Lehner
- Special Award: Todd Haynes

=== Prize of the Guild of German Arthouse cinemas ===
- Dreams (Sex Love) by Dag Johan Haugerud
  - Special Mention: What Marielle Knows by Frédéric Hambalek

=== C.I.C.A.E. Art Cinema Award ===
- Deaf by Eva Libertad (Panorama)
- If You Are Afraid You Put Your Heart into Your Mouth and Smile by Marie Luise Lehner (Forum)

=== Label Europa Cinemas ===
- Hysteria by Mehmet Akif Büyükatalay

=== Caligari Film Prize ===
- Fwends by Sophie Somerville

=== Peace Film Prize ===
- Khartoum by Anas Saeed, Rawia Alhag, Ibrahim Snoopy, Timeea M Ahmed and Phil Cox
  - Special Mention: Queer as Punk by Yihwen Chen

=== Amnesty International Film Award ===
- The Moelln Letters by Martina Priessner

=== Heiner Carow Prize ===
- Palliative Care Unit by Philipp Döring

=== Prize AG Kino – Gilde – Cinema Vision 14plus ===
- Paternal Leave by Alissa Jung
  - Special Mention: Têtes brûlées by Maja-Ajmia Yde Zellama

=== Berliner Morgenpost Readers' Jury Award ===
- The Blue Trail by Gabriel Mascaro

=== Tagesspiegel Readers' Jury Award ===
- The Swan Song of Fedor Ozerov by Yuri Semashko
