= After Dreaming =

- Promotional release poster
- Directed by: Christine Haroutounian
- Written by: Christine Haroutounian
- Produced by: Brad Becker-Parton; Christine Haroutounian
- Starring: Davit Beybutyan; Veronika Poghosyan
- Cinematography: Evgeny Rodin
- Edited by: Kiss Karamian
- Production companies: Mankazar; Estudios Splendor Omnia; Kinoket Productions; Seaview Productions
- Release date: February 14, 2025 (Berlinale)
- Running time: 105 minutes
- Countries: Armenia; United States; Mexico
- Language: Armenian

After Dreaming (Armenian: Երազելուց հետո) is a 2025 surrealist drama road movie written, co-produced and directed by Christine Haroutounian in her directorial debut. It stars Davit Beybutyan and Veronika Poghosyan. It follows an Armenian soldier who guides a young woman through a war-torn path, forging an unexpected relationship while keeping a secret from her.

== Synopsis ==
In post-war Armenia, a well digger is killed by villagers who mistake him for an enemy. They ask Atom, a gaunt soldier, to take Claudette for a road trip until the funeral is over. Along the way, the two forge a bond and discuss the state of the country.

== Cast ==
- Davit Beybutyan as Atom
- Veronika Poghosyan as Claudette

== Release ==
The film had its world premiere on February 14, 2025, at the 75th Berlin International Film Festival in the Forum section, then screened on July 14, 2025, at the 22nd Yerevan International Film Festival, and on July 21, 2025, at the 42nd Jerusalem Film Festival.

== Accolades ==
Year	Award / Festival	Category	Recipient	Result	Ref.
2025	75th Berlin International Film Festival	FIPRESCI Prize - Forum	After Dreaming	Nominated	
2025	22nd Yerevan International Film Festival	Golden Apricot	After Dreaming	Nominated	
