= Sirens Call =

2025 documentary film by Miri Ian Gossing, Lina Sieckmann

- Theatrical release poster
- Directed by: Miri Ian Gossing; Lina Sieckmann
- Screenplay by: Miri Ian Gossing; Lina Sieckmann
- Produced by: Mehmet Akif Büyükatalay; Miri Ian Gossing; Claus Herzog-Reichel; Lina Sieckmann
- Starring: Gina Rønning; Moth Rønning-Bötel; Rei Spider Barnes; Jason Bötel; Mark Ginsberg
- Cinematography: Christian Kochmann
- Edited by: Christoph Bargfrede
- Music by: Simon Waskow
- Production companies: Schalten und Walten; filmfaust; Elbe Stevens Films
- Distributed by: Syndicado
- Release date: 14 February 2025 (Berlinale)
- Running time: 121 minutes
- Countries: Netherlands; Germany
- Language: English

Sirens Call is a 2025 hybrid film combining documentary, Science fiction and road movie. The film is written and directed by Miri Ian Gossing, Lina Sieckmann in their directorial debut. The film depicts a nomadic siren journeys through a scattered Earth, navigating biography, identity, and belonging while challenging tensions between mythology and postmodern reality.

The film was selected in Forum at the 75th Berlin International Film Festival, where it had first screening on 14 February 2025. It is also selected for 39th Teddy Award, and will compete for Best Documentary Film.

== Summary ==
Miri Ian Gossing and Lina Sieckmann’s debut feature film with a queer, feminist, and technoid aesthetic, challenges standardized norms, using its genre-blending style as a space for alternative ways of living. It explores the merfolk subculture through Una, a nomadic siren navigating a drought-stricken, postmodern world. Blending performance, fiction, and documentary, the film follows Una’s journey of self-discovery, from American diners to a road trip with Moth, set against Trump-era United States. Eventually, they join activist merpeople in Portland, reclaiming hybrid existence from consumerist culture.

== Cast ==
- Gina Rønning
- Moth Rønning-Bötel
- Rei Spider Barnes
- Jason Bötel
- Mark Ginsberg

== Production ==
Principal photography began on 4 November 2020 at location in Portland (Oregon), San Francisco & Las Vegas (California), Washington State, Utah, Idaho, Nevada, Hawaii, Cologne, and Hanover. Filming ended on 24 September 2022 in locations in Egypt and USA. Film was shot on 16mm camera.

== Release ==
Sirens Call had its world premiere in the Forum section of the 75th Berlin International Film Festival on 14 February 2025.

In January 2025, Canada’s Syndicado acquired the international sales rights of the film.

== Accolades ==
Award	Date	Category	Recipient	Result	Ref.
Berlin International Film Festival	23 February 2025	Teddy Award for Best Short Films	Sirens Call	Nominated	
