= The Leap (film) =

2025 Spanish documentary film

- Festival release poster
- Spanish: El paso
- German: Der Schritt
- Directed by: Roberto Tarazona
- Produced by: Ángel Luis Medina; EICTV Cuba
- Starring: Fabián Olmo Águila; Christian Águila Almeida; Luisa Gálvez Capot; José A. Olmos Chaviano
- Cinematography: Roberto Tarazona
- Edited by: Roberto Tarazona
- Production company: EICTV Cuba
- Distributed by: EICTV Cuba
- Release date: 19 February 2025 (Berlinale)
- Running time: 15 minutes
- Country: Cuba
- Language: Spanish

The Leap (Spanish: El paso) is a Cuban 2025 Spanish-language short documentary film written and directed by Roberto Tarazona. The film follows two children who set out to decipher the mystery of events that the adults talk about only in secret: in the darkness of the moonless nights, cattle are disappearing along with the farmers who dare to confront the “monster” that is taking them.

The film was selected in the Generation Kplus section at the 75th Berlin International Film Festival, where it had its world premiere on February 19 and competed for the Grand Prize for Best Film.

== Summary ==
In rural Cuba, young Fabián and Christian spend their days carefree, unaware of the adults' fears of a lurking menace. Eavesdropping, they learn of vanished livestock and slain farmers. Drawn into a mysterious nighttime adventure, they set off with lanterns and wooden swords. Their playful quest soon turns grim as they confront a haunting ritual that blurs the boundaries between innocence and maturity, life and death.

== Cast ==
- Fabián Olmo Águila,
- Christian Águila Almeida,
- Luisa Gálvez Capot
- José A. Olmos Chaviano

== Release ==
The Leap had its world premiere on 19 February 2025, as part of the 75th Berlin International Film Festival, in Generation Kplus.

== Accolades ==
Award	Date	Category	Recipient	Result	Ref.
Berlin International Film Festival	23 February 2025	Grand Prize for Best Film	The Leap	Nominated	
