= Playtime (2025 film) =

2025 Brazilian documentary film

- Promotional poster
- Portuguese: Hora do recreio
- Directed by: Lúcia Murat
- Written by: Lucia Murat
- Produced by: Lucia Murat; Julio Levy
- Starring: Brenda Viveiros; Luciana Bezerra; Leandra Miranda
- Cinematography: Bacco Andrade
- Edited by: Mair Tavares; Marih Oliveira
- Music by: Bernardo Uzeda
- Production company: Taiga Filmes
- Distributed by: Imovision
- Release date: 15 February 2025 (Berlinale)
- Running time: 83 minutes
- Country: Brazil
- Language: Portuguese

Playtime (Portuguese: Hora do recreio) is a 2025 Brazilian documentary film directed by Lúcia Murat. The film addresses topics such as violence, racism and drug dealing in Brazilian schools from the perspective of students aged 14 to 19. Combining a documentary with a fictional approach.

The film was selected in the Generation 14plus section at the 75th Berlin International Film Festival, where it had its world premiere on 15 February 2025.

== Summary ==
Playtime is a documentary that examines Brazilian education through the perspectives of students aged 14 to 19 from four Rio de Janeiro schools. Blending documentary and fictional elements, it explores issues like school dropout, racism, drug trafficking, stray bullets, femicide, and teenage pregnancy, based on insights from public school teachers.

== Cast ==
- Brenda Viveiros as Clara dos Anges
- Luciana Bezerra as Teacher
- Leandra Miranda as Teacher

== Production ==
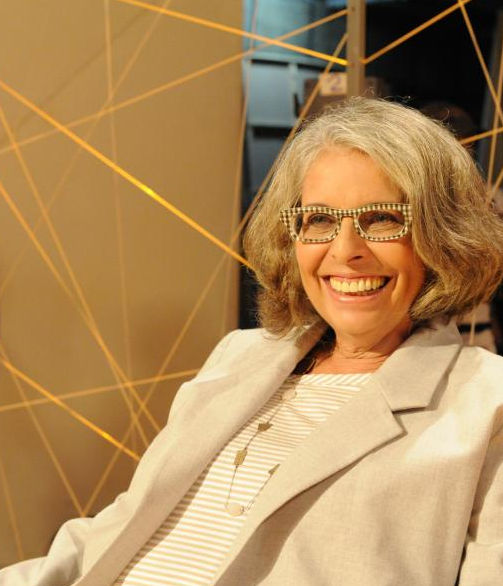
Lúcia Murat director of the film in 2014

The film is written directed and co-produced by Lúcia Murat, and the production company is Taiga Filmes.

== Release ==
Playtime had its World premiere on 15 February 2025, as part of the 75th Berlin International Film Festival, in Generation 14plus.

== Accolades ==
Award	Date	Category	Recipient	Result	Ref.
Berlin International Film Festival	23 February 2025	Crystal Bear for the Best Film Special Mention	Lucia Murat	Special Mention	
Berlin International Film Festival	23 February 2025	Berlinale Documentary Film Award	Lucia Murat	Nominated	
