= Satanic Sow =

- German: Satanische Sau
- Directed by: Rosa von Praunheim
- Written by: Rosa von Praunheim
- Starring: Armin Dallapiccola
- Cinematography: Lorenz Haarmann; Yann Elias Redlitz
- Edited by: Mike Shepard; Rosa von Praunheim
- Music by: Andreas M. Wolter
- Production company: Rosa von Praunheim Produktion
- Distributed by: Missingfilm
- Release date: 15 February 2025 (Berlinale)
- Running time: 85 minutes
- Country: Germany
- Language: German

Satanic Sow (German: Satanische Sau) is a German docufiction film, directed by Rosa von Praunheim and released in 2025. The last film completed and released by von Praunheim before his death, the film is a hybrid of documentary and narrative comedy that stars actor Armin Dallapiccola as von Praunheim in an autobiographical recounting of von Praunheim's own life.

The film premiered in the Panorama Dokumente program at the 75th Berlin International Film Festival, and was named the winner of the Teddy Award for best LGBTQ-related documentary film in the festival.
