= Sandbag Dam =

2025 Croatian film

- Festival release poster
- Croatian: Zečji nasip
- Directed by: Čejen Černić Čanak
- Written by: Tomislav Zajec
- Produced by: Ankica Jurić Tilić; Dragan Jurić; Hrvoje Pervan
- Starring: Lav Novosel; Andrija Žunac; Leon Grgić; Franka Mikolaci; Tanja Smoje
- Cinematography: Marko Brdar
- Edited by: Slaven Zečević
- Music by: Domas Strupinskas
- Production companies: Kinorama; Tremora; Perfo Production
- Distributed by: Duplicato Media; The Open Reel
- Release date: 16 February 2025 (Berlinale)
- Running time: 88 minutes
- Countries: Croatia; Slovenia; Lithuania
- Language: Croatian

Sandbag Dam (Croatian: Zečji nasip) is a 2025 drama film directed by Čejen Černić Čanak. The film follows Marko and Slaven living in a small Croatian village as they reunite and rekindle their love. A co-production of Croatia, Slovenia and Lithuania, the film was selected in the Generation 14plus section at the 75th Berlin International Film Festival, where it had its world premiere on 16 February 2025.

It is also selected for 39th Teddy Award, and will compete for Best Feature Film.

== Synopsis ==
Set in a village endangered by rising rivers, this story of the film follows Slaven as he returns home for his father's funeral. He rekindles a relationship with his childhood friend, Marko, a young athlete who was his teenage love and the reason his father expelled him from home. As they contemplate reuniting, they must confront their past choices and navigate family constraints.

== Cast ==
- Lav Novosel as Marko
- Andrija Žunac as Slaven
- Leon Grgić as Fico
- Franka Mikolaci as Petra
- Tanja Smoje as Vanca
- Alma Prica
- Filip Šovagović

== Production ==
Sandbag Dam directed by Čejen Černić Čanak and written by Tomislav Zajec has Marko Brdar as cinematographer and Domas Strupinskas as composer. It is produced by Ankica Jurić Tilić in association with Kinorama in Croatia, Perfo Production in Slovenia and Tremora in Lithuania. The film was funded by Lithuanian Film Centre - international minority co-productions.

== Release ==
Sandbag Dam had its World premiere on 16 February 2025, as part of the 75th Berlin International Film Festival, in Generation 14plus.

In December 2024, The Open Reel acquired the international sales rights of the film.

== Accolades ==
Award	Date	Category	Recipient	Result	Ref.
Berlin International Film Festival	23 February 2025	Crystal Bear for the Best Film	Čejen Černić Čanak	Nominated	
Berlin International Film Festival	23 February 2025	Teddy Award for Best Feature Films	Čejen Černić Čanak	Nominated	
