= Circusboy =

2025 German documentary film

- Festival release poster
- German: Zirkuskind
- Directed by: Julia Lemke; Anna Koch
- Written by: Julia Lemke Anna Koch
- Produced by: Katharina Bergfeld
- Starring: Santino Frank; Giordano Frank; Ehe Frank
- Cinematography: Julia Lemke
- Edited by: Jamin Benazzouz, BFS
- Music by: Nils Kacirek; Jörg Hochapfel
- Animation by: Magda Kreps; Lea Majeran
- Production companies: Flare Film production; Hessischer Rundfunk; Mitteldeutscher Rundfunk
- Distributed by: Across Nations Filmverleih
- Release date: 15 February 2025 (Berlinale)
- Running time: 86 minutes
- Country: Germany
- Language: German

Circusboy (German: Zirkuskind) is a 2025 documentary road film with animations for children, written and directed by Julia Lemke and Anna Koch. The film follows Santino, a circus kid. He travels round the country with his family and animals, and is here today, there tomorrow.

The film was selected in the Generation Kplus section at the 75th Berlin International Film Festival, where it had its World premiere on 15 February and competed for Crystal Bear for Best Film.

== Summary ==
Santino grows up in a traveling circus, where home is his family rather than a place. His great-grandfather Ehe, a legendary German circus director, shares stories of his career, instilling in Santino a love for the nomadic life. On his 11th birthday, Ehe challenges him to find his talent and contribute to their community. The film is a documentary road movie exploring Germany's last circus families, their unique lifestyle, and the power of belonging.

== Cast ==
- Santino Frank
- Giordano Frank
- Ehe Frank

== Production ==
The film directed by Julia Lemke and Anna Koch, with the animations created by Magda Kreps and Lea Majeran. The film was shot with the Frank family and the Circus Arena team.

The film is the first documentary film to be made as part of the initiative "The Special Children's Film". Principal photography began in June 2023 in Hesse, Thuringia, Saxony-Anhalt and Brandenburg.

== Release ==
Circusboy had its World premiere on 15 February 2025, as part of the 75th Berlin International Film Festival, in Generation Kplus.

== Accolades ==
Award	Date	Category	Recipient	Result	Ref.
Berlin International Film Festival	23 February 2025	Crystal Bear for Best Film	Circusboy	Nominated	
Berlin International Film Festival	23 February 2025	Special Mention	Circusboy	Won	
