= Punching the World =

2025 German film

- Festival release poster
- German: Mit der Faust in die Welt schlagen
- Directed by: Constanze Klaue
- Screenplay by: Constanze Klaue
- Story by: Lukas Rietzschel
- Based on: Mit der Faust in die Welt schlagen by Lukas Rietzschel
- Produced by: Alexander Wadouh, Gabriele Simon, Martin Heisler, Roxana Richters
- Starring: Anton Franke; Camille Moltzen; Anja Schneider; Christian Näthe; Johannes Scheidweiler
- Cinematography: Florian Brückner
- Edited by: Emma Gräf; Andreas Wodraschke
- Music by: PC Nackt
- Production companies: Flare Film; Chromosom Film
- Distributed by: Across Nations
- Release dates: 16 February 2025 (Berlinale); 3 April 2025 (Theaters)
- Running time: 110 minutes
- Country: Germany
- Language: German

Punching the World (German: Mit der Faust in die Welt schlagen) is a 2025 German drama film directed by Constanze Klaue in her directorial debut. The film based on the novel of the same name by Lukas Rietzschel, follows The childhood of two brothers, Philipp and Tobi, growing up in the East German provinces is scarred by the disintegration of their family.

It was selected in Perspectives at the 75th Berlin International Film Festival and was screened on 16 February 2025.

== Synopsis ==
Philipp and Tobias experience their formative years in the expansive yet opportunity-scarce province of Saxony. As time passes, their town faces the challenge of accommodating refugees, leading to a volatile situation. In response, one brother becomes reclusive, while the other channels his anger outward—eventually finding a means to express it.

== Cast ==
- Anton Franke as Philipp Zschornack
- Sammy Scheuritzel as Philipp (older)
- Camille Moltzen as Tobias Zschornack
- Tilman Döbler as Tobias (older)
- Anja Schneider as Sabine, mother
- Christian Näthe as Stefan, father
- Johannes Scheidweiler as Menzel
- Hilmar Eichhorn as grandpa
- Swetlana Schönfeld as grandma
- Jannis Veihelmann as Timo
- Marleen Lau as Elisabeth (younger)
- Charlotte Kaiser Hannes Wegener as Elisabeth
- Lorenzo Germeno as Frame
- Peter Moltzen as Marco's father
- By the Geiger as Kate
- Alexander Hörbe as Chief
- Beate Christiane Furcht as Policewoman

== Production ==
The film directed by Constanze Klaue has screenplay written by herself based on novel of the same name by Lukas Rietzschel. Produced by Flare Film with Chromosom Film, it is funded by MDM (Mitteldeutsche Medienförderung), MBB, BKM (Federal Ministry of Culture and Media) and DFFF (German Film Fund).

Principal photography began at the end of February 2023 in Görlitz, Upper Lusatia for one month. The filming ended on 15 June 2023 in Umgebung Berlin, Upper Lusatia, Görlitz, Hoyerswerda, Brandenburg, and Saxony.

== Release ==
Punching the World had its world premiere on 16 February 2025, as part of the 75th Berlin International Film Festival, in Perspectives.

The film had its theatrical released in Germany on 3 April 2025 by Across Nations.

== Accolades ==
The film selected in the newly formed Perspectives competition will compete for Best First Feature Award.

Award	Date of ceremony	Category	Recipient	Result	Ref.
Berlin International Film Festival	23 February 2025	GWFF Best First Feature Award	Punching the World	Nominated	
