= What Marielle Knows =

2025 German drama film

- Teaser poster
- German: Was Marielle weiß
- Directed by: Frédéric Hambalek
- Screenplay by: Frédéric Hambalek
- Produced by: Philipp Worm; Tobias Walker
- Starring: Julia Jentsch; Felix Kramer; Laeni Geiseler; Mehmet Ateşçi; Moritz Treuenfels
- Cinematography: Alexander Griesser
- Edited by: Anne Fabini
- Production companies: Walker + Worm Film; ZDF/Das Kleine Fernsehspiel
- Distributed by: DCM Film Distribution; Lucky Number
- Release dates: 17 February 2025 (Berlinale); 17 April 2025 (Germany)
- Country: Germany
- Language: German

What Marielle Knows (German: Was Marielle weiß) is a 2025 German drama film written and directed by Frédéric Hambalek. The film follows Julia and Tobias, who discover that their daughter Marielle has suddenly developed telepathic abilities and can see and hear everything they do.

The film was selected in the Competition at the 75th Berlin International Film Festival, where it competed for the Golden Bear and had first screening on 17 February 2025 at Berlinale Palast.

== Synopsis ==
Marielle, Julia and Tobias's 12-year-old daughter, develops telepathic powers, exposing her to her parents' private lives. She learns unsettling truths about her mother’s attraction to a colleague and her father’s lack of confidence, shattering her idealized view of them. The parents struggle with her invasive awareness, altering their behavior and causing complications in both their personal and professional lives.

== Cast ==
- Julia Jentsch as Julia
- Felix Kramer as Tobias
- Laeni Geiseler as Marielle
- Mehmet Ateşçi
- Moritz Treuenfels as Dr. Sören Marx

== Production ==
Principal photography began on 27 February 2024 at locations in Eching, Landshut, Munich and vicinity. Filming ended on 25 March 2024 in locations in Bavaria, Germany.

The film was produced by Walker + Worm Film GmbH & Co. KG, Zweites Deutsches Fernsehen (ZDF) with the backing of German Federal Film Board (FFA) + German Federal Film Fund (DFFF) and distributed by Farbfilm Verleih GmbH.

== Release ==
What Marielle Knows had its world premiere on 17 February 2025, as part of the 75th Berlin International Film Festival, in Competition.

It also competed in New Directors Competition at the São Paulo International Film Festival and had screening on 16 October 2025.

It was screened in the Comedy section of the 61st Chicago International Film Festival on 16 October 2025, and in 'Strands: Laugh' section of the 2025 BFI London Film Festival on 18 October 2025.

It was screened in Open Horizons at the Thessaloniki International Film Festival on 2 November 2025, and in the Open Zone section of the 2025 Stockholm International Film Festival on 6 November 2025. It competed in Golden Olive tree Competition at the Lecce European Film Festival on 17 November 2025.

The film will be presented in the Country Focus section of the 37th Palm Springs International Film Festival and have its California Premiere on 2 January 2026.

The film has joined inaugural slate of newly-launched Paris-based sales company Lucky Number. They acquired sales rights of the film in January 2025.

It was released theatrically in Germany on 17 April 2025 by DCM Film Distribution.

== Accolades ==
The film was shortlisted for nomination to 2026 European Film Awards in feature film category. The award ceremony to announce nominations will take place on 17 January 2026.

Award	Date of ceremony	Category	Recipient	Result	Ref.
Berlin International Film Festival	23 February 2025	Golden Bear	What Marielle Knows	Nominated	
Berlin International Film Festival	23 February 2025	Prize of the Guild of German Arthouse cinemas Special Mention	What Marielle Knows	Special Mention	
Lecce European Film Festival	23 November 2025	Best Screenplay	Frédéric Hambalek	Won	
Lecce European Film Festival	23 November 2025	Critics’ Award – SNCCI	Frédéric Hambalek	Won	
