= The Light (2025 film) =

2025 film directed by Tom Tykwer

- Festival premiere poster
- German: Das Licht
- Directed by: Tom Tykwer
- Screenplay by: Tom Tykwer
- Produced by: Uwe Schott
- Starring: Lars Eidinger; Nicolette Krebitz; Elke Biesendorfer; Julius Gause; Elyas Eldridge; Tala Al Deen; Şiir Eloğlu
- Cinematography: Christian Almesberger
- Edited by: Jasper Brandt
- Music by: Johnny Klimek
- Production companies: X Filme Creative Pool; ZDF; ARP Sélection; Gretchenfilm; B.A. Produktion GmbH, Gold Rush Pictures (UK)
- Distributed by: X Verleih AG (through Warner Bros.)
- Release dates: 13 February 2025 (Berlinale); 20 March 2025 (Germany)
- Running time: 162 minutes
- Countries: Germany; France
- Language: German

The Light (German: Das Licht) is a 2025 drama film written and directed by Tom Tykwer and starring Lars Eidinger and Nicolette Krebitz. The film depicts the everyday life of a middle-class family in a world that has become unstable. The German-French co-production also have Elke Biesendorfer, Julius Gause and Elyas Eldridge in pivotal roles. The film premiered at the 75th Berlin International Film Festival in Special Gala section on 13 February 2025. It was released on 20 March 2025 in German theatres by X Verleih.

== Synopsis ==
Tim and Milena share a household with their twins, Frieda and Jon, along with Milena's son, Dio. Living under one roof, the family exists more as individuals than as a family, bound by little more than circumstance. Their fragile life is disrupted when Farrah, a mysterious housekeeper from Syria, enters their lives. Her presence challenges the Engels in unexpected ways, uncovering long-buried emotions and hidden truths. However, Farrah has her own secret agenda, one that promises to reshape the family's existence forever.

== Cast ==
- Lars Eidinger as Tim Engels
- Nicolette Krebitz as Milena Engels
- Elke Biesendorfer as Frieda Engels
- Julius Gause as Jon Engels
- Elyas Eldridge as Dio
- Tala Al Deen as Farrah
- Max Kruk as Jan Wozniak
- Daniel Grave as Josef
- Ruby M. Lichtenberg as Zazie
- Anna Shirin Habedank as Elsa
- Şiir Eloğlu as Doctor Scholl

== Production ==
Principal photography began on 25 September 2023 on locations in Berlin, Cologne, and Nairobi. Filming ended on 16 December 2023 with filming locations in the regions of Germany as Berlin, North Rhine-Westphalia, and Kenya.

== Release ==
The Light had its world premiere on 13 February 2025, as part of the 75th Berlin International Film Festival, in Special Gala as opening film. In cooperation with X Verleih, the film was transmitted in seven cities across Germany on the occasion of the 75th anniversary of the festival.

It was released theatrically on 20 March 2025 in Germany by X Verleih and distributed by Warner Bros. The world distribution of the film is handled by Beta Film.

== Reception ==
On the review aggregator website Rotten Tomatoes, 14% of 14 critics' reviews are positive, with an average rating of 4.1/10.
