= Canone effimero =

2025 documentary film

Canone effimero is a 2025 documentary film by Gianluca and Massimiliano De Serio which explores eleven musical traditions across Italy.
