= The Moelln Letters =

2025 documentary film by Martina Priessner

- Festival release poster
- German: Die Möllner Briefe
- Directed by: Martina Priessner
- Written by: Martina Priessner
- Produced by: Friedemann Hottenbacher; Gregor Streiber
- Starring: Havva Arslan; Ibrahim Arslan; Namik Arslan; Yeliz Burhan
- Cinematography: Ayşe Alacakaptan; Julia Geiss; Ute Freund; Anne Misselwitz
- Edited by: Maja Tennstedt
- Music by: Derya Yıldırım
- Production companies: inselfilm produktion
- Distributed by: RFF - Real Fiction Filmverleih; New Docs
- Release date: 14 February 2025 (Berlinale)
- Running time: 96 minutes
- Country: Germany
- Languages: German; Turkish

The Moelln Letters (German: Die Möllner Briefe) is a 2025 documentary film written and directed by Martina Priessner. The film follows İbrahim Arslan and his family in their struggle to foster a new, victim-centred culture of remembrance as thirty years after the racist attacks in Mölln, survivors discovers hundreds of forgotten letters of solidarity.

The film was showcased as part of the Panorama at the 75th Berlin International Film Festival on 14 February 2025, where it won Panorama Audience Award for best Documentary.

== Background ==
In November 1992, a racist arson attack in Mölln, Germany, claimed the lives of İbrahim Arslan’s sister, cousin, and grandmother. At seven, İbrahim survived but endured lasting trauma. Decades later, forgotten letters of support resurface, prompting his journey of rediscovery. This film explores the enduring impact on İbrahim and his siblings, highlighting his fight against racism and for victim-centered remembrance. Through reconnecting with letter writers, it uncovers unseen solidarity and advocates for a remembrance culture that amplifies survivors' voices.

=== Content ===
Survivor İbrahim Arslan discovers long-forgotten solidarity letters from a racially motivated attack in Mölln. The film follows his quest to find the writers, uncover the letters' disappearance, and examine Germany's remembrance culture.

== Cast ==
- Havva Arslan
- Ibrahim Arslan
- Namik Arslan
- Yeliz Burhan

== Production ==
The Moelln Letters written and directed by Martina Priessner is produced by G inselfilm produktion with the support of BKM and Medienboard Berlin-Brandenburg. The international sales are handled by New Docs.

Principal photography began on 30 May 2023 at location in Berlin, and North Germany. Filming ended on 30 November 2023 in locations in North Germany.

== Release ==
The Moelln Letters had its World premiere in the Panorama section of the 75th Berlin International Film Festival on 14 February 2025.

The film had its International premiere at the Thessaloniki Documentary Festival in March 2025 in the Open Horizons section.

The German theatrical release is scheduled for early autumn 2025 by Real Fiction.

== Accolades ==
Award	Date	Category	Recipient	Result	Ref.
Berlin International Film Festival	23 February 2025	Panorama Audience Award for Best Documentary Film	Martina Priessner	Won	
Berlin International Film Festival	23 February 2025	Amnesty International Film Award	The Moelln Letters	Won	
