= Short Film Golden Bear =

Golden Bear for the Best Short Film
- Goldener Bär (German)
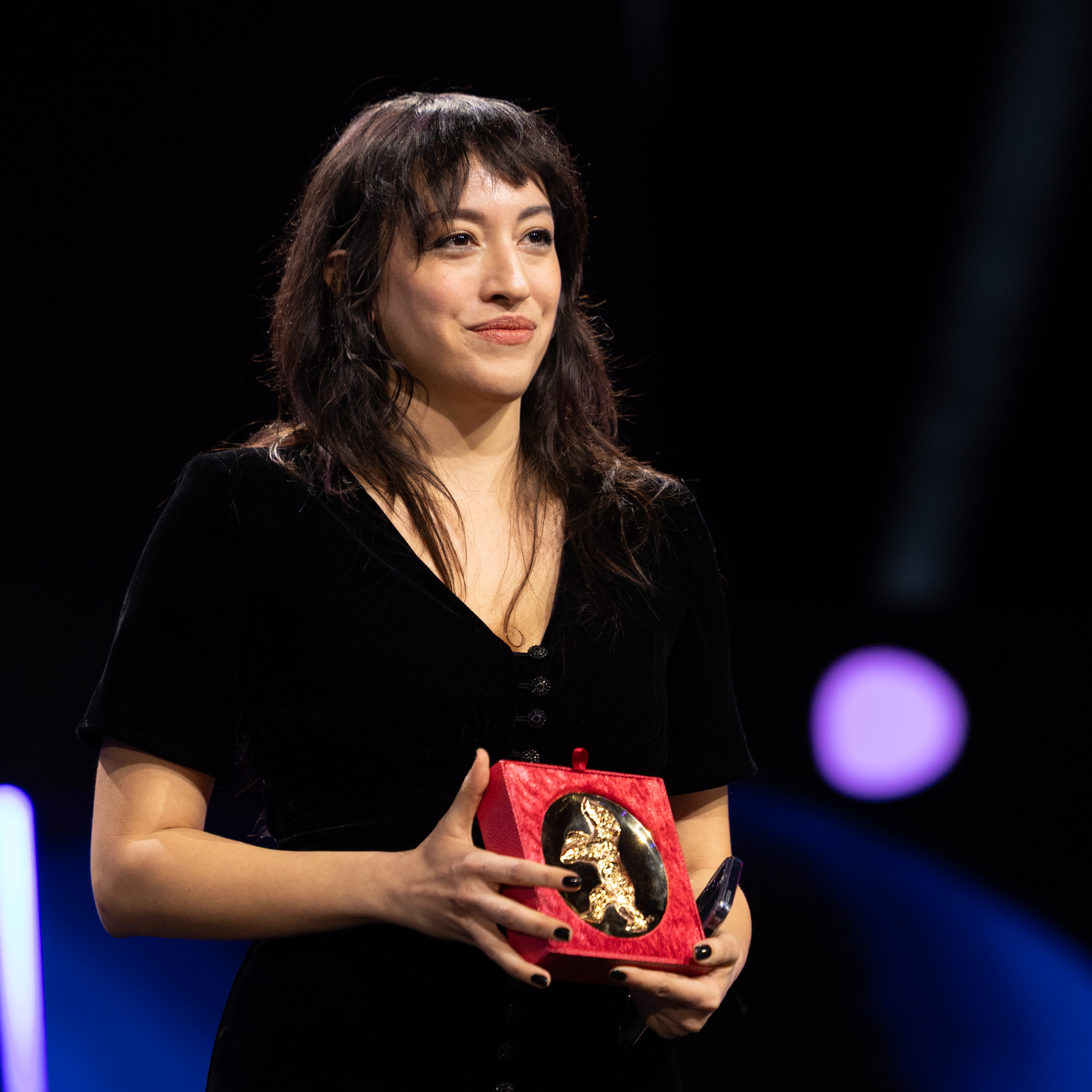
- 2026 recipient: Marie-Rose Osta
- Location: Berlin
- Country: Germany
- Presented by: Berlin International Film Festival
- First award: 1956
- Winner: Someday a Child by Marie-Rose Osta
- Website: www.berlinale.de

The Golden Bear for the Best Short Film (German: Goldener Bär für den Besten Kurzfilm) is the top prize for the short film competition of the Berlin International Film Festival.

== Winners ==
=== 1950s ===
Year	English title	Original title	Director(s)	Production country
1956	Paris at Night	Paris la nuit	Jacques Baratier & Jean Valère	France
1957	Distant People	Gente lontana	Lionetto Fabbri	Italy
1958	La lunga raccolta		Lionetto Fabbri	Italy
1959	Praise the Sea	Prijs de zee	Herman van der Horst	Netherlands

=== 1960s ===
Year	English title	Original title	Director(s)	Production country
1960	Dream of the Wild Horses	Le songe des chevaux sauvages	Denys Colomb de Daunant	France
1961	Gesicht von der Stange?		Raimund Ruehl	West Germany
1962	The Reality of Karel Appel	De werkelijkheid van Karel Appel	Jan Vrijman	Netherlands
1963	Bowspelement		Charles Huguenot van der Linden	Netherlands
1964	Kirdi		Max Lersch	Austria
1965	Yeats Country		Patrick Carey	Ireland, United Kingdom
1966	Knud		Jørgen Roos	Denmark
1967	Through the Eyes of a Painter		M. F. Husain	India
1968	Portrait: Orson Welles		François Reichenbach & Frédéric Rossif	France
1969	To See or Not to See	Psychocratie	Bretislav Pojar	Canada

=== 1970s ===
Year	English title	Original title	Director(s)	Production country
1971	1501 ½		Paul B. Price	United States
1972	Flyaway		Robin Lehman	United Kingdom
1973	Colter's Hell		Robin Lehman	United Kingdom
1974	The Concert		Claude Chagrin	United Kingdom
1975	See		Robin Lehman	United Kingdom
1976	Horu - munakata shiko no sekai		Takeo Yanagawa	Japan
1977	Ortsfremd... wohnhaft vormals Mainzerlandstraße		Hedda Rinneberg and Hans Sachs	West Germany
1978	Co jsme udelali slepicím		Vladimír Jiránek and Josef Hekrdle	Czechoslovakia
1979	Ubu		Geoff Dunbar	United Kingdom

=== 1980s ===
Year	English title	Original title	Director(s)	Production country
1980	The Heads	Hlavy	Petr Sís	Czechoslovakia
1981	History of the World in Three Minutes Flat		Michael Mills	Canada
1982	The Puppet, A Friend of Man	Loutka, přítel člověka	Ivan Renč	Czechoslovakia
1983	Dimensions of Dialogue	Možnosti dialogu	Jan Švankmajer	Czechoslovakia
1984	The Bicycle Symphony	Cykelsymfonien	Åke Sandgren	Denmark, Sweden
1985	From the Reports of Security Guards & Patrol Services Part 1	Nr. 1 - Aus Berichten der Wach- und Patrouillendienste	Helke Sander	West Germany
1986	Tom Goes to the Bar		Dean Parisot	United States
1987	Curriculum vitae		Pavel Koutský	Czechoslovakia
1988	Oblast		Zdravko Barišić	Yugoslavia
1989	Pas à deux		Monique Renault and Gerrit van Dijk	Netherlands

=== 1990s ===
Year	English title	Original title	Director(s)	Production country
1990	Mister Tao		Bruno Bozzetto	Italy
1991	Six Point Nine		Dan Bootzin	United States
1993	Bolero		Ivan Maximov	Russia
1994	Ashes	Hamu	Ferenc Cakó	Hungary
1995	Repeat	Repete	Michaela Pavlátová	Czech Republic
1996	The Arrival of the Train	Pribitie poezda	Andrei Zhelezniakov	Russia
1997	The Latest News	Senaste Nytt	Per Carleson	Sweden
1998	I Move, So I Am	Ik beweeg, dus ik besta	Gerrit van Dijk	Netherlands
1999	Faraon		Sergei Ovcharov	Russia
1999	Masks	Maski	Piotr Karwas	Germany

=== 2000s ===
Year	English title	Original title	Director(s)	Production country	Ref
2000	Tribute to Alfred Lepetit	Hommage à Alfred Lepetit	Jean Rousselot	France	
2001	Black Soul	Âme noire	Martine Chartrand	Canada	
2002	At Dawning		Martin Jones	United Kingdom	
2003	(A)Torsion	(A)Torzija	Stefan Arsenijević	Slovenia	
2004	Cigarettes and Coffee	Un cartus de kent si un pachet de cafea	Cristi Puiu	Romania	
2005	Milk		Peter Mackie Burns	United Kingdom	
2006	Never Like the First Time!	Aldrig som första gången!	Jonas Odell	Sweden	
2007	Contact	Raak	Hanro Smitsman	Netherlands	
2008	A Good Day for a Swim	O zi buna de plaja	Bogdan Mustață	Romania	
2009	Please Say Something		David O'Reilly	Ireland	

=== 2010s ===
Year	English title	Original title	Director(s)	Production country	Ref
2010	Incident by a Bank	Händelse vid bank	Ruben Östlund	Sweden	
2011	Night Fishing	파란만장	Park Chan-wook and Park Chan-kyong	South Korea	
2012	Rafa		João Salaviza	Portugal	
2013	The Runaway	La fugue	Jean-Bernard Marlin	France	
2014	As Long As Shotguns Remain	Tant qu'il nous reste des fusils à pompe	Caroline Poggi and Jonathan Vinel	France	
2015	Hosanna		Young-kil Na	South Korea	
2016	Batrachian's Ballad	Balada de um Batráquio	Leonor Teles	Portugal	
2017	Small Town	Cidade Pequena	Diogo Costa Amarante	Portugal	
2018	The Men Behind the Wall		Inés Moldavsky	Israel	
2019	Umbra		Florian Fischer & Johannes Krell	Germany	

=== 2020s ===
Year	English title	Original title	Director(s)	Production country	Ref
2020	T		Keisha Rae Witherspoon	United States	
2021	My Uncle Tudor	Nanu Tudor	Olga Lucovnicova	Moldova	
2022	Trap		Anastasia Veber	Russia, Lithuania	
2023	Les Chenilles		Michelle Keserwany and Noel Keserwany	France	
2024	An Odd Turn	Un movimiento extraño	Francisco Lezama	Argentina	
2025	Lloyd Wong, Unfinished		Lesley Loksi Chan	Canada	
2026	Someday a Child	Yawman ma walad	Marie-Rose Osta	France, Romania, Lebanon	

== See also ==
- Silver Bear for Best Short Film
