= Another League =

- Theatrical release poster
- Spanish: Pioneras: solo querían jugar
- Directed by: Marta Díaz de Lope Díaz
- Written by: Zebina Guerra; Marta Díaz de Lope Díaz
- Produced by: Jesús Ulled Nadal; Rodrigo Areias; Kiko Martínez; Francisco Sánchez Ortiz
- Starring: Daniel Ibáñez; Sofía de Iznájar; Bruna Lucadamo; Aixa Villagrán; Elena Irureta; Carmen Ruiz; Albano Jerónimo; Jordi Sánchez
- Cinematography: Maria Codina
- Edited by: Alberto Gutiérrez
- Music by: Pedro Marques
- Production companies: Pioneras la Película AIE; Cine365 Films; Nadie es Perfecto; Ciudadano Ciskul; Bando A Parte
- Distributed by: Filmax
- Release dates: 8 March 2026 (Málaga); 5 June 2026 (Spain)
- Running time: 106 minutes
- Countries: Spain; Portugal
- Language: Spanish

Another League (Spanish: Pioneras: solo querían jugar, lit. 'pioneers: they just wanted to play') is a 2026 comedy-drama film directed by Marta Díaz de Lope Díaz. Starring Daniel Ibáñez, Sofía de Iznájar, Bruna Lucadamo, Aixa Villagrán, and Elena Irureta, the plot explores women's football in 1970s Spain. It is a Spanish-Portuguese co-production.

The film premiered at the 29th Málaga Film Festival in March 2026 ahead of its 5 June 2026 theatrical release in Spain by Filmax.

== Plot ==
Starting in 1970, the plot follows a group of girls and a young coach as the girls break down barriers in a deeply sexist society and take the baby steps of women's football in Spain.

== Cast ==
- Sofía de Iznájar as Nati
- Bruna Lucadamo as Belén
- Nora Otxoteko as María
- Leire Aguiar as Ana
- Lorea Carballo as Ángeles
- Miriam Rubio as Pepa
- Alejandro Casaseca as Ignacio
- Daniel Ibáñez as Javier Poga (Note: Inspired on the real-life Rafael Muga.)
- Aixa Villagrán as Edelmira (Note: Directly inspired on the real-life journalist Mari Carmen Izquierdo, aka 'Maratón'.)
- Elena Irureta as Alicia Laso
- Carmen Ruiz as Matilde
- Carmen Flores as Rosa
- Pepa Aniorte as Reme
- José Troncoso as Manolo

== Production ==
An homage to the pioneers of women's football in Spain and to Rafael Muga, Another League was written by Marta Díaz de Lope Díaz and Zebina Guerra. The film is a Spanish-Portuguese co-production by Pioneras la Película AIE, Cine365 Films, Nadie es Perfecto, Ciudadano Ciskul, and Bando A Parte, with financial backing from RTVE, Movistar Plus+, ICAA and CreaSGR. The documentation phase was carried out with the involvement of Victoria Hernández, Isabel Fuentes, Conchi Sánchez, and Rafael Muga. Maria Codina worked as director of photography, using Alexa 35 cameras and Tribe anamorphic Blackwing lenses. In April 2025, Pioneras was reported to have wrapped in Madrid after six weeks and a half of filming. In addition to the streets of Villaverde, shooting locations also included Tenerife and Guadalajara.

== Release ==
Cast and crew members attending the 2026 Málaga Film Festival

The film was presented in the official selection of the 29th Málaga Film Festival on 8 March 2026. For its international premiere, it made it to the Ibero-American slate of the 41st Guadalajara International Film Festival as well as in the lineup of films qualifying for the Maguey Award dedicated to works tackling sexual diversity and the LGBTQ+ community. Distributed by Filmax, the film was released theatrically in Spain on 5 June 2026.

Wayna Pitch scheduled a rollout in French theatres for 11 November 2026 on the same day as the film presentation at the 27th Arras Film Festival.

== Reception ==
Juan Pando of Fotogramas rated the film 4 out of 5 stars, pointing out that it tackles thorny issues with a sensitivity reminiscent of British social-issue films such as Full Monty, Brassed Off, or Pride.

Javier Ocaña of El País considered the film "a beautiful blend of social drama, biting comedy, and luminous melodrama".

Manuel J. Lombardo of Diario de Sevilla gave the film a 2-star rating, assessing that the story is drawn straight "from the handbook of feminist and libertarian best practices, [fit] for times that demand little complexity and even less depth".

Fabien Lemercier of Cineuropa wrote that the film "is told with warmth and close attention to the action on the pitch".

The film won the public perfect award of the queer film festival Everybody's Perfect in Geneva in 2026.

== Accolades ==
Year	Award	Category	Nominee(s)	Result	Ref.
2026	29th Málaga Film Festival	Silver Biznaga, Audience Award		Won	
2026	32nd Forqué Awards	Cinema and Education in Values		Pending	

== See also ==
- List of Spanish films of 2026
