= 29th Málaga Film Festival =

2026 film festival

- Official poster by Pepo Pérez
- Opening film: Calle Málaga
- Closing film: Uncle Trouble +2
- Location: Málaga, Spain
- Awards: Golden Biznaga: I Won't Die for Love and The Garden We Dreamed
- Festival date: 6–15 March 2026

Málaga Film Festival
- 2027 2025

The 29th Málaga Film Festival ran in Málaga, Spain, from 6 to 15 March 2026.

== Background ==
The official poster for the 29th edition (a work by Pepo Pérez) was presented on 10 November 2025. Peruvian filmmaker Francisco J. Lombardi was later announced as the recipient of a 'Retrospective' Award. On 26 January 2026, the festival announced an initial slate of five titles for the main competition section, including Calle Málaga as the opening film. The full official selection slate was published on 11 February 2026. The opening gala was hosted by Kira Miró and featured the musical performances of Sanguijuelas del Guadiana and Las Migas. Actress Rossy de Palma received the Málaga-Sur award on 7 March 2026 in a gala hosted by Mabel Lozano, while the out-of-competition screening of Ladies' Hunting Party was also programmed. Hosted by Elena Sánchez and Masi Rodríguez, the closing gala featured the musical performances of Viva Suecia, Pasión Vega and performances of Benidorm Fest 2026 winners Tony Grox & Lucycalys.

== Juries ==
The juries include:

=== Official selection ===
- Jaione Camborda (President), director and screenwriter
- Daniela Michel, director of the Morelia International Film Festival
- Santiago Roncagliolo, writer and screenwriter
- Loreto Mauleón, actress
- Belén Funes, director
- Gastón Pauls, director and actor
- Rosa Montero, writer

=== Zonazine ===
- Àlex Monner, actor
- Paula Palacios, director
- Nicolás Gil Lavedra, filmmaker

== Festival slate ==
=== Official Selection ===
==== In competition ====
Highlighted title indicates section's best film winners.

English title	Original title	Director(s)	Production countrie(s) (Note: As reported in the festival's webpage)
Ángeles		Paula Markovitch	Mexico; Argentina
Another League	Pioneras. Solo querían jugar	Marta Díaz de Lope Díaz	Spain; Portugal
Bad Beast	Mala bèstia	Bárbara Farré	Spain
Better Class	Altas capacidades	Víctor García León	Spain; Uruguay
Blue Lights of Benidorm	Después de Kim	Ángeles González-Sinde	Spain
Calle Málaga		Maryam Touzani	Morocco; Spain; France; Belgium; Germany
Heart of the Wolf	El corazón del lobo	Francisco J. Lombardi	Peru
The Good Daughter	La buena hija	Júlia de Paz	Spain
El guardián		Nuria Ibáñez	Mexico; Spain
The Red Hangar	Hangar rojo	Juan Pablo Sallato	Chile; Argentina; Italy
The Condor Daughter	La hija Cóndor	Álvaro Olmos Torrico	Bolivia; Peru; Uruguay
I Won't Die for Love	Yo no moriré de amor	Marta Matute	Spain
Iván & Hadoum		Ian de la Rosa	Spain; Germany; Belgium
The Garden We Dreamed	El jardín que soñamos	Joaquín del Paso	Mexico
Juana		Daniel Giménez Cacho	Mexico
Mil pedazos		Sergio Castro-San Martín	Chile; Spain; Argentina
My Dearest Señorita	Mi querida señorita	Fernando González Molina	Spain
Neurótica anónima		Jorge Perugorría Rodríguez	México; Cuba
Pizza Movies		Carlo Padial	Spain
Runner	Corredora	Laura García Alonso	Spain
Welcome to Lapland	Lapönia	David Serrano	Spain
The Woman in the Line	La mujer de la fila	Benjamín Ávila	Argentina

==== Out of competition ====
English title	Original title	Director(s)	Production countrie(s) (Note: As reported in the festival's webpage)
9 Moons	9 lunas	Patricia Ortega	Spain; Belgium
Andy		Román Parrado	Spain
Another Man	Un altre home	David Moragas	Spain; Mexico
Auri		Violeta Salama	Spain
Bye bye paraíso		Kim Elizondo Navarro	Costa Rica; Uruguay; Colombia
La casaca de Dios		Fernán Mirás	Argentina; United States
Cool Books	Casi todo bien	Andrés Salmoyraghi, Rafael López Saubidet	Spain
Dos días		Gonzaga Manso	Spain
Femení, singular		Xavi Puebla	Spain
Flying Colors	Todos los colores	Beatriz de Silva	Spain
Hour and Twenty	Hora y veinte	Marc Romero	Spain
Hugo 24		Luc Knowles	Spain
An Island Away From You	A una isla de ti	Alexis Morante	Spain
Ladies' Hunting Party	Día de caza	Pedro Aguilera	Spain; France
Mallorca Confidential	Mallorca Confidencial	David Ilundain	Spain
The Righteous	Los justos	Jorge A. Lara, Fernando Pérez	Spain
Solos		Guillermo Ríos	Spain
A Son	Un hijo	Nacho la Casa	Spain; Portugal
A Sucker's Born Every Minute	Cada día nace un listo	Arantxa Echevarría	Spain
Uncle Trouble +2	La familia Benetón +2	Joaquín Mazón	Spain; Mexico
North to Paradise	Viatge al país dels blancs	Dani Sancho	Spain; France

==== Series — Out of Competition ====
English title	Original title	Director(s)	Production countrie(s) (Note: As reported in the festival's webpage)
Acoustic Home		Alexis Morante	Spain
Naughty Business	Cochinas	Andrea Jaurrieta, Laura M. Campos, Núria Gago	United States; Spain
Between Lands (S2)	Entre tierras	Humberto Miró, Salvador García Ruiz	Spain
Millennial Mal		Lorena Iglesias, Andrea Jaurrieta	Spain
La nena		Paco Cabezas	Spain
Por cien millones		Nacho G. Velilla	Spain
If It's Tuesday, It's Murder	Si es martes, es asesinato	Salvador Calvo, Abigail Schaaff	Spain

=== Zonazine ===
Highlighted title indicates section's best film winners.

English title	Original title	Director(s)	Production countrie(s)c
Aquella sombra desvanecía		Samuel Urbina	Peru
Quantum Rave	Cuántica Rave	Paco L. Campano	Spain
La Carn		Joan Porcel	Spain
Los nadadores		Sol Iglesias SK	Argentina; Mexico; United States
Oca		Karla Badillo	Mexico
Quase Deserto		José Eduardo Belmonte	Brazil; United States
We Are The Jungle		Gwai Lou David Yáñez	Spain; Malaysia

=== Mosaico: International Panorama ===
English title	Original title	Director(s)	Production countrie(s)
Comandante Fritz		Pavel Giroud	Spain; Germany
The Boy with Pink Pants	Il ragazzo dai pantaloni rosa	Margherita Ferri	Italy
The Tasters	Le assaggiatrici	Silvio Soldini	Italy; Belgium; Switzerland
Guess Who's Calling!	Le répondeur	Fabienne Godet	France
Out of Love	Les enfants vont bien	Nathan Ambrosioni	France
Father	Otec	Tereza Nvotová	Poland; Slovakia
Maigret and the Dead Lover	Maigret et le mort amoureux	Pascal Bonitzer	France
Tradita		Gabriele Altobelli	Italy

=== Special Screenings ===
The films programmed in the Special Screenings (Pases Especiales) slate included:

English title	Original title	Director(s)	Production countrie(s)
Kraken: The Black Book of Hours	Kraken: El libro negro de las horas	Manuel Sanabria, Joaquín Llamas	Spain
La verdadera historia de Ricardo III. La película		Marcelo Piñeyro	Argentina
Secretos de Dublín		Pedro Carrillo	Spain; Ireland
Tríptico elemental de España		José Val del Omar	Spain

== Awards ==
Some of the main awards are listed as follows:

=== Official section feature films ===
==== Official jury prizes ====
- Golden Biznaga for Best Spanish Film: I Won't Die for Love
- Golden Biznaga for Best Latin American Film: The Garden We Dreamed
- Silver Biznaga, Special Jury Prize: Iván & Hadoum
- Silver Biznaga for Best Director: Joaquín del Paso (The Garden We Dreamed)
- Silver Biznaga for Best Actress: Júlia Mascort (I Won't Die for Love)
  - Special Mention: Ángeles Pradal (Ángeles)
- Silver Biznaga for Best Actor: Nicolás Zárate (The Red Hangar)
  - Special Mention: Silver Chicón (Iván & Hadoum)
- Silver Biznaga for Best Supporting Actress: María Magdalena Sanizo (The Condor Daughter)
- Silver Biznaga for Best Supporting Actress: Tomás del Estal (I Won't Die for Love)
- Silver Biznaga for Best Screenplay: Ian de la Rosa (Iván & Hadoum)
- Silver Biznaga for Best Music: Cergio Prudencio, Marcelo Guerrero (The Condor Daughter)
- Silver Biznaga for Best Cinematography: Gökhan Tiryaki (The Garden We Dreamed)
- Silver Biznaga for Best Editing: Valeria Hernándezm Sebastián Brahm (The Red Hangar)

==== Other ====
- Silver Biznaga, Audience Award for Best Film (Competition, voting at theatres): Another League
- Silver Biznaga, El País Audience Award for Best Film (Competition): The Red Hangar
- Silver Biznaga, Critics' Jury Special Prize: The Red Hangar

=== Zonazine ===
The jury formed by Nicolás Gil Lavedra, Àlex Monner, and Paula Palacios granted the following awards:

- Silver Biznaga for Best Spanish Film: La carn
- Silver Biznaga for Best Latin American Film: Oca
- Special Mention: Los nadadores

=== Miscellaneous ===
- Feroz Puerta Oscura Award for Best Film: I Won't Die for Love
- SIGNIS Award: The Woman in the Line
