= Botana =

Botana is a Spanish surname. Notable people with the surname include:

- Adam Botana, American politician
- Antia Botana, Spanish and American physicist
- Ismael Prego Botana, Spanish YouTuber better known as Wismichu
- Natalio Botana (1888–1941), Uraguayan journalist
- Raúl Damonte Botana (1939–1987), Argentine writer better known as Copi
- Uxía Martínez Botana (born 1988), Spanish musician
