= Pizza Movies =

- Theatrical release poster
- Directed by: Carlo Padial
- Screenplay by: Desirée de Fez; Carlos de Diego; Carlo Padial
- Starring: Berto Romero; Judit Martín; Joaquín Reyes; Bruna Cusí; Raúl Arévalo; Tamar Novas; Miguel Noguera; Melina Matthews; Javier Botet; Belén Barenys
- Cinematography: Patricio Vial
- Edited by: Ove Hermida-Carro; Jaume Martí
- Music by: Javier Rodero Villa
- Production companies: El Cansancio; Bambina Films; Scorpora Studio; Pioneros Media Offline
- Distributed by: A Contracorriente Films
- Release dates: 11 March 2026 (Málaga); 15 May 2026 (Spain)
- Running time: 87 minutes
- Country: Spain
- Language: Spanish

Pizza Movies is a 2026 Spanish comedy film directed by Carlo Padial from a screenplay co-written with Desirée de Fez and Carlos de Diego. It stars Berto Romero and Judit Martín.

It premiered on 11 March 2026 at the 29th Málaga Film Festival ahead of its 15 May 2026 theatrical release in Spain by A Contracorriente Films.

== Plot ==
The plot follows a couple (journalist and film critic Thais and publicist Alan) who decides to open a pizza business in the midst of a career crisis.

== Cast ==
- Berto Romero as Alan
- Judit Martín as Thais
- Joaquín Reyes
- Bruna Cusí
- Raúl Arévalo
- Tamar Novas
- Miguel Noguera
- Melina Matthews
- Javier Botet
- Belén Barenys

== Production ==
The screenplay was written by Desirée de Fez, Carlos de Diego, and Carlo Padial. De Fez stated that the film stemmed from "the desire to make a positive, happy, cheerful comedy", finding inspiration in the American comedies of Mel Brooks, Hal Ashby or Albert Brooks from the late 60s, 70s, and 80s. The film was produced by El Cansancio, Bambina, Scorpora, and Pioneros Media Offline.

== Release ==
Pizza Movies was presented at the 29th Málaga Film Festival on 11 March 2026. For its Catalan premiere, it was programmed at the D'A Film Festival. It is scheduled to be released theatrically in Spain on 15 May 2026.

== Reception ==
Víctor A. Gómez of La Opinión de Málaga praised as a merit how Padial manages to tell "important things about who we are and where we stand right now" and "offering a hopeful way forward" "without a trace of cynicism".

Fran González of Mondosonoro rated the film 7 out of 10 points, writing that it inspires with its "remarkable optimism and human warmth in these dark and cynical times".

Writing in El Mundo, Nacho Vigalondo billed the film as "a universal film about the triumph of love over the wear and tear of life in times of economic uncertainty", entailing a brand of "underground cinema to watch with the family".

Jordi Batlle Caminal of La Vanguardia rated the film 4 out of 5 stars, finding strikingly curious (or miraculous) how "despite being the polar opposite of social cinema, Pizza Movies captures the state of the world with crystal-clear precision".

Ricardo Rosado of Fotogramas rated the film 4 out of 5 stars, writing about how it "shields us from cynicism and barbarism by embracing kindness, buffoonery, and melancholy".

Carlos Marañón of Cinemanía rated the film 4 ouf of 5 stars, declaring it "a full-blown romantic comedy about two losers".

== See also ==
- List of Spanish films of 2026
