= Raúl Álvarez =

Raúl Álvarez may refer to:

- AuronPlay (Raúl Álvarez Genes, born 1988), Spanish YouTuber
- Raúl Álvarez (baseball) (1902–?), Cuban baseball player
