= I Won't Die for Love =

- Theatrical release poster
- Spanish: Yo no moriré de amor
- Directed by: Marta Matute
- Screenplay by: Marta Matute
- Produced by: José Esteban Alenda; César Esteban Alenda; María Zamora
- Starring: Júlia Mascort; Sonia Almarcha; Tomás del Estal; Guillermo Benet; Laura Weissmahr
- Cinematography: Sara Gallego
- Edited by: Carlos Cañas Carreira
- Music by: Simon Fransquet
- Production companies: Solita Films; Elastica Films; Saga Film
- Distributed by: Elastica Films
- Release dates: 11 March 2026 (Málaga); 8 May 2026 (Spain)
- Running time: 94 minutes
- Countries: Spain; Belgium
- Language: Spanish

I Won't Die for Love (Spanish: Yo no moriré de amor) is a 2026 family drama film directed by Marta Matute (in her directorial debut feature). It stars newcomer Júlia Mascort along with Sonia Almarcha, Tomás del Estal, and Laura Weissmahr. It is a Spanish-Belgian co-production.

The film world premiered at the 29th Málaga Film Festival on 11 March 2026 and went on to win the Golden Biznaga. It was released theatrically in Spain on 8 May 2026 by Elastica Films.

== Plot ==
The plot explores the dilemma of 18-year-old Claudia, torn between becoming a caregiver for her mother who has Alzheimer's disease or making the most of her youth.

== Cast ==
- Júlia Mascort as Claudia
- Sonia Almarcha
- Tomás del Estal
- Guillermo Benet
- Laura Weissmahr as Inés

== Production ==
The screenplay taps incidents from the biography of director Marta Matute, who also took inspiration from the work of Carla Simón, Belén Funes, and Pilar Palomero. In 2021, while the project was in development, Matute won the 18th 'Julio Alejandro' SGAE Award for Best Feature Length Screenplay. It was picked up by the ECAM incubator program. The film is a Spanish-Belgian co-production by Solita Films (José Esteban Alenda and César Esteban Alenda) and Elastica Films (María Zamora) alongside Saga Film (Flavia Biurrun). It also received backing from ICAA, Eurimages, the Madrid regional administration, Ayuntamiento de Madrid, RTVE, Movistar Plus+, and Filmin. Shooting locations included Valdemoro (Matute's hometown) and Madrid. Sara Gallego worked as director of photography, using an Alexa 35 camera and Kowa Cine Prominar lenses.

== Release ==
The film was presented in the official selection of the 29th Málaga Film Festival on 11 March 2026. It was also programmed at the 16th D'A Film Festival. Distributed by Elastica Films, it was released theatrically in Spain on 8 May 2026.

== Reception ==
Laura Pérez of Fotogramas rated the film 4 out of 5 stars, determining it to possess "a brutal emotional honesty", also writing that it is "crafted with precision", with every move carefully calculated so as not to give any satisfaction until well into the film.

In a 4-star rating, Manuel J. Lombardo of Diario de Sevilla wrote that I Won't Die for Love turns out to be "raw, honest, direct and uncompromising" film.

Javier Ocaña of El País assessed that the "excellent" film delivers a story which is "harrowing yet moving, vicious yet hopeful", although none of its achievements would have been possible without the awe-inspiring performances by Mascort, Almarcha, del Estal, and Weissmahr.

Marta Medina del Valle of El Confidencial rated the film 4 out of 5 stars, adscribing it to the "intimist" trend of recent Spanish cinema in search of the hyperrealist portrait, in which the "superb" performances of the film's four leads are framed.

Alfonso Rivera of Cineuropa praised how Matute manages to convey her message "through a mature, restrained, measured and meticulous direction, where silences, ellipses and glances carry more weight than dialogue".

== Accolades ==
Year	Award	Category	Nominee(s)	Result	Ref.
2026	29th Málaga Film Festival	Golden Biznaga		Won	
2026	29th Málaga Film Festival	Silver Biznaga for Best Actress	Júlia Mascort	Won	
2026	29th Málaga Film Festival	Silver Biznaga for Best Supporting Actor	Tomás del Estal	Won	
2026	29th Málaga Film Festival	Feroz Puerta Oscura Award		Won	
2026	31st Toulouse Spanish Film Festival	Golden Violet		Won	
2026	31st Toulouse Spanish Film Festival	Best Actress	Júlia Mascort	Won	
2026	31st Toulouse Spanish Film Festival	Youth Prize for New Filmmaker	Marta Matute	Won	
2026	32nd Forqué Awards	Best Film		Pending	
2026	32nd Forqué Awards	Cinema and Education in Values		Pending	

== See also ==
- List of Spanish films of 2026
