= Sisters (2026 film) =

- Theatrical release poster
- Spanish: Hermanas
- Directed by: Ione Hernández Sáenz
- Written by: Ione Hernández Sáenz
- Produced by: Lara Izagirre Garizurieta; Garazi Elorza Vadillo; María Zamora; José E. Alenda; César E. Alenda; Úrsula Romero Gerbending; R. Paul Miller
- Starring: Elena Anaya; Emma Suárez; Josean Bengoetxea; Carlota Keiko; León Martínez; Nora Otxoteko; Aritz Kortabarria
- Cinematography: Diego Dussuel
- Edited by: Carlos Cañas; Cristina Laguna
- Music by: Olivier Arson
- Production companies: Noesno film AIE; Solita Films; Gariza Films; Elastica Films; ISB Films
- Distributed by: Elastica
- Release dates: 12 September 2026 (TIFF); 27 November 2026 (Spain)
- Country: Spain
- Language: Spanish

Sisters (Spanish: Hermanas) is a 2026 Spanish drama film written and directed by Ione Hernández. It stars Emma Suárez and Elena Anaya.

It premiered at the 51st Toronto International Film Festival on 12 September 2026 ahead of its 27 November 2026 theatrical release in Spain by Elastica.

== Plot ==
The seemingly unbreakable bond between sisters Chelo and Marta is tested after Marta's 18 year-old son Lucas is accused of sexual abuse of his cousin, underage Sofía.

== Cast ==
- Emma Suárez as Marta
- Elena Anaya as Chelo
- Carlota Keiko
- León Martínez
- Josean Bengoetxea
- Aritz Kortabarria
- Nora Otxoteko

== Production ==
The film was produced by Solita Films, Gariza Films, and Elastica Films alongside ISB Films with backing from ICAA, EiTB, HBO Max, Ayuntamiento de Madrid, and Diputación Foral de Bizkaia. It was shot in Biscay and Madrid. Cinematographer Diego Dussuel used an Arri Alexa 35 camera and Leica Summilux lenses.

== Release ==
Cast and crew members attending the 2026 Seminci

Sisters was presented in the 'Discovery' section of the 51st Toronto International Film Festival in September 2026. For its European premiere, the film will screen in the 'Official Section' of the 71st Valladolid International Film Festival (Seminci) in October 2026. It is scheduled to be released theatrically in Spain by Elastica Films on 27 November 2026. Brussels-based outfit Be For Films acquired international sales rights to the film ahead of its premiere.

== See also ==
- List of Spanish films of 2026
