= Runner (2026 Spanish film) =

- Theatrical release poster
- Catalan: Corredora
- Directed by: Laura García Alonso
- Screenplay by: Laura García Alonso; Pol Cortecans
- Produced by: Miriam Porté; María Zamora; Àngels Masclans
- Starring: Alba Sáez; Marina Salas; Àlex Brendemühl
- Cinematography: Gina Ferrer
- Edited by: Marta Velasco
- Music by: Ylia
- Production companies: Distinto Films; Elastica Films; Dos Soles Media
- Distributed by: Elastica
- Release dates: 8 March 2026 (Málaga); 29 May 2026 (Spain)
- Running time: 95 minutes
- Country: Spain
- Language: Catalan

Runner (Catalan: Corredora) is a 2026 drama film directed by Laura García Alonso (in her debut feature) from a screenplay that she co-wrote with Pol Cortecans. It stars Alba Sáez.

== Plot ==
The plot follows elite runner Cris after she suffers a psychotic break that sets her apart from competition, managing to find understanding in her sister.

== Cast ==
- Alba Sáez as Cris
- Marina Salas as Natàlia
- Àlex Brendemühl

== Production ==
Corredora was produced by Distinto Films alongside Elastica Films and Dos Soles Media, with the participation of 3Cat and RTVE. It was shot in between Zaragoza and various locations across Catalonia. The project won a funding award valued in €10,000 for sound post-production services at the 8th European Work in Progress (EWIP) event in 2025.

== Release ==
Crew and cast members attending the 2026 Málaga Film Festival

Runner was presented at the 29th Málaga Film Festival in March 2026. It was also programmed at the 10th BCN Film Fest and in the 'Made in Spain' slate of the 74th San Sebastián International Film Festival. Elastica secured theatrical distribution in Spain, scheduling a 29 May 2026 release date. Latido Films acquired international sales rights.

== Reception ==
Raquel Hernández Luján of HobbyConsolas gave the film a 70-point score, declaring It a "notable" debut in both direction and writing duties for García Alonso.

Sergi Sánchez of Fotogramas rated the film 4 out of 5 stars, billing it as "perhaps the horror film that the most naturalistic Polanski would have made if he were a fan of athletics".

Philipp Engel of Cinemanía rated the film 3½ out of 5 stars, commending it as "a compelling indictment of the maddening absurdity of the culture of success".

María Adell Carmona of Ara rated the "stimulating" film 3½ out of 5 stars, considering the first 15 minutes involving the protagonist's psychotic episode a model example of tense psychological thriller.

== See also ==
- List of Spanish films of 2026
