= Inside Love (film) =

- Theatrical release poster
- Spanish: Presentimientos
- Directed by: Santiago Tabernero
- Screenplay by: Santiago Tabernero; Eduardo Noriega
- Based on: Presentimientos by Clara Sánchez
- Produced by: Gerardo Herrero
- Starring: Marta Etura; Eduardo Noriega; Alfonso Bassave; Gloria Muñoz; Irene Escolar; Pepa Charro; Jack Taylor
- Cinematography: Pablo Rosso
- Edited by: Mapa Pastor
- Music by: Joan Valent
- Production companies: Tornasol Films; Castafiore Films; Zapping Entertainment
- Distributed by: Syldavia Cinema
- Release dates: 20 October 2013 (Seminci); 24 January 2014 (Spain)
- Country: Spain
- Language: Spanish

Inside Love (Spanish: Presentimientos, lit. 'Presentiments') is a 2013 Spanish romantic thriller film directed by Santiago Tabernero from a screenplay by Tabernero and Eduardo Noriega, based on the novel Presentimientos by Clara Sánchez. It stars Marta Etura and Eduardo Noriega alongside Alfonso Bassave.

== Plot ==
The couple of Julia and Félix is going through a crisis, so they make a change with a getaway trip to the seaside. After a traffic accident suffered by Julia when going to buy diapers that puts her in a coma, the story bisects in two narrative lines pertaining Julia's dream world and Félix's findings about her in the real world.

== Cast ==
- Marta Etura as Julia
- Eduardo Noriega as Félix
- Alfonso Bassave as Marcus
- Gloria Muñoz as Luisa
- Jack Taylor as Abel
- Irene Escolar as Sandra
- Pepa Charro as Hortensia
- Silvia Tortosa as Sasha
- Jaime Chávarri as Julia's doctor

== Production ==
Penned by Santiago Tabernero and Eduardo Noriega, the screenplay is an adaptation of the novel Presentimientos by Clara Sánchez. A Tornasol Films, Castafiore Films, and Zapping Entertainment production, the film also had the participation of TVE. It was shot in locations of the province of Alicante, including Alicante, Elche, Villajoyosa, and Santa Pola.

== Release ==
The film made its world premiere at the Valladolid International Film Festival (Seminci) on 20 October 2013. Distributed by Syldavia, it was theatrically released in Spain on 24 January 2014.

== Reception ==
Jonathan Holland of The Hollywood Reporter underscored as a bottom line: "intriguing but underachieved", Inside Love's "stab at profundity ironically leaves it looking superficial".

Mirito Torreiro of Fotogramas rated the "aesthetically very well cared for, well narrated" film 3 out of 5 stars, highlighting Etura's performance as the best thing about it while citing as a negative point that the two levels in which the film moves do not always match well.

Sergio F. Pinilla of Cinemanía rated the film 3½ out of 5 stars, considering that by fusing the psychological thriller with the couple crisis, on top of a resort hotel setting, the proposal is imbued of "a certain degree of exoticism and originality".

== See also ==
- List of Spanish films of 2014
