= AuronPlay =

Spanish YouTuber and streamer (born 1988)

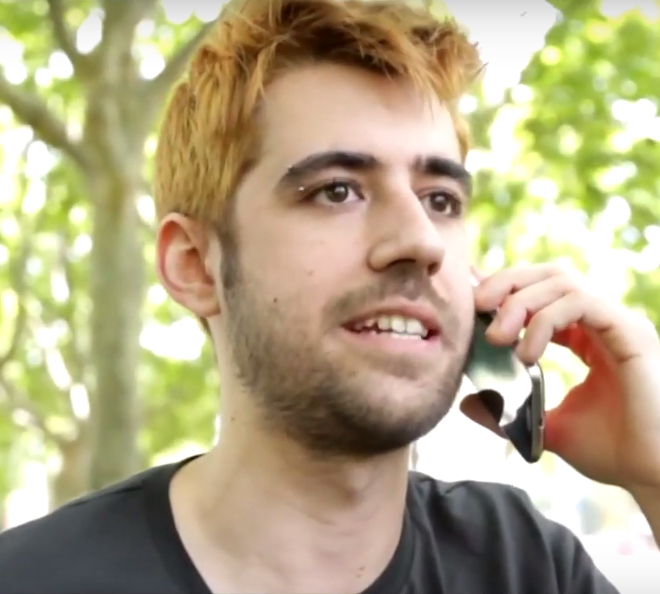
- AuronPlay in 2014
- Born: Raúl Álvarez Genes; 5 November 1988 (age 38); Badalona, Catalonia, Spain
- Other name: Auron
- Occupations: YouTuber; streamer
- Partner(s): Sara Moledo (2013–2023); Gemma "Gemita" Gallardo (2024); Sara Ismael (2024–2026)

Twitch information
- Channel: auronplay
- Years active: 2019–present
- Followers: 17 million

YouTube information
- Channel: AuronPlay
- Years active: 2006–present
- Genres: Comedy (since 2006); Gaming (since 2019)
- Subscribers: 29.1 million
- Views: 4.3 billion
- Last updated: 06 August 2026

Raúl Álvarez Genes (Spanish: [raˈul ˈalβaɾeθ ˈxenes], born 5 November 1988), better known as AuronPlay (Spanish: [awɾomˈplej]) or simply Auron, is a Spanish YouTuber, Twitch streamer, and comedian.

As of February 2023, AuronPlay's YouTube channel has over 4 billion total video views, and he is the fourth most-subscribed YouTuber from Spain, with over 29.1 million subscribers. He is also among the most popular streamers on Twitch, operating the fourth most-followed Twitch channel in the world with 17 million followers on the platform, according to analytics company Social Blade.

== Early life ==
Raúl Álvarez Genes was born 5 November 1988 in Badalona, Catalonia, Spain. Prior to his career as a YouTuber, Álvarez worked at a graphic arts and bookbinding company for nine years starting at the age of sixteen, Raúl decided to quit in 2013, when he was starting to earn more money with YouTube than with his other work.

== Career ==
Álvarez created his YouTube channel in 2006. His online alias, AuronPlay, derives from the name of Auron, a character in the video game Final Fantasy X. In his first videos, he uploaded videos covering his face with a mask, although he later stopped doing so. Some media such as Marca, WATmag or Movistar have cited that the video uploaded on 21 October 2009 titled "Mis aficiones" (My hobbies) is the oldest on his channel, although that is not his first video and there is older content that he has since deleted. In 2012, its popularity began to grow with the "video-reviews". In a 2015 interview with Risto Mejide, he explained that he began making YouTube videos as a hobby, intending to commentate internet videos to "transform them into something funny."

In January 2018 he uploaded his most popular video to date entitled "El niño más pesado de YouTube" (YouTube's most annoying kid). During 2020 his video upload frequency decreased, until November of that year, the month in which he published the last video from his AuronPlay channel, after which he left his main channel to dedicate himself fully to his secondary channel and his Twitch channel. Álvarez started a Twitch channel in September 2019, where he broadcasts gaming and social content. In November 2021 he became the second biggest streamer on Twitch, surpassed only by Ninja, it is currently the second most followed channel on Twitch.

In May 2020, he began participating in a Grand Theft Auto V server of the roleplay genre called Spain RP, where he played the role of Gustabo, along with other streamers. He and his fellow series members announced in August that they would stop playing on that server, which closed on 3 September that year.26 Subsequently, he created a new server called Infamous RP, which opened on 15 September.

In September 2020, he was watching random wedding-related videos on one of his live streams; In one of these videos, a child could be seen showing his buttocks to the person who recorded the video. The platform decided to suspend his Twitch account for a period of 24 minutes and caused a shower of memes that he shared on his social networks. The platform did not give exact explanations of why they banned him, however some media like Dexerto or Flooxer assumed it was due to that video. In April 2021, he participated in Marbella Vice, a server with the same theme as the roleplay created by Ibai Llanos and CooLifeGame on 11 April 2021, which was one of the most watched events on Twitch.

According to the Streams Charts, Álvarez was recognized as one of the most popular Spanish-speaking streamers on Twitch.

=== Other works ===
Álvarez has published several autobiographical books, the first of which he presented at the 2016 Madrid Book Fair. With Spanish YouTuber Wismichu, Álvarez performed live shows under the production company YouPlanet: the first was in 2015 at the Cervantes Theater, Málaga, The second was that same year at the Teatro de la Laboral, Gijón and the third was in 2016 at the Teatro Afundación, Vigo.

During 2018, he conducted various interviews with different YouTubers and streamers for the Flooxer brand, which belongs to Atresmedia; among them: Lolito, and Ibai Llanos. In 2020, for the same platform he presented the series Ritmo Cardíaco, which consisted of "making a guest nervous", its first episode with the participation of Hamza Zaidi was uploaded together on its main channel and on Flooxer on 15 March 2020.

In March 2020, during the COVID-19 pandemic, Álvarez donated seven thousand masks to the Institut Català de la Salut, part of the Catalan health system. At the end of the same year, he made a live broadcast in order to raise funds for the Spanish Federation of Food Banks; the broadcast received approximately €101,000, surpassing the original goal of €80,000. In December of the same year, he put a line of masks called Auron Mask on sale.

On 21 May 2024 he opened a clothing brand named AuronHouse, where he sells T-shirts, sweaters, cups, and sockers.

== Personal life ==
Álvarez was in a relationship with Spanish streamer Sara Moledo, also known by the alias Bjean and Biyín since 2013. The couple ended their relationship in July 2015 as he mentioned in an interview, and returned three months later. In February 2021, the couple announced the end of their relationship through Twitch. In June 2021, the couple confirmed that they had resumed their relationship. In April 2024, they announced that they had ended their relationship at the end of 2023.

In August 2024, it was revealed that Álvarez was in a relationship with fellow Spanish streamer Gemma Gallardo, also known as Gemita. A month later, they broke up. In December 2024, he confirmed that he is dating Egyptian footballer Sara Ismael.

Álvarez currently lives in Andorra.

== Public image ==
GQ Spain has described Álvarez as "the precursor to the vlogger world in Spain" and "a successful YouTuber in Spain in 2020". In 2016, 20 minutos described Álvarez as "one of the most successful YouTubers of Spain" and "one of the most experienced figures in online video production". In October 2020, Forbes Spain included Álvarez on their list of the 100 best influencers in Spain of the year. In a June 2019 Twitter correspondence, El Salvador president Nayib Bukele named Álvarez the country's "minister of YouTube" by "presidential decree".

== Controversies ==
=== Hashtag against Gran Hermano VIP ===
In 2015, he had made a video in which he criticized the third edition of the Spanish version of the program Gran Hermano VIP; at the end of this video, the YouTuber promoted the hashtag #GranHermanoVIH, a play on words between the name of the program and the acronym for the human immunodeficiency virus (HIV). A large number of people criticized the YouTuber on social networks, including the reality's official Twitter account, which responded by appealing to the way in which the influencer criticized the program and suggested give his salary to the fight against VIH. He finally had to retract his words. The name of the hashtag was later changed to #GHVIPesBASURA, as it became the number one trend on Twitter globally on the night of 16 January 2015.

=== Telephone prank to logging company ===
Auron, together with YouTuber Wismichu, uploaded a video in 2016 in which he made several telephone jokes to different Spanish logging companies. The owner of one of the companies that had received the calls (resident in Córdoba, Andalusia) denounced the YouTubers to the Spanish police, as reported by Canal Sur Televisión. He also assured that a large number of calls began to arrive, coming from their subscribers. AuronPlay and Wismichu, for their part, defended themselves against the accusations, pointing out that their video did not show any phone number and that they had not made calls to people from Córdoba, but to people from Galicia and Catalonia, and that they had permission to publish the calls they made.

=== Complaint by Josep Maria Bartomeu ===
In 2017, due to the resignation of player Neymar from Fútbol Club Barcelona, the fans of this football club began to criticize the president of the team at that time, Josep Maria Bartomeu, AuronPlay began to joke about the situation on social networks, referring to Bartomeu as "Nobita" (appealing to the physical similarity between Bartomeu and Nobita Nobi, character of Doraemon) in the publications in which he made these jokes.

In October 2018, he was notified of a criminal complaint made by president Bartomeu to the Spanish Police for "making comments against Fútbol Club Barcelona, the player and president." The Spanish justice finally decided to reject Bartomeu's complaint and Bartomeu subsequently decided to reconcile with AuronPlay in December 2019 at the Camp Nou.

== Awards and nominations ==
Year	Ceremony	Category	Result	Ref.
2021	MTV Millennial Awards	Streamer of the Year	Won	
2021	Kids' Choice Awards Mexico	Gamer MVP	Won	
2021	11th Streamy Awards	Livestreamer	Nominated	
2021	ESLAND Awards	Streamer of the Year	Nominated	

== Works ==
- 2015: De lo peor, lo mejor: los consejos de Auron. Grupo Planeta
- 2016: AuronPlay, el libro. Grupo Planeta
- 2016: El juego del hater. Ediciones Martínez Roca

== See also ==
- List of YouTubers
- List of most-followed Twitch channels
