= A Whale (film) =

- Theatrical release poster
- Spanish: Una ballena
- Directed by: Pablo Hernando Esquisabel
- Screenplay by: Pablo Hernando Esquisabel
- Produced by: Leire Apellaniz
- Starring: Ingrid García-Jonsson; Ramón Barea; Kepa Errasti; Óscar Pastor; Iñigo de la Iglesia; David Pareja; Iñake Irastorza; Paolo Sassanelli
- Cinematography: Sara Gallego Grau
- Edited by: Pablo Hernando Esquisabel
- Production companies: Señor y Señora; Sayaka Producciones; Orisa Produzioni
- Distributed by: Elastica Films
- Release dates: 10 October 2024 (Sitges); 28 March 2025 (Spain)
- Countries: Spain; Italy
- Language: Spanish

A Whale (Spanish: Una ballena) is a 2024 neo-noir fantasy thriller film written and directed by Pablo Hernando. It stars Ingrid García-Jonsson and Ramón Barea.

The film premiered at the 57th Sitges Film Festival on 10 October 2024 ahead of its theatrical rollout in Spain on 28 March 2025 by Elastica Films.

== Plot ==
The plot follows Ingrid, a contract killer who draws her power to vanish without a trace from another world inhabited by monsters.

== Cast ==
- Ingrid García-Jonsson as Ingrid
- Ramón Barea as Melville
- Kepa Errasti as Jonás
- Óscar Pastor as Abasolo
- Iñigo de la Iglesia
- David Pareja
- Iñake Irastorza

== Production ==
In the view of Hernando the film is "first and foremost" "the story of a contract killer in a world of smugglers and mobsters", linking it to Jean-Pierre Melville's Le Samouraï. García-Jonsson cited instead Nicolas Winding Refn's filmography and Under the Skin as references.

The film was produced by Señor y Señora, Sayaka Producciones, and Orisa Produzioni. Shooting locations in Biscay included the artificial island of Zorrotzaurre. Upon wrapping shooting, Hernando reported that the project was going to enter a long post-production because of the profusion of VFX.

== Release ==
The film was presented at the 57th Sitges Film Festival on 10 October 2024. Distributed by Elastica, it is expected to receive a theatrical release in Spain on 28 March 2025.

== Reception ==
Júlia Olmo of Cineuropa described A Whale as "a cross between film noir, science fiction and cosmic horror", lauding it as "a film as cryptic as it is beautiful, and at times hypnotic".

Desirée de Fez of El Periódico de Catalunya rated the film 4 out of 5 stars, writing that it is "visually stunning".

Antonio Trashorras of Fotogramas rated the film 4 out of 5 stars, highlighting its "hypnotic sound and musical design" as the best thing about it.

Miguel Ángel Romero of Cinemanía rated the film 4 out of 5 stars, declaring it "pure visual poetry".

Raquel Hernández Luján of HobbyConsolas gave the film 80 points ('very good'), singling out Sara Gallego's cinematography as the film's best.

Javier Ocaña of El País considered that despite faring better in some aspects than in others, the film "is almost always suggestive thanks to its uniqueness", primarily underpinned by the "dry and sententious" dialogues and the "icy and desolate" atmospheres.

== See also ==
- List of Spanish films of 2025
