= Bad Beast =

- Film poster
- Catalan: Mala bèstia
- Directed by: Bàrbara Farré
- Written by: Bàrbara Farré; Alberto Dexeus
- Starring: Maria Schwinning; Iria del Río; Roger Casamajor
- Cinematography: Lucas Casanovas
- Edited by: Ona Bartrolí
- Music by: Raül Refree
- Production companies: Mimosa Produce; Sumendi; Lágrima Films; Kabak Films; Mamma Team
- Distributed by: A Contracorriente Films
- Release dates: 10 March 2026 (Málaga); 31 July 2026 (Spain)
- Country: Spain
- Language: Catalan

Bad Beast (Catalan: Mala bèstia) is a 2026 fantasy drama film directed by Bàrbara Farré (in her feature debut). It stars Maria Schwinning alongside Iria del Río and Roger Casamajor.

== Plot ==
Atenea, a teenage girl obsessed with the idea of not growing up living in a boarding school, is taken in by a foster family and her instinct leads her to do the unimaginable to in order to avoid being replaced.

== Cast ==
- Maria Schwinning
- Iria del Río
- Roger Casamajor

== Production ==
The screenplay was written by Bàrbara Farré alongside Alberto Dexeus. Referred to by the title of Agrestes during the shooting stage, the film was produced by Mimosa Produce, Sumendi, Lágrima Films, Kabak Films, and Mamma Team, and it had the participation of 3Cat, Filmin, and Movistar Plus+, and backing from ICAA and ICEC. Lucas Casanovas worked as cinematographer, using an Arri Alexa 35 camera and Leica Summilux-C and Angénieux Optimo lenses.

== Release ==
The film was presented in the main competition of the 29th Málaga Film Festival on 10 March 2026. A Contracorriente Films is scheduled to release the film in Spanish theatres on 31 July 2026. Alief acquired sales rights.

== Reception ==
Philipp Engel of Cinemanía rated the "elegant and ethereal timeless fable" 4 out of 5 stars, singling out the revelation of Schwinning and the originality of the mise-en-scène as it main attractions.

Beatriz Martínez of Fotogramas rated the film 4 out of 5 stars, lauding how Farré "manages to craft a unique film, brimming with details, featuring exquisite and elegant planning".

== See also ==
- List of Spanish films of 2026
