= Padial =

Padial is a surname. Notable people with the surname include:

- Victoria Padial (born 1988), Spanish biathlete
- Carlo Padial (born 1977), Spanish comics artist, writer, screenwriter, and film director
- Luis Padial (1832–1879), Puerto Rican soldier
