= Flying Colors (2026 film) =

- Theatrical release poster
- Spanish: Todos los colores
- Directed by: Beatriz de Silva
- Written by: Beatriz de Silva
- Produced by: Nathalie García; Jaime Ortiz de Artiñano; Beatriz Bodegas
- Starring: Mafalda Carbonell; Sílvia Abril; Claudia Mora; Carlota Jiménez; Amalia Martos; Iván Luengo; Javier Tolosa; Israel Arpa; Edu Rejón; Eva Moral
- Cinematography: Daniel Salmones
- Edited by: Ascen Marchena
- Music by: Alicia Morote
- Production companies: Atresmedia Cine; Cattleya Producciones; La Canica Films
- Distributed by: Wanda Visión
- Release dates: 9 March 2026 (Málaga); 12 June 2026 (Spain)
- Running time: 92 minutes
- Country: Spain
- Language: Spanish

Flying Colors (Spanish: Todos los colores) is a 2026 Spanish coming-of-age comedy-drama film written and directed by Beatriz de Silva in her debut fiction feature. It stars Mafalda Carbonell.

== Plot ==
17-year-old Belén is about to finish her Baccalaureate education. Belén, the alpha female of her group of friends and a wheelchair user, is worried about her friends making plans and being left behind. Paralympic athlete Laura helps Belén to find her own path.

== Cast ==
- Mafalda Carbonell as Belén
- Sílvia Abril
- Eva Moral as Laura
- Claudia Mora
- Amalia Martos
- Carlota Jiménez
- Iván Luengo
- Israel Arpa
- Javier Tolosa
- Edu Rejón

== Production ==
The film was produced by Atresmedia Cine, Cattleya Producciones (an ITV Studios subsidiary), and La Canica Films, and it had the participation of Atresmedia and Netflix. It was shot in Madrid.

== Release ==
Flying Colors was presented at the 29th Málaga Film Festival in March 2026. Distributed by Wanda Visión, it is scheduled to be released theatrically in Spain on 12 June 2026.

== Reception ==
Enid Román Almansa of Cinemanía rated the film 3½ out of 5 stars, deeming it to be "youthful, cheerful, carefree, and a little loutish" [...] "that simple—and that spot-on".

== See also ==
- List of Spanish films of 2026
