= Hopelessly Devout =

- Theatrical release poster
- Spanish: Mi querida cofradía
- Directed by: Marta Díaz de Lope Díaz
- Screenplay by: Marta Díaz de Lope Díaz
- Starring: Gloria Muñoz; Pepa Aniorte; Juan Gea; Rocío Molina; Manuel Morón; Carmen Flores; Alejandro Albarracín; Rosario Pardo
- Cinematography: Vanesa Sola
- Edited by: Jordi Martínez
- Music by: Javier Rodero
- Production companies: ESCAC Films; La Zanfoña Producciones; Sacromonte Films
- Distributed by: A Contracorriente Films
- Release dates: 17 April 2018 (Málaga); 4 May 2018 (Spain)
- Running time: 87 minutes
- Country: Spain
- Language: Spanish

Hopelessly Devout (Spanish: Mi querida cofradía, lit. 'my dear confraternity') is a 2018 Spanish comedy film written and directed by Marta Díaz de Lope Díaz (in her feature debut) starring Gloria Muñoz.

== Plot ==
Set against the backdrop of the Holy Week in Ronda, the plot follows Carmen, a member of a Catholic confraternity yearning for coming out on top of the organization who poisons her rival Ignacio.

== Cast ==
- Gloria Muñoz as Carmen
- Juan Gea as Ignacio
- Pepa Aniorte as Beatriz, Carmen's daughter
- Carmen Flores as Juana, a neighbour
- Manuel Morón as Adolfo
- Joaquín Núñez as Beatriz's husband
- Rocío Molina as María, Beatriz's daughter
- Alejandro Albarracín
- Rosario Pardo

== Production ==
The film is an ESCAC Films production alongside La Zanfoña Producciones and Sacromonte Films, and it had the participation of RTVE, Canal Sur, Movistar+. It was shot in Ronda.

== Release ==
The film premiered at the Málaga Film Festival in April 2018. Distributed by A Contracorriente Films, it was released theatrically in Spain on 4 May 2018.

== Reception ==
Javier Ocaña of El País deemed the film to be a "notable" debut for the director, finding remarkable "the highly complex balance [that the film] maintains between ruthless criticism of certain aspects of Holy Week and utter respect for its cultural, social, and even religious essence".

Andrea G. Bermejo of Cinemanía rated the film 3 out of 5 stars, highlighting Carmen Flores Sandoval, "a natural talent for comedy", as the best thing about it, but assessed that the film could have benefitted from being meaner.

Beatriz Martínez of El Periódico de Catalunya praised how the film displays "the ability to shake the foundations of patriarchy without causing offense", "remaining respectful toward believers and atheists alike", but lamented that it could have been perhaps bolder in its embrace of iconoclasm and esperpento.

== Accolades ==
Year	Award	Category	Nominee(s)	Result	Ref.
2018	21st Málaga Film Festival	Audience Award		Won	
2018	21st Málaga Film Festival	Best Supporting Actress	Carmen Flores	Won	
2019	6th Feroz Awards	Best Comedy Film		Nominated	

== See also ==
- List of Spanish films of 2018
