= Uncle Trouble +2 =

- Theatrical release poster
- Spanish: La familia Benetón +2
- Directed by: Joaquín Mazón
- Written by: Curro Velázquez; Benjamín Herranz
- Produced by: Jaime Ortiz; María Luis Gutiérrez; Álvaro Ariza; José M.ª Fernández; Christopher Hool
- Starring: Leo Harlem; El Langui; Anabel Alonso
- Cinematography: Chiqui Palma
- Edited by: Jani Madrileño
- Music by: María Vértiz
- Production companies: Atresmedia Cine; Familia Benetón 2 AIE; Bowfinger International Pictures; Esto También Pasará; Glow; SDB Films
- Distributed by: Beta Fiction Spain
- Release dates: 14 March 2026 (Málaga); 17 April 2026 (Spain)
- Countries: Spain; Mexico
- Language: Spanish

Uncle Trouble +2 (Spanish: La familia Benetón +2, lit. 'the Benetón family +2') is a 2026 comedy film directed by Joaquín Mazón and written by Curro Velázquez and Benjamín Herranz. A follow-up to Uncle Trouble (2024), it stars Leo Harlem and El Langui.

== Plot ==
After the events of Uncle Trouble, Toni Benetón seems to have control over the multicultural family, but the addition of two new members upends the whole thing, taking them to Africa.

== Cast ==
- Leo Harlem as Toni
- El Langui as Lolo
- Anabel Alonso as Carmen
- Pepe Viyuela as Emiliano
- Enrique Villén
- Iñaki Miramón
- Llum Barrera
- Alí Dia as Hassán
- Diego Montejo as Walter
- Gala Bichir as Ximena
- Meilin Chen as Ming
- Kamsiyochi Ngene as Kanene

== Production ==
The film was produced by Atresmedia Cine, Familia Benetón 2 AIE, Bowfinger International Pictures, Esto También Pasará and Glow alongside SDB Films, with the participation of Atresmedia, Netflix, Mogambo, and Crea SGR, the association of Film Factory and backing from ICAA. Shooting locations included Madrid and Gran Canaria.

== Release ==
Uncle Trouble +2 screened as the closing film of the 29th Málaga Film Festival on 14 March 2026. Distributed by Beta Fiction Spain, it was released theatrically in Spain on 17 April 2026.

== Reception ==
Alberto Corona of eldiario.es highlighted a racist form of representation conveyed by the film, otherwise resenting "the feeling of watching several episodes of a series strung together without any sense of coherence" [rather than a film].

Enid Román Almansa of Cinemanía rated the film 1 out of 5 stars, citing that the saddest thing was admitting that it was a single scripted scene that actually managed to bring a smile to the reviewer's face.

== See also ==
- List of Spanish films of 2026
