= A Contracorriente Films =

Spanish film company

- Industry: Entertainment
- Founded: 2009; 17 years ago
- Headquarters: Barcelona, Spain
- Products: Motion pictures
- Services: Film distribution/production

A Contracorriente Films is a Spanish film distribution and production company. It is based in Barcelona.

== History ==
The company was founded in 2009 in Barcelona by Adolfo Blanco along with other Notro Films people, including Amalia Blanco Lucas, Eduardo Escudero de Zuloaga, and Sergio González Páez. The Cove was the first film distributed by the company.

Since 2014, A Contracorriente has also operated as an exhibitor by purchasing some theatres, including Cines Verdi (in Madrid and Barcelona). In 2021, investment fund Suma Capital acquired a 40% stake in A Contracorriente Films. In 2022, A Contracorriente released a subscription and rental streaming service, Acontra+. In 2024, A Contracorriente Films purchased the 100% of anime distributor SelectaVisión.

== Releases ==
Filmax films released in the 2020s
Release date (Note: The listed date refers to the film's theatrical release in Spain by A Contracorriente Films, not necessarily its first screening or when it premiered.)	Title	Director(s)	Ref.
26 April 2013	Yesterday Never Ends	Isabel Coixet	
1 January 2014	Turning Tide	Christophe Offenstein	
30 April 2014	Carmina and Amen	Paco León	
4 June 2015	Requirements to Be a Normal Person	Leticia Dolera	
13 November 2015	An Autumn Without Berlin	Lara Izagirre	
4 December 2015	Food and Shelter	Juan Miguel del Castillo	
12 April 2017	Black Snow	Martín Hodara	
10 November 2017	The Bookshop	Isabel Coixet	
2 March 2018	Empowered	Santiago Segura	
4 May 2018	Hopelessly Devout	Marta Díaz de Lope Díaz	
13 July 2018	The Best Summer of My Life	Dani de la Orden	
15 March 2019	Mirai	Mamoru Hosoda	
29 March 2019	Get Her... If You Can	Inés de León	
13 September 2019	Litus	Dani de la Orden	
4 October 2019	Seventeen	Daniel Sánchez Arévalo	
18 October 2019	The Goya Murders	Gerardo Herrero	
22 November 2019	Out in the Open	Benito Zambrano	
14 February 2020	The Wedding Unplanner	Dani de la Orden	
5 May 2020	Vivarium	Lorcan Finnegan	
7 August 2020	Color Out of Space	Richard Stanley	
18 September 2020	One for All	David Ilundain	
19 February 2021	New Order	Michel Franco	
26 April 2021	Peninsula	Yeon Sang-ho	
10 September 2021	Carpoolers	Martín Cuervo	
3 December 2021	Love Gets a Room	Rodrigo Cortés	
18 March 2022	Code Name: Emperor	Jorge Coira	
13 May 2022	Unfinished Affairs	Juan Miguel del Castillo	
27 May 2022	The Dinner Guest	Ángeles González-Sinde	
29 July 2022	Football Heroes of the Block	Ángeles Reiné	
30 September 2022	Argentina 1985	Santiago Mitre	
14 October 2022	Wild Flowers	Jaime Rosales	
28 October 2022	Chickenhare and the Hamster of Darkness	Benjamin Mousquet, Ben Stassen	
11 November 2022	The Beasts	Rodrigo Sorogoyen	
2 December 2022	Cork	Mikel Gurrea	
13 January 2023	The Substitute	Diego Lerman	
28 April 2023	Someone Who Takes Care of Me	Daniela Fejerman, Elvira Lindo	
2 June 2023	The Enchanted	Elena Trapé	
9 June 2023	Father & Soldier	Mathieu Vadepied	
23 June 2023	Not Such an Easy Life	Félix Viscarret	
11 August 2023	Godland	Hlynur Pálmason	
25 August 2023	A Giant Adventure	Eduardo Schuldt	
1 September 2023	Jump!	Olga Osorio	
15 September 2023	Friends Till Death	Javier Veiga	
6 October 2023	Chinas, a Second Generation Story	Arantxa Echevarría	
11 October 2023	Sound of Freedom	Alejandro Monteverde	
27 October 2023	The Movie Teller	Lone Scherfig	
1 December 2023	The Night My Dad Saved Christmas	Joaquín Mazón	
20 December 2023	The Taste of Things	Tran Anh Hung	
12 January 2024	Perfect Days	Wim Wenders	
2 February 2024	The Teachers' Lounge	İlker Çatak	
8 March 2024	The Extortion	Martino Zaidelis	
15 March 2024	Radical	Christopher Zalla	
19 April 2024	Dragonkeeper	Salvador Simó, Li Jianping	
1 May 2024	La casa	Álex Montoya	
31 May 2024	A Difficult Year	Éric Toledano, Olivier Nakache	
28 June 2024	Invasión	David Martín Porras	
3 July 2024	The Bus of Life	Ibon Cormenzana	
23 August 2024	Mr. Blake at Your Service!	Gilles Legardinier	
6 September 2024	The 47	Marcel Barrena	
13 September 2024	Artificial Justice	Simón Casal	
20 September 2024	Milagros: An Extraordinary Bear	Eduardo Schuldt	
15 November 2024	The Last Romantics	David Pérez Sañudo	
22 November 2024	The Girls at the Station	Juana Macías	
20 December 2024	The Flamenco Guitar of Yerai Cortés	Antón Álvarez	
31 January 2025	The Party's Over	Elena Manrique	
7 March 2025	Afternoons of Solitude	Albert Serra	
4 April 2025	Deaf	Eva Libertad	
11 April 2025	The Second Act	Quentin Dupieux	
9 May 2025	This Too Shall Pass	Maria Ripoll	
16 May 2025	El cuento del lobo	Norberto López Amado	
23 May 2025	The Exiles	Belén Funes	
6 June 2025	Cuatro paredes	Ibon Cormenzana	
18 July 2025	Bob Trevino Likes It	Tracie Laymon	
22 August 2025	The Return	Uberto Pasolini	
3 October 2025	Loveable	Lilja Ingolfsdottir	
17 October 2025	The Dinner	Manuel Gómez Pereira	
28 November 2025	Flores para Antonio	Elena Molina, Isaki Lacuesta	
5 December 2025	Golpes	Rafael Cobos	
20 February 2026	My Wife Is a Ghost	Maria Ripoll	
1 April 2026	Welcome to Lapland	David Serrano	
15 May 2026	Pizza Movies	Carlo Padial	
26 June 2026	North to Paradise	Dani Sancho	
24 July 2026	The Birthday Party	Miguel Ángel Jiménez	
7 August 2026	The Open Window	Ana Graciani	
21 August 2026	On Fire	Estel Díaz	
21 August 2026	Broken Voices	Ondřej Provazník	
26 August 2026	The Beloved	Rodrigo Sorogoyen	
4 September 2026	Swarm	Óscar Bernàcer	
