= Elastica Films =

Spanish film company

- Industry: Entertainment
- Founded: 2021; 5 years ago
- Founders: Enrique Costa; María Zamora
- Headquarters: Valencia, Spain
- Products: Motion pictures
- Services: Film distribution/production

Elastica Films, or simply Elastica, is a Spanish film production and distribution company based in Valencia.

== History ==
Elastica Films was founded in 2021 in Valencia by producer María Zamora and distributor Enrique Costa, who had both previously worked in the Madrid-based company Avalon. In the wake of the amiable nature of the split with Avalon, Elastica has since collaborated with the latter in films such as Alcarràs and Matria.

Elastica was the main producer behind Golden Bear winner Alcarràs (2022). Other titles developed by the company include The Rye Horn, Creatura, Salve Maria, The Red Virgin, and Romería. As a distributor, some of the company largest box-office releases in Spain have included Triangle of Sadness (€1.12 million), Anatomy of a Fall (€2.5 million), Alcarràs (€2.36 million), The Substance (3.6 million), Emilia Pérez (€1.84 million), The Zone of Interest (€1.3 million), and The Worst Person in the World (€900.000), and Backrooms (over €1.7 million). In 2026, their release La bola negra grossed more than €34 million and had more than five million admissions.

On 12 June 2026, Filmin signed an agreement to acquire Elastica's acquisitions and distribution operations; the two companies remain autonomous, with their teams set to work together on acquisitions. The deal gives Filmin exclusive streaming rights to high-profile titles that Elastica acquires, although other windows for the company's titles continue to be negotiated separately and existing deals for certain films remain in place.

== Releases ==
Elastica films released in the 2020s
Release date (Note: The listed date refers to the film's theatrical release in Spain by Elastica Films, not necessarily its first screening or when it premiered.)	Title	Director(s)	Ref.
20 August 2021	Annette	Leos Carax	
29 October 2021	Petite Maman	Céline Sciamma	
11 March 2022	The Worst Person in the World	Joachim Trier	
19 January 2024	The Zone of Interest	Jonathan Glazer	
25 August 2023	The Girls Are Alright	Itsaso Arana	
6 December 2023	Anatomy of a Fall	Justine Triet	
19 April 2024	La chimera	Alice Rohrwacher	
30 August 2024	The Other Way Around	Jonás Trueba	
27 September 2024	The Red Virgin	Paula Ortiz	
11 October 2024	The Substance	Coralie Fargeat	
31 October 2024	Salve Maria	Mar Coll	
28 March 2025	A Whale	Pablo Hernando	
5 September 2025	Romería	Carla Simón	
3 October 2025	Strange River	Jaume Claret Muxart	
5 December 2025	Sentimental Value	Joachim Trier	
9 January 2026	Nouvelle Vague	Richard Linklater	
20 February 2026	The Secret Agent	Kleber Mendonça Filho	
24 April 2026	Sound of Falling	Mascha Schilinski	
8 May 2026	I Won't Die for Love	Marta Matute	
29 May 2026	Runner	Laura García Alonso	
5 June 2026	Backrooms	Kane Parsons	
31 July 2026	Mother Mary	David Lowery	
28 August 2026	Erupcja	Pete Ohs	
25 September 2026	La bola negra	Javier Calvo, Javier Ambrossi	
9 October 2026	NAZA	Yuval Abraham, Rachel Szor	
6 November 2026	Pray for Us	Daniel Monzón	
27 November 2026	Sisters	Ione Hernández	
