= Welcome to Lapland =

- Theatrical release poster
- Spanish: Lapönia
- Directed by: David Serrano
- Written by: Cristina Clemente; Marc Angelet
- Based on: Lapònia by Cristina Clemente, Marc Angelet, and Jordi Casanovas
- Produced by: Javier Méndez
- Starring: Natalia Verbeke; Julián López; Ángela Cervantes; Vebjørn Enger; Blanca Ramírez; Adrián Gamiz
- Cinematography: Joan Bordera
- Edited by: Miguel Ariza
- Music by: Joan Martorell
- Production company: The Mediapro Studio
- Distributed by: A Contracorriente Films
- Release dates: 9 March 2026 (Málaga); 1 April 2026 (Spain)
- Running time: 89 minutes
- Country: Spain
- Language: Spanish

Welcome to Lapland (Spanish: Lapönia, lit. 'Lapland') is a 2026 Spanish comedy film directed by David Serrano and written by Cristina Clemente and Marc Angelet based on their own play Lapònia. It stars Natalia Verbeke, Julián López, Ángela Cervantes, and Vebjørn Enger.

It world premiered at the 29th Málaga Film Festival in March 2026 ahead of its 1 April 2026 theatrical rollout in Spain by A Contracorriente Films.

== Plot ==
Nuria, a resident in Lapland with her husband Olavi and her daughter, invites her sister Mónica, her brother-in-law and her nephew to a Christmas stay in Rovaniemi. Havoc ensues when Nuria's daughter tells her cousin that Father Christmas does not exist, triggering family strife and the resurfacing of buried secrets.

== Cast ==
- Ángela Cervantes as Nuria
- Natalia Verbeke and Mónica
- Julián López as Ramón
- Vebjørn Enger as Olavi

== Production ==
A The Mediapro Studio production, the film had the participation of Movistar Plus+, RTVE, and 3Cat. Joan Bordera worked as cinematographer, using an Arri Alexa 35 camera and Arri Signature Primes lenses. Shooting locations in the Basque Country included a house near Getxo.

== Release ==
The film premiered at the 29th Málaga Film Festival in March 2026. It was released theatrically in Spain on 1 April 2026 by A Contracorriente Films.

== Reception ==
Andrea G. Bermejo of Cinemanía rated the film 4 out of 5 stars assessing that Serrano brings the play to the screen brilliantly using very few elements.

Pablo Vázquez of Fotogramas rated the film 4 out of 5 stars, applauding "the triumphant return of Natalia Verbeke, who has never looked better".

Luis Martínez of El Mundo gave the film a 2-star rating, describing it as a "naïf and even extravagantly conservative" comedy, pointing out that the cast meet the requirements, despite the "obvious shortcomings of a story that is convinced it is far more clever than it actually is".

Elsa Fernández-Santos of El País deemed the film to be very theatre-like vis-à-vis the dialogue, yet also carefully tuned and staged when it comes to the mise-en-scène.

== See also ==
- List of Spanish films of 2026
