= Gloria Muñoz (actress) =

Spanish actress (born 1948)

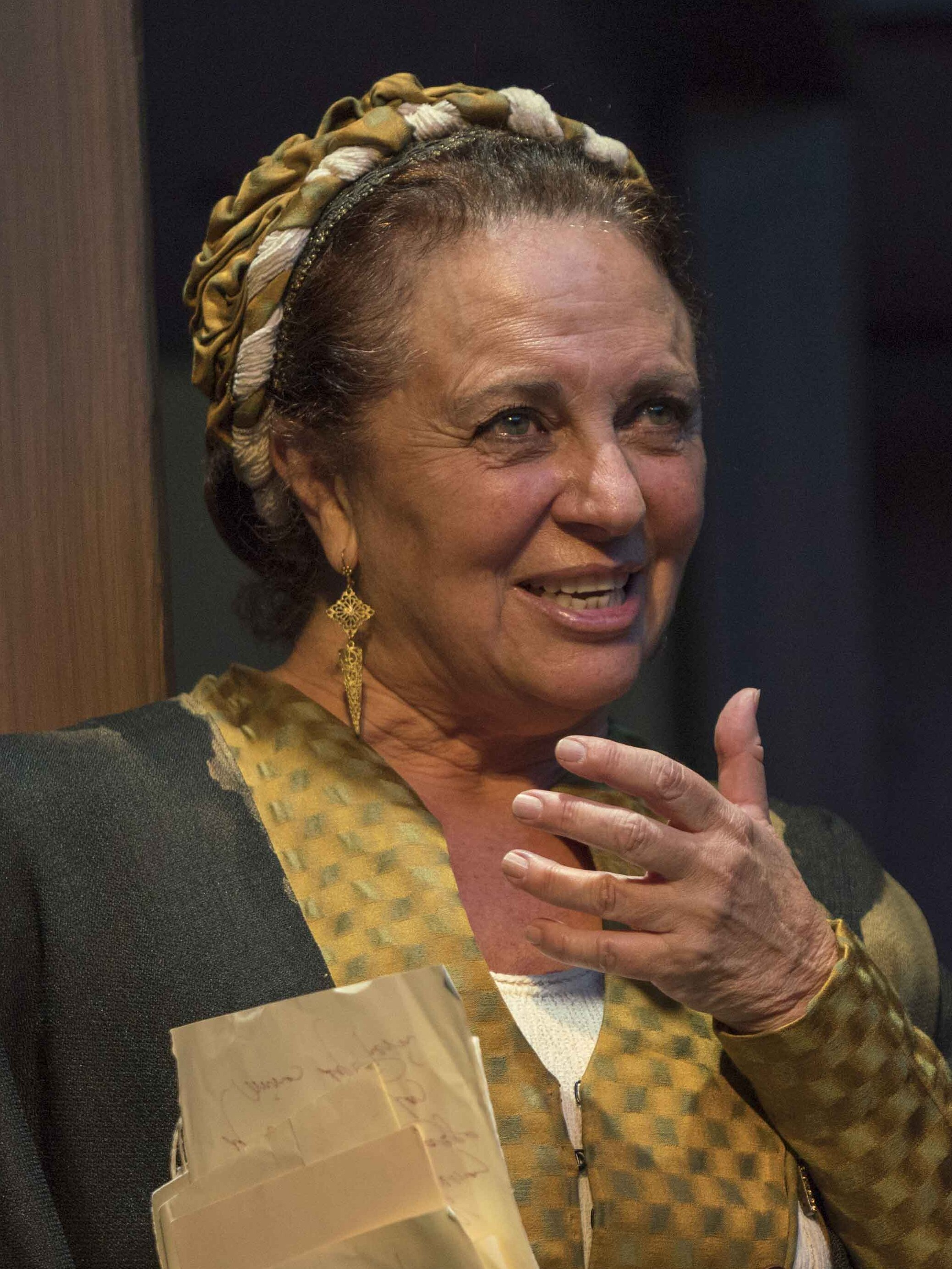
- At the 41st Almagro's International Classical Theatre Festival in 2018 during a staging of Mestiza
- Born: Gloria Rodríguez Gallego; 9 July 1948 (age 77); Madrid, Spain
- Occupation: Actress
- Years active: 1965–present

Gloria Rodríguez Gallego (born 9 July 1948), known for her stage name Gloria Muñoz, is a Spanish theatre, film and television actress.

== Biography ==
Gloria Rodríguez Gallego (her real name) was born on 9 July 1948 in Madrid. Already in 1965, she was working in the theatre group led by Amelia de la Torre and Enrique Diosdado.

She had a son, Julián Ortega, with director and actor José Antonio Ortega. Julián died on 25 August 2024 at 41 years of age.

== Filmography ==
Film

Year	Title	Role	Notes	Ref
1987	La vida alegre	Elvira		
1995	La flor de mi secreto (The Flower of My Secret)	Alicia		
1999	Manolito Gafotas (Manolito Four Eyes)	Asunción		
2000	Año mariano	Sor Trini		
2000	El Bola (Pellet)	Aurora, madre de Pablo		
2002	Deseo	Lola		
2004	Torapia	Paca		
2004	Franky Banderas	Lola		
2013	Presentimientos (Inside Love)	Luisa		
2014	La vida inesperada (The Unexpected Life)			
2018	Mi querida cofrafía (Hopelessly Devout)	Carmen		
2018	Yucatán	Carmen		
2023	Los buenos modales (Good Manners)	Manuela		

Television

Year	Title	Role	Notes	Ref
2011–13	Gran Reserva	Rosalía Ortiz		
2015	Bajo sospecha	Pilar Sánchez		
2018–19	La otra mirada	Doña Manuela		
2019–21	Señoras del (h)AMPA	Josefina Carmona		
2021	Besos al aire (Blowing Kisses)	Dolores		
2024	Land of Women	Mariona		

== Accolades ==
Year	Award	Category	Work	Result	Ref.
2001	10th Actors Union Awards	Best Film Performance in a Minor Role	Pellet	Nominated	
2004	13th Actors and Actresses Union Awards	Best Stage Actress in a Leading Role	Bicycles Are for the Summer	Won	
2011	20th Actors and Actresses Union Awards	Best Stage Actress in a Leading Role	All My Sons	Won	
