= The Open Window (film) =

- Theatrical release poster
- Spanish: La ventana abierta
- Directed by: Ana Graciani
- Screenplay by: Ana Graciani
- Based on: La ventana abierta by Ana Graciani; "The Open Window" by Saki
- Produced by: Olmo Figueredo González-Quevedo
- Starring: Unax Ugalde; Adriana Camarena; Mara Guil; Alberto López; Adriana Espina; Sofía Allepuz
- Cinematography: Alejandro Espadero
- Edited by: Ana Álvarez-Ossorio
- Music by: Paloma Peñarrubia
- Production companies: La Claqueta PC; La Cruda Realidad; Acheron Films; Amania Films; Filmgate Miami
- Distributed by: A Contracorriente Films
- Release dates: 12 May 2026 (FANT); 7 August 2026 (Spain)
- Running time: 79 minutes
- Countries: Spain; United States
- Language: Spanish

The Open Window (Spanish: La ventana abierta) is a 2026 psychological thriller film directed by Ana Graciani (in her debut feature) based on her own play, in turn loosely inspired by the short story "The Open Window" by Hector Hugh Munro "Saki". It stars Unax Ugalde, Adriana Camarena, and Mara Guil.

== Plot ==
Set in the coast of Cádiz, a man moves to a remote Andalusian town to meet online match Merche, only to find there an open window and Merche's teen daughter Vera.

== Cast ==
- Unax Ugalde as Rubén
- Mara Guil as Merche
- Adriana Camarena as Vera
- Alberto López
- Adriana Espina
- Sofía Allepuz

== Production ==
The film is based on Graciani's play La ventana abierta (2015), in turn adapting the 1911 short story "The Open Window" by Saki. The film was produced by La Claqueta PC alongside La Cruda Realidad, Amania Films, Acheron Films, and Filmgate Miami, and it had the participation of Canal Sur.

== Release ==
The film world premiered at the 32nd Bilbao Fantastic Film Festival (FANT). Distributed by A Contracorriente Films, it was released theatrically in Spain on 7 August 2026.

== Reception ==
Toni Vall of Cinemanía rated the film 3 out of 5 stars, declaring it "imperfect and uneven, but undoubtedly bold, brimming with intent, craftsmanship, and narrative".

In a 3-star rating, Luis Martínez of El Mundo deemed the whole to be "a charming exercise in wickedness that is as brilliant as it is, in fact, kind", slightly held back by its lack of ambition.

Philipp Engel of La Vanguardia rated the film 3 out of 5 stars, billing the result as "a film that is as interesting as it is playful—and somewhat unsettling—that you enjoy enduring".

== See also ==
- List of Spanish films of 2026
