= Iván & Hadoum =

- Spanish theatrical release poster
- Directed by: Ian de la Rosa
- Written by: Ian de la Rosa
- Produced by: Stefan Schmitz; Emilia Fort; Jose Alba; Odile Antonio-Baez; Carlotta Schiavon
- Starring: Silver Chicón; Herminia Loh
- Cinematography: Beatriz Sastre
- Edited by: Yannick Leroy
- Production companies: Avalon; Pecado Films; Vayolet; Iván & Hadoum AIE; Port au Prince; Saga Film
- Distributed by: Avalon
- Release dates: 13 February 2026 (Berlinale); 12 June 2026 (Spain)
- Running time: 102 minutes
- Countries: Spain; Germany; Belgium
- Languages: Spanish; Arabic

Iván & Hadoum is a 2026 romantic drama film written and directed by Ian de la Rosa. Starring Silver Chicón and Herminia Loh, it follows the love story of the trans man Iván and the Moroccan-Spanish woman Hadoum. It is a Spanish-German-Belgian co-production.

The film had its world premiere on 13 February 2026 in the Panorama section of the 76th Berlin International Film Festival, where it won the Teddy Award for Best Film. It was also presented at the 29th Málaga Film Festival ahead of its Spanish theatrical release on 12 June 2026 by Avalon.

== Plot ==
A worker in a greenhouse of the province of Almería, trans man Iván, falls for Moroccan-Spanish co-worker Hadoum, but a promotion upends their relationship.

== Cast ==
- Silver Chicón as Iván
- Herminia Loh as Hadoum

== Production ==
The project won the €20,000 Eurimages Co-Production Development Award at the 2023 Berlinale Co-Production Market. The film, de la Rosa's directorial debut feature, is a Spanish-German-Belgian co-production by Avalon (Stefan Schmitz and Emilia Fort), Pecado Films (Jose Alba and Odile Antonio-Baez), Vayolet (Carlotta Schiavon) and Iván & Hadoum AIE alongside Port au Prince (Roshanak Khodabakhsh and Jan Krüger) and Saga Film (Flavia Biurrun and Hubert Toint). It also received backing from RTVE, Canal Sur, Movistar Plus+, ZDF/ARTE, BNP Paribas Fortis Film Finance, ICAA, Junta de Andalucía, ICEC, Creative Europe MEDIA, Eurimages, and ICO.

Shooting locations in the province of Almería included the neighborhood of Barranquete (Níjar). In July 2025, filming was reported to have already wrapped.

== Release ==
Avalon secured Spanish distribution rights. Paris-based Indie Sales acquired sales rights to the film ahead of the European Film Market.

The film had its world premiere in the 'Panorama' section of the 76th Berlin International Film Festival on 13 February 2026. For its Spanish premiere, it was programmed in the official selection of the 29th Málaga Film Festival. It was also programmed at the 41st Guadalajara International Film Festival as en entry eligible for the Maguey Award, and in the 'Love' strand of the 70th BFI London Film Festival. It is scheduled to be released theatrically in Spain on 12 June 2026.

== Reception ==
On the review aggregator website Rotten Tomatoes, 100% of 10 critics' reviews are positive, with an average rating of 6.2/10.

Nikki Baughan of ScreenDaily declared the film "a fresh and intriguing new entry into the LGBTQ+ space".

Martin Kudláč of Cineuropa wrote that the film "brings together elements of the romance genre and social drama in a measured register that resists toppling into overt melodrama".

John Lynn of International Cinephile Society rated the film 3½ out of 5 stars, assessing that rather than about the suffering of its characters, the film is "about hope and a world in which all people can love and be loved without having society's preconceived notions win out".

Gloria Pintueles of La Voz de Asturias determined the film to be a "suggestive and honest exploration of the conditions under which love is possible today".

Manuel J. Lombardo of Diario de Sevilla gave the film a 3-star rating, writing that it displays "the merit of not offering many explanations or passing judgment on its somewhat elusive and at times unlikable or contradictory characters", going all in on the potential of a mutual attraction "portrayed with as much (physical) honesty as delicacy".

Elsa Fernández-Santos of El País wrote that the film "navigates between two tensions—gender and class—while avoiding many clichés", with the distancing from stereotypes turning to be one of the film's strengths.

== Accolades ==
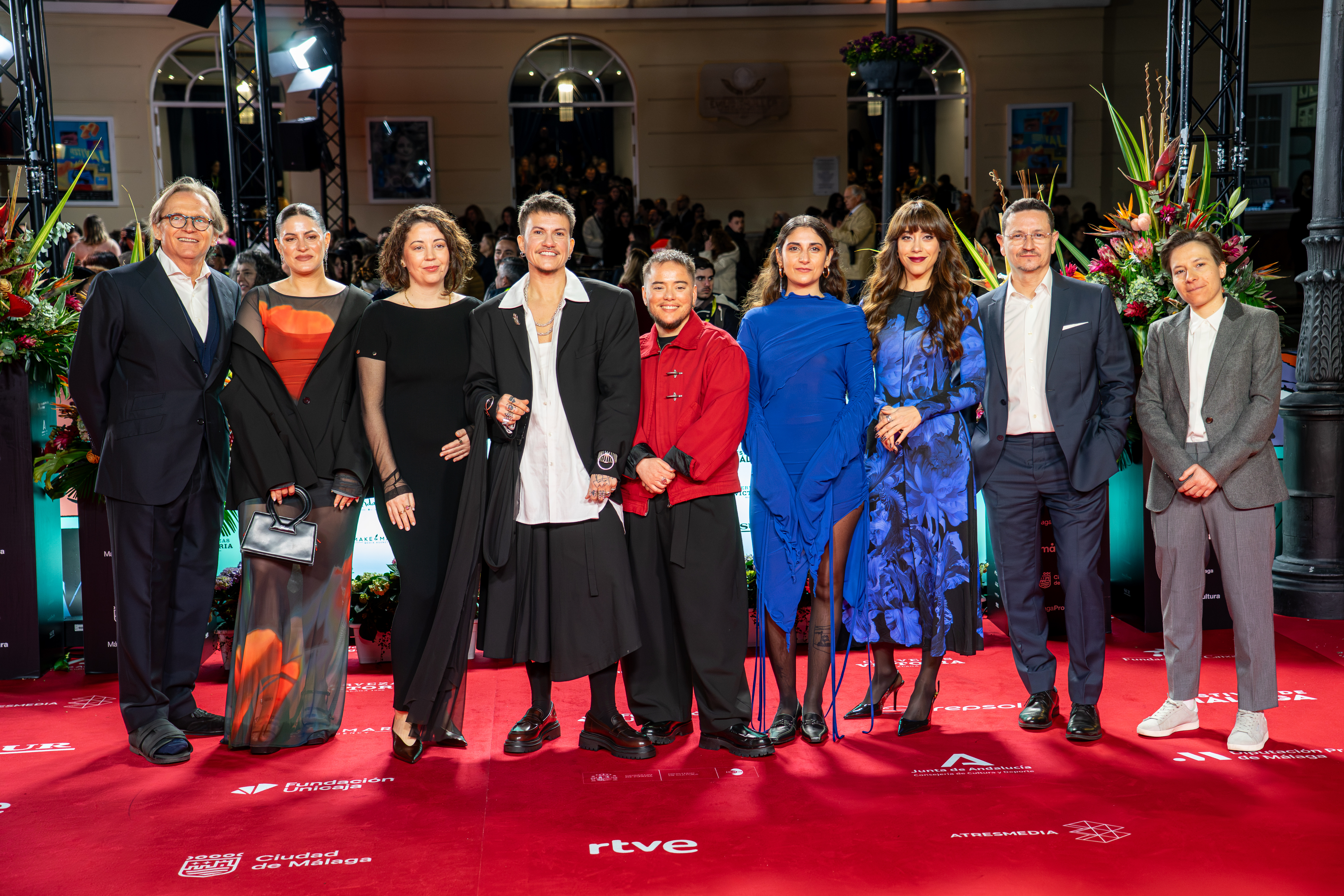
Crew and cast members attending the 29th Málaga Film Festival.

Award	Date of ceremony	Category	Recipient(s)	Result	Ref.
Berlin International Film Festival	20 February 2026	Teddy Award	Ian de la Rosa	Won	
Málaga Film Festival	14 March 2026	Silver Biznaga, Special Jury Prize		Won	
Málaga Film Festival	14 March 2026	Silver Biznaga for Best Screenplay	Ian de la Rosa	Won	
Inside Out Film and Video Festival	2026	Best International Film	Ian de la Rosa	Won	
Brussels International Film Festival	September 2026	Young Jury Prize		Won	
Forqué Awards	19 December 2026	Cinema and Education in Values		Pending	

== See also ==
- List of Spanish films of 2026
