= Good Manners (2023 film) =

- Theatrical release poster
- Spanish: Los buenos modales
- Directed by: Marta Díaz de Lope Díaz
- Screenplay by: Marta Díaz de Lope Díaz; Zebina Guerra
- Produced by: Aintza Serra; Mercedes Gamero; Sergi Casamitjana
- Starring: Elena Irureta; Gloria Muñoz; Pepa Aniorte; Carmen Flores Sandoval; Ricard Farré; Bárbara Santa-Cruz; Inma Cuesta
- Cinematography: Vanesa Sola
- Edited by: Jordi Martínez
- Music by: Joan Martorell
- Production companies: Atresmedia Cine; Escándalo Films; ESCAC Studio
- Distributed by: Warner Bros. Pictures
- Release dates: 12 March 2023 (Málaga); 28 April 2023 (Spain)
- Country: Spain
- Language: Spanish

Good Manners (Spanish: Los buenos modales) is a 2023 Spanish comedy-drama film directed by Marta Díaz de Lope Díaz which stars Elena Irureta and Gloria Muñoz.

== Plot ==
Two sisters (Rosario and Manuela) who have been feuding for years are reunited by their grandchildren, who had met in turn via their respective maids Trini and Milagros.

== Cast ==
- Elena Irureta as Rosario
- Carmen Flores Sandoval as Milagros
- Gloria Muñoz as Manuela
- Pepa Aniorte as Trini
- Ricard Farré as Roberto
- Inma Cuesta as Mónica
- Jordina Sala as Carmen
- Oriol Camps as Daniel
- Bárbara Santa-Cruz
- Neus Sanz
- Rafaela Rivas

== Production ==
Good Manners was produced by Atresmedia Cine, Escándalo Films, and ESCAC Studio, and it had the participation of Atresmedia and Movistar Plus+. It was shot in Barcelona in 2021.

== Release ==
The film debuted in the 'Málaga Premiere' section of the 26th Málaga Film Festival on 12 March 2023. Distributed by Warner Bros. Pictures España, the film was released theatrically in Spain on 28 April 2023, grossing €106,843 (15,530 admissions) in its opening weekend.

== Reception ==
Pere Vall of Fotogramas deemed the film to feature "a splendid quartet of protagonists", highlighting the conversations between Trini and Milagros as the best thing about the film.

Javier Ocaña of Cinemanía rated the film 3 out of 5 stars, underscoring it to be "a worthy Almodovarian surrogate with affection for its characters".

== See also ==
- List of Spanish films of 2023
