= Wismichu =

Spanish YouTuber (born 1993)

- Born: Ismael José Prego Botana; 5 October 1993 (age 32); A Coruña, Galicia, Spain
- Other name: Wismichu
- Education: Rey Juan Carlos University
- Occupation: YouTube personality

YouTube information
- Channels: Wismichu; Wismitwo
- Years active: 2008–present
- Genre: Dark humor
- Last updated: 28 August 2018

Ismael José Prego Botana (born 5 October 1993), better known as Wismichu, is a Spanish YouTuber. His videos consist mostly of satirical video blogs, often characterized by a critical tone and a dark style of humour. Apart from publishing two comics and a book, Ismael appeared in the 2014 movie Torrente 5: Operación Eurovegas and also produced in 2019 a movie titled Vosotros sois mi película.

== Biography ==
Ismael José Prego Botana was born on 5 October 1993, in A Coruña, located in the autonomous community of Galicia, Spain. He moved to Madrid to study Audiovisual Communication at the Rey Juan Carlos I University. In 2008 he began uploading videos to YouTube, initially gameplays. Nowadays, his videos often consist of videoblogs, pranks, and parodies, mostly infused with an absurdist and dark style of humour.

In all his social networks and video games, Prego used the name "Wisma", with which his friends knew him. However, when creating his YouTube account, he could not put it because only names with 8 characters were allowed, so he decided to add a few more characters and create the new name, "Wismichu".

In 2014 he had a cameo in the comedy crime film Torrente 5: Operación Eurovegas, in 2016 he published his first book Si te rindes, pierdes, and in 2017 he published his first comic Norman y Mix. On 12 September 2018 he announced that the shooting of his first movie, named Bocadillo starring fellow YouTubers Joaquín Albero (JoaquínPA), David Cajal (Kajal Napalm) and María Rubio (Miare's Project), it was also produced by the YouPlanet company. The film was released at the Sitges Film Festival on 12 October 2018, and the trailer that announced said film ranked first in trends in Spain with a total of 1 million views.

At its release, the film was defined as a joke on the part of Luisa Jabato. On 17 October 2018 was revealed he was working on a documentary film directed by Carlo Padial, and Bocadillo was a part of the documentary. His Vosotros soís mi película's film trailer was released on 10 March 2019, and the movie already mentioned and produced by YouPlanet was released in Flooxer on 31 March 2019. From November 2018 he presents a podcast series with Kajal and Joaquín named W-Podcast where they interview contestants, in 2019 he published the sequel of Norman y Mix called Norman y Mix 2: Hazte villano.

== Personal life ==
Since October 2013, Prego lived and dated his girlfriend Ingrid, whose relationship ended in mid-2019. He currently lives in Barcelona. Ismael is outspoken about his choice to be a vegan for ethical reasons. In September 2021, he showed through Twitter his support for the Communist Party of the Workers of Spain in his plan to nationalize the electric companies. In 2022, he revealed that he had been suffering from left ear problems for almost a decade.

== Controversies ==
Wismichu during his career had several controversies. In 2015, when the Wismichu channel was shut down for several days after being reported and flagged for having "explicit sexual content." A petition on Change.org amassed over 21,000 online signatures in favor of reinstating the Wismichu channel, and it was ultimately restored. In September 2016, Álvaro Ojeda filed a police report against Wismichu for threats, after he jokingly claimed that he was "coming for Alvaro Ojeda" in his "Pokemania" video, the report was dropped by police because it was not classified as a threat.

In 2018 he appeared in the Movistar+ TV show La Resistencia, hosted by David Broncano. It was defined as the worst interview, due he broke a cup on his own accord and then run away from the set. Later Ismael apologized to both the program and the public, stating that "he wanted to make a nod to when Ignatius broke cups in the 1st season." In April 2021, he and Dalas Review were denounced by inCruises International, a subscription-based world cruise travel company. Based on the fact that they committed the crime of defamation, claiming that with their videos about them they caused many people not to want to join the membership club.

=== Telephone prank to logging company ===
In 2016, Wismichu uploaded a video in which he together with YouTuber AuronPlay made several telephone jokes to different Spanish logging companies. The owner of one of the companies that had received the calls (resident in Córdoba, Andalusia) denounced the YouTubers before the Spanish police, as reported by the same on Canal Sur Televisión; He also assured that a large number of calls began to arrive, coming from their subscribers. AuronPlay and Wismichu, for their part, defended themselves against the accusations, alleging things such as the fact that their video had not showed no phone number or that they had not made calls to people from Córdoba, but to people from Galicia and Catalonia, and that they had permission to publish the calls they made.

=== Bottle attack ===
In October 2017, Wismichu was denounced for attacking a 21-year-old young man with a bottle of beer in the early morning of 30 September. According to one of the complainant male's female companions, Wismichu began to discuss the conflict in Catalonia and the figure of The King with the alleged victim and, after a good time of discussion, the tenants of the apartment decided to evict Ismael from the house. Faced with this situation, Wismichu, who was sitting in the living room at the time, took a bottle of beer and hit the complainant three times on the head, according to the complaint filed with the police.

After what happened, the attacked young man went to the emergency room, where he was diagnosed with an occipital laceration and contusion, so they had to put five staples in his head, along with some stitches. At 9:00 a.m., he went to the offices of the police to file a complaint against Ismael Prego. On the recommendation of his lawyer, the young man did not want to make any statements in this regard. On 9 September 2017, a female friend of the victim posted several tweets about case, along with some images of the shirt and the floor full of blood.

Later Wismichu uploaded a video to his secondary channel titled No hagáis lo que yo (video that is currently not available), in which although he admits to having committed the act, on the other hand, affirms that the tone of the discussion rose too much to the point that the subject threatened him saying "either you leave my fucking house or I'll break your fucking head." After that threat, Wismichu remembered the fascist aggressions that were taking place in what was then Catalonia, and as a consequence of the fear he had, he grabbed the only thing he had in his hand, which was a bottle, and it began to hit him on the head, until finally fleeing from there.

=== Complaint for libel and slander ===
Video of Ismael Prego's lawyer, David Bravo, in which he discusses the trial

On 4 October 2017, Wismichu uploaded a video titled "Así es Dalas Review", video that on 6 October 2017, got 7 million views and on 20 June 2018, got 15 million, currently has around 20 million views. In it apart from bringing out the "miseries" of Dalas Review, he accuses of having several complaints for gender violence. Besides insinuating that he fled to Ireland to escape the Spanish law, he refers to him with the pejorative phrases "miserable", "psychopath", "hyena", "bad person", "wretch" and "bastard".

In 2018, Santomé sued Prego for the alleged crime of libel and slander against him in that video, claiming a penalty of nine months in jail, and a 15,000 euros fine. At the end of 2019 Santomé uploaded to his main channel a video titled "Denuncié a Wismichu" (I Sued Wismichu), in which he talks about the lawsuit filed a year earlier against Prego for the video that "damaged his career".

One year later on 17 December, the trial was finally held where it would be analyzed whether or not Wismichu actually slandered Dalas, he was supported by the Sevillian lawyer David Bravo. In 2021, the 25th criminal court of Barcelona acquitted Ismael Prego of the accusations of slander and insults perpetuated by Daniel Santome. A few days later, Bravo uploaded a video to his YouTube channel explaining in more detail the case between Dalas and his client.

=== Complaint for child pornography ===
On the afternoon of 5 July 2021, EDATV.com journalist Hugo Pereira announced through Twitter the complaint against Ismael Prego for the alleged crime of child pornography. Pereira also revealed parts of the complaint EDATV.com and Estado de Alarma TV. According to Pereira, Ismael used the Chatroulette site to allegedly record minors showing their private parts, mainly their breasts, and then post those uncensored videos on his "wismichu.net" site. Two victims in that lawsuit were eleven and twelve years old when Prego allegedly recorded them.

=== Complaint against NauterPlay ===
He with his lawyer David Bravo denounced the Extremaduran YouTuber Marcos Pascual González known as NauterPlay for insulting him with the following phrases: Piece of shit, coward, bastard, pig, trash, asshole, half fool, bug, idiot, puppet and mongolo. Said insults and insidious references were made in up to 13 videos published between 31 December 2019, and 22 February 2020. The lawsuit claimed that there was a defamatory campaign through these videos.

Nauter lawyer Fernando Cumbres defended him stating that he did not say any of this with his real name and also said that Isma projects a deplorable image of himself with his YouTuber fights and "insult and hatred profitable". Initially 30,000 euros were claimed, however on 4 November 2022, The Court of First Instance number 48 of Barcelona sentenced Nauter to pay only 1,500 euros for the crime of illegitimate interference with honor. He was also sentenced to remove the parts where he insults him, upload a video reading the sentence with a "clear and intelligible" narration and refrain from insulting him with identical or similar terms.
