= North to Paradise =

- Theatrical release poster
- Catalan: Viatge al país dels blancs
- Directed by: Dani Sancho
- Written by: Guillem Clua
- Based on: Viaje al país de los blancos by Ousman Umar
- Produced by: Ibon Cormenzana; Jaime Ortiz de Artiñano
- Starring: Emma Vilarasau; Ousman Umar; Benjamin Kakraba; Victor Sey
- Edited by: David Gallart
- Music by: Laetitia Pansanel-Garric
- Production companies: Mundo Cera Crea; Atresmedia Cine; A Contracorriente Films; Mundo Cero AIE; Arcadia Motion Pictures; Noodles Production
- Distributed by: A Contracorriente Films
- Release dates: 8 March 2026 (Málaga); 26 June 2026 (Spain)
- Running time: 110 minutes
- Countries: Spain; France
- Languages: Catalan; Spanish; Akan

North to Paradise (Catalan: Viatge al país dels blancs) is a 2026 biographical drama film directed by Dani Sancho and written by Guillem Clua. It is based on the autobiography by Ousman Umar, who also stars along with Emma Vilarasau and Benjamin Kakraba.

== Plot ==
The plot follows the story of a young Ghanaian who leaves his hometown and starts off a new life in Barcelona.

== Cast ==
- Benjamin Kakraba as Ousman (young)
- Ousman Umar as himself
- Emma Vilarasau as Montse
- Jordi Bosch as Armando

== Production ==
Based on the autobiographical book by Ousman Umar, the film is a Spanish-French co-production by Atresmedia Cine, Mundo Cero Crea, Mundo Cero AIE, A Contracorriente Films, Arcadia Motion Pictures, and Noodles Production, with the participation of Atresmedia and financial backing from ICAA and ICEC.

== Release ==
Cast and crew members attending the 2026 Málaga Film Festival

The film was presented on 8 March 2026 at the 29th Málaga Film Festival. It was also selected as the opening film of the 10th BCN Film Fest. Distributed by A Contracorriente Films, it was released theatrically in Spain on 26 June 2026.

It landed its international premiere at the 13th Saint-Jean-de-Luz International Film Festival.

== Reception ==
Toni Vall of Cinemanía rated the film 3 out of 5 stars, welcoming a well-told story with just the right amount of fuss.

Oti Rodríguez Marchante of ABC gave the film a 3-star rating, assessing that the best and most moving sequences are those involving Vilarasau.

Paco Peris of Públic deemed the film to be a "solid story, very efficient from a emotional standpoint", as well as capable of "maintaining the tension throughout and constantly engaging the viewer".

== See also ==
- List of Spanish films of 2026
