= Ladies' Hunting Party =

- Film poster
- Spanish: Día de caza
- Directed by: Pedro Aguilera
- Screenplay by: Pedro Aguilera; Lola Mayo
- Based on: The Hunt by Carlos Saura and Angelino Fons
- Produced by: Jaime Gona
- Starring: Carmen Machi; Rossy de Palma; Blanca Portillo; Zoé Arnao
- Cinematography: Eva Díaz
- Edited by: Clara Martínez Malagelada
- Music by: Fernando Vacas
- Production companies: Gonita; Día de caza AIE; Mondex & Cie
- Distributed by: Sideral Cinema
- Release dates: 8 October 2025 (Cinespaña); 5 June 2026 (Spain)
- Countries: Spain; France
- Language: Spanish

Ladies' Hunting Party (Spanish: Día de caza) is a 2025 drama film directed by Pedro Aguilera and co-written by Lola Mayo remaking the 1966 film The Hunt directed by Carlos Saura. It stars Carmen Machi, Rossy de Palma, Blanca Portillo, and Zoé Arnao.

== Plot ==
The plot follows three middle age women and friends (Rosa, Carmen, and Blanca) who meet along with Rosa's sullen niece for hunting rabbits in a hunting ground inherited by Blanca.

== Cast ==
- Carmen Machi as Carmen
- Rossy de Palma as Rosa
- Blanca Portillo as Blanca
- Zoé Arnao as Diana

== Production ==
Conceived as a modern-day revision of Carlos Saura's The Hunt, the film was produced by Gonita Filmaccion (Jaime Gona) and Día de caza AIE alongside Mondex & Cie and it had the participation of RTVE and Movistar Plus+. It was shot in locations of the province of Cáceres, including a rural estate in Pedroso de Acim. Anna Saura (Carlos Saura's daughter) participated as an executive producer.

== Release ==
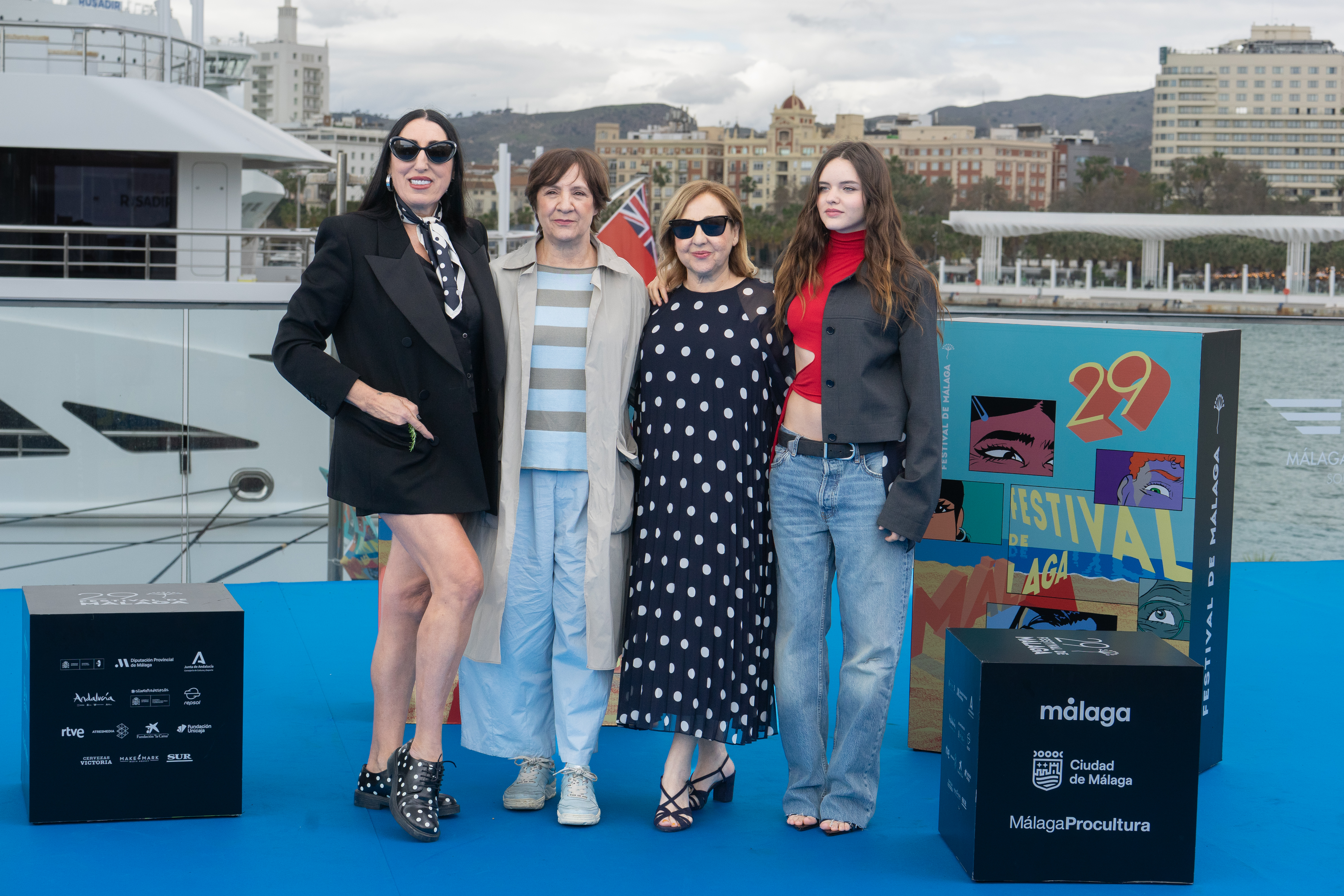
De Palma, Portillo, Machi, and Arnao attending the 2026 Málaga Film Festival

Ladies' Hunting Party's presentation was programmed for 8 October 2025 at the Toulouse Spanish Film Festival (Cinespaña). The Spanish theatrical release was originally scheduled for 10 October 2025, but it was postponed to 2026. For its Spanish premiere, it finally made it to a non-competitive official selection slot of the 29th Málaga Film Festival. Sideral is scheduled to release the film in Spanish theatres on 5 June 2026.

== Reception ==
Alfonso Rivera of Cineuropa observed that the film succeeds both as a "social critique of power and its abuses, corruption, resentment and frustration" and as "a humorous yet scathing portrait of a section of society that rejects equality".

== See also ==
- List of Spanish films of 2026
