= Antia Botana =

Spanish-American physicist

Antia Sánchez Botana is a Spanish and American physicist whose research involves the theoretical and experimental investigation of quantum materials such as nickelate superconductors, quantum spin liquids, and multiferroics. She is an associate professor of physics at Arizona State University.

== Education and career ==
Botana grew up in northwestern Spain, and was educated at the University of Santiago de Compostela, where she received a bachelor's degree in 2008, a master's degree in 2010, and a Ph.D. in 2013.

Next, she became a postdoctoral researcher at the University of California, Davisfrom 2013 to 2015, and at the Argonne National Laboratory from 2015 to 2018. She joined Arizona State University as an assistant professor of physics in 2018 and was promoted to associate professor in 2023.

== Recognition ==
The Laboratoire d’Alliances Nanosciences-Energies du Futur in Grenoble, France, named Botana to a three-year visiting chair of excellence position in 2022. Botana was a 2025 recipient of the Presidential Early Career Award for Scientists and Engineers.
