= Ian de la Rosa =

Spanish screenwriter and director

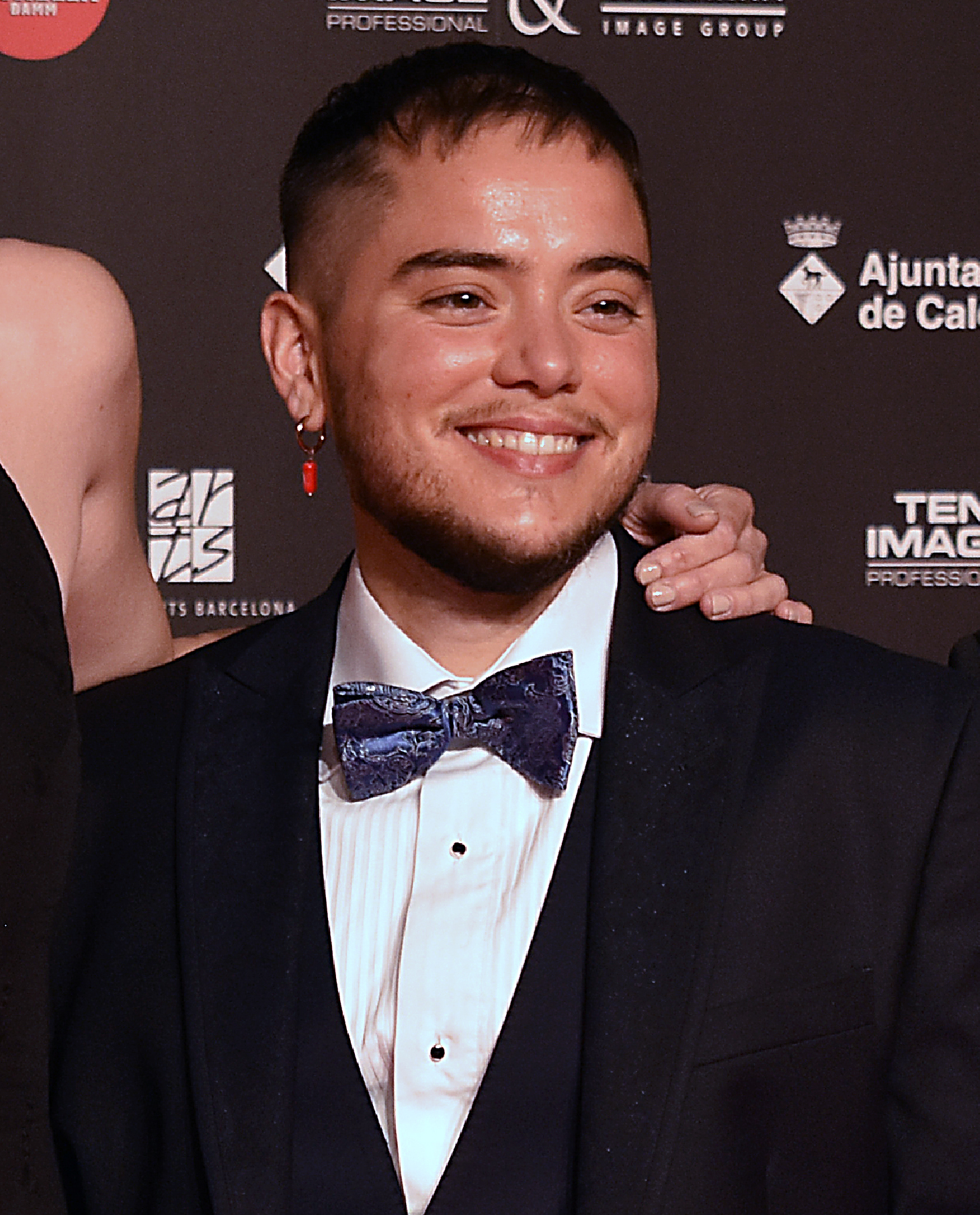
- de la Rosa in 2022
- Born: 1988 (age 37–38); Granada, Spain
- Education: Cinema and Audiovisual School of Catalonia
- Occupations: Screenwriter and director

Ian de la Rosa (born 1988) is a Spanish screenwriter and director of movies and television.

== Career ==
Ian de la Rosa was born in Granada in 1988 and grew up in Níjar, in the province of Almería. He completed his studies at the Cinema and Audiovisual School of Catalonia. In 2015 he directed his final degree project, the short film Víctor XX, a drama that addressed the topic of transidentity and for which he received one of the first Cinéfondation awards at the Cannes Film Festival.

In 2022 his short film Farrucas was nominated at the 36th Edition of the Goya Awards in the Best Short Film category. Farrucas also received the Gaudí Award for best short film, and was also awarded at the Elche International Independent Film Festival and in the Palencia International Film Festival.

In February 2023, he won the Eurimages Coproduction Award for his debut feature, Iván & Hadoum.

== Filmography ==
Short film

Year	Title	Director	Writer
2015	Víctor XX	Yes	Yes
2021	Farrucas	Yes	Yes

Television

Year	Title	Director	Writer	Notes
2018	Desayuna conmigo 360°	No	Yes	2 episodes
2020	Veneno	No	Yes	8 episodes
2023	Vestidas de azul	Yes	No	1 episode
2023	La chica invisible	No	Yes	8 episodes

Feature film

Year	Title	Director	Writer
2020	I'm Being Me	Yes	Yes
2026	Iván & Hadoum	Yes	Yes
