= Raúl Álvarez (baseball) =

Cuban baseball player

- Pitcher
- Born: 1902 (age 123–124); Havana, Cuba

Negro league baseball debut
- 1924, for the Cuban Stars (West)

Last appearance
- 1932, for the Cuban Stars (East)
- Stats at Baseball Reference

Teams
- Cuban Stars (West) (1924–1925); Cuban Stars (East) (1927, 1930–1932)

Raúl Álvarez Rafael (1902 – death unknown) was a Cuban pitcher in the Negro leagues between 1924 and 1932.

A native of Havana, Cuba, Álvarez made his Negro league debut in 1924 for the Cuban Stars (West). He played for the minor league Tampa Smokers in 1926, and played one season (1927–28) in the Cuban League for Habana. His final Negro league season came in 1932 with the Cuban Stars (East).
