= Clara Sánchez (writer) =

Spanish novelist (born 1955)

The Most Excellent Clara Sánchez
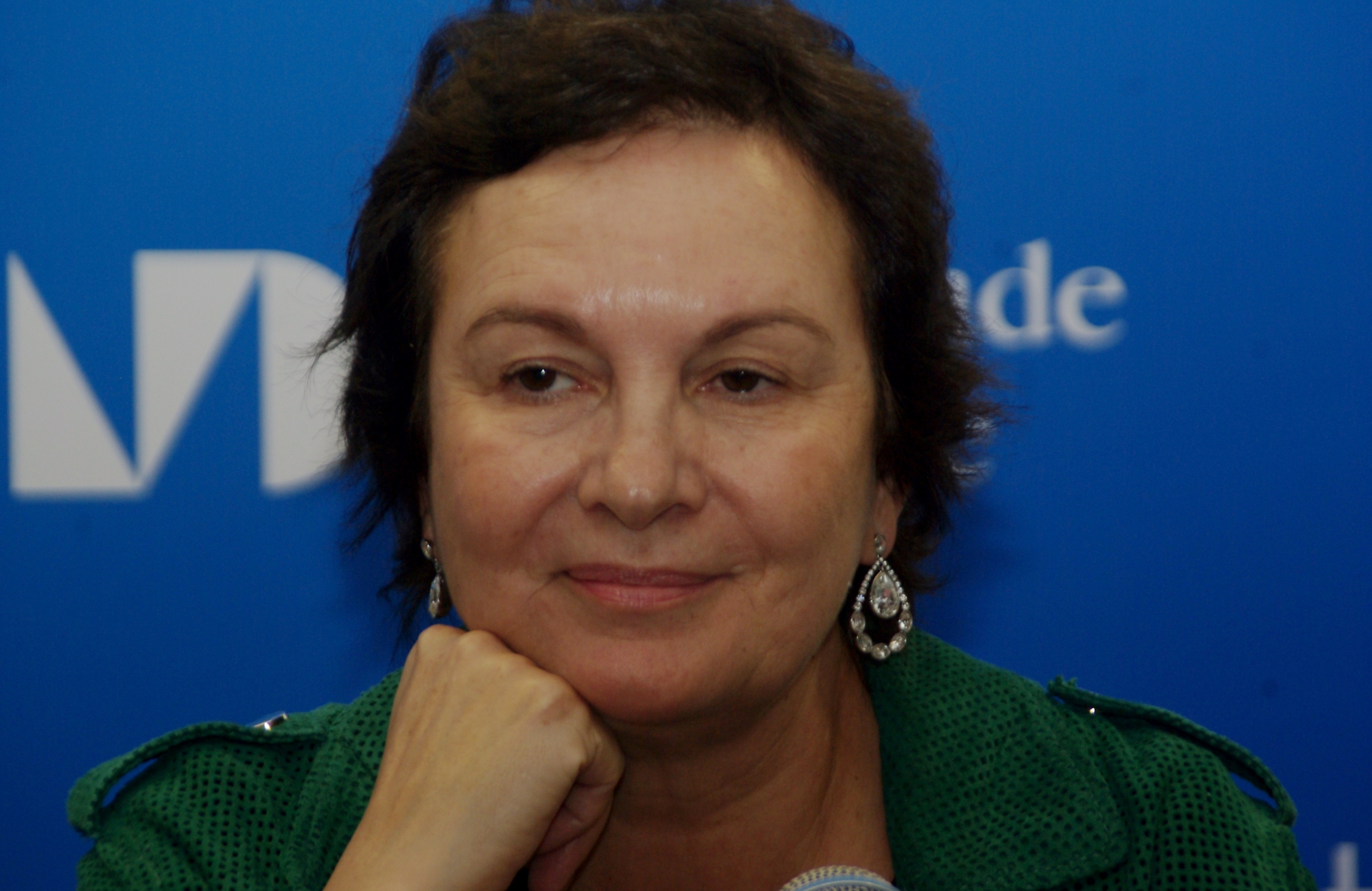
- Sánchez at the Miami Book Fair International, 2014.
- Born: 1 March 1955 (age 71); Guadalajara, New Castile, Spain
- Occupation: Author

Seat X of the Real Academia Española
- Incumbent
- Assumed office 8 October 2023 (Note: Elected on 23 March 2023)
- Preceded by: Francisco Brines

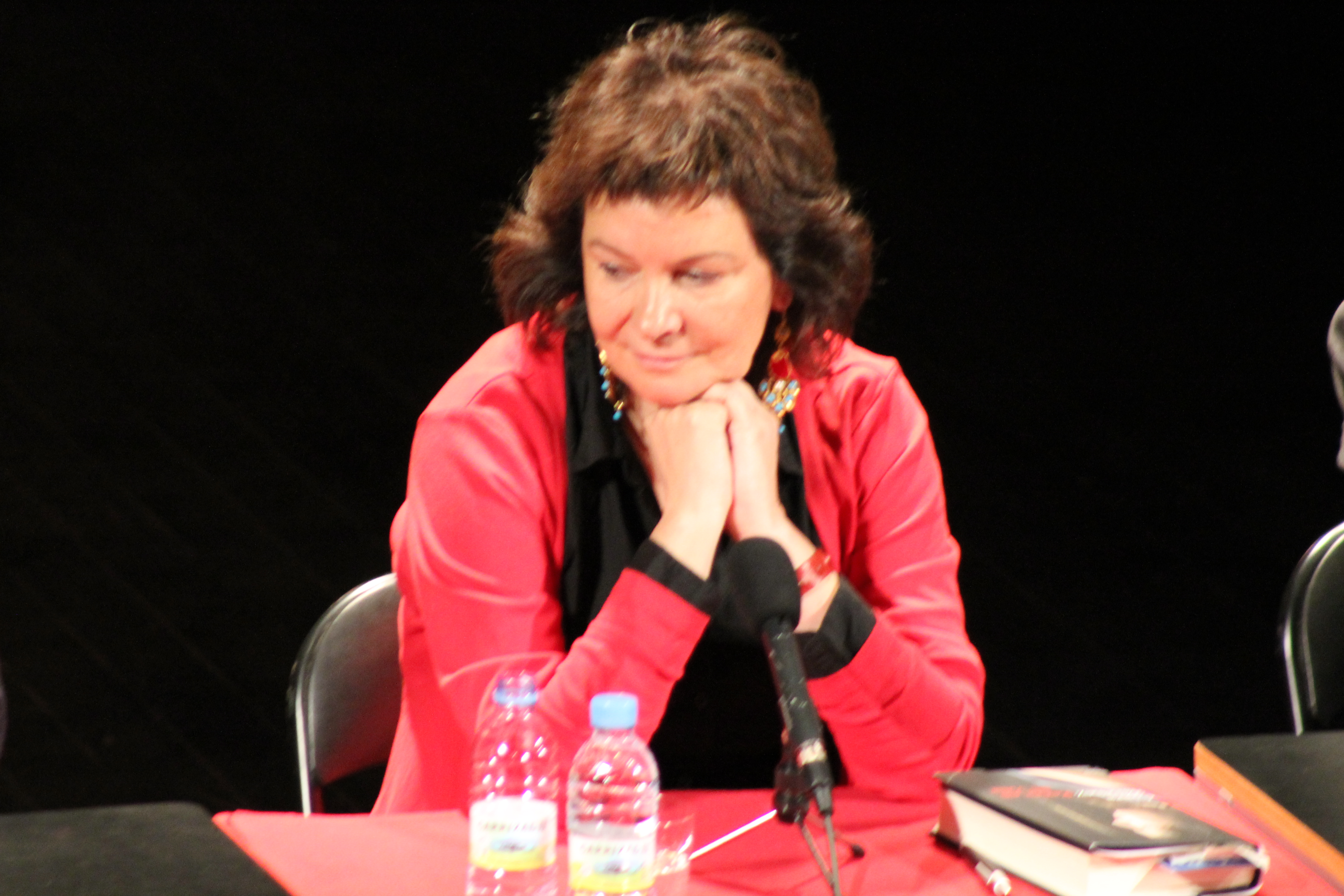
Encuentros de Clubs de lectura de Asturias

Clara Sánchez (born 1 March 1955) is a Spanish novelist. Among other literary awards, Sánchez won the 2013 Premio Planeta de Novela for her novel El cielo ha vuelto. She was elected to seat X of the Real Academia Española on 23 March 2023; she took up her seat on 8 October 2023.

Born in Guadalajara, Spain, she earned her degree in Spanish philology from Complutense University of Madrid. Since receiving her degree, she has taught at the National University of Distance Education.

Sánchez has provided prefaces for the works of foreign authors including Yukio Mishima and Andrzej Szczypiorski, has written for a variety of national periodicals, and has been an occasional contributor to the Televisión Española series ¡Qué grande es el cine! directed by José Luis Garci. Her debut novel, Piedras preciosas (1989), received critical acclaim. In common with her subsequent work, it employs intimistic, costumbrist prose and cynical humor to reveal the inadequacies of the modern world. After No es distinta la noche (1990) and El palacio varado (1993) came Desde el mirador (1996), an exploration of human vulnerability taking the form of a portrait of a forty-year-old woman; El misterio de todos los días (1999), the story of a professor who falls in love with one of her students; and Últimas noticias del paraíso (2000), an exploration of the confusion and alienation of contemporary youth, which won the prestigious Alfaguara Prize in 2000. Her work has been published both in Spain and Latin America.

In 2010 Sanchez received the Premio Nadal for her novel Lo que esconde tu nombre, a psychological thriller whose protagonists include a Spanish republican survivor of Mauthausen-Gusen concentration camp and an alienated young woman who cross paths with an elderly Nazi couple in the Costa del Sol.

== Novels ==
- Piedras Preciosas (1989)
- No es distinta la noche (1990)
- El palacio varado (1993)
- Desde el mirador (1996)
- El misterio de todos los días (1999)
- Últimas noticias del paraíso (Premio Alfaguara 2000), Ed. Alfaguara, Madrid.
- Un millón de luces (2003) Ed. Alfaguara, Madrid. ISBN 84-204-0070-X
- Presentimientos (2008)
- Lo que esconde tu nombre (Premio Nadal 2010) Ed. Destino, Barcelona.
- Entra en mi vida (2012)
- El cielo ha vuelto (Premio Planeta de Novela, 2013)
