= Rafael Muga =

Spanish football manager (born 1939)

Rafa Muga
Personal information
- Full name: Rafael Manuel Ruiz Muga
- Date of birth: 24 December 1945 (age 80)
- Place of birth: Puebla de Alcocer, Extremadura, Spain

Managerial career
- Years: Team
- 1971–1980: Spain XI women

Rafael Manuel Ruiz Muga is a Spanish former football manager. He was the first Spain women's national football team manager and is regarded as an important founding figure of modern women's football in Spain.
