= Flooxer =

Spanish streaming media brand

- Website type: Streaming media
- Available in: Spanish
- Owner: Atresmedia
- Website: atresplayer.com/flooxer
- Commercial: Yes
- Registration: None
- Launched: November 17, 2015; 10 years ago

Flooxer is a Spanish brand of original audiovisual streaming content which belongs to Atresmedia. Initially its own platform, the brand and content from Flooxer were integrated into the Atresplayer platform with the launch of its Premium offer in September 2019.

In July 2016, the streaming television series Paquita Salas, created by Javier Ambrossi and Javier Calvo, was premiered on Flooxer. Due to the success of the series, Netflix acquired the rights to air the second season. The series won the Premios Feroz for Best Comedy Series.

In 2019, Flooxer released the documentary film Vosotros sois mi película, directed by Carlo Padial and starring Wismichu.
