= Mari Carmen Izquierdo =

Spanish sports journalist (1950–2019)

- Born: María del Carmen Izquierdo Vergara; 1 May 1950; Lerma, Province of Burgos
- Died: 30 July 2019 (aged 69); Madrid
- Education: Official School of Journalism
- Occupation: Journalist
- Employers: Diario AS; Televisión Española; Marc; Diario 16; Pueblo; Informaciones; Gráfico Deportivo

María del Carmen Izquierdo Vergara (22 February 1950 – 30 July 2019) was a Spanish journalist, pioneer of sports journalism.

== Biography ==
Born in Lerma, Province of Burgos on 22 February 1950, Izquierdo graduated in the Official School of Journalism of Madrid. Her career has been closely linked to sports information and was at the time a true pioneer of the female presence in Spain in this area of journalism traditionally reserved for men.

She began this activity in the Diario AS sports journal and a year later she entered Televisión Española. She was the first woman to report on sports in the history of Spain, and in the first stage she reported in the 24-hour news (1970–1972) directed by Manuel Martín Ferrand in La 2 channel.

Later she would carry out tasks of presentation in the sport spaces Tiempo y marca and Estudio Estadio, and at the end of the seventies and principally in the eighties she was in charge of the Sports section in Telediario, the main information of the chain.

At the same time she was able to cover various events such as the Olympic Games, World Cups or European Football and other sports.

In the world of radio, in 1987, she was appointed Chief of Sports of Radiocadena Española.

In print media, she has also collaborated with the Marc, Diario 16, Pueblo and Informaciones newspapers and has been the assistant director of the Gráfico Deportivo magazine.

The last stage of her professional career has been the director of Executive Production of TVE Sports Programs for almost ten years and subsequently as Deputy General Director of the ADO Plan. She has combined that with the Presidency of the Spanish Association of the Sports Press between 1993 and 2013.

Among the awards received, there is the Silver Medal for Sports Merit. Other honorary posts that she has held include Vocal of the Governing Council of Quinielas, Patron of the Foundation of the Professional Soccer League, member of the Spanish Olympic Committee, and Jury of the Princess of Asturias Awards for Sports.

She died in Madrid as a result of pancreatic cancer.
