= Dalas Review =

Spanish YouTuber (born 1989)

- Dalas Review in 2016
- Born: Daniel José Santomé Lemus; 31 October 1993 (age 32); Santa Cruz de Tenerife, Spain
- Occupation: YouTuber

YouTube information
- Channel: DalasReview
- Years active: 2012–present
- Subscribers: 10.8 million
- Views: 3.15 billion
- Last updated: 14 October 2026

Daniel José Santomé Lemus (born 31 October 1993), best known by his YouTube channel name, Dalas Review, is a Spanish YouTuber who posts opinion videos on current events.

== Early life ==
Daniel José Santomé Lemus was born on 31 October 1993, in Santa Cruz de Tenerife, Spain. He was given a computer when he was three years old and began drawing in it. By the time he was about 11 or 12, he had learnt how to create 3D modelling designs and was using Photoshop. After YouTube was created, he began adding subtitles to film trailers using nonsense text. He enrolled in college to study multimedia but dropped out in his second year because he found the course boring and already knew what was being taught.

== Career ==
Santomé created his username using part of his name. His YouTube channel, Dalas Review, was created in 2012 to produce gameplay videos, but then shifted to generate humorous videos and commentary on other content creators. In 2016, Dalas published his first book, Fugitivos en el Tiempo, a young adult novel. By that same year, the book had already sold more than 16,000 copies across four editions. As of November 2017, his YouTube channel had over 5 million subscribers, making it the 17th most subscribed channel in Spain.

== Legal issues ==
Dalas has attracted controversy for his comments. In 2023, a civil court ruling was issued against him for making defamatory remarks about the father of a former partner on 82 occasions across nine videos. He was fined 12,000 euros and sentenced to read public apologies for one month on his YouTube channel.
