= Marta Díaz de Lope Díaz =

- Díaz de Lope Díaz in 2026
- Born: 14 February 1988 (age 38); Ronda, Andalusia, Spain
- Education: ESCAC
- Occupations: Film director; screenwriter

Marta Díaz de Lope Díaz (born 14 February 1988) is a Spanish filmmaker. She has directed Hopelessly Devout (2018), Good Manners (2023), and Another League (2026).

== Life and career ==
Marta Díaz de Lope Díaz was born on 14 February 1988 in Ronda. In 2012, she earned a degree from the ESCAC film school in Catalonia with a specialisation in directing. Early body of work included her short films Y otro año, perdices (2013) and Los pestiños de mamá (2016) as well as the direction of some episodes of the series Brigada de fenómenos.

Her feature film debut, the comedy Hopelessly Devout (2018), tackled a story of female empowerment against the backdrop of the Semana Santa. It was followed by the comedy-drama Good Manners (2023) about the broken family relationship of two sisters at odds with each other. She directed episodes of the SkyShowtime series Las invisibles. Her third film, Another League (2026) was co-written along with Zebina Guerra and dealt with the pioneers of women's football in Spain.
