= Daniel Ibáñez =

Argentine footballer

Personal information
- Full name: Daniel Alejandro Ibáñez
- Date of birth: 29 March 1995 (age 31)
- Place of birth: San Justo, Argentina
- Height: 1.74 m (5 ft 8 1/2 in)
- Position: Midfielder

Team information
- Current team: Argentino de Quilmes

Youth career
- San Lorenzo

Senior career*
Years	Team	Apps	(Gls)
2016–2017	San Lorenzo	0	(0)
2016–2017	→ Chacarita Juniors (loan)	33	(0)
2018	Olimpo	13	(0)
2019	Cafetaleros de Tapachula	6	(0)
2019–2020	All Boys	7	(0)
2020	→ Los Andes (loan)	9	(0)
2021	Cañuelas	12	(0)
2021–2022	Sarmiento de Resistencia	18	(0)
2022–	Argentino de Quilmes	6	(0)
- * Club domestic league appearances and goals as of 16:28, 7 August 2022 (UTC)

Daniel Alejandro Ibáñez (born 29 March 1995) is an Argentine professional footballer who plays as a midfielder for Argentino de Quilmes.

== Club career ==
Ibáñez's career began with Argentine Primera División side San Lorenzo. They loaned him out in August 2016 to Chacarita Juniors of Primera B Nacional, where he made a total of thirty-four appearances in the 2016–17 season which ended with promotion to the Primera División. He returned to San Lorenzo in July 2017, but departed the club permanently six months later to join fellow top-flight outfit Olimpo. His debut for Olimpo came against River Plate on 3 February 2018. Ibáñez was released on 26 December. In February 2019, Ibáñez was signed by Ascenso MX team Cafetaleros de Tapachula.

In July 2019, Ibáñez went back to his homeland with Primera B Nacional's All Boys. Six months later, after eight appearances, Ibáñez was loaned to Primera B Metropolitana with Los Andes.

== International career ==
Ibáñez was selected in the final squad by Humberto Grondona for the 2015 FIFA U-20 World Cup in New Zealand. However, he was an unused substitute for all three of Argentina's matches as they were eliminated at the group stage.

== Career statistics ==
As of 8 July 2020.

Club statistics
Club	Season	League			Cup		League Cup		Continental		Other		Total	
Club	Season	Division	Apps	Goals	Apps	Goals	Apps	Goals	Apps	Goals	Apps	Goals	Apps	Goals
San Lorenzo	2016–17	Primera División	0	0	0	0	—		0	0	0	0	0	0
San Lorenzo	2017–18	Primera División	0	0	0	0	—		0	0	0	0	0	0
San Lorenzo	Total		0	0	0	0	—		0	0	0	0	0	0
Chacarita Juniors (loan)	2016–17	Primera B Nacional	33	0	1	0	—		—		0	0	34	0
Olimpo	2017–18	Primera División	8	0	0	0	—		—		0	0	8	0
Olimpo	2018–19	Primera B Nacional	5	0	2	0	—		—		0	0	7	0
Olimpo	Total		13	0	2	0	—		—		0	0	15	0
Cafetaleros de Tapachula	2018–19	Ascenso MX	6	0	1	0	—		—		0	0	7	0
All Boys	2019–20	Primera B Nacional	7	0	1	0	—		—		0	0	8	0
Los Andes (loan)	2019–20	Primera B Metropolitana	6	0	0	0	—		—		0	0	6	0
Career total			60	0	4	0	—		0	0	0	0	65	0
