= Garcia Barbon Theatre =

Afundacion Vigo Theatre
- Teatro Afundación Vigo
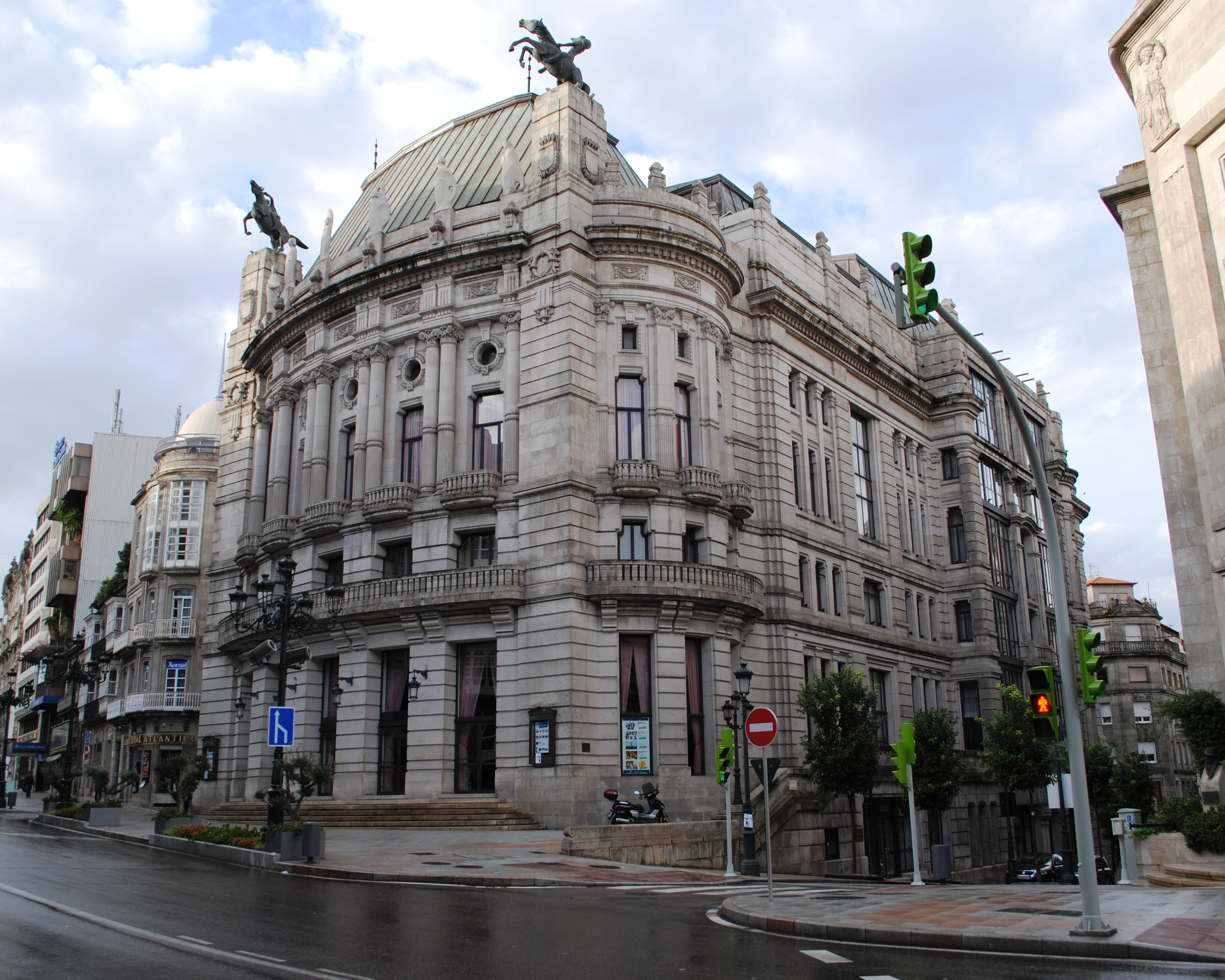
- Interactive map of the Afundacion Vigo Theatre area
- Former names: Rosalia de Castro Theatre
- Alternative names: Garcia Barbon Theatre

General information
- Type: Theatre and library
- Location: Vigo, Galicia, Spain
- Coordinates: 42°14′16.45″N 8°43′24.2″W
- Construction started: 1913
- Completed: 1927
- Opening: 1984
- Owner: Abanca
- Operator: Abanca

Design and construction
- Architects: Desiderio Pernas & Antonio Palacios

Website
- Official website

Garcia Barbon Theatre, also known as Afundacion Vigo Theatre (Galician: Teatro Afundación Vigo) for sponsorship reasons, is a 994-seat performing arts center in Vigo, Spain. Designed by Spanish architect Antonio Palacios, it was built in 1927 on the site formerly occupied by the Rosalia de Castro Theatre, destroyed by fire in 1910.

== History ==
=== Former building ===
The construction of the original theatre was funded by an enthusiastic group of locals who wanted to promote theatrical culture in the city. After years of economic problems, the theatre was opened on July 15, 1900, as "Rosalía de Castro Theatre" and its first performance was the opera Aida.

Years after its inauguration and after a period of economic difficulties, the theater went bankrupt. It was a store for a short period of time before popular support and benefactor José García Barbon recovered the property and returned it to play representations.

On February 8, 1910, after the function in Carnival Tuesday, a fire completely charred the building, leaving the city without a theater again. Three years later, thanks to José García Barbon's nieces who decided to continue the work of his uncle, the Galician architect Antonio Palacios was commissioned for the construction of the new theatre building. Described as Neo-Baroque, a mainstream style in the beginning of the twentieth century, it was inspired by the Paris Opera of Charles Garnier and the Arriaga Theatre of Bilbao.

=== New building ===
The new theatre was opened on April 23, 1927, under the name of Garcia Barbon theatre, but it was also an auditorium and Casino, where people can see different kinds of show and becoming a meeting point.

During the seventies the building was bought by "Caja de Ahorros Municipal de Vigo" a regional Savings Bank from the same city. This entity spent more than 6 million Euros in an important rehabilitation project done by the architect Desiderio Pernas, expanding the theatre, creating a library in a new top floor and giving a new image to the building.

On March 22 of 1984 the building was reopened as the “Centro Cultural Caixanova”. In the years that followed, the theatre’s official name changed depending on its owner: Novacaixagalicia, Novagalicia and finally Afundación, the latter under the patronage of Abanca.
