= Desirée de Fez =

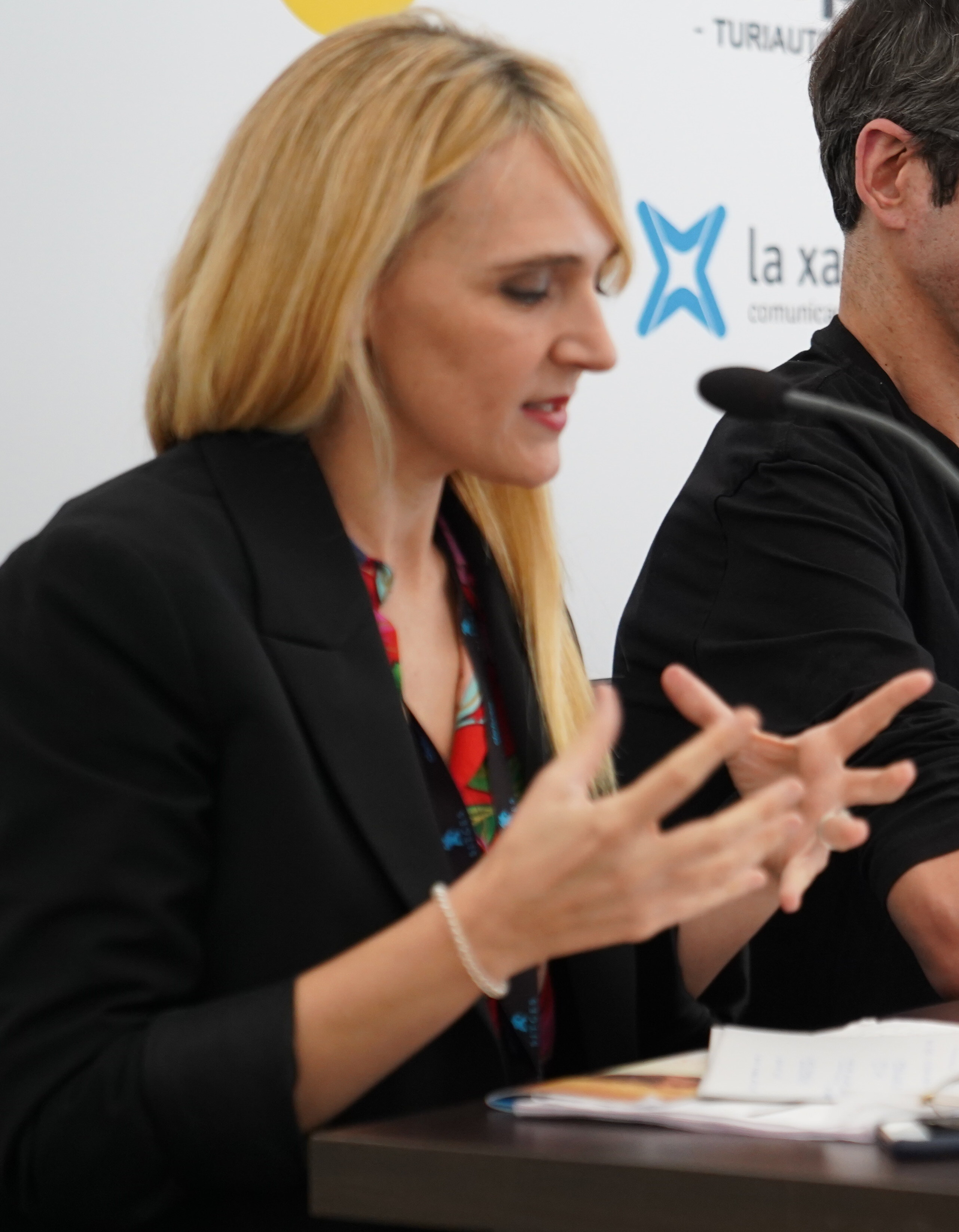
De Fez in 2019

Desirée de Fez (born 1977) is a Spanish film critic, programmer, writer and journalist primarily focused on horror fiction and fantasy. She has long collaborated as a consultant with the Sitges Film Festival.

== Life and career ==
Desirée de Fez was born in 1977 in Barcelona. She earned a licentiate degree in journalism from the University Ramon Llull. She collaborated with El Periódico de Catalunya and Catalunya Ràdio (La finestra indiscreta) and La 2 (Página Dos). She has also reviewed films in Fotogramas and Rockdelux. Her essay book Reina del grito about horror fiction and women was published by Blackie Books in 2020. She created the podcast Reinas del grito featuring conversations with Laura Fernández, Isabel Coixet, Carlota Pereda, Carla Simón, Sara Mesa, Pilar Pedraza and Mariana Enríquez. Her debut novel No la dejes sola (2026), dealing in terms of humour and body horror about a mother and two sisters, was also published by Blackie Books.
