= María Zamora (producer) =

Spanish film producer

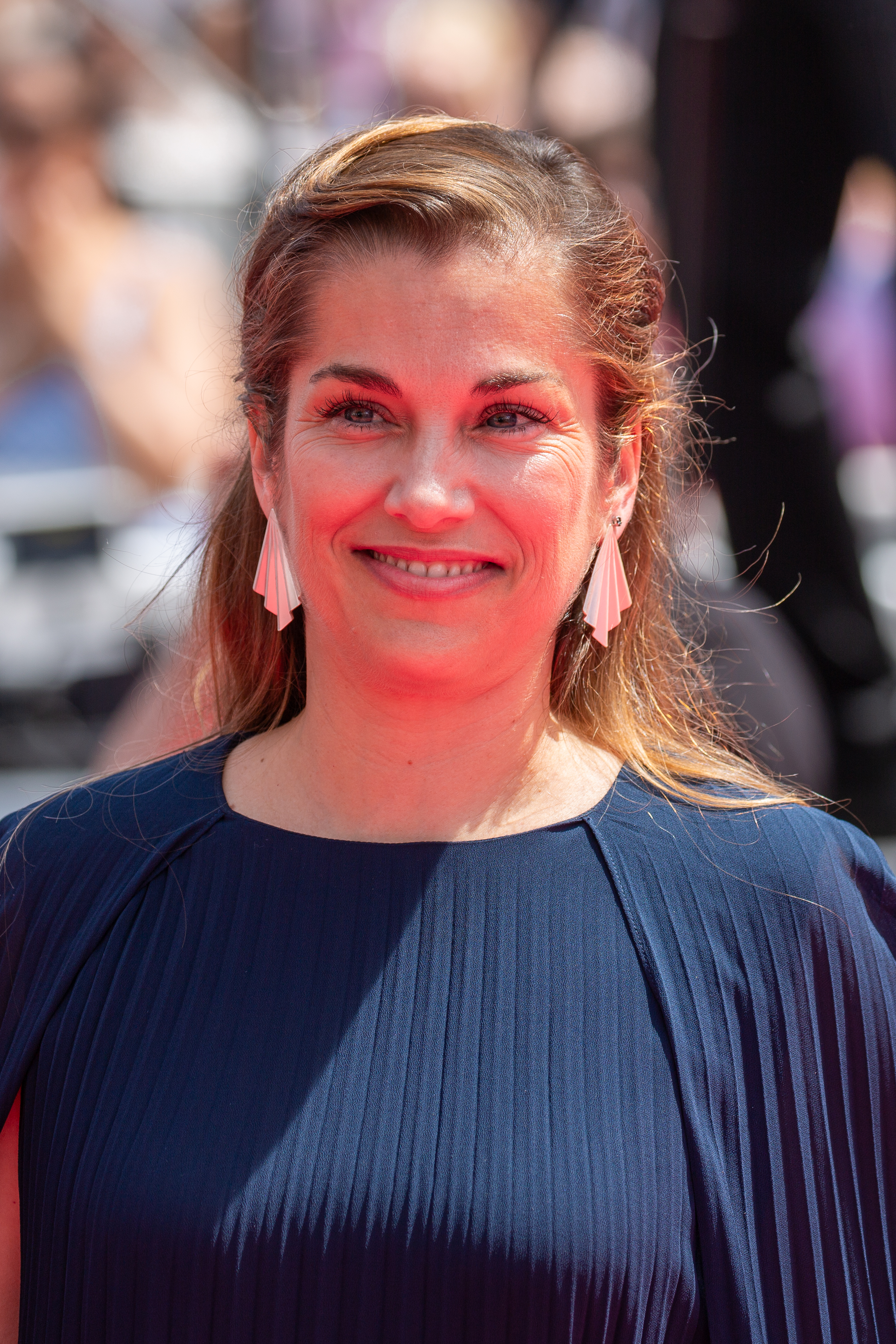
Zamora in 2025.

María Zamora (born 1976) is a Spanish film producer.

Born in Valencia, Zamora earned a licentiate degree on Business Administration & Management from the University of Valencia. After completing a master's degree on audivisual production, she moved to Madrid to work for Avalon Productions, later Avalon PC. In 2021, she founded production and distribution company Elastica Films along with Enrique Costa. She has produced films such as Mapa, They Are All Dead, María (and Everybody Else), The Days to Come, My Mexican Bretzel, Amar, Libertad, Summer 1993, Alcarràs, and The Rye Horn. In 2024, the Spanish Ministry of Culture awarded her the National Cinematography Prize.
