= Carlo Padial =

Spanish comics artist, writer, screenwriter and film director (born 1977)

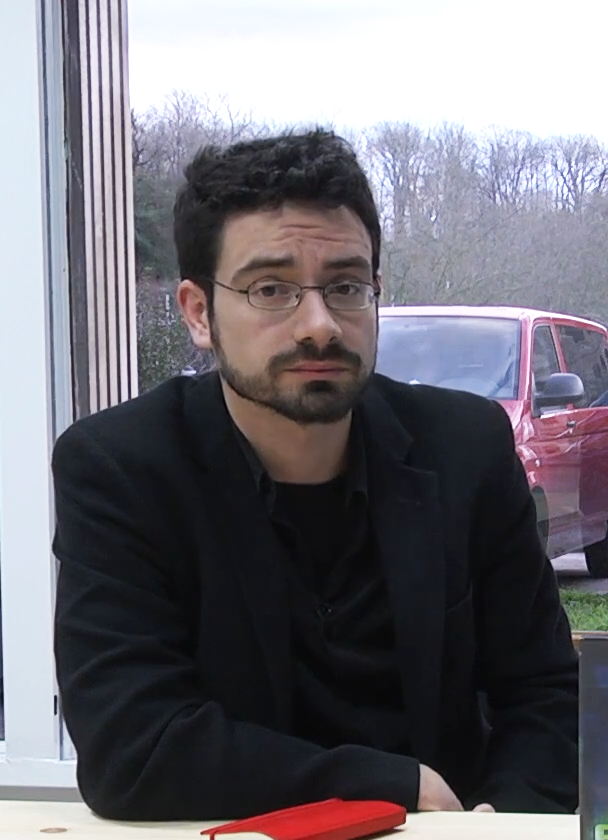
- Padial in 2014
- Born: Carlos Padial García; 27 August 1977 (age 48); Barcelona, Catalonia, Spain
- Other names: Carlo Hart; Carlos de Diego
- Education: Escola Massana
- Occupations: Comics artist; writer; screenwriter; film director

Carlos Padial García (born 27 August 1977), known professionally as Carlo Padial, is a comics artist, writer, screenwriter and film director.

In 2011 he wrote Dinero gratis, and Erasmus, Orgasmus y otros problemas. In 2017 he directed the comedy film Algo muy gordo, starring Berto Romero. It was analyzed as the end of the comedy. In 2018 he shot the documentary film Bocadillo, starring Wismichu. He directed Vosotros sois mi película, which was released on Flooxer.

== Filmography ==
=== Films ===
- Vosotros sois mi película (2019)
- Something Huge (2017)
- Taller Capuchoc (2014)
- Mi loco Erasmus (2012)

=== TV series ===
- Més dinamita (2010)

Books

- Contenido (2023)
