= Professionalism in women's association football =

History of women's sport professionalization

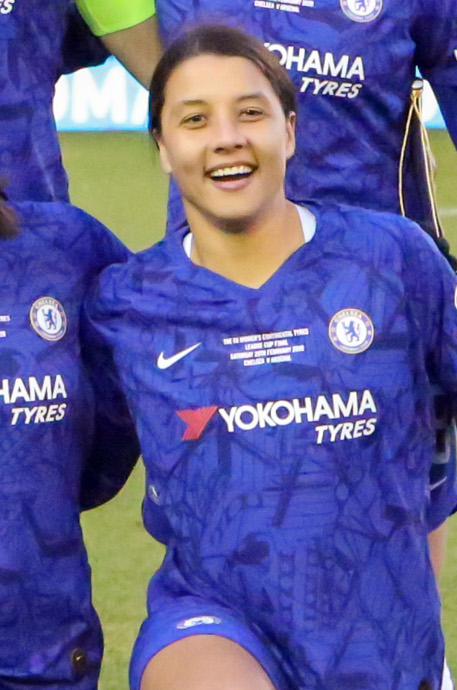
Sam Kerr is reportedly one of the highest-paid professional women's association footballers in the world, earning more than US$500,000 per year as of 14 March 2023. When she played in the NWSL in 2013, the maximum allowed salary was $30,000.

Like men's association football, women's football had amateur origins, but faced bans in several nations that slowed its growth and professionalization compared to professionalism in the men's sport. Growth in the women's league game intensified since the end of the 20th century alongside the profile of the FIFA Women's World Cup introduced in 1991.

== History ==
=== Early fundraising successes ===
Dick, Kerr Ladies F.C., an early women's football club in Preston, Lancashire, England, were closely associated with charitable causes during World War I and the interwar period. As demand for coal dropped after the war, coal-mining communities in England faced disputes with increasingly privatized mining companies that led to miners organizing their labour. During a wage dispute between miners and mine owners, the owners locked miners out in Wigan and Leigh on 1 April 1921, and the charitable success of Dick, Kerr Ladies inspired the formation of women's football clubs that began playing matches in May 1921 to raise funds for distress relief. This included matches to fund soup kitchens for locked-out miners, leading to some of these matches being named "pea soup" matches. Fundraising games for distress funds continued after the end of the miners' dispute in June 1921.

Despite being more popular than some men's football events — one match saw a 53,000 strong crowd — The Football Association (The FA) prohibited women's football from association members' pitches in December 1921, with the FA stating that "the game of football is quite unsuitable for females and ought not to be encouraged" and citing in part complaints about "the appropriation of the receipts to other than charitable objects" in its rationale.

Players and football writers have argued that this ban was due to envy of the large crowds that women's matches attracted, and because the FA had no control over the money made from the women's game. Dick, Kerr Ladies player Alice Barlow said, "we could only put it down to jealousy. We were more popular than the men and our bigger gates were for charity".

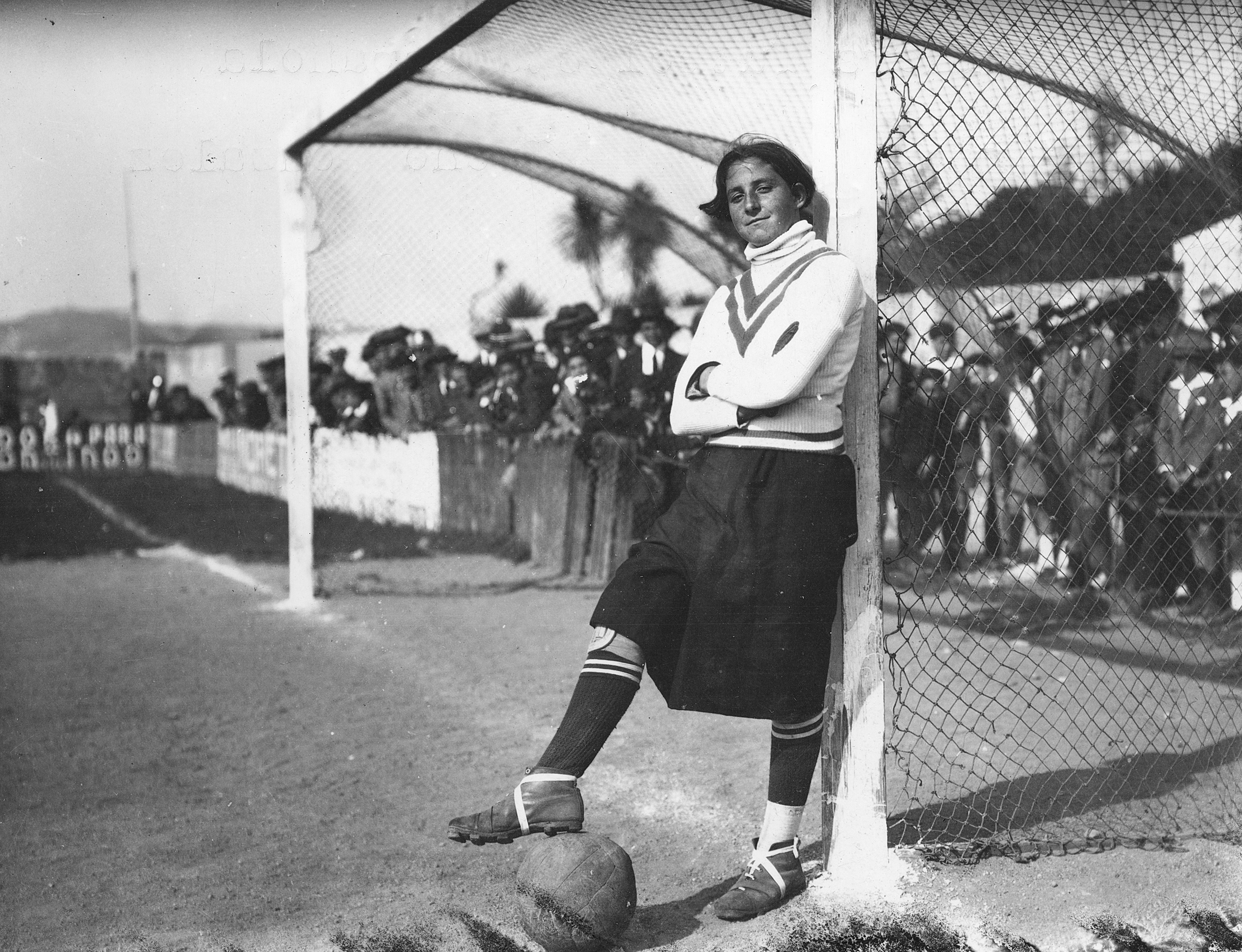
Irene González organized and played in professional football matches from 1925 to 1927.

In 1925, Spanish footballer Irene González of A Coruña founded her own club and charged money to play matches during tours of Galicia and in tournaments that she organized. While González was the only woman on her team, she has been credited as the first woman to professionally play football.

=== Era of bans ===
The FA's ban, which lasted from 1921 to around 1971, inspired or coincided with other bans of women's football in Europe over a similar span, some of which did not end until UEFA required European national associations to incorporate the women's sport. Bans sometimes also coincided with political change, such as bans in Francoist Spain beginning in 1936 and ending after the Spanish transition to democracy in the late 1970s.

Bans were not limited to Europe, with nations under the British Empire, including Australia and Canada, following the FA's ban, and nations such as Brazil and Nigeria also banning the sport for decades during the 20th century.

Simon Kuper and economist Stefan Szymanski, authors of Soccernomics, have argued women's football wasn't just "some potential untapped market, but a business sector that was regularly selling tens of thousands of match tickets. These revenues would surely have grown over time, as men's revenues did." Even after bans were lifted, investment in women's football was reduced to levels relatively lower than before them. Such factors have contributed to the relatively slow professionalization of the sport, with full professionalization coming to England's Women's Super League in 2018, more than 110 years after the men's game initially professionalized.

=== Post-ban era ===
Most bans of the sport were lifted by the 1970s. During the 1970s, Italy became the first country to have professional women's football players on a part-time basis. Italy was also the first country to import foreign footballers from other European countries, which raised the profile of the league. Players during that era included Susanne Augustesen (Denmark), Rose Reilly and Edna Neillis (Scotland), Anne O'Brien (Ireland) and Concepcion Sánchez Freire (Spain).

In 1970, the Torino-based Federation of Independent European Female Football (FIEFF) ran the 1970 Women's World Cup in Italy without the involvement of FIFA. In the finals of the 1971 Women's World Cup, hosted by Mexico and played at Estadio Azteca in front of an estimated 110,000 or 112,500 attendees, the Mexican team protested their lack of pay in the face of the tournament's profits from ticket sales, television revenues, and merchandising, and threatened to boycott the match. After the 1971 cup, FIFA forbade the Mexican Football Federation from organizing further women's tournaments. In 1975, Jamaican forward Beverly Ranger received enough sponsorship while playing in Germany to make a living off the sport, a first for a woman in Germany.

The first professional league for women's football would not start until Sweden's semi-professional Damallsvenskan in 1988, three years prior to the first FIFA-sanctioned Women's World Cup. The first fully professional league, the United States' Women's United Soccer Association, launched in 2001 after the United States women's national soccer team's victory over China in the 1999 FIFA Women's World Cup raised unprecedented levels of interest in the sport.

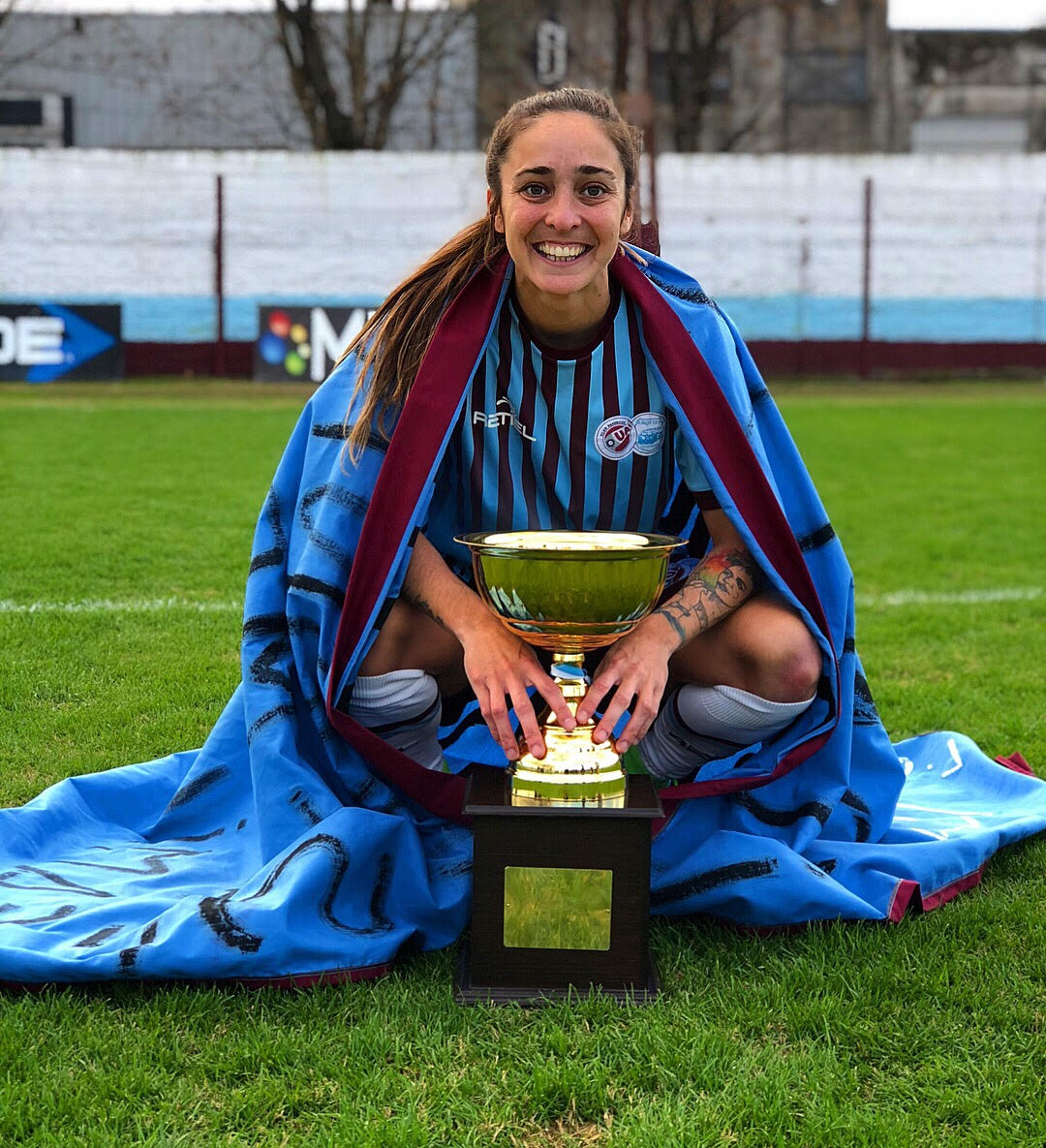
Macarena Sánchez's lawsuit led to the start of professionalization for Argentina's Primera División A.

=== Labor disputes ===
Professionalization of women's football has at times been the subject of organized labor action or legal intervention. For example, Argentinian player-activist Macarena Sánchez led efforts to professionalize the nation's club league Primera División A, but was released by her team UAI Urquiza in January 2019 under terms that prevented her from signing with a new team. She in turn sued UAI Urquiza and the Argentine Football Association (AFA), alleging discrimination where professional women's players were wrongly treated as amateurs. The AFA announced in March that it had agreed with the footballers' union Futbolistas Argentinos Agremiados to support professionalizing the women's league. Three months after her lawsuit, Sánchez was one of fifteen players who joined San Lorenzo on a professional contract, a historic first for Argentine women's football.

Negotiations, and in some cases strikes, led to collective bargaining agreements between players and clubs toward professionalization in several nations, including Australia and Spain, and also among women's football referees in the United States and Spain. In some nations, legal reforms also helped facilitate professionalization, such as in Chile, Denmark, Italy, and Spain.

== Timeline by nation ==
This table details the year in which professionalism was systematically introduced to women's football, by nation. Some nations might have had individual professional women's footballers before these dates but lacked professionalization organized at the club level or higher.

Initial professionalization of women's football, by nation
Nation	Year	Notes	Ref.
Italy	1970	Clubs in Italy signed players to professional contracts, including international transfers, as early as 1970, though some early contracts were limited to recouping expenses. Legal reforms in 2019 inspired by the national team's success at the 2019 FIFA Women's World Cup allowed the women's Serie A to professionalize, and in 2022 it became the country's first fully professional women's football league.	
Brazil	1982	EC Radar was the first club in Brazil known to pay wages to players following the end of bans against women's football in 1979, though not all players were paid and wages were near national minimums. The Brasileirão Feminino, founded in 2013, is the nation's first professional women's football league, and became fully professional in 2019.	
Sweden	1988	The Damallsvenskan is the oldest active professional women's football league, though it has been primarily semi-professional with a few fully professional teams.	
Germany	1990	The Frauen-Bundesliga is Germany's first professional women's football league, though as of 2022 it remains semi-professional with a few fully professional teams.	
Nigeria	1992	The government-funded NWFL Premiership paid wages to players that, as of 2001, were between US$50 and US$300 per month.	
Denmark	1997	Denmark legalized professionalism in women's football in 1997 and initially restricted it to the Danish Women's League.	
England	2000	Fulham L.F.C. fully professionalized in 2000, but without a fully professional league dropped to semi-professional status after 2003 and dissolved in 2010. The Women's Super League launched in 2011 is the nation's first professional women's football league, developed ahead of the 2012 Summer Olympics hosted in London and inaugurated around the 2011 FIFA Women's World Cup. It restructured to become fully professional in 2018, making it the only fully professional league in Europe at the time.	
United States	2001	The Women's United Soccer Association was the world's first fully professional women's football league, and directly followed the nation's success at the US-hosted 1999 FIFA Women's World Cup. Now defunct, it was followed by the also defunct Women's Professional Soccer and the active National Women's Soccer League.	
Japan	2005	After gaining a title sponsor in 2004, players signed contracts with clubs in the Nadeshiko League's top two divisions in 2005 and 2006 but remained largely semi-professional. The WE League, which began play in 2021, is the nation's first fully professional women's football league.	
Australia	2008	The A-League Women was founded as the semi-professional W-League after the 2007 FIFA Women's World Cup. The league moved to a more professionalized league structure in 2021 with plans for full professionalization, and Australia and New Zealand, which also has a team in the league, are hosts of the 2023 FIFA Women's World Cup.	
France	2009	Division 1 Féminine, launched in 1992, began professionalization with the 2009–10 season. In 2023, the French Football Federation added plans to fully professionalize the league by 2024.	
South Africa	2009	The SAFA Women's League introduced professionalization in 2009, though as of 11 September 2022 it was not fully professional.	
Spain	2015	FC Barcelona Femení professionalized in 2015. In 2021, Women's Primera División was the first women's league of any sport granted professional status by Spain's Consejo Superior de Deportes, and was succeeded by the fully professional Liga F in 2022.	
China	2015	The Chinese Women's Super League relaunched as a professionalizing league in 2015 and became fully professional in 2016.	
India	2017	The Indian Women's League is the nation's first professional women's football league.	
Mexico	2017	Liga MX Femenil followed an unsuccessful effort to professionalize its predecessor, Liga Mexicana de Fútbol Femenil, in 2007. Liga MX Femenil removed a $750/month salary cap in 2019 and allowed teams to become fully professional, though not all of the league's players are fully professionalized, and in 2021 the Mexican Football Federation implemented reforms to prevent illegal collusion to suppress wages.	
Argentina	2019	The Campeonato de Fútbol Femenino, founded in 1991, began professionalization in 2019.	
Costa Rica	2019	Deportivo Saprissa's women's football section professionalized in 2018, though, in 2025 the team disappeared do to a lack of a professional league. Alajuelense Fútbol Femenino, a team in the Costa Rican Women's Premier Division, professionalized in 2019 starting with the signing of Shirley Cruz. Another team, CS Herediano professionalized its women’s football section in 2020, but the team was dissolved in 2023 do to a lack of support of women's football from the Federación Costarricense de Fútbol	
Greece	2021	Aris Thessaloniki F.C.'s women's football side announced in August 2021 its professionalization within A Division.	
Chile	2022	The Chamber of Deputies of Chile approved legal reforms professionalizing women's football, mandating that at least half of each top-division club's players must be under contract with at least a federal minimum wage in 2022, and every player by 2025.	
Scotland	2022	The Scottish Women's Football League was restructured in 2022 toward professionalization.	
Republic of Ireland	2023	The League of Ireland Women's Premier Division introduced professional contracts in December 2022 and began play in 2023, ahead of the 2023 FIFA Women's World Cup.	
Wales	2023	Wrexham A.F.C. Women announced in February 2023 their intent to become the first semi-professional team in the amateur Adran Premier.	
Pending
Canada	2025	Former player Diana Matheson co-founded a professional women's football league, the nation's first, in December 2022 with intent to play in 2025.	

Glossary:

Professionalized
Clubs, leagues, or legal reforms introduce professional contracts for players.
Semi-professional
Players are financially compensated for play, but are employed only part-time.
Professional
At least some players in a club or league are financially compensated, full-time footballers.
Fully professional
All players in a club or league are full-time professional footballers.

== See also ==
- List of most expensive women's association football transfers
- Labour relations in women's association football
