= The Goldsmith's Secret =

- Theatrical release poster
- Spanish: El secreto del orfebre
- Directed by: Olga Osorio
- Written by: Olga Osorio
- Based on: El secreto del orfebre by Elia Barceló
- Produced by: Adrián Guerra; Núria Valls
- Starring: Mario Casas; Michelle Jenner; Zoe Bonafonte; Enzo Oliver
- Cinematography: Marc Miró
- Edited by: Lourdes Rodríguez
- Music by: Lau Nau
- Production companies: Nostromo Pictures; El Secreto del Orfebre AIE
- Distributed by: Warner Bros. Pictures
- Release date: 28 February 2025
- Running time: 99 minutes
- Country: Spain
- Language: Spanish

The Goldsmith's Secret (Spanish: El secreto del orfebre) is a 2025 Spanish romantic drama film written and directed by Olga Osorio based on the novel by Elia Barceló. Starring Mario Casas and Michelle Jenner alongside Zoe Bonafonte and Enzo Oliver, it explores a romance that transcends time.

== Plot ==
The plot takes place in between the 1950s, the 1970s, and 1999. Upon returning to his hometown in northern Spain, renowned jewelry designer Juan Pablo remembers an intense past romancer with Celia, a woman twenty years his senior.

== Cast ==
- Mario Casas as Juan Pablo
- Michelle Jenner as Celia
- Enzo Oliver as Juan Pablo
- Zoe Bonafonte as Celia

== Production ==
The Goldsmith's Secret is an adaptation of the novel El secreto del orfebre by Elia Barceló. Director-writer Osorio also acknowledged In the Mood for Love as an influence. Other crew responsibilities were entrusted to Marc Miró (cinematography), Anna Pujol (art direction), Alberto Valcárcel (costume design), and Lau Nau (music). The film is a Nostromo Pictures (Adrián Guerra, Núria Valls) production, and it had the participation of Movistar Plus+ and backing from ICEC. Shooting locations included Elciego.

== Release ==
The film was released theatrically in Spain by Warner Bros. Pictures on 28 February 2025. For its international premiere in April 2025, it made it to the programme of the Miami Film Festival.

== See also ==
- List of Spanish films of 2025
