= B.A.S.I.C. (Alpinestars album) =

Studio album by Alpinestars
- Released: Sep 18, 2000
- Genre: Electronica
- Length: 51:15
- Label: Guidance Recordings
- Producer: Glyn Thomas, Richard Woolgar

Alpinestars chronology
B.A.S.I.C. (2000)	White Noise (2002)

Professional ratings
Review scores
Source	Rating
Allmusic	3/5 stars

B.A.S.I.C. is an album composed by the music group Alpinestars, released in 2000.

== Track listing ==
All compositions from Thomas and Woolgar except where noted.

1. "Jump Jet" – 2:52
2. "77 Sunset Strip" – 4:28
3. "Hyper Hyper" – 4:31
4. "Keep It Coming" – 3:16
5. "You Rescue" (Butler, Thomas, Woolgar) – 3:22
6. "Interlaken" – 5:40
7. "Arianne" – 4:54
8. "Green Raven Blonde" – 3:04
9. "Cresta La Wave" – 5:09
10. "Size 9" – 5:25
11. "V.T.O.L." – 1:51
12. "Complete Control" – 6:35

== Personnel ==
- Neil Claxton – mixing
- Glyn Thomas – producer, mixing
- Richard Woolgar – producer, mixing
