= Nuspirit Helsinki (album) =

Studio album by Nuspirit Helsinki
- Released: 30 April 2002
- Genre: Acid Jazz / nu-jazz
- Label: Guidance Recordings

Nuspirit Helsinki chronology
Nuspirit Helsinki (2002)	Our Favorite Things (2008)

Professional ratings
Review scores
Source	Rating
Allmusic	link

Nuspirit Helsinki is the self-titled debut from Nuspirit Helsinki.

== Track listing ==
1. Honest – 3:59
2. Subzero – 5:58
3. Trying – 7:29
4. Silent Steps – 4:27
5. Circular Motion – 7:24
6. Hard Like a Rock (Nuspirit Emorph) – 6:33
7. String Interlude – 0:48
8. Orson (Album Mix) – 6:33
9. I Wonder (2:14 AM) – 4:50
10. Montana Roja – 0:36
11. Seis Por Ocho (Original Jazz Session Mix) – 6:14
12. Skydive – 10:03
13. Skydive Outro – 0:47
