= Women's football in Spain =

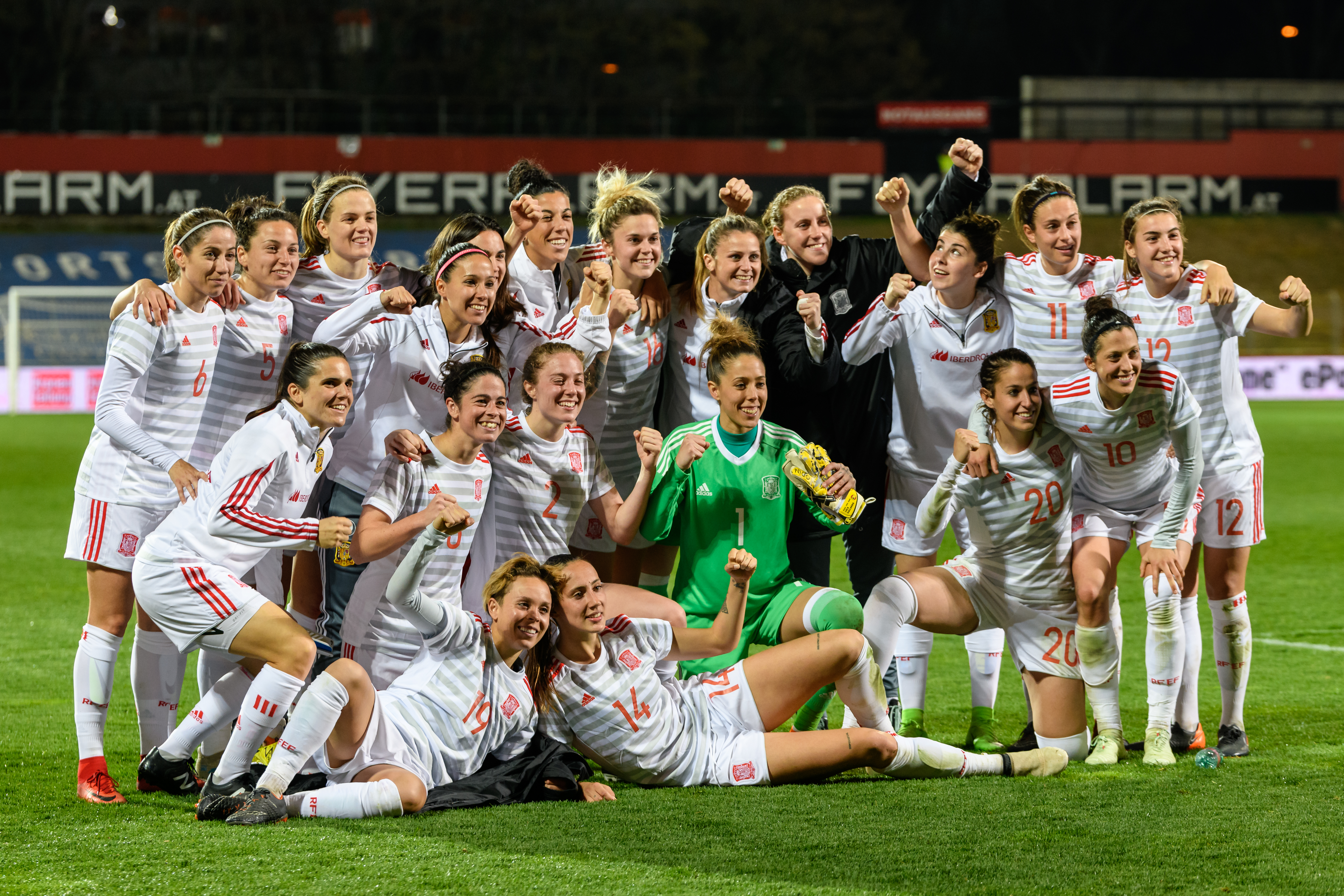
- Spain at the 2019 World Cup qualifiers
- Country: Spain
- Governing body: Royal Spanish Football Federation
- National team: Spain

National competitions
- Primera División; Primera Federación; Segunda Federación; Primera Nacional; Regional leagues

Club competitions
- Copa de la Reina; Supercopa de España Femenina

International competitions
- Champions League; FIFA Women's World Cup (national team); European Championship (national team); Olympics (national team)

Audience records
- Single match: 91,648 (for a Spanish club; at a Spanish venue (Note: Barcelona vs Wolfsburg at the Camp Nou on 22 April 2022. The FIFA-recognised world record attendance for any women's football match.)); 75,784 (national team (Note: 2023 FIFA Women's World Cup final, in Australia.)); 60,739 (domestic league (Note: Atlético Madrid vs. Barcelona at the Metropolitano Stadium on 17 March 2019. The world record attendance for a women's domestic league match.))

Women's football in Spain is governed by the Royal Spanish Football Federation. Currently there are two national competitions, the Liga F and the Copa de la Reina – which also feed into the Supercopa de España Femenina – in the professional club involved structure.

== History ==
=== Early history: 1910s–1930s ===
Women's football was recorded as being played in Spain as early as the 1910s. The first known women's football teams in Spain were founded in Barcelona in 1914, inspired by teams playing in England. A small football association, the Spanish Girl's Club, was set up and sponsored two teams, Montserrat and Giralda. They played their first match on 9 June 1914; both teams were initially coached by Jack Greenwell when he was also player-coach of FC Barcelona men's team, and then by Paco Bru. Despite becoming popular and playing well enough that one sports paper said they would soon be able to compete with men's second or youth teams, the teams did not last long. Their fortunes seemed to rest on a planned tour of France to play women's teams there, which was cancelled due to the outbreak of World War I, and Spanish Girl's Club stopped playing. Local newspapers continued to report on the women's teams in England, and suggested that women's football would soon reach Spain, but sportsmen and sport advocates in Spain espoused the belief that it was too dangerous or masculine.

In 1920, there was report of a football match between women's teams in Irun, albeit advertised by the skimpy kits the players would wear, setting the tone for press coverage during the decade. Some women in the 1920s found success playing in men's teams: teenage goalkeeper Irene González competed for minutes with Rodrigo García Vizoso, while Ana Carmona Ruiz dressed as a man to join teams. There was also an international women's match between a French XI and British XI held in Barcelona in 1923, and "one of the most important clubs" in Barcelona started a women's team this year, before Belgian women's teams toured Spain in 1925. (Note: Following the England FA ban on women's football, Albert(o) Maluquer, historian of FC Barcelona, agreed with England's assessment that the female constitution could not handle football. However, Maluquer felt he could not object to it "as a result of the creation of a women's team in Barcelona, in one of the most important clubs in the city". (Torrebadella-Flix, 2016. p. 318)) However, the press was resistant to women's football: some exhibition games were played but were not treated seriously, and the desire for women's football caused media to make news of how masculine it was, while promoting the new English sport of netball in favour.

The outlook was more positive in the early 1930s, in conjunction with the growth of women's rights in the Second Spanish Republic, seeing high participation of women in sports. Several clubs that played football, among other sports, were founded during the decade, including Club Femení i d'Esports de Barcelona and Sección femenina de Hockey del Athletic Club de Madrid. In 1932, another association was created, this time in Valencia, for women's teams to play each other and develop the sport. It quickly sponsored four professional teams – Levante, España, Atlético and Valencia – which toured Spain and Latin America, while FC Barcelona added Ana María Martínez Sagi, who believed in feminism through sports, to its board of directors in 1934. The arrival of the Spanish Civil War effectively shut women out of football.

=== Franco dictatorship ban ===
==== 1930s–1970: Active marginalisation ====
Between the 1930s and 1975, during the Franco regime, women were forbidden from playing football. The Sección Femenina, a fascist pro-misogyny political advocacy group, was incorporated into the dictatorship during the regime, suppressing women's rights. The regime also suppressed lesbians. This ironically encouraged the growth of women's football in Barcelona, as a means of community-building, and several teams thrived; by 1970, in Spain, women's football teams were playing unacknowledged competitive matches and reportedly played "extremely well".

As the regime weakened in the late 1960s, women began returning to football across Spain, with the Sección Femenina actively spreading disinformation and officially banning the promotion of anything related to women's football to try and prevent this. Women began practicing athletics in Spain in 1960, when female relatives of male athletes began using the facilities at Montjuïc in Barcelona and, facing pushback, sought legal advice to say that as Barcelona citizens they could use any sports facility in the city; a decade later, Mundo Deportivo wrote that this set a precedent for women to play football, as the ban, something the Royal Spanish Football Federation (RFEF) took as a given, was probably not legal. The newspaper suggested that it would be reasonable for women's football to be brought under RFEF control rather than develop at its own pace.

==== 1970–1980: Early prominence ====
Women's football in Spain took on a new popularity from 1969. A decade later, Mundo Deportivo attributed the "launch" of competitive women's football in Spain to the first Fuengirola Trophy in Fuengirola, organised by a liquor company in 1970. The newspaper described women's football as an overnight sensation; like the Fuengirola Trophy, most competitions were supported by advertising money.

There was no institutional support, despite the Spanish Football Federation not having any regulations prohibiting women's football. When UEFA polled its members in 1970, Spain was one of five that declined to provide information on women's football. At the time, there were many women's teams regularly training in Catalonia, where there was publicity, and about 20 in Biscay and Gipuzkoa of the Basque Country, where women's football in Spain was most developed. Women's matches had halves of half an hour. The popularity continued to grow. In 1970, Barcelona Femení played to 60,000 at Camp Nou, in a double-header with the men's team, then to 40,000 in a Barcelona derby match in 1971. The first domestic women's league in Spain was played in 1971–72, featuring teams in Catalonia. Victoria Hernández then became the first female footballer to sign a "professional" contract – one stipulating remuneration per game played – in 1971, and several players were good enough to join teams in other European countries with better-developed women's football culture.

Following the initial growth in prominence, the government department Educación y Descanso, which managed recreation, took over the organisation of women's football. Though competition still took place, Catalan women's football under Educación y Descanso was described as "hidden, clandestine, silent." In 1979, there were only six women's football teams in Catalonia – two of which pertained to FC Barcelona, and were the only ones with any tangible support. María Teresa Andreu, the main advocate for women's football in Spain at the time, said that the Catalan Football Federation had indicated support for enfranchising women's football, but were ignored when taking the proposal to Madrid.

=== Federation recognition: 1980s– ===
The RFEF recognised women's football in 1980, but did not organise their own national league until 1988. In 2019 the Spanish FA committed to spending $20 million in the area of women's football.

== National team ==
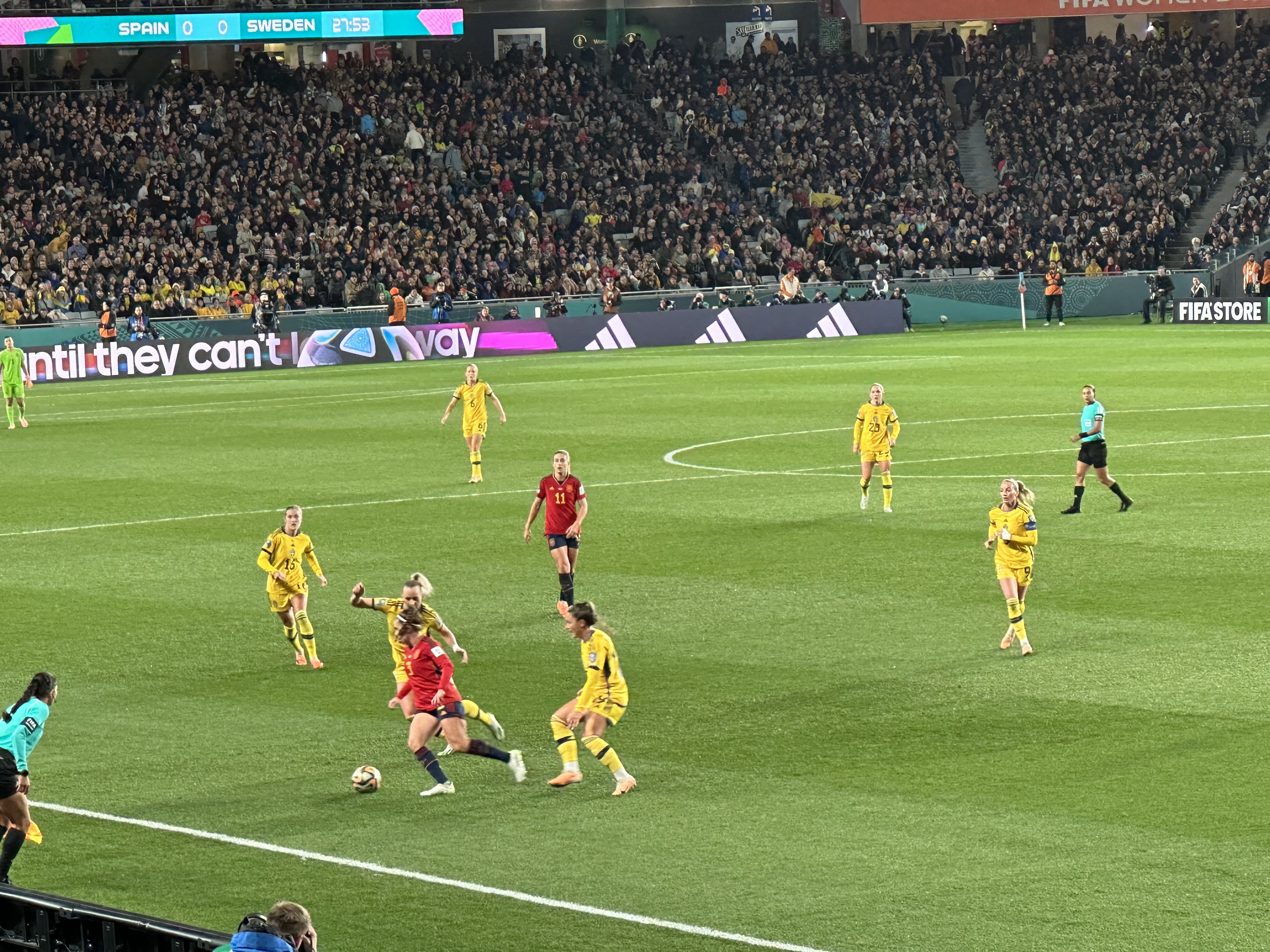
Spain with the ball in the 2023 World Cup semifinal against Sweden

The Spain national football team has qualified three times for the FIFA World Cup, for the first time in 2015 and every World Cup since then. They qualified three times for the UEFA European Championship. Prior to winning the 2023 World Cup, the furthest the senior national team reached at international competition was the semi-finals at UEFA Euro 1997.

The U-17 national team won the U-17 European Championship in 2010, 2011, 2015, and 2018, as well as becoming champions at the 2018 and 2022 U-17 World Cups, and finalists in the 2014 U-17 World Cup.

The U-19 national team won the UEFA U-19 European Championship in 2004, 2017, 2018, 2022, and 2023.

The U-20 national team were runner-ups at the 2018 U-20 World Cup and then champions at the 2022 U-20 World Cup.

Spain's greatest achievement was winning the 2023 World Cup. Olga Carmona scored the winning goal in the final as captain of the team. Spain became the first women's team to hold three World Cups (senior, under-20, and under-17) simultaneously. Salma Paralluelo played in all three of those tournaments. Spain were also leading goalscorers in the tournament with 18 goals.

Spain became a top 10 team in the FIFA World Rankings for the first time in 2021. Spanish players won all categories of the 2021 UEFA awards, the first time all from one nation. The winners were Alexia Putellas, Sandra Paños, Irene Paredes, and Jennifer Hermoso. In December 2023 after their success in the Nations League, Spain became the number one ranked team in the world.

== National competition ==
The first teams and the first informal women's football competitions in Spain emerged in the 1970s, although they were not officially recognized by the Royal Spanish Football Federation until 1980, with the founding of the National Women's Football Committee. The first official national competition was the Copa de la Reina, established in 1983. The women's national league began competition in the 1988-89 season.

Primera División is the national competition for female football players in Spain.

Below the Primera División, there is a second tier called Primera Federación, where its teams are divided into seven groups. In 2020 Primera Federación teams became full time professionals.

The lower tiers are administered by the regional federations.

Level	League
	Professional league
1	Liga F (Liga F); 16 teams
	↓↑ 2 teams
2	Primera Federación; 14 teams
	↓↑ 4 teams
3	Segunda Federación; 42 teams divided into 3 groups
	↓↑ 6 teams
4	Tercera Federación; 18 groups, 12 teams each
5	Regional leagues

== See also ==
- Spain women's national football team
- List of Spain women's international footballers
- Football in Spain
- List of foreign Liga F players
- Rubiales affair
