= Flow Festival =

Annual music festival in Helsinki, Finland

- Genre: Music festival, arts festival
- Dates: First half of August
- Locations: Helsinki, Finland
- Years active: 2004–19, 2022-
- Founders: Tuomas Kallio, Nuspirit Helsinki
- Website: www.flowfestival.com

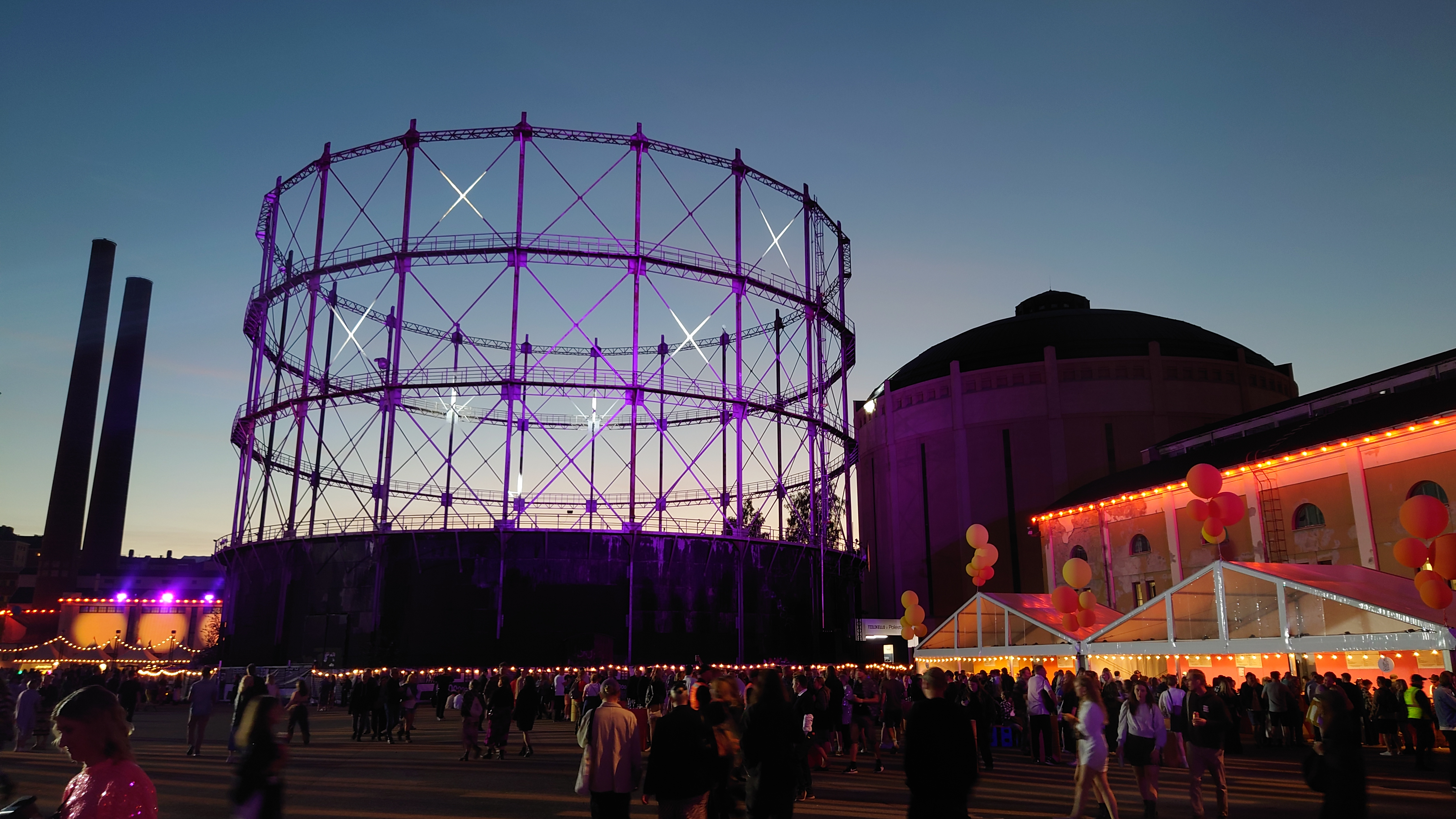
Flow Festival 2023 in Helsinki. Converted gas holders in the background now function as cultural arenas in the former industrial area of Suvilahti.

Flow Festival (commonly known simply as Flow) is an urban music and arts festival in Helsinki, Finland.

The music presented at Flow Festival is a varied selection of artists from indie rock to soul and jazz and from folk to contemporary club sounds – from both the Finnish and the international scene. In addition to music, Flow Festival is about urban spaces, visual arts, film screenings, talks, design as well as food and drinks. The event takes place at a defunct Suvilahti power plant and its industrial surroundings in downtown Helsinki's immediate vicinity.

The festival showcases established musical artists but is also known for giving the stage for new and emerging artists. Notable artist appearances at Flow Festival over the years have included artists such as Iggy Pop, Nick Cave & The Bad Seeds, Kanye West, Lana Del Rey, Lily Allen, The Roots, The Black Keys, Beach House, Kraftwerk, Björk, M.I.A., Bon Iver, Alicia Keys, Kendrick Lamar, Public Enemy, Cat Power, The National, Outkast, Action Bronson, Manic Street Preachers, Vampire Weekend, Iron & Wine, My Bloody Valentine and Lykke Li.

In 2018, the festival gathered 84,000 visitors. The line-up consisted of more than 140 artists.

Flow Festival 2020 and 2021 were cancelled due to the COVID-19 pandemic. The most recent Flow Festival took place from 8 to 10 August 2025.

The festival is owned by the British firm Superstruct Entertainment, which was acquired in 2024 by the American private-equity firm Kohlberg Kravis Roberts (KKR).

== History ==
Flow Festival was created by the Finnish music producer Tuomas Kallio and his friends from the Helsinki-based music collective Nuspirit Helsinki. The organizers' goal was to offer something new to the Finnish music and urban scene. Since 2004, Flow Festival has been organized annually during the first weeks of August.

During its history of over 10 years, Flow Festival has been organized in three different locations. The event has grown from a soul & jazz club event into a Northern European music and arts festival with an international interest.

=== 2004 ===
Starting under the Flow, the inaugural festival consisted of two nights at an indoor club in the now destroyed VR warehouses in downtown Helsinki with a capacity of around 2000.

The inaugural event's line-up was heavily focused on jazz and soul. Performances included those of Marlena Shaw, Ty, Nuspirit Helsinki, The Five Corners Quintet, Norman Jay, Jazzanova, Bugz in the Attic and Nicola Conte.

=== 2005 ===
In its second year, the line-up artists of Flow Festival 2005 included Omar, Husky Rescue, Marva Whitney and Mark Murphy.

=== 2006 ===
The third festival in order, Flow Festival 2006 moved northwards from downtown Helsinki to Kaikukatu in Sörnäinen. The line-up included José González, Gravenhurst, Candi Staton, TV-Resistori and Aavikko.

=== 2007 ===
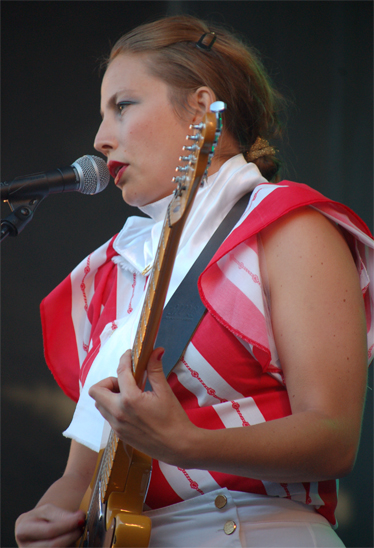
Jenny Wilson performing 2007.

In 2007, the festival changed its official name to the current form of Flow Festival. The event also moved to its current location in Suvilahti's industrial area in Helsinki. The Flow Festival 2007 line-up included Nicole Willis & The Soul Investigators, Architecture in Helsinki, Op:l Bastards, Risto, Jori Hulkkonen, Pepe Deluxé, Terry Callier and The Valkyrians.

=== 2008 ===
The 2008 line-up included Cut Copy, Kings of Convenience, Crystal Castles, 22-Pistepirkko, The Roots, Sébastien Tellier, Múm and Huoratron.

=== 2009 ===
The musical line-up consisted (among others) of Lily Allen, Kraftwerk, Vampire Weekend, Grace Jones, White Lies, Yann Tiersen, Final Fantasy and Fever Ray.

During its four days, the evergrowing Flow Festival already gathered around 40,000 visitors. In 2009, Flow Festival won its first Music & Media Finland Festival of the Year award.

=== 2010 ===
The 2010 line-up consisted of artists such as The Chemical Brothers, LCD Soundsystem, Big Boi, Air, M.I.A., Robyn, The xx and Beach House.

=== 2011 ===
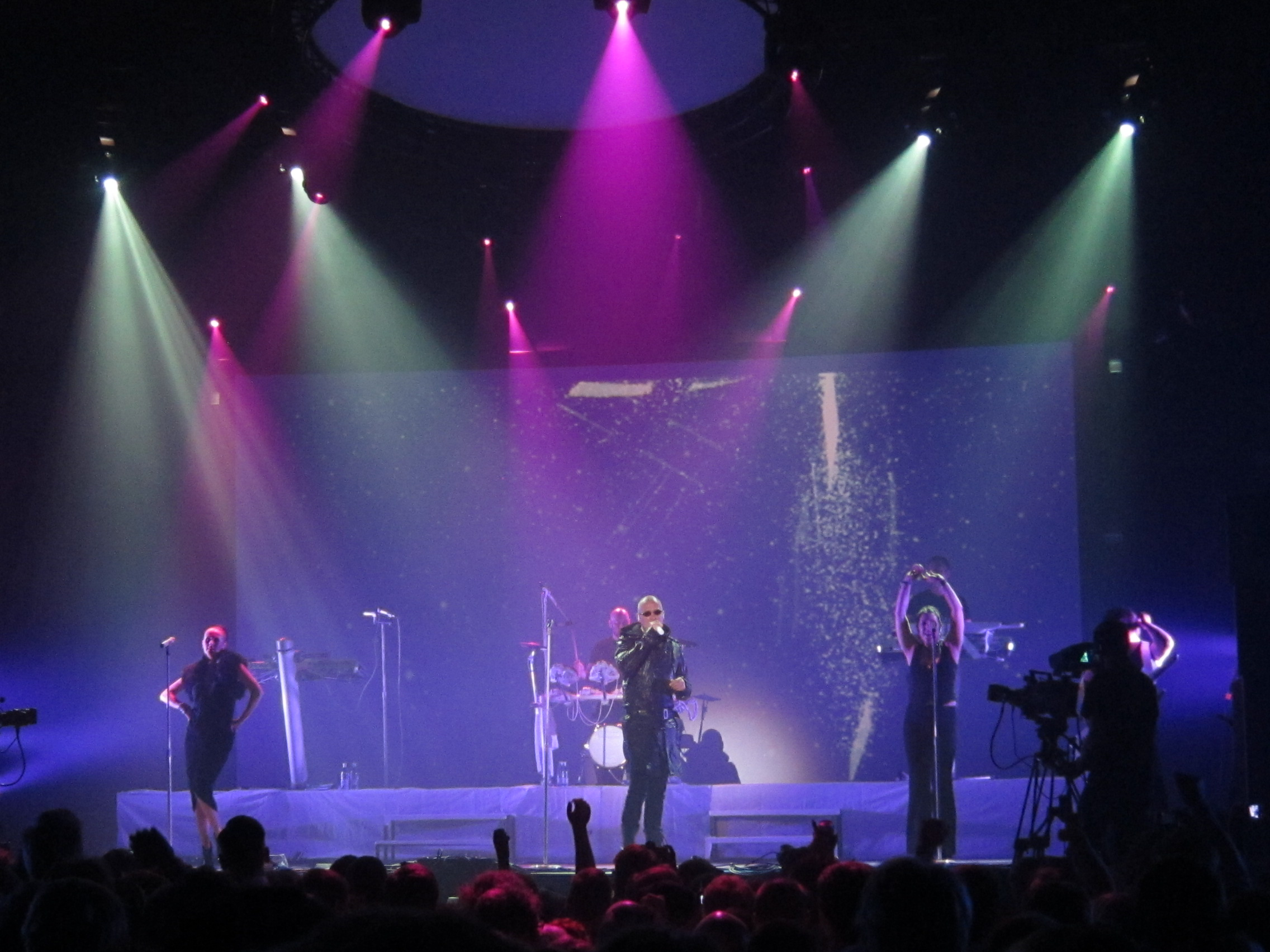
The Human League performing 2011.

Line-up included Kanye West, Röyksopp, MF Doom, Empire of the Sun, Lykke Li, Iron & Wine and The Human League.

Flow Festival was chosen as the Finnish Festival of the Year for the second time.

=== 2012 ===
Line-up in 2012 included Björk, Feist, Bon Iver, The Black Keys, Lykke Li and Yann Tiersen.

Flow Festival was once again chosen as the Music & Media Finland's Finnish Festival of the Year.

=== 2013 ===
The 10th anniversary year's festival line-up saw performances from artists such as Nick Cave & The Bad Seeds, Alicia Keys, Kendrick Lamar, Kraftwerk (the band's second Flow Festival appearance), Public Enemy, Cat Power, The Knife, My Bloody Valentine, Beach House (also the band's second Flow appearance) and Cody Chesnutt.

=== 2014 ===
This year's Flow Festival took place from 8 to 10 August 2014. OutKast, The National, Bonobo, Robyn with Röyksopp, Little Dragon, Janelle Monáe, Die Antwoord, Blood Orange and Slowdive.

=== 2015 ===
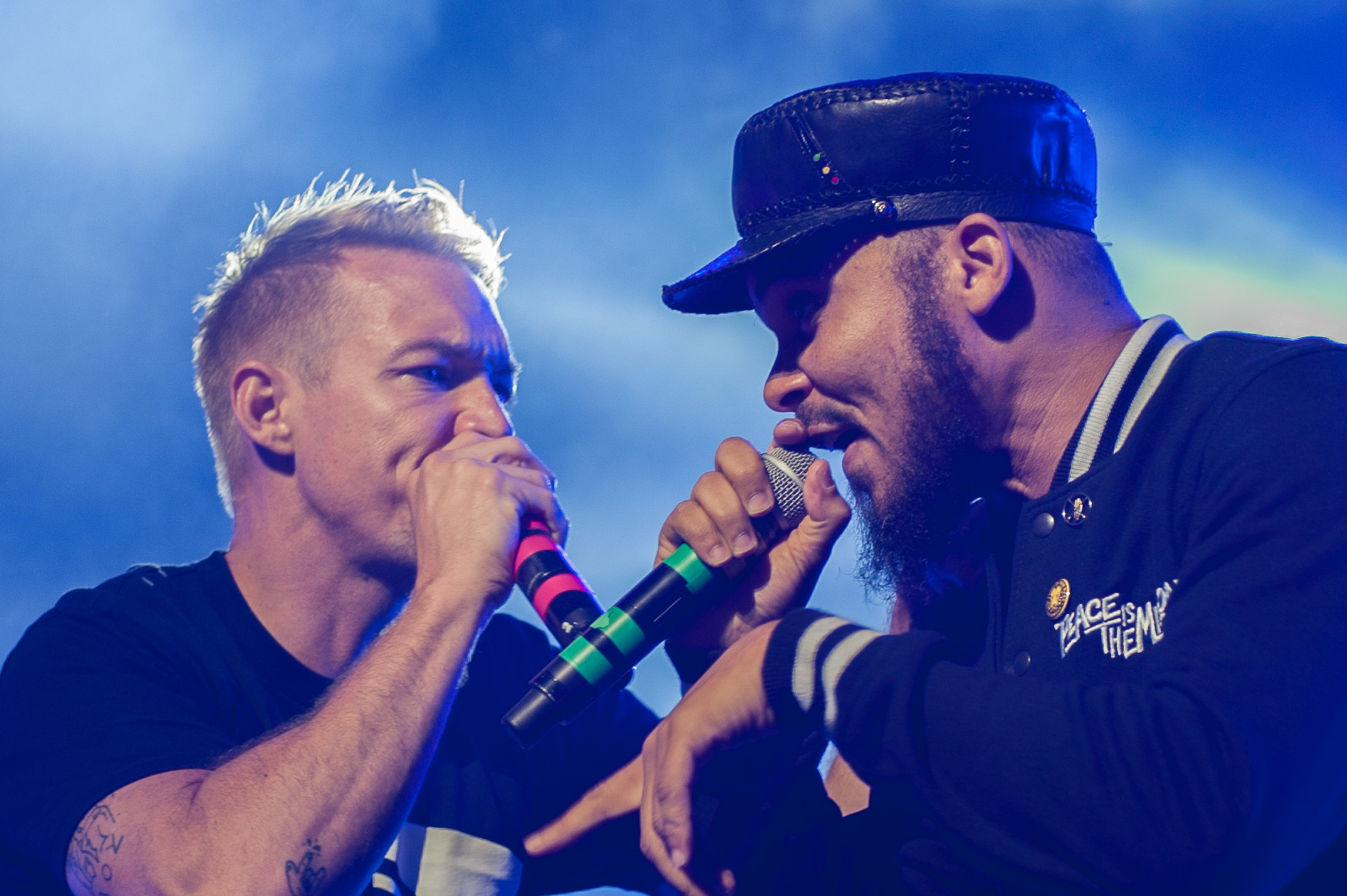
Major Lazer performing 2015.

Line-up included Pet Shop Boys, Florence and the Machine, Major Lazer, Belle and Sebastian, Seinabo Sey, Foxygen, Beck, Róisín Murphy and CHIC featuring Nile Rodgers among others. The festival took place from 14 to 16 August 2015.

=== 2016 ===
In 2016 the festival took place from 12 to 14 August and the line-up included artists such as Iggy Pop, Jamie xx, Chvrches, Sia, M83 and New Order.

=== 2017 ===
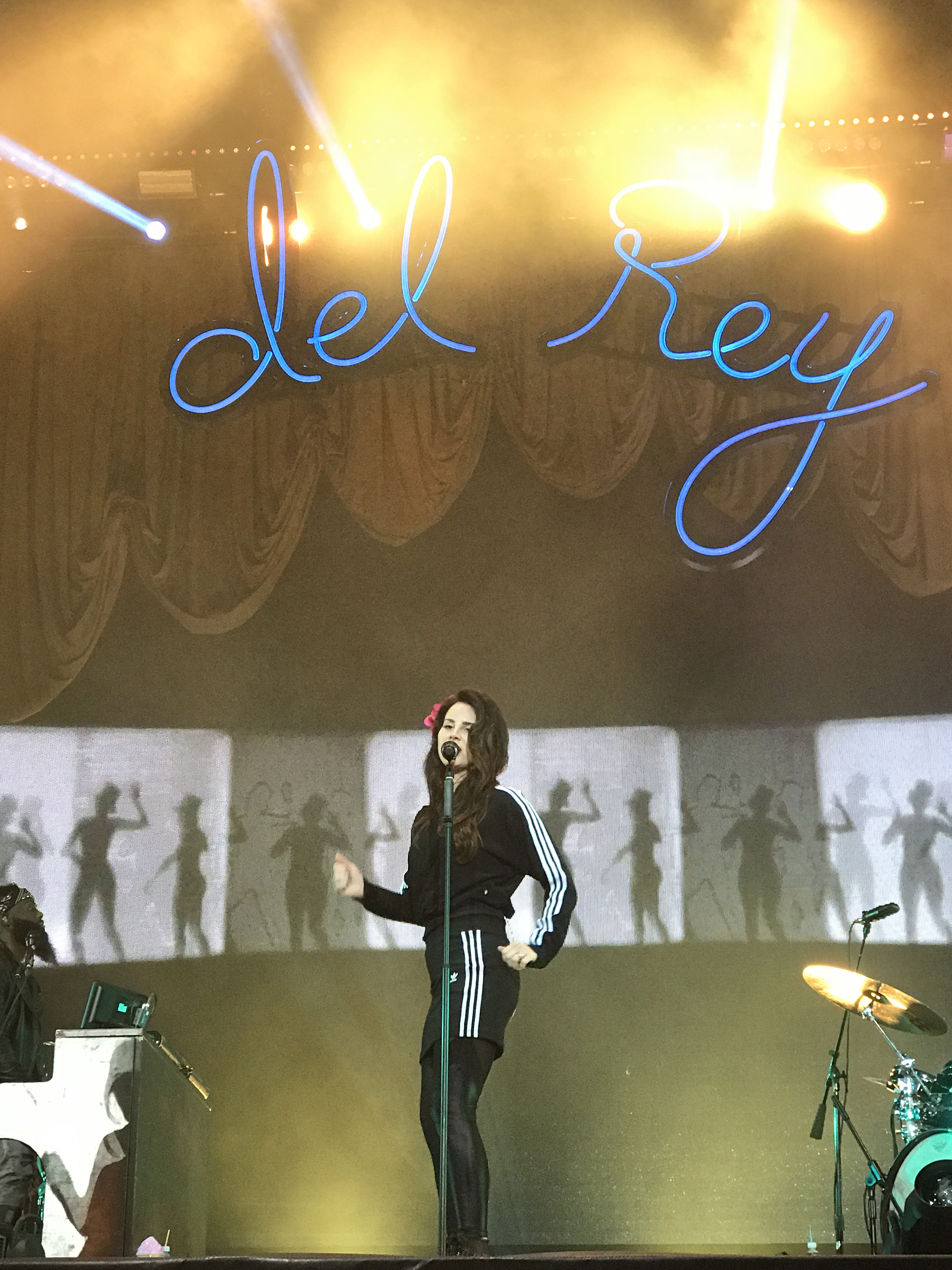
Lana Del Rey performs during the 2017 edition of the festival.

In 2017 the festival was held from 11 to 13 August and the line-up consisted of artists like Lana Del Rey, London Grammar, Roy Ayers, Skott, the XX, Alma, Frank Ocean, Aphex Twin.

=== 2018 ===
The 2018 edition of Flow was held from 10 to 12 August. The 2018 festival was headlined by Patti Smith, Arctic Monkeys and Kendrick Lamar.

=== 2019 ===
The 2019 Flow Festival took place on the 9 to 11 August 2019. The line-up included The Cure, Tame Impala, Robyn, Modeselektor and Mitski.

=== 2020 ===
Flow Festival 2020 was cancelled due to the COVID-19 pandemic.

=== 2021 ===
Flow Festival 2021 went online due to the COVID-19 pandemic.

=== 2022 ===
The 2022 Flow Festival took place 12 to 14 August 2022. The line-up included Gorillaz, Florence + The Machine, Burna Boy, Sigrid and Freddie Gibbs.

=== 2023 ===
The 2023 Flow Festival took place 11 to 13 August 2023. Lineup included Blur, Kaytranada, Lorde, Pusha T and Tove Lo.

=== 2024 ===
The 2024 Flow Festival took place from 9th to 11th of August 2024. The line-up consisted of Fred again.., Halsey, Pulp, Janelle Monáe, Raye and more.

=== 2025 ===
The 2025 edition of Flow Festival was held from 8th to 10th of August 2025. Headlining each of the three nights respectively were FKA Twigs, Burna Boy, and Charli XCX. Supporting international acts included Air, Little Simz, Lola Young, Kneecap, and Fontaines D.C. The festival drew praise from the American magazine Rolling Stone. In the review some of the local acts were also highlighted, those being rappers Turisti and Sexmane.

== Awards ==
Flow Festival has been awarded the Music & Media Finland Best Festival award four times in 2009, 2010, 2011 and 2013.

In 2013, Flow Festival was also nominated as "Best Medium-Sized Festival" at the European Festivals Awards.
