= Ana Carmona =

Ana Carmona may refer to:

- Anna Maria Mengs (1751–1792), or Ana Carmona, German artist
- Ana Carmona (footballer) (1908–1940), Spanish footballer
