= Islaja =

Musical artist (born 1979)

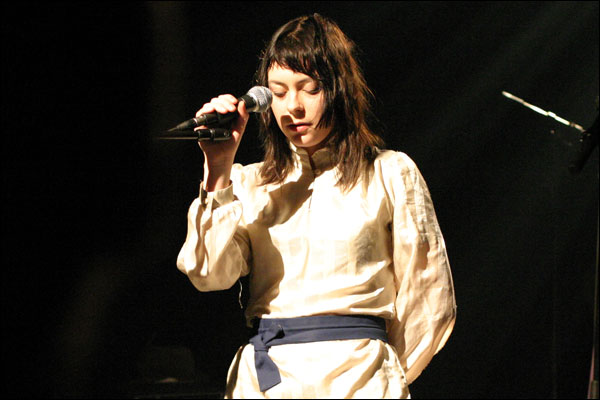

Background information
- Also known as: Islaja
- Born: Merja Kokkonen; 19 May 1979 (age 46); Helsinki, Finland
- Origin: Finland
- Genres: Folk, experimental, acid folk
- Occupation(s): Singer, songwriter, musician
- Years active: 2004–present
- Labels: Fonal
- Website: islaja.com

Merja Kokkonen (born 19 May 1979), better known by her stage name Islaja, is a singer-songwriter and musician from Helsinki, Finland. Besides her solo career, she is a member of free improv and psychedelic folk bands Avarus, Kemialliset Ystävät, and the trio Hertta Lussu Ässä.

She has been compared to Björk, Syd Barrett, and Nico.

Her music is psychedelic and intimate using a large variety of instruments. She is a multi-instrumentalist.

As of 2017, she is based in Berlin.

== Discography ==
- Meritie (Fonal, 2004)
- Palaa aurinkoon (Fonal, 2005)
- Ulual Yyy (Fonal, 2007)
- Blaze Mountain Recordings (Ecstatic Peace, 2008)
- Keraaminen Pää (Fonal, 2010)
- S U U (Monika Enterprise, 2014)
- Tarrantulla (Svart Records, 2017)
- Angel Tape (Other Power, 2023)

== Also appears on ==
- Beginner's Guide to Scandinavia (3CD, Nascente 2011)

== Images ==
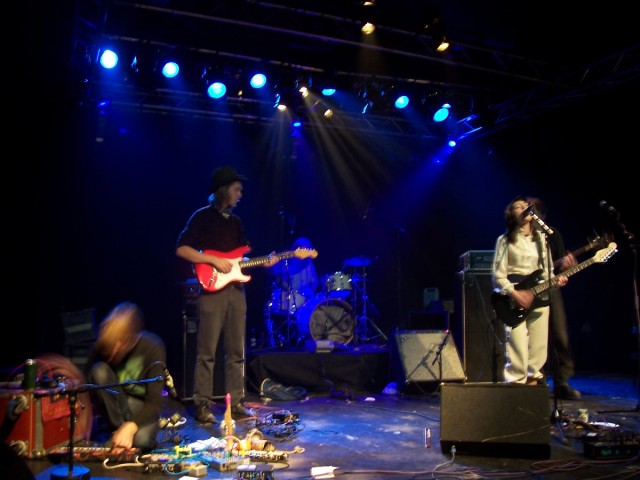
Islaja, 2006

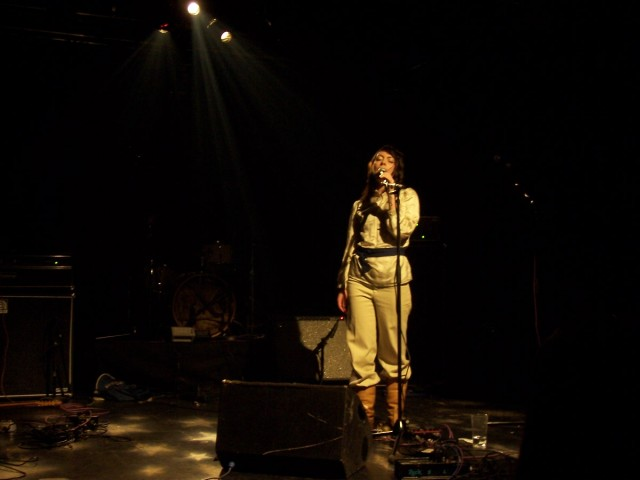
Islaja, 2006
