= Paavoharju =

Finnish musical collective

- Origin: Savonlinna, Finland
- Genres: Psychedelic folk, dream pop, ambient, lo-fi, experimental hip hop
- Years active: 2000–2013, 2023
- Labels: Fonal Records; Svart Records; Miasmah
- Past members: Lauri Ainala; Olli Ainala; Toni Kähkönen; Jenni Koivistoinen (singer); Joose Keskitalo; Johannes Pitkänen; Emmi Uimonen; Paperi T/Henri Pulkkinen (rapper)
- Website: www.paavoharju.com

Paavoharju was a Finnish musical collective formed originally around two brothers, Lauri and Olli Ainala. They came to attention in 2005 when their debut album was highlighted as "Album of the Week" by popular publication Stylus Magazine.

2008's Laulu laakson kukista, their second album, (translates to A Song about Flowers of the Valley) was selected by noted music website Pitchfork as a recommendation, and ranked 18th on Metacritic's list of the 30 best-reviewed albums of the year.

The band toured the United Kingdom in mid-2007, playing shows in London and Bristol.

Paavoharju announced their decision to disband on October 1, 2023.

== History ==
Lauri Ainala founded Paavoharju in Savonlinna in the year 2000. Initially, the music consisted of Lauri's experiments with different sounds (such as the buzzing of a wasp in a matchbox), combined with rhythms created using tracker programs from the 90s. Soon, Lauri's brother Olli Ainala and their friend Johannes Pitkänen joined the experiments, introducing "real" instruments like guitars and children's toy synthesizers into the music.

In the early 2000s Lauri Ainala lived in an abandoned dairy called Tuote in the center of Savonlinna and in several dilapidated deserted houses. He built several sauna huts from waste materials and mourned the countless demolished and destroyed buildings in Savonlinna. In addition to the deep impact of his hometown, more concrete cultural influences include Talvisalo cemetery in Savonlinna, A Love Cycle album by Sami Sänpäkkilä, 90s' lo-fi black metal, NES game soundtracks and old children's television shows. The decades of alcohol-soaked adventures with friends, memories, religion and irreligion, accidents and happiness, deaths, births, quitting substance abuse, and love – all of this has profoundly contributed to the birth of Paavoharju's aesthetics and sound.

In the spring of 2002, Lauri, Olli, and Johannes met Mimosa Virtanen and Jenni Koivistoinen (now known as Yaber), whose vocals were tried out on various musical backgrounds. The debut album Yhä hämärää was gradually created over the next three years. Also joining the group were Joose Keskitalo, known from the local church youth group, and Toni Kähkönen, a childhood friend of the Ainala brothers from Pöllänlahti, Savonlinna.

On their second album Laulu laakson kukista pianist and vocalist Emmi Uimonen also joined the ranks and there were also guest appearances by artists such as Leena Uotila, Ville Leinonen, Anna Karjalainen, Toivo Rolser, and Kristin Evensen Giæver.

The third album, Joko sinä tulet tänne alas tai minä nousen sinne, has a mood that is far removed from the worlds of the first two albums. It features the vocals of Paperi T, also known as Henri Pulkkinen, and introduces a new vocalist, Anniina Saksa and Sami Kukka who made a guest appearance. This album is the only one that was not produced in Savonlinna. The intention was for the album to seal Paavoharju's coffin shut, but things turned out differently.

When Lauri Ainala and his friends discovered a cemetery of glass negatives underneath an abandoned house in Savonlinna, Paavoharju had to return to the world of the living. Almost all the members from the previous albums are featured on their fourth record titled Yön mustia kukkia released in the fall of 2023. The album name was coined by Lauri's daughter Leppä Ainala. Anniina Saksa who used to sing in the live line-up now takes the main responsibility for the vocals and Teemu Eerola's violins tie the album's songs together, creating a recognizable Paavoharju sound with fresh nuances. The mysterious producer Rautavaara also brought entirely new sounds to the palette, and Olli Aarni delivered an unprecedented cascade of delightful sounds in two tracks.

The distinct sound of Paavoharju is constructed with microphones purchased from the flea market, old PC computers, and free software such as ModPlug Tracker and Cool Edit. In addition Ainala has used technology ranging from old cassettes to software that translates images to audio. This same modus operandi and programs are still used by Lauri Ainala to this day.

Paavoharju has manifested itself in various live incarnations over the years that has been a distinct entity, both in terms of the performers and the soundscapes. Live performances have taken place in Moscow, London, Roskilde Festival, Flow Festival, and smaller sold-out shows like the one at G-Livelab in Tampere which was released as a live album titled Kastoin sulkaa kuulla.

== Discography ==
=== Albums ===
- Yhä hämärää (Fonal Records, 2005)
- Laulu laakson kukista (Fonal Records, 2008)
- Joko sinä tulet tänne alas tai minä nousen sinne (Svart Records, 2013)
- Happiness – Joose Keskitalo & Paavoharju (Helmi Levyt, 2022)
- Yön mustia kukkia (Fonal Records, 2023)

=== Singles and EPs ===
- Maxi Ranskikset EP (self-released, 2002)
- Minä ja kapteeni/Onni – Joose Keskitalo & Paavoharju, 7" single (Helmi Levyt, 2005)
- Tuote-akatemia / Unien Savonlinna EP (Miasmah, 2006)
- Uskallan 7" single (Type Records, 2006)
- Laulu laakson kukasta, MP3 EP, (Fonal Records, 2008)

=== Compilations ===
- Ikkunat näkevät, MP3 EP, (Fonal Records, 2011)
- Unohdetaan jo se taivas, CD LP, (Svart Records, 2018)
- Syvyys – The Fonal Years. Vol 1, LP (Svart Records, 2019)
- Uskallan – The Fonal Years. Vol 2, LP (Svart Records, 2019)

=== Live albums ===
- Kastoin sulkaa kuulla, LP (Fonal Records, Helmi Levyt), 2021)

=== Video ===
- Unien Savonlinna, DVD release (Fonal Records, Helmi Levyt, 2010)

=== Book ===
- Tuote, (Svart Records, 2018)
