= Zoe Bonafonte =

Spanish actress

- Bonafonte in 2026
- Born: 10 March 2004 (age 22); Barcelona, Catalonia, Spain
- Occupation: Actress

Zoe Bonafonte (born 10 March 2004) is a Spanish actress. Her film debut in The 47 (2024) earned her an Actors and Actresses Union Award for Best New Actress and a nomination for the Goya Award for Best New Actress.

== Life and career ==
Bonafonte was born on 10 March 2004 in Barcelona. Her mother is Thai. After displaying an interest for acting at a young age, she moved to the United States at age 14 thanks to a scholarship. At age 15, she settled in Madrid to pursue her acting career. For her acting training, she studied at the Corazza school, the Juan Codina school, the company Dagoll Dagom, and the school operated by Clara Méndez-Leite and Alberto Ammann. Her career began with a role in over twenty episodes of the long-running soap opera Amar es para siempre (her screen debut) and a supporting role in the series Escándalo. Relato de una obsesión.

She made her feature film debut in the historical drama The 47 (2024) portraying the daughter of the characters played by Eduard Fernández and Clara Segura. Her performance in the former film as a Catalan girl not much appreciative of life deprivations earned her nominations for the Goya Award for Best New Actress and for the CEC Award for Best New Actress. She then starred in the fantasy romantic drama The Goldsmith's Secret (2025), portraying the young version of Celia (portrayed by Michelle Jenner as an adult), and featured in the period dramedy series The Lady's Companion as the middle sister of the Mencía family who wants to join university and study medicine.

In July 2025, she was reported to have joined the shooting of Pray for Us in a leading role. In October 2025, she was reported to toplist the cast of teen and dance film On Fire. In August 2026, she was reported to star as Ana "Nita" Carmona Ruiz in the soccer drama film Veleta.

== Filmography ==
Key
†	Denotes films that have not yet been released

=== Film ===
Year	Title	Role	Notes	Ref.
2024	El 47 (The 47)	Joana	Feature film debut	
2025	El secreto del orfebre (The Goldsmith's Secret)	Celia		
2026	A fuego (On Fire)	Lola		
2026	Enfrentados: Marfil (Drawn Together)	Gabriela		
2026	Ruega por nosotras (Pray for Us)	Ana		
2027	Veleta †	Ana "Nita" Carmona Ruiz	Filming	

=== Television ===
Year	Title	Role	Notes	Ref.
2022	Amar es para siempre	Susi	Television debut	
2023	Escándalo. Relato de una obsesión			
2025	Manual para señoritas (The Lady's Companion)	Sara Mencía		

== Accolades ==
Year	Award	Category	Work	Result	Ref.
2025	17th Gaudí Awards	Best New Performance	The 47	Nominated	
2025	80th CEC Medals	Best New Actress	The 47	Nominated	
2025	39th Goya Awards	Best New Actress	The 47	Nominated	
2025	33rd Actors and Actresses Union Awards	Best New Actress	The 47	Won	
