= Club Femení Barcelona =

Club Femení Barcelona may refer to:

- FC Barcelona Femení, which had this name between 1994 and 2002
- Club Femení i d'Esports de Barcelona, a defunct women's sport organisation
