= Laulu laakson kukista =

Laulu Laakson Kukista

Studio album by Paavoharju
- Released: 14 July 2008
- Genres: Psychedelic folk, ambient
- Length: 35:02
- Label: Fonal Records

Paavoharju chronology
Yhä hämärää (2005)	Laulu Laakson Kukista (2008)	Joko sinä tulet tänne alas tai minä nousen sinne (2013)

Professional ratings
Aggregate scores
Source	Rating
Metacritic	85/100
Review scores
Source	Rating
Allmusic	4/5 stars
Pitchfork	(8.3/10)
PopMatters	8/10

Laulu laakson kukista (Song of the Flowers of the Valley) is the second studio album by the Finnish psychedelic folk band Paavoharju.

== Track listing ==
No.	Title	Length
1.	"Pimeänkarkelo"	3:56
2.	"Kevätrumpu"	3:56
3.	"Tuoksu tarttuu meihin"	3:43
4.	"Italialaisella laivalla"	3:49
5.	"Alania"	0:49
6.	"Uskallan"	3:20
7.	"Ursulan uni"	2:36
8.	"Kirkonväki"	3:46
9.	"Salainen huone"	1:07
10.	"Tyttö tanssii"	3:51
11.	"Sumuvirsi"	3:05
12.	"11"	1:04
