= Past Lies =

Spanish television series

- Spanish: Las largas sombras
- Based on: Las largas sombras by Elia Barceló
- Written by: Clara Roquet; Miguel Sáez Carral; Adrià P. Xancó; Lucía Carballal; Estíbaliz Burgaleta
- Directed by: Clara Roquet; Júlia de Paz
- Starring: Elena Anaya; Belén Cuesta; Irene Escolar; Marta Etura; Ana Rayo; Itziar Atienza; Lorena López
- Country of origin: Spain
- Original language: Spanish
- No. of seasons: 1
- No. of episodes: 6

Production
- Executive producers: José Manuel Lorenzo; Adrià P. Xancó; Clara Nieto
- Cinematography: Neus Ollé
- Production company: DLO Producciones

Original release
- Network: Disney+
- Release: 10 May 2024

Past Lies (Spanish: Las largas sombras, lit. 'The long shadows') is a Spanish limited thriller television series directed by Clara Roquet and Júlia de Paz Solvas based on the novel by Elia Barceló. It was made available on Disney+ on 10 May 2024. It stars Elena Anaya, Belén Cuesta, Irene Escolar, Marta Etura, Ana Rayo, Itziar Atienza, and Lorena López.

== Plot ==
The plot tracks a group of fortysomething friends from Elda, to whom the disappearance of their friend Mati 25 years ago comes back to haunt them.

== Cast ==
- Elena Anaya as Rita
- Belén Cuesta as Teresa
- Marta Etura as Sole
- Itziar Atienza as Candela
- Lorena López as Lena
- Ana Rayo as Carmen
- Laura Wedel as Mati
- Irene Escolar as Paula
- Jorge Usón as Manolo
- Roger Casamajor
- Juan Blanco
- Nansi Nsue as Ángela
- Fran Nortes as Adrián
- Isa Montalbán as Rita
- Andrea López as Sole
- Marina Orta
- Miriam Rubio as Lena
- Ana de Alva as Carmen
- Lucía Caraballo as Teresa

== Production ==
Clara Roquet directed alongside Júlia de Paz and wrote the series alongside Miguel Sáez Carral, Adrià P. Xancó, Lucía Carballal, and Estíbaliz Burgaleta. Filming took place in the Valencia region (Elda, Benidorm, La Falla de Moraig, Denia, Altea) and Madrid.

== Release ==
The series had a premiere at the D'A Film Festival. It was released on Disney+ on 10 May 2024.

== Accolades ==
Year	Award	Category	Nominee(s)	Result	Ref.
2025	26th Iris Awards	Best Actress	Elena Anaya	Nominated	

== See also ==
- 2024 in Spanish television
