= César del Villar =

Spanish military and politician

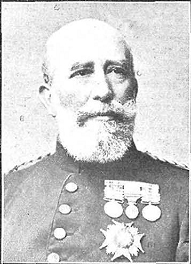
- Portrait of General Villar, in Nuevo Mundo, photographed by Christian Franzen.
- Born: Victor Augusto César del Villar y Villate; 23 December 1843; Sestao, Spain
- Died: 2 September 1917 (aged 73); Getxo, Biscay, Spain
- Resting place: Sestao Cemetery
- Occupations: Military; Politician
- Known for: Captain General of Catalonia

Captain General of Catalonia
- In office 16 December 1914 – 25 December 1915
- Monarch: Alfonso XIII
- Prime Minister: Eduardo Dato; Count of Romanones
- Minister of War: Ramón Echegüe y Méndez Vigo; Agustín de Luque y Coca
- Preceded by: Valeriano Weyler
- Succeeded by: Felipe Alfau y Mendoza

Minister of War of Spain
- In office 16 December 1904 – 27 January 1905
- Monarch: Alfonso XIII
- Prime Minister: Marcelo Azcárraga Palmero
- Preceded by: Arsenio Linares y Pombo
- Succeeded by: Vicente Pérez de Santamaría

Victor Augusto César del Villar y Villate (23 December 1843 – 2 September 1917) was a Spanish military officer and politician, who became Minister of War.

== Early life and education ==
Villar was born on 23 December 1843 in Sestao into an urban middle-class family with clear liberal connotations. He was the son of José Manuel Villar y Salcedo and Antonia Villate de la Hera, sister of General Blas Villate and, therefore, with a military background in his family.

After completing primary education in his hometown, Villar entered the Infantry Academy in 1858, graduating as a second lieutenant four years later.

== Military career ==
In 1864, Villar was appointed lieutenant of the General Staff, commander in 1872, colonel in 1874, commander of the General Staff in 1875, and lieutenant colonel five years later, brigadier in 1883, and brigadier general in 1889; division general in 1893 and lieutenant general in 1903.

In 1875, Villar participated in the "taking of Olot" and the surrender of the La Seu d'Urgell during the Third Carlist War (1872–76) in Catalonia. In 1886 he helped quell republican insurrections at court, with Queen Maria Christina of Austria showing her Royal Appreciation. He was present in the peninsular campaigns against Carlism and acracy and also in overseas campaigns, he enjoyed solid prestige among his comrades in arms for his professionalism and distance from political struggles. It was only at the express wish of his comrade and close friend Marcelo Azcárraga that he decided to accept the appointment of Minister of War in December 1904 (it was not for a gesture of solidarity military and respect for the Crown), a position that he held until January of the following year, when he resigned because he was not satisfied that the sessions of the Courts resumed on the day of the king's name day, dragging in his resignation the entire Cabinet.

Villar was Captain General of Catalonia between 1914 and 1915.

== Later life and death ==
In June 1914, Villar, then president of the Federación Femenina contra la Tuberculosis (Women's Federation Against Tuberculosis), together with his daughter Carmen, attended a women's football match between the members of Spanish Girl's Club held for the benefit of his organization.

Villar died on 2 September 1917, at the age of 73, during his vacation in the Biscayan town of Getxo, and his remains were transferred to the Sestao Cemetery. He has a street in this locality, in addition to having the title of Favorite Son.

== Decorations and tributes ==
- White Cross of the Order of Military Merit
- Red Cross of the Order of Military Merit
- Grand Cross of the Order of Military Merit
- Encomienda of Our Lady of the Conception of Portugal
- Bavarian Military Merit Commandery
- Grand Cross of the Order of Saint Hermenegild
- 1907: Knight 1st class of the Imperial Order of the Iron Crown (Austro-Hungarian Empire)
- Alfonso XII Medal
- Cross of the Order of Charles III
- Sestao's Favorite Son
- Street in Sestao
