= Pray for Us =

- Theatrical release poster
- Spanish: Ruega por nosotras
- Directed by: Daniel Monzón
- Screenplay by: Daniel Monzón; Jorge Guerricaechevarría
- Produced by: Ibon Cormenzana; Sandra Tapia Díaz; Ángel Durández
- Starring: Zoe Bonafonte; Manuela Calle; Adelfa Calvo; María Cerezuela; Carla Domínguez; María Gandiaga; Malena Gutiérrez; Belén Cruz; Bea Segura; Xavi Sáez
- Cinematography: Carles Gusi
- Edited by: Mapa Pastor
- Music by: Roque Baños
- Production companies: Arcadia Motion Pictures; Amalur Pictures AIE; Noodles Production
- Distributed by: Elastica
- Release dates: 21 September 2026 (Zinemaldia); 6 November 2026 (Spain)
- Running time: 136 minutes
- Countries: Spain; France
- Language: Spanish

Pray for Us (Spanish: Ruega por nosotras) is a 2026 drama film directed by Daniel Monzón and co-written by Jorge Guerricaechevarría starring Zoe Bonafonte and Manuela Calle. It is a Spanish-French co-production. Set in the 1970s, it explores female friendship against the backdrop of the terrible conditions experienced by young women held under the Women's Protection Board.

It premiered at the 74th San Sebastián International Film Festival on 21 September 2026 ahead of its 6 November 2026 theatrical release in Spain by Elastica.

== Plot ==
In 1974 Barcelona, 19-year-old Ana is put by her well-off family into the grip of the Francoist Women's Protection Board. She is taken to a nun-run reformatory institution in Madrid, where she faces an oppressive disciplinary system. She bonds with lively Sole, a small town girl in a similar plight.

== Cast ==
- Zoe Bonafonte as Ana
- Manuela Calle as Sole
- Carla Domínguez as Pilar
- María Gandiaga as Marifé
- Shiara Fernández
- Adelfa Calvo as hermana Socorro
- Malena Gutiérrez
- María Cerezuela
- Belén Cruz
- Xavi Sáez as Rodrigo
- Bea Segura

== Production ==
The screenplay was written by Daniel Monzón along with recurring collaborator Jorge Guerricaechevarría. Ruega por nosotras is a Spanish-French co-production by Arcadia Motion Pictures alongside Noodles Production, with the participation of RTVE, Netflix, and 3Cat and funding from ICAA, boasting a €5.1 million budget. Shooting locations in Bizkaia (Orduña, Jardines de Albia) stood in for 1970s Madrid. Shooting locations also included Barcelona. On 29 July 2025, the main cast was disclosed, including leading actresses Zoe Bonafonte and newcomer Manuela Calle together with Carla Domínguez, María Gandiaga, Shiara Fernández, Adelfa Calvo, Malena Gutiérrez, María Cerezuela, Belén Cruz, Xavi Saez, and Bea Segura. Shooting wrapped on 27 August 2025.

== Release ==
The film was presented at the 74th San Sebastián International Film Festival on 21 September 2026. Distributed by Elastica, the film was released theatrically in Spain on 6 November 2026.

Film Factory Entertainment acquired international sales on the film. The film was programmed at the 57th International Film Festival of India (IFFI) held in Goa.

== Reception ==
Alfonso Rivera of Cineuropa wrote that the film "slots nicely into a subgenre that fuses the prison film" "with tales of attempts to break out of those cages".

Laura Pérez of Fotogramas rated the film 4 out of 5 stars, citing "its seamless screenplay and the performances of its two leads" as the best things about the film.

Javier Ocaña of El País lamented that the film whitewashes the context with a portrayal depicting exclusively girls from 'good families', otherwise finding the film to be closer to an excursive episode of Cuéntame than to The Magdalene Sisters.

Nuria Vidal of Cinemanía rated the film 4 out of 5 stars, pointing out that Monzón revisits and updates a particular style of 1970s genre cinema just as he did with the quinqui genre in Outlaws.

Marta Medina del Valle of El Confidencial rated the film 3 out of 5 stars, considering that it really comes into its own when the camera focuses on the energy of its two leads bringing truth and magnetism to a somewhat stiffened mise-en-scène.

In a 2-star rating, Oti Rodríguez Marchante of ABC assessed that Monzón does not manage to brush off the sense of implausibility, "with characters and behaviours that are hard not to see as stereotypes or clichés".

In a 4-star rating, Sergi Sánchez of La Razón pointed out that the film explores female solidarity, "so well represented here by the chaste and pure love between the two leading ladies", celebrating how it "sheds light on a sinister chapter in the history of Spain that resonates powerfully with the current political climate".

Raquel Hernández Luján of HobbyConsolas gave the film a 78-point score, considering that it displays "high production values and excellent casting choices", otherwise judging how it makes a strong impression, moves the viewer and is astonishing in just how recent the events depicted are.

== See also ==
- List of Spanish films of 2026
