= On Fire (2026 film) =

- Theatrical release poster
- Spanish: A fuego
- Directed by: Estel Díaz
- Written by: Estel Díaz; Núria Dunjó
- Produced by: Jaime Ortiz de Artiñano; Ana Eiras; Alberto Aranda; Toni Carrizosa; Dani de la Orden; Adolfo Blanco
- Starring: Zoe Bonafonte; Marc Soler; Ruslana; Miquel Melero; Omar Banana
- Cinematography: Beatriz Sastre
- Edited by: Alba Cid
- Music by: Awwz
- Production companies: Ha Vuelto La Película AIE; Atresmedia Cine; Sábado Películas; Playtime Movies; A Contracorriente Films
- Distributed by: A Contracorriente Films
- Release date: 21 August 2026
- Running time: 97 minutes
- Country: Spain
- Language: Spanish

On Fire (Spanish: A fuego) is a 2026 Spanish teen dance drama film directed by Estel Díaz (in her debut feature) from a screenplay co-written by Núria Dunjó. It stars Zoe Bonafonte alongside Omar Banana, Marc Soler, Miquel Melero, and Ruslana.

== Premise ==
Upon her brother's death, 17-year-old Lola acquaints with a group of friends in 'the Bunker', a space priorly frequented by her brother in which clandestine parties and dance battles take place.

== Cast ==
- Zoe Bonafonte as Lola
- Omar Banana as Andy
- Marc Soler
- Miquel Melero as Nico
- Ruslana as Bego

== Production ==
Díaz described the story as being "set in adolescence, in the explosive mixture of positive and negative emotions in equal measure", choosing dance as "the language through which we express all the emotional elements that fuel the story". The film is an Ha Vuelto La Película AIE, Atresmedia Cine, Sábado Películas, Playtime Movies, and A Contracorriente Films production, and it had the participation of Atresmedia and Netflix. Beatriz Sastre worked as director of photography, using an Alexa 35, Arri Signature Primes, and Leica R Cinescope. The dance sequences were coreographed by Anna Macau. Shooting locations included Barcelona and the 'Three Chimneys' complex in Sant Adrià de Besòs. After six weeks of shooting, filming was reported to have wrapped in December 2025.

== Release ==
Distributed by A Contracorriente Films, it was released theatrically in Spain on 21 August 2026.

== Reception ==
Pere Vall of Fotogramas rated the film 3 out of 5 stars, highlighting the "jouncy mix of spectacle and anti-capitalist barbs" as the best thing about the film.

In a 2-star rating, Manuel J. Lombardo of Diario de Sevilla determined the film's dramatic framework to be its weakest link.

== See also ==
- List of Spanish films of 2026
