= Avarus (band) =

Finnish band

- Origin: Tampere, Finland
- Genres: Free folk; drone; free improvisation; psychedelic folk; psychedelic rock
- Years active: 2001–present
- Labels: Tumult, Lal Lal Lal, HP Cycle, Secret Eye, Arbor Infinity
- Members: Jan Anderzén; Roope Eronen; Tero Niskanen; Arttu Partinen; Lars Mattila; Markus Mäki; Kevin Regan; Jukka Räisänen; Merja Kokkonen "Islaja"; Lau Nau "Laura Naukkarinen"; Jonna Karanka "Kuupuu"

Avarus are a band from Tampere, Finland. They were formed in 2001 by members of The Anaksimandros and Pylon and soon absorbed members of other Finnish bands such as Killa, Munuaissymposium 1960, Kemialliset Ystävät and solo performer Lau Nau. Avarus' floating line-up varies between 10 and 20 members.

Avarus are considered a key element in the Finnish psychedelic folk scene which emerged in the early 2000s.

== Discography ==
- Horuksen Keskimmäisen Silmän Mysteerikoulu CD-R (Lal Lal Lal, 2001)
- Posum Ekor Kait Dataran 3" CD-R (Lal Lal Lal, 2001)
- Luonnon ilmiöitä 7" (Boing Being, 2002)
- III LP (HP Cycle Records, 2002)
- A-V-P CD-R (267 Lattajjaa, 2003)
- Kimi on tintti CS (Lal Lal Lal, 2004)
- Vaahtera Jäniksen Hännänkieliset Seikkailut 7" (Gold Soundz, 2004)
- Jättiläisrotta CD (Secret Eye, 2005)
- Ruskeatimantti dbl-CD (tUMULt, 2005)
- II LP (HP Cycle Records, 2006)
- Vesikansi CD (Secret Eye, 2006)
- Rasvaaja LP (Secret Eye, 2007)
- Kirppujen saari LP (Arbor, 2008)
- IV LP (Secret Eye / Ikuisuus, 2009)
- Toosassa LP (Ultra Eczema, 2009)
