= Alpinestars (band) =

Electronic rock duo

- Origin: Manchester, United Kingdom
- Genres: Electronic rock
- Years active: 1999–2003
- Labels: Faith and Hope; Guidance Recordings; Riverman Records; Astralwerks
- Members: Richard Woolgar; Glyn Thomas

Alpinestars was an electronic rock duo formed in 1999 in Manchester by Richard Woolgar and Glyn Thomas.

== History ==
=== The Beginnings (1995–1999) ===
Richard Woolgar and Glyn Thomas met each other in 1995, as a result of being in separate bands that shared the same rehearsal space. They found they had more in common with each other than with their respective bands, so they broke away to form their own ephemeral electro group, which they named "Maxim".

Although Maxim never produced anything, it brought Woolgar and Thomas to the attention of the promoter of a local Manchester club. They were invited to create an hour-long set to perform live within a week. They took the name "Alpinestars" after a mountain bike Thomas owned and proceeded to meet the challenge. The performance was a success and Alpinestars signed with Faith and Hope Records.

=== The EPs (1999–2000) ===
The band debuted in August 1999 with a limited edition EP titled "Las Vegas." Its third track, "Interlaken," became the most requested track on Steve Lamacq's Radio 1 evening show. The band followed up with two more EPs, "Silicon Chick" in November 1999, and "Kitzbuhel Weekend" in March 2000. A single taken from this latter EP became a "Single of the Week" in NME magazine.

=== B.A.S.I.C. and White Noise (2000–2003) ===
In July 2000, Alpinestars released their first commercial single "77 Sunset Strip," which they followed up with their first full-length album B.A.S.I.C. (standing for "Beginner's All-Purpose Symbolic Instruction Code"). B.A.S.I.C. was released in September 2000 by Faith and Hope, and rereleased in 2003 by Guidance Recordings. It was praised by numerous magazines, despite being hard to find.

Alpinestars left Faith and Hope in 2001 and released their second major album, White Noise, a year later, with Riverman Records and Astralwerks (for the US release). Both Woolgar and Thomas contributed vocals for songs on White Noise, and Brian Molko, lead singer of Placebo, lent Alpinestars his voice for "Carbon Kid". According to Woolgar, "We wanted to get away from the sampler duo mentality."

In a 2002 interview with PlayLouder, the pair was asked to talk about the direction they wanted to go with White Noise. On being unsigned, Thomas explained,

Being in an unsigned band is just as much fun as being in a signed band...It's almost as though that's the only time you're in total control of what you do - when you're unsigned...I'd be scared shitless being twenty one years old and signing a major record deal now because you know that you've only got a year to prove yourself. If you don't sell a lot of records in that year you're probably going to be yesterday's news very quickly and find it very difficult to move on and do something else.

== Discography ==
=== Albums ===
- B.A.S.I.C. (Guidance Recordings, 2000)
- White Noise (2002)
- Time Spent with Machines (2005) (unreleased)

=== Singles and EPs ===
Year	Title	UK Chart
1999	"Silicon Chick" (EP)	—
1999	"Less Vegas" (EP)	—
2000	"Kitzbühel Weekend" (EP)	—
2000	"77 Sunset Strip"	—
2001	"Interlaken"	94
2002	"Snow Patrol"	99
2002	"Carbon Kid" (featuring Brian Molko)	63
2003	"Burning Up"	84
"—" denotes releases that did not chart.

=== Game appearances ===
- "Jump Jet" featured in Midnight Club II.
- "Snow Patrol" featured in SSX 3.
- "Carbon Kid" featured in Project Gotham Racing 3, APB Reloaded and in Test Drive Unlimited.
