= Irene González (footballer) =

Spanish footballer (1909–1928)

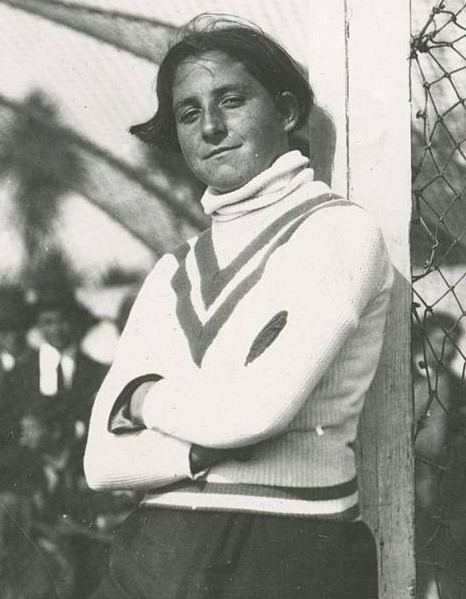
- González poses in net at a match in the Parque de Riazor in 1925

Personal information
- Full name: Irene González Basanta
- Date of birth: 26 March 1909
- Place of birth: A Coruña, Spain
- Date of death: 9 April 1928 (aged 19)
- Place of death: A Coruña, Spain
- Position: Goalkeeper

Youth career
- Barcelona FC
- Racing Coruñés

Senior career*
Years	Team	Apps	(Gls)
1925–1927	Irene Fútbol Club		
- * Club domestic league appearances and goals as of 20 April 2023

Irene González Basanta (26 March 1909 – 8 April 1928) was a Spanish professional footballer who played as a goalkeeper for Irene Fútbol Club, which she founded. She is credited as the first woman in Spain to play football professionally, and among the first anywhere.

== Early life ==
González was born near Campo de la Leña near the Monte Alto neighborhood of A Coruña, Galicia, Spain, and raised in the Orillamar neighborhood. As a child, she would join football matches played by boys in the streets or the fields of A Estrada. Her father was a police officer who did not approve of her youthful inclination toward football, and by some accounts would drag her screaming away from a match. By 1924, her parents, brother, and nephew had died, orphaning her to the care of her older sister, Delfina, and her brother-in-law, Delfina's husband.

== Club career ==
=== Local men's clubs ===
At the age of 15, González played as a centre-forward for local men's club Barcelona FC, unaffiliated with the Catalan club, and with local club Racing Coruñés. She later switched to goalkeeper and competed for minutes with Rodrigo García Vizoso, who would later join professional clubs Deportivo de La Coruña and Real Madrid. Vizoso recalled in 2008 that González would also attend his matches and cheer for him from behind his goal.

González faced regular misogynistic criticism, including slurs.

=== Irene Fútbol Club, 1925–1927 ===
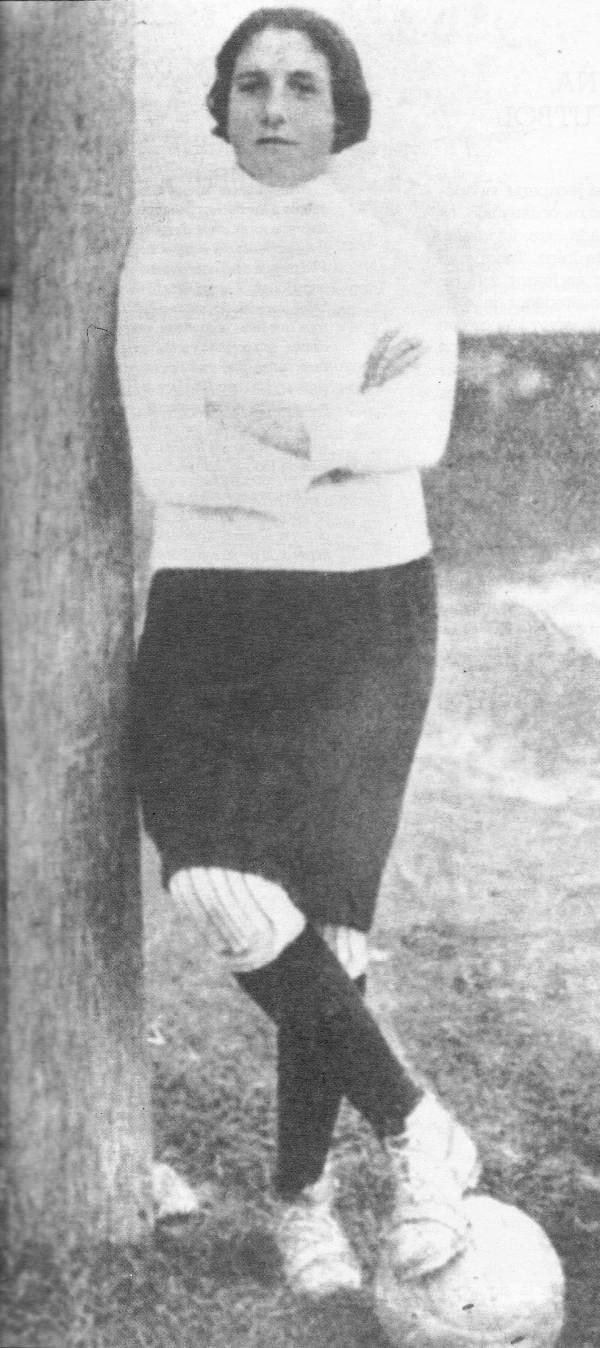
González dressed like Ricardo Zamora in 1925. A print of this photograph was posted in a shop window on A Coruña's Calle Real.

González launched Irene Fútbol Club in January 1925, at the age of 16, and served as the team's captain and promoter. The club's players were all male except for herself. The club toured Galicia and charged money to play matches, including friendly matches against third-division teams from Vilaboa, A Laracha, Carballo, and Betanzos, and exhibitions played before Deportivo de La Coruña matches in the Parque de Riazor.

The magazine Galicia covered the club in February 1925 with an anonymous commentary endorsing exercise among women, which was the subject of criticism and fears of the masculinization of women. González was photographed in 1925 leaning against a goalpost dressed similarly to her goalkeeping inspiration, Ricardo Zamora, in a white turtleneck sweater and black knee-length shorts, a football under her foot. The photograph was posted in a shop on Calle Real in A Coruña, a report of which published in the newspaper El Orzán drew notoriety to González and her club.

González organized an 18-team tournament from June to September 1925.

By 1926, Irene FC matches — marketed as children's events — drew enough attention that Racing de Ferrol charged for tickets for a match on 24 May 1926 between Irene FC and the club's reserves at Campo de Futbol O Inferniño. Irene FC lost 7–1 but were celebrated by the crowd and Racing's board, and the match was covered by the periodical El Pueblo Gallego.

González's last played match on record was on 1 May 1927.

== Playing style ==
Accounts of González's goalkeeping complimented her height, agility, and positioning, and noted her fearlessness in making diving saves and departures from the goal. She was reportedly vocal, even vulgar, in commanding her defensive line, and kept a doll of a footballer in her net as a ward against goals as her idol Zamora had also done.

== Illness and death ==
By the middle of 1927 González had fallen ill with tuberculosis, which had killed thousands in Galicia during an epidemic between 1924 and 1927. Locals and Galician newspapers staged fundraisers and a charity friendly match to support her family. She sold clothes and belongings to pay for treatment, though some of the charity helped her recover them and improve her living conditions. Clubs in Racing, Ferrol, and Betanzos also held collections to assist her. She was first reported dead on 9 April 1928, and confirmed by the newspaper El Eco de Santiago on 11 April 1928.

== Legacy ==
Irene era la capitana en un mundo de hombres, y en una época en la que el fútbol no era profesional y apenas había desarrollo técnico y táctico, demostró que, en igualdad de condiciones, había fútbol mixto.

Irene was the captain in a world of men, and at a time when football was not professional and there was hardly any technical and tactical development, she showed that, under equal conditions, there could be mixed (gender) football. — Esther Sullastres, goalkeeper for Sevilla FC and Spain

González inspired a chant among girls in A Coruña that survived several years after her death, in which the singer tells her mother that she wants to become wealthy playing fútbol like González:

Mamá, futbolista quiero ser

para jugar como Irene que juega muy bien

Mamá, cuando sea mayor

ganaré mucho dinero jugando al fútbol

Mamá, a footballer is what I want to be,

to play like Irene, who plays so well.

Mamá, when I am older,

I will make lots of money playing football.

— Galician children's chant

In 2022, the A Coruña city council approved a motion to rename a street in González's honor.

In 2023, La Coruña hosted the inaugural Copa Internacional Irene González Basanta, an international girls' club football tournament named in her honor. On 10 April 2023, the girls' academy of Real Madrid defeated their Sporting Braga counterparts 2–0 to win the first cup.

== See also ==
- Women's football in Spain
- Bans of women's association football in Spain
- Dick, Kerr Ladies F.C., a contemporary women's football club in England, and Lily Parr, its star striker
- Karbo Deportivo, based in La Coruña and now Deportivo de La Coruña's women's section, which won the first three editions of the Campeonato de España in 1983 to 1985
- Ana Carmona Ruiz

== Biographies and related works ==
- Irene y las puertas del fútbol: Historia de una pionera, a 2020 biography by Rubén Ventureira and Juan Luis Rodríguez Cudeiro
- Todo sobre o fútbol galego, a 2012 history of football in Galicia by Carlos Freire Cordeiro
- Irene, a porteira, a 2008 documentary short film by Óscar Losada
