= Fonal Records =

Finnish independent record label

Fonal Records is an independent record label from Finland. It was initially founded in the mid-1990s by Sami Sänpäkkilä to release his recordings under his recording name Es.

Sänpäkkilä initially ran the label from his childhood home in Ulvila and had his parents help package records.

Fonal is well known worldwide for championing the Finnish music scene. It is one of the labels associated with the Finnish psych-folk scene.

A large number of Fonal releases were recorded, mixed and mastered at their own SS-Palace Studio. The studio reflects the same principles as the record label, with a creative atmosphere, allowing anything from demos to full-length albums to be recorded. The studio boasts Digital 16-track simultaneous recording, or 8-track 1/4 inch reel-to-reel tape recording; also, importantly, lo-fi engineering, if required.

== Artists ==
- TV-resistori
- Paavoharju
- Goodiepal
- Islaja
- Kemialliset Ystävät
- Ignatz
- Lau Nau

== See also ==
- List of record labels
