= Ruslana Panchyshyna =

Spanish-Ukranian singer (born 2005)

Ruslana Руслана
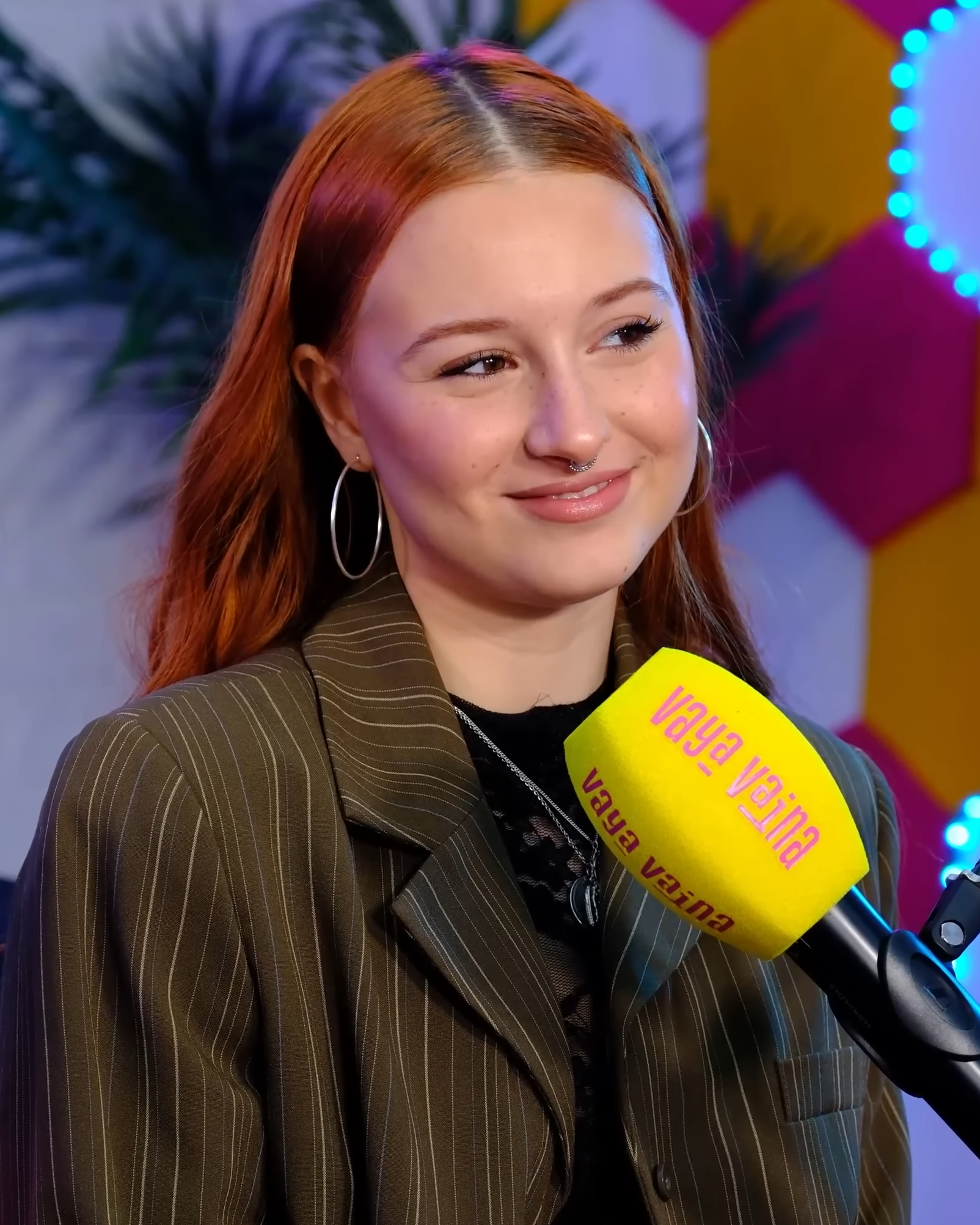
- Panchyshyna in 2024

Background information
- Born: Ruslana Panchyshyna; 10 September 2005 (age 21); Belarus
- Origin: Ukraine, Belarus, Canarias, Madrid
- Genres: Pop rock; rock; R&B; soul
- Occupations: Singer; songwriter
- Instruments: Vocals; guitar; bass guitar
- Years active: 2016–present
- Label: Universal Music Spain
- Website: ruslanaoficial.com

Ruslana Panchyshyna (Ukrainian: Руслана Панчишина; born 10 September, 2005), known mononymously as Ruslana (stylized in all caps), is a Spanish-Ukrainian singer and songwriter who rose to prominence after placing third in the twelfth edition of the Operación Triunfo contest.

From an early age, she participated in various musical competitions, including several preselections for the Junior Eurovision Song Contest in Belarus and La Voz Kids in 2019.

== Early life ==
Ruslana Panchyshyna was born on September 10, 2005 in Belarus to a Ukrainian family. She moved to Adeje, Canary Islands when she was around 7.

She later relocated to Madrid where she studied Performing Arts in high school, before putting her studies on hold to compete in Operación Triunfo and later on focus on her career.

== Musical career ==
=== 2016–2023: Early career ===
At the age of 11, Panchyshyna participated in New Wave Junior 2016, the children's edition of the New Wave competition, in Gurzuf, Crimea, representing Belarus. The following year, she placed fourth in the Belarusian preselection for the Junior Eurovision Song Contest (2017), with the song "Tantsui so mnoy". She participated again with the group Monkey Tops in 2019, finishing in third place with the song "Posmotri na nas". That same year, she competed in the fifth edition of the Spanish reality talent show La Voz Kids, joining Rosario Flores' team, but she was eliminated in the battle round, finishing in seventh position.

=== 2023–2025: Operación Triunfo ===
In 2023, Ruslana participated in the twelfth edition of Operación Triunfo broadcast by Amazon Prime Video, where she performed songs such as "Zombie" by The Cranberries, "SloMo" by Chanel Terrero and "Salvaje" by Nathy Peluso, some of which she managed to position in her version in the Top 200 of Spotify Spain. She finished in third place in the competition, behind Naiara and Paul Thin.

Following the contest, Ruslana signed a contract with Universal Music Spain, and released her first single "Las chicas malas desafinan", which managed to enter the top 100 of the best-selling songs in Spain. In May 2024, "Lo mejor de Ruslana", her first compilation album, was released, which includes all the songs she sang in Operación Triunfo along with "Las chicas malas desafinan". It peaked at #4 on the Top 100 best-selling albums weekly in Spain. She was included alongside several of her Operación Triunfo mates in the official song for the 2024 Spanish Olympic team, titled "La Gravedad", which was released on May 8th.

In November 2024, she released her debut studio album “Génesis” which also reached number 4 on the official Spanish album chart. That same month, she embarked on the Génesis Tour to promote the album.

She made her acting debut on the dance film A fuego. Filming began on October 2025 and premiered on August 21st 2026.

=== 2026–present: Catarsis and ANOMIA ===
On February 12, 2026, she released Catarsis, her first EP, promoted with a small tour of 4 stops. She later confirmed that a full second studio album would follow Catarsis, which she had already begun teasing and writing while on tour. On May 19 she announced a new full tour on support of the album. The lead single “la favorita de la vida” was released on July 31st.

On September 2nd, she confirmed the album would be titled “ANOMIA”, and was released on October 9th.

== Musical style ==
Ruslana's music has elements of rock, R&B and soul. Her favorite groups include Måneskin and Coldplay. In addition to singing, she plays electric bass.

== Discography ==
==== Studio albums ====
- GÉNESIS (2024)
- ANOMIA (2026)

== Tours ==
==== Headlining tours ====
- Génesis Tour (2024-2025)
- Catarsis: donde lo efímero se vuelve eterno (2026)
- Anomia Tour (2026)

==== Co-headlining tours ====
- OT 2023 En Concierto (2024)

== Filmography ==
Television

Year	Title	Result
2016	New Wave Junior 2016	Contestant
2017	Song For Junior Eurovision 2017	4th place
2019	Song For Junior Eurovision 2019	3rd place as a member of Monkey Tops
2019	La Voz Kids	Contestant
2023–2024	Operación Triunfo 2023	3rd place

Film

Year	Title	Role
2026	A Fuego	Bego

== Awards and nominations ==
Award	Year	Recipient(s) and nominee(s)	Category	Result	Ref.
LOS40 Music Awards	2024	Ruslana	Best Spanish New Act	Won	
