= Lau Nau =

Finnish singer-songwriter

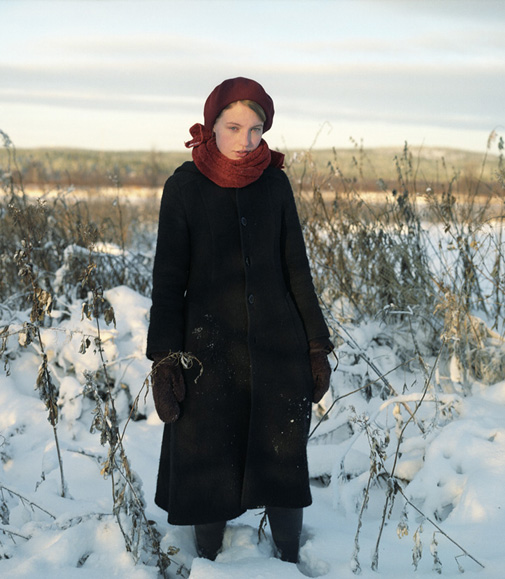

Background information
- Also known as: Lau Nau
- Born: Laura Naukkarinen; 1980 (age 45–46); Helsinki, Finland
- Origin: Finland
- Genres: Folk, psychedelic folk, experimental
- Occupations: Composer, musician, producer, singer, songwriter
- Instruments: voice, violin, guitar, keyboard, toy instruments, idiophones
- Years active: 2005–present
- Labels: Fonal Records, Locust, Beacon Sound, Yacca, Peippo, POK
- Website: http://launau.com

Laura Naukkarinen, known by her stage name Lau Nau (born 1980) is a composer, producer and musician from Finland. She also plays under the moniker Subatlantti, in IAX, a band formed with Kuupuu and Tsembla and is a visiting member of The Matti Bye Ensemble. She was also a member of free improv and psychedelic folk bands Kiila, Päivänsäde, the Anaksimandros, Avarus, Maailma, and the trio Hertta Lussu Ässä formed by fellow acid folk singer-songwriters Islaja and Kuupuu.

Besides of composing and producing her own albums, Lau Nau accompanies live silent films and composes music for feature films, theatre plays, dance and sound installations. Her instrumentation ranges from everyday objects to classical instruments and analog synthesizers.

She composed the soundtrack to the 2019 documentary Land Without God, directed by Mannix Flynn, Maedhbh McMahon and Lotta Petronella, as well as to Petronella's 2020 documentary Själö - Island of Souls. In 2025 she composed the soundtrack to Niina Suominen's experimental film Smoking Spot (Tupakkapaikka).

Lau Nau lives in the Finnish countryside of Kimito island with her husband and two sons.

== Discography ==
- Kuutarha (Locust, 2005)
- Nukkuu (Locust, 2008)
- Valohiukkanen, (Fonal, 2012)
- Hem. Någonstans (Fonal, 2015)
- Poseidon (Fonal, Beacon Sound, Yacca, 2017)
- Land Without God – Original Soundtrack (Fonal, 2019)
- Själö – Original Soundtrack (Fonal, 2020)
- Puutarhassa (Fonal, Akti Records, 2020)
- Live At Röykkälä (Beacon Sound, 2020)
- 5 x 4 (Fonal, Beacon Sound, 2023)
