= Soundtrack for Life =

Studio album by A:xus
- Released: 28 February 2000
- Recorded: 1998–2000
- Genre: Electronic; deep house; acid jazz
- Length: 62:24
- Label: Guidance
- Producer: Aba-cus; Raw Emotions; A:xus

Singles from Soundtrack for Life
- 1. "Abacus (When I Fall In Love)" Released: 1998; 2. "Baghdad Café (Calling You)" Released: 1999; 3. "You Make Me Feel Like (Peace & Love & Happiness)" Released: 2000

Soundtrack for Life is the only studio album by Canadian DJ A:xus. It was the first record to be released by Guidance Records, and includes the hit single "When I Fall In Love" by his alias "Abacus", which was a Top 75 hit in the UK. The track "Soundtrack 4 Life" is featured in Rockstar's Smuggler's Run as the main menu music.

== Critical reception ==
Professional ratings
Review scores
Source	Rating
AllMusic	4/5 stars
Blues & Soul	positive

The album was met with positive reviews. Allmusic commented that the album has "strong, clever production skills and a feel for musical variety that never sounds forced." A review by Blues & Soul felt that the album "fuses all the best parts of deep house with tinges of jazz, funk, ambient and garage to very good effect."

== Track listing ==
1. Baghdad Café (Callin' U) (6:51)
2. Raw Emotions (4:27)
3. My Planet Rocks (5:56)
4. Synchronicity (5:43)
5. Near or Far (3:34)
6. Pluto (5:58)
7. Oceans Between Us (2:35)
8. Soundtrack 4 Life (4:01)
9. Lazy, Crazy, Hazy Days (3:56)
10. Taxi Blues (4:05)
11. Nice to See You Again (3:32)
12. When I Fall In Love (Abacus) (5:42)
13. You Make Me Feel Like (Peace & Love & Happiness) (6:14)
