= Elia Barceló =

Spanish academic and author

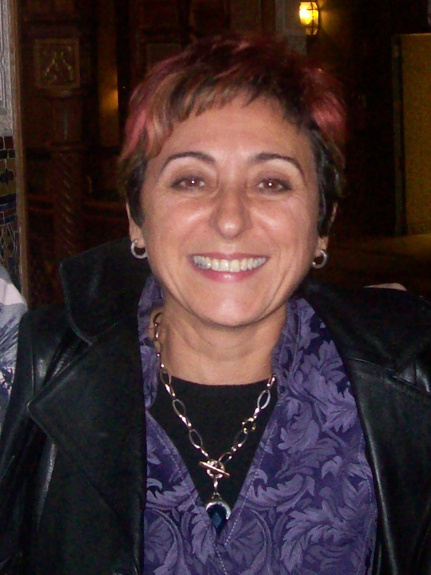
- Born: 29 January 1957 (age 69); Elda, Spain
- Occupation: academic then writer

Elia Barceló or Elia Eisterer-Barceló (born 29 January 1957) was a Spanish academic in Austria and she then became a successful full-time writer. She writes in different genres and her work has been adapted to screen.

== Life ==
Barceló was born in Elda in 1957. She became an academic and earned her doctorate in Innsbruck, Austria in 1995. She remained in Austria, working as a professor of Spanish literature. She has won a number of awards.

== Literary genre and topics ==
She started writing science fiction in 1981. She is well regarded as an SF writer in Spanish She continued to publish crime, horror, gothic and historical fiction novels as well as essays.

Her work has been translated into French, Italian, German, Catalan, English, Greek, Hungarian, Dutch, Danish, Norwegian, Swedish, Croatian, Portuguese, Hebrew, Basque, Ukrainian, Czech, Russian and Esperanto. Memory, love and death are recurring themes in her work, where she also vindicates the role of mature women.

Her Heart of Tango was published in an English translation in 2010.

In 2018 she published Las largas sombras which is a story based around a group of women friends who discover the remains of a friend who disappeared two decades before. The story has since been adapted into the streaming series Past Lies by Clara Roquet.

Her horror story, Frankenstein Effect, won the 2022 Hache prize after a popular vote by young readers. The story is based around time travel where discrimination can be seen and its concludes with a nod to the work of Mary Shelley who invented the Frankenstein monster. In 2022 she was invited to Cartagena and "Cartegena Negra" to appear in a round table with Empar Fernández, María Suré and Teresa Cardona.

== Awards ==
- Premio Ignotus, science fiction, 1991
- Premio TP de oro, young adult literature, 1997 and 2006
- Premio Internacional, science fiction novella, Polytechnic University of Catalonia (Premio UPC), 1993
- Premio Celsius, 2014
- Premio Ignotus, 2018
- Premio Edebé, children's and young adult literature
- Hache prize, 2022 for The Frankenstein Effect.

== Works ==
  - Sagrada. Ediciones B, Barcelona, 1989.
  - Consecuencias Naturales. Madrid, 1994.
  - El mundo de Yarek, premio UPC 1993, Barcelona, 1994. Editorial Lengua de Trapo .
  - El caso del Artista Cruel, premio Edebé, 1998.
  - La mano de Fatma, 2001.
  - El vuelo del hipogrifo, 2002. Editorial Lengua de Trapo.
  - El caso del crimen de la ópera, 2002.
  - El secreto del orfebre, 2003. Editorial Lengua de Trapo.
  - Si un día vuelves a Brasil, 2003. Alba Editorial.
  - Disfraces terribles. Barcelona, 2004. Editorial Lengua de Trapo.
  - El contrincante, 2004.
  - Cordeluna, Premio Edebé de Literatura Infantil y Juvenil, 2007.
  - Corazón de Tango, 2007. Ed. 451 Editores.
  - El almacén de las palabras terribles, Zaragoza: Edelvives, 2007.
  - Caballeros de Malta, 2007. Edebé-Periscopio.
  - La roca de Is, 2010, Edebé-Edición Nómadas.
  - Las largas sombras, 2009. Ediciones Ámbar (reed. Roca, 2018)
  - Anima mundi, 2013. Ediciones Destino.
  - Por ti daré mi vida, 2015. Edebé.
  - La Maga y otros cuentos crueles, 2015. Cazador de ratas.
  - El color del silencio, 2017, ed. Roca.
  - El eco de la piel, 2019, ed. Roca.
  - El efecto Frankenstein, 2019, ed. Edebé.
  - La noche de plata, 2020, Roca Editorial.
  - Muerte en Santa Rita, 2021, Roca Editorial.
  - Amores que matan, 2023, Roca Editorial.
  - El síndrome Frankenstein, 2023, Edebé.
  - La soga de cristal, 2024, Roca Editorial.
