= Spanish Girl's Club =

Football club in Spain active in 1914

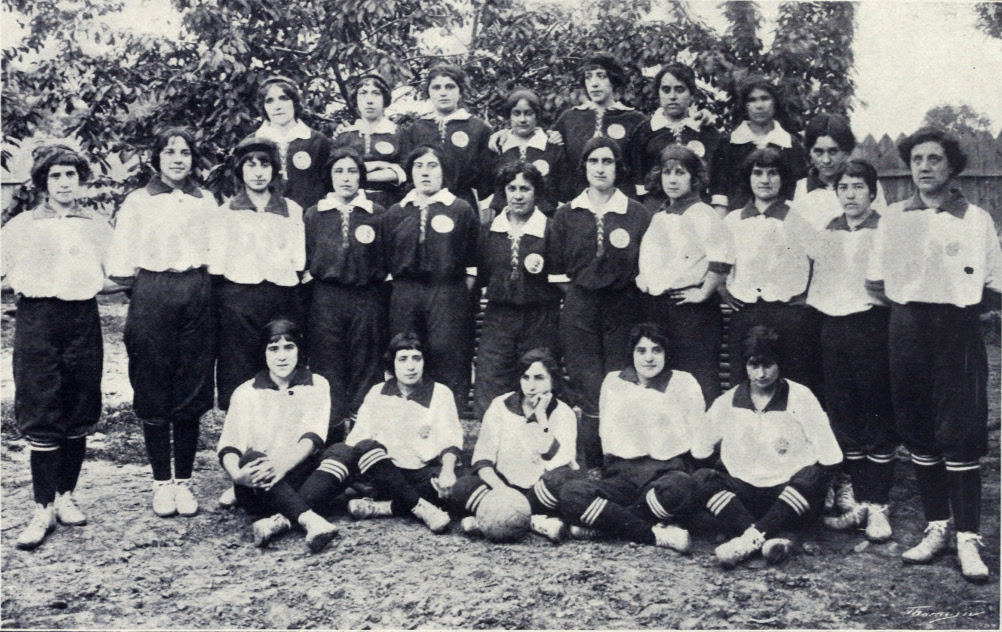
- Football players from the Spanish Girl's Club
- Full name: Spanish Girl's Club
- Founded: June 1914
Home colours

The Spanish Girl's Club was a women's football club based in Barcelona, Spain, which was founded in 1914 and dissolved shortly thereafter. Despite its brief existence, the club retained a place in history as the first women's football team in Spain and being considered one of the pioneering women's football teams in Catalonia. The club had two teams, Montserrat and Giralda, which typically played against each other in exhibition games.

== Founding ==
At the beginning of the 20th century, Spain was a hostile place for women's sports, with women having a low status in society and considered physically incapable. The Spanish Girl's Club was created in 1914, spearheaded by the former RCD Espanyol and FC Barcelona footballer Paco Bru. A 1960 report suggested that the club was a joint venture of FC Barcelona through Jack Greenwell and RCD Espanyol through Bru.

The club was inspired by women's teams playing in England, while earlier in 1914, a men's football team in Barcelona had a board of exclusively women. Despite being a small football association, it was well organised and had its own headquarters, at the Barcelona premises of L'Amistat company on Consell de Cent Street. The club's first coach was the Englishman Jack Greenwell, who at the time was also player-coach of the Barcelona men's team, with Bru taking coaching duties later on; according to Bru's account, he believed Greenwell left the coaching role due to players' overbearing mothers coming to the club.

Spanish Girl's Club featured two teams, which played against each other, called Montserrat and Giralda. Montserrat was named after the Montserrat mountain range and monastery in Catalonia, and Giralda was likely named after Giralda, the iconic bell tower in Seville that became so popular in Catalonia that a replica was constructed in L'Arboç.

== Response ==
The club was immediately controversial – later reported as what would be expected of Spain at the time – with press reactions ranging from shock and sympathy to machismo and misogyny. Male relatives of the players also protested their involvement, especially when Bru said the players would wear shorts to be comfortable and shower after playing to be hygienic; the male relatives felt they were entitled to give or deny permission for such things.

The most consistent negative response to the club was a slur used throughout its existence, the Spanish "marimachos"; literally translated as "tomboys", the Spanish term is derogatory and often used as a euphemistic derogatory reference to lesbians and butch women. The term was used for many women who had an interest in sports, with Bru trying to get people to think of the players as sportswomen instead, a new concept.

In the days before the first match, promotion of it caused increased attention, and more spectators than expected showed up. Mixed reports on the match from the time indicate that it was considered important and that there was sporting quality, though such reports still had misogynistic hallmarks. There were other negative views towards the club due to the vast majority of people considering football to be exclusively a men's sport, and that women could play other sports if they wanted. As the club was specifically created as "a solidarity project", there were more critical voices.

According to a report from 1960, the club was popular and its matches successful enough that a company sponsored a trophy match for the teams.

== Matches ==
After 45 days of training, while also overcoming detractors, Greenwell considered the teams prepared for a match in public. The first women's football match in Spain was played on 9 June 1914 at 17:15, on the pitch of RCD Espanyol. Montserrat played in white and Giralda played in red; Bru refereed and Giralda won 2–1. The match raised funds to support the Women's Federation Against Tuberculosis (Federación Femenina contra la Tuberculosis), and was attended by this organisation's president, César del Villar, and his daughter Carmen. The players included: Emilia Paños, Concha Ferrer, Dolores, Dorotea Alonos, Juanita Paño, Mercedes Azul, Palermo, Esperanza, Mercedes Queralt and Narcisa Colomer. As well as Spanish, the team also had English and French players. Emilia Paños was the goalkeeper for Montserrat, with La Vanguardia noting her "premonitory" surname in 2019 (in reference to goalkeeper Sandra Paños).

The teams played seven matches, in and around the Province of Barcelona, in the summer of 1914. The 11 June match saw the teams draw 1–1, and on 14 June Montserrat won 4–1. They played in Mataró on 21 June, and on 29 June back in Barcelona, Montserrat won 2–1. On 6 July, Giralda won 2–0.

In 1960, El Noticiero Universal reported that a later match between the club's teams had been so hotly contested that it broke out into a vicious fight with spectators joining in; this could only be resolved by the intervention of the local police, and the club received a fine of 200 pesetas.

== Decline and collapse ==
Despite becoming popular and playing well enough that one sports paper said they would soon be able to compete with men's second or youth teams, Spanish Girl's Club did not last long. Their fortunes seemed to rest on a planned tour of France to play women's teams there, which was cancelled due to the outbreak of World War I, and Spanish Girl's Club stopped playing; their last match had been 6 July 1914. Bru reportedly made the sarcastic comment that, after Belgium, the Spanish Girl's Club was the first victim of World War I; this statement has also been attributed to journalist Joan Garcia Castell.

Local newspapers continued to report on the women's teams in England, and suggested that women's football would soon reach Spain, but sportsmen and sport advocates in Spain espoused the belief that it was too dangerous or masculine.

== See also ==
- Club Femení i d'Esports de Barcelona
