= Nuspirit Helsinki =

- Origin: Helsinki, Finland
- Genres: Broken beat, Electronica, Hip hop, House, Jazz, Nu-jazz, Soul
- Years active: 1998–present
- Label: Guidance Recordings
- Website: Nuspirit Helsinki

Nuspirit Helsinki is a musical collective from Finland. The group was conceived in 1998 by Tuomas Kallio and Hannu Nieminen. Their eponymous debut was released in 2002 via the Guidance Recordings imprint. In 2008, the group released Our Favorite Things. Nuspirit Helsinki, no longer active as a band, now serves as an umbrella for other projects.

The work of the group has been remixed by various artists including Jazzanova and Jori Hulkkonen.

== Collaborators ==
- Chuck Perkins
- Ona Kamu
- Lisa Shaw
- Kasio
- Kim Rantala
- Nicole Willis

== Discography ==
- Nuspirit Helsinki (2002)
- Our Favorite Things (2008)
