= TV-resistori =

Finnish indie rock band

TV-resistori is an Indie rock band from Turku, Finland.

The band's seventh studio album, Serkut Rakastaa Paremmin, received a rating score of seven from PopMatters.

== Discography ==
- Tv-Resistori (2011)
- Petit Pianista, 7" (2001)
- Melodi Melodika, cassette (2003)
- Melodi Melodika, 7"(2003)
- Intiaanidisko (2004)
- TV-resistori/Islaja Split, 7" (2006)
- Serkut rakastaa paremmin (2006)
