= Club Femení i d'Esports de Barcelona =

Sporting club in Spain active between 1928 and 1939

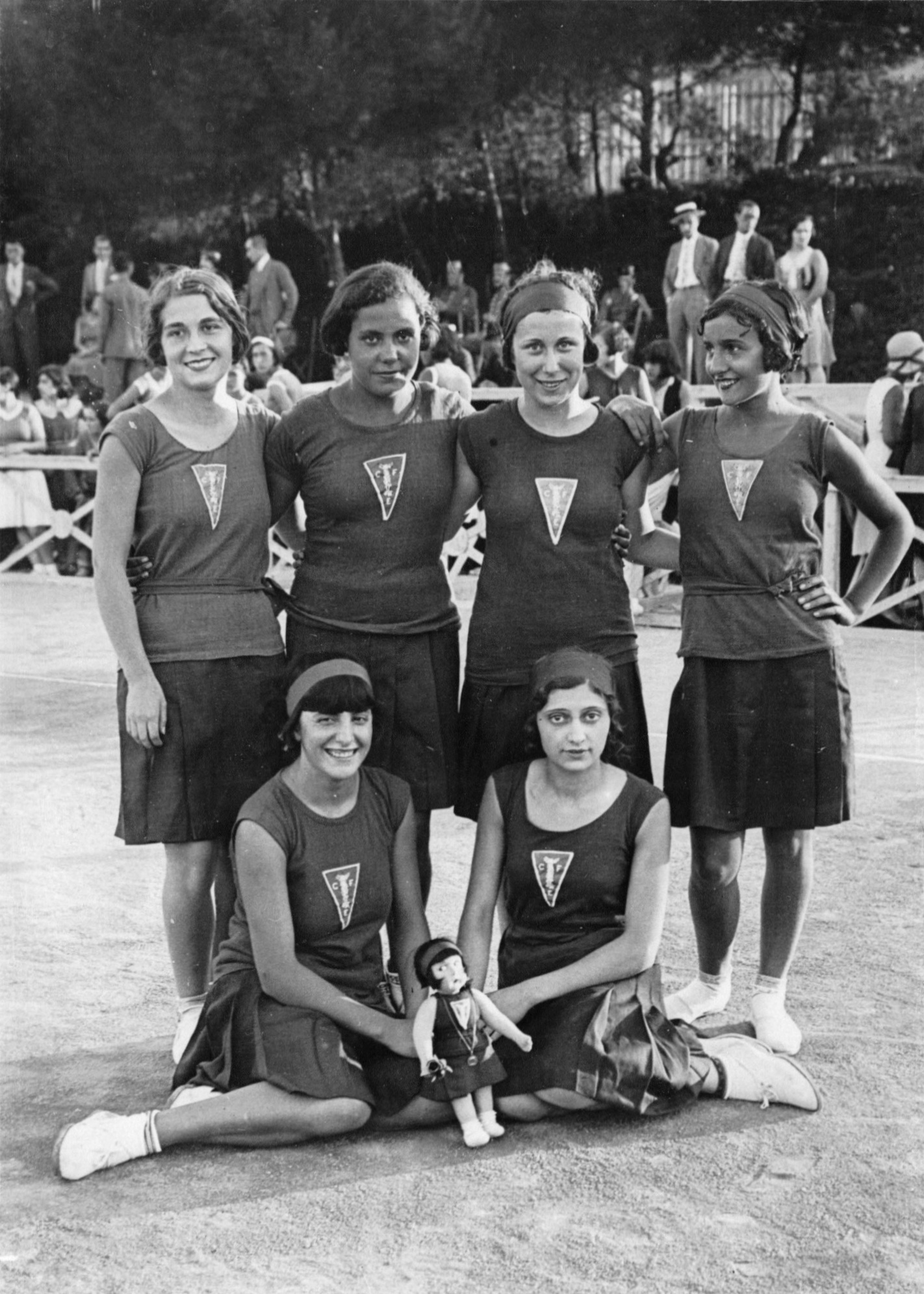
- The club's basketball team on 13 July 1930 at the Barcelona Exhibition Tournament
- Full name: Club Femení i d'Esports de Barcelona
- Founded: 14 October 1928
- Dissolved: 1939

The Club Femení i d'Esports de Barcelona was the most important sports and feminist organisation in pre-war Barcelona, linked to progressive and Catalanist political proposals. The club was founded on the initiative of Teresa Torrens and Enriqueta Sèculi on 14 October 1928, a few years before the other important cultural space for women in the city during the 1930s, the Lyceum Club. The latter followed a European model and was frequented by intellectuals, while the Club Femení i d'Esports was the first exclusively female sports organisation in Spain, with an aim to being accessible to all women.

In December 1928, shortly after its foundation, the Club already had five hundred members and on 1 May 1929, there were already one thousand.

== See also ==
- Spanish Girl's Club – a women's football club founded in Barcelona in 1914
