= Guidance Recordings =

- Founded: June 29, 1996; 30 years ago
- Genre: House
- Country of origin: United States
- Location: Chicago, Illinois

Guidance Recordings was a house music record label based in Chicago, Illinois.

The record label was founded in Summer of 1996 by Ivan Pavlovich, Rob Kouchoukos, Sid Stary and Kelly McNeer.

The label has released a great number of compilation albums in the subgenre of deep house, with the strains of soulful electronic music, nu-jazz, funk, Afro-Caribbean, Latin, electro, synth-punk, Electronic Rock, West Coast Hip Hop. Garage, Acoustic, Drum and Bass, and broken beat rhythms. One of their most illustrious and memorable productions was the Hi-Fidelity House Imprint series, which lasted for five volumes, featuring homegrown artists such as Nuspirit Helsinki, and guest appearances like tracks from Dubtribe Sound System.

== Artists ==
- A:xus (Soundtrack for Life)
- Alpine Stars
- Bent
- Boo Williams
- Common Nature
- Deep Sensation
- Flunk
- Fresh & Low
- Grey
- Groove Corporation
- Glenn Underground
- Kasio
- Nuspirit Helsinki
- The Dolphins
- Paul Hunter Of the Red Hook Project
- Projekt:p.m. Also known as Artek606 of 606 Entertainment Music
- Soul Brother Six Combo
- Troublemakers
- The Dining Rooms
- Caia

== See also ==
- List of record labels
- List of electronic music record labels
