= Kemialliset Ystävät =

Finnish alternative music band, operating since 1995

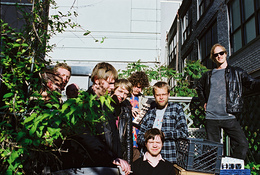
- Kemialliset Ystävät in 2008

Background information
- Origin: Tampere, Finland
- Genres: Experimental, folk
- Years active: 1995-present
- Labels: Fonal Records, Fat Cat Records
- Members: Jan Anderzén
- Website: www.kemiallisetystavat.com

Kemialliset Ystävät (Finnish for "Chemical Friends") is the name of a recording project of musician Jan Anderzén of Tampere, Finland. Anderzén began recording under the name in 1995 and although he has enlisted numerous musicians over the years, most Kemialliset Ystävät recordings are solo productions. Often labeled as psychedelic folk, his recordings have included such diverse instruments as detuned guitars, mandolins, balalaikas, toys, hand percussion, and samples from recordings by Sun Ra, Karlheinz Stockhausen and Vibracathedral Orchestra.

== Discography ==
- Kellari Juniversumi CD (Fonal Records, 2002)
- Alkuhärkä CD (Fonal Records, 2004)
- Latvasta Laho CD (Celebrate Psi Phenomenon Records, 2005)
- Lumottu Karkkipurkki CD-reissue (Fonal Records, 2005)
- Kemialliset ystävät CD/LP/MC (Fonal Records, 2007)
- Kemialliset ystävät / Sunroof! (Split #19) CD/DD (Fat Cat Records, 2008)
- June (Tomutonttu feat. Henkka) (2009)
- Ullakkopalo CD/LP/DD (Fonal Records, 2010)
- Alas Rattoisaa Virtaa CD/LP/DD (Dekorder Records, 2014)
- Siipi Empii LP (Ikuisuus, 2018) / Cass (Leaving Records, 2018)
