= Ana Carmona (footballer) =

Spanish footballer (1908–1940)

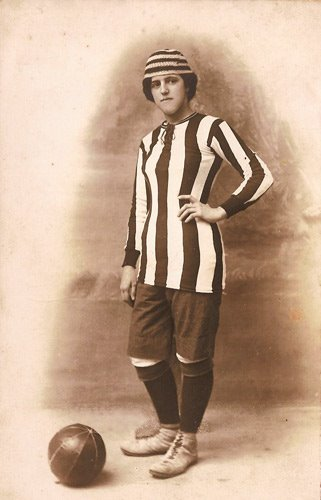
Image of Ana Ruiz

Ana Carmona Ruiz (1908–1940) was a Spanish footballer who played as a midfielder. She was nicknamed "Nita" and "Veleta". In the 1920s, she dressed up as a male to be able to play on male football teams. She played successfully for a while, but when she was discovered to be a woman, she was attacked and punished with house arrest.
