= 71st CEC Awards =

Spanish film awards

- Date: 1 February 2016
- Site: Cine Palafox, Madrid, Spain
- Hosted by: Elena Furiase; Canco Rodríguez
- Organized by: Círculo de Escritores Cinematográficos

Highlights
- Most awards: Truman (5)
- Most nominations: The Bride (8)

The 71st CEC Medals ceremony, presented by the Círculo de Escritores Cinematográficos, took place on 1 February 2016 at the Cine Palafox in Madrid. The gala was hosted by Elena Furiase and Canco Rodríguez.

== Winners and nominees ==
The winners and nominees are listed as follows:

Best Film: Truman; The Bride; Food and Shelter; Retribution; A Perfect Day	Best Animation Film: Capture the Flag; Meñique; Yoko and His Friends; Pos eso
Best Director: Cesc Gay – Truman; Fernando León de Aranoa – A Perfect Day; Paula Ortiz – The Bride; Julio Medem – Ma Ma	Best New Director: Dani de la Torre – Retribution; Juan Miguel del Castillo – Food and Shelter; Leticia Dolera – Requirements to Be a Normal Person; Daniel Guzmán – Nothing in Return
Best Original Screenplay: Cesc Gay, Tomàs Aragay – Truman; Daniel Guzmán – Nothing in Return; Albert Marini – Retribution; Juan Miguel del Castillo – Food and Shelter	Best Adapted Screenplay: Paula Ortiz, Javier García Arredondo – The Bride; Fernando León de Aranoa, Diego Farias – A Perfect Day; Jordi Casanovas, David Ilundáin – B; Fernando Navarro, Pablo Alén, Breixo Corral – Spy Time; Sergio G. Sánchez – Palm Trees in the Snow
Best Actor: Ricardo Darín – Truman; Luis Tosar – Retribution; Pedro Casablanc – B; Benicio del Toro – A Perfect Day	Best Actress: Natalia de Molina – Food and Shelter; Inma Cuesta – The Bride; Penélope Cruz – Ma Ma; Nora Navas – The Adoption
Best Supporting Actor: Javier Cámara – Truman; Manolo Solo – B; Mario Casas – My Big Night; Quim Gutiérrez – Spy Time; Luis Tosar – Ma Ma	Best Supporting Actress: Luisa Gavasa – The Bride; Elvira Mínguez – Retribution; Mariana Cordero – Food and Shelter; Marian Álvarez – Happy 140
Best New Actor: Manuel Burque – Requirements to Be a Normal Person; Fernando Colomo – Isla bonita; Miguel Herrán – Nothing in Return; Juan del Santo – Flow	Best New Actress: Irene Escolar – An Autumn Without Berlin; Antonia Guzmán – Nothing in Return; Iraia Elias – Amama; Olivia Delcán – Isla bonita; Paula del Río – Retribution
Best Cinematography: Migue Amoedo – The Bride; Xavi Giménez – Palm Trees in the Snow; Jean-Claude Larrieu – Endless Night; Alex Catalán – A Perfect Day	Best Editing: Jorge Coira – Retribution; David Gallart – Requirements to Be a Normal Person; Nacho Ruiz Capillas – A Perfect Day; Javier García – The Bride
Best Music: Shigeru Umebayashi – The Bride; Lucas Vidal – Endless Night; Alberto Iglesias – Ma Ma; Roque Baños – Regression	Best Documentary Film: The Propaganda Game; I Am Your Father; Chicas nuevas 24 horas; Boxing for Freedom
Best Foreign Film: Inside Out; Bridge of Spies; Whiplash; Leviathan

== Special awards ==
- Honorary Medal: Pepa Flores
- Medal for the Promotion of Cinema Merit: Historia de nuestro cine (TVE)
- Medal for the Journalistic Merit: Enrique Herreros
