= 3rd Platino Awards =

- Date: July 24, 2016
- Site: Centro de Convenciones in Punta del Este, Uruguay
- Hosted by: Natalia Oreiro, Santiago Segura, Adal Ramones

Highlights
- Best Film: Embrace of the Serpent
- Best Actor: Guillermo Francella; The Clan
- Best Actress: Dolores Fonzi; Paulina
- Most awards: Embrace of the Serpent (7)
- Most nominations: Embrace of the Serpent, Ixcanul (8)

The 3rd Platino Awards were presented at the Centro de Convenciones in Punta del Este, Uruguay on July 24, 2016, to honour the best in Ibero-American films of 2015.

Embrace of the Serpent and Ixcanul received the most nominations with eight each one.

Embrace of the Serpent won seven awards including Best Ibero-American Film and Platino Award for Best Director for Ciro Guerra.

== Winners and nominees ==
=== Major awards ===
Best Ibero-American Film: Embrace of the Serpent; The Clan; The Club; Ixcanul; Truman	Best Director: Ciro Guerra – Embrace of the Serpent; Alonso Ruizpalacios – Güeros; Cesc Gay – Truman; Pablo Larraín – The Club; Pablo Trapero – The Clan
Best Actor: Guillermo Francella – The Clan as Arquímedes Puccio; Alfredo Castro – The Club as padre Vidal; Damián Alcázar – Magallanes as Harvey Magallanes; Javier Cámara – Truman as Tomás; Ricardo Darín – Truman as Julián	Best Actress: Dolores Fonzi – Paulina as Paulina; Antonia Zegers – The Club as madre Mónica; Elena Anaya – The Memory of Water as Amanda; Inma Cuesta – The Bride as the Bride; Penélope Cruz – Ma Ma as Magda
Best Screenplay: The Club – Pablo Larraín, Guillermo Calderón & Daniel Villalobos; Embrace of the Serpent – Ciro Guerra & Jacques Toulemonde; Ixcanul – Jayro Bustamante; Magallanes – Salvador del Solar; Truman – Cesc Gay & Tomás Agaray	Best Original Score: Embrace of the Serpent – Nascuy Linares; Ixcanul – Pascual Reyes; Ma Ma – Alberto Iglesias; Magallanes – Federico Jusid; Nobody Wants the Night – Lucas Vidal
Best Animated Film: Capture the Flag; Top Cat Begins; El Americano: The Movie; La Leyenda de las Momias; El secreto de Amila; Un gallo con muchos huevos	Best Documentary: The Pearl Button; Beyond My Grandfather Allende; Chicas nuevas 24 horas; La once; The Propaganda Game
Best Cinematography: Embrace of the Serpent – David Gallego; The Club – Sergio Armstrong; Ixcanul – Luis Armando Arteaga; The Memory of Water – Arnaldo Rodríguez; The Bride – Miguel Ángel Amoedo	Best Art Direction: Embrace of the Serpent – Angélica Perea; The Clan – Sebastián Orgambide; Arabian Nights Volume 2: The Desolate One – Bruno Duarte & Artur Pinheiro; Ixcanul – Pilar Peredo; The Bride – Jesús Bosqued Maté & Pilar Quintana
Best Editing: Embrace of the Serpent – Etienne Boussac & Cristina Gallego; The Clan – Pablo Trapero & Alejandro Carrillo Penovi; Retribution – Jorge Coira; Ixcanul – César Díaz; Magallanes – Eric Williams	Best Sound: Embrace of the Serpent – Carlos García & Marco Salavería; The Clan – Vicente D'Elía & Leandro de Loredo; Retribution – David Machado, Jaime Fernández & Nacho Arenas; Ixcanul – Eduardo Cáceres & Julien Cloquet; Paulina – Federico Equerro, Santiago Fumagalli & Edson Secco
Best Ibero-American First Film: Ixcanul; 600 Miles; Retribution; El patrón: radiografía de un crimen; Magallanes

=== Platino Award for Film and Education Values ===
- The Second Mother • Brazil

=== Honorary Platino ===
- Ricardo Darín

== Films with multiple nominations and awards ==
The following films received multiple nominations:

Nominations	Film
8	Embrace of the Serpent
8	Ixcanul
6	The Club
5	The Clan
5	Magallanes
5	Truman
3	Retribution
3	The Bride
2	The Memory of Water
2	Paulina
2	Ma Ma

The following films received multiple awards:

Awards	Film
7	Embrace of the Serpent
