= 3rd Feroz Awards =

2016 Spanish film and television awards

- Date: January 19, 2016
- Site: Teatro Príncipe Pío, Madrid
- Hosted by: Silvia Abril
- Organized by: Asociación de Informadores Cinematográficos de España

Highlights
- Best Picture: The Bride (Drama); Negotiator (Comedy)
- Best Direction: Paula Ortiz; The Bride
- Best Actor: Ricardo Darín; Truman
- Best Actress: Inma Cuesta; The Bride
- Most awards: The Bride (6)
- Most nominations: The Bride (9)

Television coverage
- Network: Canal+

The 3rd award ceremony of Premios Feroz was held at the Teatro Príncipe Pío in Madrid, on January 19, 2016. It was hosted by comedian and actress Silvia Abril and aired on Canal+.

== Winners and nominees ==
The nominations were announced on December 9, 2015. Later in December, B, la película was disclosed in advance as the recipient of the Special Award. The winners and nominees are listed as follows:

Best Drama Film: The Bride; Nothing in Return; Retribution; Food and Shelter; Truman	Best Comedy Film: Negotiator; Spy Time; A Perfect Day; My Big Night; Requirements to Be a Normal Person
Best Director: Paula Ortiz — The Bride; Cesc Gay — Truman; Daniel Guzmán — Nothing in Return; Fernando León de Aranoa — A Perfect Day; Dani de la Torre — Retribution	Best Screenplay: Cesc Gay, Tomàs Aragay — Truman; Borja Cobeaga — Negotiator; Paula Ortiz, Javier García Arredondo — The Bride; Fernando León de Aranoa — A Perfect Day; Daniel Guzmán — Nothing in Return
Best Main Actor: Ricardo Darín — Truman; Ramón Barea — Negotiator; Javier Cámara — Truman; Pedro Casablanc — B; Luis Tosar — Retribution	Best Main Actress: Inma Cuesta — The Bride; Penélope Cruz — Ma Ma; Irene Escolar — An Autumn Without Berlin; Natalia de Molina — Food and Shelter; Nora Navas — The Adoption
Best Supporting Actor: Mario Casas — My Big Night; Carlos Álvarez-Nóvoa — The Bride; Antonio Bachiller — Nothing in Return; Quim Gutiérrez — Spy Time; Javier Gutiérrez — Retribution	Best Supporting Actress: Luisa Gavasa — The Bride; Marian Álvarez — Felices 140; Dolores Fonzi — Truman; Elvira Mínguez — Retribution; Blanca Suárez — My Big Night
Best Original Soundtrack: Shigeru Umebayashi — The Bride; Roque Baños — Regression; Javier Rodero — Spy Time; Alberto Iglesias — Ma Ma; Lucas Vidal — Palm Trees in the Snow	Best Trailer: The Bride; Spy Time; Retribution; My Big Night; Requirements to Be a Normal Person
Best Film Poster: Requirements to Be a Normal Person; The Apostate; A Perfect Day; The Romantic Exiles; Negotiator; The Bride

== Honorary Award ==
- Honorary Feroz Award: Rosa María Sardá

== Special Award ==
- Special Award: B, la película

== See also ==
- 30th Goya Awards
