= List of Spanish films of 2015 =

A list of Spanish-produced and co-produced feature films released in 2015 in Spain. When applicable, the domestic theatrical release date is favoured.

== Films ==
Release		Title (Domestic title)	Cast & Crew	Distribution label	Ref.
J A N U A R Y	30	Sidetracked (Las ovejas no pierden el tren)	Director: Álvaro Fernández Armero Cast: Raúl Arévalo, Inma Cuesta, Alberto San Juan, Candela Peña, Jorge Bosch, Irene Escolar, Kiti Mánver	eOne Films	
F E B R U A R Y	27	Wax (Cera)	Director: Víctor Matellano Cast: Jack Taylor, Geraldine Chaplin, Jimmy Shaw	Selected Films	
M A R C H	6	Off Course (Perdiendo el norte)	Director: Nacho García Velilla Cast: Yon González, Julián López, Blanca Suárez, Malena Alterio, Úrsula Corberó, Miki Esparbé, Younes Bachir, Javier Cámara, Carmen Machi, José Sacristán	Warner Bros. Pictures	
M A R C H	13	Negotiator (Negociador)	Director: Borja Cobeaga Cast: Ramón Barea, Josean Bengoetxea, Carlos Areces, Jons Pappila, Óscar Ladoire, Raúl Arévalo, Secun de la Rosa, Gorka Aguinalde, Santi Ugalde, Alejandro Tejería, Maria Cruickshank, Melina Matthews	Avalon	
A P R I L	10	Happy 140 (Felices 140)	Director: Gracia Querejeta Cast: Maribel Verdú, Antonio de la Torre, Eduard Fernández, Nora Navas, Marian Álvarez, Álex O'Dogherty, Paula Cancio, Marcos Ruiz, Ginés García Millán	Sony Pictures	
A P R I L	24	Girl's Night Out (Cómo sobrevivir a una despedida)	Director: Manuela Moreno Cast: Natalia de Molina, Úrsula Corberó, María Hervás, Celia de Molina, Brays Efe	DeAPlaneta	
A P R I L	24	Easy Sex, Sad Movies (Sexo fácil, películas tristes)	Director: Alejo Flah Cast: Ernesto Alterio, Quim Gutiérrez, Marta Etura, Julieta Cardinali, Carlos Areces, Bárbara Santa-Cruz	Filmax	(Note: Co-production Spain–Argentina (76%–24%).)
A P R I L	24	Dying Beyond Their Means (Murieron por encima de sus posibilidades)	Director: Isaki Lacuesta Cast: Raúl Arévalo, Imanol Arias, Bruno Bergonzini, Alex Brendemühl, José Coronado, Eduard Fernández, Ariadna Gil, Bárbara Lennie, Sergi López, Carmen Machi, Ángela Molina, Àlex Monner, Albert Pla, José María Pou, José Sacristán, Emma Suárez, Luis Tosar, Iván Telefunken, Jordi Vilches, Julián Villagrán	Versus Entertainment	
A P R I L	24	Breathless Time (Tiempo sin aire)	Director: Samuel Martín Mateos, Andrés Luque Pérez Cast: Juana Acosta, Carmelo Gómez, Toni Acosta, Juan Pablo Shuk, Félix Gómez	Syldavia Cinema	
M A Y	8	Nothing in Return (A cambio de nada)	Director: Daniel Guzmán Cast: Miguel Herrán, Antonio Bachiller, Felipe Vélez, Luis Tosar, Miguel Rellán	Warner Bros. Pictures	
M A Y	8	Sweet Home	Director: Rafa Martínez Cast: Ingrid García Jonsson, Bruno Sevilla	Filmax	
M A Y	15	Sicarivs: La noche y el silencio	Director: Javier Muñoz Cast: Israel Elejalde, María Cecilia Sánchez, Víctor Clavijo, Fernando Gil	World Line Cinema	
M A Y	22	The Gunman (Caza al asesino)	Director: Pierre Morel Cast: Idris Elba, Sean Penn, Javier Bardem, Ray Winstone, Mark Rylance, Melina Matthews, Jasmine Trinca	DeAPlaneta	
M A Y	29	Killing Time (Matar el tiempo)	Director: Antonio Hernández Cast: Ben Temple, Esther Méndez, Aitor Luna, Yon González, Luisa Martín	World Line Cinema	
J U N E	4	Requirements To Be A Normal Person (Requisitos para ser una persona normal)	Director: Leticia Dolera Cast: Leticia Dolera, Manuel Burque, Alexandra Jiménez	A Contracorriente Films	
J U N E	12	Hablar	Director: Joaquín Oristrell Cast: Goya Toledo, Marta Etura, Miguel Ángel Muñoz, María Botto, Juan Diego Botto, Raúl Arévalo, Sergio Peris-Mencheta, Estefanía de los Santos, Antonio de la Torre, Mercedes Sampietro, Carmen Balagué, Secun de la Rosa, Melanie Olivares, Álex García	Splendor Films	
J U N E	19	It's Now or Never (Ahora o nunca)	Director: María Ripoll Cast: Dani Rovira, María Valverde, Gracia Olayo, Joaquín Núñez, Jordi Sánchez, Melody Ruiz, Yolanda Ramos, Clara Lago	Sony Pictures	
J U L Y	3	Innocent Killers (Asesinos inocentes)	Director: Gonzalo Bendala Cast: Maxi Iglesias, Miguel Ángel Solá, Aura Garrido, Luis Fernández, Javier Hernández, Alvar Gordejuela	Filmax	
J U L Y	17	Gipsy King (Rey gitano)	Director: Juanma Bajo Ulloa Cast: Manuel Manquiña, Karra Elejalde, Arturo Valls, María León, Rosa Mª Sardá, Charo López, Pilar Bardem, Albert Pla	eOne Films	
J U L Y	24	Just a Little Chemistry (Solo química)	Director: Alfonso Albacete Cast: Ana Carlota Fernández, Alejo Sauras, Rodrigo Guirao, José Coronado, Bibi Andersen, Rossy de Palma, Silvia Marsó, Neus Asensi, Natalia de Molina, María Esteve	Alfa Pictures	
A U G U S T	14	Extinction	Director: Miguel Ángel Vivas Cast: Matthew Fox, Jeffrey Donovan	Sony Pictures	(Note: Co-production Spain–Hungary (80%–20%).)
A U G U S T	14	No Kids (Sin hijos)	Director: Ariel Winograd Cast: Maribel Verdú, Diego Peretti	Syldavia Cinema	
A U G U S T	28	Capture the Flag (Atrapa la bandera)	Director: Enrique Gato	Paramount Pictures	
A U G U S T	28	A Perfect Day (Un día perfecto)	Director: Fernando León de Aranoa Cast: Benicio del Toro, Tim Robbins, Olga Kurylenko, Mélanie Thierry, Feđa Štukan	Universal Pictures	
S E P T E M B E R	4	Spy Time (Anacleto: agente secreto)	Director: Javier Ruiz Caldera Cast: Imanol Arias, Quim Gutiérrez, Berto Romero, Alexandra Jiménez, Carlos Areces, Emilio Gutiérrez Caba	Warner Bros. Pictures	
S E P T E M B E R	11	Ma Ma (Ma ma)	Director: Julio Medem Cast: Penélope Cruz, Luis Tosar, Asier Etxeandia, Teo Planell, Silvia Abascal, Alex Brendemühl	eOne Films	
S E P T E M B E R	11	The Romantic Exiles (Los exiliados románticos)	Director: Jonás Trueba Cast: Vito Sanz, Francesco Carril, Luis E. Parés, Renata Antonante, Isabelle Stoffel, Vahina Giocante	Cine Binario	
S E P T E M B E R	11	The Heroes of Evil (Los héroes del mal)	Director: Zoe Berriatúa Cast: Beatriz Medina, Emilio Palacios, Jorge Clemente	Sony Pictures	
S E P T E M B E R	25	Retribution (El desconocido)	Director: Dani de la Torre Cast: Luis Tosar, Javier Gutiérrez, Goya Toledo	Warner Bros. Pictures	
S E P T E M B E R	25	Girl Gets Girl (De chica en chica)	Director: Sonia Sebastián Cast: María Botto, Celia Freijeiro, Jane Badler	Versus Entertainment	
O C T O B E R	2	Regression (Regresión)	Director: Alejandro Amenábar Cast: Emma Watson, Ethan Hawke	Universal Pictures	(Note: Co-production Spain–Canada (58%–42%).)
O C T O B E R	2	The Apostate (El apóstata)	Director: Federico Veiroj Cast: Bárbara Lennie, Vicky Peña, Marta Larralde, Álvaro Ogalla, Jaime Chávarri, Joaquín Climent	Avalon	
O C T O B E R	9	Death of a Fisherman (A praia dos afogados)	Director: Gerardo Herrero Cast: Carmelo Gómez, Antonio Garrido, Luis Zahera, Celia Freijeiro, Celso Bugallo, Pedro Alonso, Marta Larralde, Tamar Novas, Fernando Morán, Carlos Blanco	Syldavia Cinema	
O C T O B E R	16	The King of Havana (El rey de La Habana)	Director: Agustí Villaronga Cast: Maykol David Tortolo, Yordanka Ariosa, Héctor Medina	Filmax	
O C T O B E R	16	Wednesdays Don't Exist (Los miércoles no existen)	Director: Peris Romano Cast: Eduardo Noriega, Inma Cuesta, Alexandra Jiménez, William Miller, Gorka Otxoa, Andrea Duro, María León	eOne Films	
O C T O B E R	23	My Big Night (Mi gran noche)	Director: Álex de la Iglesia Cast: Raphael, Mario Casas, Pepón Nieto, Blanca Suárez, Santiago Segura, Carlos Areces, Jaime Ordóñez, Terele Pávez, Carolina Bang, Enrique Villén, Luis Callejo, Ana Polvorosa, Tomás Pozzi, Luis Fernández, Antonio Velázquez, Carmen Ruiz, Marta Castellote, Marta Guerras, Carmen Machi, Hugo Silva	Universal Pictures	
O C T O B E R	30	Truman	Director: Cesc Gay Cast: Ricardo Darín, Javier Cámara	Filmax	(Note: Co-production Spain–Argentina (80%–20%). Released in Argentina on 24 September.)
O C T O B E R	30	The Corpse of Anna Fritz (El cadáver de Anna Fritz)	Director: Hèctor Hernández Vicens Cast: Bernat Saumell, Alba Ribas, Cristian Valencia, Albert Carbó	Splendor Films	
N O V E M B E R	6	Isla bonita	Director: Fernando Colomo Cast: Olivia Delcán, Fernando Colomo	Surtsey Films	
N O V E M B E R	13	An Autumn Without Berlin (Un otoño sin Berlín)	Director: Lara Izagirre Cast: Irene Escolar, Tamar Novas, Ramón Barea	A Contracorriente Films	
N O V E M B E R	13	The Clan (El clan)	Director: Pablo Trapero Cast: Guillermo Francella, Peter Lanzani	Warner Bros. Pictures	
N O V E M B E R	13	Yoko & His Friends (Yoko eta lagunak)	Director: Juanjo Elordi, Rishat Gilmetdinov	Barton Films	(Note: Co-production Spain–Russia (50%–50%).)
N O V E M B E R	20	Spanish Affair 2 (Ocho apellidos catalanes)	Director: Emilio Martínez-Lázaro Cast: Dani Rovira, Karra Elejalde, Carmen Machi, Clara Lago, Rosa Maria Sardá, Berto Romero, Belén Cuesta, Alfonso Sánchez, Alberto López	Universal Pictures	
N O V E M B E R	27	Endless Night (Nadie quiere la noche)	Director: Isabel Coixet Cast: Juliette Binoche, Rinko Kikuchi, Gabriel Byrne, Matt Salinger	Filmax	
D E C E M B E R	4	Food and Shelter (Techo y comida)	Director: Juan Miguel del Castillo Cast: Natalia de Molina, Mariana Cordero, Jaime López, Mercedes Hoyos	A Contracorriente Films	
D E C E M B E R	4	Barcelona Christmas Night (Barcelona, nit d'hivern)	Director: Dani de la Orden Cast: Miki Esparbé, Bárbara Santa-Cruz, Àlex Monner, Cristian Valencia, Jordi Pérez, Bernat Saumell, Alberto San Juan, Alexandra Jiménez, Berto Romero, José Corbacho, Montserrat Carulla, Assumpció Balaguer, Clara Segura, Tina Sáinz, Mariano Venancio, Fanny Gautier	Splendor Films	
D E C E M B E R	11	The Bride (La novia)	Director: Paula Ortiz Cast: Inma Cuesta, Álex García, Asier Etxeandia	Alfa Pictures	
D E C E M B E R	25	Palm Trees in the Snow (Palmeras en la nieve)	Director: Fernando González Molina Cast: Mario Casas, Berta Vázquez, Adriana Ugarte, Macarena García, Emilio Gutiérrez Caba, Laia Costa, Celso Bugallo	Warner Bros. Pictures	
D E C E M B E R	31	Stranded (Incidencias)	Director: José Corbacho, Juan Cruz Cast: Lola Dueñas, Carlos Areces, Ernesto Alterio, Toni Acosta, Miki Esparbé, Roberto Álamo, Rubén Ochandiano	Filmax	

== Box office ==
The ten highest-grossing Spanish feature films in 2015, by domestic box office gross revenue, are as follows:

Highest-grossing films of 2015
Rank	Title	Distributor	Admissions	Domestic gross (€)
1	Spanish Affair 2 (Ocho apellidos catalanes)	Universal Pictures	5,069,757	31,486,085.89
2	Capture the Flag (Atrapa la bandera)	Paramount Pictures	1,936,424	10,960,609.63
3	Off Course (Perdiendo el norte)	Warner Bros. Pictures	1,657,171	10,450,257.42
4	Regression (Regresión)	Universal Pictures	1,437,155	8,925,095.76
5	It's Now or Never (Ahora o nunca)	Sony Pictures	1,398,013	8,274,058.79
6	Palm Trees in the Snow (Palmeras en la nieve)	Warner Bros. Pictures	731,386	4,620,648.27
7	Retribution (El desconocido)	Warner Bros. Pictures	484,479	2,976,990.62
8	Truman	Filmax	500,487	2,826,991.05
9	Spy Time (Anacleto: agente secreto)	Warner Bros. Pictures	415,716	2,659,785.05
10	My Big Night (Mi gran noche)	Universal Pictures	476,021	2,451,565.49

== See also ==
- 30th Goya Awards
