= 30th Goya Awards =

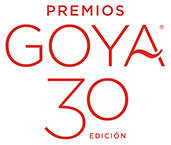
- Date: February 6, 2016
- Site: Madrid Marriott Auditorium Hotel, Madrid
- Hosted by: Dani Rovira
- Organized by: Academy of Cinematographic Arts and Sciences of Spain

Highlights
- Best Film: Truman
- Best Actor: Ricardo Darín; Truman
- Best Actress: Natalia de Molina; Food and Shelter
- Most awards: Truman (5)
- Most nominations: The Bride (12)

Television coverage
- Network: TVE

The 30th Goya Awards were presented at the Madrid Marriott Auditorium Hotel in Madrid on February 6, 2016 to honour the best in Spanish films of 2015. Actor and comedian Dani Rovira was the master of ceremonies for the second time in a row.

Nominations were announced on 14 December 2015 by Asier Etxeandia and Emma Suárez. The Bride received the most nominations with twelve, followed by Endless Night with nine nominations.

Truman won five awards including Best Film and Best Director for Cesc Gay.

== Winners and nominees ==
The winners and nominees are listed as follows:

=== Major awards ===
Best Film: Truman; Nothing in Return; The Bride; Endless Night; A Perfect Day	Best Director: Cesc Gay – Truman; Paula Ortiz – The Bride; Isabel Coixet – Endless Night; Fernando León de Aranoa – A Perfect Day
Best Actor: Ricardo Darín – Truman as Julián; Pedro Casablanc – B as Luis Bárcenas; Luis Tosar – Retribution as Carlos; Asier Etxeandia – The Bride as El novio	Best Actress: Natalia de Molina – Food and Shelter as Rocío; Inma Cuesta – The Bride as la novia; Penélope Cruz – Ma Ma as Magda; Juliette Binoche – Endless Night as Josephine Peary
Best Supporting Actor: Javier Cámara – Truman as Tomás; Felipe García Vélez – Nothing in Return as Justo Caralimpia; Manolo Solo – B as Pablo Ruz; Tim Robbins – A Perfect Day as B	Best Supporting Actress: Luisa Gavasa – The Bride as madre; Elvira Mínguez – Retribution as Belén; Marian Álvarez – Felices 140 as Cati; Nora Navas – Felices 140 as Martina
Best New Actor: Miguel Herrán – Nothing in Return as Darío; Fernando Colomo – Isla bonita as Fernando; Manuel Burque – Requirements to Be a Normal Person as Borja; Álex Garcia – The Bride as Leonardo	Best New Actress: Irene Escolar – An Autumn Without Berlin as June; Antonia Guzmán – Nothing in Return as Antonia; Iraia Elias – Amama as Amaia; Yorkanda Ariosa – The King of Havana as Magda
Best Original Screenplay: Cesc Gay, Tomàs Aragay – Truman; Daniel Guzmán – Nothing in Return; Alberto Marini – Retribution; Borja Cobeaga – Negotiator	Best Adapted Screenplay: Fernando León de Aranoa – A Perfect Day; David Ilundain – B; Agustí Villaronga – The King of Havana; Paula Ortiz, Javier García Arredondo – The Bride
Best Ibero-American Film: The Clan · Argentina; La once · Chile; Magallanes · Peru; Vestido de novia · Cuba	Best European Film: Mustang · France/Turkey/Germany; Sur le chemin de l'école · France; Leviathan · Russia; Macbeth · United Kingdom/France/United States
Best New Director: Daniel Guzmán – Nothing in Return; Dani de la Torre – Retribution; Leticia Dolera – Requirements to Be a Normal Person; Juan Miguel del Castillo – Food and Shelter	Best Animated Film: Capture the Flag; Meñique y el espejo mágico; Holy Night! Noche ¿de paz?; Yoko and His Friends
Best Cinematography: Miguel Ángel Amoedo – The Bride; Josep Maria Civit – The King of Havana –; Jean Claude Larrieu – Endless Night –; Alex Catalán – A Perfect Day	Best Editing: Jorge Coira – Retribution; David Gallart – Requirements to Be a Normal Person; Pablo Barbieri – Truman; Nacho Ruiz Capillas – A Perfect Day
Best Art Direction: Antón Laguna – Palm Trees in the Snow; Jesús Bosqued Maté, Pilar Quintana – The Bride; Arturo García "Biaffra", José Luis Arrizabalaga "Arri" – My Big Night; Alain Bainée – Endless Night	Best Production Supervision: Andrés Santana, Marta Miró – Endless Night; Carlos Pérez de Albéniz – Retribution; Toni Novella – Palm Trees in the Snow; Luis Fernández Lago – A Perfect Day
Best Sound: David Machado, Jaime Fernández, Nacho Arenas – Retribution; Marc Orts, Oriol Tarragó, Sergio Bürmann – Spy Time; Clemens Grulich, César Molina, Ignacio Arenas – The Bride; David Rodríguez, Nicolás de Poulpiquet, Sergio Bürmann – My Big Night	Best Special Effects: Lluís Castells, Lluís Rivera – Spy Time; Isidro Jiménez, Pau Costa – Retribution; Curro Muñoz, Juan R. Molina – My Big Night; Curro Muñoz, Reyes Abades – Breathless Time
Best Costume Design: Clara Bilbao – Endless Night; Paola Torres – My Big Night; Loles García Galeán – Palm Trees in the Snow; Fernando García – A Perfect Day	Best Makeup and Hairstyles: Pablo Perona, Paco Rodríguez H., Sylvie Imbert – Endless Night; Esther Guillem, Pilar Guillem – The Bride; Ana Lozano, Fito Dellibarda, Massimo Gattabrusi – Ma Ma; Alicia López, Karmele Soler, Manolo García, Pedro de Diego – Palm Trees in the Snow
Best Original Score: Lucas Vidal – Endless Night; Santi Vega – El teatro del más allá. Chavín de Huántar; Shigeru Umebayashi – The Bride; Alberto Iglesias – Ma Ma	Best Original Song: "Palmeras en la nieve" by Lucas Vidal and Pablo Alborán – Palm Trees in the Snow; *"So Far and Yet So Close" by Antonio Meliveo – El país del miedo; "Cómo me mata el tiempo" by Luis Ivars – Killing Time; "Techo y comida" by Daniel Quiñones Perulero and Miguel Carabante Manzano – Food and Shelter
Best Fictional Short Film: El corredor; Cordelias; El Trueno Rojo; Inside the Box; Os meninos do rio	Best Animated Short Film: Alike; Honorio. Dos minutos de sol; La noche del océano; Víctimas de Guernica
Best Documentary Film: Sueños de sal; Chicas nuevas 24 horas; I Am Your Father; The Propaganda Game	Best Documentary Short Film: Hijos de la Tierra; Regreso a la Alcarria; Ventanas; Viento de atunes

=== Honorary Goya ===
- Mariano Ozores

== Films with multiple nominations and awards ==
The following films received multiple nominations:

Nominations	Film
12	The Bride
9	Endless Night
8	A Perfect Day
8	Retribution
6	Nothing in Return
6	Truman
5	Palm Trees in the Snow
4	My Big Night
3	Requirements to Be a Normal Person
3	The King of Havana
3	Food and Shelter
3	B
3	Ma Ma
2	Spy Time
2	Felices 140

The following films received multiple awards:

Awards	Film
5	Truman
4	Endless Night
2	The Bride
2	Retribution
2	Nothing in Return
2	Palm Trees in the Snow

== In Memoriam ==
The segment paid tribute to following seventy artists in the montage:

- Margarita Alexandre — producer, director and actress
- Alicia Altabella — actress
- Nadala Batista — actress
- Carlos Álvarez-Novoa — actor
- Laura Alejandro — actress
- José Canalejas — actor
- Julio Vallejo — production manager
- Mate Cantero — producer
- Marcelino Carla Jiménez
- Joan Bosch Palau — director and screenwriter
- Pascual Pérez Porcar — animation director
- Vicente Aranda — director, screenwriter and producer
- Jaime Camino — director
- Matilde Conesa — voice actress
- Antonio Corencia — actor and director
- Vicente Cornejo
- Ramón Centenero — actor
- Curro Summers — actor and screenwriter
- Antonio de Benito — photographer
- Miguel de Grandy — actor and director
- Joaquín de Luna — film critic
- María del Puy — actress
- Juanjo Delgado — photographer
- Marujita Díaz — actress and singer
- José Díaz Espada — producer
- María Espinosa — actress
- Manuel Esteban Marquilles — airector and producer
- José García Galisteo — photographer
- Arrate Garmendia — make-up artist
- Francisco Gisbert — producer
- Gilles Leclair — production manager
- May Heatherly — actress
- Antonio Larreta — narrator, translator and dramatist
- Ismael González Díaz — writer and producer
- Ana Diosdado — actress and writer
- Pepita Llunell — actress
- Katia Loritz — actress
- José Luis Lozano — director, screenwriter and producer
- Aitor Mazo — actor, director and screenwriter
- José Miguel Mendiola Fernández — controller
- Alberto Molina
- Natalia Molero — writer
- Tere Montoya
- Carmen Morell — actress and singer
- Pedro Reyes — actor
- Luis Prendes — distributor
- Gonzalo Quesada — producer
- Nino Renovales — actor
- Ricardo Palacios — actor and director
- Bartolomé Pedrera Alcina
- Angels Poch — actress
- Macarena Pombo — casting director
- Rosa Novell — actress
- Joan Potau — director and screenwriter
- Héctor Colomé — actor
- María Romero — voice actress
- Ana María Romero-Marchent — editor
- José Rosero — music producer
- Marco Rossi — composer
- José Sazatornil — actor
- Manuel Ruiz-Castillo — screenwriter
- Ignacio Salas — actor and writer
- Julio Sanchidrián — voice actor
- Íñigo Santander
- Germán Solano Giménez
- Pío Caro Baroja — screenwriter, writer and documentalist
- Florentino Soria Heredia — screenwriter, producer and director
- Alfonso Valiño — voice actor
- Manel Vicaría — executive producer
- Lina Morgan — actress
