= David di Donatello for Best European Film =

Former annual Italian film award

The David di Donatello for Best European Film (Italian: David di Donatello per il miglior film dell'Unione europea) is a category in the David di Donatello Awards, described as "Italy’s answer to the Oscars". It was awarded by the Accademia del Cinema Italiano (ACI, Academy of Italian Cinema) to recognize the most outstanding non-Italian film released in Europe during the year preceding the ceremony. The award was launched at the 2004 ceremony and cancelled after the 2018 event, following which it was incorporated into the Best Foreign Film award.

== Winners and nominees ==
Winners are indicated in bold.

=== 2000s ===
2004

- **Dogville**, directed by Lars von Trier (ex aequo)
- **Rosenstraße**, directed by Margarethe von Trotta
  - Girl with a Pearl Earring, directed by Peter Webber
  - Good Bye Lenin!, directed by Wolfgang Becker
  - Mondays in the Sun, directed by Fernando León de Aranoa

2005

- **The Sea Inside**, directed by Alejandro Amenábar
  - The Chorus, directed by Christophe Barratier
  - Head-On, directed by Fatih Akin
  - The Merchant of Venice, directed by Michael Radford
  - Vera Drake, directed by Mike Leigh

2006

- **Match Point**, directed by Woody Allen
  - Caché, directed by Michael Haneke
  - L'Enfant, directed by Jean-Pierre Dardenne and Luc Dardenne
  - March of the Penguins, directed by Luc Jacquet
  - Mrs Henderson Presents, directed by Stephen Frears

2007

- **The Lives of Others**, directed by Florian Henckel von Donnersmarck
  - My Best Friend, directed by Patrice Leconte
  - Notes on a Scandal, directed by Richard Eyre
  - The Queen, directed by Stephen Frears
  - Volver, directed by Pedro Almodóvar

2008

- **Irina Palm**, directed by Sam Garbarski
  - 4 Months, 3 Weeks and 2 Days, directed by Cristian Mungiu
  - The Diving Bell and the Butterfly, directed by Julian Schnabel
  - Elizabeth: The Golden Age, directed by Shekhar Kapur
  - The Secret of the Grain, directed by Abdellatif Kechiche

2009

- **Slumdog Millionaire**, directed by Danny Boyle
  - The Class, directed by Laurent Cantet
  - Lemon Tree, directed by Eran Riklis
  - The Reader, directed by Stephen Daldry
  - Waltz with Bashir, directed by Ari Folman

=== 2010s ===
2010

- **Le Concert**, directed by Radu Mihăileanu
  - A Prophet, directed by Jacques Audiard
  - Soul Kitchen, directed by Fatih Akin
  - Welcome, directed by Philippe Lioret
  - The White Ribbon, directed by Michael Haneke

2011

- **The King's Speech**, directed by Tom Hooper
  - Another Year, directed by Mike Leigh
  - In a Better World, directed by Susanne Bier
  - Of Gods and Men, directed by Xavier Beauvois
  - The Secret in Their Eyes, directed by Juan José Campanella

2012

- **The Intouchables**, directed by Éric Toledano and Olivier Nakache
  - The Artist, directed by Michel Hazanavicius
  - Carnage, directed by Roman Polanski
  - Le Havre, directed by Aki Kaurismäki
  - Melancholia, directed by Lars von Trier

2013

- **Amour**, directed by Michael Haneke
  - Anna Karenina, directed by Joe Wright
  - Quartet, directed by Dustin Hoffman
  - Rust and Bone, directed by Jacques Audiard
  - Skyfall, directed by Sam Mendes

2014

- **Philomena**, directed by Stephen Frears
  - Blue Is the Warmest Colour, directed by Abdellatif Kechiche
  - Ida, directed by Paweł Pawlikowski
  - Still Life, directed by Uberto Pasolini
  - Venus in Fur, directed by Roman Polanski

2015

- **The Theory of Everything**, directed by James Marsh
  - The Broken Circle Breakdown, directed by Felix van Groeningen
  - Locke, directed by Steven Knight
  - Pride, directed by Matthew Warchus
  - Wild Tales, directed by Damián Szifron

2016

- **Son of Saul**, directed by László Nemes
  - 45 Years, directed by Andrew Haigh
  - The Brand New Testament, directed by Jaco Van Dormael
  - The Danish Girl, directed by Tom Hooper
  - A Perfect Day, directed by Fernando León de Aranoa

2017

- **I, Daniel Blake**, directed by Ken Loach
  - Florence Foster Jenkins, directed by Stephen Frears
  - Julieta, directed by Pedro Almodóvar
  - Sing Street, directed by John Carney
  - Truman, directed by Cesc Gay

2018

- **The Square**, directed by Ruben Östlund
  - Borg McEnroe, directed by Janus Metz
  - BPM (Beats Per Minute), directed by Robin Campillo
  - Elle, directed by Paul Verhoeven
  - Loving Vincent, directed by Dorota Kobiela and Hugh Welchman
