= Feroz Award for Best Supporting Actress in a Film =

Annual Spanish film award

Feroz Award for Best Supporting Actress
- Awarded for: Best Supporting Performance by an Actress in a Spanish film
- Country: Spain
- Presented by: Asociación de Informadores Cinematográficos de España
- Currently held by: Clara Segura – The 47 (2025)

The Feroz Award for Best Supporting Actress (Spanish: Premio Feroz a la mejor actriz de reparto) is one of the annual awards given at the Feroz Awards, presented by the Asociación de Informadores Cinematográficos de España.

It was first presented in 2014. Terele Pávez was the first recipient of the award for her role as Maritxu in the drama Witching & Bitching.

== Winners and nominees ==
=== 2010s ===
Year	Recipient	Character	English title	Original title
2014	Terele Pávez	Maritxu	Witching and Bitching	Las brujas de Zugarramundi
2014	Verónica Echegui	Edurne	Family United	La gran familia española
2014	Petra Martínez	Amparo	All the Women	Todas las mujeres
2014	Natalia de Molina	Belén	Living Is Easy with Eyes Closed	Vivir es fácil con los ojos cerrados
2014	Rossy de Palma	Mónica	Three Many Weddings	3 bodas de más
2014	Bárbara Santa-Cruz	Catalina	Three Many Weddings	3 bodas de más
2015	Itziar Aizpuru	Tere	Loreak	
2015	Nerea Barros	Rocío	Marshland	La isla mínima
2015	María León	María	Carmina and Amen	Carmina y amén
2015	Yolanda Ramos	Yoli	Carmina and Amen	Carmina y amén
2015	Carmen Machi	Merche / Anne	Spanish Affair	Ocho apellidos vascos
2016	Luisa Gavasa	Mother	The Bride	La novia
2016	Marian Álvarez	Cati	Felices 140	
2016	Dolores Fonzi	Paula	Truman	
2016	Elvira Mínguez	Belén	Retribution	El desconocido
2016	Blanca Suárez	Paloma	My Big Night	Mi gran noche
2017	Ruth Díaz	Ana	The Fury of a Patient Man	Tarde para la ira
2017	Marta Etura	Nieves Fernández Puerto	Smoke & Mirrors	El hombre de las mil caras
2017	Rossy de Palma	Marian	Julieta	
2017	Terele Pávez	Antonia	The Open Door	La puerta abierta
2017	Candela Peña	Candela	Kiki, Love to Love	Kiki, el amor se hace
2018	Adelfa Calvo	Portera	The Motive	El autor
2018	Anna Castillo	Susana Romero	Holy Camp!	La llamada
2018	Belén Cuesta	Sister Milagros	Holy Camp!	La llamada
2018	Gracia Olayo	Mother Bernarda de los Arcos	Holy Camp!	La llamada
2018	Lola Dueñas	Blanca	Can't Say Goodbye	No sé decir adiós
2019	Anna Castillo	Leonor	Journey to a Mother's Room	Viaje al cuarto de una madre
2019	Bárbara Lennie	Bea	Everybody Knows	Todos lo saben
2019	Natalia de Molina	Marta	Quién te cantará	
2019	Marisa Paredes	Marisa	Petra	
2019	Ana Wagener	La Ceballos	The Realm	El reino

=== 2020s ===
Year	Recipient	Character	English title	Original title
2020	Julieta Serrano	Jacinta	Pain and Glory	Dolor y gloria
2020	Mona Martínez	María	Bye	Adiós
2020	Penélope Cruz	Jacinta	Pain and Glory	Dolor y gloria
2020	Laia Marull	Soledad	The Innocence	La inocencia
2020	Antonia San Juan	Imoguiri	The Platform	El hoyo
2021	Verónica Echegui	Amparo	My Heart Goes Boom!	Explota Explota
2021	Juana Acosta	Sara	One Careful Owner	El invonveniente
2021	Natalia de Molina	Adela	Schoolgirls	Las niñas
2021	Nathalie Poza	Violeta	Rosa's Wedding	La boda de Rosa
2021	Paula Usero	Lidia	Rosa's Wedding	La boda de Rosa
2022	Aitana Sánchez-Gijón	Teresa Ferreras	Parallel Mothers	Madres paralelas
2022	Almudena Amor	Liliana	The Good Boss	El buen patrón
2022	Anna Castillo	Verónica	That Was Life	La vida era eso
2022	Milena Smit	Ana Manso Ferreras	Parallel Mothers	Madres paralelas
2022	Carolina Yuste	Desi	Girlfriends	Chavalas
2023	Susi Sánchez	Begoña	Lullaby	Cinco lobitos
2023	Adelfa Calvo	Teodora	On the Fringe	En los márgenes
2023	Ángela Cervantes	Penélope	Motherhood	La Maternal
2023	Carmen Machi	Asun	Piggy	Cerdita
2023	Emma Suárez	Isabel	The Rite of Spring	La consagración de la primavera
2024	Patricia López Arnaiz	Ane	20,000 Species of Bees	20.000 especies de abejas
2024	Ane Gabarain	Lourdes	20,000 Species of Bees	20.000 especies de abejas
2024	Luisa Gavasa	Charo	The Teacher Who Promised the Sea	El maestro que prometió el mar
2024	Aitana Sánchez-Gijón	Roberta	Something Is About to Happen	Que nadie duerma
2024	Ana Torrent	Ana Arenas	Close Your Eyes	Cerrar los ojos
2025	Clara Segura	Carmen	The 47	El 47
2025	Anna Castillo	Abril	Escape	
2025	Marina Guerola	Madalen	Glimmers	Los destellos
2025	Maria Rodríguez Soto	Júlia	A House on Fire	Casa en flames
2025	Aixa Villagrán	Macarena	The Red Virgin	La virgen roja
2026	Nagore Aranburu	Madre Priora Isabel	Sundays	Los domingos
2026	Iraia Elias	Begoña	She Walks in Darkness	Un fantasma en la batalla
2026	Elena Irureta	Elvira	Deaf	Sorda
2026	Maria de Medeiros	Amalia	The Portuguese House	Una quinta portuguesa
2026	Elvira Mínguez	Juana	The Dinner	La cena

== See also ==
- Goya Award for Best Supporting Actress
- Goya Award for Best New Actress
