= The Raven (2012 film) =

2012 film by James McTeigue

- Theatrical release poster
- Directed by: James McTeigue
- Written by: Ben Livingston; Hannah Shakespeare
- Produced by: Marc D Evans; Trevor Macy; Aaron Ryder
- Starring: John Cusack; Luke Evans; Alice Eve; Brendan Gleeson
- Cinematography: Danny Ruhlmann
- Edited by: Niven Howie
- Music by: Lucas Vidal
- Production companies: FilmNation Entertainment; Intrepid Pictures; Galavis Films; Pioneer Pictures; Amontillado Productions; Endgame Entertainment; Poe Producciones
- Distributed by: Relativity Media
- Release dates: March 9, 2012 (United Kingdom); April 27, 2012 (United States)
- Running time: 111 minutes
- Countries: United States; Serbia
- Language: English
- Budget: $26 million
- Box office: $29.7 million

The Raven is a 2012 American crime thriller film directed by James McTeigue, produced by Marc D. Evans, Trevor Macy and Aaron Ryder and written by Ben Livingston and Hannah Shakespeare. Set in 1849, it is a fictionalized account detailing the last days of Edgar Allan Poe's life, in which the poet and author helps the police pursue a serial killer, whose murders mirror those in his stories. While the plot of the film is fictional, the writers based it on some accounts of real situations surrounding Edgar Allan Poe's mysterious death. Poe is said to have repeatedly called out the name "Reynolds" on the night before his death, though it is unclear to whom he was referring. The film stars John Cusack, Alice Eve, Brendan Gleeson and Luke Evans. Its title derives from Poe's 1845 poem "The Raven", in a similar manner to the earlier unrelated 1935 and 1963 films.

The Raven was released in the United Kingdom on March 9, 2012, and in the United States on April 27, 2012, by Relativity Media. The film received mixed reviews from critics, who praised the visual effects and score by Lucas Vidal, but criticized the performances and plot twists.

== Plot ==
In 19th-century Baltimore, Maryland, several policemen discover a murdered woman sprawled on the floor of her apartment, which was locked from the inside. While police search for the killer's means of escape, they discover a second corpse in the chimney, later identified as the 12-year-old daughter of the first victim. A celebrated detective, Emmett Fields, is called to assist in the investigation and discovers that the crime resembles a fictional murder in a short story, "The Murders in the Rue Morgue", that he once read.

The writer Edgar Allan Poe is brought to Fields for questioning. After finding the body of Griswold, a rival of Poe, cut in half by a pendulum (as in Poe's story "The Pit and the Pendulum"), the pair deduce that someone is staging murders based on Poe's stories. Edgar's love, Emily Hamilton, is kidnapped at her father's masquerade ball, like the one described in Poe's "The Masque of the Red Death". The killer taunts Poe in a note, demanding that Edgar write and publish a new story. Poe's lodgings are burned down by people who believe he is exploiting the murders for his own journalistic ends, and he is forced to move in with Fields.

A clue from the killer referring to "The Cask of Amontillado" leads Poe and Fields to search the tunnels under the city with several policemen, discovering the walled-up corpse of a man dressed as Emily. They determine that the man is a sailor, and the clues on his body bring the pursuers to Holy Cross Church, where an empty grave with Emily's name on it has been prepared. As the police attempt to break down the church doors, the killer attacks and kills one of the policemen, then shoots and wounds Fields. Poe gives chase on horseback, but the killer escapes.

Poe writes one last newspaper column, offering his life for Emily's, suggesting that he could take poison. In the morning, the maid gives Poe a letter from the killer, accepting his terms, but the note was delivered long before the paper was distributed. Realizing that the killer must work at the paper, Poe races to confront his editor, Henry, but Henry is already dead, another note lying next to him that reads "getting warmer".

The real killer is the paper's typesetter, Ivan Reynolds, who congratulates Poe and offers him a drink. Ivan attempts to converse with Edgar, but Poe demands Emily's location. Ivan pours a vial of poison, promising to end the story as Poe had written it. Poe agrees and drinks the liquid. Ivan quotes "The Tell-Tale Heart", cluing Edgar that Emily is concealed beneath the printing floor. As the killer leaves, Poe uses the last of his strength to tear up a false section of floor and open a trapdoor leading to Emily's prison.

Poe rescues Emily, and they share a poignant moment before she is taken away by ambulance. Delirious from the poison, Edgar wanders off to a park bench to die. A man walking in the park recognizes him as the famous writer, and asks if he is all right. Poe can summon only enough strength to say, "Tell Fields his last name is Reynolds." Later, when Fields comes to view Poe's corpse at the hospital, the attending physician is unable to tell him the exact cause of death, but mentions that the writer was incoherent, insisting that "his last name is Reynolds." Fields ponders the meaning of the phrase, slowly connecting the dots. The Hamiltons attend Poe's burial.

Ivan disembarks from a train in Paris. As a porter carries his luggage, Ivan climbs into a carriage and is confronted by Fields. He lunges for the detective, and Fields shoots him at point-blank range.

== Cast ==
- John Cusack as Edgar Allan Poe
- Luke Evans as Inspector Emmett Fields
- Alice Eve as Emily Hamilton
- Brendan Gleeson as Captain Charles Hamilton
- Oliver Jackson-Cohen as PC John Cantrell
- Jimmy Yuill as Captain Eldridge
- Kevin McNally as Henry Maddux
- Sam Hazeldine as Ivan Reynolds
- Pam Ferris as Mrs. Bradley
- John Warnaby as Ludwig Griswold (a reference to Rufus Wilmot Griswold who used the pen name Ludwig)
- Brendan Coyle as Reagan

== Production ==
Jeremy Renner was originally going to star in the film (playing the role later taken by Luke Evans), but he dropped out so that he could star in Mission: Impossible – Ghost Protocol. Ewan McGregor was also in talks for a role, but he also dropped out. Joaquin Phoenix was also approached to star at one point. On August 28, 2010, it was confirmed that John Cusack would play Edgar Allan Poe in the film.

The filming began on November 9, 2010 in Belgrade, Novi Sad, and Budapest. The first images from the set were revealed on November 15, 2010. A trailer for the film was released online October 7, 2011. This date is significant because it also marks the anniversary of Poe's death at age 40 in 1849. In 2011 Relativity acquired U.S. rights for only $4 million.

== Reception ==
=== Critical response ===
On Rotten Tomatoes, the film holds a rating of 21% based on 142 reviews, with an average rating of 4.6/10. The site's critics consensus states: "Thinly scripted, unevenly acted, and overall preposterous, The Raven disgraces the legacy of Edgar Allen [sic] Poe with a rote murder mystery that's more silly than scary." On Metacritic, the film has a weighted average score of 44 out of 100, based on 30 critics, indicating "mixed or average reviews". Audiences polled by CinemaScore gave the film an average grade of "B" on an A+ to F scale.

Roger Ebert awarded the film 2 out of 4 stars. James Berardinelli gave the film two and a half stars out of four, writing: "The Raven looks great and is well-paced, but a lack of a compelling resolution makes it an anemic effort." Mick LaSalle of the San Francisco Chronicle wrote, "The story has its moments, and yet there is something about this tale ... that doesn't completely satisfy." Richard Roeper, however, was more positive towards the film, awarding it a B+.

=== Box office ===
The Raven grossed $16 million in the United States and Canada, and $13.7 million in other territories, for a worldwide total of $29.7 million.

The film was projected to gross $8–10 million in its opening weekend, with comparisons to the similarly-themed Jack the Ripper film From Hell, which opened to $11 million in October 2001. It ended up debuting to $7.3 million, finishing seventh at the box office. The audience skewed male (52%) and older (59% over 25 years old). It fell 64% to $2.6 million in its second weekend.

== See also ==
- Edgar Allan Poe bibliography
- Edgar Allan Poe in popular culture
- The Pale Blue Eye
