= Paula del Río =

Spanish actress (born 2000)

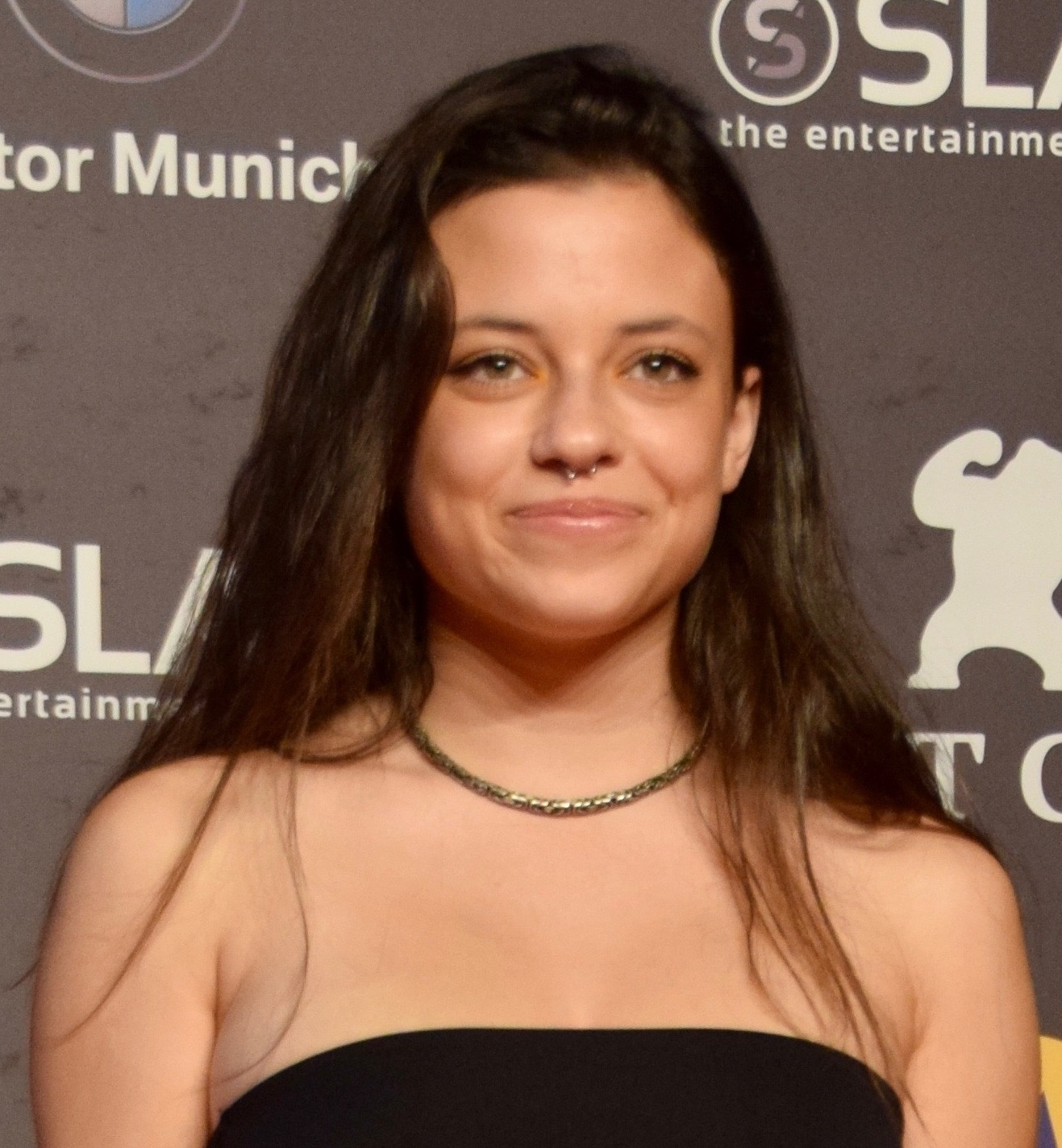
- Paula del Río in 2018
- Born: Paula del Río Segura; 28 February 2000 (age 25); Barcelona, Spain
- Occupation: Actress
- Years active: 2010–present

Paula del Río Segura (born February 28, 2000, in Barcelona) is a Spanish film and television actress who has appeared in films such as El desconocido (2015), La sombra de la ley (2018) and Cuerdas (2019). In addition, she has been one of the protagonists of El internado: Las Cumbres (2021-2022), a reboot series of El internado, on Amazon Prime Video, with the role of Paz.

== Biography ==
Del Río is the cousin of the actress Andrea del Río. She was born in Barcelona in 2000 and had her first performance at only 10 years old in the short film Levedad. In the following years, she continued participating in some short films until, in 2015, she made the leap to cinema with the film El desconocido, directed by Dani de la Torre, alongside Luis Tosar and Elvira Mínguez.

In 2018, she participated again in another feature film by Dani de la Torre, La sombra de la ley, playing Elisa. In 2019, she starred in the feature film Cuerdas by José Luis Montesinos, playing the role of Elena, a paralyzed girl who is locked in her father's house with a dog that contracts rabies.

On television, she has participated in Centro médico, Servir y proteger, Hospital Valle Norte and Bany Compartit, where she played one of the main characters. In 2021, she joined the main cast of the reboot series of El internado, El internado: Las Cumbres, where she plays Paz.

== Filmography ==
=== Cinema ===
| Year | Title | Role | Directed by |
|---|---|---|---|
| 2015 | El desconocido | Sara | Dani de la Torre |
| 2018 | La sombra de la ley | Elisa | Dani de la Torre |
| 2019 | Cuerdas | Elena | José Luis Montesinos |

=== Television ===
| Year | Títle | Role | Channel | Duration |
|---|---|---|---|---|
| 2017 | Centro médico | Alicia | TVE | 1 episode |
| 2018 | Servir y proteger | Lidia Velasco | TVE | Supporting cast; 3 episodes |
| 2019 | Hospital Valle Norte | Irene | TVE | Supporting cast; 2 episodes |
| 2019 | Bany Compartit | Greta Puig | TVE Cataluña | Main cast; 39 episodes |
| 2021-2022 | El internado: Las Cumbres | Paz Espinosa | Amazon Prime Video | Main cast; 16 episodes |

== Awards and nominations ==
| Year | Award | Category | Nominated work | Result | Ref. |
|---|---|---|---|---|---|
| 2015 | Medallas del Círculo de Escritores Cinematográficos | Best new actress | El desconocido | Nominated | |
| 2015 | Premios Mestre Mateo | Best Leading Actress | El desconocido | Won | |
| 2020 | Festival de cine fantástico Grimmfest | Best Leading Actress | Cuerdas | Won | |
