= B, la película =

- Theatrical release poster
- Directed by: David Ilundain
- Screenplay by: David Ilundain
- Based on: Ruz-Bárcenas by Jordi Casanovas
- Starring: Pedro Casablanc; Manolo Solo
- Cinematography: Ángel Amorós
- Edited by: Marta Velasco
- Production companies: Inicia Films; Bolo Audiovisual
- Distributed by: Avalon (es)
- Release date: 18 September 2015
- Running time: 78 min
- Country: Spain
- Language: Spanish

B, la película (English: "B, the film") is a 2015 Spanish legal drama film directed by David Ilundain.

The screenplay is based on the stage work Ruz-Bárcenas by Jordi Casanovas, a transcription of testimony given 15 July 2013 by Luis Bárcenas, former treasurer of the Partido Popular, to Pablo Ruz, one of the judges of Spain's central criminal court, the Audiencia Nacional. Bárcenas was facing charges of corruption, and the title of the film refers to the Spanish term Caja B, meaning parallel accounting or slush fund. The main characters are interpreted in the film by Pedro Casablanc and Manolo Solo. It is a courtroom drama based on actual events, even though its screenplay is so faithful to reality, that it could be considered more as a documentary source rather than fiction.

== Reception ==
The film was not widely distributed, but received recognition from the critics. At the Goya Awards (Spain's principal national film awards) the screenplay was nominated in the Best Adaptation category and there were nominations for two of the actors, Pedro Casablanc (Best Actor) and Manolo Solo (Best Supporting Actor).

== Cast ==
- Pedro Casablanc - Luis Bárcenas
- Manolo Solo - Judge Ruz
- Pedro Civera - Javier Gómez de Liaño
- Eduardo Recabarren - Gonzalo Boyen
- Patxi Freytez - Enrique Santiago
- Celia Castro - María Dolores Márquez de Prado
- Enric Benavent - José Mariano Benítez de Lugo
- Ramón Ibarra - Miguel Durán
