= Natalia de Molina =

Spanish actress

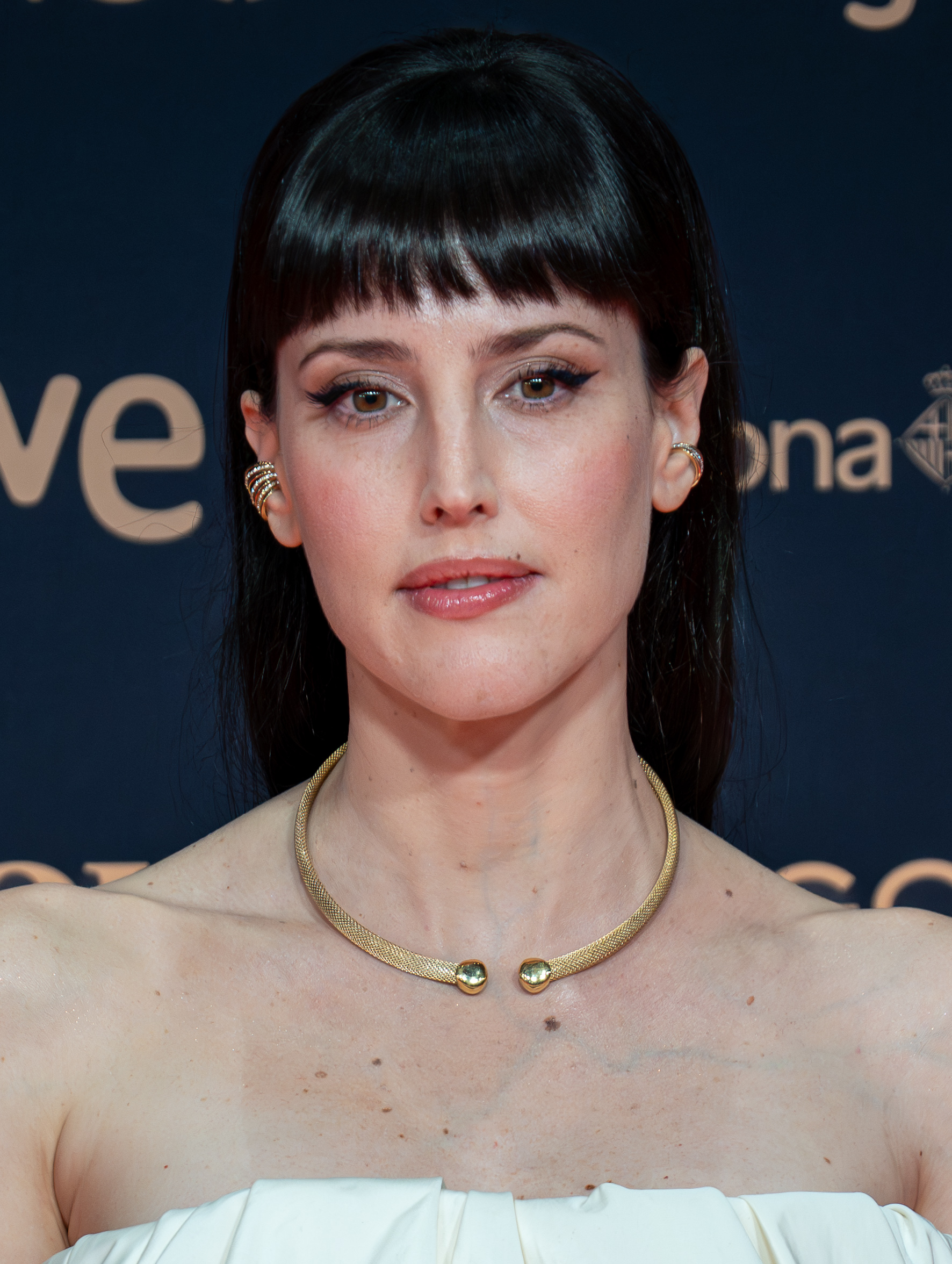
- De Molina in 2026
- Born: Natalia de Molina Díaz; 19 December 1990 (age 35); Linares, Andalusia, Spain
- Occupation: Actress
- Relatives: Celia de Molina (sister)

Natalia de Molina Díaz (born 19 December 1990) is a Spanish actress from Andalusia. Since her film debut in the 2013 comedy-drama Living Is Easy with Eyes Closed, she has featured in films such as Food and Shelter (for which she won the Goya Award for Best Actress), Quién te cantará, Bye, Schoolgirls and Undercover Wedding Crashers.

== Early life and education ==
Natalia de Molina Díaz was born on 19 December 1990 in Linares, in the province of Jaén, although she was raised in Granada since age 2 with her mother and her three elder sisters. Her uncle is an actor and theatre director and her elder sister Celia is also an actress. She studied at the IES Cervantes in the Bola de Oro neighborhood and the Granada's Art School, where she took the Spanish Baccalaureate with specialisation in arts. She moved to Málaga when she was 18 years old to study performing arts (musical specialisation) at the local Escuela Superior de Arte Dramático, later moving to Madrid before finishing her degree.

== Career ==
De Molina made her feature film debut in David Trueba's 2013 comedy-drama Living Is Easy with Eyes Closed, portraying Belén, an unmarried pregnant woman in Francoist Spain. Her breakout performance earned her the Goya Award for Best New Actress. She was recognised among the recipients of the 2015 Shooting Stars Award presented by European Film Promotion at the 65th Berlinale. In 2016, she won the Goya Award for Best Actress for her role as unemployed single mother in Food and Shelter, thereby becoming the youngest actress to win two Goya awards.

In 2018, she was invited to membership in the Academy of Motion Picture Arts and Sciences.

== Filmography ==
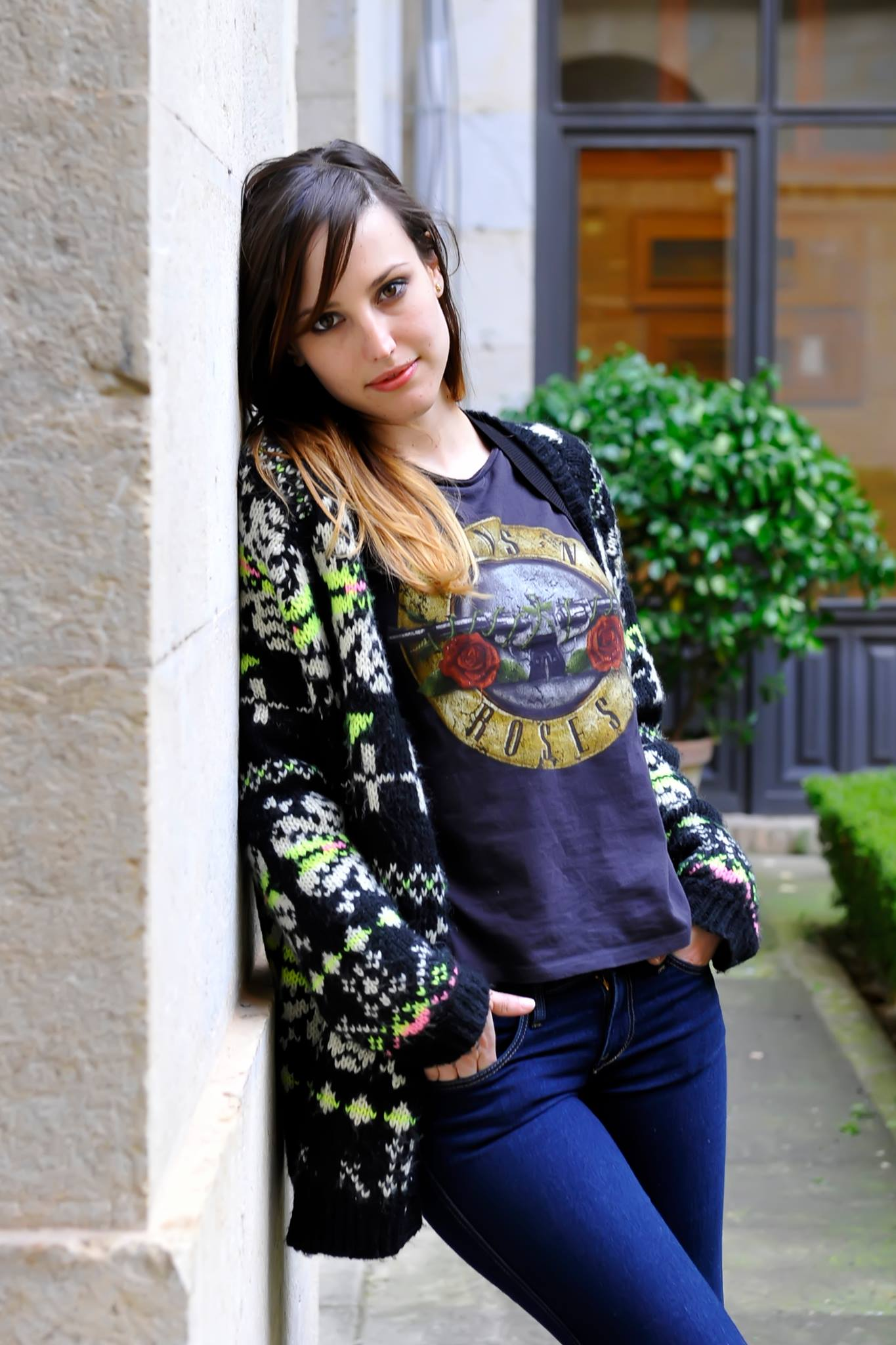
De Molina in 2014

=== Film ===
Year	Title	Original title	Role	Notes	Ref.
2013	Living Is Easy with Eyes Closed	Vivir es fácil con los ojos cerrados	Belén		
2013	Temporal	Temporal	Sara		
2015	Girl's Night Out	Cómo sobrevivir a una despedida	Nora		
2015	Food and Shelter	Techo y comida	Rocío		
2015	Just a Little Chemistry	Sólo química	Melanie		
2015	Pozoamargo	Pozoamargo	Gloria		
2016	Kiki, Love to Love	Kiki, el amor se hace	Natalia		
2016	The Tunnel Gang	Los del túnel	Miriam		
2018	You Shall Not Sleep	No dormirás	Cecilia		
2018	Quién te cantará	Quién te cantará	Marta		
2018	Unbridled	Animales sin collar	Nora		
2019	522. A Cat, a Chinese Guy and My Father	522. Un gato, un chino y mi padre	George		
2019	Elisa & Marcela	Elisa y Marcela	Elisa Sánchez Loriga		
2019	Bye	Adiós	Triana		
2020	Schoolgirls	Las niñas	Adela		
2021	Undercover Wedding Crashers	Operación Camarón	Luci		
2022	One Year, One Night	Un año, una noche	Julia		
2022	Unfinished Affairs	La maniobra de la tortuga	Cristina		
2022	Counting Sheep	Contando ovejas	Paola		
2022	Mirror, Mirror	Espejo, Espejo	Paula		
2023	Siege	Asedio	Dani		
2024	May I Speak with the Enemy?	¿Es el enemigo? La película de Gila	Rosa		
2024	Dismantling an Elephant	Desmontando un elefante	Blanca		
2026	La bola negra		Valentina		
TBA		El sastre del rey	Victoria		
TBA		Mestres			

=== Television ===
Key
†	Denotes television productions that have not yet been released

Year	Title	Original title	Role	Notes	Ref.
2013	El Gran Día de los Feos	El Gran Día de los Feos	Sheila		
2015	Bajo sospecha	Bajo sospecha	Leti		
2016	Web Therapy	Web Therapy	María del Mar		
2017	The Light of Hope	La llum d'Elna	Carmen	TV movie	
2017	The End of Comedy	El fin de la comedia	Natalia		
2018	Cathedral of the Sea	La catedral del mar	Francesca		
2019	Foodie Love	Foodie Love	Natalia		
2022	Simple	Fácil	Marga		
2024	Iron Reign	Mano de hierro	Rocío		
2025	Superstar	Superestar	Loly Álvarez		
2026		Marbella	Carmen Leal		

== Accolades ==
Year	Award	Category	Work	Result	Ref.
2014	1st Feroz Awards	Best Film Actress in a Supporting Role	Living Is Easy with Eyes Closed	Nominated	
2014	69th CEC Awards	Best New Actress	Living Is Easy with Eyes Closed	Won	
2014	28th Goya Awards	Best New Actress	Living Is Easy with Eyes Closed	Won	
2016	21st Forqué Awards	Best Actress	Food and Shelter	Won	
2016	3rd Feroz Awards	Best Film Actress	Food and Shelter	Nominated	
2016	8th Gaudí Awards	Best Actress	Food and Shelter	Nominated	
2016	71st CEC Medals	Best Actress	Food and Shelter	Won	
2016	30th Goya Awards	Best Actress	Food and Shelter	Won	
2016	25th Actors and Actresses Union Awards	Best Film Actress in a Leading Role	Food and Shelter	Nominated	
2019	6th Feroz Awards	Best Film Actress in a Supporting Role	Quién te cantará	Nominated	
2019	74th CEC Awards	Best Supporting Actress	Quién te cantará	Nominated	
2019	33rd Goya Awards	Best Supporting Actress	Quién te cantará	Nominated	
2019	28th Actors and Actresses Union Awards	Best Actress in an International Production	You Shall Not Sleep	Nominated	
2020	75th CEC Medals	Best Supporting Actress	Bye	Won	
2020	34th Goya Awards	Best Supporting Actress	Bye	Nominated	
2021	8th Feroz Awards	Best Film Actress in a Supporting Role	Schoolgirls	Nominated	
2021	76th CEC Medals	Best Supporting Actress	Schoolgirls	Nominated	
2021	35th Goya Awards	Best Supporting Actress	Schoolgirls	Nominated	
2021	13th Gaudí Awards	Best Supporting Actress	Schoolgirls	Nominated	
2022	1st Carmen Awards	Best Supporting Actress	Undercover Wedding Crashers	Won	
2022	28th Forqué Awards	Best TV Actress	Simple	Nominated	
2023	2nd Carmen Awards	Best Actress	Unfinished Affairs	Won	
2025	4th Carmen Awards	Best Actress	Dismantling an Elephant	Nominated	
2026	13th Feroz Awards	Best Supporting Actress in a Series	Superstar	Nominated	
