= Pablo Ruz =

Spanish judge (born 1975)

Pablo Rafael Ruz Gutiérrez (born 28 November 1975 in Madrid) is a Spanish judge. He is best known for his part in investigating the Gürtel corruption scandal (previously handled by Baltasar Garzón and Antonio Pedreira) and the related Barcenas affair, but has handled other prominent cases.

He was educated at Comillas Pontifical University. In 2008, he was appointed to Spain's central criminal court, the Audiencia Nacional, on a temporary basis. He was re-appointed in June 2010, filling the vacancy left by Baltasar Garzón. Although the appointment was again on an interim basis, he served there until April 2015, when he was replaced by José de la Mata. Ruz then took up a position in Móstoles.

== Media portrayal ==
Ruz was portrayed by the actor Manolo Solo in the 2015 film B, la película. Solo won the Unión de Actores prize for best supporting actor (mejor actor de reparto de cine) and received a nomination in the same category (interpretación masculina de reparto) in the Goya Awards (Spain's principal national film awards).
