= Ahn Myeong Chul =

North Korean defector (born 1969)

- Born: September 22, 1969; Hongwon County, South Hamgyong Province, North Korea
- Occupation: Prison guard then activist

Korean name
- Hangul: 안명철
- RR: An Myeongcheol
- MR: An Myŏngch'ŏl

Ahn Myeong Chul (Note: Also spelled Ahn Myung-chul and Ahn Myong Chol.) (Korean: 안명철; born February 22, 1969) is a North Korean former prison guard who defected and became a human rights activist. He was born in Hongwon County (Hongwon-gun), South Hamgyong Province.

== Life as a prison guard ==
Ahn said prison guards are taught that prisoners are traitors, enemies, and not even people. He saw and took part in many severe abuses of prisoners. Systemic abuse, including near-starvation, sexual abuse, torture and executions are rampant in the camps. One type of abuse he often saw was eyeball removal. He became numb to the abuses. The camps are disguised so that in a satellite photo they look like ordinary villages.

Unlike most defectors, Ahn was part of the political prisoner penal system, a prison guard. Ahn became a guard at age 19, after completing two years of military service. Ahn defected in 1994 after serving as a prison guard for eight years and serving in four different camps, including Hoeryong. These four camps were all classified total control zones, from which the release of prisoners under any circumstances is prohibited. Three of the camps were closed, but Hoeryong is still open, where he worked from May 1987 to September 1994. The guards had orders to shoot anyone who rebelled or tried to escape and to destroy all evidence of the camp in case of a regime collapse. While he admits to abusing prisoners, he claims he never killed one, though he saw other guards kill prisoners. Ahn now lives in Seoul. About five prisoners would die each day and Ahn often beat prisoners. He defected because his father had criticized the regime while drunk, complaining about food shortages, in front of witnesses. His father committed suicide the next day. In North Korea the families of offendees are often punished along with the offender. Even children born in the camps were often kept there their entire lives and Ahn became concerned for his welfare. He began talking to the prisoners to relieve the monotony of his job and about 90 percent of them did not know why they were there. This made him begin questioning things. One day while on leave from his job, he found his family was missing. His mother, brother, and sister were made prisoners in political camps. His father had been a high-ranking party member who led a privileged life. When Ahn returned to work he was under suspicion.

== Defection and later life ==
Ahn pleaded with his superiors that he was loyal but he was kept under surveillance. Strict loyalty to the party and regime are demanded. He even wrote a letter in his own blood to prove his loyalty to Kim Jong Il and the surveillance eased a bit. One day in September 1994, he took two prisoners with him and drove off in a car to the Tumen River, on the border with China. These two prisoners were brothers who have been in the camps since they were four and two years old and were now in their mid 20s. The two prisoners got scared and left. Ahn does not know what happened to them. He crossed into China. A Korea-born Chinese acquaintance helped him get to Seoul. What shocked him the most when he arrived in South Korea was that people were able to openly denounce and criticize the government and its leaders without retribution. After defecting from North Korea, he has worked with the NGO Free the North Korean Gulag and provided testimony to the United Nations Commission of Inquiry on Human Rights in the Democratic People's Republic of North Korea. Ahn now heads "North Korea Watch". His hope is that the human rights violations in North Korea are brought to the International Criminal Court. Ahn feels the human rights situation in North Korea has gotten worse since Kim Jong Un came to power. Under Kim there is no forgiveness and no second chances. Ahn feels that if human rights significantly improve in North Korea, the regime will collapse. Ahn also feels that the regime would collapse if China stopped supporting the North Korean regime.

In March 2014, Ahn filed a petition to the United Nations special rapporteur on slavery in which he equates the conditions in North Korea “modern day slavery.”

In November 2014, Ahn was part of a group of 20 defectors who urged the Swiss government to freeze the bank accounts of North Korea's leaders, who are known to have large sums in Swiss bank accounts. The Swiss government said this cannot be done with approval by the United Nations Security Council, which would likely be blocked by permanent Security Council members Russia and China.

China often sends defectors back to North Korea. Many female defectors who end up in China become trafficking victims and have children fathered by Chinese men. China often lets the children stay in China but sends the women back to North Korea, essentially making the children orphans. Ahn feels China should stop this practice.
