= Retribution (2015 film) =

- Theatrical release poster
- Spanish: El desconocido
- Directed by: Dani de la Torre
- Written by: Alberto Marini
- Starring: Luis Tosar; Javier Gutiérrez; Elvira Mínguez; Fernando Cayo; Paula del Río; Marco Sanz; Ricardo de Barreiro; Luis Zahera; Antonio Mourelos; María Mera; Goya Toledo
- Cinematography: Josu Inchaustegui
- Edited by: Jorge Coira
- Music by: Manuel Riveiro
- Production companies: Vaca Films; Atresmedia Cine; La Ferme! Productions
- Distributed by: Warner Bros. Pictures
- Release dates: 2 September 2015 (Venice); 25 September 2015 (Spain)
- Running time: 96 minutes
- Countries: Spain; France
- Language: Spanish
- Box office: $3.5 million

Retribution (Spanish: El desconocido, transl. 'The Stranger') is a 2015 Spanish-French action thriller film directed by Dani de la Torre, and starring Luis Tosar, Javier Gutiérrez, Elvira Mínguez and Goya Toledo. It was screened in the Venice Days section of the 72nd Venice International Film Festival.

== Plot ==
Carlos is a bank executive who lives with his wife Marta and children Marcos and Sara. Carlos gets ready to drop Marcos and Sara off to school while Marcos brings a soccer ball with an autograph on it because he wants to prove to his friends that he really does have the autograph. After starting the car, Carlos receives an anonymous call on a phone that has been left inside and is told that a bomb has been placed under each of the car's seats, set to explode if any of them leaves their seated position. The devices will be deactivated only once Carlos transfers a large sum of money into the caller's account.

Carlos stops the car near the school to try to figure this out. Some kids from the school crowd wants to see the ball with the autograph, but Carlos cannot let Marcos get out to show the ball to his classmates and his friends think he was lying. Carlos calls one of his coworkers and they say the mysterious man on the phone (who will be referred to as "the stranger") called them too. Carlos and his coworker meet up and discuss the situation, still in each of their cars, blocking traffic. While Carlos drives away, someone in his coworker's car gets out and the car blows up. Carlos drives past the blown up car in horror and the stranger orders Carlos to drive away quickly. Marcos is injured in the explosion and Carlos wants to drive him to the hospital, but the stranger won't let him until he transfers the money.

Carlos calls Marta and tells her about the situation, telling her to go to the bank to transfer the money in her accounts to the stranger's account. Carlos sits in his car near the bank. Marta shows up at the bank with another person. On the phone, Carlos is stopped by police and is isolated by a bomb squad. He is then told that he must release Marcos and Sarah, but still believes that they are in danger. After negotiation with them, they find out there is only a bomb in the front two seats. Still injured by the explosion in his leg, Marcos is released, but Sara jumps in the front seat as she does not want to abandon Carlos. After some time, Sara and Carlos are visited by a past client named Lucas, but claims to be Carlos's brother Pablo. Lucas tells them that he was the one extorting the money over the phone from Carlos for having his wife commit suicide after being coaxed into making bad investments that ruined her economically.

Lucas leaves and begins telling him over the phone that a separate bomb he showed them before will blow if Carlos doesn't make an escape to a location where more money can be sent to his account in 5 minutes. Sara and Carlos hastily escape in spite of the behest of authorities until they reach a dock where Sara reluctantly accepts to leave for her safety. Lucas returns to Carlos in the passenger seat and explains himself, Carlos then decides to drive the car into the water in order to escape the explosion. After driving into the water and swimming away, Carlos escapes and is resuscitated by paramedics and is later laid off from his bank job. Carlos, on the phone with a new employee in his previous managerial position telling him about a business opportunity, promptly hangs up the phone after the caller states how important family is to a business.

== Cast ==
- Luis Tosar as Carlos
- Javier Gutiérrez as Lucas, the stranger
- Goya Toledo as Marta
- Fernando Cayo as Chief Espinosa
- Elvira Mínguez as Belén
- Paula del Río as Sara
- Marco Sanz as Marcos
- Luis Zahera as Driver
- Ricardo de Barreiro as Víctor
- María Mera as Julia
- Antonio Mourelos as Ángel
- Jason Redshaw as David Park

== Production ==
The film was produced by Vaca Films and Atresmedia Cine alongside La Ferme Productions, with the participation of Atresmedia, Movistar+, TVG, Canal+ (France) and R., and the support of Concello de A Coruña, ICAA and AGADIC. The film was shot in 2014 in A Coruña.

== Release ==
Retribution made its world premiere on 2 September 2015, screened as the opening film of the Venice Festival's parallel section Giornate degli autori. The film was also presented on 22 September 2021 at the San Sebastián International Film Festival. Distributed by Warner Bros., the film was theatrically released in Spain on 25 September 2015.

== Reception ==
Reviewing the film from Venice, Guy Lodge of Variety considered that "pumped up but wholly derivative, Dani de la Torre's bomb-on-wheels thriller makes for an efficient Hollywood calling card".

David Rooney of The Hollywood Reporter, considering that the film was an odd choice for the "auteur-driven" Venice Days, concluded that it was "Locke meets Speed, bypassing originality and plausibility".

Rubén Romero Santos of Cinemanía rated the film with 3½ out of 5 stars, deeming it to be a "qualitative leap" for Spanish thrillers, also considering that "few Spanish films can boast of having the same technical qualities". He however pointed out that the film falters because of its sound.

== Awards and nominations ==
Year	Award	Category	Nominee(s)	Result	Ref.
2016	21st Forqué Awards	Best Actor	Luis Tosar	Nominated	
2016	3rd Feroz Awards	Best Drama Film		Nominated	
2016	3rd Feroz Awards	Best Director	Dani de la Torre	Nominated	
2016	3rd Feroz Awards	Best Main Actor	Luis Tosar	Nominated	
2016	3rd Feroz Awards	Best Supporting Actor	Javier Gutiérrez	Nominated	
2016	3rd Feroz Awards	Best Supporting Actress	Elvira Mínguez	Nominated	
2016	3rd Feroz Awards	Best Trailer		Nominated	
2016	30th Goya Awards	Best Original Screenplay	Alberto Marini	Nominated	
2016	30th Goya Awards	Best Actor	Luis Tosar	Nominated	
2016	30th Goya Awards	Best Supporting Actress	Elvira Mínguez	Nominated	
2016	30th Goya Awards	Best New Director	Dani de la Torre	Nominated	
2016	30th Goya Awards	Best Editing	Jorge Coira	Won	
2016	30th Goya Awards	Best Production Supervision	Carlos Pérez de Albéniz	Nominated	
2016	30th Goya Awards	Best Sound	David Machado, Jaime Fernández and Nacho Arenas	Won	
2016	30th Goya Awards	Best Special Effects	Isidro Jiménez and Pau Costa	Nominated	
2016	25th Actors and Actresses Union Awards	Best Film Actor in a Minor Role	Fernando Cayo	Nominated	
2016	3rd Platino Awards	Best Ibero-American Debut Film		Nominated	

== Remakes ==
As of 2023, Retribution has been remade three times.

In 2018, a German-language adaptation, Don't. Get. Out! (Steig. Nicht. Aus!), directed by Christian Alvart and starring Wotan Wilke Möhring, was released in Germany.

In 2021, a Korean version, Hard Hit (Balsinjehan), starring Jo Woo-jin and directed by Kim Chang-ju, was released.

In 2017, Liam Neeson was announced to star in an English-language film of the same name. Released in August 2023, the remake, directed by Nimród Antal, co-stars Embeth Davidtz, Lilly Aspell, Jack Champion, Noma Dumezweni and Matthew Modine.

== See also ==
- List of Spanish films of 2015
