= The Propaganda Game =

- Movie poster of The Propaganda Game
- Directed by: Álvaro Longoria
- Written by: Álvaro Longoria
- Produced by: Álvaro Longoria
- Cinematography: Diego Dussuel; Rita Noriega
- Edited by: Victoria Lammers; Alex Marquez
- Music by: Fernando Velázquez
- Release date: 19 September 2015 (San Sebastián)
- Running time: 98 minutes
- Countries: Spain; France
- Language: English

The Propaganda Game is a 2015 documentary film about North Korea by director Álvaro Longoria.

It was described by The Hollywood Reporter as an "effectively a well-mounted video diary of his short visit to the country" and "inevitably intriguing because of its subject".

The film had its world premiere at the September 2015 San Sebastián International Film Festival, and was nominated for the award for Best Documentary Film at the 30th Goya Awards.

== Production ==
Longoria was permitted to film high-quality footage within the country, his visit facilitated and monitored by Alejandro Cao de Benós, the Spanish founder of the Korean Friendship Association who himself becomes a subject of the documentary. The film, which includes interviews as well as archival and contemporary news footage, attempts to describe the nation's social realities with particular attention to media manipulation by the DPRK government, while also questioning the simplifications and caricatures about North Korea made by foreign observers.

Longoria shot mainly in Pyongyang, including the Pyongyang Metro, the Munsu Water Park, the Mansudae Grand Monument and a mass in the Changchung Cathedral. There are also scenes in Panmunjom in the Korean Demilitarized Zone.

Longoria told Variety that he had deliberately avoided "the typical moving handheld secret look at North Korea", and that he undertook, in the film's striking opening sequence, "to use 'propaganda' aesthetics" and "to shoot North Korea in a way that hasn’t been shown before: as beautiful as possible", with attention to Pyongyang residents enjoying leisurely activities in their city. "Most people say they’ve never seen North Korea like that, which is surprising as we just shot what we were shown", Longoria said. The filmmaker, who readily admits that he is not an expert in North Korea, "decided to make information manipulation the underlying plot" of his film, and through the use of restrained commentary, to let viewers themselves decide what may or may not have been staged for his visit.

== Cast ==
The people interviewed include:

- Cao de Benós' parents
- Simon Cockerell of Koryo Tours
- Barbara Demick – American journalist
- Rajiv Narayam, Amnesty International researcher
- Alejandro Cao de Benós, Spanish political activist
- Andrei Lankov, Russian expert on North Korea
- Ahn Myeong Chul, North Korean defector
- Xiaohe Cheng, professor of international studies.
- Suzanne Scholte – American activist (born 1959)
- Esteban Beltrán, Spanish section of Amnesty International
- Georgina Higueras, Spanish journalist
- Jaime Florcruz, CNN
- Shin Dong-Hyuk, North Korean defector

== Reception ==
On the review aggregator website Rotten Tomatoes, 93% of 14 critics' reviews are positive, with an average rating of 7/10.

== See also ==
- Defilada, a 1989 Polish documentary about the cult of personality in North Korea
