= Jordi Casanovas =

Spanish playwright

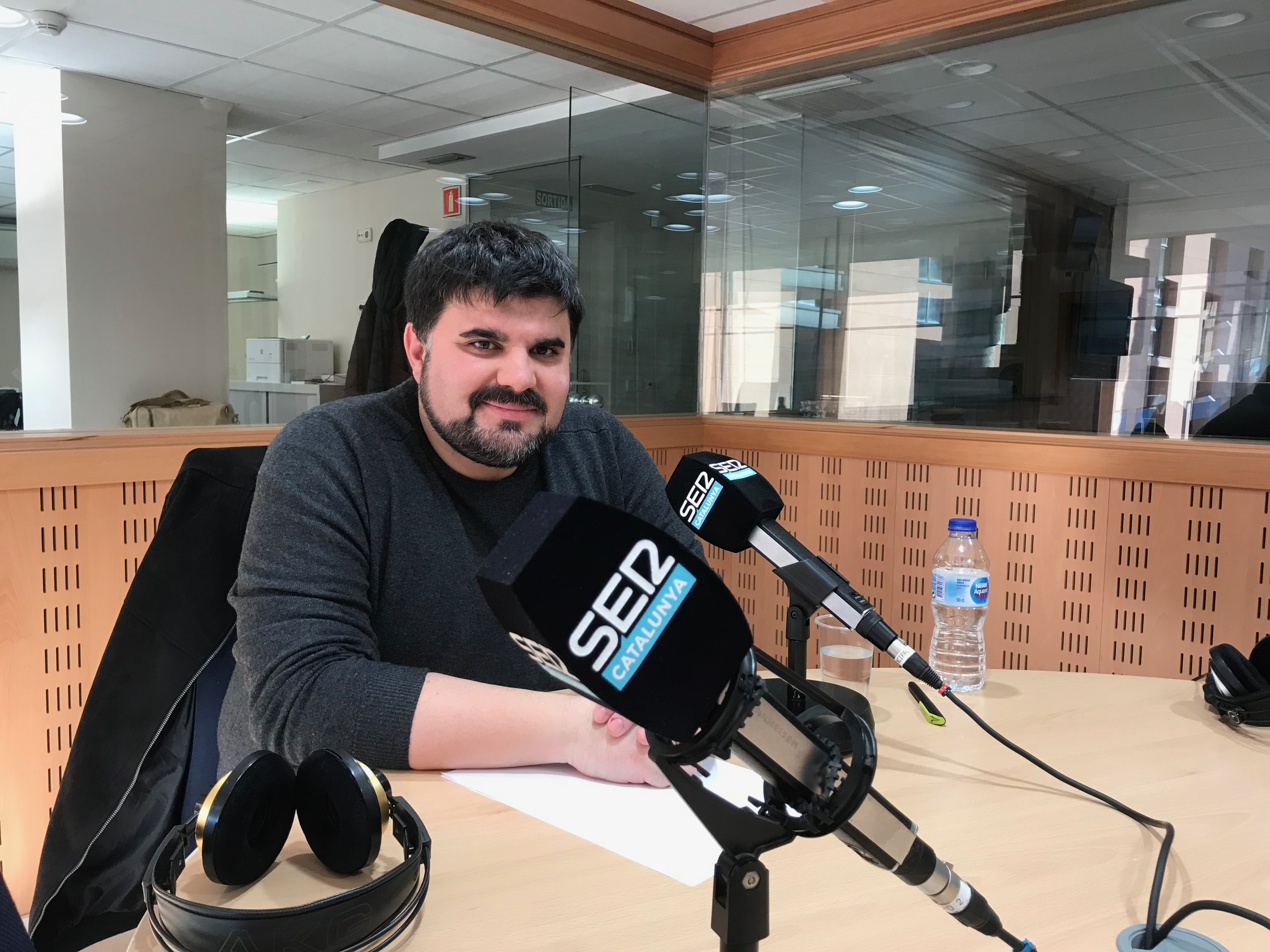
Jordi Casanovas

Jordi Casanovas Güell (Catalan pronunciation: [ˈʒɔɾði ˌkazəˈnɔβəs]; born 1978 in Vilafranca del Penedès) is a Catalan playwright.

== Bibliography ==
=== Plays ===
Les millors occasions. 2002 Gebre. 2003 Estralls. 2003 Andorra. 2004 Neoburning Generation. 2005 Beckenbauer. 2005 Kuina Katalana. 2005 Wolfenstein. 2006 Tetris. 2006 City/Simcity. 2007 Aquesta tampoc serà la fi del món. 2007 La ruïna. 2008[1] Lena Woyzeck. 2008 La revolució. 2009 Julia Smells. 2009 Transició. 2010 Sopar amb batalla. 2010 Un home amb ulleres de pasta. 2010 Una història catalana. 2011 Pàtria. 2012 Köttbulle. 2014 Ruz-Bárcenas. 2014 Idiota. 2014 Vilafranca. 2015 Hey Boy Hey Girl. 2015 Port Arthur. 2015 Cervantes. 2016

==== Awarded plays ====
- Les millors occasions Premi Internacional AIET de Teatre Universitari "Josep Robrenyo", 2002
- Beckenbauer Ciutat d'Alcoi de teatre, 2005
- Andorra Marqués de Bradomín, 2005
- Estralls Premi "Eduard Escalante" Premis Ciutat de València 2006
- Hardocore Videogames, una trilogia (Wolfenstein, Tetris, City/Simcity) Premi de la crítica Serra d'Or al millor text del 2006 i Premi Revelació de la crítica de Barcelona 2007
