= Food and Shelter =

- Spanish: Techo y comida
- Directed by: Juan Miguel del Castillo
- Written by: Juan Miguel del Castillo
- Produced by: German García; Alfred Santapau
- Starring: Natalia de Molina; Mariana Cordero; Mercedes Hoyos; Gaspar Campuzano; Montse Torrent; Natalia Roig; Manuel Tallafé; Jaime López
- Cinematography: Manuel Montero
- Edited by: Juan Miguel del Castillo
- Music by: Daniel Quiñones
- Production company: Diversa Audiovisual
- Release dates: 23 April 2015 (Málaga); 4 December 2015 (Spain)
- Running time: 89 minutes
- Country: Spain
- Language: Spanish

Food and Shelter (Spanish: Techo y comida) is a 2015 Spanish drama directed by Juan Miguel del Castillo in his directorial feature debut. It stars Natalia de Molina, who won a Goya Award for her Leading Performance as an unemployed single mother.

The film reflects the stresses faced by individuals as the impact of the 2008 financial crisis continues to be felt in the Spanish economy.

== Plot ==
Rocío, an unemployed single mother, has barely enough to eat as she does not receive unemployment benefits. Between feelings of shame, failure and the fear of losing custody of her 8-year-old son Adrián, she tries to maintain the appearance of living a normal life with some help from a neighbour. The situation becomes worse when the landlord, himself overwhelmed by debts, sues her for the rent she owes.

== Cast ==
- Natalia de Molina as Rocío
- Jaime López as Adrián
- Mariana Cordero
- Mercedes Hoyos
- Gaspar Campuzano
- Montse Torrent
- Natalia Roig
- Manuel Tallafé

== Production ==
Food and Shelter is the first feature film from Juan Miguel del Castillo, an experienced editor and director of shorts. A Diversa Audiovisual production, the film was largely financed by crowdfunding. It was primarily shot in Jerez, in the province of Cádiz.

== Release ==
The film premiered at the 18th Málaga Film Festival on 23 April 2015. Its festival run also included the Film and Human Rights Festival of Pamplona, the Ourense International Film Festival, and the Tallinn Black Nights Film Festival. Distributed by A Contracorriente Films, it was theatrically released in Spain on 4 December 2015.

== Accolades ==
Year	Award	Category	Nominee(s)	Result	Ref.
2015	18th Málaga Film Festival	Silver Biznaga for Best Actress	Natalia de Molina	Won	
2015	18th Málaga Film Festival	Audience Award		Won	
2016	30th Goya Awards	Best Actress	Natalia de Molina	Won	
2016	30th Goya Awards	Best New Director	Juan Miguel del Castillo	Nominated	
2016	30th Goya Awards	Best Original Song	"Techo y comida" by Daniel Quiñones Perulero and Miguel Carabante Manzano	Nominated	
2016	60th Sant Jordi Awards	Best Spanish Actress	Natalia de Molina	Won	

== See also ==
- List of Spanish films of 2015
