= Magallanes (film) =

2014 film

- Theatrical poster
- Directed by: Salvador del Solar
- Written by: Salvador del Solar
- Starring: Damián Alcázar; Magaly Solier; Christian Meier; Bruno Odar; Federico Luppi
- Production company: Tondero Producciones
- Release dates: 22 September 2014 (San Sebastián); 20 August 2015 (Peru)
- Running time: 105 minutes
- Country: Peru
- Language: Spanish

Magallanes is a 2014 Peruvian drama film written and directed by Salvador del Solar. It was screened in the Contemporary World Cinema section of the 2015 Toronto International Film Festival. In 2016 it won the Havana Star Prize for Best Film (Fiction) at the Havana Film Festival New York.

== Cast ==
- Damián Alcázar as Harvey Magallanes
- Magaly Solier as Celina
