= A Perfect Day (2015 film) =

2015 film

- Theatrical release poster
- Directed by: Fernando León de Aranoa
- Written by: Fernando León de Aranoa; Diego Fairas (Note: Collaborating writer)
- Based on: Dejarse Llover by Paula Farias
- Produced by: Fernando Leon de Aranoa; Jaume Roures
- Starring: Olga Kurylenko; Benicio del Toro; Tim Robbins; Mélanie Thierry
- Cinematography: Alex Catalán
- Edited by: Nacho Ruiz Capillas
- Music by: Arnau Bataller
- Production companies: Mediapro; Reposado Producciones; TVE
- Distributed by: Universal Pictures
- Release dates: 16 May 2015 (Cannes); 26 August 2015 (Spain)
- Running time: 106 minutes
- Country: Spain
- Languages: English; Croatian; Spanish; Romanian

A Perfect Day is a 2015 Spanish comedy-drama film written and directed by Fernando León de Aranoa. It is based on the novel Dejarse Llover by Paula Farias. It was screened in the Directors' Fortnight section at the 2015 Cannes Film Festival and is the director's English-language debut.

== Plot ==
Veteran humanitarian aid workers Mambrú (Benicio del Toro) and B (Tim Robbins), and newcomer Sophie (Mélanie Thierry), accompanied by their interpreter Damir (Fedja Štukan), try to retrieve a corpse from a well somewhere in former Yugoslavia at the end of the Yugoslav Wars.

Their first attempt fails because their rope tears, so they set out to find another rope, which turns out to be more difficult than expected. They are joined in their endeavor by Mambrú's former lover Katya (Olga Kurylenko) and a young local boy named Nikola.

== Cast ==
- Benicio del Toro as Mambrú
- Tim Robbins as B
- Olga Kurylenko as Katya
- Mélanie Thierry as Sophie
- Fedja Štukan as Damir
- Eldar Residovic as Nikola
- Sergi López as Goyo

== Reception ==
On Rotten Tomatoes, the film holds a 71% approval rating, based on 58 reviews. The consensus reads: "Aid workers get their due in A Perfect Day, which is just different and well-acted enough to overcome its logy pace and narrative clichés". On Metacritic, the film holds a score of 60 out of 100, sampled from 20 critics, indicating "mixed or average reviews".

Manohla Dargis of The New York Times said that, the film is "a serviceable, watchable movie". Henry Barnes of The Guardian compared the film's humor to that of M*A*S*H, while Chris Nashawaty of Entertainment Weekly criticized female characters of Mélanie Thierry and Olga Kurylenko for being "disappointingly thin".

== Awards and nominations ==
Awards	Category	Nominated	Result
III Premios Feroz	Best Comedy		Nominated
III Premios Feroz	Best Director	Fernando León de Aranoa	Nominated
III Premios Feroz	Best Screenplay	Fernando León de Aranoa, with the collaboration of Diego Farias	Nominated
III Premios Feroz	Best Film Poster		Nominated
30th Goya Awards	Best Film		Nominated
30th Goya Awards	Best Director	Fernando León de Aranoa	Nominated
30th Goya Awards	Best Adapted Screenplay	Fernando León de Aranoa	Won
30th Goya Awards	Best Supporting Actor	Tim Robbins	Nominated
30th Goya Awards	Best Cinematography	Alex Catalán	Nominated
30th Goya Awards	Best Editing	Nacho Ruiz Capillas	Nominated
30th Goya Awards	Best Production Supervision	Luis Fernández Lago	Nominated
30th Goya Awards	Best Costume Design	Fernando García	Nominated

Benicio del Toro was presented with the honorary award, Heart of Sarajevo, at the Sarajevo Film Festival.

== See also ==
- List of Spanish films of 2015
