= An Autumn Without Berlin =

- Spanish: Un otoño sin Berlín
- Directed by: Lara Izagirre
- Written by: Lara Izagirre
- Produced by: Gorka Izagirre
- Starring: Irene Escolar; Tamar Novas; Ramón Barea
- Cinematography: Gaizka Bourgeaud
- Edited by: Ibai Elortza
- Music by: Joseba Brit
- Release dates: 22 September 2015 (SSIFF); 13 November 2015 (Spain)
- Running time: 95 minutes
- Country: Spain
- Language: Spanish

An Autumn Without Berlin (Spanish: Un otoño sin Berlín) is a 2015 Spanish drama film written and directed by Lara Izagirre and starring Irene Escolar and Tamar Novas.

Escolar won the Goya Award for Best New Actress for her performance.

== Cast ==
- Irene Escolar as June
- Tamar Novas as Diego
- Lier Quesada as Nico
- Naiara Carmona as Ane
- Ramón Barea as Aita
- Mariano Estudillo as Aitor
- Itziar Ituño as Sofía
- Patricia López Arnaiz as Presenter

== Awards ==
Awards	Category	Nominated	Result
Goya Awards	Best New Actress	Irene Escolar	Won
Feroz Awards	Best Actress	Irene Escolar	Nominated
