= Felices 140 =

- Film poster
- Directed by: Gracia Querejeta
- Written by: Gracia Querejeta; Antonio Mercero
- Produced by: Gerardo Herrero; Mariela Besuievsky; Carlos Rodríguez; Javier López Blanco
- Starring: Maribel Verdú; Eduard Fernández; Antonio de la Torre; Marián Álvarez; Nora Navas
- Cinematography: Juan Carlos Gómez
- Edited by: Leire Alonso
- Music by: Federico Jusid
- Production companies: Foresta Films; Hernández y Fernández Producciones Cinematográficas; La ignorancia de la sangre Tornasol Films
- Distributed by: Sony Pictures
- Release date: 10 April 2015
- Running time: 97 minutes
- Country: Spain
- Language: Spanish
- Box office: €931,202 (Spain)

Felices 140 is a 2015 Spanish comedy-drama film directed by Gracia Querejeta. It was co-written by Querejeta and Antonio Mercero. It was released in Spain on April 10, 2015. On September 8, 2015 it was one of the three entries shortlisted to represent Spain at the 88th Academy Awards in the category for Best Foreign Language Film, but was not selected.

== Plot ==
Elia gathers a group of friends and family at a fancy holiday home to celebrate her 40th birthday. The guests do not expect what Elia has to tell them: she has won the EuroMillions lottery jackpot worth 140 million euros. When they receive the news about the jackpot, the guests start planning how they are going to end up with the money.

== Cast ==
- Maribel Verdú as Elia
- Antonio de la Torre as Juan
- Eduard Fernández as Ramón
- Nora Navas as Martina
- Marián Álvarez as Cati
- Alex O'Dogherty as Polo
- Paula Cancio as Claudia
- Ginés García Millán as Mario
- Marcos Ruiz as Bruno

== Awards and nominations ==
Awards	Category	Nominated	Result
3rd Feroz Awards	Best Supporting Actress	Marian Álvarez	Nominated
30th Goya Awards	Best Supporting Actress	Marian Álvarez	Nominated
30th Goya Awards	Best Supporting Actress	Nora Navas	Nominated

== See also ==
- List of Spanish films of 2015
