= Ma Ma (2015 film) =

2015 Spanish film

- Theatrical release poster
- Directed by: Julio Medem
- Written by: Julio Medem
- Produced by: Penélope Cruz; Julio Medem; Álvaro Longoria
- Starring: Penélope Cruz; Luis Tosar; Asier Etxeandia; Teo Planell; Silvia Abascal; Alex Brendemühl
- Cinematography: Kiko de la Rica
- Edited by: Julio Medem; Iván Aledo
- Music by: Alberto Iglesias
- Production companies: Morena Films; Mare Nostrum Productions
- Distributed by: Entertainment One Films
- Release date: 11 September 2015
- Running time: 111 minutes
- Countries: Spain; France
- Language: Spanish
- Box office: $1.377 million

Ma Ma (Spanish: Ma ma) is a 2015 Spanish-French drama film directed by Julio Medem. It was screened in the Special Presentations section of the 2015 Toronto International Film Festival. The film follows Magda (Penélope Cruz), a Madrid teacher diagnosed with breast cancer, who forms a relationship with a soccer scout facing his own tragedy and decides to carry their child to term despite her terminal illness.

== Plot ==
The story takes place in Spain from 2012 to 2013. Magda (Penélope Cruz) is an unemployed teacher living in Madrid with her young son, Dani. Her husband has recently left her for a younger woman, leaving her emotionally shaken. One day during a routine checkup, Magda discovers a lump in her breast. The biopsy confirms she has breast cancer. She tries to face the diagnosis bravely, focusing her energy on Dani, who is passionate about soccer.

At one of Dani’s matches, Magda meets Arturo, a talent scout for Real Madrid. That same day, Arturo receives terrible news: his wife and daughter have been in a car accident. His daughter later dies, and his wife remains comatose. Bonded by tragedy, Magda and Arturo form a close friendship that gradually becomes a romantic relationship.

Magda undergoes a mastectomy and chemotherapy. Despite the physical and emotional strain, she continues to care for Dani and support Arturo in his grief. Eventually, she learns that her cancer has spread and is terminal. Around the same time, she discovers she is pregnant with Arturo’s child. Although the pregnancy complicates her health further, Magda decides to carry the baby to term, believing it is a gift of life in the midst of her decline.

As her illness worsens, Magda prepares her family for her death. She insists on honesty with Dani and tries to fill his remaining time with her with warmth and courage. In the end, she gives birth to a daughter, whom she names Natasha. After the birth, Magda’s health rapidly deteriorates, and she dies shortly afterward.

The film closes with the image of her family left behind — devastated, but bound together by Magda’s love and sacrifice.

== Cast ==
- Penélope Cruz as Magda
- Luis Tosar as Arturo
- Asier Etxeandia as Julián
- Àlex Brendemühl as Raúl
- Silvia Abascal as Nurse
- Teo Planell
- Samuel Viyuela
- Virginia Ávila as ICU Nurse
- Anna Jiménez as Natasha
- Elena Carranza as TV reporter

== Reception ==
Allan Hunter of Screen Daily lauded the strong cast but lamented that the "schmaltzy script and uneven tone of the film conspire to upstage [Cruz's] performance and diminish our capacity to feel moved by it".

Peter Bradshaw of The Guardian rated the Ma Ma 4 out of 5 stars, declaring it "a gorgeous, heartfelt film".

Andy Webster of The New York Times lamented finding Cruz having to carry "a melodrama only glancing at profundity".

== Awards and nominations ==
Year	Award	Category	Nominee(s)	Result	Ref.
2016	3rd Feroz Awards	Best Main Actress in a Film	Penélope Cruz	Nominated	
2016	3rd Feroz Awards	Best Original Soundtrack	Alberto Iglesias	Nominated	
2016	30th Goya Awards	Best Actress	Penélope Cruz	Nominated	
2016	30th Goya Awards	Best Makeup and Hairstyles	Ana Lozano, Fito Dellibarda and Massimo Gattabrusi	Nominated	
2016	30th Goya Awards	Best Original Score	Alberto Iglesias	Nominated	

== See also ==
- List of Spanish films of 2015
