= Fernando León de Aranoa =

Spanish film director and screenwriter

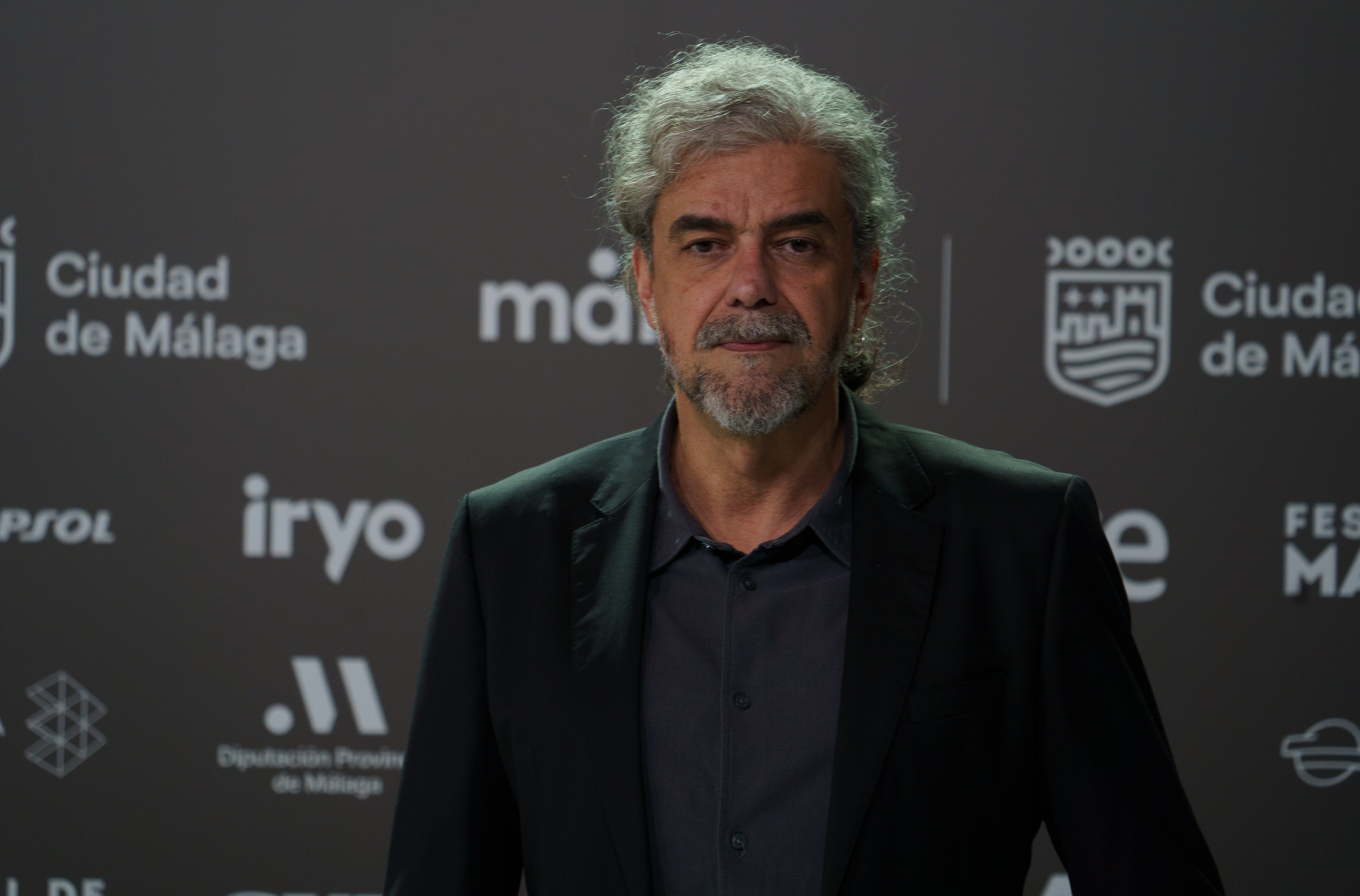
- León de Aranoa in 2025
- Born: 26 May 1968 (age 57); Madrid, Spain
- Other names: Fernando León
- Occupation(s): Film director, screenwriter
- Years active: 1996–present

Fernando León de Aranoa (born 26 May 1968) is a Spanish screenwriter and film director.

León de Aranoa entered the film industry as a screenwriter. He made his feature film directorial debut with Familia, which won him the Goya Award for Best New Director. He is together with Pedro Almodóvar the awardee with most Goya Awards for Best Director (3), which he won with Barrio (1998), Mondays in the Sun (2002), and The Good Boss (2021).

== Career ==
Born on 26 May 1968 in Madrid, Fernando León de Aranoa was drawn to painting since early childhood and wanted to become an artist. He was good at music and sports and had a passion for comics. Because of an administrative mistake, he enrolled into a degree in Image and Sound instead of an intended degree in Fine Arts.

It was while taking classes of Image that his interest in films was awakened. He also studied literature and writing; Joaquín Oristrell was one of his teachers. He began to write short stories, winning awards for his narratives. Meanwhile, he had a job drawing for an advertising agency, but quit the job to pursue a career as a screenwriter. With help from his literature and writing teachers, he found a job writing scripts for television. He became involved in films for the first time as a screenwriter on three undistinguished films directed by Antonio del Real. León de Aranoa then moved on to become a director, making the short film Sirenas (1994) which received a number of awards.

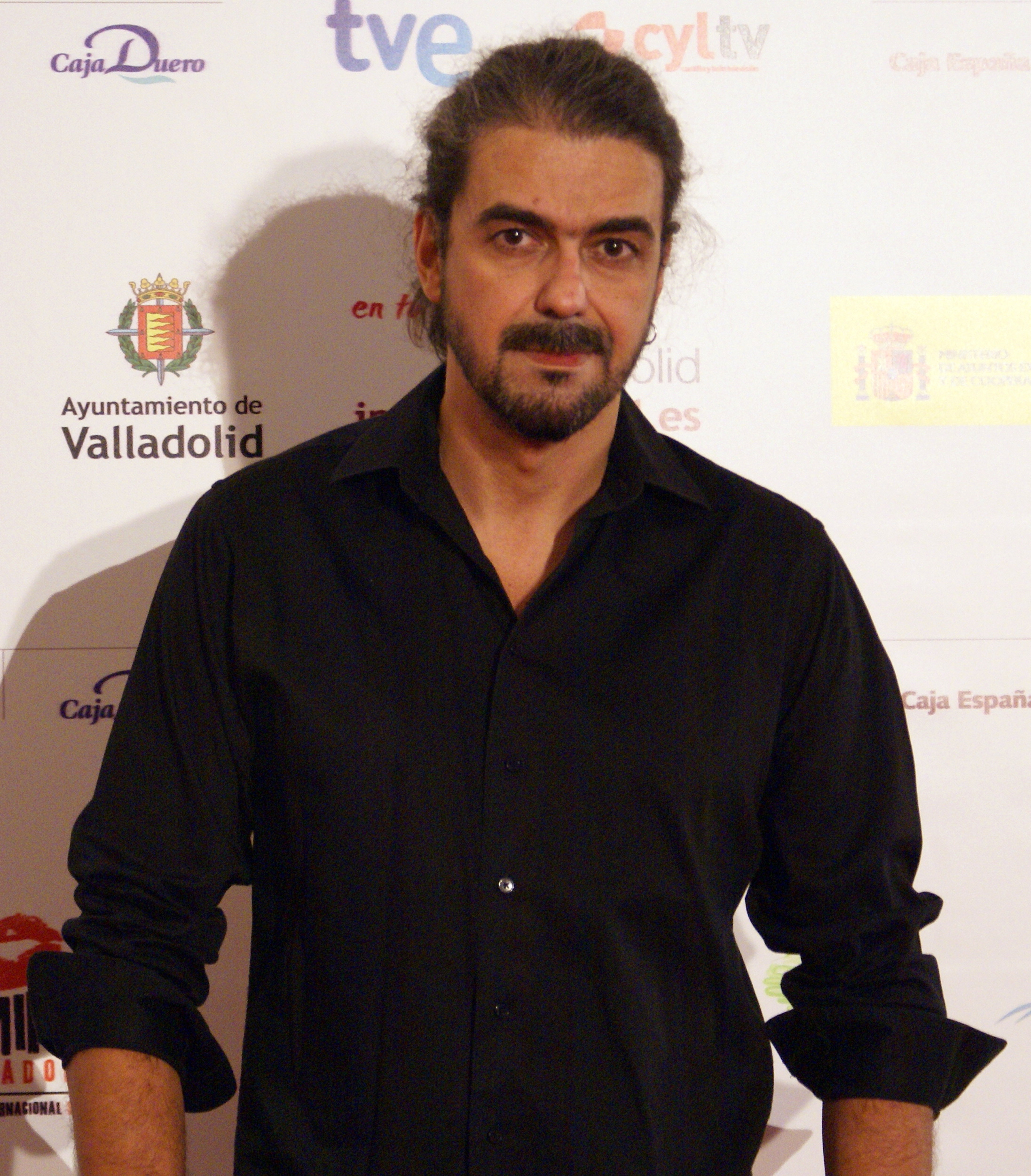
León de Aranoa attending the 2011 Seminci

His first feature film was Familia (1996), for which he also wrote the screenplay. For this film León de Aranoa was given the Goya Award for Best New Director, as well as the Audience Award and Special Mention from FIPRESCI at the Valladolid SEMINCI festival. The screenplay was later adapted into a theatrical play produced in several countries.

In 1998 he wrote and directed Barrio, a portrait of the lives of three young teens in a slum. Thanks to this film, León de Aranoa received the Goya Awards for Best Director and Best Original Screenplay. The film was presented in the official section of the San Sebastian Festival, where León de Aranoa earned the Silver Shell for Best Director. The film received other major awards such as the FIPRESCI Prize, the Fotogramas de Plata Award for Best Spanish Film, the José María Forqué Prize, the Sant Jordi Award and the Turia Award.

In 2002 he directed Mondays in the Sun, starring Javier Bardem, which became a major winner at the Goya Awards that year, winning five awards including Best Picture and Best Director. The film also triumphed in the San Sebastian Film Festival, winning the Golden Shell for Best Film. The Spanish Academy of Arts and Cinematographic Sciences selected the film to represent Spain at the Oscars in the category of Best Foreign Language Film, although it ended up not being one of the five films nominated.

Princesses (2005) would be his fourth film as director and screenwriter, and his debut as a producer after he created his own production company, Reposado. The film was seen by more than a million viewers, and received three Goya Awards from the Spanish Academy of Cinema, for Best Actor, Best Actress and Best Original Song, composed by Manu Chao. The Ondas Awards gave Princesses its Film of the Year Award and Best Film Actors Award. The film was also part of the official selection of the Sundance Film Festival.

As a documentary filmmaker León de Aranoa directed the Mexican film Walkers (2001), which won festival awards in Havana, Los Angeles, New York City and Alcalá de Henares. In 2007 he took part in the documentary Invisibles directing the chapter entitled "Buenas Noches, Ouma". This documentary also featured the participation of the directors Mariano Barroso, Isabel Coixet, Wim Wenders and Javier Corcuera and was given the Goya Award for Best Documentary. In addition, in 1994 he collaborated in the direction of Izbieglize, and in 2000 he wrote the script for the documentary The Back of the World.

In addition to writing his own films, León de Aranoa has worked as a screenwriter for other directors; he wrote the screenplays for Crazy Heart (1997) and Fausto 5.0 (2001). He has published several short stories, having received by Antonio Machado Prize twice. He has also worked as a cartoonist and illustrator.

His film A Perfect Day was selected to be screened in the Directors' Fortnight section at the 2015 Cannes Film Festival.

== Filmography ==
=== Film ===
Year	Title	Director	Writer	Producer	Notes
1994	¡Por fin solos!	No	Yes	No	
1995	Los hombres siempre mienten	No	Yes	No	
1995	Sirenas	Yes	Yes	No	Short film
1996	Familia	Yes	Yes	No	
1997	Corazón loco	No	Story	No	
1998	Insomnio	No	Yes	No	
1998	Cha-cha-chá	No	Yes	No	
1998	Barrio	Yes	Yes	No	
2000	Living It Up	No	Yes	No	
2001	Fausto 5.0	No	Yes	No	
2002	Los lunes al sol	Yes	Yes	No	
2005	Princesas	Yes	Yes	Yes	
2010	Amador	Yes	Yes	Yes	
2015	A Perfect Day	Yes	Yes	Yes	
2017	Loving Pablo	Yes	Yes	No	
2021	El buen patrón	Yes	Yes	Yes	

=== Documentary ===
Year	Title	Director	Writer	Producer	Notes
2000	La espalda del mundo	No	Yes	No	
2001	Caminantes (Walkers)	Yes	Yes	No	
2002	La guerrilla de la memoria	No	Yes	No	
2007	Invisibles	Yes	Yes	No	Segment "Buenas noches, Ouma"
2016	Política, manual de instrucciones	Yes	Yes	Yes	
2022	Sintiéndolo mucho	Yes	Yes	Yes	

== Awards and nominations ==
Year	Work	Award	Category	Result	Ref(s)
1996	Familia	Valladolid International Film Festival	Best New Director	Won	
1997	Familia	Mystfest	Best Film	Nominated	
1998	Familia	Goya Awards	Best Original Screenplay	Nominated	
1998	Familia	Goya Awards	Best New Director	Won	
1998	Familia	CEC Medals	Revelation Award	Won	
1998	Barrio	San Sebastián International Film Festival	Golden Shell	Nominated	
1998	Barrio	San Sebastián International Film Festival	Silver Shell for Best Director	Won	
1998	Barrio	San Sebastián International Film Festival	CEC Award	Won	
1999	Barrio	CEC Medals	Best Director	Won	
1999	Barrio	Goya Awards	Best Director	Won	
1999	Barrio	Goya Awards	Best Original Screenplay	Won	
2002	Los lunes al sol	San Sebastián International Film Festival	Golden Shell	Won	
2002	Los lunes al sol	San Sebastián International Film Festival	FIPRESCI Award	Won	
2002	Los lunes al sol	San Sebastián International Film Festival	SIGNIS Award	Won	
2002	Los lunes al sol	Ondas Awards	Best Spanish Film	Won	
2002	Los lunes al sol	European Film Awards	Best Director - Audience Award	Won	
2003	Los lunes al sol	CEC Medals	Best Director	Won	
2003	Los lunes al sol	CEC Medals	Best Original Screenplay	Won	
2003	Los lunes al sol	Goya Awards	Best Director	Won	
2003	Los lunes al sol	Goya Awards	Best Original Screenplay	Nominated	
2004	Los lunes al sol	Ariel Awards	Best Ibero-American Film	Won	
2004	Los lunes al sol	David di Donatello	Best European Film	Nominated	
2006	Princesas	Sundance Film Festival	World Cinema Jury Prize: Dramatic	Nominated	
2006	Princesas	Forqué Awards	Best Film	Nominated	
2006	Princesas	CEC Medals	Best Film	Nominated	
2006	Princesas	CEC Medals	Best Director	Nominated	
2006	Princesas	CEC Medals	Best Original Screenplay	Nominated	
2006	Princesas	Goya Awards	Best Film	Nominated	
2006	Princesas	Goya Awards	Best Original Screenplay	Nominated	
2008	Invisibles	Forqué Awards	Best Documentary or Animated Film	Won	
2008	Invisibles	Goya Awards	Best Documentary	Won	
2016	A Perfect Day	Feroz Awards	Best Comedy Film	Nominated	
2016	A Perfect Day	Feroz Awards	Best Director	Nominated	
2016	A Perfect Day	Feroz Awards	Best Screenplay	Nominated	
2016	A Perfect Day	Goya Awards	Best Film	Nominated	
2016	A Perfect Day	Goya Awards	Best Director	Nominated	
2016	A Perfect Day	Goya Awards	Best Adapted Screenplay	Won	
2016	A Perfect Day	David di Donatello	Best European Film	Nominated	
2021	El buen patrón	San Sebastián International Film Festival	Golden Shell	Nominated	
2021	El buen patrón	CiBRA Festival	Best Original Screenplay	Won	
2021	El buen patrón	Forqué Awards	Best Film	Won	
2022	El buen patrón	Feroz Awards	Best Comedy Film	Won	
2022	El buen patrón	Feroz Awards	Best Director	Nominated	
2022	El buen patrón	Feroz Awards	Best Screenplay	Won	
2022	El buen patrón	CEC Medals	Best Film	Nominated	
2022	El buen patrón	CEC Medals	Best Direction	Nominated	
2022	El buen patrón	CEC Medals	Best Original Screenplay	Nominated	
2022	El buen patrón	Goya Awards	Best Film	Won	
2022	El buen patrón	Goya Awards	Best Director	Won	
2022	El buen patrón	Goya Awards	Best Original Screenplay	Won	
2022	El buen patrón	Satellite Awards	Best Foreign Language Film	Nominated	
2022	El buen patrón	Spanish Screenwriters' Union Awards	Best Screenplay in a Comedy Feature Film	Won	
2022	El buen patrón	Platino Awards	Best Ibero-American Film	Won	
2022	El buen patrón	Platino Awards	Best Director	Won	
2022	El buen patrón	Platino Awards	Best Screenplay	Won	
2022	El buen patrón	Ariel Awards	Best Ibero-American Film	Won	
2022	El buen patrón	European Film Awards	Best European Comedy	Won	
2022	Sintiéndolo Mucho	Forqué Awards	Best Documentary or Animated Film	Nominated	
2023	Sintiéndolo Mucho	Goya Awards	Best Documentary	Nominated	
