= Lucas Vidal =

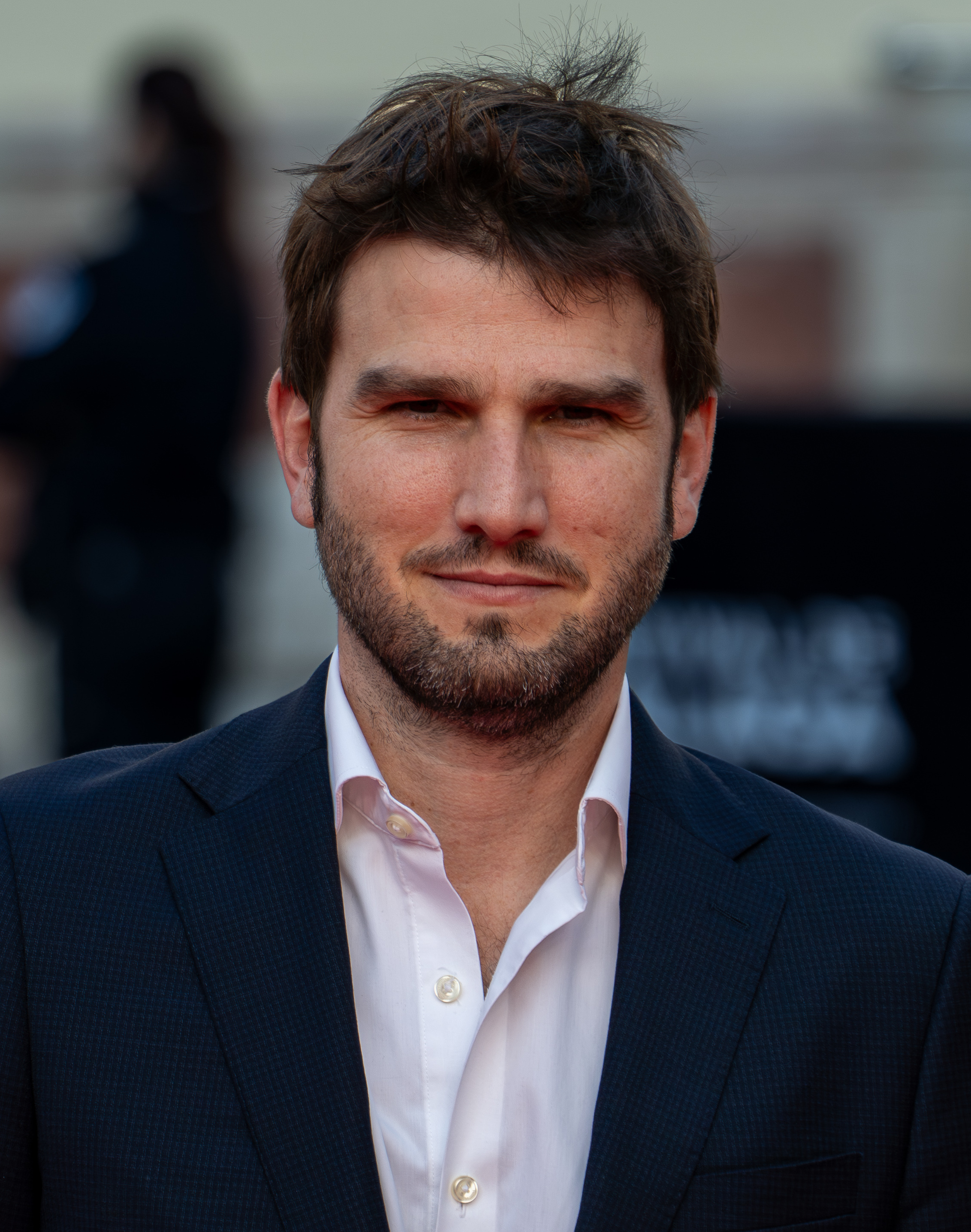
- Vidal in 2026

Background information
- Born: 6 March 1984 (age 42); Madrid, Spain
- Genres: Film score
- Occupations: Composer, conductor, music producer
- Years active: 2006 – present

Lucas Vidal (born 6 March 1984) is a Spanish composer, conductor, and record producer. Vidal became the youngest Berklee College of Music student ever to compose and record the score to a feature film with a full orchestra, and he is best known for composing the score for the 2013 film Fast & Furious 6.

== Life ==
Lucas Vidal was born and grew up in Madrid. His father is also a musician, and his grandfather was one of the founders of the record company Hispavox. He began studying piano and flute at age 4. When he was 16 years old, he went to Berklee College of Music for a summer term to play sax and was introduced to the film scoring department. Vidal decided that he wanted to pursue a career as a film composer. He met his business partner, Steve Dzialowski, and decided to create a company, Music and Motion Productions, while attending Berklee. Vidal made history when he became the youngest Berklee College of Music student ever to compose and record the score to a feature film with a full orchestra. Hundreds of recording sessions and dozens of movie scores, commercial music jobs, video game soundtracks and ballet scores later, Vidal is getting his biggest-ever assignments. After studying with a scholarship to the Berklee College of Music, he received his bachelor's degree with Summa Cum Laude and moved to New York City, where he studied at Juilliard and worked on some TV movies for NBC Universal and European projects. Then he decided to move to Los Angeles.

Vidal received more widespread attention in 2011 when he was nominated for Breakout Composer of the Year by the International Film Music Critics Association for the film “Sleep Tight” ("Mientras Duermes”). In 2012, he composed the musical score for Fast & Furious 6. Other recent projects include The Raven with John Cusack and The Cold Light of Day starring Bruce Willis and Sigourney Weaver, resulting in a nomination for “Discovery of the Year” at the World Soundtrack Awards

In 2015, Vidal co-founded CHROMA with Steve Dzialowski and Chris Ramsdell. CHROMA has created music for trailers such as The Hunger Games, The Terminator, and Interstellar as well as commercials such as Gatorade, Wendy's, and AT&T.

In December, Lucas Vidal conducts the official Christmas concert at the Teatro Real in Madrid, playing music by John Williams and his original music too.

Vidal composed the "Olympic Suite for ESPN” for the 2016 Summer Olympics in Rio de Janeiro, Brazil. Later, he was awarded an Emmy for the best original music. He worked as well on recent movies such as Happy Sad, The Tree of Blood, The Best Day of My Life.

He won the Goya for Best Score for the movie Endless Night.

== Personal life ==
He lives in Los Angeles and splits his time between his self-made Music and Motion Productions Studios in Venice, California, and Madrid, Spain. In an interview, he said: “Hollywood has zero glamour for me,” he says. “You work a lot. I get up very early, I go to the studio, I eat in front of the computer, I carry on working and then go to sleep. Only on Tuesdays do I let myself play ping-pong at a club.” At the age of 20, Vidal was diagnosed with cancer. During his chemotherapy treatment, which he underwent in Madrid, he could only think about two things: eating snails and composing film music and finally overcame cancer after three months of chemotherapy.

In an interview with Benoit Basirico he said that he had relationships with other Spanish composers: "I have a really good relationship with all the Spanish composers. We are a very small community. I am a close friend of Javier Navarrete and was so sad when he moved back to Spain last year. I am so happy he is doing so well, though. I love Alberto Iglesias, who I consider a genius. He is also the nicest and most humble person I know.” and talked about other composers “I am a big fan of Alexandre Desplat, I think his music is simply amazing and his range of scores is surreal. He is a true composer before being a film composer. I like Alan Silvestri a lot, too. I conducted at the Boston Symphony Hall with him a couple of months ago, and I must say that he is a wonderful person.”

== Stage ==
- 2012: The Eighth Layer (Boston Ballet with choreography by Yury Yanowsky)

== Filmography ==
- 2009: The Immortal Voyage of Captain Drake
- 2009: Hammer of the Gods
- 2009: The Island Inside
- 2010: Vanishing on 7th Street
- 2011: Sleep Tight
- 2012: The Raven
- 2012: The Cold Light of Day
- 2012: Invasor
- 2012: Afterparty
- 2013: The Quiet Ones
- 2013: Fast & Furious 6
- 2013: Mindscape
- 2013: Tracers
- 2014: Kidnapping Mr. Heineken
- 2015: Nobody Wants the Night
- 2015: Remember It
- 2015: Palm Trees in the Snow
- 2016: Realive
- 2018: The Best Day of My Life
- 2018: El Árbol de la Sangre
- 2018: Alegría, Tristeza
- 2019: Paradise Hills

== Awards ==
Year	Result	Award	Category	Nominated work	Ref.
2009	Won	Palermo International Sport Film Festival	Golden Knight	Basket Bronx	
2012	Nominated	World Soundtrack Awards	World Soundtrack Award	Sleep Tight	
2012	Nominated	Gaudí Awards	Gaudí Award	Sleep Tight	
2012	Won	Las Vegas International Film Festival	Silver Ace Award	Green Guys	
2016	Won	Goya Awards	Best original music	Nobody Wants the Night	
2016	Nominated	III Premios Feroz	Best original music	Palm Trees in the Snow	
