= Nothing in Return =

- Theatrical release poster
- Directed by: Daniel Guzmán
- Starring: Miguel Herrán; Antonio Bachiller
- Distributed by: Warner Bros. Pictures
- Release dates: 23 April 2015 (MFF); 8 May 2015 (Spain)
- Running time: 93 minutes
- Country: Spain
- Language: Spanish

Nothing in Return (Spanish: A cambio de nada) is a 2015 Spanish drama film directed by Daniel Guzmán.

== Cast ==
- Miguel Herrán - Darío
- Antonio Bachiller - Luismi
- Antonia Guzmán - Antonia
- Felipe García Vélez - Justo Caralimpia
- Luis Tosar - Padre Darío
- María Miguel - Madre Darío
- Miguel Rellán - Professor

== Acting debut ==
Miguel Herrán's chance encounter with actor and director Daniel Guzmán in the streets of Madrid led to Herrán auditioning for the role of Darío in Nothing in Return, which would earn him the Goya Award for Best New Actor.

== See also ==
- List of Spanish films of 2015
