= Requirements to Be a Normal Person =

- Original title: Requisitos para ser una personal normal
- Directed by: Leticia Dolera
- Starring: Leticia Dolera; Manuel Burque
- Release date: 4 June 2015
- Running time: 90 minutes
- Country: Spain
- Language: Spanish

Requirements to Be a Normal Person (Spanish: Requisitos para ser una persona normal) is a 2015 Spanish comedy film directed by Leticia Dolera, which stars Dolera alongside Manuel Burque.

== Cast ==
- Leticia Dolera as María de las Montañas
- Manuel Burque as Borja
- Sílvia Munt as Bárbara
- Jordi Llodrà as Álex
- Miki Esparbé as Gustavo
- Alexandra Jiménez as Cristina Pi
- Blanca Apilánez as Estefanía
- Jorge Suquet as Pablo
- Nuria Gago as Noelia

== See also ==
- List of Spanish films of 2015
