= Truman (2015 film) =

2015 film

- Original Spanish theatrical release poster
- Directed by: Cesc Gay
- Written by: Tomàs Aragay; Cesc Gay
- Produced by: Marta Esteban; Diego Dubcovsky
- Starring: Ricardo Darín; Javier Cámara; Dolores Fonzi
- Cinematography: Andreu Rebés
- Edited by: Pablo Barbieri
- Music by: Nico Cota; Toti Soler
- Production companies: Imposible Films; BD Cine; Trumanfilm AIE; K&S Films; Telefé
- Distributed by: Filmax (Spain); Buena Vista International (Argentina)
- Release dates: 12 September 2015 (TIFF); 24 September 2015 (Argentina); 30 October 2015 (Spain)
- Running time: 109 minutes
- Countries: Spain; Argentina
- Languages: Spanish; English
- Budget: $3.8 million
- Box office: $9 million

Truman is a 2015 comedy-drama film directed by Cesc Gay and co-written by Gay and Tomàs Aragay. The film stars Ricardo Darín, Javier Cámara, and Dolores Fonzi.

It won five Goya Awards, including Best Film, Best Director, Best Original Screenplay, Best Actor (Darín), and Best Supporting Actor (Cámara).

== Plot ==
Julián, living in Madrid, receives an unexpected visit from his friend, Tomás, a professor living in Canada. Julián is an actor and has had cancer for a year, and his only companion now is Truman, his loyal dog. The friends and Truman share four days together.

Julián reveals he is opting for assisted suicide rather than chemotherapy if his health deteriorates. His cousin Paula and Tomás are disturbed by the news and share emotional and meaningful moments during Tomás's visit. They try to cope with Julián's situation. Julián gives his dog to his friend and they bid goodbye after an intense conversation.

== Cast ==
- Ricardo Darín as Julián
- Javier Cámara as Tomás
- Dolores Fonzi as Paula
- Eduard Fernández as Luis
- Àlex Brendemühl as Veterinario
- Pedro Casablanc as Médico
- José Luis Gómez as Productor
- Javier Gutiérrez as Asesor funeraria
- Elvira Mínguez as Gloria
- Oriol Pla as Nico
- Nathalie Poza as Mujer 2
- Àgata Roca as Mujer 1
- Susi Sánchez as Mujer Adopción
- Francesc Orella as Actor Restaurante
- Ana Gracia as Actriz Restaurante
- Silvia Abascal as Mónica

== Production ==
The film was produced by Impossible Films (Marta Esteban), BD Cine (Diego Dubcovsky) and Trumanfilm AIE alongside K&S Films and Telefé, with the participation of TVE, TVC and Movistar+.

== Release ==
It was screened in the Contemporary World Cinema section of the 2015 Toronto International Film Festival and in the Official Section of the 2015 San Sebastián International Film Festival, where it was awarded the Silver Shell for Best Actor for Darín and Cámara.

Distributed by Filmax, the film was theatrically released in Spain on 30 October 2015.

== Accolades ==
| Year | Award | Category | Nominee(s) | Result | Ref. |
|---|---|---|---|---|---|
| 2015 | 63rd San Sebastián International Film Festival | Golden Shell for Best Film | | Nominated | |
| 2015 | 63rd San Sebastián International Film Festival | Silver Shell for Best Actor | Javier Cámara, Ricardo Darín | Won | |
| 2015 | 63rd San Sebastián International Film Festival | Feroz Zinemaldia Award | | Won | |
| 2016 | 21st Forqué Awards | Best Film | | Won | |
| 2016 | 21st Forqué Awards | Best Actor | Ricardo Darín | Won | |
| 2016 | 21st Forqué Awards | Best Actor | Javier Cámara | Nominated | |
| 2016 | 3rd Feroz Awards | Best Drama Film | | Nominated | |
| 2016 | 3rd Feroz Awards | Best Director | Cesc Gay | Nominated | |
| 2016 | 3rd Feroz Awards | Best Screenplay | Cesc Gay, Tomàs Aragay | Won | |
| 2016 | 3rd Feroz Awards | Best Main Actor | Javier Cámara | Nominated | |
| 2016 | 3rd Feroz Awards | Best Main Actor | Ricardo Darín | Won | |
| 2016 | 3rd Feroz Awards | Best Supporting Actress | Dolores Fonzi | Nominated | |
| 2016 | 8th Gaudí Awards | Best Non-Catalan Language Film | | Won | |
| 2016 | 8th Gaudí Awards | Best Director | Cesc Gay | Won | |
| 2016 | 8th Gaudí Awards | Best Screenplay | Cesc Gay, Tomàs Aragay | Won | |
| 2016 | 8th Gaudí Awards | Best Actor | Ricardo Darín | Won | |
| 2016 | 8th Gaudí Awards | Best Supporting Actor | Javier Cámara | Won | |
| 2016 | 8th Gaudí Awards | Best Supporting Actress | Dolores Fonzi | Won | |
| 2016 | 8th Gaudí Awards | Best Original Score | Nico Cota | Nominated | |
| 2016 | 8th Gaudí Awards | Best Cinematography | Andreu Rebés | Nominated | |
| 2016 | 8th Gaudí Awards | Best Production Supervision | Isidro Terraza | Nominated | |
| 2016 | 8th Gaudí Awards | Best Art Direction | Irene Montcada | Nominated | |
| 2016 | 8th Gaudí Awards | Best Sound | Albert Gay, Jesica Suárez | Nominated | |
| 2016 | 30th Goya Awards | Best Film | | Won | |
| 2016 | 30th Goya Awards | Best Director | Cesc Gay | Won | |
| 2016 | 30th Goya Awards | Best Original Screenplay | Cesc Gay, Tomàs Aragay | Won | |
| 2016 | 30th Goya Awards | Best Actor | Ricardo Darín | Won | |
| 2016 | 30th Goya Awards | Best Supporting Actor | Javier Cámara | Won | |
| 2016 | 30th Goya Awards | Best Editing | Pablo Barbieri | Nominated | |
| 2016 | 21st Vilnius International Film Festival | The Audience Award | | Won | |
| 2017 | Belgian Film Critics Association | Grand Prix | | Nominated | |

== See also ==
- List of Spanish films of 2015
