= Endless Night (2015 film) =

2015 film

- Film poster
- Directed by: Isabel Coixet
- Written by: Miguel Barros
- Produced by: Jaume Roures
- Starring: Juliette Binoche; Rinko Kikuchi; Gabriel Byrne
- Cinematography: Jean-Claude Larrieu
- Edited by: Elena Ruiz
- Music by: Lucas Vidal
- Production companies: Mer Film; New Art Productions; Noodles Production; One More Movie
- Distributed by: Filmax (Spain),
- Release dates: 5 February 2015 (Berlin); 30 October 2015 (Spain)
- Running time: 118 minutes
- Countries: Spain; France; Bulgaria
- Language: English

Endless Night (Spanish: Nadie quiere la noche) is a 2015 drama film directed by Isabel Coixet. It was selected to open the 65th Berlin International Film Festival. The film is set in 1908 in Greenland and is an international co-production between Spain, France and Bulgaria. The film premiered with the title Nobody Wants the Night. Following poor reviews and sales the film was recut by Coixet and released under the title Endless Night.

== Plot ==
Greenland, 1908. Josephine, the confident and bold wife of the famous Arctic explorer, Robert Peary, embarks on a dangerous journey in pursuit of her husband who is seeking a route to the North Pole. Against the advice of her guide, Bram, to stay in town, Josephine and her expedition team reach the base camp, only to find her husband has already pushed on, leaving behind Allaka, a pregnant Inuit woman, who becomes her companion.

== Cast ==
- Rinko Kikuchi as Allaka
- Juliette Binoche as Josephine Peary
- Gabriel Byrne as Bram Trevor
- Matt Salinger as Captain Spalding
- Velizar Binev as Fyodor
- Ciro Miró as Cyrus

== Reception ==
The film received negative reviews after its Berlin premiere. Peter Bradshaw from The Guardian gave the film two stars out of five and observed that "[t]he film is possessed of blandly humanistic flavours, new-agey gestures and quaint stereotypes". The Hollywood Reporter called it "inconsistent" and "a mixed bag". In his review for Variety, Guy Lodge wrote that "[the film] is dramatically as pallid and lifeless as the frozen tundra on which it takes place". Indiewire's Jessica Kiang criticized the script and Coixet's direction, adding that "whenever it threatens to find its way, it soon loses it again".

The film received a warmer reception in Coixet's native Spain after its November release, getting three and four-star reviews from outlets such as El Mundo, Cinemanía and La Vanguardia.

== Awards and nominations ==
Awards	Category	Nominated	Result
30th Goya Awards	Best Film		Nominated
30th Goya Awards	Best Director	Isabel Coixet	Nominated
30th Goya Awards	Best Actress	Juliette Binoche	Nominated
30th Goya Awards	Best Cinematography	Jean-Claude Larrieu	Nominated
30th Goya Awards	Best Art Direction	Alain Bainée	Nominated
30th Goya Awards	Best Production Supervision	Andrés Santana and Marta Miró	Won
30th Goya Awards	Best Costume Design	Clara Bilbao	Won
30th Goya Awards	Best Makeup and Hairstyles	Pablo Perona, Paco Rodríguez H. and Sylvie Imbert	Won
30th Goya Awards	Best Original Score	Lucas Vidal	Won

== See also ==
- Survival film, about the film genre, with a list of related films
