= Cesc Gay =

Spanish film screenwriter and film director

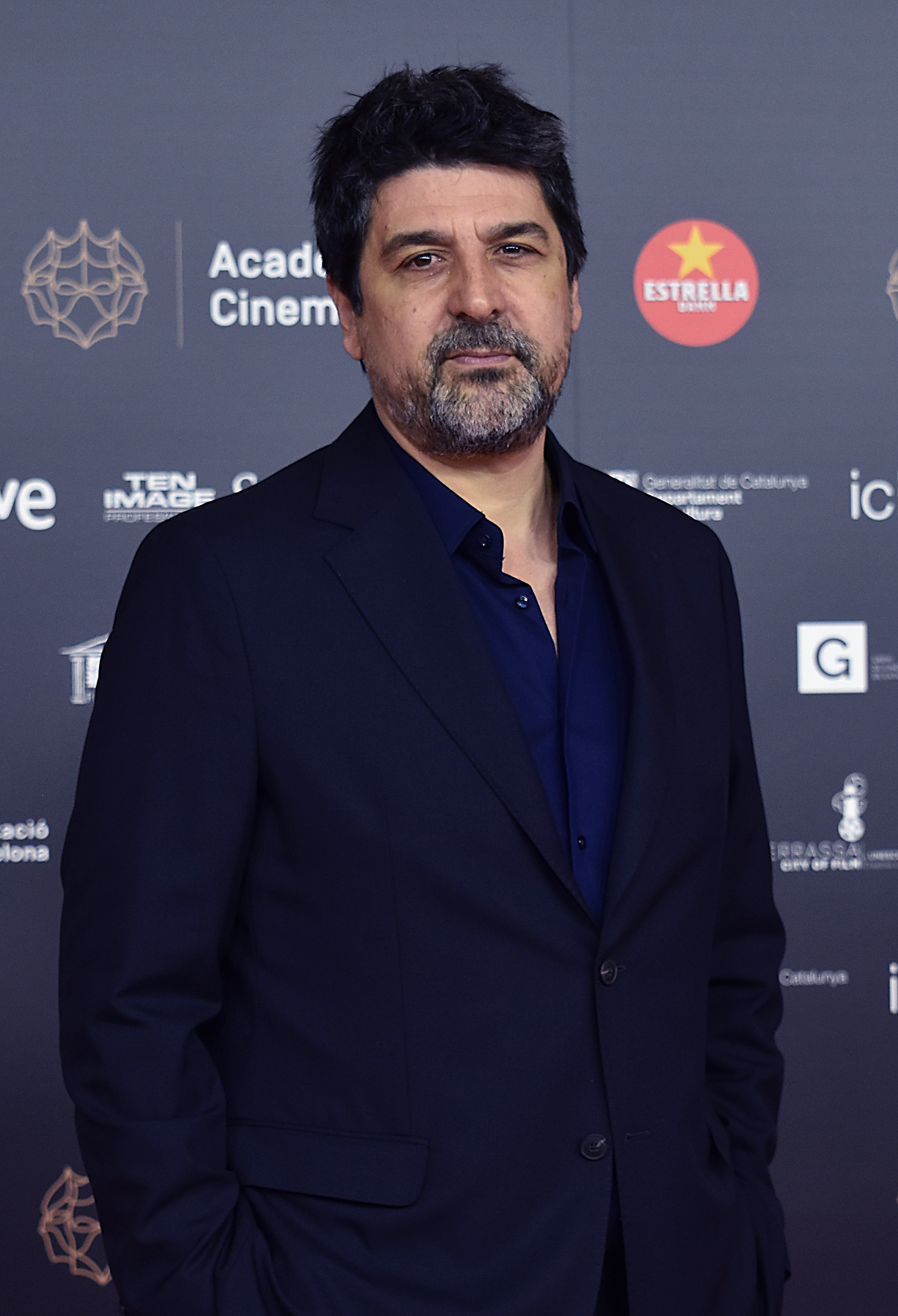
- Attending the 13th Gaudí Awards in 2021
- Born: Francesc Gay i Puig; 1967 (age 58–59); Barcelona, Spain
- Occupations: Screenwriter; film director

Francesc Gay i Puig (born 1967), better known as Cesc Gay, is a Spanish film screenwriter and film director and playwright.

== Biography ==
Francesc Gay i Puig was born in Barcelona in 1967. His 2015 film Truman won Goya Awards for Best Picture, Best Director, Best Actor (Ricardo Darín), Best Supporting Actor (Javier Cámara) and Best Original Screenplay (Cesc Gay and Tomás Aragay).

== Filmography ==
=== Film ===
Year	Title	Director	Writer	Notes	Ref.
1998	Hotel Room	Yes	Yes	Co-directed with Daniel Gimelberg	
2000	Krámpack	Yes	Yes		
2003	En la ciudad	Yes	Yes		
2006	Ficció	Yes	Yes	Also composer	
2009	V.O.S: Versión Original Subtitulada	Yes	Yes		
2010	Alex	Yes	Yes	Short film	
2012	Una pistola en cada mano	Yes	Yes		
2015	Truman	Yes	Yes		
2019	Los Adoptantes	No	Story		
2020	Sentimental	Yes	Yes		
2022	Historias para no contar	Yes	Yes		
2025	Mi amiga Eva	Yes	Yes		
2026	53 domingos	Yes	Yes		

=== Television ===
Year	Title	Director	Writer	Notes
2001–2006	Jet Lag	No	Yes	72 episodes
2009	50 Años de...	Yes	No	Episode "Canciones"
2012–2013	La Riera	No	Yes	19 episodes
2014	Encants: Diari D'Un Trasllat	No	Yes	Documentary film
2018	Félix	Yes	Yes	Miniseries

== Theatre ==
- "Els Veïns de Dalt" (2015) (Author and director)
