= Corruption in Spain =

Corruption Perceptions Index for Spain from 1995 to 2015.

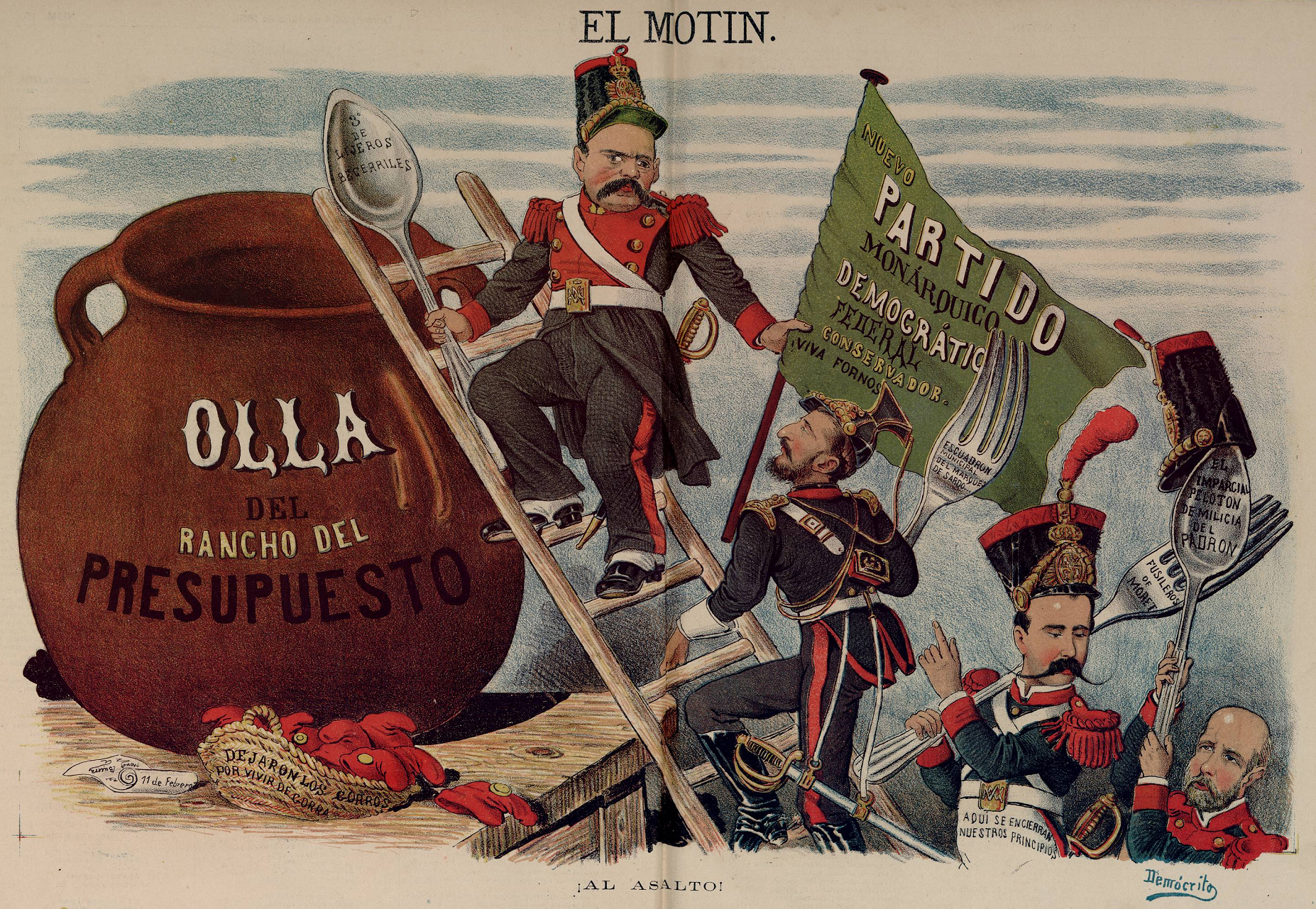
A nineteenth century Spanish cartoon satirizing political corruption

Corruption in Spain is a large concern. Political corruption is defined as the action or inaction of one or more real persons managing public resources for their own or a third party's benefit to the detriment of all the citizens they should serve and benefit. Transparency International's Global Corruption Barometer 2013 shows that the surveyed households consider political parties, Parliament and the judiciary the most corrupt institutions. In fact, the Spanish population considers corruption their second biggest problem, only eclipsed by unemployment. Following Spain's return to democracy after the end of the Franco dictatorship, the judiciary became an independent branch of government (despite being governed by a council chosen by the legislative branch of government). In the early part of the 21st century this independent judiciary was active in pursuing political corruption.

On Transparency International's 2025 Corruption Perceptions Index, Spain scored 55 on a scale from 0 ("highly corrupt") to 100 ("very clean"). When ranked by score, Spain ranked 49th among the 182 countries in the Index, where the country ranked first is perceived to have the most honest public sector. For comparison with regional scores, the best score among Western European and European Union countries (Note: Austria, Belgium, Bulgaria, Croatia, Cyprus, Czechia, Denmark, Estonia, Finland, France, Germany, Greece, Hungary, Iceland, Ireland, Italy, Latvia, Lithuania, Luxembourg, Malta, Netherlands, Norway, Poland, Portugal, Romania, Slovakia, Slovenia, Spain, Sweden, Switzerland, and the United Kingdom.) was 89, the average score was 64 and the worst score was 40. For comparison with worldwide scores, the best score was 89 (ranked 1), the average score was 42, and the worst score was 9 (ranked 181, in a two-way tie).

Transparency International also rated Spain between 2001 and 2012 using a different methodology for the Corruption Perceptions Index. The average value for Spain during that period was 66.67 points with a maximum of 70 points in 2001 and a minimum of 61 points in 2009 (100 being no corruption). In 2011 it was rated the 30th least corrupt country in the world. According to Politico, 1378 officials were prosecuted for corruption between July 2015 and September 2016.

The occurrence of petty corruption is rare in Spain, according to the Global Competitiveness Report of 2015. Bribery is not widespread in business dealings in Spain, yet companies cite corruption as a business impediment. As suggested in the Business Anti-Corruption Portal, anti-corruption strategies should be significantly strengthened at all levels of government. One example could be to strengthen investigative and prosecution efforts and enforce existing laws. Corruption in the tax administration is not an obstacle to business (Global Competitiveness Report 2015-2016). Paying taxes has been made less costly by reducing the rates for corporate income, capital gains and environmental taxes, and the time required to pay taxes is lower than the OECD countries’ average (DB 2016). Spanish tax regulations represent a moderate challenge for foreign companies.

Among Spain’s police forces, corruption is not widespread and there are only small isolated cases involving police corruption. The police services are considered reliable in protecting companies from crime (Global Competitiveness Report 2015-2016), and the necessary mechanisms are in place to investigate and punish abuse and corruption in the police services. There are isolated reports of police corruption, but these are typically resolved effectively by the authorities (HRR 2014).

== Reign of Philip III of Spain ==
The period 1598 to 1617 in which Francisco Gómez de Sandoval, 1st Duke of Lerma held the government on behalf of Philip III was one of the most notoriously corrupt of Spanish regimes. It was infamous because of the self-enrichment activities of his crony bureaucrat, Pedro Franqueza, his secretary, Rodrigo Calderón, Count of Oliva and the Duke of Lerma himself.

== 19th century ==
The Queen Regent Maria Christina of the Two Sicilies became famous for her involvement in shady deals that divided the people from the elite. Speculation in the production of salt, construction of railways and even the illegal slave trade, which also involved Ramón María Narváez, 1st Duke of Valencia. It was said that there was no industrial project in which the Queen Mother had no interest. Her fortune was estimated at 300 million Spanish reals.

Following the political chaos of 1868-1874, the new regime introduced a stabilising artificial two-party system, sustained over decades by corrupt elections deliberately designed to double political patronage so that those not currently benefiting from office could simply wait for the next planned change of government.

== Francoist Spain ==
The Nationalist military insurgents won the Spanish Civil War against the democratic Republican government. Nazi Germany, Fascist Italy, Britain and the United States supported the rebel army and Francoist government in various ways and at various times, but never supported the Second Spanish Republic. During the war, agricultural and industrial production collapsed and the black market - called Straperlo in memory of the homonymous famous scandal - acquired great importance. Economic corruption, classism and nepotism were a basic feature of Francoist Spain and were widespread. Political involvement in it up to the highest levels was absolute: in some cases due to the direct participation of high-ranking officials; in others, due to the protection that the strategists received from power. This took place in an atmosphere of total impunity.

The repercussions of corruption were socially very serious: for the corrupt and their clientele it meant rapid enrichment, while for most of the population it implied privations of all kinds: famine, ignorance, hunger, ruin and misery. Some of the major cases were:

- Lost children of Francoism
- Barcelona Traction case
- Case Matesa (in Spanish)
- Reace case (in Spanish)
- Sofico Scandal (in Spanish)

The accession of Juan Carlos I to the Spanish throne saw the advent of a democratic state built on the foundations of the Spanish Constitution of 1978 operated by largely the same institutions that had formerly served Francoist Spain. After some three decades the younger 'democracy generation' of jurists began to investigate issues (in violation of the Pact of forgetting) that had been 'overlooked' by the early reformers in pursuit of creating a peaceful and lasting state.

== Corruption cases in the post-Francoist era ==
=== GAL ===
In 1987 a judge in his early thirties, Baltasar Garzón led an investigation which led to the conviction of a former (Socialist) Interior minister, who had adopted a clandestine policy of state terrorism via operations of the Grupos Antiterroristas de Liberación (GAL), - a collection of criminal gangs who (formerly on the covert behalf of the Falange)(1937–1975) were still fighting Franco's dirty war against the Basque separatist ETA movement. The case was vigorously defended and appealed, to the Constitutional Court of Spain where the sentence was confirmed by four votes to three, and later endorsed by the European Court of Human Rights.

=== Rumasa and Nueva Rumasa ===
Rumasa (Ruiz Mateos SA) was founded in 1961 by the family of José María Ruiz Mateos. It originally exported wine to England. In 1983 it had become very large (allegedly because it was linked to Opus Dei) and so debt-ridden that it was nationalized by the socialist PSOE government of Felipe González "in the public interest".

At the time it consisted of more than 700 companies, with a staff that reached 60,000 people, with an annual turnover of about 350,000 million pesetas (more than 2,000 million euros). Eventually, parts of the empire were re-privatized.

The group was originally rooted primarily in the wine sector, and diversified into banking. Its gradual but massive growth occurred through the acquisition of companies with financial problems so it became a group of companies that (supposedly) supported each other. RUMASA was present in the following sectors:

- Wine production: Bodegas (Wineries) including Paternina, Garvey Group, Bodegas Franco-Españolas, René Barbier, Segura Viudas, Conde de Caral
- Banking: including the banks Atlantic, Jerez, Masaveu, Exbank, AVA, Eurobank, Banfisa
- Hospitality: The hotel chain "Hotasa"
- Retail: 22 Department Stores "Galerías Preciados" (since integrated into El Corte Inglés) and Spanish luxury goods "Loewe". (now part of the Louis Vuitton, Moët Hennessy LVMH group)

Following the nationalization of his empire Ruiz-Mateos fled to London and started a series of legal cases to recover some of his seized assets. In 1985 he was arrested at Frankfurt airport and extradited to Spain.

The Francoist-leaning Alianza Popular political party (now integrated into the Popular Party) failed to persuade the constitutional court to reverse the sequestration. The High Court eventually received a total of 165 claims from Ruiz-Mateos, and eventually resolved a "fair price" settlement (although the family got nothing)

Twelve years later in 1997 (shortly after the People's Party government of José María Aznar took power), the High Court absolved Ruiz-Mateos from the criminal charges, and in 1999 also the civil actions, so that his bail bonds were returned.

The family started a new company (Nueva Rumasa) with a "Busy Bee" logo that eventually comprised major brands, including The Dhul Food Group, which includes brands Cacaolat, Carcesa (which owns Apis conserved tomato products as well as Fruco tomatoes and tomato juice), Clesa dairy products, Royne ice cream, Chocolates Trapa. Wine and beverages include Los Conejos & Gabín Garres liquors, rum, rum-punch, sherry, brandy, and other related products.

The company claimed a total of 10,000 employees (the Trade union estimate was 6000) and a net worth of almost six billion. It started a huge advertising campaign to attract private investors, and was reprimanded several times by the regulatory authorities, who also issued warnings to existing and potential investors.

In 2011 the firm collapsed with a debt of 700 million Euros spread across some 23 banking institutions, private creditors and government agencies. Most of the debt arose from Dhul an Clesa, which together lost 434 million euros.

In 2012 the founding father José María Ruiz-Mateos was arrested and has again spent time in prison on remand. He is essentially accused of operating a vast pyramid scheme (paying dividends to shareholders from fresh investments). Two of his sons who ran hotels in Andalucia are formal suspects in the ERE trial process.

=== Naseiro case ===
The so-called Naseiro case was a corruption investigation within the People's Party shortly after the arrival of José María Aznar to the party presidency in 1989. A magistrate in the Valencian Community issued an indictment against several members of the People's Party including the party treasurer Rosendo Naseiro and Angel Perales Sanchis, a representative for Valencia, for receiving illegal commissions for the direct awarding of projects and contracts.

Because of the prominence of the accused, the case was heard by the Supreme Court of Spain but shelved for lack of evidence. Nevertheless, the defendants were still strongly suspected of misconduct and expelled from the Popular Party.

=== Privatisations ===
In 1997 the People's Party government of José María Aznar announced the sale of the nation's remaining minority stake (golden shares) in the Telefónica telecommunications company and the petroleum group Repsol YPF. as well as in Endesa, Argentaria and Tabacalera, all major enterprises managed by people close to Aznar, and since been declared illegal by the European Union.

This marked the beginning of a period of privatizations which has continued vigorously under PP administrations. A contested case is the Madrid region's public health service, in which the bidders are suspected of very close ties with the governing party, and in one case, run by a former regional health minister, Manuel Lamela.

In 2012 privatized or 'externalized' health services contracted by the Madrid public health service cost the region, by some estimates, 345 million euros more than similar activities previously performed by that public sector organization itself.

=== Gürtel affair ===
Gürtel is a huge case, code-named after one of its main suspects, construction businessman Francisco Correa. His surname translates to belt in English and Gürtel in German. The case covers bribery, money laundering and tax evasion, and implicates a wide circle of powerful businessmen and top politicians (90 per cent of the whole party) in the People's Party who had gained an absolute majority in the national elections of Spain.

The affair was first uncovered by the Spanish newspaper El País, whose researchers were awarded prizes for investigative journalism. Initial investigations were conducted in Madrid, Valencia & la Costa del Sol by the notable Spanish National Court Judge Baltasar Garzón, an examining magistrate serving the Juzgado Central de Instrucción No. 5.

Although Manos Limpias was party to the initial process, but as the case focussed on wayward politicians they brought an action against Garzón for investigating Francoist atrocities, which caused delay and confusion for Gürtel as Garzón was suspended for three years pending his eventual acquittal in February 2012, whereupon he was charged and convicted of a completely different crime connected to Gürtel: that of ordering the interception of communications between powerful construction company directors accused of bribing high officials and their lawyers, who were suspected of money laundering. His suspension is pending appeal at the European Court of Human Rights which has previously annulled a similar conviction On 1 June, Prime Minister Rajoy was ousted by a vote of no confidence after the verdict of the court.

==== Francisco Camps (PP party former) ====
A part of Gürtel detached in 2009, known as the case of Francisco's suits (caso de los trajes), involved the president of the Valencia region Francisco Camps who allegedly accepted very expensive bespoke tailoring paid by corrupt businessmen. He was tried by a jury in early 2012, and was acquitted by a majority verdict. Similar allegations about the high-fashion handbags of the Lady Mayor of Valencia, Rita Barberá Nolla, were dismissed. Camps resigned from his presidency to fight his case, but remained a deputy to the Valencia government. Rita Barberá (PP party former) remained in office, but took a beating at the following 2015 city elections. All council members from her list, but her, have been indicted for corruption in another case. She was a senator, and under Spanish law therefore only answerable to a higher court than the one which served those indictments. On April 21, 2016, the investigating judge requested her indictment for money laundering to the Tribunal Supremo. In November she died and therefore all her pending indictments and investigations were suspended.

==== Luis Bárcenas (PP party former) ====
The Gurtel affair separated material relating to Luis Bárcenas, at the time the treasurer of the PP party. He subsequently accused his former employer of constructive dismissal Allegedly, concessions for major public infrastructure works were obtained by major construction companies in exchange for secret corporate donations amounting to naked bribery from 1990 onwards - such funds were kept or accounted for in the so-called slush fund. Barcenas then used this slush fund to pay extra salaries of between 5000 - 15,000 Euros to party leaders each month, including Spanish Prime Minister Mariano Rajoy and his deputy María Dolores de Cospedal.

Spanish law prohibits senior politicians from receiving any income from sources other than the state institutions by which they are employed for defined official duties, and severely restricts political party funding and political campaign donations.

Large deposits of money amounting to some 38 million euros were found in several foreign bank accounts operated by Barcenas or his agents, suggesting that he may have retained some bribery money for his personal gain.

El País, the national center-left newspaper, published the so-called 'Barcenas papers' outlining some of the transactions for some of the alleged financial fraud. Its center-right rival, El Mundo, later published text messages of support sent by Prime Minister Rajoy to Barcenas, indicating a considerable personal friendship and moral support between the two politicians.

On 27 June 2013, High Court Judge Pablo Ruz ordered former Popular Party (PP) treasurer Luis Bárcenas to be held in custody without bail until his eventual trial. The judge set bail at 45 million euros to cover his civil obligations, although the state prosecutor assessed these at a mere 12 million euros.

=== ERE in Andalusia ===
Employment contract severance conditions in Spain are regulated by law, and usually abbreviated to 'ERE' (expediente de regulación de empleo).

In 2001 the (PSOE) regional government of Andalusia, presided by Manuel Chaves González (later a Minister of State in the national government), gave support to a major commercial supplier of foodstuff (Mercavilla), which was considered to be both strategically important and in financial difficulty. It provided grants for severance packages and subsidised early retirement pensions as well as commissions for services related to such transactions.

In 2008, the conservative opposition alleged that payments were made irregularly, and the Civil Guard presented evidence of a slush fund as well as unjustified payments to persons who were not actually employed, and excessive commissions to trade union officials and company directors who managed the transactions.

In response, there have been several resignations, probation and bail and even Remand (detention) orders, In August 2013, Chaves resigned and handed power to his deputy in order to deal with the accusations.

On 19 March 2013, as a result of a police operation, Operación Heracles, the examining magistrate, Mrs Mercedes Alaya, ordered the arrest and detention of 20 people who had held significant positions in society.

=== Palma Arena ===
Palma Arena is a velodrome in Palma, Majorca which was allegedly constructed to an inferior specification at an exorbitant cost and with much money diverted to politically connected operators. The former president of the Baleares region, Jaume Matas (Partido Popular), received a six-year jail sentence, and other aspects of the case are still under investigation.

=== Nóos ===
The Nóos affair is a spinoff of the Palma Arena case. Instituto Nóos is a Foundation (nonprofit) also known as Strategic Studies Association Sponsorship and Patronage and Noos Institute of Applied Research. Apparently it solicited and accepted huge payments from public bodies for major sports promotional activities which were either trivial or never started. Its directors were Diego Torres Pérez and former handball star Iñaki Urdangarin, Duke of Palma the son-in-law of the Spanish King, who also ran a consultancy with his wife, the princess Cristina de Borbón y Grecia.

Powerful officials made strenuous efforts to keep the princess out of the case. In 2013 she accepted a position in Vienna, where she moved with the children of the marriage whilst her husband remained in Barcelona to answer charges.

=== Millet or Palau de la Música Catalana ===
In 2009 the director of the Palau de la Música Catalana in Barcelona, Fèlix Millet Tusell was accused of systematically raiding the coffers of this public body and confessed to embezzling 3.3 million euros. In 2012 he was placed on bail and the prosecutor sought six years of imprisonment as well as massive fines.

On 15 January 2018, a court in Barcelona ruled that the Democratic Convergence of Catalonia (CDC, now PDeCAT) had received €6.6 million in illegal commissions from building firm Ferrovial (previously Grupo Ferrovial) between 1999 and 2009, in exchange for public works contracts. The scheme used the Palau de la Música Catalana concert venue as a front for false invoicing. Twelve people were jailed and fined millions. The former CDC treasurer Daniel Osàcar was sentenced to 4 years and 5 months in prison and fined €3.7 million for influence peddling and money laundering. Fèlix Millet Tusell was jailed for just under 10 years and fined €4.1 million; his deputy, Jordi Montull, received a 7-year and 6-month sentence and was fined €2.9 million. Millet and Montull were the individuals who benefited most from the scam, as controllers of Palau’s funds.

=== Bankia ===
Bankia is a Spanish bank which merged several failing financial institutions with largely conservative political leanings. On 11 June 2012, the young political party, Union, Progress and Democracy (UPyD) filed a lawsuit against the directors of Bankia and its main subsidiary for alleged fraud, misappropriation, falsification of financial statements in connection with corporate crime, mismanagement and scheme to alter the price of assets. The Indignant Protesters (M-15) raised 15,000 euros by crowdfunding, and filed another lawsuit for false accounting and commercial fraud.

Judge Fernando Andreu agreed to hear both complaints which called 27 defendants including: Rodrigo Rato (President of Bankia, former conservative economic minister, and former head of the International Monetary Fund), José Luis Olivas (deputy director of Bankia and former conservative president of the Valencia region), Angel Acebes (director of Bankia and former secretary general of the conservative party) and Francisco Verdú (an experienced banker and consultant to the construction industry). Also called as witnesses were a former Governor of the Bank of Spain, Miguel Angel Fernández Ordóñez, the president of the National Securities Market, Julio Segura, and the main author of the Bankia audit conducted by Deloitte, Francisco Celma. The court dismissed a request to extend the complaint to four additional Bankia directors who took office after the company was listed on the stock exchange.

=== Operation Pokémon ===
In 2012, an investigation into many Spanish politicians started. The name of the operation comes from the slogan of the Japanese franchise Pokémon, "Gotta catch 'em all", and the large number of suspects in the investigation.

=== Koldo affair ===
The Koldo case is an ongoing corruption prosecution against high key socialist cadre conducted by the Spanish Supreme Court since February 2024. The case is centred around former transport minister José Luis Ábalos and his former advisor Koldo García Izaguirre. Originally, the investigation concerned illicit dealing in dysfunctional Corona-masks. Over recent years, the authorities have discovered more ramifications and suspects, such as former Balearic head of government and current president of the lower house of parliament Francina Armengol. Furthermore, there are investigations concerning the wife (Begoña Gómez) and brother of prime minister Pedro Sánchez. Various times the oppositional People's Party rallied dissent in Madrid, while right wing Vox and associated lobbies have denounced the prime minister as "the corrupt one". At the beginning of 2026, there were no indications that he had been involved in the corrupt dealings of his entourage.

=== Operation Catalonia ===
Operation Catalonia is the name of a covert police operation allegedly driven by the government of Spain which aimed to curb the Catalan independence process. The operation consisted of research and information gathering about Catalan independence politicians without judicial authorization. The operation allegedly included the creation or use of false evidence, data manipulation, irregular reports, secret agents, leaks to the press and the use of threats to obtain confidential information.

On August 30, 2016, the Parliament of Catalonia’s investigative committee announced that the Prime Minister of Spain, Mariano Rajoy, orchestrated Operation Catalonia. José Villarejo, the former Spanish National Police Commissioner, testified in court that the Spanish government targeted Banca Privada d’Andorra (BPA) as part of the operation, threatening BPA’s executives with closure if they did not hand over private and confidential financial information on pro-independence Catalan politician, Jordi Pujol. The president sent his Head of Cabinet, Jorge Moragas, and the Secretary of State for Commerce, Jaime García-Legaz, to Andorra to force the BPA owners to hand over bank statements, in violation of Andorran law.

Spanish officials instructed Villarejo to send misleading information to the U.S. Agency FinCEN that would lead to the closure of the BPA if they didn’t comply. Villarejo later confirmed Rajoy’s role in Operation Catalonia in his 2025 court testimony and on a television interview. The Spanish political party Junts has formally requested the government declassify information relating to Operation Catalonia.

=== Zapatero affair ===
The Zapatero affair (or Plus Ultra affair) is an ongoing corruption investigation regarding the alleged scheme of influence peddling, money laundering and use of shell companies linked to the airline Plus Ultra Líneas Aéreas and public aid grants during the COVID-19 pandemic. Former president José Luis Rodríguez Zapatero is being investigated for allegedly leading the scheme and using his influence to force the SEPI to authorise the bailout of Plus Ultra.

== See also ==
- Censorship in Spain
- Crime in Spain
- Corruption in Navarre
- Anti-Corruption Prosecutor's Office
- International Anti-Corruption Academy
- Group of States Against Corruption
- International Anti-Corruption Day
- ISO 37001 Anti-bribery management systems
- United Nations Convention against Corruption
- OECD Anti-Bribery Convention
- Transparency International
