= Immunity from prosecution (international law) =

Doctrine of international law

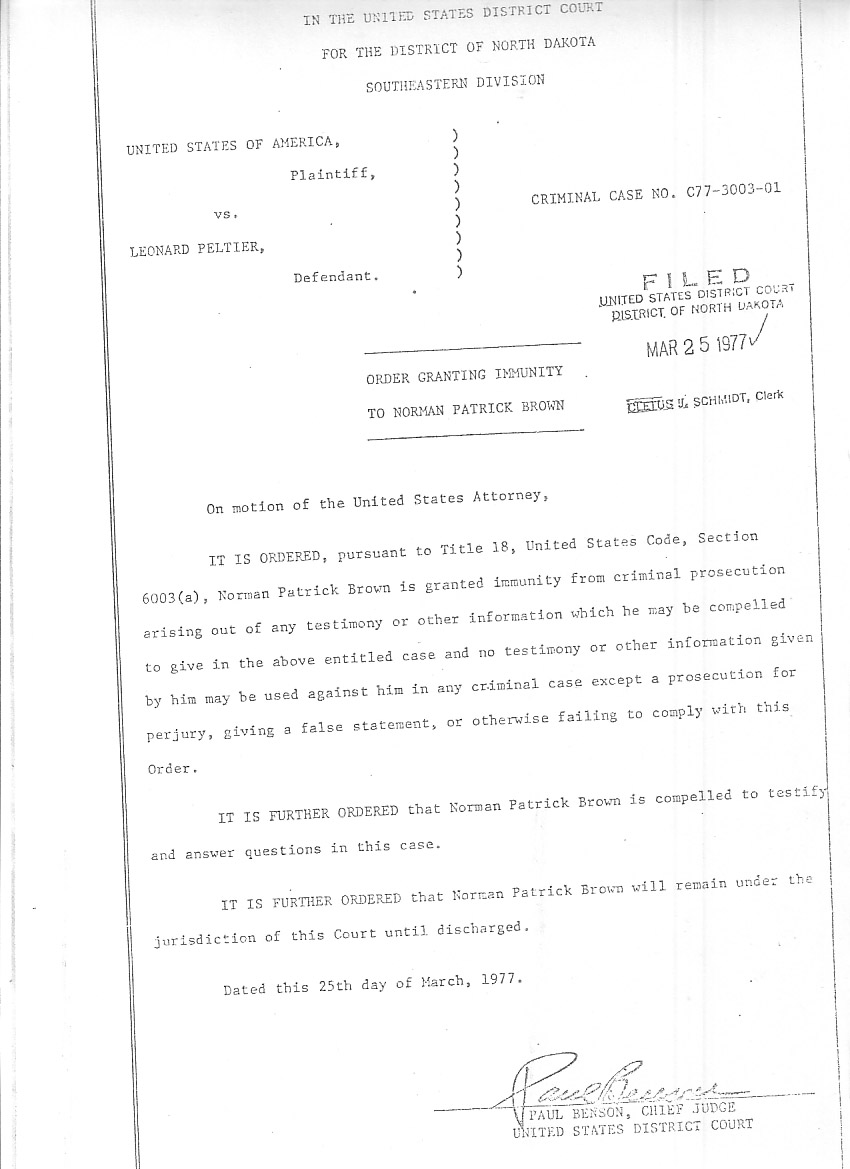
Norman Patrick Brown's immunity from prosecution order in exchange for his testimony in Leonard Peltier's criminal trial

Immunity from prosecution is a doctrine of international law that allows an accused to avoid prosecution for criminal offences. Immunities are of two types. The first is functional immunity, or immunity ratione materiae. This is an immunity granted to people who perform certain functions of the state. The second is personal immunity, or immunity ratione personae. This is an immunity granted to certain officials because of the office they hold, rather than in relation to the act they have committed.

== Functional immunity ==
Functional immunity arises from customary international law and treaty law and confers immunities on those performing acts of state (usually a foreign official). Any person who, in performing an act of state, commits a criminal offence is immune from prosecution. That is so even after the person ceases to perform acts of state. Thus, it is a type of immunity limited in the acts to which it attaches (acts of state) but ends only if the state itself ceases to exist. The immunity, though applied to the acts of individuals, is an attribute of a state, and it is based on the mutual respect of states for sovereign equality and state dignity. States thus have a significant interest in upholding the principle in international affairs: if a state's officials are to be tried at all for anything, it will be at home.

State offices usually recognised as automatically attracting immunity are the head of state or the head of government, senior cabinet members, ambassadors and the foreign and defence ministers. (Note: See the Arrest Warrant of 11 April 2000 case and R v Bow Street Metropolitan Stipendiary Magistrate, ex parte Pinochet)) Many countries have embodied the immunities in domestic law. (Note: For example, the UK's Diplomatic Privileges Act 1964 (c. 81) and State Immunity Act 1978 (c. 33))

States regularly assert that every official acting in an official capacity is immune from prosecution by foreign authorities (for non-international crimes) under the doctrine of ratione materiae. (Note: A prominent example of use of the defence is in the case taken by Italy against India under the Law of the Sea seeking to prevent the Indian government from prosecuting two Italian marines in connection with the Enrica Lexie incident, which took place outside India's territorial waters but within its EEZ that resulted in the death of two Indian fishermen.) Such officers are immune from prosecution for everything they do during their time in office. For example, an English court held that a warrant could not be issued for the arrest of Robert Mugabe on charges of international crimes on the basis that he was serving as head of state at the time that the proceedings were brought. Other examples are the attempts to prosecute Fidel Castro in Spain and Jiang Zemin in the United States.

However, once the accused leaves office, they become subject to prosecution for crimes committed before or after their term in office, or for crimes committed in a personal capacity whilst in office (subject to jurisdictional requirements and local law).

It may be the case that functional immunity is itself being eroded. Recent developments in international law suggest that ratione materiae may remain available as a defence to prosecution for local or domestic crimes or civil liability, but it is not a defence to an international crime. (International crimes include crimes against humanity, war crimes, and genocide.)

The indictment in 1998 in Spain (and subsequent arrest in the UK) of Chile's ex-president Augusto Pinochet was a landmark decision by European judges and the UK's House of Lords, which set aside functional as well as local immunities, (Note: States may find ways around domestic immunity if they want to. In Chile, the junta had passed an immunity law during Pinochet's term in office. On his return to Chile in 2000 (he was released from the UK on health grounds), he was indicted there as co-author of the crimes of aggravated abduction and of first-degree murder. After unsuccessful appeals which reached the Supreme Court, his asserted functional immunity under the amnesty law of 1978, either as head of state or as a parliamentarian, was lifted and the indictment proceeded. Shortly after his return from the UK, the Constitution of Chile was amended to include an immunity clause (and pension) for the newly-created category of "ex-presidents", on condition they resigned their position as senator-for-life. Pinochet was granted immunity on the initial charges on the grounds of diminished mental capacity, a ruling that was overturned in 2004 when evidence to the contrary (a television interview with a Miami station) was presented to the court, and he was placed under house arrest pending trial. Pinochet never faced trial in court for his alleged crimes because of various health conditions. However, after 2004, his immunity was challenged and removed in most indictments against him. At the time of his death, under house arrest, in 2006, in addition to the existing indictments, for fiscal crimes as well as crimes of violence, he was facing at least 177 criminal complaints concerning allegations of human rights offenses.) by ruling that the crimes Pinochet was accused of fell within the scope of the United Nations Convention against Torture, being international crimes so heinous that they are:

- subject to universal jurisdiction (i.e. he could validly be indicted in Spain, held in custody in the UK on foot of an international arrest warrant and then extradited to Spain for trial, for acts that were committed mainly in Chile on the nationals of several countries);
- absolutely prohibited (there can be no exceptions whatever to the prohibitions); and
- responsibility cannot be derogated (no excuses whatsoever or immunity under any circumstances).

The principle of depriving immunity for international crimes was developed further in the jurisprudence of the International Criminal Tribunal for the Former Yugoslavia, particularly in the Karadzic, Milosevic, and Furundzija cases (but care should be taken when considering ICTY jurisprudence due to its ad-hoc nature). This was also the agreed position as between the parties in their pleadings in the International Court of Justice case concerning the arrest warrant of 11 April 2000 (Democratic Republic of the Congo v. Belgium).

In 2004, the Appeals Chamber of the Special Court for Sierra Leone held that indicted Liberian president Charles Taylor could not invoke his head of state immunity to resist the charges against him, even though he was an incumbent head of state at the time of his indictment. However, this reasoning was based on the construction of the court's constituent statute, which addressed the issue of indicting state officials. In any case, Taylor had ceased to be an incumbent head of state by the time of the court's decision, so the arresting authorities would have been free to issue a fresh warrant had the initial warrant been overturned. Nevertheless, this decision may signal a changing direction in international law on this issue.

The decisions of the Spanish and UK courts regarding Pinochet were based directly on existing domestic law, which had been enacted to embody the obligations of the treaty. Although a state party to the treaty, Chile itself had not enacted such laws, which define the specified international crimes as crimes falling within the domestic criminal code and making them subject to universal jurisdiction, and thus Chile could only prosecute based on its existing criminal code – murder, abduction, assault, etc., but not genocide or torture.

The reasons commonly given for why this immunity is not available as a defence to international crimes are straightforward:

1. that genocide, war crimes and crimes against humanity are not acts of state. Criminal acts of the type in question are committed by human actors, not states; and
2. we cannot allow the jus cogens nature of international crimes, i.e., the fact that they are non-derogable norms, to be eroded by immunities.

The final judgment of the ICJ regarding immunity may have cast doubt on the existence of such a rule limiting functional immunities. See in this respect the criticism of the ICJ's approach by Wouters, Cassese and Wirth, among others, though some, such as Bassiouni, claim that the ICJ affirmed the existence of the rule.

Regarding claims based on the idea that a senior state official committing International crimes can never be said to be acting officially, as Wouters notes: "This argument, however, is not waterproof since it ignores the sad reality that in most cases those crimes are precisely committed by or with the support of high-ranking officials as part of a state's policy, and thus can fall within the scope of official acts." Academic opinion on the matter is divided and indeed only the future development of International Customary law, possibly accelerated by states exercising universal jurisdiction over retired senior state officials, will be able to confirm whether state sovereignty has now yielded partially to internationally held human rights values.

In November 2007, French prosecutors refused to press charges against former US Secretary of Defense Donald Rumsfeld for torture and other alleged crimes committed during the course of the US invasion of Iraq, on the grounds that heads of state, heads of government and foreign ministers all enjoyed official immunity under customary international law, and they further claimed that the immunity exists after the official has left office. However, other jurists hold that heads of state and state officials still can be prosecuted by foreign courts after the end of their terms of office.

== Personal immunity ==
Personal immunity arises from customary international law and confers immunity on people holding a particular office from civil, criminal, and administrative jurisdiction. It is extended to diplomatic agents and their families posted abroad and is also valid for their transfer to or from that post, only for the country to which they are posted. Under personal immunity, private residence, papers, correspondence, and property of an official enjoying personal immunity are inviolable.

According to Cassese (2005), personal immunity extends to cover personal activities of an official, including immunity from arrest and detention (but the host state may declare the person persona non grata), immunity from criminal jurisdiction, and immunity from the civil and administrative jurisdiction of the host state. No immunity holds for private immovable property unless it is held on behalf of the sending state for the purposes of the mission, issues of succession, professional or commercial activity exercised outside official functions, or the official has voluntarily submitted to the proceedings. Personal immunities cease with the cessation of the post.

It is not for the official's personal benefit but is based on the need for states to function effectively and thus not be deprived of their most important officials.

== Cases of overlap ==
When a person who is under personal immunity and has committed a criminal act covered also by functional immunity leaves office, the personal immunity is removed, as usual.

That is what happened in the Augusto Pinochet case before the House of Lords. Senator Pinochet was able to be extradited to face only charges not subject to functional immunity and that met the separate tests for extradition, under English law.

In 2024, the European Court of Human Rights ruled against Turkey over a house search and the arrest and detention of a United Nations judge, despite the judge's diplomatic immunity.

== Judicial Immunity in International Law ==
Judicial immunity, understood differently from the traditional sense in the international law context, refers to the (de facto & de jure) protection given to judges and judicial officers from being sued or prosecuted for actions they have performed as part of their role as a judge adjudicating international disputes. This principle ensures that judicial independence is not compromised and the integrity of judicial decisions is protected. In an international legal sense, it applies to judges of international courts, tribunals and other judicial organs, like the International Court of Justice (ICJ), International Criminal Court (ICC) and tribunals of like nature, such as the International Residual Mechanism for Criminal Tribunals (IRMCT). This immunity protects these judges from legal action in other jurisdictions while carrying out their functions in an official capacity.

The matter of Aydın Sefa Akay v. Türkiye (application no. 59/17), which relates to Aydın Sefa Akay (b. 1950), who served from 1987 as legal advisor to Turkey's Ministry of Foreign Affairs and represented Turkey before the European Court of Human Rights (ECHR). In 2011, he was appointed by the UN General Assembly as a judicial officer of the IRMCT, created by UN Security Council Resolution 1966 (2010) to complete the work of the ICTY and ICTR. The case pertains to a 2024 judgment of the European Court in which the Court, for the first time, recognised that an international judge enjoys full personal "judicial immunity" and held that any arrest, detention or search conducted without timely immunity review would violate Articles 5 and 8 of the ECHR. The case arose when, in September 2016, Judge Aydin Sefa Akay (hereinafter Judge Akay), a Turkish national serving remotely on the United Nations' IRMCT, was allegedly searched while further detained following Turkey's failed attempted coup. In pursuance of the same, on 15 July 2016, Turkish authorities detained over 80,000 individuals with suspected links to the Fethullah Gülen movement. In a series of arrests and detentions, Akay was arrested on 21 September 2016, in Istanbul, on suspicion of being a member of an armed terrorist organisation further placing him in pre‑trial detention.

Judge Akay claimed "Judicial" and "Diplomatic" Immunity, and deciding on the case merits, the ECHR, in its judgement, found Turkey in breach of Article 5 §1 for detaining the Judge without conducting an immunity assessment which he had by virtue of judicial capacity vis-a-vis IRMCT. The court further held Turkey accountable under Article 8 of ECHR for searching his home without waiver or legal basis, and awarded €21,100 for non‑monetary damage, with any tax that may be charged. Additionally, the court awarded €7,000 for costs and expenses for seventy hours of his legal work at a rate of €100 per hour for the time that Judge Akay spent on various legal tasks connected with this case.

== Immunity before the International Criminal Court ==
The Rome Statute established the International Criminal Court (ICC) in 2002 and deviated from the functional and personal immunities by expressly excluding official capacity of an individual as a defence. Article 27 of the Statute states that it "shall apply equally to all persons without any distinction based on official capacity," and that immunities attaching to a person's official position, whether arising under national or international law, "shall not bar the Court from exercising its jurisdiction over such a person".

This waiver of immunity is straightforward for those nationals of States which have ratified the Rome Statute, which are treated as having waived such immunities by treaty. Its application to nationals of non-party States has been the subject of debate, and intersects with Article 98, which prevents the Court from requesting a state's cooperation where doing so would require that state to act inconsistently with obligations it owes to a third state under international law.

=== Prosecutor v. Omar Hassan Ahmad Al-Bashir ===
The ICC issued its first arrest warrant for a sitting head of state on 4 March 2009, when Pre-Trial Chamber I found reasonable grounds to believe that the then Sudanese President Omar al-Bashir bore criminal responsibility for war crimes and crimes against humanity. Sudan was not a party to the Rome Statute, and the Court's jurisdiction rested instead on a 2005 United Nations Security Council referral of the Darfur situation.

Al-Bashir subsequently travelled to several states parties without being arrested, prompting a series of non-compliance findings. In April 2014, Pre-Trial Chamber I found that the Democratic Republic of the Congo had failed to comply with its obligation to arrest and surrender Al-Bashir during a 2014 visit. In July 2017, the Pre-Trial Chamber also delivered a finding of non-compliance against South Africa, following his attendance at an African Union summit in Johannesburg.

The Court's position was consolidated in its 6 May 2019 judgment concerning Jordan, which had failed to arrest Al-Bashir during a March 2017 Arab League summit in Amman. The Appeals Chamber held that Article 27(2) reflects customary international law in excluding reliance on head-of-state immunity in relation to arrest and surrender requests made by an international court exercising its own proper jurisdiction. At the same time, the Chamber found that Pre-Trial Chamber II had erred in referring Jordan's non-compliance to the Assembly of States Parties and the UN Security Council, and reversed that part of the decision.

=== Situation in Ukraine ===
On 17 March 2023, Pre-Trial Chamber II issued arrest warrants for Russian President Vladimir Putin and Presidential Commissioner for Children's Rights Maria Lvova-Belova, finding reasonable grounds to believe they bore criminal responsibility for the unlawful deportation and transfer of children from occupied areas of Ukraine to Russia. Russia is not a party to the Rome Statute; the Court's jurisdiction over the situation rested on a declaration by Ukraine accepting ICC jurisdiction, rather than a Security Council referral as in the Al-Bashir case.

On 3 September 2024, Putin visited Mongolia, a state party to the Rome Statute, without being arrested. On 24 October 2024, Pre-Trial Chamber II found that Mongolia had failed to comply with the Court's request to arrest and surrender Putin, contrary to the Rome Statute, and referred the matter to the Assembly of States Parties under Article 87(7). The Chamber maintained in its non-compliance ruling that no waiver of immunity by the state concerned is required and personal immunity, including that of heads of state, is not applicable before the Court. Mongolia subsequently sought leave to appeal the finding, arguing that its consultation with the Court under Article 97 of the Statute had satisfied its cooperation obligations; the Chamber did not accept this argument.

The Court's position was tested again in November 2024, when Pre-Trial Chamber I issued arrest warrants for Israeli prime minister Benjamin Netanyahu and former defence minister Yoav Gallant, both nationals of Israels (not party to the Rome Statute), for alleged war crimes and crimes against humanity connected with the war in Gaza. In February 2025, the United States–also not a party to the Rome Statute–responded by issuing Executive Order 14203, which imposed sanctions on the then ICC Chief Prosecutor Karim Ahmad Khan and reserved authority to sanction others assisting the Court's investigation of United States nationals or those of its allies.

By contrast, the arrest and surrender of former Philippine president Rodrigo Duterte in March 2025 shows that a state may still choose to enforce the Court's warrants against its own former head of state. The Philippines had withdrawn from the ICC in 2019, but the Court could still exercise jurisdiction over conduct alleged to have occurred while the country was still a state party.

Commentators remain divided on whether Article 27 has, in practice, displaced customary head-of-state immunity outside cases referred by the United Nations Security Council, or whether enforcement continues to depend largely on individual states' political willingness to arrest wanted officials.

== Relevant Conventions and Treaties ==
=== IRMCT Statute and UN Convention ===
The assessment of Judge Akay's judicial immunity and the related Convention rights rests primarily on three pillars: (i) the IRMCT Statute (together with the 1946 UN Convention on Privileges and Immunities), (ii) the Vienna Convention on Diplomatic Relations, and (iii) the ECtHR's own judgements under Articles 5 and 8 of the European Convention on Human Rights.

Under Article 29(1) of the IRMCT Statute, "the Convention on the Privileges and Immunities of the United Nations of 13 February 1946 shall apply to the Mechanism ... and to the judges." Article 29(2) goes on to provide that IRMCT judges "shall enjoy the same privileges and immunities... accorded to the President, the Prosecutor and the Registrar when engaged on the business of the Mechanism." These privileges, set out in Article V and further subdivided into Sections 17–21 of the 1946 Convention, are similar to those available to diplomatic agents, conferring full protection from arrest, detention or legal process with respect to both official and private acts during their term of office. Convention on the Privileges and Immunities of the United Nations

=== Vienna Convention on Diplomatic Relations ===
Article 38 of the Vienna Convention on Diplomatic Relations ("VCDR") distinguishes immunity ratione personae (full personal immunity) from immunity ratione materiae (functional immunity) and limits the latter for agents of a diplomatic nature who are nationals or permanent residents of the receiving State by providing "...a national of or permanently resident in that State shall enjoy only immunity from jurisdiction, and inviolability, in respect of official acts performed in the exercise of his functions."

Article 38 of this Convention also restricts nationals or permanent residents of the receiving State to functional immunity only, subject to the requirement that the receiving State must exercise jurisdiction "in such a manner as not to interfere unduly with the performance of the functions of the mission". Although IRMCT judges are not, strictly speaking, diplomatic envoys under the Vienna Convention, the Mechanism Statute deliberately imports this diplomatic model to define their immunities, which shows that the narrower approach of Article 38 does not apply to them.

=== Provisions for Immunity under ECHR ===
Firstly, for any deprivation to even occur, the Court requires the deprivation of personal liberty to be "in accordance with a procedure prescribed by law" (Article 5 §1).

Secondly, Article 8 mandates that any interference with an individual's home or private life be "in accordance with the law" and accompanied by effective safeguards against abuse, including respect for inviolability rights derived from diplomatic or analogous immunities. While the Court has previously addressed diplomatic and consular immunities (for example, in the case of Al‑Adsani v. the United Kingdom), Aydın Sefa Akay v. Türkiye represents its first decision framing the immunity of an international judge as a Convention‑protected right.

== Significance of Akay Judgement ==
The judgment integrates international judicial immunities into human‑rights jurisprudence and shows the necessity of prompt immunity review. Some scholars argue that Turkey's non‑compliance and Akay's non‑reappointment signal risks to judicial independence, while others call for clearer waiver mechanisms.

== See also ==
- Amnesty law
- Command responsibility
- Diplomatic immunity
- Extradition
- International law
- International Criminal Court
- Jurisdiction
- State immunity
- International Residual Mechanism for Criminal Tribunals
- Diplomatic Immunity
- European Convention on Human Rights
