= Ana Garrido Ramos =

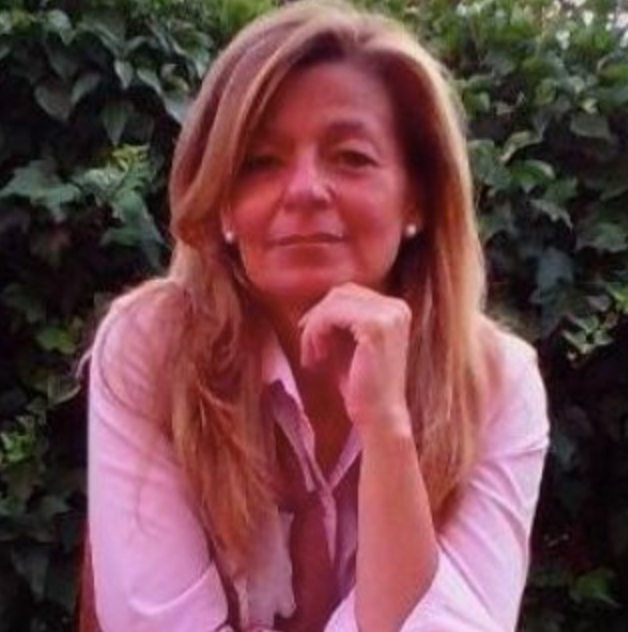
Ana Garrido Ramos

Ana María Garrido Ramos (born c. 1966) is a former local government employee of Boadilla del Monte town council in the Madrid metropolitan area. She is a key witness and whistleblower in the Gürtel case, an ongoing political corruption scandal in Spain.

In 1993, Garrido Ramos started employment with the Ayuntamiento de Boadilla, working in the youth section. She became its head in 2007. In March 2008, Mayor Arturo González Panero chose to stand down after a period of illness and went to stay in Costa Rica. González Panero was later named in the Panama Papers.

An internal company document suggested that he acted beyond his remit both geographically and in political and business dealings. Even though Garrido Ramos had knowledge of the entire contents of the document, she decided not to blow the whistle, fearing reprisals, and continued to work for the Ayuntamiento de Boadilla.

Somehow the anti-corruption organisation Manos Limpias ("Clean Hands") received the document, which it submitted to the Anti-Corruption Prosecutor's Office, which prompted them to start investigations into what was to become the Gürtel case. The 2011 indictment by examining magistrate Baltasar Garzón precipitated González Panero's resignation as mayor. In 2011 elections a new mayor, Antonio González Terol, took charge. González Panero returned to his managerial post as leader of the Youth Section until, in 2013, he was accused of workplace harassment.

Garrido Ramos developed clinical depression due to her treatment at work. In 2014, the employment tribunal of Móstoles, Madrid subpoenaed Garrido da por probada la situación de acoso laboral sufrida por Ana María Garrido Ramos ("To give evidence in the case of workplace harassment suffered by Ana María Garrido Ramos"), whereon the Ayuntamiento de Boadilla terminated her employment with an out-of-court settlement of €96,000 for "daños morales" ("moral damages"). Due to an appeal by Boadilla town hall, she has not received the sum as of September 2016.

Garrido Ramos has advocated a law to improve whistleblower protection (Protección al Denunciante de Corrupción). Her case has been closed. As of May 2016, she had sold most of her clothes and furniture, rented out her home, and was selling handmade bracelets for a living.

In 2016, she was nominated for the "Encina de Oro" Award.
