= Lapuerta =

Lapuerta is a Spanish surname. Notable people with the surname include:

- Álvaro Lapuerta (1927–2018), Spanish politician
- Rosario Silva de Lapuerta (born 1954), Spanish jurist and judge
