= Moix =

Moix is a surname. Notable people with the surname include:

- Ana María Moix (1947–2017), Spanish poet and novelist
- Manuel Moix, Spain's top anti-corruption prosecutor, February-June 2017
- Terenci Moix (1942–2003), Spanish novelist
- Yann Moix (born 1968), French novelist and film director
