= Gürtel affair =

Political corruption scandal in Spain

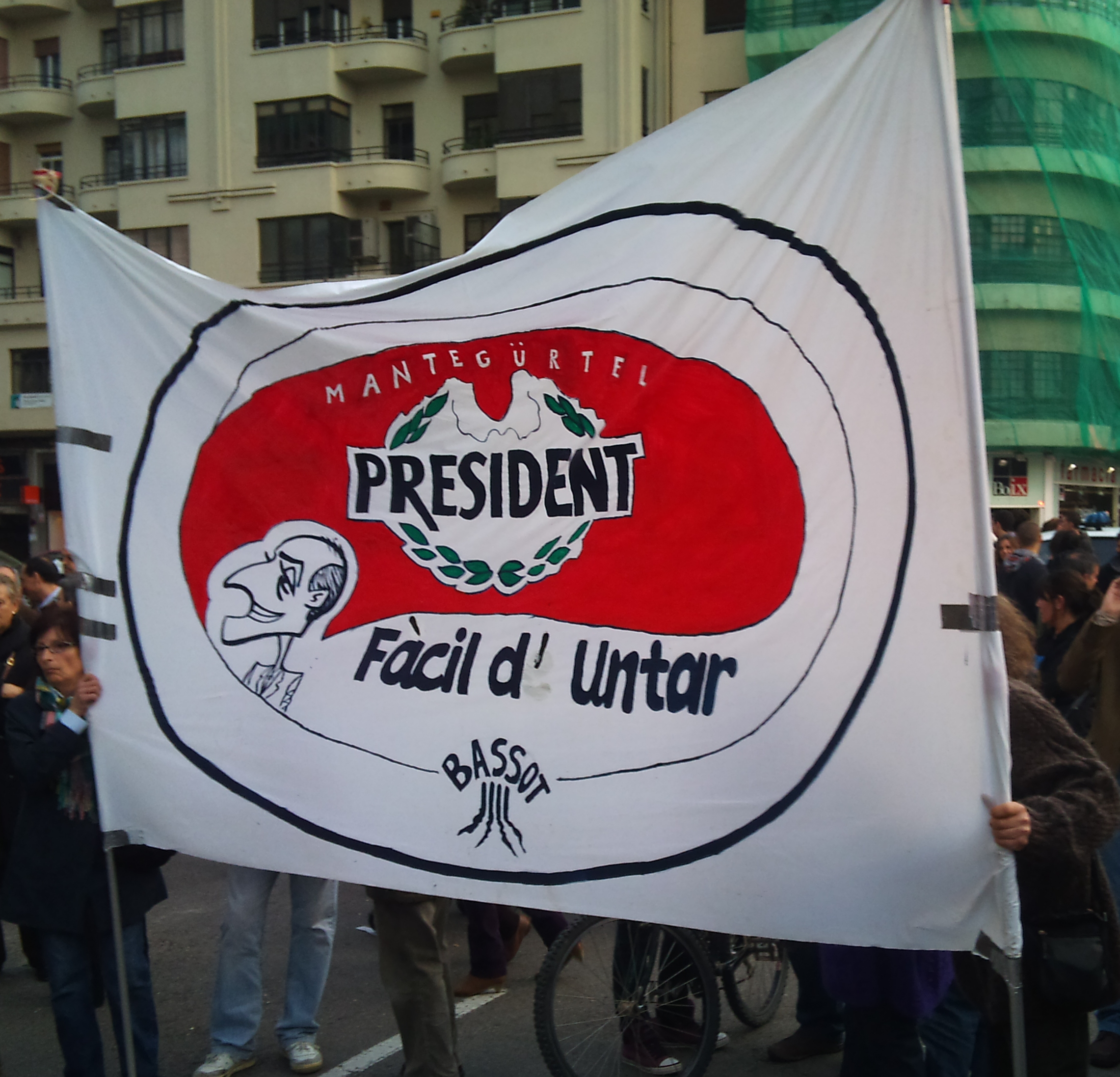
Satirical banner (in Catalan) at a rally, parodying the President brand of cheese spread with the tagline a president easy to spread (bribe).

The Gürtel affair is a major political corruption investigation in Spain involving a network of businesspeople and hundreds of officers of the People's Party (PP), Spain's major conservative party, some of whom were subsequently forced to resign or were suspended. The investigation revealed a network of businesspeople and politicians who allegedly exchanged public procurement contracts and other favors for illicit payments, and illegal party funding in regions such as the Community of Madrid and the Valencian Community. It was launched by the Anti-Corruption Prosecutor's Office in 2007 and brought before the Audiencia Nacional in 2009, after police inquiries into alleged illicit party funding and rigged public procurement contracts.

Gürtel is one of the largest corruption scandals in recent European history and was linked to related scandals, such as the Bárcenas case, which received media attention in their own right. The case came to public attention in early 2009, but for the most part, the suspects were not put on trial until October 2016.

The investigative operation was given the name Gürtel in a cryptic reference to one of the principal suspects, Francisco Correa Sánchez (correa, in Spanish, meaning 'belt' in English, translates to Gürtel in German). Correa was a businessman who cultivated links with PP officers. The Spanish police began to investigate his activities in 2007, after a whistle-blower, Ana Garrido Ramos, provided information regarding alleged corruption in the Madrid region.

The accusations included bribery, money laundering, and tax evasion. They implicated a circle of business people led by Correa and politicians from the People's Party, although some of the evidence referred to participants by initials and nicknames, such as "Luis el Cabron". The alleged illicit activities related to party funding and the awarding of contracts by local/regional governments in Valencia, the Community of Madrid, and elsewhere. Early estimates of the loss to public finances amounted to at least €120,000,000, while some of the alleged bribes paid in return were not particularly large (for example, items of luxury clothing).

On 24 May 2018, the Audiencia Nacional, Spain's highest criminal court, found dozens of people, as well as the ruling People's Party, guilty of fraud, money laundering, and illegal kickbacks. It delivered the first major judgment in the case, sentencing Correa and other defendants to long prison terms and finding that the PP had benefited financially from the corruption scheme since the late 1980s. The ruling, largely upheld by the Supreme Court in 2020, contributed to a vote of no confidence in June 2018 that removed Prime Minister Mariano Rajoy from office.

== Judicial process ==
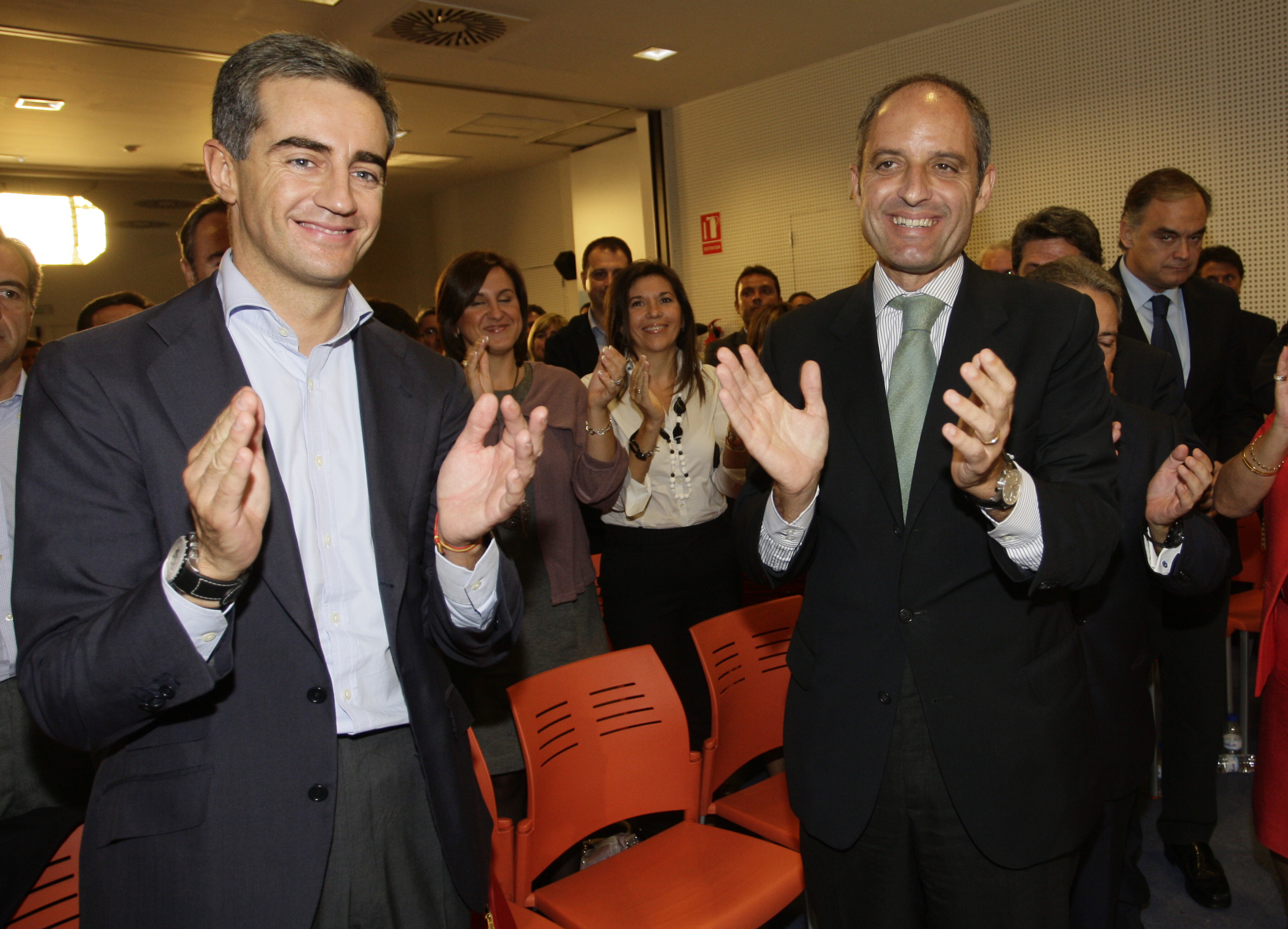
Francisco Camps and Ricardo Costa

A judicial investigation was started by Baltasar Garzón, the examining magistrate of the Juzgado Central de Instrucción No. 5 at the Audiencia Nacional, the court which investigates the most important criminal cases in Spain, including terrorism, organised crime, and money laundering. Garzón had five suspects, including Correa, detained in February 2009.

Garzón was suspended as a judge in 2010, pending his own trial on a charge of exceeding his authority with regard to a case unrelated to Gürtel. The suspension was eventually overturned, but it was still in force when, in 2011, Garzón was given another suspension, this time pending trial for having violated lawyer-client privilege in the Gürtel case (he had recorded conversations between detained suspects and their lawyers). The case was reassigned to Judge Antonio Pedreira Andrade.

In 2011, Pedreira set bail for Correa at €15,000,000, reportedly the second-largest figure in Spanish legal history. Correa's legal team appealed, arguing that the amount was not based on an objective assessment of their client's wealth, as Correa's access to some accounts had been blocked, and there was uncertainty about how much wealth he held abroad. Correa was released on bail in June 2012, by which time Pedreira had been replaced by the third judge to handle the case, Pablo Ruz. Ruz reduced the sum required to 200,000 euros, a reduction reflecting not only the accused's perceived ability to pay but also the length of time he had been held on remand, which was approaching the maximum possible under Spanish law.

=== Division into proceedings ===
The investigation took a long time for various reasons, including the number of suspects and delays in receiving information from foreign banks. In 2014, Judge Ruz concluded part of the investigation and divided the case into separate proceedings. One of these, known as Época I, concerned alleged offences committed between 1999 and 2005.

Ruz was removed from the case before the first major trial began in 2016. The Época I proceedings examined activities connected to Correa's network in Estepona; the Madrid municipalities of Majadahonda and Pozuelo de Alarcón; and the Autonomous Community of Castilla and León.

=== Valencian proceedings ===
A case involving the Valencian branch of the alleged network went to court relatively quickly. It was known in the press as the "suitgate" affair, as it involved allegations of suits supposedly given to prominent Valencian politician Francisco Camps. After a partial dismissal in 2009, the Supreme Court of Spain ordered the case to be reopened.

In 2011, Camps resigned as Valencian president and leader of the Valencian Partido Popular before the trial. In 2012, he was acquitted by a jury of bribery-related charges; the acquittal was subsequently upheld on appeal.

Other proceedings concerning alleged irregular financing of the Valencian Partido Popular were dealt with separately. In January 2018, former Valencian PP secretary-general Ricardo Costa admitted in court that his party financed election campaigns via "funds not declared through official party accounts".

=== Época I trial and judgment ===
The trial in the Época I proceedings began in 2016. On 24 May 2018, several Spanish politicians and business people, including Correa, his lieutenant Pablo Crespo, and former Spanish treasurer Luis Bárcenas, were convicted in the Gürtel case. The judgment concerned conduct between 1999 and 2005, with some specific later activities, and it imposed a total of 165 penalties. Correa was sentenced to 51 years in prison, while Crespo was jailed for 37 years and six months. Bárcenas, a close ally of the Spanish prime minister and pp treasurer Mariano Rajoy, received a 33-year sentence and a fine of €44m. Bárcenas's wife, Rosalía Iglesias, was jailed for 15 years, and Correa's ex-wife, Carmen Rodríguez Quijano, for 14 years and eight months.

The court found that the Correa network and members of the People's Party had maintained a stable relationship involving services such as travel and event organisation as well as irregularities in public procurement. It held that companies linked to Correa had received favourable treatment in certain public contracts and that the resulting scheme involved illicit commissions, gifts, and other benefits. It was also decreed that the People's Party had taken part in the kickback scheme since 1989. Of the 37 individuals charged, 29 were convicted, while 8 were acquitted.

The judgment held the PP liable as a beneficiary on a for-profit basis for electoral events in Majadahonda and Pozuelo de Alarcón. This was a civil-liability finding requiring restitution of the benefit obtained; it was not a criminal conviction of the party.

Following this, on 1 June, Prime Minister Rajoy was ousted by a vote of no confidence.

=== Supreme Court ruling ===
In October 2020, the Supreme Court largely upheld the 2018 judgment. It confirmed the convictions of 29 defendants and the PP civil liability as a beneficiary on a for-profit basis, while modifying some individual convictions and sentences.

== Media coverage ==
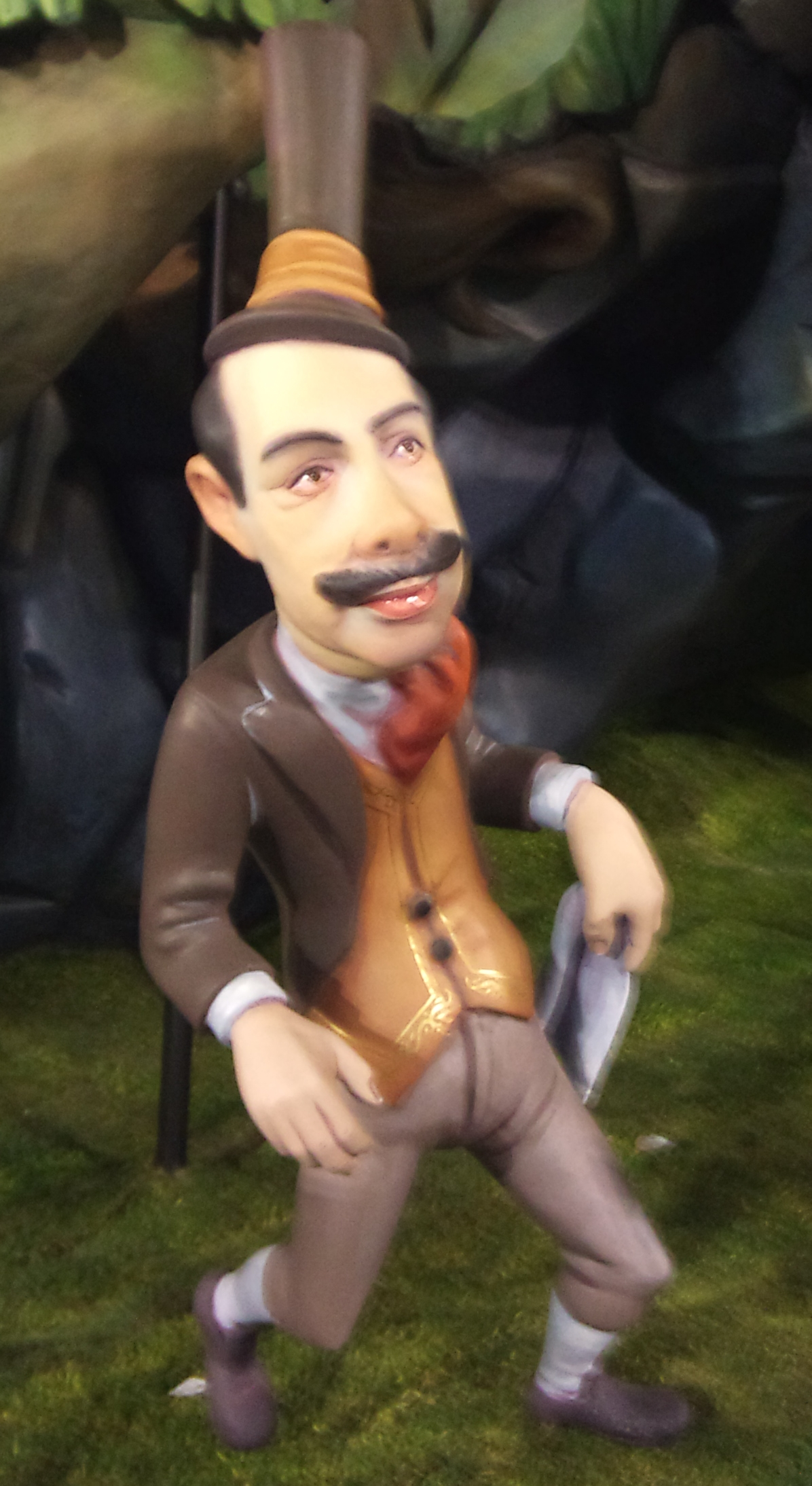
Caricature of Álvaro Pérez, known as El Bigotes (the mustache). He was one of the people convicted in relation to activities in Valencia.

Prior to 2013, reactions to Gürtel often divided along party political lines, with more conservative media downplaying the significance of the allegations. Spain's highest-circulation daily newspaper, centre-left El País, which traditionally supports the PSOE, won a major press award (an Ortega y Gasset) in 2010 for investigative journalism relating to Gürtel. Público, a newspaper with a more left-wing stance than El País, also gave much coverage to the case.

In 2013, the picture became more complicated, as the Barcenas case started dividing the electorate of the People's Party. While the conservative ABC kept toeing the party line, the centre-right El Mundo carried some of the major revelations about the case.

== Corruption and transparency in Spain ==
It has been argued that the underlying problem is not a party political one but rather a system that does not require transparency in the awarding of contracts. Spain occupied the fortieth place in Transparency International's Corruption Perceptions Index of 2013 (having dropped from thirtieth place). In 2016, Spain's first anti-corruption commission began work.

== Bárcenas papers ==
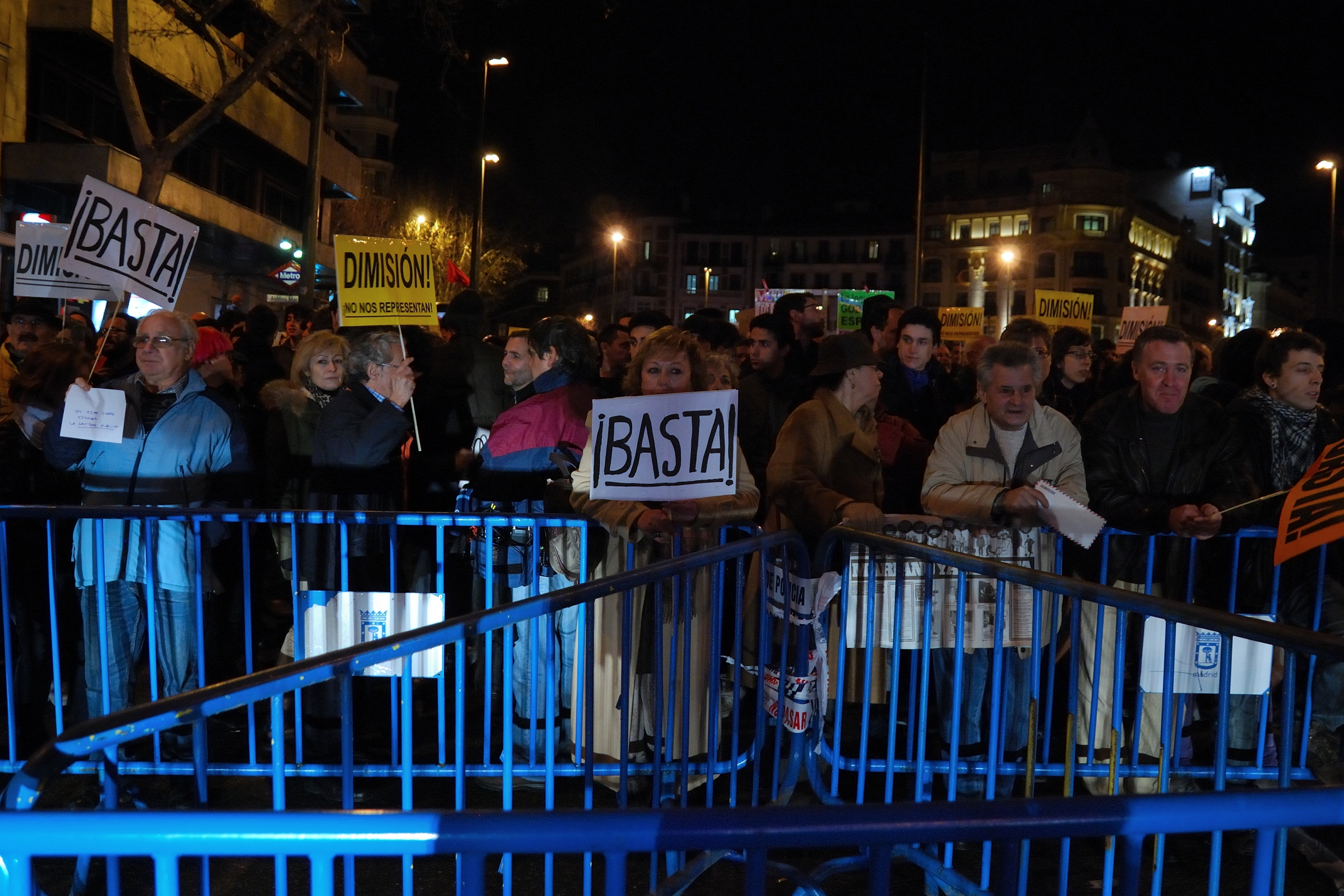
Demonstration in front of the People's Party headquarters protesting against the Barcenas affair (2 February 2013).

January 2013 saw major revelations regarding the activities of Luis Bárcenas, the former treasurer of the Partido Popular. The Spanish justice system released information from Swiss authorities regarding his financial dealings in Switzerland, and the press reported on alleged slush funds run for the benefit of the Partido Popular. The allegations of illegal party funding came initially from El Mundo, Spain's leading centre-right newspaper, which is normally close to the Partido Popular. It alleged that secret donations had been used for under-the-table payments ("backhanders") to party officials. Citing sources within the Partido Popular, the newspaper appeared to clear its current leadership, saying that the reported payments were made between 1989 and 2009.

On 31 January, El País published facsimiles of handwritten accounts, allegedly from Barcenas' hand and detailing slush funds, which report a total of 250,000 euros illegally paid to former prime minister Mariano Rajoy. The alleged funds came mostly from private building construction companies, like FCC and OHL. This, if the allegations are confirmed, would raise additional questions around Spain's building boom. While the PP filed a defamation lawsuit against El País (which it subsequently dropped), it took no action against El Mundo. Attorney General Eduardo Torres-Dulce ordered the anti-corruption prosecutor to investigate any possible links between the alleged payments handed out to Partido Popular officials and case filings in the Gürtel case. In 2014, El País commented that it is hard to draw a clear line between the two cases—Gürtel and Barcenas. However, the cases are being processed separately by Spanish courts.
