= Kumar Lama =

Kumar Lama is a colonel in the Nepalese Army who was arrested in the United Kingdom (UK) on charges of torture in 2013 under the legal principle of universal jurisdiction. At the time, Lama was a military observer in the UN Mission in South Sudan (UNMISS). Lama was cleared of all charges in September 2016.

== UK arrest ==
In 2013, Kumar Lama was arrested by the Metropolitan Police at St. Leonard's-on-sea near Hastings over torture he was alleged to have committed during the Nepalese Civil War. He was held at his East Sussex home by Metropolitan Police officers.

Detectives with specialist experience of war crimes arrested the officer under Section 134 of the Criminal Justice Act 1988, a law that defines torture as a crime of universal jurisdiction. This means that suspects can face trial before a British court even if their alleged offences had nothing to do with the UK. He is accused of committing crimes during Nepal's civil war, in which more than 16,000 people died. However, Nepal said Britain is breaching its sovereignty by carrying out the arrest. Narayan Kaji Shrestha, the country's foreign minister, said: "The arrest of Lama, who has been serving in the United Nations mission in Sudan, without informing the concerned government and without any evidence, is against the general principle of international law and jurisdiction of a sovereign country."

The Deputy Asia-Pacific Director of Amnesty International, stated "This arrest may prove to be a welcome step towards accountability but it also really highlights the Nepal government's failure to provide justice for the thousands of victims of torture, enforced disappearance, killings and other human rights abuses in the country."

The trial took place in the Old Bailey. After many procedural problems (including bad interpreters), he was acquitted.
