= Gibril Massaquoi =

Gibril Massaquoi (born in 1970) was a commander and a spokesperson for the notorious Sierra Leone rebel group, the Revolutionary United Front (RUF), which also fought in Liberia. In 2005, he became the top informer for the prosecutor of the Special Court for Sierra Leone. He gave evidence to the UN-backed Special Court for Sierra Leone set up to investigate war crimes committed in that conflict. He was relocated to Finland in 2008 as part of a witness protection programme, which provided immunity for crimes committed in Sierra Leone, but not Liberia.

== Arrest ==
On 10 March 2020, Massaquoi was arrested in Tampere, Finland, by the Finnish police who suspect he committed war crimes and crimes against humanity in Liberia between 1999 and 2003. Massaquoi's was regarded as unprecedented, as this was the first time that a top informer of an international tribunal was arrested and charged by a national court without the agreement of the institution with which he collaborated. The case has thus caused controversy, particularly among former members of the SCSL concerning immunity for insiders and witness protection.

== Trial and charges ==
Massaquoi's trial began on 1 February 2021, two years after the opening of an investigation into him. It was conducted in record time and is considered a revolution in universal jurisdiction, all in the midst of a pandemic. Massaquoi was charged with war crimes and crimes against humanity, including committing and inciting the murders of civilians and enemy fighters, aggravated rapes, aggravated war crimes, and aggravated violations of human rights in a State of Emergency during the Second Liberian Civil War. Massaquoi denied all charges, saying he was not in Liberia when the alleged crimes took place. Prosecutors have demanded a life sentence, which, in Finland tends to mean 14 years imprisonment. Massaquoi was acquitted of all charges.

In a historic first, the Court also travelled to Liberia and Sierra Leone in mid-February 2021 to hear testimony from up to 80 witnesses and visit sites where the atrocities were alleged to have been carried out under Massaquoi's orders. In April 2021 he was acquitted on all charges. The acquittal was appealed by prosecutors in January 2023, but was upheld by the Turku Court of Appeal in January 2024.
