= Ricardo Cavallo =

Argentine naval lieutenant commander

Ricardo Miguel Cavallo is a retired Argentine naval lieutenant commander. Under the name Miguel Angel Cavallo, he served as an officer of the National Reorganization Process (El Proceso), a military dictatorship which ruled Argentina from 1976 to 1983. On the basis of his activities in secret G-322 operations, he was later charged with kidnapping, torture, and/or murder, of hundreds of political dissidents.

He left the country after retiring from the Navy. After living for decades in Mexico, Cavallo was arrested, extradited to Spain in 2003, and indicted there under the principle of universal jurisdiction, on charges of genocide and terrorism. This was the first time that a person had been extradited from one country to another, for human rights crimes committed in a third one. After changes in Argentina, and renewal of prosecution of his case there, Cavallo was extradited in early 2008 to his homeland, tried and convicted there, in 2011, of numerous crimes, and sentenced to life in prison.

== Background ==
Ricardo Miguel Cavallo was a career naval officer at the time the military junta was established in 1976, following a coup d'etat in Argentina. He was alleged to have served the junta by participating directly in its Dirty War against political opponents, dissidents, and activists. He served with the G322 secret operations. During those years of state-directed terrorism, an estimated 15,000 people were disappeared and many others were kidnapped and interrogated under torture. After retiring from the Navy with the rank of lieutenant commander, Cavallo made his way to Mexico.

He was later accused of "kidnapping, torturing and murdering hundreds of people," and to have committed crimes against civilians during the junta's "Dirty War". He disputes these claims, and has said the allegations are a case of mistaken identity.

Cavallo was indicted in Spain in September 2000, in affirmation of the principle of universal jurisdiction, by judge Baltasar Garzon, who had been conducting ongoing investigations into human rights abuses under South American military dictatorships. Since Cavallo was living in Mexico at the time, Spain requested his extradition. A Mexican court reviewed the case and recommended in January 2001 that he be extradited, and Foreign Secretary, Jorge G. Castañeda agreed, marking a significant change in Mexico's extradition policy. Cavallo appealed the decision, which led to a lengthy series of court cases. In June 2003 the Supreme Court of Mexico ruled that he could be extradited on charges of genocide and terrorism, but not on charges of torture, for which a lower court had ruled the statute of limitations had expired.

He was extradited later that month, marking the first time that a country had extradited an individual to another country for human rights crimes allegedly committed in a third. As Cavallo awaited trial in Spain, Argentina in 2003 repealed, and in 2005 its Supreme Court declared unconstitutional, the Ley de Punto Final and Ley de Obediencia Debida, two laws of 1985-1986 that had previously given immunity to individuals alleged to have committed crimes during the "Dirty War". As a result, the National Court of Spain in December 2006 declared that since Cavallo could be tried in Argentine courts, which had priority, the Spanish courts lacked jurisdiction.

Cavallo was briefly released from jail when an extradition request from Argentina failed to arrive within the required 40 days, but was rearrested a day later after a request was faxed. The Spanish Supreme Court reversed the lower court decision in July 2007, ruling that Cavallo should stand trial in Madrid, because the case against him in Spanish courts was more advanced than that in Argentina.

In February 2008 the Spanish government granted Argentina's extradition request, and Cavallo was sent back to Argentina the next month. He was convicted at trial; the verdict was upheld through appeals, and he was sentenced to life imprisonment by the Argentine Supreme Court on October 26, 2011.

In 1985, France awarded him the Ordre national du Mérite, a French order of merit, not knowing his role in tortures and killing. This distinction was withdrawn in 2020.
