= Luis Bárcenas =

Spanish politician (born 1957)

Spanish Senator for Cantabria
- In office 14 March 2004 – 19 April 2010

Personal details
- Born: José Luis Bárcenas Gutíerrez; 22 October 1957 (age 68) Huelva, Spain
- Party: Partido Popular
- Spouse: Rosalía Iglesias Villar
- Children: Guillermo Bárcenas
- Profession: Businessman

José Luis Bárcenas Gutiérrez (born 22 October 1957) is a Spanish politician who served as party treasurer of Spain's Partido Popular (PP, People's Party) and a senator. Formerly a key player in his party's accounts department, since 2009 he has been embroiled in political corruption scandals. In 2018 he was sentenced to a 33 year prison term and a €44 million fine for his role in the Gürtel trial.

== Career ==
Luis Bárcenas started working in the People's Party accounts department in 1990, and he became the chief administrator of the party in 1993. In 2008, the president of the party, Mariano Rajoy, personally chose him as Treasurer to replace Álvaro Lapuerta. He pursued a parallel career as a politician, and in 2004 and 2008, he was elected to represent Cantabria in the Senate.

His time as treasurer was short, as he "temporarily" resigned in 2009 when his implication in the Gürtel affair became too much of a public embarrassment for the party. Bárcenas stepped down from the Senate in 2010, and his resignation as treasurer was made definitive. Until early 2013, he nonetheless retained access to a private office at the PP headquarters and continued to receive payments from the party equivalent to his salary, under circumstances which are disputed.

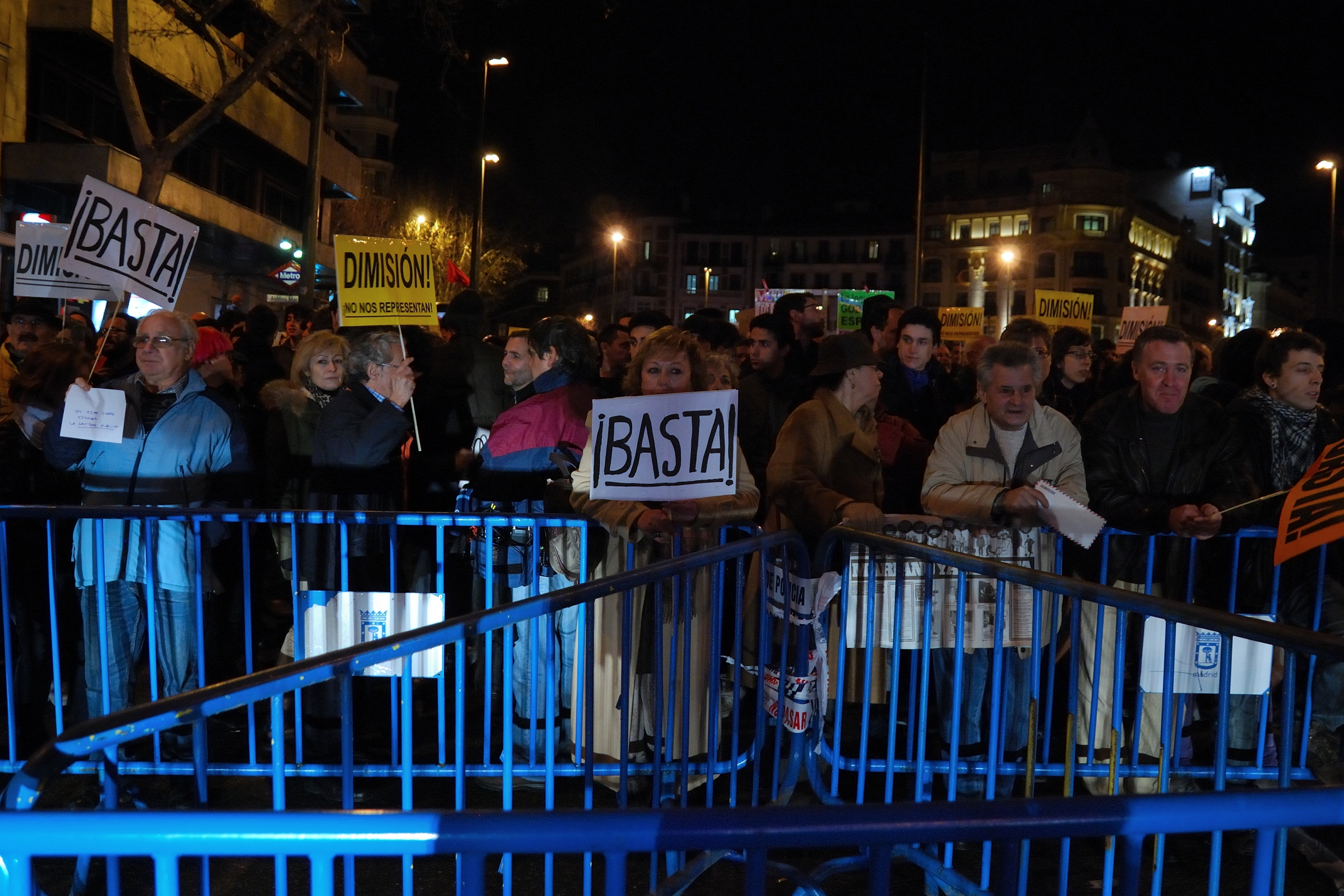
Demonstration against Bárcenas on 2 February 2013 outside the People's Party headquarters.

In 2011 the case against him was put on hold because of uncertainty regarding the identification of individuals described by initials or an alias (it had been claimed that the alias "Luis el cabrón" referred to Bárcenas). However, the case was reopened in 2012 and he was accused of "tax fraud and of receiving illegal payments". The controversy around him further flared up in January 2013, when the Swiss authorities informed the Gürtel investigation that he held a Swiss bank account that had contained €22 million. (It later emerged that he controlled significant further funds in that country). Additionally, he admitted using the 2012 tax amnesty voted by the PP to legalize €10 million hidden through a Uruguayan company.

== Bárcenas papers ==
In 2013 Spain's two main dailies, El Mundo (center-right) and El País (center-left), alleged that the PP had used unofficial parallel accounting to hide slush money from illegal donations. Two former treasurers, Bárcenas and his predecessor Lapuerta, allegedly used these illegal donations in part "to make under-the-table payments to PP leaders". The donations in question appeared to contravene party financing laws on two counts: first, for exceeding the 60,000-euro limit for any one individual or company; second, many alleged donors were involved in the construction sector and were simultaneously being awarded government contracts. However, there were indications that measures had been taken to keep donations within the letter of the law.

El País published facsimiles of handwritten "secret ledgers" (purportedly in Bárcenas' hand) suggesting that Mariano Rajoy, the Prime Minister of Spain, María Dolores de Cospedal, the Secretary-General of the People's Party, and many other high ranking PP officials, received undeclared money. Initially all implicated politicians, including Bárcenas, strongly denied any wrongdoing. However, in July 2013, shortly after Bárcenas' imprisonment, El Mundo reported that Bárcenas accepted that there had been irregular funding of the People's Party.

There has been speculation that the money Bárcenas kept in Switzerland was connected to party funding. Such a connection has been denied by Bárcenas and the People's Party, but has been supported by the testimony of Francisco Correa. Bárcenas has said that the money in question came from his own business interests. One of these interests was claimed to be art dealing, supposedly a cash-rich activity.

== Imprisonment, release on bail and trial ==
Facing a range of charges including tax fraud and money-laundering, on 27 June 2013, Bárcenas was sent to prison pending trial. The decision not to grant bail at that time was taken by judge Pablo Ruz to "avoid the risk of flight and ensure the preservation of sources of evidence". He was released on bail in January 2015. Judge Ruz had announced the previous summer that he was in a position to proceed against 45 Gürtel suspects, including Bárcenas.

Because of the size of the case (Gürtel is described in Spanish as a macrojuicio or "mega-trial"), it was divided into different "epochs". The trial began in October 2016 with 1999-2005 as the epoch under investigation. Verdicts in respect of these initial proceedings were announced in May 2018. On 24 May 2018 Bárcenas was given a 33-year prison sentence, while his wife Rosalía Iglesias was given a 15-year sentence.

== Personal life ==
Bárcenas is married to Rosalía Iglesias Villar, who was also sentenced to a prison term in May 2018. The couple's son, Guillermo, is a musician, known for his participation in a group called Taburete. Bárcenas also has a son from a previous marriage.

== Media portrayal ==
Bárcenas was played by the actor Pedro Casablanc in the 2015 film B, la película. Casablanc's performance was nominated for the Goya Award for Best Actor.
