= Arrest Warrant of 11 April 2000 case =

2002 International court of Justice case

Arrest Warrant of 11 April 2000
- Court: International Court of Justice
- Full case name: Case Concerning the Arrest Warrant of 11 April 2000 (Democratic Republic of the Congo v. Belgium)
- Decided: February 14, 2002

Case Concerning the Arrest Warrant of 11 April 2000 (Democratic Republic of the Congo v Belgium) [2002] ICJ 1 was a public international law case before the International Court of Justice (ICJ) with a judgment issued on 14 February 2002.

== Facts ==
In 1993, the Belgian Parliament voted a "law of universal jurisdiction" to allow it to judge people accused of war crimes, crimes against humanity or genocide. In 2001, four people from Rwanda were convicted and given sentences from 12 to 20 years' imprisonment for their involvement in 1994 Rwandan genocide. There was quickly an explosion of suits deposed.

An arrest warrant issued in 2000 under this law against Abdoulaye Yerodia Ndombasi, Minister of Foreign Affairs of the Democratic Republic of the Congo, was challenged before the International Court of Justice in the case entitled Arrest Warrant of 11 April 2000 (Democratic Republic of the Congo v. Belgium).

== Judgment ==
On 14 February 2002, the judgment was handed down, and the ICJ issued a press release:

The Court found that the issue and international circulation by Belgium of the arrest warrant of 11 April 2000 against Abdulaye Yerodia Ndombasi failed to respect the immunity from criminal jurisdiction and the inviolability which the incumbent Minister for Foreign Affairs of the Congo enjoyed under international law; and that Belgium must cancel the arrest warrant.

In its Judgment, which is final, without appeal and binding for the Parties, the Court found, by 13 votes to 3, "that the issue against Mr. Abdulaye Yerodia Ndombasi of the arrest warrant of 11 April 2000, and its international circulation, constituted violations of a legal obligation of the Kingdom of Belgium towards the Democratic Republic of the Congo, in that they failed to respect the immunity from criminal jurisdiction and the inviolability which the incumbent Minister for Foreign Affairs of the Democratic Republic of the Congo enjoyed under international law"; and, by 10 votes to 6, "that the Kingdom of Belgium must, by means of its own choosing, cancel the arrest warrant of 11 April 2000 and so inform the authorities to whom that warrant was circulated".

The Court reached these findings after having found, by 15 votes to 1, that it had jurisdiction, that the Application of the Democratic Republic of the Congo ("the Congo") was not without object (and the case accordingly not moot) and that the Application was admissible, thus rejecting the objections which the Kingdom of Belgium ("Belgium") had raised on those questions.

The court limited the scope of its judgment to the immunity from criminal jurisdiction and the inviolability of an incumbent minister for foreign affairs and that as none of the treaties brought to the attention of the court covered this issue that the court must decide the issue based on customary international law. But it rejected Belgium's argument that because the parties had not raised the issue of "the disputed arrest warrant, issued by the Belgian investigating judge in exercise of his purported universal jurisdiction, complied in that regard with the rules and principles of international law governing the jurisdiction of national courts, because that question was not contained in the final submissions of the Parties." and concluded that this did not stop the court dealing with certain aspects of that question in the reasoning of its Judgment.

Referring to the few existing decisions of national high courts, such as the House of Lords and the French Court of Cassation they concluded that immunity was not granted to state officials for their own benefit, but to ensure the effective performance of their functions on behalf of their respective state; and when abroad that they enjoy full immunity from arrest in another state on criminal charges including charges of war crimes or crimes against humanity.

The court noted that this immunity from jurisdiction of a foreign national court, existed even when foreign national courts exercise an extended criminal jurisdiction on the basis of various international conventions that covered the prevention and punishment of certain serious crimes. However the court emphasized that "While jurisdictional immunity is procedural in nature, criminal responsibility is a question of substantive law. Jurisdictional immunity may well bar prosecution for a certain period or for certain offences; it cannot exonerate the person to whom it applies from all criminal responsibility."

== See also ==
- List of International Court of Justice cases
