= Manuel Moix =

Spanish lawyer

Attorney Manuel Moix
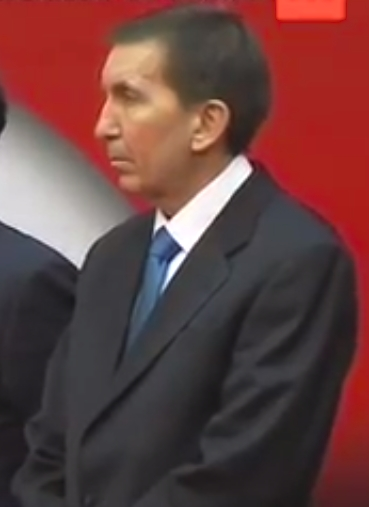

Anti-Corruption Chief Prosecutor
- In office 24 February 2017 – 1 June 2017

Personal details
- Born: 1958 (age 67–68)

Manuel Moix (born 1958) is a Spanish lawyer. After serving as a public prosecutor in the Community of Madrid, he was appointed Spain's "top anti-corruption prosecutor" from February 2017. He resigned on 1 June 2017, after admitting he owned 25% of a Panamanian offshore company.

Moix and his siblings owned an offshore company in Panama, which was apparently inherited from their parents. The company, Duchesse Financial Overseas, was set up in 1988, and in 1990 bought a luxury villa near Madrid worth approximately €550,000.

Moix also received criticism for other issues. He is alleged to have attempted to interfere in corruption investigations, including the "Lezo Case", involving the governing People's Party.
