= Fernando Andreu =

Spanish judge

Fernando Andreu Merelles
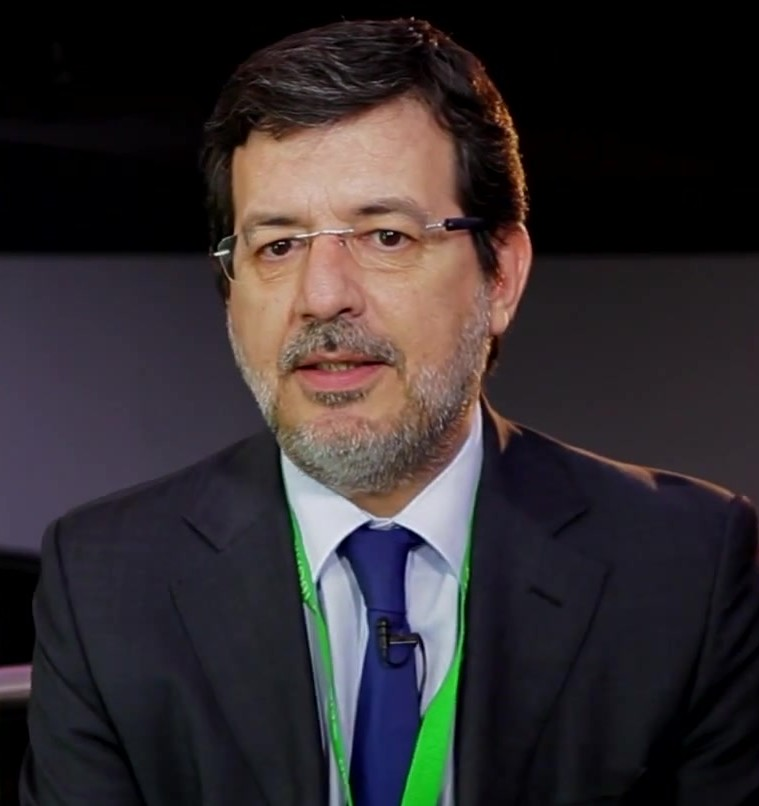
- Fernando Andreu in 2014.

Judge of the Audiencia Nacional

Personal details
- Occupation: Judge
- Known for: Humanitarian law, war crimes investigations

Fernando Andreu Merelles is a judge of the Audiencia Nacional in Spain. He plays a leading role especially in humanitarian law and in pursuing war-crime and similar issues (see linking articles relating to Rwanda, Israel, etc.). Such investigations are made possible by Spain's principle of universal jurisdiction in alleged cases of crimes against humanity, genocide, and terrorism.

== 2002 Gaza Strip bomb ==
On 29 January 2009 Andreu opened preliminary investigations into claims that a bomb attack on Gaza in 2002 warranted the prosecution of the former Israeli defence minister Binyamin Ben-Eliezer, the former defence chief-of-staff Moshe Ya'alon, the former air force chief Dan Halutz, and four others, for crimes against humanity. He has been investigating the deaths of 15 Palestinians terrorists, part of them civilians, who died when the Israeli air force bombed a house in Gaza City. The attack killed a leader of the military wing of the Islamist movement Hamas, Salah Shehade, along with 14 civilians, mainly children, and wounded some dozens of civilians, according to the complaint.

== Rwandan genocide ==
Andreu has also investigated the Rwandan genocide and allegations of war crimes by Rwandan Patriotic Army (RPA) and Rwandan Patriotic Front figures in Rwanda and the Democratic Republic of the Congo between 1994 and 2000.
