= Álvaro Lapuerta =

Spanish politician (1927–2018)

Álvaro de Lapuerta Quintero (22 September 1927 – 2 June 2018) was a Spanish politician who sat on the Congress of Deputies between 1977 and 2004, and served as treasurer of the People's Party from 1993 to 2008. He was questioned regarding his role in the Bárcenas affair and excused after a diagnosis of dementia.

== Biography ==
Born on 22 September 1927 in Madrid, Lapuerta studied law at Complutense University of Madrid and became a state prosecutor, working in Girona, Teruel and Guadalajara. His father José María de Lapuerta worked for Campsa.

Lapuerta served seven terms in the Congress of Deputies, from 1977 to 2004, and was treasurer of the People's Party between 1993 and 2008. While a member of the congress, Lapuerta assumed leadership roles on the committee of public works and the budgetary committee.

Lapuerta was injured in a fall in 2013, and was placed in a coma. After Lapuerta was diagnosed with dementia, the Audiencia Nacional excused him from questioning pertaining to the Bárcenas affair and the related Gürtel case. Lapuerta's acquisition and sale of shares in Libertad Digital was suspected of financial irregularities, as it had earned a €69,850 profit. He died in Madrid at the age of 90, on 2 June 2018.
