= Francisco Correa Sánchez =

Spanish businessperson and convict

- Born: Francisco Correa Sánchez; 31 October 1955 (age 70); Casablanca, Morocco
- Occupation: businessman

Francisco Correa Sánchez (born 31 October 1955) is a Spanish businessman, convicted in 2018 on charges related to the Gürtel affair, a major corruption scandal. He was the leader of a network which has become known to the public as Gurtel, a designation originally coined by the police in a cryptic allusion to his surname, Correa (see note^{1}). He was sentenced to 51 years in prison.

Correa began his career in the travel industry. He created a network of companies in Spain and abroad.

He was arrested by the Spanish authorities in 2009 during investigations into Gurtel. Facing charges of bribery, influence peddling, money laundering, tax fraud, conspiracy and documentary falsification, he was imprisoned on remand. He was released on bail in 2012: the judge had reduced the sum required to 200,000 euros, a reduction reflecting not only the accused's perceived ability to pay, but also the length of time he had been held on remand, which was approaching the maximum possible under Spanish law. His trial began in 2016.

== Notes ==
1. "Correa" can be translated into English as "belt" or in German "Gürtel".
