= Anti-Corruption Prosecutor's Office =

Spanish special prosecutor's office

- Fiscalía Anticorrupción
- Emblem of the Spanish Prosecutors

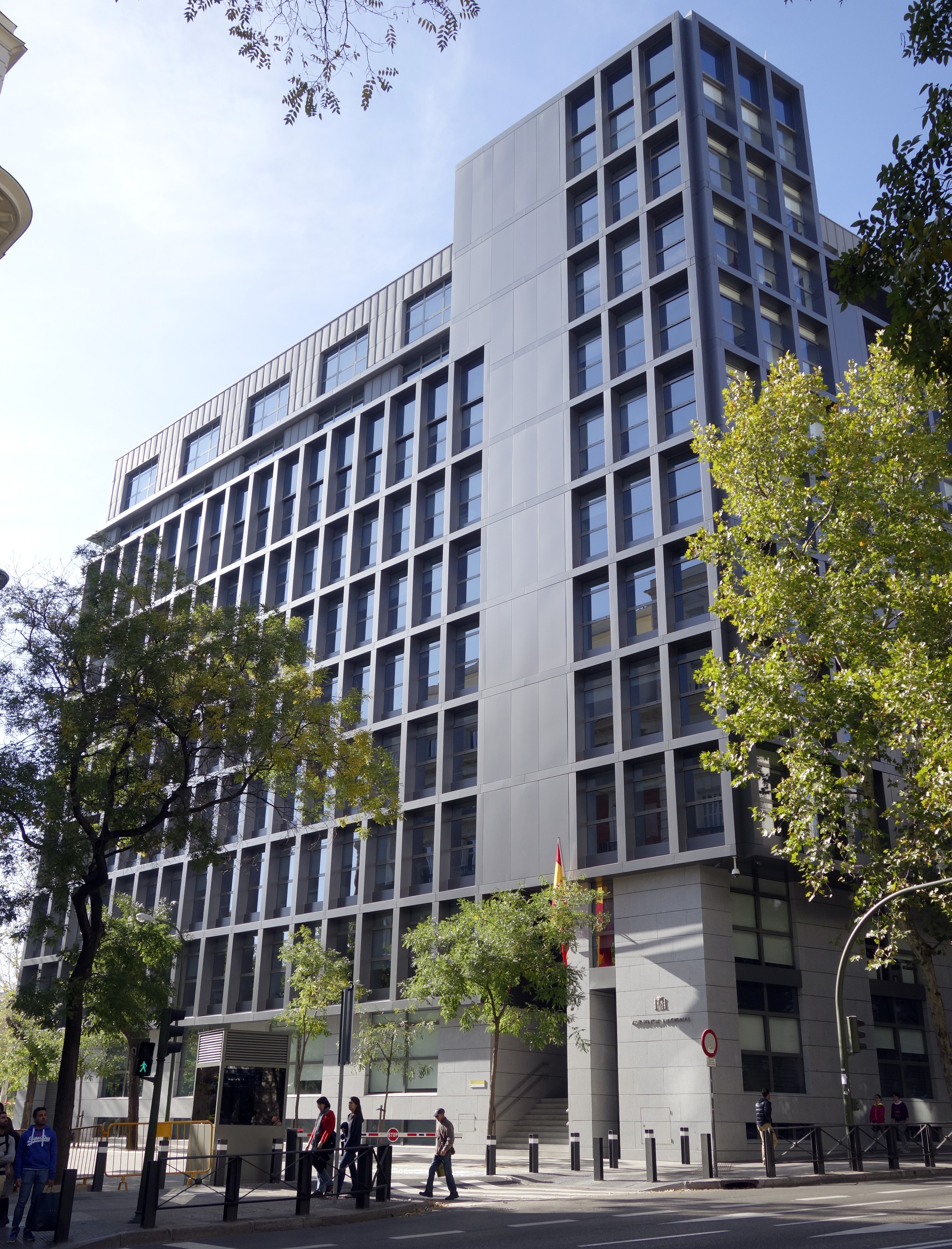
- Audiencia Nacional's Headquarters

Agency overview
- Formed: 24 April 1995; 31 years ago
- Jurisdiction: Spain
- Headquarters: 4 Manuel Silvela Street, Madrid
- Employees: 131 (2024)
- Agency executives: Alejandro Luzón Cánovas, Chief Prosecutor; Antonio Romeral Moraleda, Lieutenant Prosecutor
- Parent agency: Prosecution Ministry
- Website: www.fiscal.es

The Anti-Corruption Prosecutor's Office, officially Special Prosecutor's Office Against Corruption and Organized Crime, is a specialized office of the Spanish Prosecution Ministry responsible for the investigation of serious offences related to financial crimes, political corruption and those related to organized crime. It also coordinates the actions of other public prosecutor's offices throughout the country that handle cases within its jurisdiction. Although this prosecutor's office acts before the Audiencia Nacional, it is not part of the Public Prosecutor's Office before that court. Its headquarters are located in the mansion at number 4 Manuel Silvela Street, Madrid.

The Prosecutor's Office is headed by a top-level prosecutor—a Supreme Court Prosecutor—with the title of Chief Prosecutor. Since July 2017, Alejandro Luzón Cánovas has served as Anti-Corruption Chief Prosecutor.

== Powers ==
According to Article 19.4 of the Prosecution Ministry Organic Statute (EOMF), the Special Prosecutor's Office Against Corruption and Organized Crime is responsible for investigating and taking part in criminal procedures related to the following offences:

- Offences against the Public Treasury, against Social Security, and smuggling.
- Malfeasance.
- Abuse or misuse of privileged information.
- Embezzlement.
- Fraud and illegal exactions.
- Influence peddling.
- Bribery.
- Prohibited negotiations by public officials.
- Fraud.
- Punishable insolvency.
- Price fixing in public tenders and auctions.
- Offences related to intellectual and industrial property, the market, and consumers.
- Corporate offences.
- Money laundering and related conduct such as receiving stolen goods, except when, due to their connection with drug trafficking or terrorism offences, jurisdiction over such conduct lies with other Special Prosecutor's Offices.
- Corruption in international business transactions.
- Corruption in the private sector.
- Offences related to the above.
- The investigation of all types of legal business, transactions or movements of goods, securities or capital, economic flows or patrimonial assets, which appear to be related to the activity of organized criminal groups or to the economic exploitation of criminal activities, as well as the related or determining crimes of such activities; except when, due to their relationship with drug trafficking or terrorism crimes, the Anti-Drug Prosecutor's Office or the National Court's Prosecutor's Office is responsible for knowing about said conduct.

== Organization ==
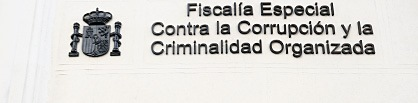

According to the staffing plan of the Public Prosecutor's Office approved by Royal Decree 422/2025, of June 3, the Special Anti-Corruption Prosecutor's Office is made up of a Chief Prosecutor of the first category, a Deputy Prosecutor and 27 Prosecutors, all of the second category. In addition to the central organization, the Anti-Corruption Prosecutor's Office had 23 permanent delegated prosecutors and six temporary ones in certain provinces and municipalities at the end of 2024. As for the civil servants of the Prosecutor's Office, the staff includes 31 permanent and temporary civil servants.

Furthermore, to assist the Special Prosecutor's Office, there are support units from the Tax Agency, the Office of the Comptroller General of the State, the National Police Corps, and the Civil Guard.

== History ==
It was created in 1995, during prime minister Felipe González's fourth term, through Law 10/1995 of April 24, with Juan Alberto Belloch as Minister of Justice and Carlos Granados Pérez as Prosecutor General. The first Chief Prosecutor was Carlos Jiménez Villarejo, who held the post until 2003.

Later, prosecutor general Jesús Cardenal proposed the suppression of the Anti-Corruption Prosecutor's Office, considering that "it would be good that this should fall within the competence of all prosecutors, just as the others are not considered specializations, in the sense that they do not have a special Prosecutor’s Office except for drug-related offences". This proposal, which was rejected by the political opposition and prosecutors' associations, and which was ignored by the Aznar government, did not succeed.

By 2004, the Anti-Corruption Prosecutor's Office was on the verge of disappearing, following the conflicts arising from the dismissal of Jiménez Villarejo. It had only ten prosecutors, nine in Madrid, and one in Barcelona, with a central office located in an apartment in Madrid, and only one Delegated Prosecutor's Office in Catalonia.

During the term of his successor, Magistrate Cándido Conde-Pumpido, the Anti-Corruption Prosecutor's Office was strengthened, reforming the Organic Statute in 2007, to give it new powers, turning it into the Special Prosecutor's Office Against Corruption and Organized Crime. In this regard, a year earlier Conde-Pumpido had created six new territorial delegations in conflictive areas of the coast, and from that moment on the staff began to be reinforced, both at the headquarters and in the delegations. By 2011, the Prosecutor's Office had 40 prosecutors, its headquarters were moved to an independent building at Manuel Silvela Street and the territorial structure was integrated by a dozen of delegated prosecutor's offices, in addition to strengthening the four support teams available to the Prosecutor's Office, drawn from the Office of the Comptroller General of the State, the Tax Agency, the National Police Corps and the Civil Guard.

== Anti-Corruption Chief Prosecutor ==
The Chief Prosecutor of the Special Prosecutor's Office Against Corruption and Organized Crime is a first-class prosecutor, appointed by the Monarch, on the advice of the Government, on the proposal of the Prosecutor General of the State, after consulting the Fiscal Council, for a period of five years, renewable.

=== List of chief prosecutors ===
Since the Anti-Corruption Prosecutor's Office was founded in 1995, four people have held the position of Chief Prosecutor. The longest-serving was Antonio Salinas Casado, with 13 years, 214 days between 2003 and 2017. Manuel Moix Blázquez served the shortest time as Chief Prosecutor, holding the position for 98 days.

Name		Tenure			Ref.
Name		Start	End	Duration	Ref.
1	Carlos Jiménez Villarejo (born 1935)	13 October 1995	25 July 2003	7 years, 285 days	
2	Antonio Salinas Casado (born 1946)	25 July 2003	24 February 2017	13 years, 214 days	
3	Manuel Moix (born 1958)	24 February 2017	2 June 2017	98 days	
4	Alejandro Luzón Cánovas (born 1964)	2 June 2017	Incumbent	9 years, 67 days	
