= Penélope Cruz filmography =

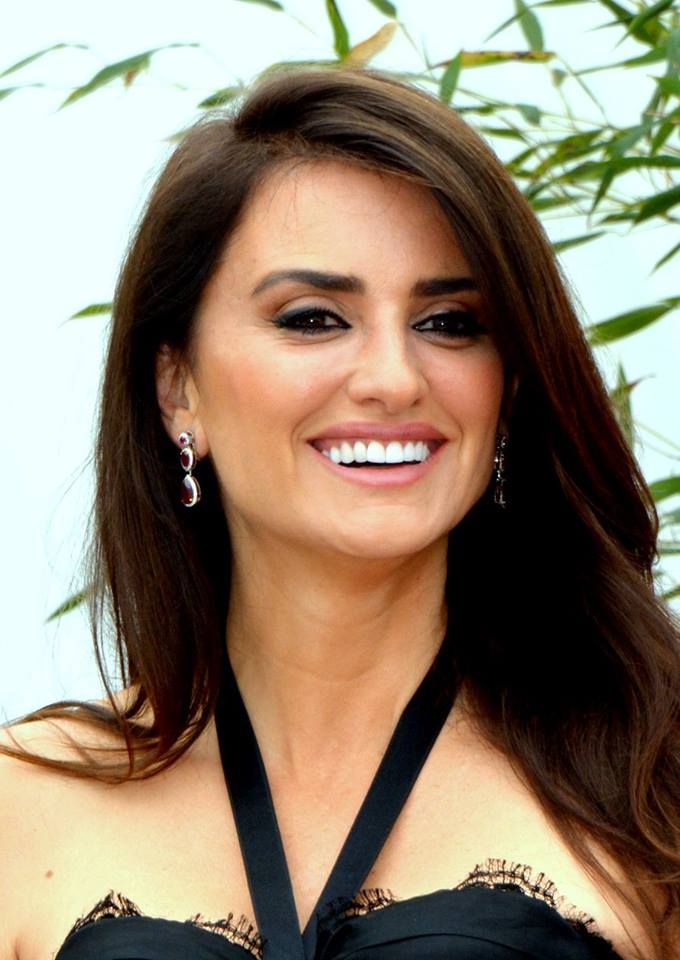
Cruz at the 2018 Cannes Film Festival

Penélope Cruz (born 28 April 1974) is a Spanish actress. She won the Academy Award for Best Supporting Actress for her role in the Woody Allen comedy-drama Vicky Cristina Barcelona (2008). She is the first and only Spanish actress to both win and be nominated for an Academy Award in an acting category. She also was Oscar-nominated for her roles in the drama Volver (2006), the romance musical Nine (2009), and the melodrama Parallel Mothers (2021).

She made her acting debut at the age of 16 on television and her feature film debut the following year in the romantic tragicomedy Jamón Jamón (1992). Her subsequent roles in the 1990s and 2000s included Belle époque (1992), Open Your Eyes (1997), The Hi-Lo Country (1998), The Girl of Your Dreams (2000) and Woman on Top (2000). During this time she gained acclaim for her numerous collaborations with Spanish director Pedro Almodóvar in Live Flesh (1997), All About My Mother (1999), Volver (2006), Broken Embraces (2009), I'm So Excited! (2013), Pain and Glory (2019), and Parallel Mothers (2021). For her role in Volver she won the Cannes Film Festival Award for Best Actress at the 59th Cannes Film Festival.

Cruz achieved greater international recognition for her lead roles in Hollywood films such as the psychological thriller Vanilla Sky (2001), the crime drama Blow (2001), the action-adventure Sahara (2005), the fantasy adventure Pirates of the Caribbean: On Stranger Tides (2011), the crime thriller The Counselor (2013), the murder mystery Murder on the Orient Express (2017), and the sports drama Ferrari (2023). She has also worked in with auteur directors acting in independent films such as the drama Elegy (2008), the romantic comedy To Rome with Love (2012), the mystery Everybody Knows (2018), the spy thriller Wasp Network (2019) the satirical comedy Official Competition (2021), and the coming-of-age drama L'immensità (2022).

She portrayed as fashion designer Donatella Versace in the FX limited series The Assassination of Gianni Versace: American Crime Story for which she was nominated for the Primetime Emmy Award for Outstanding Supporting Actress in a Limited or Anthology Series or Movie.

== Film ==
Key
†	Denotes films that have not yet been released

Year	Title	Role	Notes	Ref.
1992	Jamón, jamón (Ham, Ham)	Silvia		
1992	Belle époque (The Beautiful Era)	Luz		
1993	For Love, Only for Love	Mary	Per amore, solo per amore	
1993	The Greek Labyrinth	Elise	El Laberinto griego	
1993	The Rebel	Enza	La Ribelle	
1994	Alegre ma non troppo (Cheerful But Not Too Much So)	Salomé		
1994	Todo es mentira (It's All A Lie)	Lucía		
1995	Entre rojas (Among Redheads)	Lucía		
1996	La Celestina	Melibea		
1996	Brujas	Patricia		
1996	Not Love, Just Frenzy	Laura	Más que amor, frenesí	
1997	Love Can Seriously Damage Your Health	Diana	El amor perjudica seriamente la salud	
1997	Open Your Eyes	Sofia	Abre los ojos	
1997	Live Flesh	Isabel Plaza Caballero	Carne trémula	
1997	Et hjørne af paradis (A Corner Of Paradise)	Helena		
1998	The Girl of Your Dreams	Macarena	La niña de tus ojos	
1998	Talk of Angels	Pilar		
1998	The Hi-Lo Country	Josepha		
1998	Don Juan	Mathurine		
1999	All About My Mother	Maria Rosa Sanz	Todo sobre mi madre	
1999	The Man with Rain in His Shoes	Louise		
1999	Volavérunt (They Flew Away)	Pepita Tudó / la Maja		
2000	All the Pretty Horses	Alejandra Villarreal		
2000	Woman on Top	Isabella Oliveira		
2001	Blow	Mirtha Jung		
2001	Don't Tempt Me	Carmen Ramos	Bendito infierno	
2001	Captain Corelli's Mandolin	Pelagia		
2001	Vanilla Sky	Sofia Serrano	American adaptation of Abre los ojos	
2002	Waking Up in Reno	Brenda		
2003	Fanfan la Tulipe (Fanfan the Tulip)	Adeline la Franchise		
2003	Masked and Anonymous	Pagan Lace		
2003	Gothika	Chloe Sava		
2004	Head in the Clouds	Mia		
2004	Noel	Nina Vasquez		
2004	Don't Move	Italia	Non ti muovere	
2005	Sahara	Eva Rojas		
2005	Chromophobia	Gloria		
2006	Bandidas (Female Outlaws)	Maria Alvarez		
2006	Volver	Raimunda	Academy Award nomination for Best Actress	
2007	Manolete	Antonita Sino		
2007	The Good Night	Anna		
2008	Elegy	Consuela Castillo		
2008	Vicky Cristina Barcelona	Maria Elena	Won the Academy Award for Best Supporting Actress	
2009	G-Force	Juarez	Voice only	
2009	Broken Embraces	Magdalena	Los abrazos rotos	
2009	Nine	Carla Albanese	Academy Award nomination for Best Supporting Actress	
2010	Sex and the City 2	Carmen García Carrión		
2011	Pirates of the Caribbean: On Stranger Tides	Angelica		
2012	To Rome with Love	Anna		
2012	Twice Born	Gemma	Venuto al mondo	
2013	I'm So Excited!	Jessica	Los amantes pasajeros	
2013	The Counselor	Laura		
2014	The Boxtrolls	Winnie Portley-Rind	Voice only (Spanish dub)	
2015	Ma Ma	Magda	Also producer	
2016	Zoolander 2	Valentina Valencia		
2016	Grimsby	Rhonda George		
2016	The Queen of Spain	Macarena Granada	La reina de España	
2017	Loving Pablo	Virginia Vallejo		
2017	Murder on the Orient Express	Pilar Estravados		
2018	Everybody Knows	Laura	Todos lo saben	
2019	Pain and Glory	Jacinta	Dolor y gloria	
2019	Wasp Network	Olga Gonzalez		
2021	Parallel Mothers	Janis Martínez Moreno	Academy Award nomination for Best Actress	
2021	Official Competition	Lola Cuevas	Competencia oficial	
2022	The 355	Graciela Rivera		
2022	L'immensità (The Immensity)	Clara		
2022	On the Fringe	Azucena	Also producer; En los márgenes	
2023	Ferrari	Laura Ferrari		
2026	The Invite	Pina		
2026	The Bride!	Myrna Malloy		
2026	La bola negra (The Black Ball)	Nené Romero		
2026	Bunker	Sofia		
2027	Day Drinker †	Cara Lauzzana	Post-production	
2027	Paris Paramount †		Filming	

Key
†	Denotes films that have not yet been released

== Television ==
Year	Title	Role	Notes
1990	Los mundos de Yupi	Sleeping Beauty	Episode: "Las manzanas"
1991	Softly from Paris	Javotte	Série rose; Episode: "Elle et lui"
1992	Framed	Lola Del Moreno	Main role
2018	The Assassination of Gianni Versace: American Crime Story	Donatella Versace	Main role
2020	Home Movie: The Princess Bride	Prince Humperdinck / Princess Buttercup	Episode: "Chapter Nine: Have Fun Storming the Castle!"

== Music videos ==
Year	Artist	Song	Ref.
1989	Mecano	"La Fuerza del Destino"	

== Bibliography ==
- Benavent, Francisco María (2000). Cine español de los 90. Diccionario de películas, directores y temático. Bilbao: Ediciones Mensajero. ISBN 84-271-2326-4.
