= List of awards and nominations received by Penélope Cruz =

Penelope Cruz awards and nominations
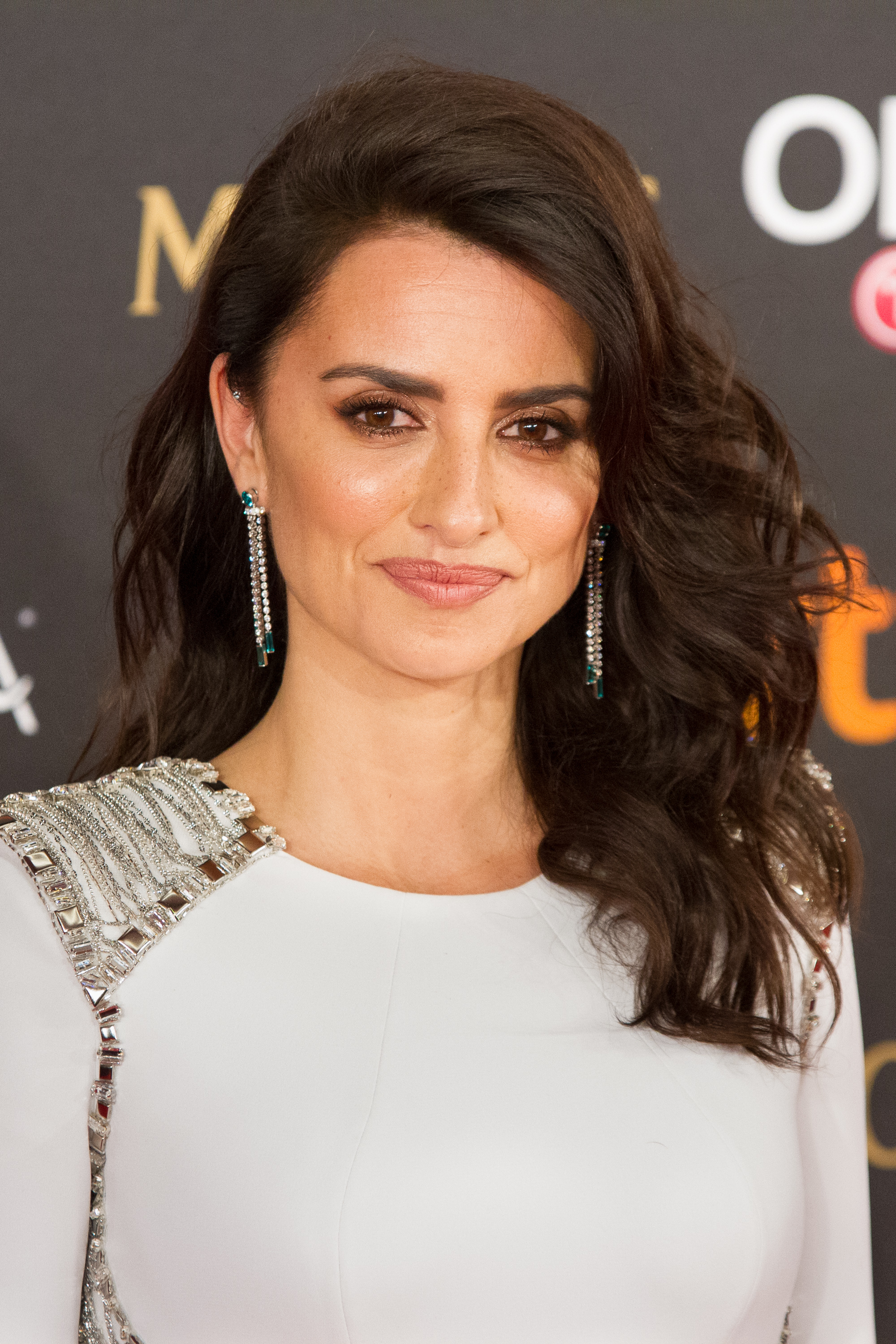
- Cruz at the 2018 Goya Awards
Awards and nominations
Award	Wins	Nominations
Academy Awards	1	4
Actor Awards	0	6
BAFTA Awards	1	2
Critics' Choice Awards	0	3
Emmy Awards	0	1
Golden Globe Awards	0	4
Grammy Awards	1	1

Totals (Note: Certain award groups do not simply award one winner. They acknowledge several different recipients, have runners-up, and have third place. Since this is a specific recognition and is different from losing an award, runner-up mentions are considered wins in this award tally. For simplification and to avoid errors, each award in this list has been presumed to have had a prior nomination.)
- Wins: 52
- Nominations: 156

Penélope Cruz is a Spanish actress. Over her career she has received numerous accolades including an Academy Award, a BAFTA Award, a Cannes Film Festival Award, three Goya Awards, and an Independent Spirit Award as well as nominations for a Primetime Emmy Award, a Latin Grammy Award, four Golden Globe Awards, and six Actor Awards. Cruz received an Honorary Cesar in 2018.

Cruz is known for her numerous collaborations with Spanish filmmaker Pedro Almodóvar starting in 1997. She gained widespread acclaim for her role playing Raimunda, a resilient working-class mother in suburban Madrid in the Almodóvar's dramedy Volver (2006). She won several awards including the Cannes Film Festival Award for Best Actress as well as nominations for the Academy Award, the BAFTA Award, Golden Globe Award, and the Actor Award. She starred as Maria Elana, passionate and emotionally unstable ex-wife of an artist in Woody Allen's romance Vicky Cristina Barcelona (2008) for which she won the Academy Award for Best Supporting Actress. She is the first Spanish actress to have been nominated for an Academy Award, as well as the first and only to have won the award. She also won the BAFTA Award, and Independent Spirit Award with nominations for the Golden Globe Awards and the Actor Award for Best Supporting Actress.

For her role as Carla Albanese, a seductive mistress in Rob Marshall's musical drama Nine (2009) she was nominated for the Academy Award for Best Supporting Actress, the Golden Globe Award for Best Supporting Actress – Motion Picture, and the Actor Award for Outstanding Performance by a Female Actor in a Supporting Role. She reunited with Almodóvar playing Janis Martínez Moreno, a professional photographer in Madrid who meets a mysterious woman in the melodrama Parallel Mothers (2021). For her performance she won the Volpi Cup for Best Actress with a nomination for the Academy Award for Best Actress. She portrayed Laura Ferrari, the wife of Enzo Ferrari in the Michael Mann directed biographical sports drama Ferrari (2023) for which she was nominated for the Actor Award for Outstanding Actress in a Supporting Role.

On television, she portrayed fashion designer Donatella Versace in the FX limited series The Assassination of Gianni Versace: American Crime Story she was nominated for the Primetime Emmy Award for Outstanding Supporting Actress in a Limited Series or Movie, the Golden Globe Award for Best Supporting Actress – Series, Miniseries or Television Film, the Critics' Choice Television Award for Best Supporting Actress in a Movie/Miniseries, and the Actor Award for Outstanding Performance by a Female Actor in a Miniseries or Television Movie. In music, she was nominated for the Latin Grammy Award for Best Short Form Music Video for "313" (with Residente & Sílvia Pérez Cruz).

== Major associations ==
=== Academy Awards ===
Academy Awards
Year	Category	Nominated work	Result	Ref.
2006	Best Actress	Volver	Nominated	
2008	Best Supporting Actress	Vicky Cristina Barcelona	Won	
2009	Best Supporting Actress	Nine	Nominated	
2021	Best Actress	Parallel Mothers	Nominated	

=== Actor Awards ===
Year	Category	Nominated work	Result	Ref.
2006	Outstanding Female Actor in a Leading Role	Volver	Nominated	
2008	Outstanding Female Actor in a Supporting Role	Vicky Cristina Barcelona	Nominated	
2009	Outstanding Female Actor in a Supporting Role	Nine	Nominated	
2009	Outstanding Cast in a Motion Picture	Nine	Nominated	
2018	Outstanding Female Actor in a Miniseries or Television Movie	The Assassination of Gianni Versace	Nominated	
2023	Outstanding Female Actor in a Supporting Role	Ferrari	Nominated	

=== BAFTA Awards ===
Year	Category	Nominated work	Result	Ref.
British Academy Film Awards
2006	Best Actress in a Leading Role	Volver	Nominated	
2008	Best Actress in a Supporting Role	Vicky Cristina Barcelona	Won	

=== Critics' Choice Awards ===
Year	Category	Nominated work	Result	Ref.
Critics' Choice Movie Awards
2006	Best Actress	Volver	Nominated	
2008	Best Supporting Actress	Vicky Cristina Barcelona	Nominated	
2009	Best Acting Ensemble	Nine	Nominated	
Critics' Choice Television Awards
2018	Best Supporting Actress in a Movie/Miniseries	The Assassination of Gianni Versace	Nominated	

=== Emmy Awards ===
Year	Category	Nominated work	Result	Ref.
Primetime Emmy Awards
2018	Outstanding Supporting Actress in a Limited Series or Movie	The Assassination of Gianni Versace	Nominated	

=== Golden Globe Awards ===
Year	Category	Nominated work	Result	Ref.
2006	Best Actress in a Motion Picture – Drama	Volver	Nominated	
2008	Best Supporting Actress – Motion Picture	Vicky Cristina Barcelona	Nominated	
2009	Best Supporting Actress – Motion Picture	Nine	Nominated	
2018	Best Supporting Actress – Series, Miniseries, or TV Film	The Assassination of Gianni Versace	Nominated	

=== Grammy Awards ===
Year	Category	Nominated work	Result	Ref.
Latin Grammy Awards
2024	Best Short Form Music Video	"313" (with Residente & Sílvia Pérez Cruz)	Won	

== Miscellaneous awards ==
Organizations	Year	Category	Work	Result	Ref.
AACTA International Awards	2022	Best Actress	Parallel Mothers	Nominated	
AACTA International Awards	2024	Best Supporting Actress	Ferrari	Nominated	
Actors and Actresses Union Awards	2007	Best Film Actress in a Leading Role	Volver	Won	
Actors and Actresses Union Awards	2009	Best Film Actress in a Secondary Role	Vicky Cristina Barcelona	Nominated	
Actors and Actresses Union Awards	2010	Best Film Actress in a Leading Role	Broken Embraces	Nominated	
Actors and Actresses Union Awards	2017	Best Film Actress in a Leading Role	The Queen of Spain	Nominated	
Actors and Actresses Union Awards	2018	Best Film Actress in a Leading Role	Loving Pablo	Nominated	
Actors and Actresses Union Awards	2019	Best Film Actress in a Leading Role	Everybody Knows	Nominated	
Actors and Actresses Union Awards	2019	Best Actress in an International Production	American Crime Story: Versace	Won	
Actors and Actresses Union Awards	2020	Best Film Actress in a Leading Role	Pain and Glory	Nominated	
Actors and Actresses Union Awards	2022	Best Film Actress in a Leading Role	Parallel Mothers	Nominated	
Actors and Actresses Union Awards	2022	Best Actress in an International Production	Official Competition	Nominated	
Actors and Actresses Union Awards	2023	Best Actress in an International Production	L'immensità	Nominated	
Astra Midseason Movie Awards	2026	Best Supporting Actress	The Invite	Won	
Cannes Film Festival	2006	Best Actress	Volver	Won	
David di Donatello Awards	2004	Best Actress in a Leading Role	Don't Move	Won	
David di Donatello Awards	2023	Best Actress in a Leading Role	L'immensità	Nominated	
European Film Awards	1999	Best Actress	The Girl of Your Dreams	Nominated	
European Film Awards	2003	People's Choice Award for Best Actress	Fanfan la Tulipe	Nominated	
European Film Awards	2004	People's Choice Award for Best Actress	Don't Move	Won	
European Film Awards	2004	Best Actress	Don't Move	Nominated	
European Film Awards	2006	Best Actress	Volver	Won	
European Film Awards	2009	Best Actress	Broken Embraces	Nominated	
European Film Awards	2022	Best Actress	Parallel Mothers	Nominated	
Forqué Awards	2016	Best Female Performance in a Film	Ma Ma	Nominated	
Forqué Awards	2019	Best Female Performance in a Film	Everybody Knows	Nominated	
Forqué Awards	2021	Best Female Performance in a Film	Parallel Mothers	Nominated	
Gotham Awards	2008	Gotham Tributes		Honored	
Gotham Awards	2008	Best Ensemble Performance	Vicky Cristina Barcelona	Won	
Gotham Awards	2023	Outstanding Supporting Performance	Ferrari	Nominated	
Gotham Awards	2026	Outstanding Supporting Performance	The Invite	Pending	
Goya Awards	1993	Best Actress	Jamón jamón	Nominated	
Goya Awards	1999	Best Actress	The Girl of Your Dreams	Won	
Goya Awards	2005	Best Actress	Don't Move	Nominated	
Goya Awards	2007	Best Actress	Volver	Won	
Goya Awards	2009	Best Supporting Actress	Vicky Cristina Barcelona	Won	
Goya Awards	2010	Best Actress	Broken Embraces	Nominated	
Goya Awards	2013	Best Actress	Twice Born	Nominated	
Goya Awards	2016	Best Actress	Ma Ma	Nominated	
Goya Awards	2017	Best Actress	The Queen of Spain	Nominated	
Goya Awards	2018	Best Actress	Loving Pablo	Nominated	
Goya Awards	2019	Best Actress	Everybody Knows	Nominated	
Goya Awards	2020	Best Actress	Pain and Glory	Nominated	
Goya Awards	2022	Best Actress	Parallel Mothers	Nominated	
Goya Awards	2023	Best Supporting Actress	On the Fringe	Nominated	
Hollywood Film Festival	2006	Best Actress	Volver	Won	
Independent Spirit Awards	2009	Best Supporting Female	Vicky Cristina Barcelona	Won	
Miami International Film Festival	2022	Precious Gem Award		Honored	
Palm Springs International Film Festival	2022	Best International Actress	Parallel Mothers	Won	
Palm Springs International Film Festival	2024	Creative Impact in Acting Award	Ferrari	Won	
Platino Awards	2016	Best Actress	Ma Ma	Nominated	
Platino Awards	2019	Best Actress	Everybody Knows	Nominated	
Platino Awards	2022	Best Actress	Parallel Mothers	Nominated	
Platino Awards	2023	Best Supporting Actress	On the Fringe	Nominated	
Santa Barbara International Film Festival	2009	Outstanding Performer of the Year Award	Vicky Cristina Barcelona / Elegy	Won	
Satellite Awards	2007	Best Actress – Motion Picture Drama⁣	Volver⁣	Nominated⁣	
Satellite Awards	2009⁣	Best Supporting Actress – Motion Picture⁣	Elegy⁣	Nominated⁣	
Satellite Awards	2010⁣	Best Supporting Actress – Motion Picture⁣	Nine⁣	Nominated⁣	
Satellite Awards	2010⁣	Best Cast – Motion Picture⁣	Nine⁣	Won⁣	
Satellite Awards	2010⁣	Best Actress – Motion Picture Drama⁣	Broken Embraces⁣	Nominated⁣	
Satellite Awards	2019⁣	Best Supporting Actress – Television⁣	The Assassination of Gianni Versace⁣	Nominated	⁣
Satellite Awards	2019⁣	Best Cast – Television Series⁣	The Assassination of Gianni Versace⁣	Won⁣	
Satellite Awards	2020⁣	Best Supporting Actress – Motion Picture⁣	Pain and Glory⁣	Nominated⁣	
Satellite Awards	2021	Best Actress – Motion Picture Drama⁣	Parallel Mothers⁣	Nominated⁣	
Satellite Awards	2023	Best Actress – Motion Picture Drama⁣	Ferrari	Nominated	
Teen Choice Awards	2005	Choice Movie Actress: Action Adventure/Thriller	Sahara	Nominated	
Teen Choice Awards	2005	Choice Movie Liplock (shared with Matthew McConaughey)	Sahara	Nominated	
Teen Choice Awards	2011	Choice Movie Actress: Sci-Fi/Fantasy	Pirates of the Caribbean: On Stranger Tides	Nominated	
Venice Film Festival	2021	Volpi Cup for Best Actress	Parallel Mothers	Won	

== Critics awards ==
Organizations	Year	Category	Work	Result	Ref.
Alliance of Women Film Journalists Award	2007	Best Lead Actress in a Dramatic Performance	Volver	Nominated	
Alliance of Women Film Journalists Award	2007	Best Ensemble Cast	Volver	Nominated	
Alliance of Women Film Journalists Award	2009	Best Supporting Actress	Vicky Cristina Barcelona	Nominated	
Austin Film Critics Association	2022	Best Actress	Parallel Mothers	Nominated	
Black Reel Awards	2009	Best Supporting Actress	Vicky Cristina Barcelona	Nominated	
Boston Society of Film Critics Awards	2009	Best Supporting Actress	Vicky Cristina Barcelona	Won	
Broadcast Film Critics Association Award	2007	Best Lead Actress in a Dramatic Performance	Volver	Nominated	
Broadcast Film Critics Association Award	2009	Best Supporting Actress	Vicky Cristina Barcelona	Nominated	
Broadcast Film Critics Association Award	2010	Best Supporting Actress	Nine	Nominated	
Chicago Film Critics Association	2007	Best Lead Actress	Volver	Nominated	
Chicago Film Critics Association	2009	Best Supporting Actress	Vicky Cristina Barcelona	Nominated	
Columbus Film Critics Association	2024	Best Supporting Actress	Ferrari	Nominated	
Dallas–Fort Worth Film Critics Association	2007	Best Lead Actress	Volver	Nominated	
Dallas–Fort Worth Film Critics Association	2009	Best Supporting Actress	Vicky Cristina Barcelona	Nominated	
Detroit Film Critics Society	2009	Best Supporting Actress	Vicky Cristina Barcelona	Nominated	
Dublin Film Critics' Circle	2007	Best Lead Actress	Volver	Won	
Feroz Awards	2016	Best Main Actress in a Film	Ma Ma	Nominated	
Feroz Awards	2019	Best Main Actress in a Film	Everybody Knows	Nominated	
Feroz Awards	2020	Best Supporting Actress in a Film	Pain and Glory	Nominated	
Feroz Awards	2022	Best Main Actress in a Film	Parallel Mothers	Nominated	
Georgia Film Critics Association	2023	Best Supporting Actress	Ferrari	Nominated	
Hawaii Film Critics Society	2024	Best Supporting Actress	Ferrari	Nominated	
Houston Film Critics Society Awards	2009	Best Supporting Actress	Vicky Cristina Barcelona	Nominated	
Houston Film Critics Society Awards	2010	Best Supporting Actress	Nine	Nominated	
Houston Film Critics Society Awards	2022	Best Actress	Parallel Mothers	Nominated	
Internet Entertainment Writers Association	2007	Favorite Actress in a Leading Role	Volver	Nominated	
International Cinephile Society	2007	Best Ensemble	Volver	Nominated	
International Cinephile Society	2009	Best Actress	Parallel Mothers	Nominated	
Iowa Film Critics Awards	2009	Best Supporting Actress	Vicky Cristina Barcelona	Won	
Irish Film and Television Award	2007	Best International Actress	Volver	Nominated	
Irish Film and Television Award	2009	Best International Actress	Broken Embraces	Nominated	
Kansas City Film Critics Circle	2009	Actress of the Year	Vicky Cristina Barcelona	Won	
Latino Entertainment Journalists Association	2022	Best Actress	Parallel Mothers	Won	
Latino Entertainment Journalists Association	2024	Best Supporting Actress	Ferrari	Nominated	
Los Angeles Film Critics	2007	Best Actress	Volver	Runner-up	
Los Angeles Film Critics	2009	Best Supporting Actress	Vicky Cristina Barcelona	Won	
Los Angeles Film Critics	2022	Best Lead Actress	Parallel Mothers	Won	
Minnesota Film Critics Alliance	2022	Best Lead Actress	Parallel Mothers	Nominated	
Music City Film Critics' Association	2024	Best Supporting Actress	Ferrari	Nominated	
National Board of Review Awards	2009	Best Supporting Actress	Vicky Cristina Barcelona	Won	
National Society of Film Critics	2009	Best Supporting Actress	Vicky Cristina Barcelona	Runner-up	
National Society of Film Critics	2022	Best Lead Actress	Parallel Mothers	Won	
National Society of Film Critics	2024	Best Supporting Actress	Ferrari	Runner-up	
New York Film Critics Circle Award	2009	Best Supporting Actress	Vicky Cristina Barcelona	Won	
New York Film Critics Online Awards	2009	Actress of the Year	Vicky Cristina Barcelona	Won	
North American Film Critic Association	2022	Best Lead Actress	Parallel Mothers	Nominated	
Online Film Critics Society Award	2007	Best Actress	Volver	Nominated	
Online Film Critics Society Award	2009	Best Supporting Actress	Vicky Cristina Barcelona	Nominated	
Paris Film Critics Awards	2022	Best Lead Actress	Parallel Mothers	Nominated	
Phoenix Film Critics Society	2023	Best Supporting Actress	Ferrari	Nominated	
San Diego Film Critics Society Awards	2022	Best Actress	Parallel Mothers	Won	
San Francisco Bay Area Film Critics Circle Awards	2022	Best Lead Actress	Parallel Mothers	Nominated	
Seattle Film Critics Society	2024	Best Supporting Actress	Ferrari	Nominated	
Southeastern Film Critics Association	2009	Actress of the Year	Vicky Cristina Barcelona	Won	
St. Louis Gateway Film Critics Association	2007	Best Actress	Volver	Nominated	
Toronto Film Critics Association Awards	2007	Best Actress	Volver	Runner-up	
Toronto Film Critics Association Awards	2009	Best Supporting Actress	Vicky Cristina Barcelona	Runner-up	
Toronto Film Critics Association Awards	2022	Best Lead Actress	Parallel Mothers	Runner-up	
Washington D.C. Area Film Critics Association	2007	Best Ensemble	Volver	Nominated	

== Honorary awards ==
Organizations	Year	Award	Result	Ref.
Telluride Film Festival	2006	Silver Medallion Award	Honored	
Gotham Independent Film Award	2008	Tribute Award	Honored	
Time Magazine	2009	Time 100 Most Influential People	Honored	
Hollywood Walk of Fame	2011	Motion Picture Star on 6834 Hollywood Blvd.	Honored	
Elle Magazine	2013	Women in Hollywood Award	Honored	
César Awards	2018	Honorary César	Honored	
San Sebastián International Film Festival	2019	Donostia Award	Honored	
Museum of Modern Art	2021	Film Benefit Award	Honored	
Santa Barbara Film Festival	2022	Montecito Award	Honored	
Academy Museum of Motion Pictures	2025	Icon Award	Honored	
