= Katrina (given name) =

- Pronunciation: /kəˈtriːnə/ kə-TREE-nə
- Gender: Female

Origin
- Origin: Greek
- Meaning: Pure

Other names
- Related names: Catrìona, Caitríona, Katherine, Katerina, Katarina, Katryna, Rina, Katarzyna

Katrina or Katrine is a feminine given name. It is a derivative of Katherine.

== People ==
- Katrina Adams (born 1968), American tennis player
- Katrina Asay (born 1957), American politician
- Katrina Bayonas (born 1941), English theatrical agent, producer and manager
- Katrina Begin (born 1982), American actress
- Katrina Best, British-born Canadian author of short stories
- Katrina Bowden (born 1988), American actress
- Katrina Boyd (born 1971), Australian soccer player
- Katrina Brown, English academic
- Katrina Bryan (born 1980), Scottish stage, film and television actress and CBeebies presenter
- Katrina Callsen, American politician
- Katrina Carlson, American singer-songwriter
- Katrina Chen (born 1983), Canadian politician
- Katrina Jane Colebrook (born 1957), also known as Jane Colebrook, Jane Finch and Jane Weston, English track athlete
- Katrina Colleton (born 1971), American basketball player
- Katrina Conder, Australian television presenter
- Katrine Daugaard (born 1981), Danish politician
- Katrina del Mar, American filmmaker and photographer
- Katrina Devine (born 1980), New Zealand actor
- Katrina Rose Dideriksen (born 1983), American actress
- Katrina Dunn, Canadian actor and theatrical producer
- Katrina Edwards (1968–2014) American geomicrobiologist
- Katrina Elam (born 1983), American country music singer
- Katrina Fong Lim (born 1961), Lord Mayor of Darwin, Australia
- Katrina Forrester (born 1986), English political theorist and historian
- Katrina Foster, American Lutheran bishop
- Katrina Gibbs (born 1959), Australian track and field athlete
- Katrine Gislinge (born 1969), Danish pianist
- Katrina Gorry (born 1992), Australian soccer player
- Katrina Grant (born 1987), New Zealand netball player
- Katrina Groth (born 1982), American mechanical engineer and professor
- Katrina Halili (born 1986), Filipina actress
- Katrina Hart (born 1990), English Paralympic athlete
- Katrina Hertzer (1873–1960), American nurse during World War I
- Katrina Hibbert (born 1977), Australian basketball player
- Katrina Hodge (born 1987), British Army soldier and former Miss England winner
- Katrina Hodgkinson (born 1966), Australian politician
- Katrina Holden Bronson, American film director and actress
- Katrina Honeyman (1950–2011), British economic historian
- Katrina Infield (1978), better known as Katie Price, English television personality, businesswoman, former glamour model
- Katrina Jacks (1986–2010), Welsh rower
- Katrina Johansson, American guitarist
- Katrina McClain Johnson (born 1965), American basketball player
- Katrina Kaif (born 1983), British model and Bollywood actor
- Katrina Karkazis, American cultural and medical anthropologist
- Katrina Kendall (born 1989), Filipino-British environmental ambassador, scientist and former beauty queen
- Katrina Kittle, American novelist
- Katrina Keenan (born 1971), New Zealand cricketer
- Katrina Law (born 1985), American actress
- Katrina Legarda, Filipino lawyer and advocate
- Katrina Lehis (born 1994), Estonian épée fencer
- Katrina Leskanich (born 1960), American-born singer with Katrina and the Waves
- Katrina Leung (born 1954), Chinese American businesswoman and accused spy
- Katrina Ligett, American computer scientist
- Katrine Madsen (born 1972), Danish jazz singer
- Katrina Merriweather (born 1979), American basketball coach
- Katrina Milosevic, Australian stage and television actor
- Katrina Mitchell (born 1964), better known as Katie Mitchell, English theatre director
- Katrina Molloy, New Zealand cricketer
- Katrina Mumaw, United States Air Force pilot
- Katrina Onstad, Canadian film critic and journalist
- Katrina Orpwood, Australian synchronized swimmer
- Katrina Parker, American singer
- Katrina Parrock (born 1990), Irish camogie player
- Katrina Patchett (born 1986), Australian ballroom dancer
- Katrina Porteous (born 1960), British poet, historian, and broadcaster
- Katrina Porter (born 1988), Australian swimmer
- Katrina Powell (born 1972), Australian field hockey player
- Katrina Price (1975–1999), American basketball player
- Katrina Retallick, Australian actor
- Katrine Sakhnov (born 2006), American rhythmic gymnast
- Katrina Scott, (born 2004), American tennis player
- Katrina Sedgwick (born 1967), Australian museum and festival director
- Katrina Shankland (born 1987), American politician
- Katrina Shanks (born 1969), New Zealand politician
- Katrina Sharples, New Zealand biostatistician and violist
- Katrina Shealy (born 1954), American politician
- Katrina Skinke (born 1991), Latvian chess player
- Katrina Smith, (born 1973 or 1974), American politician
- Katrina Elayne Steward (born 1979), American choreographer and dancer
- Katrine Svane (born 1997), Danish football player
- Katrina Swett (born 1955), American politician and academic
- Katrina Szish, American television personality and journalist
- Katrina Laverne Taylor (born 1974), better known as Trina, American rapper and television personality
- Katrina Trask (1853–1922), American author and philanthropist
- Katrina vanden Heuvel (born 1959), American editor and publisher
- Katrina Velarde (born 1994), Filipina singer
- Katrina Von Sass (born 1972), Canadian volleyball player
- Katrina Voss, American broadcast meteorologist and science writer
- Katrina Warren (born 1967), veterinarian and television presenter
- Katrina Webb (born 1977), Australian Paralympic athlete
- Katrina Weidman (born 1983), American professional paranormal investigator
- Katrina Woolverton (born 1977), American singer-songwriter; born "Katrina Abrahemian" and known mononymously as "Katrina"
- Katrina Zepps (1918–1980), Australian nurse and educator

== Fictional characters ==
- Katrina, character in Lois Lowry's novel Gathering Blue
- Katrina, character in the Inheritance Cycle by Christopher Paolini
- Katrina, character in the Quest for Glory universe
- Katrina “Treena” Clark, a character in Me before you
- Katrina Evans, character in the soap opera Brookside
- Katrina Fisher, mermaid warrior, a main character in the second season of 2018 Freeform show Siren
- Princess Katrina, supporting character in the 2002 animated film Barbie as Rapunzel
- Katrina Silber, minor recurring character in Buffy the Vampire Slayer
- Katrina Spellman, doppelgänger of the protagonist in Sabrina, the Teenage Witch
- Katrina Stoneheart, main villainess in the Hanna-Barbera cartoon Pound Puppies.
- Katrina Luisa Van Horn, also known as Man-Killer, Marvel Universe supervillain
- Katrina Van Tassel, in Washington Irving's The Legend of Sleepy Hollow
- Katrina de Voort, antagonist in the 2007 film Juno

== See also ==
- Katrina (disambiguation)
- Catrina (disambiguation)
