= Penélope Cruz =

Spanish actress (born 1974)

- Cruz in 2026
- Born: Penélope Cruz Sánchez; 28 April 1974 (age 52); Alcobendas, Spain
- Occupation: Actress
- Years active: 1989–present
- Works: Full list
- Spouse: Javier Bardem (m. 2010)
- Children: 2
- Relatives: Mónica Cruz (sister)
- Awards: Full list

Penélope Cruz Sánchez (Note: /kruːz/ KROOZ, Spanish: [peˈnelope ˈkɾuθ ˈsantʃeθ].) (born 28 April 1974) is a Spanish actress who performs in both Spanish and English-language films. Her accolades include an Academy Award, a BAFTA Award, a Grammy Award, three Goya Awards and a David di Donatello.

Cruz made her acting debut on television at age 16, and her feature film debut the following year in Jamón Jamón (1992). Her subsequent roles include Belle Époque (1992), Open Your Eyes (1997), Don Juan (1998), The Girl of Your Dreams (1998), The Hi-Lo Country (1999) and Woman on Top (2000). She has performed in seven films directed by Pedro Almodóvar: Live Flesh (1997), All About My Mother (1999), Volver (2006), Broken Embraces (2009), I'm So Excited! (2013), Pain and Glory (2019), and Parallel Mothers (2021). She also produced several films she performed in, including Ma Ma (2015) and On the Fringe (2022).

For her role in Woody Allen's romantic drama Vicky Cristina Barcelona (2008), Cruz won the Academy Award for Best Supporting Actress. She was also nominated for Academy Awards for Volver (2006), Nine (2009), and Parallel Mothers (2021). Her other films include Vanilla Sky (2001), Blow (2001), Pirates of the Caribbean: On Stranger Tides (2011), Zoolander 2 (2016), Murder on the Orient Express (2017), Everybody Knows (2018), Official Competition (2022), L'immensità (2022), Ferrari (2023), The Invite (2026) and La bola negra (2026). On television, she portrayed Donatella Versace in the FX miniseries The Assassination of Gianni Versace: American Crime Story (2018), for which she received a Primetime Emmy Award nomination. Cruz has also modelled for Mango, Ralph Lauren and L'Oréal, and designed clothing for Mango with her younger sister Mónica Cruz. She has been a brand ambassador for Chanel since 2018.

== Early life ==
Cruz was born on 28 April 1974 in Alcobendas, Spain, to Encarna Sánchez, an Andalusian hairdresser, and Eduardo Cruz, an Extremaduran car mechanic. Her sister Mónica is also an actress, and her brother Eduardo is a singer and composer. She also has a paternal half-sister. She was raised Roman Catholic. In her childhood, Cruz focused on dance. She studied classical ballet for nine years at Spain's National Conservatory. She trained in Spanish ballet for three years and in theatre for four years at Cristina Rota's school. Cruz later said that ballet gave her discipline which proved important in her acting career. When Cruz became a cinephile at ten or eleven, her father bought a Betamax machine, which was rare in her neighborhood at the time.

Cruz became interested in acting as a teenager after seeing the film Tie Me Up! Tie Me Down! (1990) by Spanish director Pedro Almodóvar. She did casting calls for an agent but was rejected several times for being too young. Ultimately, the agent signed her. At age 15, Cruz won an audition at a talent agency at which more than 300 other girls had applied. In 1999, Katrina Bayonas, Cruz's agent, commented, "She was absolutely magic [at the audition]. It was obvious there was something ... impressive about this kid.... She was ... green, but there was a presence. There was just something coming from within."

Her father, Eduardo, died at his home in Spain in 2015, aged 62, from a heart attack.

== Career ==
=== 1989–1997: Early work ===
In 1989, 15-year-old Cruz made her acting debut in a music video for the Spanish pop group Mecano's song "La Fuerza del Destino". Between 1990 and 1991, she hosted the Spanish TV channel Telecinco's talk show La Quinta Marcha, a programme that was hosted by teenagers, aimed at a teenage audience. She also played in the "Elle et lui" episode of an erotic French TV series called Série rose in 1991, where she appeared nude. In 1991, Cruz made her feature film debut as the lead female role in the comedy drama art house film Jamón, jamón. In the film, she portrayed Silvia, a young woman who is expecting her first child with a man whose mother does not approve of the relationship and attempts to sabotage it by paying Javier Bardem's character to seduce her. People magazine noted that after Cruz appeared topless in the film, she became "a major sex symbol". In an interview with the Los Angeles Daily News in 1999, Cruz commented that "it was a great part, but...I wasn't really ready for the nudity. [...] But I have no regrets because I wanted to start working and it changed my life." Charlie Rose of 60 Minutes noted that Cruz "became an overnight sensation as much for her nude scenes as for her talent". When Rose asked Cruz if she was concerned about how she would be perceived after her role in the film, Cruz replied, "I just knew I had to do the complete opposite." Jamón, jamón received favorable reviews, with Chris Hicks of the Deseret News describing Cruz's portrayal of Silvia as "enchanting". Writing for the Chicago Sun-Times, film critic Roger Ebert wrote "it stars actors of considerable physical appeal, most particularly Penélope Cruz as Silvia". For her performance, Cruz was nominated for a Spanish Actors Union Newcomer Award and a Goya Award for Best Actress. The same year she appeared in the Academy Award-winning Belle Époque as the virginal Luz. People magazine noted that Cruz's role as Luz showed that she was versatile.

From 1993 to 1996, Cruz appeared in ten Spanish and Italian films. At 20, she went to live in New York for two years at Christopher and Greenwich to study ballet and English between films. She recalls learning English "kind of late", previously knowing only the dialogue she had learned for the casting and the phrases "How are you?" and "Thank you".

In 1997, Cruz appeared in the Spanish comedy film Love Can Seriously Damage Your Health. She portrays Diana, a fan of the Beatles band member John Lennon; she tries unsuccessfully to meet him. Years later, after many failed relationships, Diana re-unites with an acquaintance under unusual circumstances. That same year, she appeared in the opening scene of Pedro Almodóvar's Live Flesh as a prostitute who gives birth on a bus and in Et hjørne af paradis (A Corner of Paradise) as Doña Helena. Cruz's final appearance in 1997 was the Amenabar-directed Spanish sci-fi drama, "Abre Los Ojos"/ Open Your Eyes. She plays Sofia, the love interest of Eduardo Noriega's lead character. Open Your Eyes received positive reviews, and was later remade by U.S. director Cameron Crowe as "Vanilla Sky" (who cast Cruz in the same role and Tom Cruise in Noriega's role), but "Open Your Eyes" was not commercially successful. Kevin N. Laforest of the Montreal Film Journal commented in his September 2002 review that Cruz "has been getting some really bad reviews for her recent American work, but I personally think that she's a more than decent actress, especially here, where she's charming, moving and always believable. [...] There's one shot in particular, where Cruz enters a room in a greenish glow, which is right out of Hitchcock's picture [Vertigo]."

=== 1998–2000: Early American film roles ===
In 1998, Cruz appeared in her first American film as Billy Crudup's consolation-prize Mexican girlfriend in Stephen Frears' western film The Hi-Lo Country. Cruz stated that she had difficulties understanding people speaking English while she was filming The Hi-Lo Country. The film was critically and commercially unsuccessful. Kevin Lally of the Film Journal International commented in his review for the film that "in an ironic casting twist, the Spanish actress Penélope Cruz [...] is much more appealing as Josepha [than in her previous roles]". For her performance in the film, she was nominated for an ALMA Award for Best Actress.

Also in 1998, Cruz appeared in Don Juan and the Spanish period drama The Girl of Your Dreams. In The Girl of Your Dreams (La niña de tus ojos), Cruz portrayed Macarena Granada, a singer who is in an on-and-off relationship with Antonio Resines's character Blas. They are part of a Francoist film troupe that travels from Spain during the Spanish Civil War to Nazi Germany for a joint production with UFA. Cruz's performance in the film was praised by film critics, with Jonathan Holloland of Variety magazine writing "if confirmation is still needed that Cruz is an actress first and a pretty face second, then here it is". A writer for Film4 commented that "Cruz herself is the inevitable focus of the film" but noted that overall the film "looks great". Cruz's role as Macarena has been viewed as her "largest role to date". For her performance, Cruz received a Goya Award and Spanish Actors' Union Award, and was nominated for a European Film Award. In 1999, Cruz worked with Almodóvar again in All About My Mother, playing Sister María Rosa Sanz, a pregnant nun with AIDS. The film received favorable reviews, and was commercially successful, grossing over $67 million worldwide, although it performed better at the box office internationally than domestically.

In 2000, she appeared in Woman on Top in the lead female role as Isabelle, a world-class chef who suffered from motion sickness since birth, her first American lead role. Lisa Nesselson of Variety magazine praised the performances of both Cruz and her co-star, Harold Perrineau, saying they "burst off the screen", and added that Cruz has a charming accent. BBC News film critic Jane Crowther said that "Cruz is wonderfully ditzy as the innocent abroad" but remarked that "it's Harold Perrineau Jr as Monica who pockets the movie". Annlee Ellingson of Box Office magazine wrote "Cruz is stunning in the role—innocent and vulnerable yet possessing a mature grace and determined strength, all while sizzling with unchecked sensuality." Also in 2000, she played Alejandra Villarreal, who is Matt Damon's love interest in Billy Bob Thornton's film adaptation of the western bestselling novel All the Pretty Horses. Susan Stark of The Detroit News commented that in the film Thornton was able to guide Damon, Henry Thomas and Cruz to "their most impressive performances in a major movie yet". However, Bob Longigo of The Atlanta Journal-Constitution was less enthusiastic about Cruz's and Damon's performance, saying that their "resulting onscreen chemistry would hardly warm a can of beans".

=== 2001–2005: Breakthrough ===
2001 marked a turning point year when Cruz starred in the feature films Vanilla Sky and Blow. In Vanilla Sky, Cameron Crowe's interpretation of Open Your Eyes, she played Sofia Serrano, the love interest of Tom Cruise's character. The film received mixed reviews, but made $200 million worldwide. Her performance was well received by critics, with BBC film critic Brandon Graydon saying that Cruz "is an enchanting screen presence", and Ethan Alter of the Film Journal International noting that Cruz and her co-star Cruise were "able to generate some actual chemistry". Her next film was Blow, adapted from Bruce Porter's 1993 book Blow: How a Small Town Boy Made $100 million with the Medellín Cocaine Cartel and Lost It All. She had a supporting role as Mirtha Jung, the wife of Johnny Depp's character. The film received mixed reviews, but made $80 million worldwide. Nina Willdorf of the Boston Phoenix described Cruz as "multi-talented" and Mark Salvo of The Austin Chronicle wrote "I may be one of the last male holdouts to join the Cruz-Rules camp, but her tour de force performance here sucks you right in."

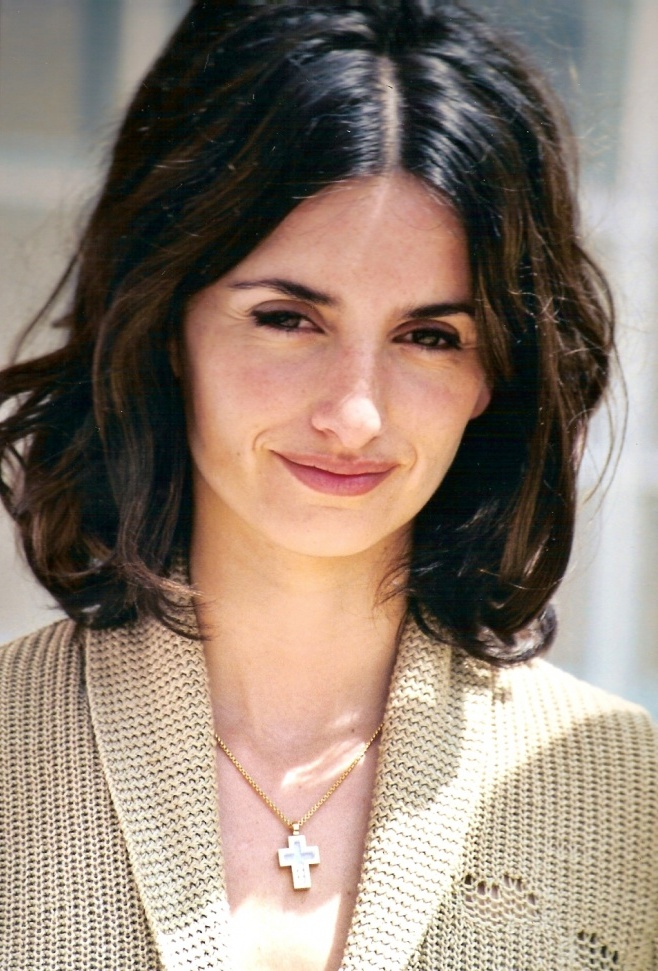
Cruz at the 2003 Cannes Film Festival

In 2001, she also appeared in Don't Tempt Me, playing Carmen Ramos. The film received negative reviews. Jeff Vice of the Deseret News commented that "unfortunately, casting Cruz as a tough girl is a hilariously bad [idea]" and Michael Miller of the Village Voice writing that "as Satan's helper Carmen, Penélope Cruz doesn't hold a candle to her cocaine-huffing enabler in Blow". Cruz's last film in 2001 was Captain Corelli's Mandolin, film adaption of the novel of the same name. She played Pelagia, who falls in love with another man while her fiancé is in battle during the Second World War. Captain Corelli's Mandolin was not well received by critics, but made $62 million worldwide. In 2002, she had a minor role in Waking Up in Reno. It had negative reviews and was a box office failure. The following year, Cruz had a supporting role in the horror film Gothika as Chloe Sava, a patient at a mental hospital. David Rooney of Variety wrote that Cruz "adds a serviceably malevolent edge to Chloe's apparent madness". Cruz's performance in Fanfan la Tulipe, also in 2003, was not well received, Peter Bradshaw of The Guardian commenting that Cruz "deserves a special Cannes Razzie for a performance of purest teak".

In 2004, Cruz appeared in the Christmas film Noel as Nina, the girlfriend of Paul Walker's character and as Mia in the 1930s set romantic drama Head in the Clouds, set in the 1930s. Bruce Birkland of Jam! Canoe wrote, "The story feels forced and the performances dreary, with the notable exception of Cruz, who seems to be in a different film from the rest of the cast." Desson Thompson of The Washington Post was more critical; his comment about the character's "pronounced limp" was that "Cruz (hardly the world's greatest actress) can't even perform without looking fake". The film performed poorly at the box office. She also starred in Sergio Castellitto's melodrama Don't Move, competing with Sabrina Impacciatore for the leading role Cruz, who learned Italian for the role, won the David di Donatello for her performance. She also won the European Film Award for Best Actress for the film in 2004.

In 2005, Cruz appeared as Dr. Eva Rojas in the action adventure Sahara. She earned $1.6 million for her supporting role. The film grossed $110 million worldwide but did not recoup its $160 million budget. Moviefone dubbed the film "one of the most famous flops in history" and in 2007, listed it at 24 on its list of "Biggest Box-Office Turkeys of All Time". Lori Hoffman of the Atlantic City Weekly felt Cruz put her "considerable [acting] skills on cruise control as Dr Eva Rojas" and James Berardnelli of ReelViews described Cruz's performance as a "black hole", that she "lacks screen presence". Also in 2005, Cruz appeared in Chromophobia, screened at the 2005 Cannes Film Festival and released the following year. Mathew Turner of View London said Cruz's character Gloria, a cancer-riddled prostitute, is "actually more interesting than the main storyline" while Time Evan's of Sky Movies wrote, "The Cruz/Ifans storyline—featuring the only two remotely sympathetic characters—never really fuses with the main plot." Her final 2005 film was Don't Move playing Italia. Eric Harrison of the Houston Chronicle noted that Cruz "goes all out" with her appearance and Patrick Peters of Empire magazine commented that the film's director, who also appears in the film, was able to draw a "sensitive performance" from Cruz.

=== 2006–2009: Worldwide recognition ===
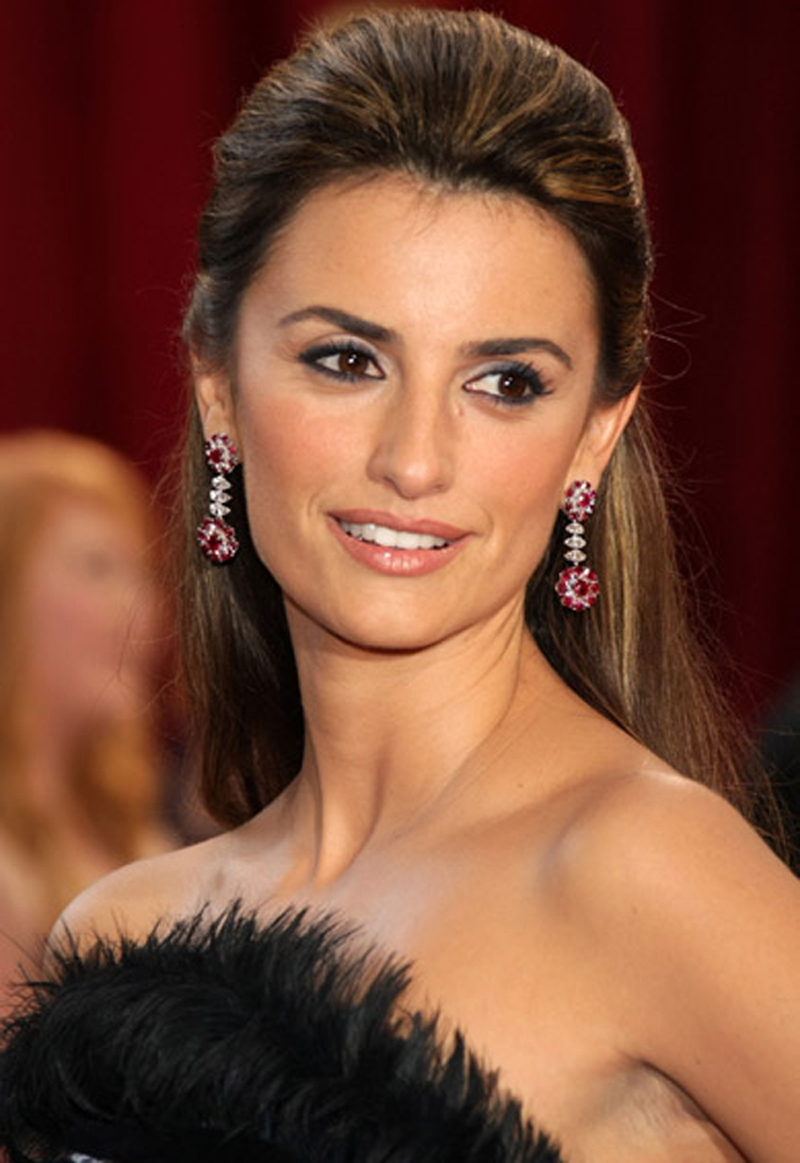
Cruz at the 80th Academy Awards in 2008

Cruz appeared alongside her good friend Salma Hayek in the 2006 Western comedy film Bandidas. Randy Cordova of The Arizona Republic said the film "sports" Cruz and her co-star Salma Hayek as the "lusty dream team" and that they were the "marketing fantasy" for the film. Also in 2006, Cruz received favourable reviews for her performance as Raimunda, a working-class woman forced to go to great lengths to protect her 14-year-old daughter Paula, in Pedro Almodóvar's Volver. A.O. Scott of The New York Times remarked, "With this role Ms. Cruz inscribes her name near the top of any credible list of present-day flesh-and-blood screen goddesses, in no small part because she manages to be earthy, unpretentious and a little vulgar without shedding an ounce of her natural glamour." Likewise, Carina Chocano of The Los Angeles Times wrote, "Cruz, who has remarked that in Hollywood she's rarely allowed to be anything more than pretty, instills her with an awesome resoluteness and strength of character." She shared a Best Actress award at the 2006 Cannes Film Festival with five of her co-stars, as well as receiving a Goya Award and European Film Award, and was nominated for the Golden Globe, the Screen Actors Guild Award, the BAFTA Award, and the Academy Award for Best Actress in a leading role. With this nomination, Cruz became the first Spanish actress ever nominated for an Academy Award.

In 2007, Cruz appeared in the lead female role in Manolete, a biopic of bullfighter Manuel Laureano Rodríguez Sánchez, playing Antoñita "Lupe" Sino. The film was critically panned, and Variety felt that Cruz has "clearly been cast to play the kind of red-hot drama queen she's pulled off infinitely better in the films of Pedro Almodovar". After being shelved since 2007, Manolete (originally shot in 2005) released on demand via cable, satellite, telco and online on 7 June 2011 under the title A Matador's Mistress. She also appeared in The Good Night, playing two characters, Anna and Melody. TV Guide film critic Maitland McDonagh noted that in the film Cruz "expertly mines the contrast between chic, compliant, white-clad Anna and funky, street-wise Melody, who treats [Martin Freeman's character] Gary like the world-class drag he is".

In 2008, Cruz starred alongside Ben Kingsley in Isabel Coixet's film Elegy, which was based on the Philip Roth story The Dying Animal, as the lead female role, Consuela Castillo. Ray Bennett of The Hollywood Reporter described Cruz's performance as being "outstanding in an otherwise lame male fantasy [film]". That same year, Cruz appeared in Woody Allen's Vicky Cristina Barcelona as María Elena, a mentally unstable woman, which was received with critical acclaim. Writing for the San Francisco Chronicle, Mick LaSalle noted, "But the revelation is Penélope Cruz, who has never been better in an American film. Suddenly, and for the first time, her stardom makes sense. As Maria Elena, José Antonio's gifted and neurotic ex-wife, Cruz is on fire – hysterically funny, abandoned, passionate, poignant, with a performance full of shading and wide in range. She's as fun and as powerful as Anna Magnani, and beautiful besides. Cruz just needed somebody to turn her loose." Likewise, Peter Bradshaw of The Guardian singled her out for praise, writing: "Cruz, playing Maria Elena, the passionate and crazy ex-wife of a moody Picasso-ish artist, looks as if she has wandered in from a more hefty film entirely; everything she does and says seems to mean more, count for more. This isn't to say that she gets bigger laughs, or perhaps any laughs, but she certainly walks off with the film". Cruz received a Goya Award and her first Academy Award and BAFTA Award for Best Supporting Actress. She also received a Golden Globe and SAG nomination. With her Oscar win, Cruz became the first, and to date only, Spanish actress to ever be awarded an Academy Award, as well as the sixth Hispanic performer to have received the award.

Cruz's next film was the kid-friendly G-Force, voicing a guinea pig spy named Juarez. G-Force was a commercial success, making over $290 million worldwide. Also in 2009, she appeared in the film Broken Embraces as Lena. Stephanie Zacharek of Salon.com noted in her review for the film that Cruz "doesn't coast on her beauty in Broken Embraces, and she has the kind of role that can be difficult to flesh out". Cruz received nominations from the Satellite Awards and European Film Awards for her performance in Broken Embraces. Cruz's final 2009 film was the film version of the musical Nine, playing the character Carla Albanese, the lead character's mistress. Variety reported that Cruz originally auditioned for the role of the film within a film's star, Claudia, which eventually went to Nicole Kidman. Cruz said that she trained for three months for the dance routine in the film. Claudia Puig of USA Today commented that while Cruz "does a steamy song and dance", her "acting is strangely caricatured". Cruz's performance as Carla was nominated for Best Supporting Actress at the Academy Awards, Golden Globes, and SAG Awards.

=== 2010–2015: Established actress ===
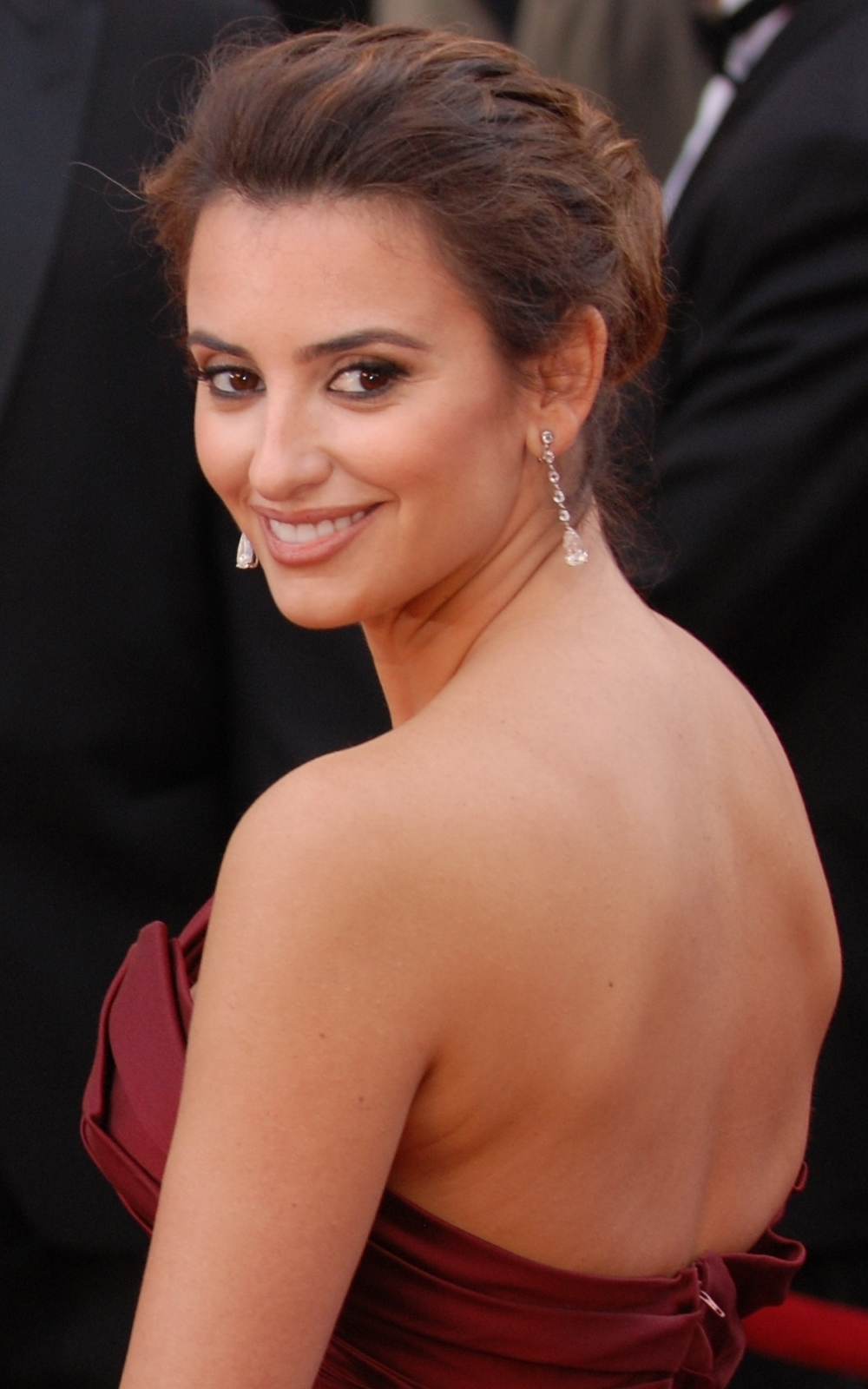
Cruz at the 82nd Academy Awards in 2010, where she received her third Academy Award nomination

Cruz's only film in 2010 was Sex and the City 2, the sequel to the 2008 film, in which she appeared as a banker in a cameo role. A commercial success, the comedy film was largely panned by critics. Cruz appeared in her biggest Hollywood turn to date in Rob Marshall's Pirates of the Caribbean: On Stranger Tides, the fourth installment of the film series, opposite Johnny Depp. In the film, Cruz portrayed Angelica, a former love interest of Jack Sparrow, who blames him for her corruption. Cruz was the only actress considered for the role, as she fit Marshall's description. He invited her for the role as they wrapped the production of Nine. The actress spent two months working out and learning fencing for the role. During filming, Cruz discovered she was pregnant, leading the costume department to redesign her wardrobe to be more elastic, and the producers to hire her sister Mónica Cruz to double for Penélope in risky scenes. On Stranger Tides ranks among the highest-grossing films of all time, grossing more than $1.046 billion in box-office receipts worldwide. On 1 April 2011, prior to the film's release, Cruz received the 2,436th star on the Hollywood Walk of Fame in front of the El Capitan Theatre. She became the first Spanish actress to receive a Star.

In 2012, Cruz appeared in the first ever Nintendo commercial to promote New Super Mario Bros. 2 and the Nintendo 3DS XL in which she played the role of Mario in the ad. She spoke Italian again, this time in Woody Allen's romantic ensemble comedy film To Rome with Love, in which she portrayed a street-smart prostitute who agrees to pretend to be the wife of a newlywed. Fond to work with her again, Allen compared Cruz's play in the film with that of Italian icons Anna Magnani and Sophia Loren. While the film received mixed reviews, Cruz was reviewed favourably for her "exuberantly, cartoonishly sexy" performance, which The Week cited as a stand out. The same year, Cruz also reunited with Italian director Sergio Castellitto in his war tale Twice Born about an infertile Italian woman who returns to relive her past in Sarajevo. An adaptation of Castellitto's wife Margaret Mazzantini's same-titled bestseller, Cruz portrayed the transitional character at different phases in her life, ranging from her early twenties to her late forties. Despite receiving little praise from critics, Cruz's performance opposite Emile Hirsch earned positive reviews.

In 2013, Cruz appeared in Ridley Scott's The Counselor, featuring an ensemble cast consisting of Michael Fassbender, Cameron Diaz, Brad Pitt, and husband Javier Bardem. The crime thriller follows a lawyer who, tempted by the lure of quick money, finds himself involved in drug dealing with ruthless Mexican cartels. Cruz plays his girlfriend, Laura, the only innocent character in the story. The film received mostly negative reviews from critics and became a moderate commercial success at the international box offices. The same year, Cruz, along with Antonio Banderas, made a cameo appearance in Pedro Almodóvar's farcical comedy I'm So Excited, which marked a return to the director's light, campy comedies of the 1980s and 1990s. The film received mixed reviews, but earned a worldwide gross of more than US$11 million.

In 2015, Cruz co-produced and starred in the Spanish drama film Ma Ma, directed by Julio Medem. In it, she plays Magda, a gutsy mother and unemployed teacher, who is diagnosed with breast cancer, a role which Cruz later cited as "one of the most complex, beautiful characters I've ever been offered, the most difficult." The melodrama was screened in the Special Presentations section of the 2015 Toronto International Film Festival, where it received generally negative reviews for its weepie story line. However, Cruz was praised for her "aces performance", which earned her an eighth Goya nomination at the 30th awards ceremony.

=== 2016–present ===
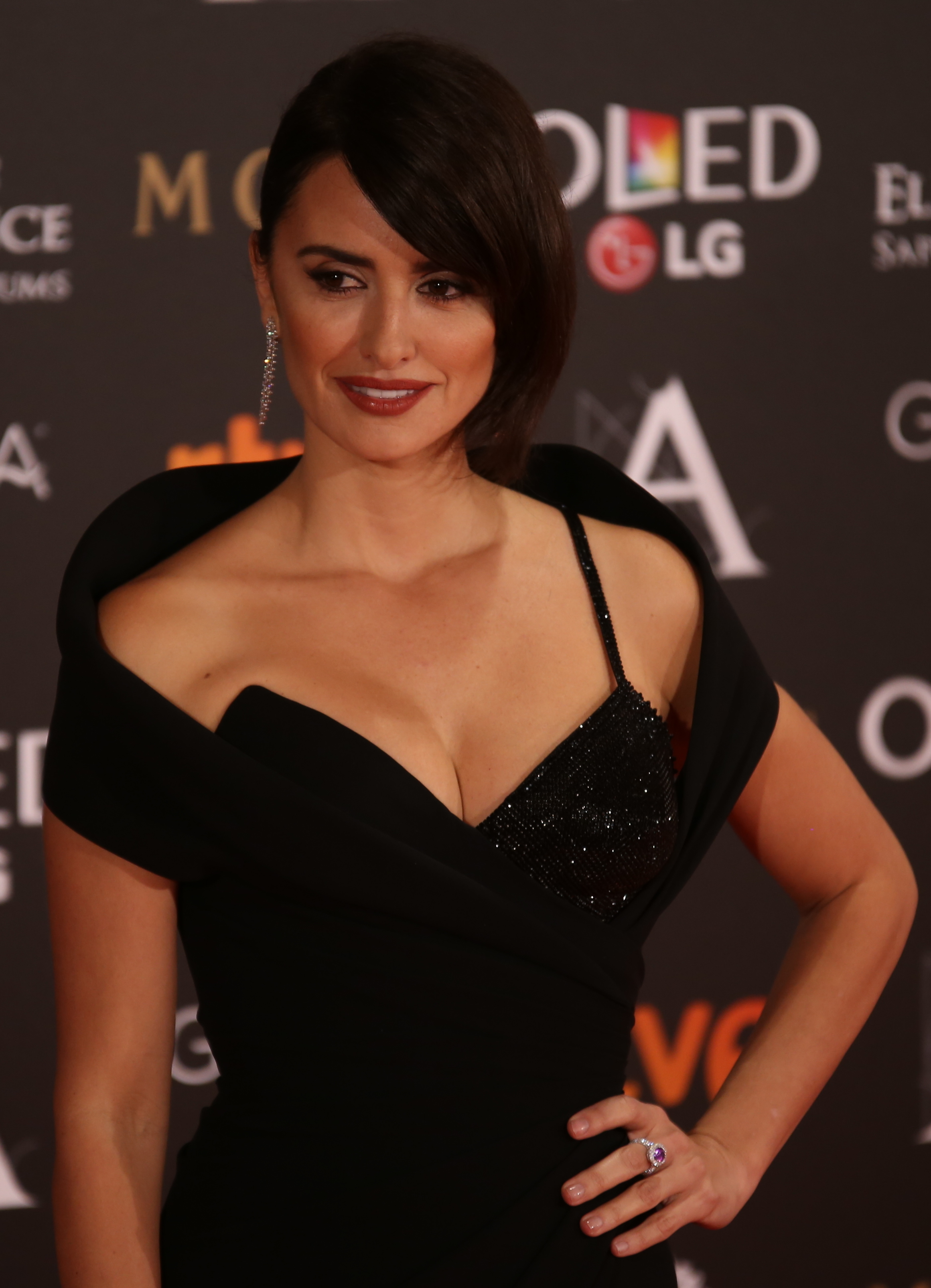
Cruz at the 2017 Goya Awards

Cruz's first film of 2016 was the American comedy Zoolander 2, co-starring and directed by Ben Stiller. In the sequel film, Cruz portrayed a secret Interpol agent who enlists models Derek Zoolander (Stiller) and Hansel McDonald, played by Owen Wilson, to help find out who is killing the world's most beautiful people. Specifically written for her persona, Cruz, a fan of the original 2001 film, was one of the first actors to be cast in their parts. Upon its release, the film received generally negative reviews from critics, who felt that it had "more celebrity cameos than laughs." Cruz's other film that year was Louis Leterrier's British spy comedy Grimsby, in which she played a powerful philanthropist, opposite Sacha Baron Cohen and Mark Strong. Cruz was reportedly offered $400,000 for her role. The film received mixed reviews, with critics suggesting that Cruz was highly underused and "looking even less invested here than she did in Zoolander 2". Also in 2016, Cruz rejoined Fernando Trueba on his Spanish-language period pic The Queen of Spain, a sequel to Trueba's 1998 drama The Girl of Your Dreams. Set in the 1950s, twenty years after the events of the original, Cruz reprised the role of an actress who becomes a Hollywood star and returns to Spain to film a blockbuster about Queen Isabella I of Castile. Selected to be shown in the Berlinale Special section of the 67th Berlin International Film Festival, the Spanish comedy drama was screened to lukewarm reviews, but received five nominations at the 31st Goya Awards, earning Cruz her ninth nomination.

Loving Pablo, a Spanish drama film directed by Fernando León de Aranoa was released in 2017, starring Cruz in the role of Virginia Vallejo, and her husband, Javier Bardem, in the role of Pablo Escobar. Based on Vallejo's bestselling memoir Loving Pablo, Hating Escobar, the film was launched to mixed reviews during the 74th Venice International Film Festival. In order to play the role of the Colombian journalist, Cruz studied hundreds of interviews of Vallejo. Cruz had a supporting role in Kenneth Branagh's mystery film Murder on the Orient Express (2017), the fourth adaptation of Agatha Christie's 1934 novel of the same name. The mystery–drama ensemble film follows world-renowned detective Hercule Poirot, who seeks to solve a murder on the famous European train in the 1930s. Cruz plays missionary and passenger Pilar Estravados, a Hispanic version of the novel's Swedish Greta Ohlsson. The film was a financial success but received mixed to positive reviews from critics, with praise for the cast's performances, but criticism for not adding anything new to previous adaptations. In 2018, Cruz made her television debut by co-starring in the role of Donatella Versace in the second season of the FX anthology series American Crime Story entitled The Assassination of Gianni Versace. Her performance was highly praised by critics and she received a Primetime Emmy Award nomination for Outstanding Supporting Actress in a Limited Series or Movie. In addition, Cruz reteamed with Bardem on the Spanish-language psychological thriller film Everybody Knows, directed by Asghar Farhadi. The film opened the 2018 Cannes Film Festival to positive reviews. Justin Chang of The Los Angeles Times praised the performances from the two leads writing, "Bardem and Cruz have such a natural, unforced chemistry".

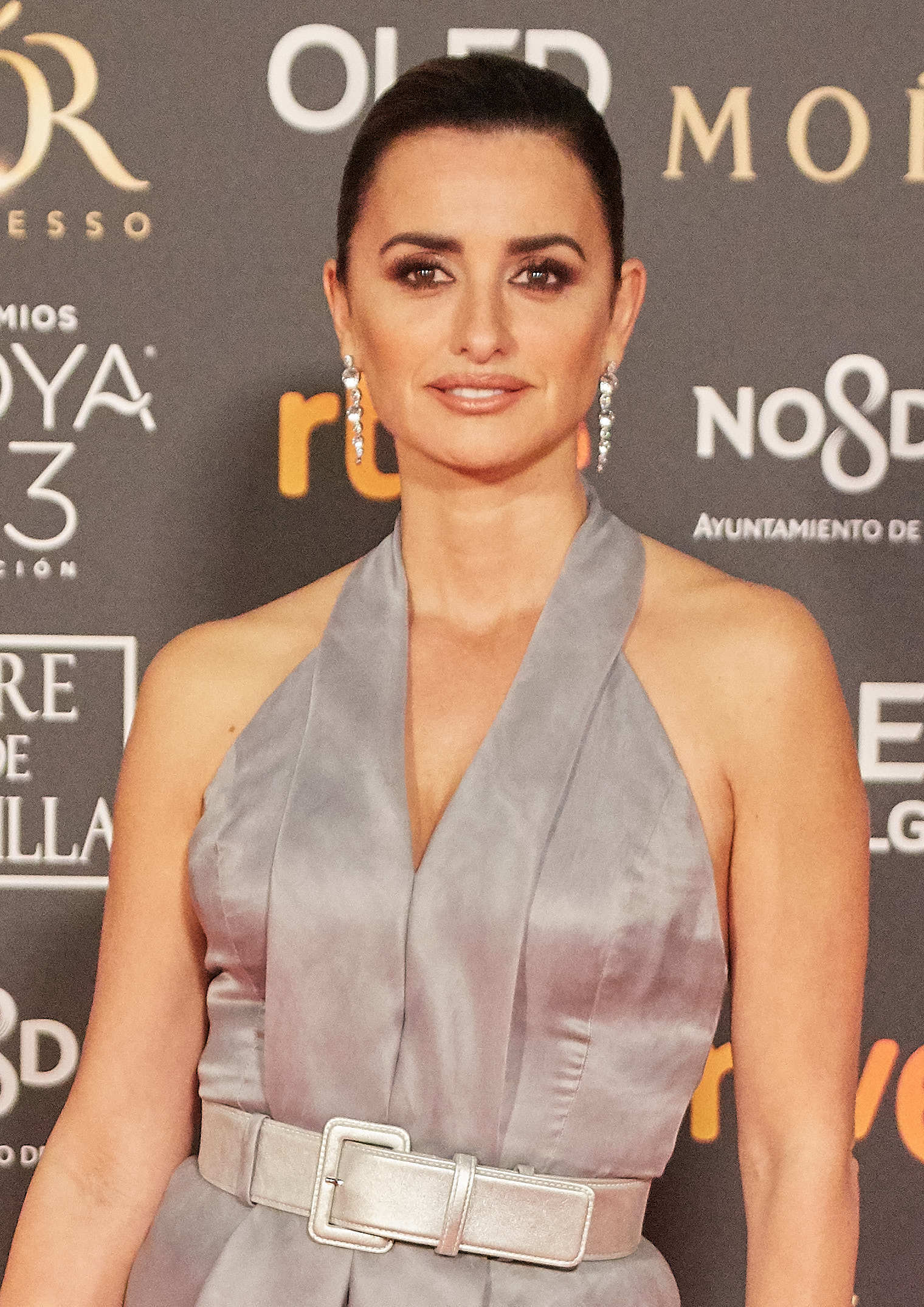
Cruz at the 2019 Goya Awards

In 2021, Cruz starred alongside Antonio Banderas in Gastón Duprat & Mariano Cohn's film Official Competition and reunited with Almodóvar for the film Parallel Mothers, in which she played Janis, a professional photographer entangled in a relationship with a married man, leading to an affair and resulting in her pregnancy. Both films premiered at the 78th Venice International Film Festival, where the latter received rave reviews. Parallel Mothers also screened at the 59th New York Film Festival, where it was received positively. Her performance in the film was lauded, winning the Volpi Cup for Best Actress and receiving her second Academy Award nomination for Best Actress, her fourth nomination overall. Stephanie Zacharek from Time stated that "Cruz is astonishing here, in what may be the best performance of her career so far. Janis' fragility and her fortitude are two sides of one coin, and Cruz can shift from one to the other in the merest breath." Owen Gleiberman of Variety mentioned that "Cruz acts this part with a mood-shifting immediacy that leaves you breathless", with David Rooney of The Hollywood Reporter describing her performance as "one of the best roles of her career" and "her most outstanding work since Volver." Following the release of these films, she was honoured at the Museum of Modern Art in New York for her career and achievements in film. Luxury fashion house Chanel returned as the presenting sponsor making for an in-sync affair, as Cruz has served as ambassador for the brand since 2018.

The following year, she appeared in the female-led spy action film The 355, directed by Simon Kinberg and starring alongside Jessica Chastain, Lupita Nyongo, Diane Kruger, Fan Bingbing, Sebastian Stan, and Édgar Ramírez. The film was released by Universal Pictures on 7 January 2022. Also in 2022, Cruz acted in Emanuele Crialese's Italian drama film L'immensità and Juan Diego Botto's Spanish thriller On the Fringe the later of which she also served as a producer. Guy Lodge of Variety praised her performance in L'immensità writing, "If it was through the lens of Pedro Almodóvar that Cruz really established herself as her generation's stand-in for Sophia Loren, Crialese takes the likeness one step further, planting the Spaniard in Loren's hometown of Rome, as the kind of beautifully wounded housewife that the Italian icon perfected in the films of Crialese's youth." She portrayed Laura, Enzo Ferrari's wife, alongside Adam Driver and Shailene Woodley in the biopic Ferrari (2023), directed by Michael Mann. The film chronicled the life of Enzo Ferrari, founder of the Ferrari brand.

In 2023, Cruz became a brand ambassador for Emirates appearing in advertisements for the airline, as well as Geox. As a part of a collaboration with performer Residente and Sílvia Pérez Cruz on the track "313", Cruz won a Latin Grammy Award for Best Short Form Music Video in 2024.

During the 2025 Cannes Film Festival, Cruz was reported to have landed a role in Javier Calvo and Javier Ambrossi's La bola negra, a film about three gay men at different times, due to begin filming in August 2025. Ambrossi stated that they had written Cruz's role specifically for her. In the film, that premiered at the 2026 Cannes Film Festival, she portrayed a cupletista named Nené Romero performing one of the musical numbers of the film. In 2026, for her first big screen appearance after Ferrari, Cruz co-starred in the comedy-drama The Invite, playing a psychotherapist and sexologist. Also in early 2026, she was reported to have sign on to lead a then untitled comedy film by Nancy Meyers angling for a 2027 Christmas release.

In November 2026, Cruz was announced as the lead as well as producer (through her company Moonlyon) of Patricia, the sophomore film by Juan Diego Botto dealing with violence against women.

== Public image ==
"The most difficult thing in the world is to start a career known only for your looks, and then to try to become a serious actress. No one will take you seriously once you are known as the pretty woman."

In 2006, Cruz became a spokesmodel for French cosmetics company L'Oréal to promote products such as the L'Oréal Paris hair dye Natural Match and L'Oreal mascara products. She receives $2 million a year for her work for the company. Cruz has appeared in print ads for Mango and had a contract with Ralph Lauren in 2001. Cruz and her sister designed their second collection for Mango in 2007. It was inspired by Brigitte Bardot and summers in Saint-Tropez.

Cruz ranked as No. 58 in Maxim's "Hot 100" of 2007 list, and was chosen by Empire magazine as being one of the 100 Sexiest Movie Stars in the world. Cruz was also ranked on Askmen.com's Most Desirable Women of 2008 at No. 26, in 2009 at No. 25, and in 2010 at No. 7. In April 2010, she replaced Kate Winslet as the new face and ambassador of Lancôme's Trésor fragrance. Lancôme signed Cruz as their third superstar spokesmodel, along with Julia Roberts and Winslet. The campaign was shot by Mario Testino at Paris's Hotel de Crillon and debuted in the autumn of 2010.

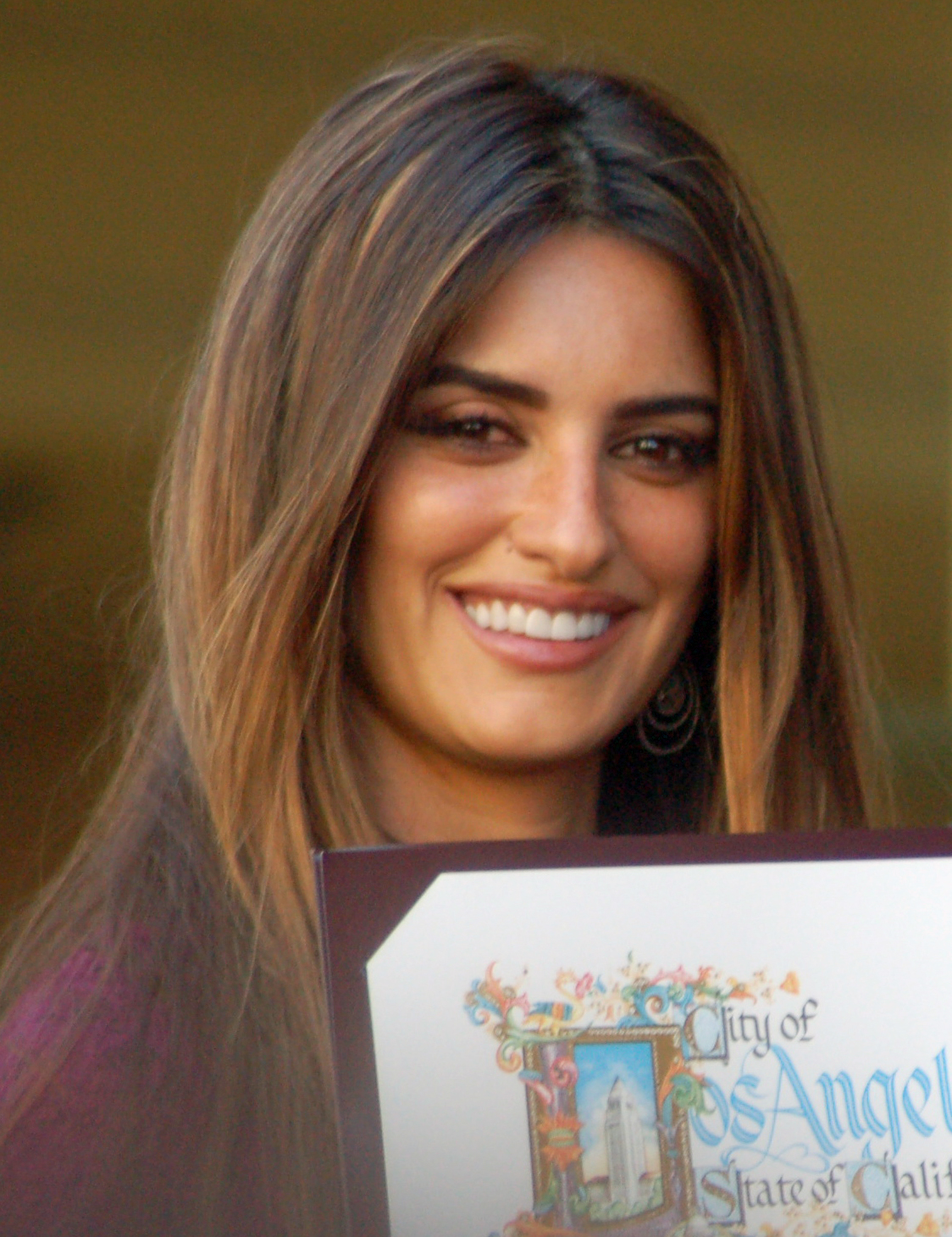
Cruz receiving a star on the Hollywood Walk of Fame in 2011

In 2010, Cruz was a guest editor for the French Vogue magazine, focusing on larger-size models in a provocative photo shoot. Almodóvar described her as his muse. On the cover of Spanish Vogue's December 2010 issue, she agreed to be photographed by fashion photographer Peter Lindbergh only if her pregnancy was not shown. In 2011, The Telegraph reported the most sought after body parts of the rich and famous revealed by two Hollywood plastic surgeons who carried out a survey among their patients to build up the picture of the perfect woman. Under the category of the most sought after body shape, Cruz, known for her voluptuous figure, was voted as having the top body. Men's Health ranked her at No. 32. on their "100 Hottest Women of All-Time" list. Esquire named her the Sexiest Woman Alive in 2014. In May 2023, she was appointed as the brand ambassador for the airline Emirates.

== Philanthropy ==
Cruz has donated money and time to charity. In addition to work in Nepal, she has volunteered in Uganda and India, where she spent a week working with Mother Teresa that included assisting in a leprosy clinic. That trip inspired Cruz to help start a foundation to support homeless girls in India, where she sponsors two young women. She donated her salary from her first Hollywood film, The Hi-Lo Country, to Mother Teresa's mission. In the early 2000s, she spent time in Nepal photographing Tibetan children for an exhibition attended by the Dalai Lama. She also photographed residents at the Pacific Lodge Boys' Home, most of whom are former gang members and recovering substance abusers. She said: "These kids break my heart. I have to control myself not to cry. Not out of pity, but seeing how tricky life is and how hard it is to make the right choices." A pregnant Cruz showed her support for the battle against AIDS by lighting up the Empire State Building with red lights in New York City on 1 December 2010 on International AIDS Day, as part of (RED)'s new awareness campaign, 'An AIDS Free Generation is Due in 2015,' which aims to eradicate the HIV virus from pregnant mothers to their babies. In 2012 and 2018, she posed for ads supporting PETA's anti-fur campaign.

== Personal life ==
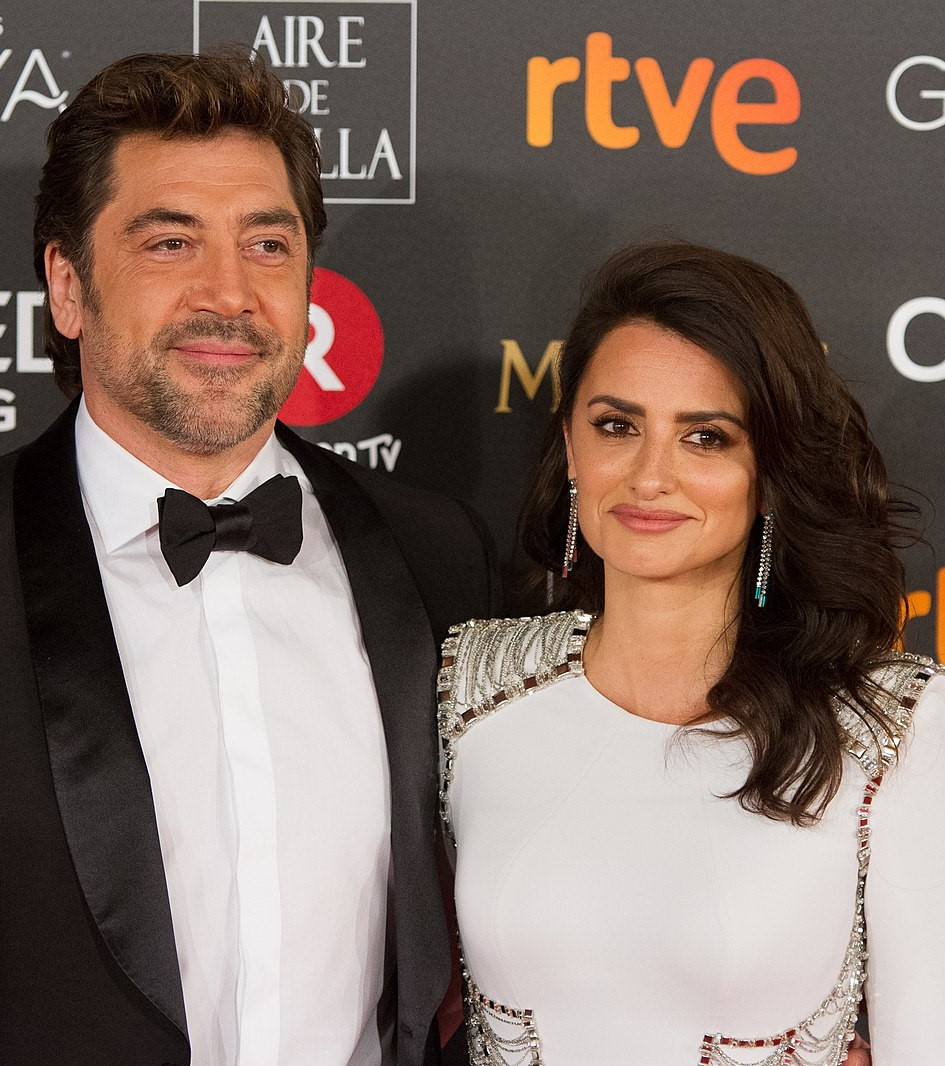
Cruz and her husband Javier Bardem at the 32nd Goya Awards in 2018

Cruz is married to Spanish actor Javier Bardem. They met on the set of Jamón jamón (1992), and started dating in 2007 after reuniting for Vicky Cristina Barcelona (2008). They married in early July 2010 in a private ceremony at a friend's home in the Bahamas. They have a son who was born in January 2011 in Los Angeles, and a daughter who was born in July 2013 in Madrid. Cruz became an advocate of breastfeeding in public following the birth of her children.

Cruz had a relationship with Tom Cruise after they appeared together in Vanilla Sky (2001), until January 2004. In June 2003, she settled a defamation lawsuit against Australian magazine New Idea over an article it published about her relationship with Cruise; the publication had to apologise, pay her legal costs, and donate AU$5,000 (US$3,200) to her nominated charity.

Cruz owns a clothing store in Madrid, and designed jewelry and handbags with her younger sister Mónica for a company in Japan.

Raised Catholic, Cruz said in 2017 that the philosophy or religion she feels closest to is Buddhism.

== Acting credits and accolades ==
Cruz has been recognised by the Academy of Motion Picture Arts and Sciences for the following performances:

- 79th Academy Awards: Best Actress, nomination, for Volver (2006)
- 81st Academy Awards: Best Supporting Actress, win, Vicky Cristina Barcelona (2008)
- 82nd Academy Awards: Best Supporting Actress, nomination, Nine (2009)
- 94th Academy Awards: Best Actress, nomination, Parallel Mothers (2021)

On October 18, 2025, Cruz received the Academy Museum of Motion Pictures Icon Award "for an artist whose career has had a significant global cultural impact." She is the only Spanish actress to have won an Academy Award and to have received a star on the Hollywood Walk of Fame. In 2007 she won the David di Donatello for the leading role in Don't Move.

She has also received nominations for two British Academy Film Awards, four Golden Globe Awards, a Primetime Emmy Award, five Screen Actors Guild Awards, and fourteen Goya Awards. In 2006 she received the Cannes Film Festival Award for Best Actress for Volver, and in 2021 the Venice International Film Festival's Volpi Cup for Best Actress for Parallel Mothers.
