= Platino Award for Best Supporting Actress =

Spanish film award

- Country: Ibero-America
- Presented by: Entidad de Gestión de Derechos de los Productores Audiovisuales (EGEDA), Federación Iberoamericana de Productores Cinematográficos y Audiovisuales (FIPCA)
- Currently held by: Camila Plaáte for Belén (2026)
- Website: premiosplatino.com

The Platino Award for Best Supporting Actress (Spanish: Premio Platino a la mejor actriz de reparto/Premio Platino a la mejor interpretación femenina de reparto) is one of the Platino Awards, Ibero-America's film awards presented annually by the Entidad de Gestión de Derechos de los Productores Audiovisuales (EGEDA) and the Federación Iberoamericana de Productores Cinematográficos y Audiovisuales (FIPCA).

== History ==
It was first presented in 2021, with Spanish actress Nathalie Poza being the first recipient, for her role as Violeta in Rosa's Wedding. Prior to that, supporting female performances were included in the Best Actress category.

No actress has won the award for than once. Conversely, Argentine actress Alejandra Flechner is the only actress to receive multiple nominations in the category, with two consecutive ones. As of 2025, all five winners have been Spanish actresses in Spanish productions.

In the list below the winner of the award for each year is shown first, followed by the other nominees.

== Winners and nominees ==
=== 2020s ===
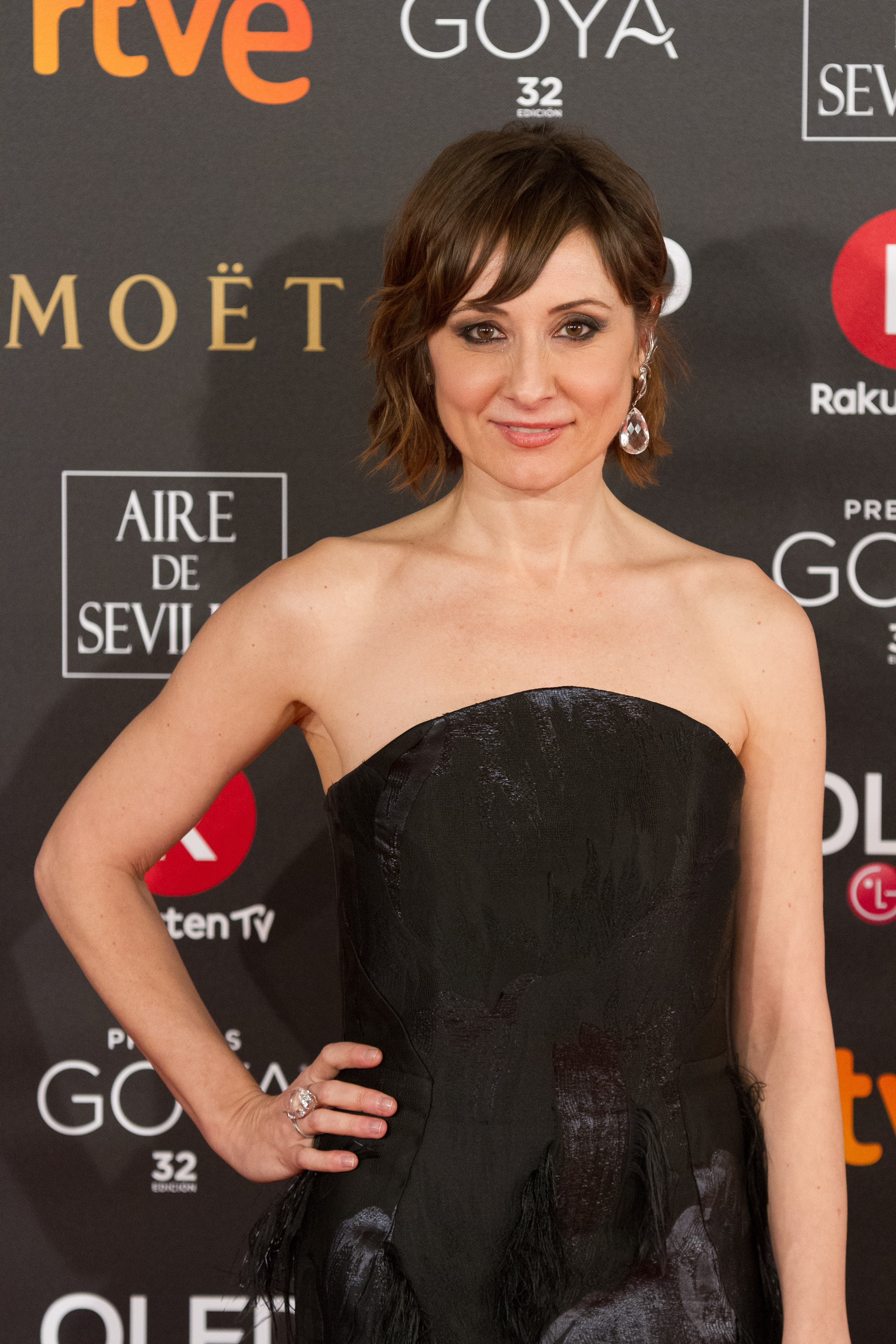
Nathalie Poza, the first recipient of the award.

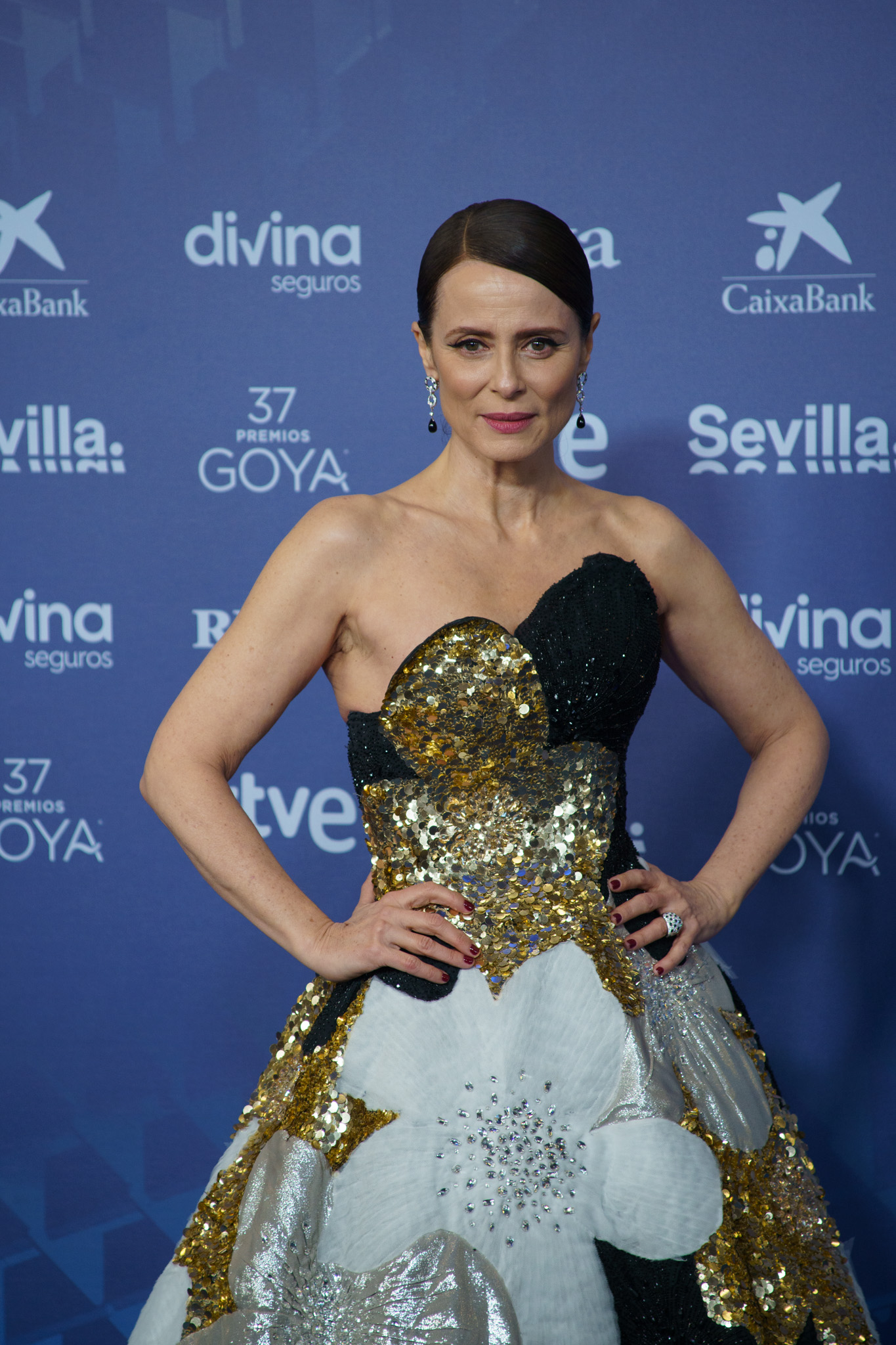
2022 winner Aitana Sánchez-Gijón.

Year	Actor	Role(s)	English title	Original title
2021 (8th)	(Spain) Nathalie Poza	Violeta	Rosa's Wedding	La boda de Rosa
2021 (8th)	(Argentina) Yanina Ávila	Gladys Pereyra	The Crimes That Bind	Crímenes de familia
2021 (8th)	(Colombia) Kami Zea	Marta	Forgotten We'll Be	El olvido que seremos
2021 (8th)	(Guatemala) Sabrina de la Hoz	Natalia	La Llorona	
2022 (9th)	(Spain) Aitana Sánchez-Gijón	Teresa Ferreras	Parallel Mothers	Madres paralelas
2022 (9th)	(Mexico) Ana Cristina Ordoñez González	Ana (child)	Prayers for the Stolen	Noche de fuego
2022 (9th)	(Spain) Milena Smit	Ana Manso Ferreras	Parallel Mothers	Madres paralelas
2022 (9th)	(Spain) Almudena Amor	Liliana	The Good Boss	El buen patrón
2023 (10th)	(Spain) Susi Sánchez	Begoña	Lullaby	Cinco lobitos
2023 (10th)	(Argentina) Alejandra Flechner	Silvia Strassera	Argentina, 1985	
2023 (10th)	(Spain) Carmen Machi	Asun	Piggy	Cerdita
2023 (10th)	(Spain) Penélope Cruz	Azucena	On the Fringe	En los márgenes
2024 (11th)	(Spain) Ane Gabarain	Lourdes	20,000 Species of Bees	20.000 especies de abejas
2024 (11th)	(Argentina) Alejandra Flechner	Doris	Puan	
2024 (11th)	(Spain) Ana Torrent	Ana Arenas	Close Your Eyes	Cerrar los ojos
2024 (11th)	(Chile) Antonia Zegers	Jacinta	El conde	
2025 (12th)	(Spain) Clara Segura	Carmen	The 47	El 47
2025 (12th)	(Chile) Francisca Lewin	María Carolina Geel	In Her Place	El lugar de la otra
2025 (12th)	(Mexico) Ilse Salas	Susana San Juan	Pedro Páramo	
2025 (12th)	(Costa Rica) Liliana Biamonte	Mother	Memories of a Burning Body	Memorias de un cuerpo que arde
2026 (13th)	(Argentina) Camila Plaáte	Julieta	Belén	
2026 (13th)	(Brazil) Dira Paes	Aretha	Manas	
2026 (13th)	(Argentina) Julieta Cardinali	Beatriz Camaño	Belén	
2026 (13th)	(Spain) Nagore Aranburu	Madre priora Isabel	Sundays	Los domingos

== See also ==
- Ariel Award for Best Supporting Actress
- Goya Award for Best Supporting Actress
