= Katryna =

Name list

Katryna is a feminine given name variant of Katrina. Notable people with the name include:

- Katryna Esposito (born 2000), Maltese judoka
- Katryna Gaither (born 1975), American basketball player
- Katryna Nields, American musical artist
