= Katrina Bayonas =

English actor's agent and film producer

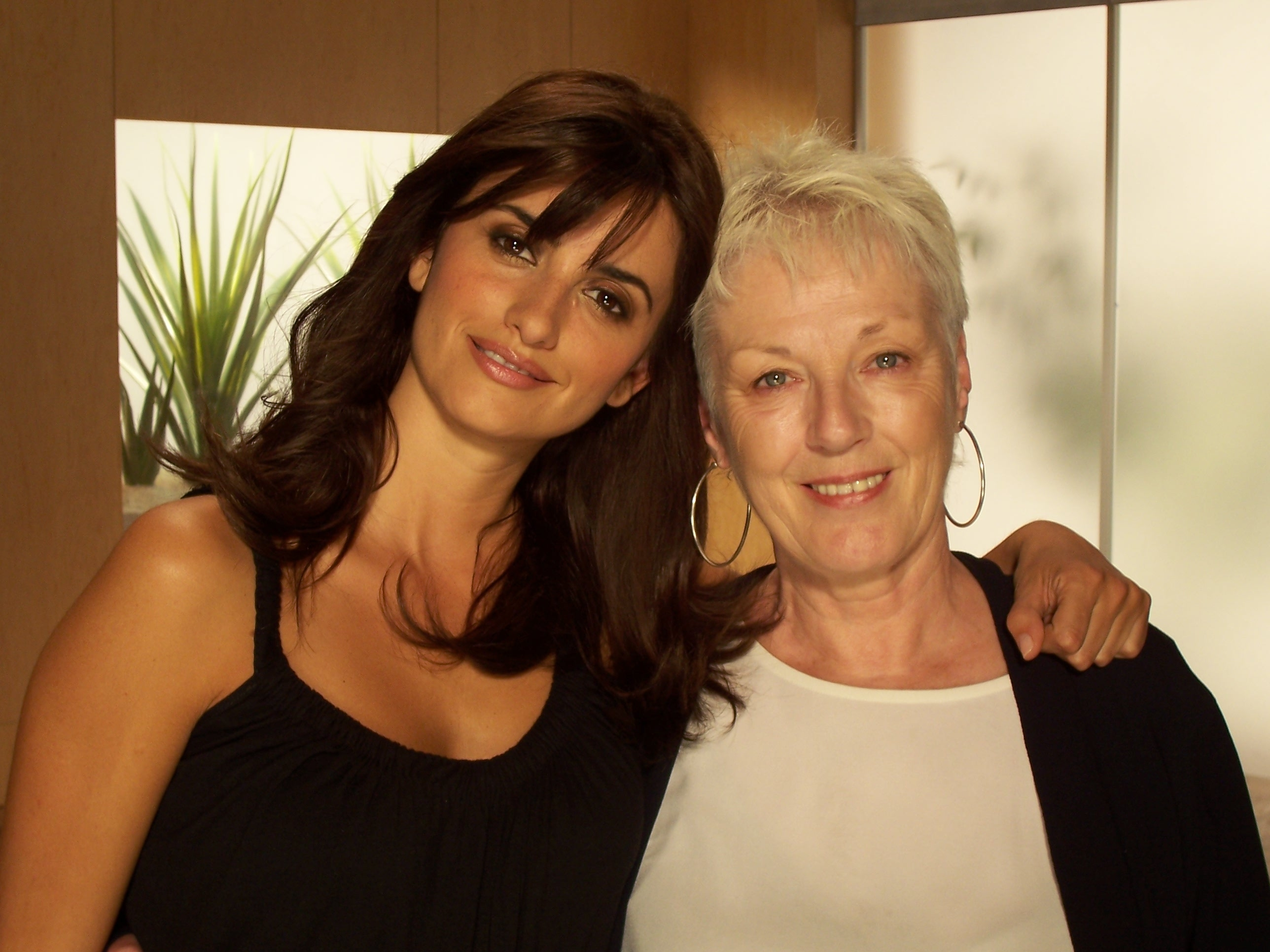
- Katrina Bayonas with Penélope Cruz in the Kuranda offices 2011
- Born: February 6, 1941 (age 85); Hereford, England, United Kingdom
- Occupations: Talent Manager; Casting Director; Film Producer

Katrina Bayonas (born 1941) is an English actors' agent, film producer and casting director based in Spain. She is best known for discovering Penélope Cruz and managing her career. Bayonas' annual New Faces program has also been responsible for launching the careers of such actors as Jordi Mollá, Elena Anaya, Alicia Borrachero, Alberto Ammann and Najwa Nimri since its creation in 1988.

Born in Hereford, England, Katrina is the daughter of British Casting Director James Liggat who worked with Stanley Kubrick in feature films like The Shining, A Clockwork Orange, and Barry Lyndon. She moved to Spain at age 20.

Among Katrina's film credits as Casting Director are:The Dancer Upstairs (2002), Queen of Swords (2000), Live Flesh (1997), A Corner of Paradise (1997), Shooting Elizabeth (1997), An Ungentlemanly Act (1992), and The House on Garibaldi Street (1979). She was also involved in casting for Fidel (2002) and Harem (1986).

Bayonas has also produced three films: Wild Tango (1993), El invierno en Lisboa (1991), and The Power Game (1983).

She has also appeared in various television documentaries, such as Penélope, camino a los Oscar (2009) and Cómo conseguir un papel en Hollywood(2007), as well as playing herself in the documentary film Buscando a Penélope (2009).

Her daughter Lorena is an acting coach and stage director.
