= Don Juan (1998 film) =

1998 film by Jacques Weber

- Directed by: Jacques Weber
- Screenplay by: Jacques Weber
- Based on: Dom Juan by Molière
- Produced by: Gérard Jourd'hui
- Starring: Jacques Weber; Michel Boujenah; Penélope Cruz; Emmanuelle Béart
- Cinematography: José Luis Alcaine
- Edited by: Jacques Witta
- Music by: Bruno Coulais
- Distributed by: Alta Films (Spain); BAC Films (France)
- Release date: 18 March 1998 (France)
- Running time: 104 minutes
- Countries: Spain; France; Germany
- Language: French

Don Juan is a 1998 French-language film written and directed by Jacques Weber, starring Weber himself, alongside Michel Boujenah, Penélope Cruz, and Emmanuelle Béart. The screenplay is based on the play Dom Juan by Molière.

== Synopsis ==
Spain in the mid-seventeenth century. A series of bloody wars has ravaged the nation. Don Juan the nobleman and his servants Sganarelle and La Violette roam the countryside on horseback, pursued by the brothers Alonse and Carlos, who seek revenge for the insult to the honor of their sister, Donna Elvire. Don Juan seduces two young women, Mathurine and Charlotte, who fight with each other to win his heart. In the end, Don Juan meets with his father and mother and repents for his past sins.

== Cast ==
- Jacques Weber as Don Juan
- Michel Boujenah as Sganarelle
- Emmanuelle Béart as Elvire
- Penélope Cruz as Mathurine
- Ariadna Gil as Charlotte
- Denis Lavant as Pierrot
- Michael Lonsdale as Don Luis
- Jacques Frantz as Don Alonse
- Pierre Gérard as Carlos
- Arnaud Bedouët as La Violette
- Philippe Khorsand as Monsieur Dimanche
- Lucas Uranga as Gossiper
- Pedro Casablanc as Lucas
- Claudia Gravy as Don Juan's Mother
- Xavier Thiam as La Ramée

== Awards and nominations ==
- César Awards (France)
  - Nominated: Best Costume Design (Sylvie de Segonzac)
