= Katrina Hertzer =

American nurse during World War I

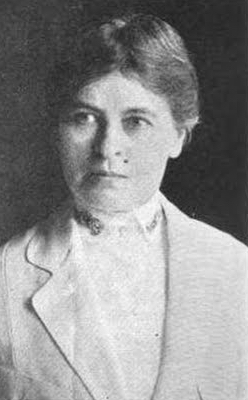
- Katrina Hertzer, from a 1921 publication.
- Born: Katrina Elisabeth Hertzer; February 23, 1873; Tiffin, Ohio, US
- Died: February 12, 1960 (aged 86); Madeira Beach, Florida, US
- Occupation: nurse
- Known for: Chief Nurse of the United States Navy Nurse Corps during World War I

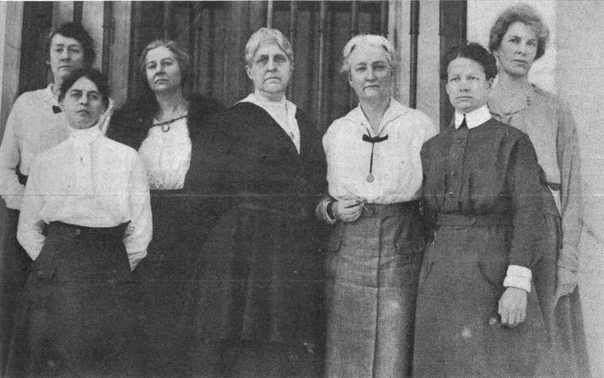
Red Cross Executives (1918); Katrina Hertzer is second from left.

Katrina Hertzer (February 23, 1873 — February 12, 1960) was an American nurse during World War I, serving as Chief Nurse of the United States Navy Nurse Corps.

== Early life ==
Katrina Elisabeth Hertzer was born in Tiffin, Ohio, and trained at the Illinois Training School for Nurses in Chicago, graduating in the class of 1904.

== Career ==
Hertzer was superintendent of nurses at a hospitals in Boone, Iowa, and Saint Paul, Minnesota, early in her career. She joined the U. S. Navy Nurse Corps in 1911. In 1912, Hertzer was transferred from the naval hospital in Norfolk, Virginia to one at Chelsea, Massachusetts, where she started as acting Chief Nurse and was officially promoted to Chief Nurse soon after.

Hertzer was a member of the American Red Cross's Mercy Ship expedition in 1914, serving in Budapest with Helen Scott Hay and Josephine Beatrice Bowman. "Serbs, Albanians, Hungarians, Croatians, Austrians, Montenegrins, and Russians began their long journey from the front on stretchers, ox-carts and hay wagons to the nearest railroad, where hospital trains brought them filthy, hungry, exhausted to us," she wrote of that work. She also worked with prisoners of war in Siberia.

In 1916, she was named Chief Nurse of the United States Navy Nurse Corps during World War I, stationed at American Red Cross headquarters in Washington D.C. She was the Navy Nurse Corps' liaison, to work with Jane Delano on nurse recruitment during wartime. In 1921 her work with the American Red Cross ended.

== Personal life ==
Katrina Hertzer died at a veterans' hospital in Madeira Beach, Florida, in 1960, aged 86 years. Her gravesite is at Arlington National Cemetery, as "Kathrina Elizabeth Hertzer".
