= Girl of Your Dreams (disambiguation) =

Girl of Your Dreams is a 1996 album by Bobbie Cryner, or its title track.

Girl of Your Dreams may also refer to:

- The Girl of Your Dreams (film), a 1998 film directed by Fernando Trueba
- The Girl of Your Dreams (album), a 2026 studio album by Ashe
- "Girl of Your Dreams", a song by Trixie Mattel from the Blonde & Pink Albums, 2022
