= Official Competition =

2021 film by Gastón Duprat and Mariano Cohn

- Theatrical release poster
- Spanish: Competencia oficial
- Directed by: Gastón Duprat; Mariano Cohn
- Written by: Mariano Cohn; Andrés Duprat; Gastón Duprat
- Produced by: Jaume Roures
- Starring: Penélope Cruz; Antonio Banderas; Oscar Martínez; José Luis Gómez; Irene Escolar; Manolo Solo; Nagore Aranburu; Pilar Castro; Koldo Olabarri
- Cinematography: Arnau Valls Colomer
- Edited by: Alberto del Campo
- Production company: The Mediapro Studio
- Distributed by: Buena Vista International (Spain); Star Distribution (Argentina)
- Release dates: 4 September 2021 (Venice); 25 February 2022 (Spain); 17 March 2022 (Argentina)
- Running time: 114 minutes
- Countries: Spain; Argentina
- Language: Spanish
- Box office: $4.7 million

Official Competition (Spanish: Competencia oficial) is a 2021 Spanish-language black comedy-drama film directed by Gastón Duprat and Mariano Cohn, from a screenplay by Duprat, Cohn and Andrés Duprat. It stars Penélope Cruz, Antonio Banderas and Oscar Martínez.

== Plot ==
On his 80th birthday, Humberto Suárez, an ageing multi-millionaire, wonders about his legacy and considers financing the construction of a bridge. Instead, he decides to finance a film so that people will look fondly upon his legacy. He selects the reclusive Palme d'Or laureate Lola Cuevas to be the director, with the screenplay being adapted from a Nobel Prize-winning novel titled Rivalry about a man who is unable to forgive his brother for killing their parents in a drunk-driving incident. The two brothers are to be played by acclaimed stage actor Iván Torres and celebrity actor Félix Rivero; Iván is a method actor who has extensively prepared his character's past, while Félix is a more mainstream Hollywood actor who finds Iván's methods pointless.

Lola proves herself to be a highly eccentric director who makes extensive notes and requires increasingly bizarre exercises of her actors, such as forcing them to repeat single lines or words until she believes they are convincing enough, refusing to show up at rehearsals, and at one point dangling a large (fake) boulder over the heads of Iván and Félix via a crane to emulate the tension of the scene they are rehearsing. One session involves Iván and Félix being tied to chairs and forced to watch as Lola crushes their various awards in an industrial shredder, including a handmade one that was given to Iván by disabled students at a school where he once taught.

One day during rehearsals, Félix tells Lola and Iván that he has been diagnosed with pancreatic cancer and is on palliative care, hoping that Rivalry will be his final masterpiece. Iván privately suggests to Lola that he could double up in order to play both brothers if Félix ends up unable to complete the project. Felix later confesses to them both that his diagnosis was a lie that he used in order to prove to the pair that he could fool them with his acting. Iván commends his performance and tells him that he believes Félix to be a better actor than he is, before revealing that this too was a lie as payback.

Eventually, they reach the final scene of the film, where Félix's character murders Iván's and takes over his brother's life. At a party held by Humberto to commemorate the film starting shooting, Félix overhears Iván describe him as the worst actor he has ever worked with. Félix confronts him on a mezzanine floor within the building. Iván attempts to punch Félix who dodges the blow, causing Ivan to fall from the mezzanine level to a hard floor below. He looks dead but has been rendered comatose. Iván's wife, assuming that he must have jumped, is comforted by Félix. Lola seems to recognize that Félix is merely acting.

There is a montage of what everyone ends up doing next. The film proceeds to shooting, with both roles played by Félix. At a post-screening Q&A, Lola bluntly denies any perceived meaning that the critics read into her film and gives one-word answers. In the final scenes narrated by Lola who directly addresses the audience, Suárez decides to finance a bridge, Félix returns to Hollywood projects and Iván wakes from his coma and curses Félix's name.

== Cast ==
- Penélope Cruz as Lola Cuevas
- Antonio Banderas as Félix Rivero
- Oscar Martínez as Iván Torres
- José Luis Gómez as Humberto Suárez
- Manolo Solo as Matías
- Nagore Aranburu as Julia
- Irene Escolar as Diana Suárez
- Pilar Castro as Violeta
- Koldo Olabarri as Darío
- Juan Grandinetti as Ariel

== Production ==
In January 2020 casting was announced featuring Antonio Banderas, Penélope Cruz, Oscar Martínez, Pilar Castro, Irene Escolar, Carlos Hipólito, José Luis Gómez, Nagore Aranburu, Koldo Olabarri and Juan Grandinetti with Gastón Duprat & Mariano Cohn directing from a screenplay penned alongside Andrés Duprat. Cruz and Banderas had only shared onscreen time before during two minutes of Pedro Almodóvar's 2013 film I'm So Excited!.

The film was produced by The Mediapro Studio, with the participation of RTVE, TV3, and Orange España.

Principal photography began in February 2020. In March 2020, production was halted due to the COVID-19 pandemic. Shooting resumed in September 2020 and the wrap was announced in October 2020. Filming took place in the Spanish cities of Madrid, San Lorenzo de El Escorial and Ávila.

== Release ==
Official Competition had its world premiere at the 78th Venice International Film Festival on 4 September 2021. It also screened at the Toronto International Film Festival in mid-September 2021. Buena Vista International released the film in Spain on 25 February 2022. Protagonist Pictures handled the international distribution rights.

Star Distribution (formerly known as the Latin American branch of Buena Vista International) acquired distribution rights for Latin America. In the case of Argentina, the film was released on 17 March 2022. IFC Films purchased the theatrical release rights for the United States.

== Reception ==
On the review aggregator Rotten Tomatoes, 96% of 156 reviews are positive, with an average rating of 7.5/10. The website's critics consensus reads, "Its premise may resonate most with hardcore film fans, but Official Competition's tight focus and sharp humor have a universal appeal." Metacritic, which uses a weighted average, assigned the film a score of 79 out of 100, based on 33 critics, indicating "generally favorable" reviews.

At the 2021 Cinéfest Sudbury International Film Festival, it won the award for Outstanding International Feature. At the 2021 Vancouver International Film Festival, it won the Audience Award for most popular film in the Galas and Special Presentations program.

== Accolades ==
Year	Award	Category	Nominee(s)	Result	Ref.
2022	30th Actors and Actresses Union Awards	Best Actress in an International Production	Penélope Cruz	Nominated	
2023	10th Feroz Awards	Best Comedy Film		Won	
2023	37th Goya Awards	Best Cinematography	Arnau Valls Colomer	Nominated	
2023	10th Platino Awards	Best Ibero-American Comedy Film		Won	

== See also ==
- List of Spanish films of 2022
