= Parallel Mothers =

2021 film by Pedro Almodóvar

- Theatrical release poster
- Spanish: Madres paralelas
- Directed by: Pedro Almodóvar
- Written by: Pedro Almodóvar
- Produced by: Agustín Almodóvar
- Starring: Penélope Cruz; Milena Smit; Israel Elejalde; Aitana Sánchez-Gijón; Rossy de Palma; Julieta Serrano
- Cinematography: José Luis Alcaine
- Edited by: Teresa Font
- Music by: Alberto Iglesias
- Production companies: El Deseo; Remotamente Films AIE
- Distributed by: Sony Pictures Entertainment Iberia
- Release dates: 1 September 2021 (Venice); 8 October 2021 (Spain)
- Running time: 122 minutes
- Country: Spain
- Language: Spanish
- Box office: $23.1 million

Parallel Mothers (Spanish: Madres paralelas) is a 2021 Spanish drama film written and directed by Pedro Almodóvar. The film centers on Janis, played by Penélope Cruz, and Ana (Milena Smit), who give birth on the same day in a hospital. Their lives become intertwined when Janis learns a shocking truth about her daughter's biological heritage. As the film explores their evolving relationships with their children, it also reflects on Spain's unresolved history, particularly the painful legacy of the civil war and the search for missing bodies. Israel Elejalde, Aitana Sánchez-Gijón, Rossy de Palma, and Julieta Serrano co-star.

The film had its premiere on 1 September 2021 as the opening film of the 78th Venice International Film Festival, where Cruz was awarded the Volpi Cup for Best Actress. It was released theatrically in Spain on 8 October 2021 by Sony Pictures Releasing International, and was the closing film of the 2021 New York Film Festival on the same day. At the 94th Academy Awards, the film received two nominations: Best Actress (Cruz) and Best Original Score (Iglesias).

== Plot ==
Photographer Janis Martínez does a photo shoot with renowned forensic anthropologist Arturo, who is working with a group to try to find and identify victims of Fascist executions during and after the Civil War. She asks him if his foundation will help excavate a known mass grave in her home village, where her great-grandfather and other men from the village were killed and buried during the White Terror, a period of political repression by Franco following the Spanish Civil War. Arturo agrees to review the case with his foundation.

He and Janis are attracted to each other and sleep together; Janis becomes pregnant. She decides to keep the baby and raise it alone, against Arturo's wishes. He feels he must support his wife, who is undergoing chemotherapy, but he wants to be with Janis.

Janis later shares a hospital room with Ana, a teen single mother; they give birth at the same time. After both babies are held for evaluation, they are released, and Janis and Ana go their separate ways. Janis and Ana stay in touch, keeping one another updated on their babies' progress.

Arturo arrives one day asking to see baby Cecilia; he reacts strangely, saying that he does not believe the baby is his. Janis does a maternity test, which reveals that she is not Cecilia's biological mother, but she decides not to tell anyone. She sacks her au pair.

Months later, Janis runs into Ana working at a cafe near her home; Ana has left her mother's home after her mother went on the road to pursue acting (although she hired a nanny for Ana). Janis invites Ana to her apartment, where Ana tearfully reveals that her baby Anita had suffered a crib death. Janis asks for a photo of Anita, which confirms her suspicions that their babies were mistakenly swapped in the hospital.

Janis later offers Ana a job as a live-in maid, watching over the house and baby Cecilia. She collects saliva samples from the two of them without telling Ana they are for a maternity test, the results of which confirm that Cecilia is Ana's daughter. Ana later reveals that her pregnancy was the result of a gang rape by her classmates, and her father pressured her into staying silent to avoid negative press attention. The budding relationship between Janis and Ana develops into a sexual relationship, but Janis is unable to commit fully to Ana, who wants more from her.

Arturo arrives with news that his foundation has approved the excavation of the mass grave, and also that his wife has recovered from cancer and they are separating. He and Janis celebrate with a night out on the town, making Ana jealous. Ana's mother also comes by to reconnect with Ana, admitting to Janis that she feels like a terrible mother, but that she wanted so badly to pursue her dream as an actress.

Janis finally admits the truth about the babies to Ana, who reacts angrily and leaves in the night with Cecilia, to Janis' dismay. She calls Arturo and breaks the news to him as well; he spends the night with her, as they console each other. The next morning, Ana calls Janis, having calmed down, and says that Janis is still welcome to see Cecilia and be a part of her life.

Months later, Janis and Arturo travel to her home village, where he gathers information about the grave from surviving relatives and prepares for the excavation with his team.

Ana later arrives with Cecilia. Janis tells her that she is three months pregnant. When asked what she will name the baby, Janis says 'Ana' if it is a girl and 'Antonio" (after her great-grandfather) if it is a boy.

The excavation is a success, as the remains are found and identified. The villagers gather at the exhumed grave to honor their lost relatives. Now they can be properly buried in family plots at the cemetery.

== Cast ==
- Penélope Cruz as Janis Martínez Moreno
- Milena Smit as Ana Manso Ferreras
- Israel Elejalde as Arturo
- Aitana Sánchez-Gijón as Teresa Ferreras
- Rossy de Palma as Elena
- Julieta Serrano as Brígida
- Carmen Flores as Dolores
- Ainhoa Santamaría as babysitter
- Adelfa Calvo as Brígida's niece
- Daniela Santiago as model
- Ana Peleteiro as model
- Pedro Casablanc as the voice of Ana's father

== Production ==
In February 2021, it was announced that Pedro Almodóvar was ready to direct his new film, entitled Madres paralelas, with a cast headed by Penélope Cruz, Israel Elejalde, Julieta Serrano, and Rossy de Palma. On 12 March, it was reported that he intended to integrate Anya Taylor-Joy into the main cast, but she did not end up appearing in the film.

Principal photography began on 12 March 2021 in Madrid, and concluded on 22 April. Shooting locations included Madrid, Torrelaguna, and Torremocha de Jarama. Produced by El Deseo and Remotamente Films AIE with the support of RTVE and Netflix, Parallel Mothers also received funding from the ICAA.

== Release ==
On 4 February 2021, Pathé acquired the UK distribution rights to the film, and, on 23 April 2021, Sony Pictures Classics acquired its North American, Australian, and New Zealand distribution rights. The film had its world premiere at the 78th Venice International Film Festival on 1 September 2021. Distributed by Sony Pictures Entertainment Iberia, it was intended to be theatrically released in Spain on 10 September 2021, but was postponed to 8 October. It was released in the United States on 24 December 2021. In the United Kingdom, it was released theatrically on 28 January 2022, and was the first film released under Pathé's new term deal with Warner Bros. Pictures, along with The Duke, after their distribution agreement with Disney expired on 30 June 2021.

The film's theatrical release poster, featuring a lactating nipple, was removed from Instagram due to its rules regarding nudity. The decision was criticized by the "free the nipple" movement, leading to an apology from Instagram.

Netflix acquired the exclusive distribution rights to Parallel Mothers for the Latin-American region, aiming for an early 2022 release, even if theatrical openings were not ruled out at the time of the announcement. In Argentina, the film premiered in select theatres on 3 February 2022, fifteen days prior to streaming.

== Themes ==
Prior to making this film, Almodóvar had typically avoided the Spanish Civil War as subject matter for his films. In his own words, "It was as though Franco never existed." One exception was a brief moment in Live Flesh (1997), in which a young prostitute (also played by Cruz) gives birth on the day in 1970 (December 4, 1970) that Spain announced a state of exception further limiting citizens' rights. In contrast, the script for Parallel Mothers speaks explicitly of the need to confront Spain's past, with Almodóvar saying: "I speak through the voice of Penelope [Cruz]... She's speaking the truth about Spain," whereas Ana's resistance to examining that past is "almost like a cliché narrative for the right wing, which reveals that Ana is coming from a very conservative background." An earlier draft of the script overtly gave Ana a background in the conservative Catholic group Opus Dei.

== Reception ==
=== Critical response ===
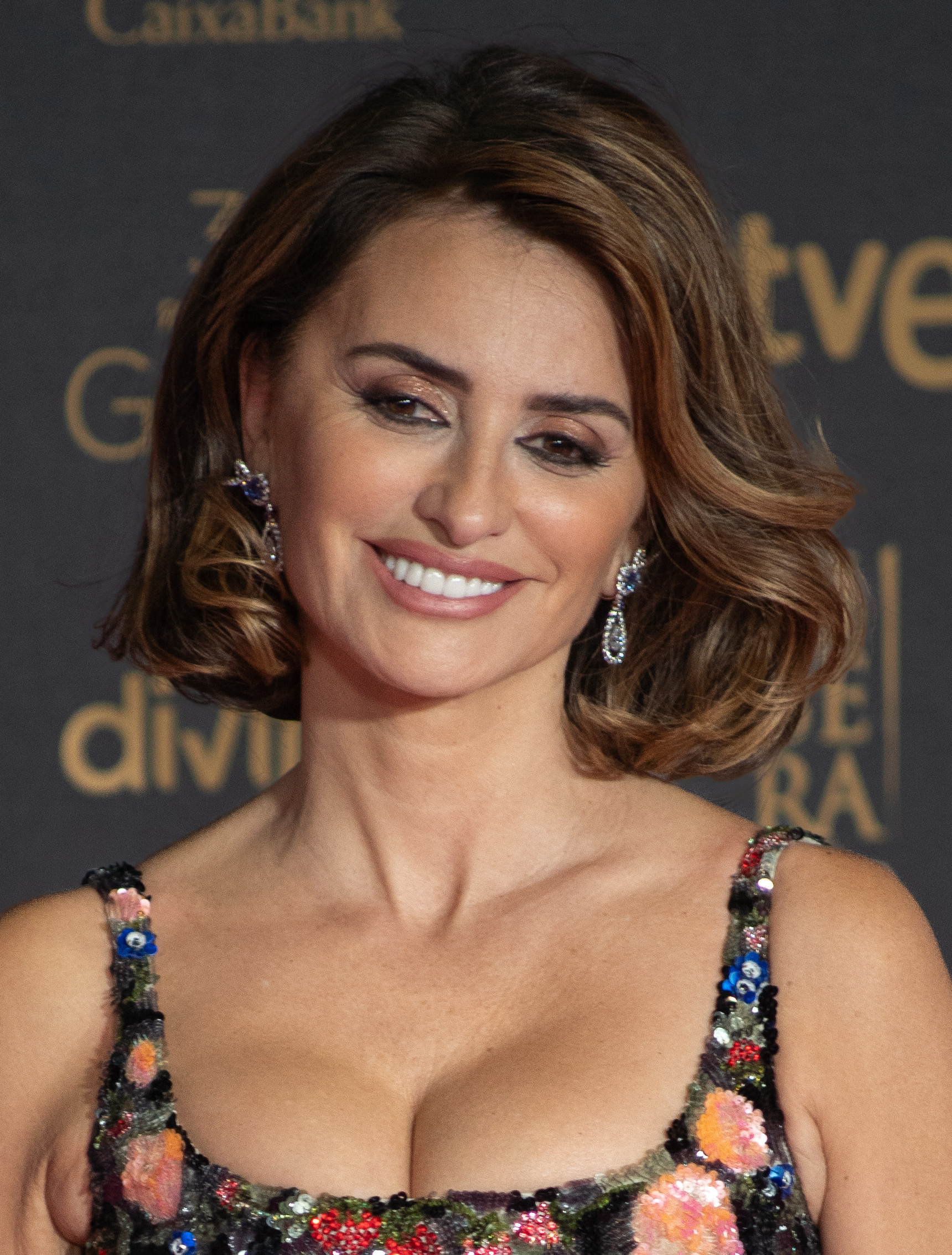
Penélope Cruz won the Volpi Cup for Best Actress for her performance in the film.

At its opening night world premiere, the film received a nine-minute standing ovation from Venice Film Festival attendees in the Sala Grande. It was submitted to be the Spanish entry to the 94th Academy Awards alongside Mediterraneo: The Law of the Sea and The Good Boss, but the latter film was the final official selection.

On the review aggregator website Rotten Tomatoes, 96% of 232 critics' reviews are positive, with an average rating of 8.1/10. The website's consensus reads: "A brilliant forum for Penélope Cruz's talent, Parallel Mothers reaffirms the familiar pleasures of Almodóvar's filmmaking while proving he's still capable of growth." Metacritic, which uses a weighted average, assigned the film a score of 88 out of 100, based on 46 critics, indicating "universal acclaim".

Filmmaker and playwright Florian Zeller praised the film, saying: "They are mothers, sisters or daughters, and with his incredible talent as a writer, which places his characters at the heart of his scenarios, Pedro Almodóvar builds complex emotional stories, missed appointments and intertwined destinies."

=== Top ten lists ===
The film appeared on many film critics' top ten lists for 2021.

Rank	Critic	Publication	Ref.
4th	David Rooney	The Hollywood Reporter	
4th	Ty Burr	—N/a	
5th	Stephanie Zacharek	The Times	
6th	Lovia Gyarkye	The Hollywood Reporter	
6th	Justin Chang	Los Angeles Times	
8th	Carlos Aguilar	RogerEbert.com	
9th	Leah Greenblatt	Entertainment Weekly	
9th	Jason Shawhan	Nashville Scene	
10th	—N/a	Indiewire	
10th	Owen Gleiberman	Variety	

=== Accolades ===
Award	Date of ceremony	Category	Recipient(s)	Result	Ref.
Venice International Film Festival	11 September 2021	Golden Lion	Pedro Almodóvar	Nominated	
Venice International Film Festival	11 September 2021	Queer Lion	Pedro Almodóvar	Nominated	
Venice International Film Festival	11 September 2021	Volpi Cup for Best Actress	Penélope Cruz	Won	
Hollywood Music in Media Awards	17 November 2021	Score - Independent Film (Foreign Language)	Alberto Iglesias	Won	
Forqué Awards	11 December 2021	Best Fiction or Animation Film		Nominated	
Forqué Awards	11 December 2021	Best Film Actress	Penélope Cruz	Nominated	
Forqué Awards	11 December 2021	Cinema and Education in Values		Nominated	
Los Angeles Film Critics Association Awards	18 December 2021	Best Actress	Penélope Cruz	Won	
Los Angeles Film Critics Association Awards	18 December 2021	Best Music/Score	Alberto Iglesias	Won	
National Society of Film Critics Awards	8 January 2022	Best Actress	Penélope Cruz	Won	
National Society of Film Critics Awards	8 January 2022	Best Screenplay	Pedro Almodovar	Runner-up	
Golden Globe Awards	9 January 2022	Best Foreign Language Film	Parallel Mothers	Nominated	
Golden Globe Awards	9 January 2022	Best Original Score	Alberto Iglesias	Nominated	
San Diego Film Critics Society Awards	10 January 2022	Best Actress	Penélope Cruz	Won	
San Diego Film Critics Society Awards	10 January 2022	Best Original Screenplay	Pedro Almodóvar	Nominated	
San Diego Film Critics Society Awards	10 January 2022	Best Foreign Language Film		Won	
San Francisco Bay Area Film Critics Circle Awards	10 January 2022	Best Actress	Penélope Cruz	Nominated	
San Francisco Bay Area Film Critics Circle Awards	10 January 2022	Best Foreign Language Film		Nominated	
Austin Film Critics Association Awards	11 January 2022	Best Actress	Penélope Cruz	Nominated	
Austin Film Critics Association Awards	11 January 2022	Best International Film		Nominated	
Toronto Film Critics Association Awards	16 January 2022	Best Actress	Penélope Cruz	Runner-up	
AACTA International Awards	26 January 2022	Best Actress	Penélope Cruz	Nominated	
Feroz Awards	29 January 2022	Best Drama Film	Agustín Almodóvar, Esther García	Nominated	
Feroz Awards	29 January 2022	Best Director	Pedro Almodóvar	Nominated	
Feroz Awards	29 January 2022	Best Actress in a Film	Penélope Cruz	Nominated	
Feroz Awards	29 January 2022	Best Supporting Actress in a Film	Aitana Sánchez-Gijón	Won	
Feroz Awards	29 January 2022	Best Supporting Actress in a Film	Milena Smit	Nominated	
Feroz Awards	29 January 2022	Best Original Soundtrack	Alberto Iglesias	Won	
Feroz Awards	29 January 2022	Best Trailer	Alberto Leal	Nominated	
Feroz Awards	29 January 2022	Best Poster	Javier Jaén (for the Poster A)	Won	
London Critics' Circle Film Awards	6 February 2022	Actress of the Year	Penélope Cruz	Nominated	
CEC Medals	9 February 2022	Best Film		Nominated	
CEC Medals	9 February 2022	Best Director	Pedro Almodóvar	Nominated	
CEC Medals	9 February 2022	Best Actress	Penélope Cruz	Nominated	
CEC Medals	9 February 2022	Best Supporting Actress	Milena Smit	Nominated	
CEC Medals	9 February 2022	Best Cinematography	José Luis Alcaine	Nominated	
CEC Medals	9 February 2022	Best Score	Alberto Iglesias	Nominated	
Goya Awards	12 February 2022	Best Film	Parallel Mothers	Nominated	
Goya Awards	12 February 2022	Best Director	Pedro Almodóvar	Nominated	
Goya Awards	12 February 2022	Best Actress	Penélope Cruz	Nominated	
Goya Awards	12 February 2022	Best Supporting Actress	Aitana Sánchez-Gijón	Nominated	
Goya Awards	12 February 2022	Best Supporting Actress	Milena Smit	Nominated	
Goya Awards	12 February 2022	Best Cinematography	José Luis Alcaine	Nominated	
Goya Awards	12 February 2022	Best Art Direction	Antxón Gomez	Nominated	
Goya Awards	12 February 2022	Best Sound	Sergio Bürmann, Laia Casanovas, Marc Orts	Nominated	
Houston Film Critics Society Awards	19 February 2022	Best Picture	Parallel Mothers	Nominated	
Houston Film Critics Society Awards	19 February 2022	Best Actress	Penélope Cruz	Nominated	
Houston Film Critics Society Awards	19 February 2022	Best Foreign Language Film	Parallel Mothers	Nominated	
César Awards	25 February 2022	Best Foreign Film	Parallel Mothers	Nominated	
Independent Spirit Awards	6 March 2022	Best International Film	Parallel Mothers	Nominated	
BAFTA Awards	13 March 2022	Best Film Not in the English Language	Parallel Mothers	Nominated	
Actors and Actresses Union Awards	14 March 2022	Best Film Actress in a Leading Role	Penélope Cruz	Nominated	
Actors and Actresses Union Awards	14 March 2022	Best Film Actress in a Secondary Role	Aitana Sánchez-Gijón	Nominated	
Dorian Awards	17 March 2022	Best LGBTQ Film		Nominated	
Dorian Awards	17 March 2022	Best Non-English Language Film		Nominated	
Dorian Awards	17 March 2022	Best Film Performance	Penélope Cruz	Nominated	
Satellite Awards	2 April 2022	Best Actress in a Motion Picture – Drama	Penélope Cruz	Nominated	
Satellite Awards	2 April 2022	Best Original Screenplay	Pedro Almodóvar	Nominated	
Satellite Awards	2 April 2022	Best Original Score	Alberto Iglesias	Nominated	
Academy Awards	27 March 2022	Best Actress	Penélope Cruz	Nominated	
Academy Awards	27 March 2022	Best Original Score	Alberto Iglesias	Nominated	
GLAAD Media Awards	2 April 2022	Outstanding Film – Limited Release	Parallel Mothers	Won	
Fotogramas de Plata	4 April 2022	Best Spanish Film (according to readers)		Won	
Fotogramas de Plata	4 April 2022	Best Film Actress	Penélope Cruz	Won	
Platino Awards	1 May 2022	Best Ibero-American Film		Nominated	
Platino Awards	1 May 2022	Best Director	Pedro Almodóvar	Nominated	
Platino Awards	1 May 2022	Best Original Score	Alberto Iglesias	Won	
Platino Awards	1 May 2022	Best Actress	Penélope Cruz	Nominated	
Platino Awards	1 May 2022	Best Supporting Actress	Aitana Sánchez-Gijón	Won	
Platino Awards	1 May 2022	Best Supporting Actress	Milena Smit	Nominated	
Platino Awards	1 May 2022	Art Direction	Antxón Gómez	Won	
European Film Awards	10 December 2022	Best Actress	Penélope Cruz	Nominated	

== See also ==
- List of Spanish films of 2021
