= Softly from Paris =

French television series (1986–1991)

- Original title: Série rose
- Genre: Anthology; Comedy; Erotica; Drama; Historical fiction Historical romance
- Created by: Pierre Grimblat
- Country of origin: France
- Original language: French
- No. of seasons: 1
- No. of episodes: 26

Production
- Running time: 28 minutes
- Production company: Hamster Productions

Original release
- Network: FR3
- Release: 8 November 1986 – 6 June 1991

Softly from Paris (in French : Série rose) is a 1986–1991 French erotic television series of 28 episodes of 26 minutes each, produced by Pierre Grimblat and initially broadcast on French television channel FR3, from November 8, 1986, to June 6, 1991.

== Plot ==
Softly from Paris is an anthology series loosely adapted from libertine dramas of the European literary canon, written by original authors (underneath their names or a nom de plume) stemming from the 18th century to modernity.

== Episodes ==
List of episodes with main characters and director.

1. La Gageure des trois commères (Jean de La Fontaine – Michel Boisrond)
2. À la feuille de rose, maison turque (Guy de Maupassant – Michel Boisrond)
3. Augustine de Villebranche (Marquis de Sade – Alain Schwartzstein)
4. Une villa à la campagne (Anton Chekhov – Maurice Fasquel)
5. Le Libertin de qualité (Comte de Mirabeau – Juan Luis Buñuel)
6. La Serre (Guy de Maupassant – Harry Kümel)
7. Un traitement justifié (Giovanni Boccaccio – Walerian Borowczyk)
8. Le Demi-mariage ou Le triomphe de la vertu (Nicolas Edme Restif de La Bretonne – Harry Kumel)
9. La Revanche (Guy De Maupassant – Harry Kumel)
10. L'Épreuve de l'amour (Giuseppe Celentano – Alain Schwartzstein)
11. Almanach des adresses des demoiselles de Paris (anonyme 1791 – Walerian Borowczyk)
12. La Dame galante (Pierre de Bourdeille, seigneur de Brantôme – Don Kent)
13. Le Partenaire inattendu (Geoffrey Chaucer – Alain Schwartzstein)
14. La Mandragore (Niccolò Machiavelli and Jean de La Fontaine – Harry Kümel)
15. La Fessée (Marguerite de Navarre – Harry Kümel)
16. L'élève (Nicolas-Edme Rétif – Harry Kümel)
17. Le Signe (Guy de Maupassant – Fred Hilberdink)
18. Hercule aux pieds d'Omphale (Théophile Gautier – Michel Boisrond)
19. Lady Roxanne (Daniel Defoe – Jaime Chávarri)
20. Elle et lui (Marquis de Mirabeau – Jaime Chavarri)
21. La Conversion (Andrea de Nerciat – Christian Faure)
22. Le Lotus d'or (Jin Ping Mei – Walerian Borowczyk)
23. L'Experte Halima (One Thousand and One Nights – Walerian Borowczyk)
24. La Grève de l'amour (Lysistrata d'Aristophane – Nino Monti)
25. Les Leçons de Bucciuolo (Ser Giovanni Fiorentino – Péter Gárdos)
26. Le Style Pompadour (Marquis de Foudras – Michel Boisrond)

== See also ==
- List of French television series
