= Platino Award for Best Actor in a Miniseries or TV series =

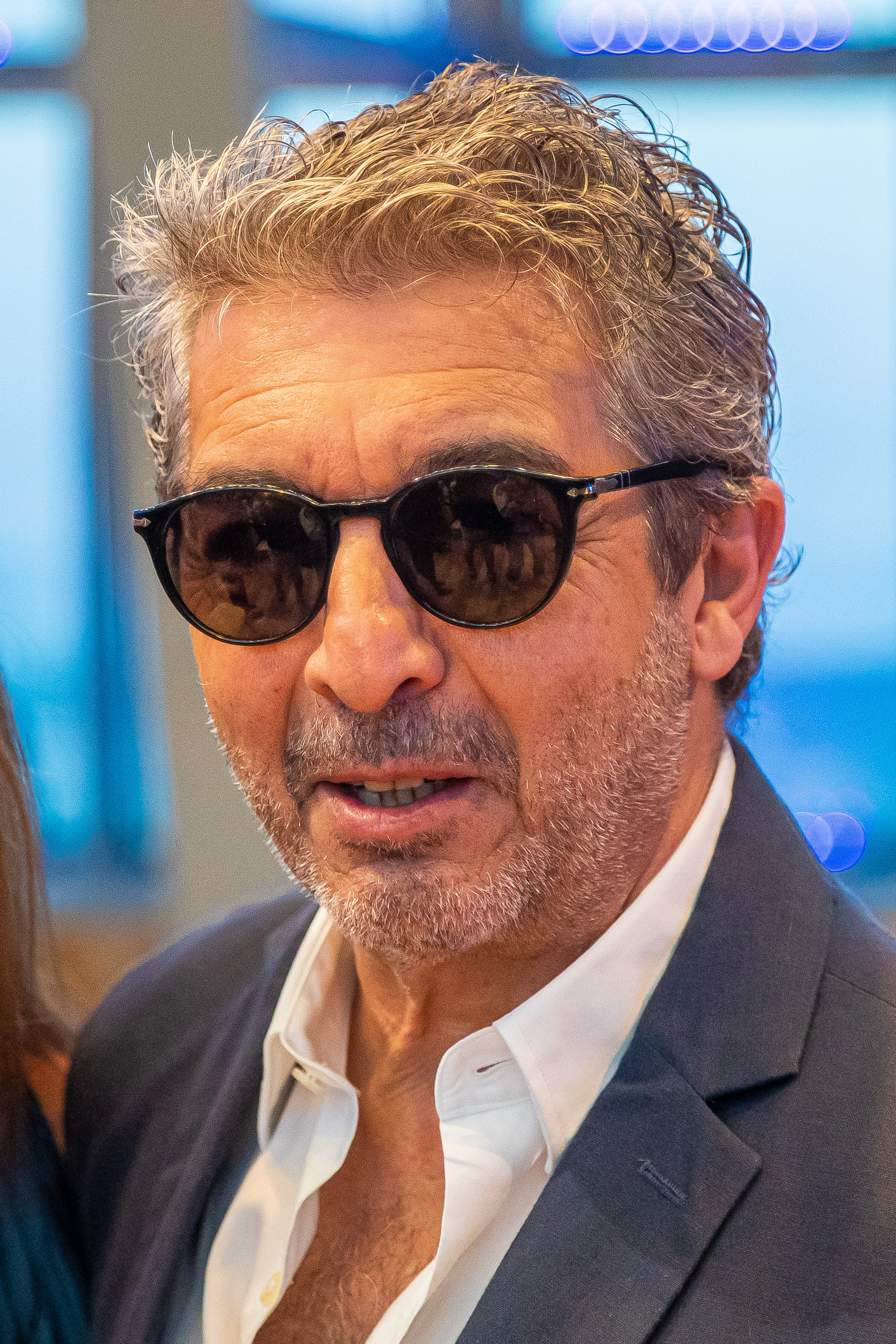
- 2026 recipient: Ricardo Darín
- Country: Ibero-America
- Presented by: Entidad de Gestión de Derechos de los Productores Audiovisuales (EGEDA); Federación Iberoamericana de Productores Cinematográficos y Audiovisuales (FIPCA)
- Currently held by: Ricardo Darín for The Eternaut (2026)
- Website: premiosplatino.com

The Platino Award for Best Actor in a Miniseries or TV series (Spanish: Mejor Interpretación Masculina en Miniserie o Teleserie) is one of the Platino Awards, Ibero-America's film awards presented annually by the Entidad de Gestión de Derechos de los Productores Audiovisuales (EGEDA) and Federación Iberoamericana de Productores Cinematográficos y Audiovisuales (FIPCA).

== History ==
Until the 3rd edition of the awards, only film categories were awarded. In 2017, the category for Best Miniseries or TV series was introduced, being followed the next year by performance categories in television productions (male lead and female lead). In 2020, the categories for acting in television were split between lead and supporting.

The category for Best Actor was first awarded in 2018 at the 5th Platino Awards with Argentine actor Julio Chávez being the first recipient of the award for his role as Abel Prat in the miniseries El Maestro, aired on El Trece and TNT Latinoamérica.

No actor has received the award more than once while Spanish actor Javier Cámara has the most nominations in the category with three, followed by Diego Boneta and Álvaro Morte with two each. Additionally, both nominations for Morte were for the same character and series (Sergio Marquina (The Professor) / Salvador "Salva" Martín in Money Heist). The three actors are the only actors to be nominated more than once in the category.

In the list below the winner of the award for each year is shown first, followed by the other nominees.

== Winners and nominees ==
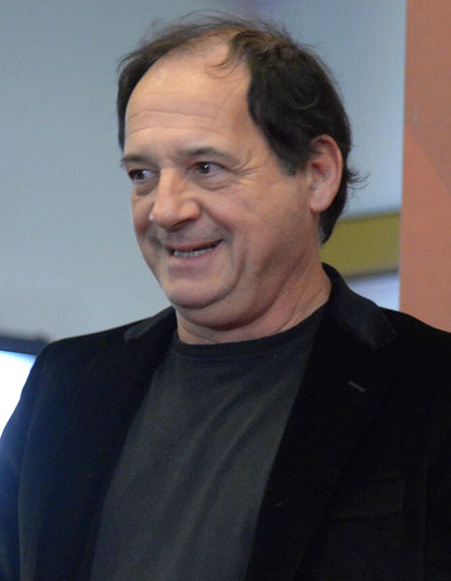
Julio Chávez, the first recipient of the award.

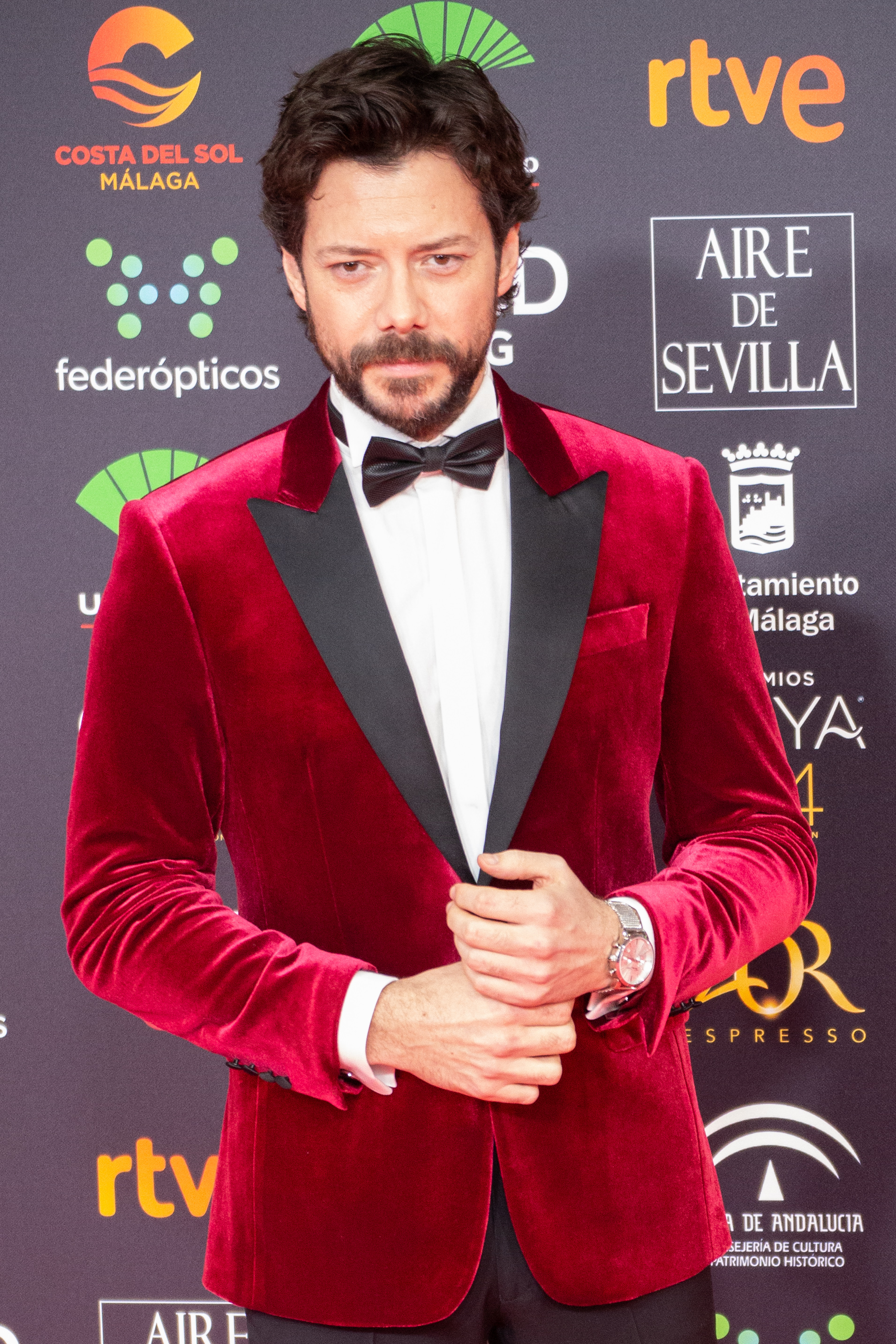
Álvaro Morte won in 2020.

=== 2010s ===
Year	Actor	Role(s)	English title	Original title
2018 (5th)
2018 (5th)	(Argentina) Julio Chávez	Abel Prat	El Maestro	
2018 (5th)	(Brazil) Júlio Andrade	Carlos Eduardo "Cadu" Fortuna	1 Contra Todos	
2018 (5th)	(Argentina) Luis Brandoni	Chelo Esculapio	Un gallo para Esculapio	
2018 (5th)	(Argentina) Peter Lanzani	Nelson	Un gallo para Esculapio	
2018 (5th)	(Spain) Asier Etxeandia	Raúl de la Riva	Velvet Colección	
2019 (6th)
2019 (6th)	(Mexico) Diego Luna	Miguel Ángel Félix Gallardo	Narcos: Mexico	
2019 (6th)	(Mexico) Diego Boneta	Luis Miguel	Luis Miguel: The Series	Luis Miguel: la serie
2019 (6th)	(Uruguay) Nicolás Furtado	Juan Pablo Borges	El Marginal	
2019 (6th)	(Spain) Javier Rey	Sito Miñanco	Cocaine Coast	Fariña

=== 2020s ===
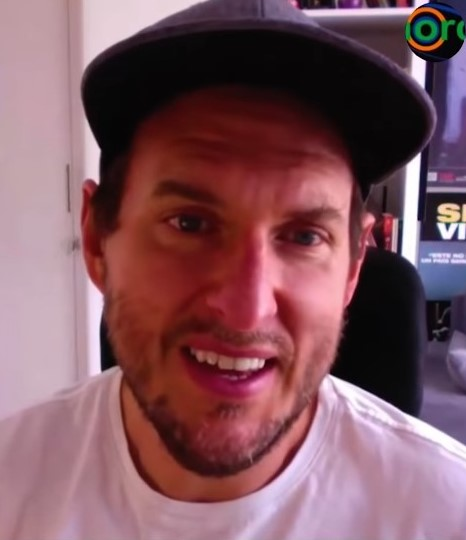
Andrés Parra won in 2021.

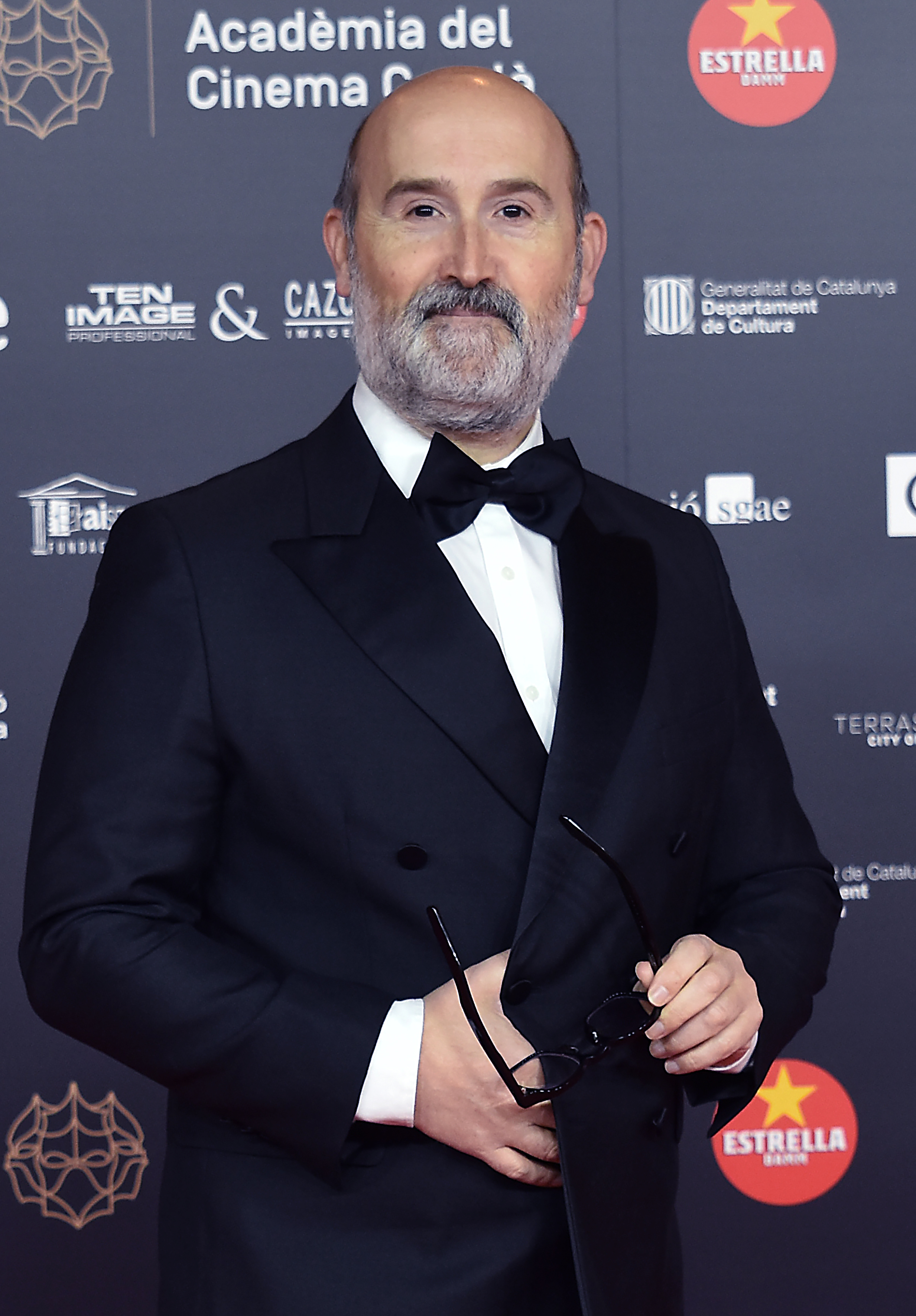
2022 winner Javier Cámara.

Year	Actor	Role(s)	English title	Original title
2020 (7th)
2020 (7th)	(Spain) Álvaro Morte	Sergio Marquina (The Professor) / Salvador "Salva" Martín	Money Heist	La casa de papel
2020 (7th)	(Spain) Javier Cámara	Juan Carrasco	Vota Juan	
2020 (7th)	(Spain) Óscar Jaenada	Hernán Cortés	Hernán	
2020 (7th)	(Argentina) Jorge Román	Carlos Monzón	Monzón: A Knockout Blow	Monzón
2021 (8th)	(Colombia) Andrés Parra	Roberto Lozano "Chayo"	The Great Heist	EL ROBO DEL $IGLO
2021 (8th)	(Mexico) Alejandro Speitzer	Gabino Falcón	Somebody Has To Die	Alguien tiene que morir
2021 (8th)	(Spain) Álvaro Morte	Sergio Marquina (The Professor) / Salvador "Salva" Martín	Money Heist	La casa de papel
2021 (8th)	(Spain) Eduard Fernández	Father Manuel Vergara	30 Coins	30 monedas
2022 (9th)	(Spain) Javier Cámara	Juan Carrasco	Venga Juan	
2022 (9th)	(Argentina) Chino Darín	Julio Clamens	El reino	
2022 (9th)	(Argentina) Darío Grandinetti	Antonio Díaz	Hierro	
2022 (9th)	(Mexico) Diego Boneta	Luis Miguel	Luis Miguel: The Series	Luis Miguel: la serie
2023 (10th)	(Argentina) Guillermo Francella	Eliseo	El Encargado	
2023 (10th)	(Mexico) Daniel Giménez Cacho	Fernando Barrientos	An Unknown Enemy	Un extraño enemigo
2023 (10th)	(Spain) Juan Diego Botto	Pablo Lopetegui	I Don't Like Driving	No me gusta conducir
2023 (10th)	(Colombia) Juan Pablo Raba	Alberto Villamizar	News of a Kidnapping	Noticia de un Secuestro
2024 (11th)	(Chile) Alfredo Castro	Salvador Allende	Los Mil Días de Allende	
2024 (11th)	(Argentina) Gustavo Bassani	José Pérez / Yosi	Yosi, the Regretful Spy	Iosi, el espía arrepentido
2024 (11th)	(Spain) Javier Cámara	Tomás Hernández	Rapa	
2024 (11th)	(Argentina) Santiago Korovsky	Felipe Rozenfeld	División Palermo	
2025 (12th)	(Colombia) Claudio Cataño	Colonel Aureliano Buendía	One Hundred Years of Solitude	Cien años de soledad
2025 (12th)	(Brazil) Alexandre Rodrigues	"Busca-pé" / Wilson Rodrigues	City of God: The Fight Rages On	Cidade de Deus: A Luta Não Para
2025 (12th)	(Spain) Alberto San Juan	Cristóbal Balenciaga	Cristóbal Balenciaga	
2025 (12th)	(Brazil) Gabriel Leone	Ayrton Senna	Senna	
2026 (13th)	(Argentina) Ricardo Darín	Juan Salvo	The Eternaut	El eternauta
2026 (13th)	(Spain) Álvaro Morte	Adolfo Suárez	The Anatomy of a Moment	Anatomía de un instante
2026 (13th)	(Spain) Javier Cámara	Joserra	Jakarta	
2026 (13th)	(Argentina) Leonardo Sbaraglia	Carlos Saúl Menem	Menem	
