= La maleta (film) =

- Theatrical release poster
- Directed by: Carlos Therón
- Screenplay by: Sara Antuña; Carlos de Pando
- Based on: an original story by Diego San José
- Produced by: Ghislain Barros; Álvaro Augustin; Antonio Asensio
- Starring: Lucía Caraballo; Alejandro Speitzer; Leonor Watling; David Lorente; Víctor Clavijo; Stéphanie Magnin; Hamid Krim; Yaël Belicha; Manuel Tallafé; Antonio Buíl
- Cinematography: Sergi Gallardo
- Edited by: Carolina Martínez Urbina
- Music by: Vanessa Garde
- Production companies: Telecinco Cinema; Zeta Cinema
- Distributed by: Universal Pictures International
- Release date: 16 October 2026
- Country: Spain
- Language: Spanish

La maleta ('the suitcase') is a 2026 Spanish action comedy film directed by Carlos Therón from a screenplay by Sara Antuña and Carlos de Pando starring Lucía Caraballo and Alejandro Speitzer.

== Plot ==
After meeting on a plane Laura and Nacho agree on dating if Laura's suitcase is the first one to come out of the baggage carousel. Laura decides to pick up the first suitcase anyways and declare it a win, even if the fact that the luggage belongs to dangerous criminal people is unbeknownst to her.

== Cast ==
- Lucía Caraballo
- Alejandro Speitzer
- Leonor Watling
- David Lorente
- Víctor Clavijo

== Production ==
Carlos de Pando and Sara Antuña wrote the screenplay from a story developed by Rafael Barceló, de Pando, and Antuña based on an original idea by Diego San José. The film is a Telecinco Cinema and Zeta Cinema production. Sergi Gallardo worked as director of photography.

== Release ==
Universal Pictures International Spain handled the theatrical release in Spain, which is scheduled for 16 October 2026.

== See also ==
- List of Spanish films of 2026
