= Old Dog, New Tricks (TV series) =

Spanish comedy television series

- Promotional release poster
- Spanish: Animal
- Created by: Víctor García León
- Directed by: Víctor García León; Alberto de Toro
- Starring: Luis Zahera; Lucía Caraballo
- Country of origin: Spain
- Original language: Spanish
- No. of seasons: 1
- No. of episodes: 9

Production
- Executive producers: Aitor Gabilondo; Jota Aceytuno
- Production company: Alea Media

Original release
- Network: Netflix
- Release: 3 October 2025 – present

Old Dog, New Tricks (Spanish: Animal) is a Spanish comedy television series created by Víctor García León starring Luis Zahera and Lucía Caraballo.

== Plot ==
The plot follows gruff rural veterinarian Antón from the fictional Galician village of Topomorto, who loses his clients and is begrudgingly forced to join an animal boutique managed by his niece Uxía.

== Cast ==
- Luis Zahera as Antón
- Lucía Caraballo as Uxía
- Carmen Ruiz as Sabela
- Antonio Durán "Morris" as Vicente

== Production ==
The series is an Alea Media production for Netflix, with Aitor Gabilondo and Jota Aceytuno serving as executive producers. In order to deliver a Galician-inflected accent, Madrid-based Caraballo stated in an interview that, from a position of utmost respect and love towards Galicia, she trained with Federico Pérez Rey. Shooting locations in Galicia included Dioño, A Calle, Pontemaceira, Teo, Vedra, and Santiago de Compostela.

On 21 October 2025, Netflix announced the renewal of the series for a second season. In 2026, during the filming of season two, the greenlight for a third season was reported.

== Release ==
Netflix released the series on 3 October 2025.

== Accolades ==
Year	Award	Category	Nominee(s)	Result	Ref.
2025	31st Forqué Awards	Best Series		Nominated	
2025	31st Forqué Awards	Best Actor in a Series	Luis Zahera	Nominated	
2026	13th Feroz Awards	Best Comedy Series		Nominated	
2026	13th Feroz Awards	Best Main Actor in a Series	Luis Zahera	Nominated	
2026	9th ALMA Awards	Best Screenplay in a Comedy Series	Víctor García León, Araceli Álvarez de Sotomayor, Germán Aparicio, Ana Boyero, Daniel Castro	Nominated	
2026	54th International Emmy Awards	Best Comedy Series		Pending	

== See also ==
- 2025 in Spanish television
