= Better Class =

- Theatrical release poster
- Spanish: Altas capacidades
- Directed by: Víctor García León
- Written by: Borja Cobeaga; Víctor García León
- Produced by: Marisa Fernández Armenteros; Eneko Lizarraga Arratibel; Sandra Hermida; Nahikari Ipiña
- Starring: Marian Álvarez; Israel Elejalde; Juan Diego Botto; Natalia Reyes; Suso Nanclares; Pilar Castro
- Cinematography: Eva Díaz Iglesias
- Edited by: Buster Franco
- Music by: Camila Rodríguez
- Production companies: Buenapinta Media; Sayaka Producciones; Colosé Producciones; Think Studio; Altas Capacidades Película AIE; Cimarrón
- Distributed by: BTeam Pictures
- Release dates: 7 March 2026 (Málaga); 27 March 2026 (Spain)
- Running time: 101 minutes
- Countries: Spain; Uruguay
- Language: Spanish

Better Class (Spanish: Altas capacidades, lit. 'high capabilities') is a 2026 black comedy film directed by Víctor García León and co-written by Borja Cobeaga. Its stars Israel Elejalde and Marian Álvarez along with Juan Diego Botto, Natalia Reyes, Suso Nanclares, and Pilar Castro. The plot follows a couple of middle class parents (Elejalde and Álvarez) who see the opportunity of enrolling their son (Nanclares) on an exclusive secular school, thereby promoting their social clout to the upper class, although they pretend to do it for the boy's future.

The film premiered at the 29th Málaga Film Festival ahead ot its 27 March 2026 theatrical release in Spain by BTeam Pictures.

== Plot ==
Alicia (working in a magazine) and Gonzalo (working in a bank) are a middle class couple with a 9-year-old son (Fer) who has been given a warning at the public primary education school for showing his genitals to other boys and girls. Alicia tentatively seeks information about whether there are vacant spots at the Pyros, an elitist private school. She is shown the facilities and interviews with the director Mar. She proposes to join the wait list while playing hard to get, taking advantage of the fact that the school has been in the news due to the discovery of the corpse of a Colombian narco—who was also a student father—at the school gates. While at the workplace, Gonzalo receives the visit of his boss Domingo, who has a child enrolled at the Pyros and is rejoiced by the possibility of Gonzalo's son joining, as the students' parents would love to have "normal" parents "like" Gonzalo in there. Before saying goodbye, Domingo also invites Gonzalo to his daughter's birthday, taking place on the same day as Fer's friend Tomás'.

At Tomás' party, Fer gets in a row with Tomás, because he has been told to have intellectual giftedness. Alicia and Gonzalo also tell other parents that they are going to "reject" the Pyros' offer. Alicia, Gonzalo, and Fer go then to Domingo's daughter barbecue party at Domingo's mansion, where they acquaint with the rich milieus the Pyros' parents belong to, and where Gonzalo male bonds with other fathers through collective cocaine snorting. Alicia happens to meet Paz, the widow of the Colombian narco, who confesses to Alicia that she is not happy in Madrid, dislikes the rest of students' parents and is thinking about leaving for Miami. Fer befriends Paz's son Samuel. It is brought to Alicia's attention that Paz is not wanted because she gives the school a bad image.

As they plan for Fer's possible enrollment at the Pyros and the substantial fees that come with it, Alicia and Gonzalo put the idea of having a second child on hold. They also visit Alicia's parents, in order to ask them for money. To persuade Alicia's mother, Alicia tells her that Fer suffers from dyslexia. Domingo tells Gonzalo about future promotions connected to renewable energies, pressing him to get rid of Paz once and for all. In order to get close to Paz, Alicia and Gonzalo visit the Pyros and sign Fer up for after-school activities, buying a piano for home practice. Still attending the public school, Fer gets into another brawl with Tomás and breaks his guitar, prompting a meeting between the principal and the boys' parents.

Eager to remain in Madrid because of the wonderful friendship developed between Samuel and Fer, Paz takes a begrudging Alicia to a bar for a few drinks, while Fer stays with Samuel at Paz's residence. The two women befriend and get drunk and, together with Gonzalo, they move to a nightclub, where Gonzalo and Paz dance together. At the club's restroom, Gonzalo makes unsuccessful sexual advances on Paz, who hits him with a blunt object on the forehead and leaves. Alicia heals Gonzalo back home while she makes him aware of her disappointment. Ready to leave home early to pick Fer from Paz's house before entering work, Gonzalo receives a call telling that Fer has been accepted at the Pyros. Gonzalo and Alicia are made to wait on their car at Paz's mansion gates. Holding a loaded gun, a furious Paz appears in her car with Fer. While Gonzalo asks for forgiveness for whatever he did wrong at the club, Paz tells them that her son had been tortured and been pointed at with the gun by Fer for the whole night. After leaving the scene, Fer tells their parents that he indeed threatened Samuel with the gun, as he needed to switch schools and take Samuel's place because he was told by his grandmother that he suffered from dyslexia. As Fer finally makes it to the Pyros, Gonzalo and Alicia are offered to join the students' parents' chat, but they rush to leave as they see Fer mooning.

== Cast ==
- Israel Elejalde as Gonzalo
- Marian Álvarez as Alicia
- Juan Diego Botto as Domingo
- Natalia Reyes as Paz
- Pilar Castro as Mar
- Suso Nanclares as Fer

== Production ==
The film is a Buenapinta Media (Marisa Fernández Armenteros), Sayaka Producciones (Nahikari Ipiña), Colosé Producciones (Sandra Hermida), Think Studio (Eneko Lizarraga) and Altas Capacidades Película AIE co-production with Cimarrón (Santiago López), a The Mediapro Studio company. It had the participation of RTVE, Movistar Plus+, and Orange.

Filming began on 10 February 2025. Eva Díaz Iglesias worked as director of photography, using an Arri Alexa 35 camera and Arri Ensō lenses. Shooting locations included a school in La Moraleja.

== Release ==
Cast and crew members attending the 2026 Málaga Film Festival

The film was presented in the main competitive section of the 29th Málaga Film Festival in March 2026. Distributed by BTeam Pictures, it was released theatrically in Spain on 27 March 2026.

== Reception ==
Enric Albero of El Cultural found in the film "a dramatic and aesthetic refinement that Spanish film comedy has been renouncing for years", vindicated by the director by "populating the story with ignoble characters" and "emptying it of psychologisms".

Víctor A. Gómez of La Opinión de Málaga lamented that all the characters "come across as unpleasant, but unfortunately not in a likeable, attractive way", although pointing out that Botto nails his character as stylish and suave boss of ultimate bastardry.

Joan Pons of Ara rated the film 4 out of 5 stars, writing that the comedy is "very subtle, has a script that makes you say 'Yes, sir,' and delivers piercing truths with a half-smile".

Raquel Hernández Luján of HobbyConsolas gave the film a 72-point score, determining to be one of those films that "leave you pondering, with a wry smile and a strong sense of unease, because it feels more like reality than fiction", otherwise highlighting a superlative Botto as the best thing about the film.

Beatriz Martínez of Fotogramas rated the film 4 out of 5 stars, declaring it "a magnificent satire that explores public education, ideological clashes, the anxiety surrounding social mobility, and contemporary hypocrisy".

Rubén Romero Santos of Cinemanía rated the film 3½ out of 5 stars, deeming it to be "a chilling, uncomfortable comedy that could easily have been directed by Ruben Östlund".

In a 4-star rating, Luis Martínez of El Mundo assessed that the film "delivers laughters just as easily as it freezes them".

Manuel J. Lombardo of Diario de Sevilla gave the film a 4-star rating, assessing that it reveals a recognisable Spain full of esperpento "without resorting to exaggeration, caricature or distortion".

Guillermo Balbona of El Diario Montañés gave the film a 5-star rating, writing that it excels in "its dialogues and situations, like a finely honed and sharp scalpel, cutting and incisive".

Carlos Boyero of El País assessed that "the satire is believable. And subtle. And nothing feels forced", while also mentioning a "masterful" performance by Botto.

== See also ==
- List of Spanish films of 2026
