= Esty Quesada =

Spanish YouTuber

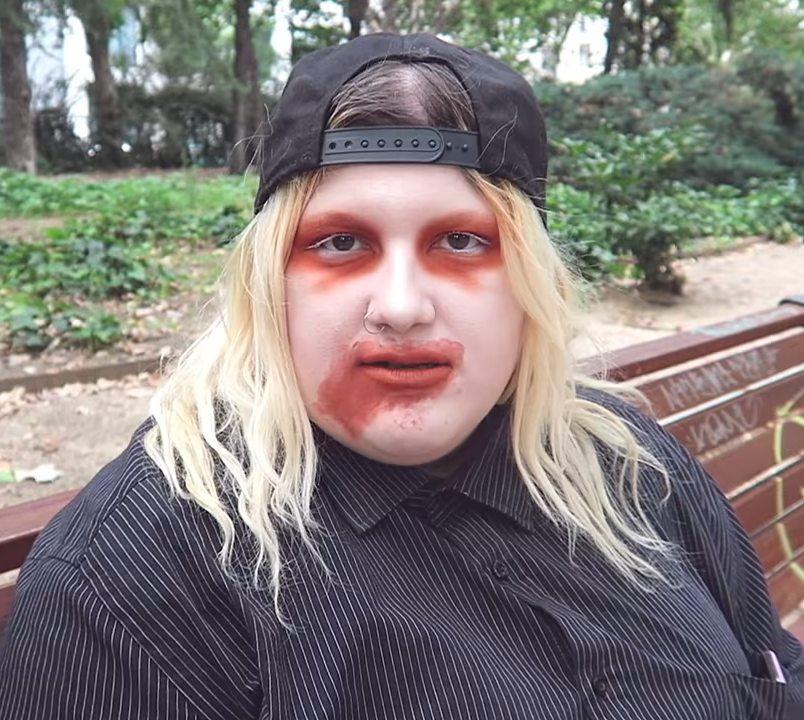
- Born: Estíbaliz Quesada; 30 July 1994 (age 32); Baracaldo, Spain
- Occupations: YouTuber; actress; DJ

YouTube information
- Channel: Soy una pringada
- Years active: 2014–present
- Subscribers: 516 thousand
- Views: 59.1 million
- Last updated: 18 October 2026

Estíbaliz "Esty" Quesada (born 30 July 1994), also known as Soy una pringada, is a Spanish YouTuber, content creator, disc jockey, actress, and director.

== Biography ==
=== Childhood ===
Quesada grew up in the Cruces neighborhood of the city of Baracaldo, in the province of Vizcaya. In her own words, she grew up in an unstructured family. Her father died when she was a child, and she lived with her two sisters and her mother, who did not take care of her daughters and often put her material whims before the feeding or basic care of the girls in her care. They also had debt problems. Quesada has also said that her maternal grandmother sexually abused her, but she did not find out about this until she went to therapy as an adult.

Due to Quesada's experience, the bullying she received at school for her selective mutism and her weight, Quesada began to self-harm and have suicidal thoughts from an early age.

=== YouTube ===
In 2015, Esty began posting videos on YouTube as a form of distraction.

In the videos on her channel, titled "Soy una pringada", she discusses topics related to LGBT, makeup, television, film, internet and her personal experiences, from a pessimistic, humorous, ironic and irreverent perspective. She currently continues to upload videos to the platform, but sporadically.

Many of her videos have gone viral beyond her followers and have been controversial, among which Carlota Corredera, Gorda Tracionera, in which she criticizes the Telecinco presenter Carlota Corredera, and Odio a los heteros, in which she parodies and criticizes the macho behavior of cisgender heterosexual men.

=== Professional career ===
Thanks to the fame achieved with her YouTube channel and with her social networks in general, Quesada made the leap to television with Snacks de tele, a four-part series cancelled after the fifth broadcast due to its audience failure.

However, this did not stop her character from continuing to grow and becoming a mass phenomenon. It was then that she began to appear in films and television series. She was part of the cast of La llamada, a 2017 musical film directed by Javier Calvo and Javier Ambrossi, playing the supporting role of Marta. In addition, that same year, she was part of the Playz fiction Colegas.

In 2018, Atresmedia gave her the opportunity to direct and write her own series, Looser, broadcast on the digital platform Atresplayer (then called Flooxer) and produced by Javier Calvo and Javier Ambrossi, among others. Her debut as director was met with negative reviews for the lack of rhythm and structure in the series, which has had no continuity after the first season.

In 2019, it was announced she had signed for the TNT Spain series Vota Juan, starring Javier Cámara and María Pujalte, in which she plays the role of Eva Carrasco. In 2020, she continued playing the same character in the spin-off of the previous one called Vamos Juan.

In 2020, she co-starred with Nuria Roca in TNT's docu-realit Road Trip, in which the two drive from Miami to Nueva York in a van. After the good reception, that same year they began filming a second season, this time in Spain and with Carmina Barrios as a new traveling companion.

She has written two books: Freak in 2017 and Las cosas que me salvaron la vida in 2018 with publishers Hidroavión and Plan B, respectively, and since 2020 she has had her own podcast called Club de Fans de Shrek.

== Controversies ==
After her beginnings on YouTube in 2015, Quesada gained popularity mainly due to a video published in May 2017 entitled Carlota Corredera: gorda traicionera, in which she criticized a television presenter, referring to her as "a fat self-conscious woman who promotes body positivity and curviness after losing 60 kilos" and stating that "nobody has to make you feel bad about your weight, Carlota Corredera. Maybe you are a self-conscious fat girl who thinks that she doesn't deserve to live because she's fat".

That same year, in the TV program Snacks de tele, she stated that "Andalusians are people, but maybe they are a little bit below the rest".

In 2021, she intervened in the Feroz Awards gala with a controversial monologue on ETA terrorism. A few months later, in September 2021, in the program La Fábrica de Gabriel Rufián she stated that Vox should be killed, that a limpet bomb should be placed in the wedding of Cristina Pedroche and Dabiz Muñoz, or that the influencer Pelayo Díaz "allegedly deserves death", as a result of which the said party announced that it was going to initiate legal action against both. In view of the controversy, Quesada apologized, claiming that she was speaking in a metaphorical way and stating that "I lost my way. I always speak in a humorous way, but perhaps this situation did not require it." Rufián, for his part, distanced himself from Quesada's comments and said that he did not agree with them.

== Personal life ==
Quesada is openly bisexual.

== Filmography ==
=== Cinema ===
Year	Title	Role	Directed by	Notes
2017	La llamada	Marta	Javier Calvo and Javier Ambrossi	Secondary role

=== Series ===
Year	Title	Role	Channel	Notes
2017 – 2018	Colegas	Soy una pringada	Playz	Recurring cast; 6 episodes
2018	Looser	Pringada	Flooxer	Main cast; 6 episodes
2018	Capítulo 0	Darkness	#0	1 episode
2018 – 2019	Paquita Salas	YouTuber	Netflix	2 episodes
2019	Vota Juan	Eva Carrasco	TNT España / Amazon Prime Video	Recurring cast; 6 episodes
2019	Terror y feria	Cleaner	Flooxer	1 episode
2020	Válidas	Esty	YouTube	1 episode
2020	Veneno	Take That fan	Atresplayer Premium	1 episode
2020	Vamos Juan	Eva Carrasco	TNT España	Main cast; 6 episodes
2021	No quiero ser pobre	Friend	YouTube	Main cast; 5 episodes
2021 – 2022	Venga Juan	Eva Carrasco	HBO Max	Main cast; 7 episodes

=== Programs ===
Year	Títle	Channel	Role
2017	Snacks de tele	Cuatro	Presenter
2020 – present	Road Trip	TNT	Protagonist of the docu-reality
2021	Celebrity Bake Off	Amazon Prime Video	Contestant

Year	Title	Channel	Duration
2017	Chester in love	Cuatro	1 program
2017	Convénzeme	Be Mad	1 program
2017	Dani&Flo	Cuatro	1 program
2018	Alaska y Mario	Paramount Network	1 program
2019	Quan arribin els marcians	TV3	1 program
2019	Retratos cono alma	La 1	1 program
2020	Dar cera, pulir 0	#0	1 program
2020	No pot ser!	TV3	1 program
2020	El hormiguero	Antena 3	1 program
