= Bárbara Santa-Cruz =

Spanish actress (born 1983)

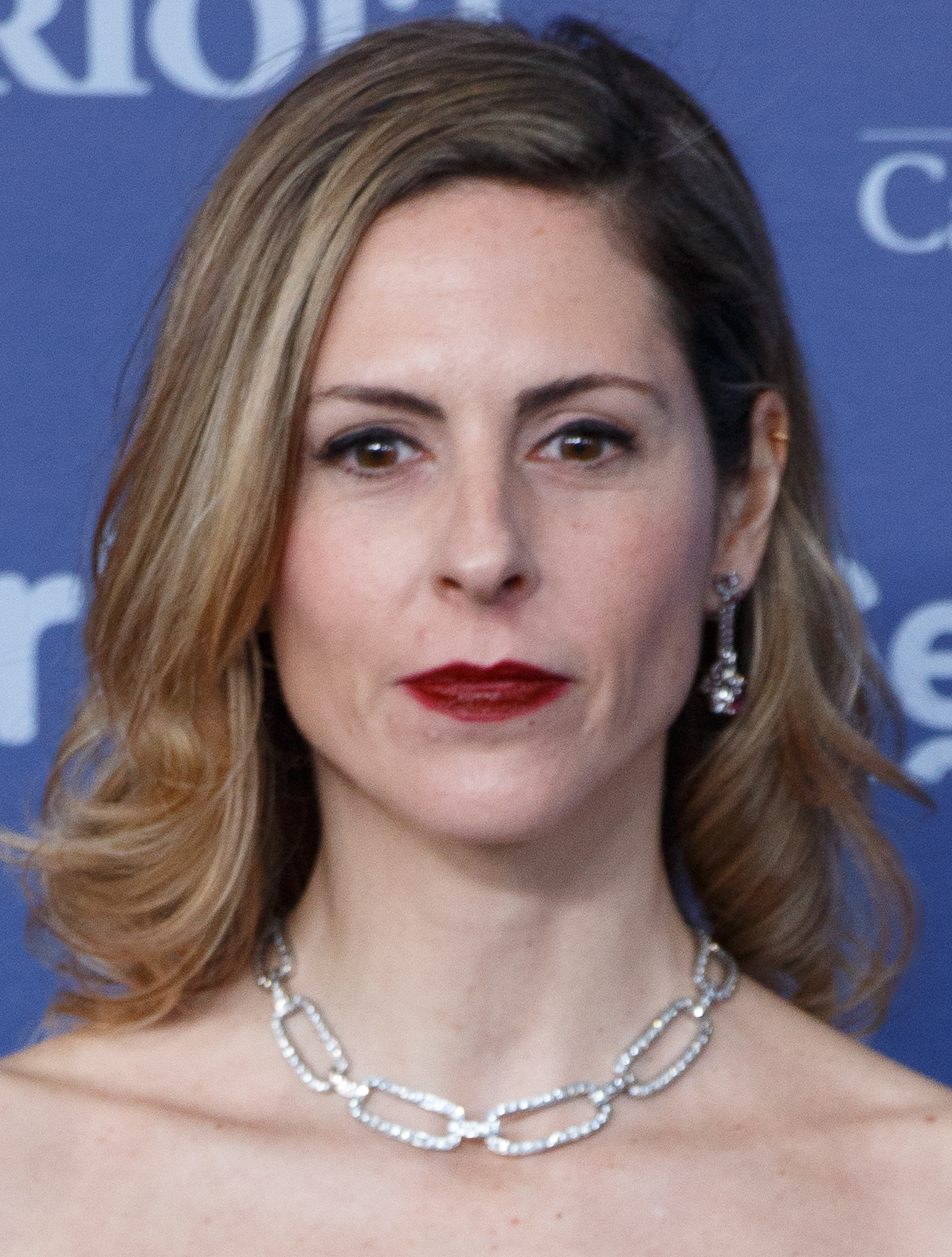
- Bárbara Santa-Cruz in 2023
- Born: 3 June 1983 (age 43); Madrid, Spain
- Occupation: Actress
- Years active: 2005-present
- Relatives: José García Nieto (grandfather)

Bárbara Santa-Cruz (born 3 June 1983) is a Spanish actress.

== Biography ==
Bárbara Santa-Cruz was born in 1983 in Madrid. She is the granddaughter of the poet and Cervantes Prize winner José García Nieto. Trained in Juan Carlos Corazza's studio with several teachers, including Manuel Morón, and with a degree in audiovisual communication, Bárbara began her career in film with Alauda Ruiz de Azúa with Clases particulares, a short film in which she starred alongside Álex García Fernández and for which she won numerous awards at festivals, including the Versión Española-AISGE.

Since then, she has worked with some of the most prestigious directors in this country. She played Gorka Otxoa's girlfriend in Pagafantas by Borja Cobeaga, who called her back to appear in No controles, his second film. She has also worked with Pedro Almodóvar in Los amantes pasajeros and with Javier Ruiz Caldera in 3 bodas de más, a character that earned her a nomination for best supporting actress at the Feroz Awards, given by the film press.

Bárbara is also known for her participation in successful independent films such as Barcelona, noche de verano and Barcelona, noche de invierno directed by Dani de la Orden and produced by Kike Maíllo, Bernat Saumell, José Corbacho and Andreu Buenafuente; where she played Laura, a woman from Madrid who lives in Barcelona with her partner Carles (Miki Esparbé). She has also participated in Ilusión by Daniel Castro, which won 3 Biznagas de Zonazine at the Malaga Spanish Film Festival 2013.

During 2012 she was part of the regular cast of the Spanish television series Amar en tiempos revueltos where she played Aurelia, a typist, in the seventh season of the series. That year she also participated in the mini-series Mi gitana, a biopic about the life of singer Isabel Pantoja.

In 2014 she joined as a fixed character in the Telecinco series El Príncipe, where she played Asun, a nurse at the hospital in Ceuta during the first season. She also joined the main cast of the Antena 3 series Vive Cantando, where she played Elena, a lawyer who returns to the neighborhood where she grew up. She also premiered Sexo Fácil, películas tristes by Alejo Flah, in which she shares cast with Marta Etura, Ernesto Alterio and repeats with Quim Gutiérrez and Carlos Areces with whom she coincided in 3 bodas de más and Los amantes pasajeros respectively.

In 2015 she was the presenter of the second edition of the Feroz Awards.

In 2016 she starred in the Antena 3 series Buscando el Norte playing Flor, a Spaniard based in Berlin with her husband (Fele Martínez) and daughter.

In television she has also participated in La familia Mata; Mesa para cinco, Inquilinos and Hay alguien ahí among others. Bárbara has also collaborated on several occasions with the creators of Muchachada Nui, appearing in Museo Coconut and the yet to be released Retorno a Liliford. In theater she has worked under the orders of Leticia Dolera, Borja Crespo, Paco Caballero, Borja Cobeaga and her teacher Juan Carlos Corazza in Platonov, by Antón Chéjov

== Filmography ==
=== Television ===
- Museo Coconut (2010)
- Mi gitana (2012)
- La familia Mata (2009)
- Hay alguien ahí (2010)
- Amar en tiempos revueltos, as Aurelia González (2012)
- El Príncipe, as Asunción "Asun" (2014)
- Vive cantando, as Elena Romero (2014)
- Retorno a Lilifor, as Mark's ex-girlfriend, one episode (2015)
- Buscando el norte, as Flor Trujillo de la Riva (2016)
- Diarios de la cuarentena, as Bárbara (2020)

=== Feature films ===
- Amanece en Samaná (2024)
- Si yo fuera rico by Álvaro Fernández Armero (2019)
- La tribu by Fernando Colomo (2018)
- Sin rodeos by Santiago Segura (2018)
- Barcelona, noche de invierno by Dani de la Orden (2015)
- Sexo fácil, películas tristes by Alejo Flah (2014)
- 3 bodas de más by Javier Ruiz Caldera (2013)
- Los amantes pasajeros by Pedro Almodóvar (2013)
- Barcelona, noche de verano by Dani de la Orden (2013)
- Ilusión by Daniel Castro (2013)
- Pagafantas by Borja Cobeaga (2009)
- Sangre de mayo by José Luis Garci (2008)

=== Short films ===
- La mesa baila como Patri, directed by Brays Efe

=== Theater ===
- Platonov by Juan Carlos Corazza
- El jardín de los cerezos under the title El huerto de guindos by Raúl Tejón
- Neutrex by Leticia Dolera
- All about Mari Carmen by Borja Cobeaga
- Swingers by Paco Caballero
- Super Pussies by Borja Crespo and Miguel Ángel Martín
- En Blanco by Eva Pallarés

== Awards and nominations ==
Nominated for Best Supporting Actress at the first edition of the Feroz Awards along with Rossy de Palma; Verónica Echegui; Natalia de Molina and Terele Pávez.

Award for Best Supporting Performance in the seventh season of Amar en tiempos revueltos.

AISGE Award for Best Female Interpretation Spanish Version-SGAE.

"Fotofilmcalella 2007" Award for the best female performance.

Award for best female performance "Cinemalaga 2006".

Award for the best female interpretation "Escorto 2006".
