= I Don't Like Driving =

Spanish television series

- Promotional release poster
- Spanish: No me gusta conducir
- Created by: Borja Cobeaga
- Directed by: Borja Cobeaga
- Starring: Juan Diego Botto; Lucía Caraballo; David Lorente; Leonor Watling
- Country of origin: Spain
- Original language: Spanish
- No. of seasons: 1
- No. of episodes: 6

Production
- Running time: c. 30 min
- Production company: Sayaka Producciones

Original release
- Network: TNT
- Release: 25 November – 9 December 2022

I Don't Like Driving (Spanish: No me gusta conducir) is a Spanish comedy television series created and directed by Borja Cobeaga. Produced by Sayaka Producciones for Warner Bros. Discovery, it stars Juan Diego Botto, alongside Leonor Watling, Lucía Caraballo, and David Lorente.

== Plot ==
The plot follows Pablo Lopetegui, a misanthropic university lecturer in his 40s believing himself to be morally superior to others who needs to get a driving license. To that purpose, he joins a driving school, meeting with one of his alumns at the university (Yolanda), and driving teacher Lorenzo, among others. Meanwhile, Lopetegui also maintains a very amicable relationship with his ex-wife.

== Cast ==
- Juan Diego Botto as Pablo Lopetegui
- Lucía Caraballo as Yolanda
- Leonor Watling as Iria
- David Lorente as Lorenzo
- Carlos Areces
- Eugenia Cuaresma
- Marta Larralde
- Javier Cámara

== Production ==
The series is a Sayaka Producciones production. Diana Rojo, Borja González Santaolalla, Valentina Viso, Mar Coll, and Juan Cavestany collaborated in writing duties. Shooting locations included Madrid, the province of Cuenca, Carranque, San Lorenzo de El Escorial, Alcalá de Henares, San Sebastián de los Reyes, and San Martín de la Vega.

== Release ==
The first three episodes pre-screened at the Serializados Fest on 25 October 2022. The series premiered on TNT on 25 November 2022. In the US, the series debuted exclusively on HBO Max on 12 January 2023.

== Accolades ==
Year	Award	Category	Nominee(s)	Result	Ref.
2023	10th Feroz Awards	Best Comedy Series		Won	
2023	10th Feroz Awards	Best Actor in a TV Series	Juan Diego Botto	Won	
2023	10th Feroz Awards	Best Supporting Actress in a TV Series	Leonor Watling	Nominated	
2023	10th Feroz Awards	Best Supporting Actor in a TV Series	David Lorente	Won	
2023	70th Ondas Awards	Best Television Actor	Juan Diego Botto	Won	
2023	10th Platino Awards	Best Actor in a Miniseries or TV Series	Juan Diego Botto	Nominated	
2023	10th Platino Awards	Best Supporting Actor in a Miniseries or TV Series	David Lorente	Nominated	
2023	10th Platino Awards	Best Supporting Actress in a Miniseries or TV Series	Leonor Watling	Nominated	
