= Easy Sex, Sad Movies =

- Film poster
- Spanish: Sexo fácil, películas tristes El amor y otras historias
- Directed by: Alejo Flah
- Starring: Ernesto Alterio; Quim Gutiérrez; Marta Etura; Julieta Cardinali; Carlos Areces; Bárbara Santa-Cruz
- Release dates: 16 October 2014 (Argentina); 24 April 2015 (Spain)
- Running time: 91 minutes
- Countries: Argentina; Spain
- Language: Spanish

Easy Sex, Sad Movies (Spanish: El amor y otras historias as released in Argentina or Sexo fácil, películas tristes in Spain) is a 2014 Argentine-Spanish comedy film directed by Alejo Flah. It stars Ernesto Alterio, Quim Gutiérrez, Marta Etura, Julieta Cardinali, Carlos Areces and Bárbara Santa-Cruz.

== Cast ==
- Ernesto Alterio as Pablo Diuk
- Quim Gutiérrez as Víctor Montero
- Marta Etura as Marina
- Julieta Cardinali as Valeria
- Luis Luque as Andrés
- Carlos Areces as Luis
- Bárbara Santa-Cruz as Clara

== Release ==
The film was theatrically released in Argentina on 16 October 2014. Distributed by Filmax, it was theatrically released in Spain on 24 April 2015.

== See also ==
- List of Argentine films of 2014
- List of Spanish films of 2015
