= Jakarta (TV series) =

2025 Spanish television series

- Promotional release poster
- Spanish: Yakarta
- Created by: Diego San José
- Written by: Diego San José; Daniel Castro; Fernando Delgado-Hierro
- Directed by: Elena Trapé; Javier Cámara; Fernando Delgado-Hierro
- Starring: Javier Cámara; Carla Quílez
- Music by: Lucas Vidal
- Country of origin: Spain
- Original language: Spanish
- No. of seasons: 1
- No. of episodes: 6

Production
- Executive producers: Fran Araújo; Ignacio Corrales; Laura Fernández Espeso; Javier Méndez; Alejandro Flórez; Diego San José
- Cinematography: Rita Noriega
- Production companies: 100 Balas; Buendía Estudios Canarias

Original release
- Network: Movistar Plus+
- Release: 6 November 2025

Jakarta (Spanish: Yakarta) is a 2025 Spanish sports drama television series created by Diego San José. It stars Javier Cámara and Carla Quílez.

== Plot ==
Former olympian badminton player José Ramón Garrido now teaches physical education at a Vallecas high school and thinks to have found a promising young prospect in teenager Mar, envisioning her as his ticket to Jakarta. However their road to Jakarta is paved by stops in filthy hostals, decayed sports centres, and oil stations in provincial towns such as Totana, Ponferrada, Torrelavega, and Tardajos.

== Cast ==
- Javier Cámara as Joserra
- Carla Quílez as Mar
- David Lorente as Millán
- Pilar Gómez
- Marina Guerola as Laura
- Anna Alarcón
- Nuria Mencía as Claudia, Mar's mother

== Production ==
A Movistar Plus+ original series, Jakarta is a 100 Balas (The Mediapro Studio) and Buendía Estudios Canarias production. Shooting locations included Rivas, Moratalaz, Collado Villalba, Pinto, Torres de la Alameda, Fuenlabrada, Alcalá de Henares, San Martín de la Vega, Cobeña, Alcorcón, Morata de Tajuña, Santa Olalla, and Santa Cruz de Tenerife.

== Release ==
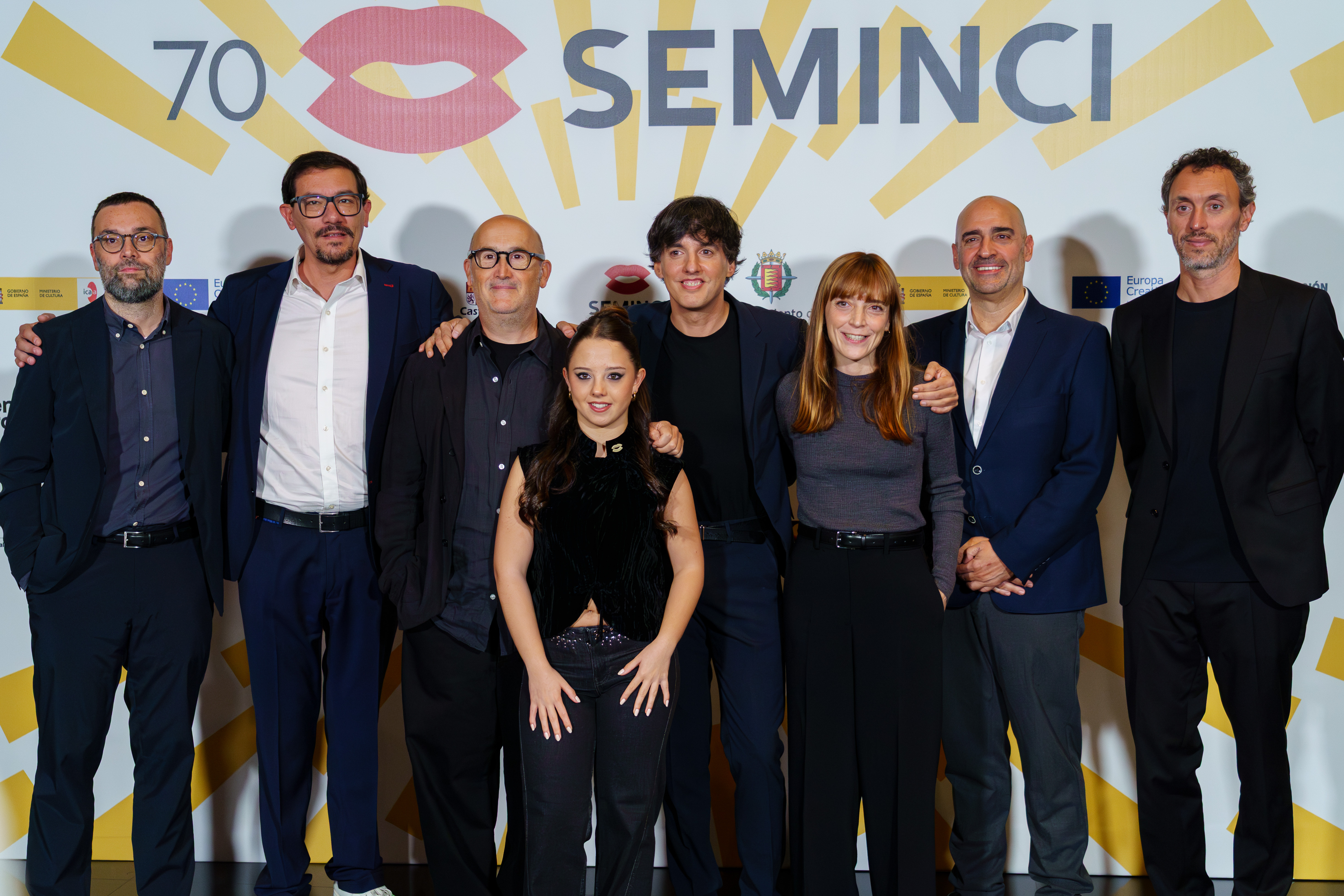
Cast and crew members attending the 2025 Seminci

The series is set to be presented at the 70th Valladolid International Film Festival (Seminci). It is set to debut on Movistar Plus+ on 6 November 2025. The series was also programmed at the 40th Mar del Plata International Film Festival.

== Reception ==
Enric Albero of El Cultural rated the series 4½ out of 5 stars, mentioning a third episode which is, without a doubt, "a pinnacle of contemporary Spanish television telefiction".

Raquel Hernández Luján of HobbyConsolas gave Jakarta 85 points ('very good'), highlighting the writing and the quality of the performances (specially Cámara's) as the best thing about the series, while warning that it is "very harsh and dark series".

== Accolades ==
Year	Award	Category	Nominee(s)	Result	Ref.
2025	31st Forqué Awards	Best Actor in a Series	Javier Cámara	Won	
2026	13th Feroz Awards	Best Drama Series		Won	
2026	13th Feroz Awards	Best Main Actor in a Series	Javier Cámara	Won	
2026	13th Feroz Awards	Best Main Actress in a Series	Carla Quílez	Nominated	
2026	13th Feroz Awards	Best Supporting Actor in a Series	David Lorente	Nominated	
2026	13th Feroz Awards	Best Screenplay in a Series	Diego San José, Daniel Castro, Fernando Delgado-Hierro	Won	
2026	81st CEC Medals	Best Series		Nominated	
2026	81st CEC Medals	Best Ensemble Cast in a Series		Nominated	
2026	9th ALMA Awards	Best Screenplay in a Drama Series	Diego San José, Daniel Castro, Fernando Delgado-Hierro	Nominated	
2026	13th Platino Awards	Best Actor in a Miniseries or TV Series	Javier Cámara	Nominated	
2026	13th Platino Awards	Best Actress in a Miniseries or TV Series	Carla Quílez	Nominated	
2026	54th International Emmy Awards	Best Performance by an Actor	Javier Cámara	Pending	

== See also ==
- 2025 in Spanish television
