= Lucía Caraballo =

Spanish actress and dancer (born 1999)

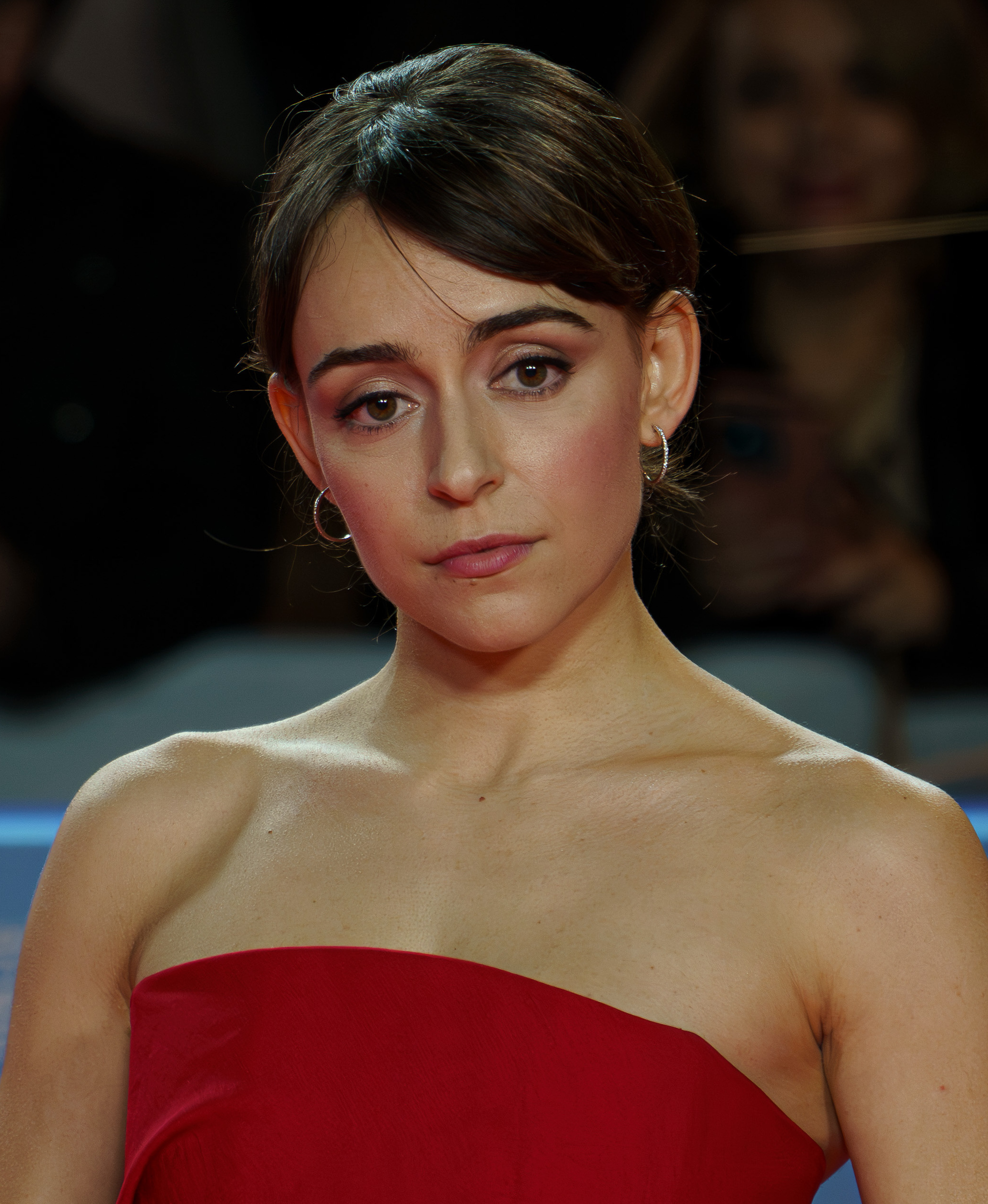
- Caraballo in 2025
- Born: Lucía Caraballo Fabelo; 27 July 1999 (age 27); Madrid, Spain
- Occupation: Actress

Lucía Caraballo Fabelo (born 1999) is a Spanish actress and dancer.

== Biography ==
Lucía Caraballo Fabelo was born on 27 July 1999 in Madrid. In 2006, at age seven, she was accepted to the Universidad Popular de Madrid, Tarugo Company.

== Film career ==
Caraballo made her acting debut in the low-budget film Carne cruda. In 2016, she featured in the film Don't Blame the Karma for Being an Idiot. In 2021, she starred in the Flooxer comedy miniseries La reina del pueblo. In 2022, she featured in the TNT costumbrista-like comedy miniseries I Don't Like Driving opposite Juan Diego Botto.

== Filmography ==
- Uniformed (2010), as Esther
- Buenas Noches, dijo la señorita Pájaro (2012)
- El amor me queda grande (2014), as Lucia
- La mujer que hablaba con los muertos (2014), as young Ursula
- Los huesos del frío (2014), as Lucia
- Un lío de millones (2024) as Paula
- Todos los lados de la cama (2025), as Julia
- La maleta

== Television ==
- Águila roja (2009)
- Los hombres de Paco (2009)
- Física o Química (2009)
- Hospital Central (2008 and 2009) as Nadia and Nuria
- Gran Reserva (2010) as young Lucia
- Víctor Ros (2014)
- El Caso. Crónica de sucesos (2016)
- Estoy vivo (2017–21) as Bea
- La reina del pueblo (2021) as Inma
- No me gusta conducir (2022) as Yolanda
- Las largas sombras (2024) as Teresa
- Old Dog, New Tricks (2025) as Uxía
