= ¡Ay, Señor, Señor! =

- Genre: Sitcom
- Created by: Antena 3
- Starring: Andrés Pajares
- Country of origin: Spain
- Original language: Spanish
- No. of episodes: 26

Original release
- Network: Antena 3
- Release: 1994 – 1995

¡Ay, Señor, Señor! (Oh, Lord, Lord!) was a 26-episode Spanish television sitcom transmitted by Antena 3 between 1994 and 1995. It tells of the adventures of a modern, open-minded priest, Don Luis Lagos, portrayed by the actor Andrés Pajares. The series kick-started several acting careers, including those of Neus Asensi and Javier Cámara, who played Padre Ángel Murillo.

The singer Massiel played the part of Rosa in four episodes and Paloma Cela played Asunción in nine, with many other actors and actresses making regular or guest appearances.
