= Joaquín Climent =

Spanish actor

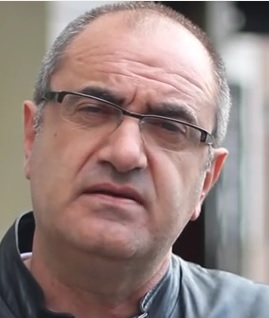
- Born: Joaquín Climent Asensi; 7 September 1958 (age 67); Requena, Spain
- Other names: Joaquim Climent
- Occupation: Actor

Joaquín Climent Asensi (born 7 September 1958) is a Spanish actor. He is primarily recognised as an established supporting actor in both film and television works. He has also performed in stage plays. He became popular for his role as Pascual in the police television series El comisario.

== Biography ==
Joaquín Climent Asensi was born on 7 September 1958 in Requena, province of Valencia. His first stable television role was that of Vicente Campillo in Querido maestro, whose broadcasting run spanned from 1997 to 1998.

He was married to actress Adriana Ozores with whom he has one child.

== Filmography ==
=== Film ===
Year	Title	Role	Notes	Ref.
1988	Amanece como puedas (Benifotrem)	Mario		
2000	El otro barrio (The Other Side)	Padre de Ramón		
2002	Los lunes al sol (Mondays in the Sun)	Rico		
2004	Héctor	Juan		
2005	Oculto (The Hidden)	Roberto		
2017	Pieles (Skins)	Alexis		
2017	El bar (The Bar)	Andrés		
2021	El sustituto (The Replacement)	Barea		
2021	El lodo (Wetland)	Eusebio		
2022	La manzana de oro	Carmelo		
2025	Parecido a un asesinato (Hidden Murder)	Ezequiel		

=== Television ===
Year	Title	Role	Notes	Ref.
1997–1998	Querido maestro	Vicente Campillo	40 episodes	
1999–2009	El comisario	Pascual Moreno		
2008–2009	Física o química	Adolfo	Seasons 1–4	
2010–2012	Amar en tiempos revueltos	Trino Muñoz	517 episodes. Introduced in season 6	
2013	Gran Reserva. El origen	Dimas		
2014	Ciega a citas	Zabaleta		
2015–2016	Seis hermanas	Benjamín Fuentes		
2019	Vota Juan	Luis Vallejo		
2020	Vamos Juan	Luis Vallejo	Reprise of role in Vota Juan	
2021	Venga Juan	Luis Vallejo	Reprise of role in Vota Juan and Vamos Juan	
2021	Ana Tramel. El juego (ANA. all in)	Barver		
2023	La Promesa	Rómulo Baeza		

== Accolades ==
Year	Award	Category	Work	Result	Ref.
2003	12th Actors and Actresses Union Awards	Best Film Actor in a Minor Role	Mondays in the Sun	Won	
2006	15th Actors and Actresses Union Awards	Best Television Actor in a Minor Role	El comisario	Nominated	
2007	16th Actors and Actresses Union Awards	Best Television Actor in a Minor Role	El comisario	Nominated	
2013	22nd Actors and Actresses Union Awards	Best Television Actor in a Minor Role	Amar en tiempos revueltos	Won	
2021	4th Berlanga Awards	Best Actor	Wetland	Nominated	
