= 8th Gaudí Awards =

- Date: 31 January 2016
- Site: Auditori Fòrum, Barcelona, Spain
- Hosted by: Rossy de Palma
- Organized by: Catalan Film Academy

Highlights
- Most awards: Truman (6)
- Most nominations: Spy Time and The King of Havana (12)

Television coverage
- Network: TV3
- Viewership: 0.33 million (11.8%)

The 8th Gaudí Awards ceremony, presented by the Catalan Film Academy, was held at the Auditori Fòrum in Barcelona on 31 January 2016. The gala was hosted by Rossy de Palma.

== Background ==
The nominations were read by Miki Esparbé and Àgata Roca from La Pedrera on 30 December 2015. The awards ceremony took place on 31 January 2016 and it was hosted by Rossy de Palma. It featured a musical performance by Sílvia Pérez Cruz.

The linear television broadcast on TV3 commanded 327,000 viewers (11.8% audience share).

== Winners and nominees ==
The winners and nominees are listed as follows:

| Best Film: El camí més llarg per tornar a casa; Barcelona Christmas Night; The Adoption; Un dia perfecte per volar | Bet Non-Catalan Language Film: Truman; Spy Time; The King of Havana; The Bride |
| Best Director: Cesc Gay — Truman; Agustí Villaronga — The King of Havana; Dani de la Orden — Barcelona Christmas Night; Sergi Pérez — El camí més llarg per tornar a casa | Best Screenplay: Cesc Gay, Tomàs Aragay — Truman; Agustí Villaronga — The King of Havana; Eduard Sola, Daniel González, Eric Navarro — Barcelona Christmas Night; Sergi Pérez, Eric Navarro, Roger Padilla — El camí més llarg per tornar a casa |
| Best Actress: Laia Costa — Victoria; Inma Cuesta — The Bride; Natalia de Molina — Food and Shelter; Nora Navas — The Adoption | Best Actor: Ricardo Darín — Truman; Borja Espinosa — El camí més llarg per tornar a casa; Francesc Garrido — The Adoption; Sergi López — Un dia perfecte per volar |
| Best Supporting Actress: Dolores Fonzi — Truman; Aina Clotet — Barcelona Christmas Night; Clara Segura — Barcelona Christmas Night; Rossy de Palma — Spy Time | Best Supporting Actor: Javier Cámara — Truman; Andrés Herrera — Vulcania; Berto Romero — Spy Time; Quim Gutiérrez — Spy Time |
| Best Production Supervision: Josep Amorós — Spy Time; Isidro Terraza — Truman; Josep Amorós, Carla Jovine — The King of Havana; Toni Novella — Palm Trees in the Snow | Best Documentary Film: Game Over; Gabo: The Creation of Gabriel Garcia Marquez; La Granja del Pas; Un día vi 10.000 elefantes |
| Best European Film: Tangerines; Pride; Clouds of Sils Maria; Force Majeure | Best Short Film: El adiós; Nada S.A.; No me quites; Zero |
| Best Television Film: 13 dies d'octubre; El Cafè de la Marina; El mètode Grönholm; Les nenes no haurien de jugar a futbol | Best Art Direction: Balter Gallart — Spy Time; Alain Bainée — Endless Night; Alain Ortiz — The King of Havana; Irene Montcada — Truman |
| Best Editing: Raúl Román — The King of Havana; Alberto de Toro — Spy Time; Alberto Gutiérrez — Barcelona Christmas Night; Liana Artigal — El camí més llarg per tornar a casa | Best Cinematography: Josep Maria Civit — The King of Havana; Andreu Rebés — Truman; Arnau Valls Colomer — Spy Time; Xavi Giménez — Palm Trees in the Snow |
| Best Original Music: Joan Valent — The King of Havana; Joan Dausà — Barcelona Christmas Night; Nico Cota — Truman; Xavier Capellas — The Adoption | Best Costume Design: María Gil, Sonia Segura — The King of Havana; Arantxa Ezquerro, Miriam Doz — The Bride; Cristina Rodríguez — Spy Time; Lole García Galeán — Palm Trees in the Snow |
| Best Sound: Oriol Tarragó, Sergio Bürmann, Marc Orts — Spy Time; Fernando Novillo, Franklin Hernández, Ricard Galceran — The King of Havana; Jésica Suárez, Albert Gay — Truman; Oriol Tarragó, Marc Orts — Capture the Flag | Best Makeup and Hairstyles: Pablo Perona, Sylvie Imbert, Paco Rodríguez — Endless Night; Ainhoa Eskisabel — The King of Havana; Eli Adánez, Sergio Pérez — Spy Time; Esther Guillem, Pilar Guillem — The Bride |
| Best Visual Effects: Lluís Castells, Lluís Rivera — Spy Time; Alex Villagrasa, Raúl Romanillos — Palm Trees in the Snow; Bernat Aragonés — Endless Night; Bernat Aragonés, Lluís Rivera — The King of Havana | Best Animated Film: Capture the Flag |

=== Films with multiple nominations and awards ===
Films with multiple nominations
| Nominations | Film |
|---|---|
| 12 | Spy Time |
| 12 | The King of Havana |
| 11 | Truman |
| 7 | Barcelona Christmas Night |
| 5 | El camí més llarg per tornar a casa |
| 4 | The Bride |
| 4 | Palm Trees in the Snow |
| 4 | The Adoption |
| 3 | Endless Night |
| 2 | Capture the Flag |
| 2 | Un dia perfecte per volar |

Films with multiple awards
| Awards | Film |
|---|---|
| 6 | Truman |
| 4 | Spy Time |
| 4 | The King of Havana |

== Honorary Award ==
Actress Rosa Maria Sardà was the recipient of the Gaudí honorary award.
