= Ana Jara Martínez =

Spanish actress

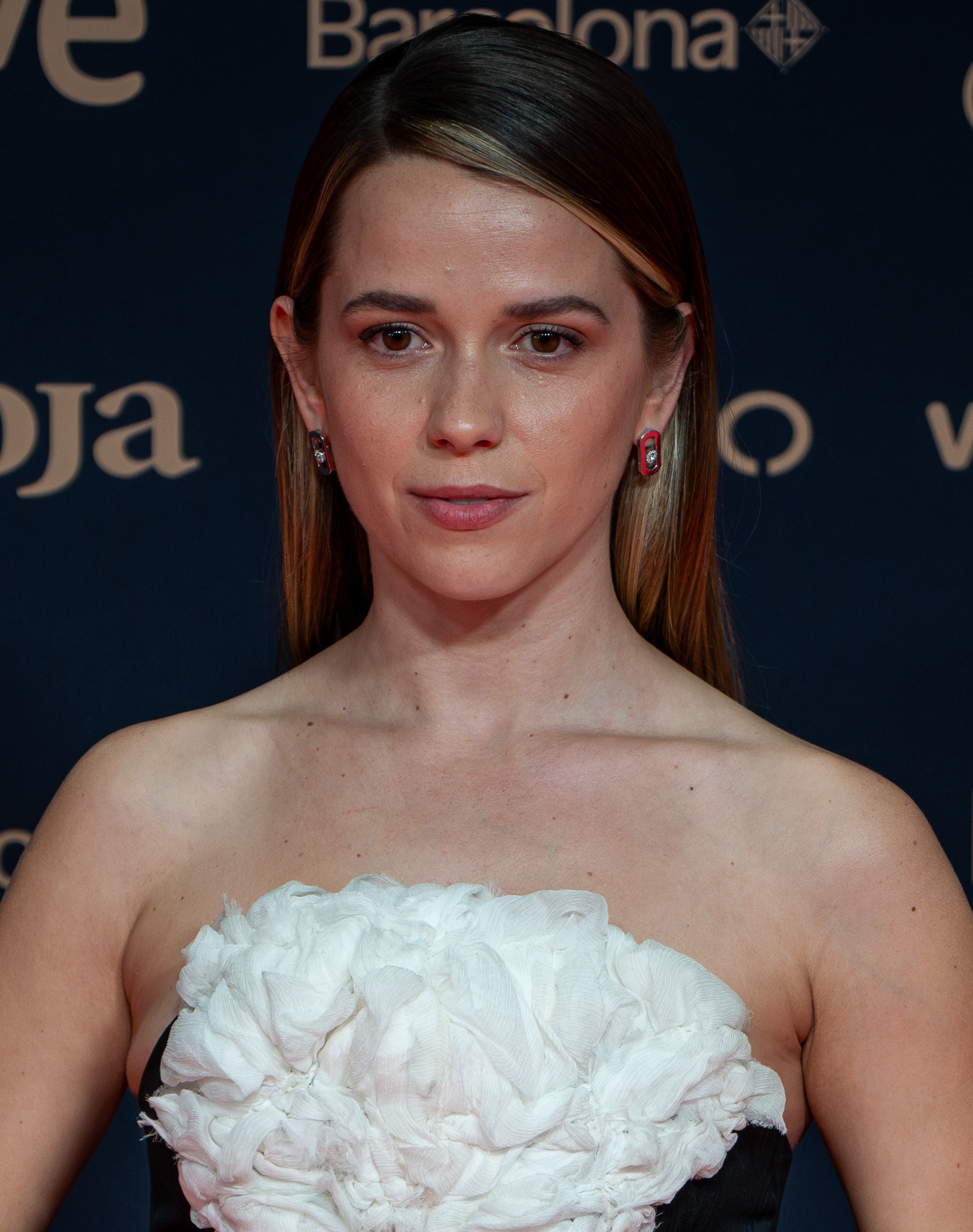
- Jara in 2026
- Born: Ana Jara Martínez; 17 November 1995 (age 30); Valencia, Spain
- Occupations: Actress, dancer and writer
- Years active: 2014-present

Ana Jara Martínez (Valencia, November 17, 1995), better known as Ana Jara, is a Spanish actress, dancer, singer, writer, and producer, best known for playing Jimena Medina in the Disney Channel teen series Soy Luna.

== Art studies ==
Since she was a child, she showed an interest in show business by taking theater, singing, musical comedy, and guitar lessons. She also took dance classes, specializing in different genres.

== Career ==
In Valencia, she was part of different plays, especially in several musical comedies, but her real leap to fame occurred in 2016 when she was part of the leading cast of the series Soy Luna. In addition, she was part of the soundtracks for the series and participated in the three tours (two in Latin America and one in Europe) of the series.

In 2015, she was part of the cast of the film Woman Rules, and then in 2016 (in parallel with her work in Soy Luna), she produced and starred in a short film.

In 2019, she will reprise her role as Anas in the second season of the Spanish series Bajo la Red, co-starring with Michael Ronda. That same year, she participated in the Atresplayer series Terror app and starred in the play Detrás de la diputada. In January 2020, she created her own theater production company, called La Caprichosa Producciones, acquiring the rights to the play Mamá está mas chiquita.

In 2021, she starred in the series La reina del pueblo In Atresplayer, where she plays Estefi. That same year, she was a guest on the Movistar+ program La resistencia, presented by David Broncano.

== Filmography ==
Year	Title	Role	Duration
2016-2018	Soy Luna	Jimena «Jim» Medina	Main cast (219 episodes)
2019	Bajo la red	Anaís Abarrategui	Main cast (season 2); 7 episodes
2019	Terror App	Almu	1 episode
2021	La reina del pueblo	Estefi	Main cast (6 episodes)
2023	4 estrellas	Luz Romaña Lasierra	Main cast (129 episodes)

=== Cinema ===
Year	Title	Role	Notes
2015	Women Rules	Claire	Film debut
2016	Para el	Starring	Short film
2017	Paralelos	Starring	Short film
2021	Soy Luna: El último concierto	Herself/Jim Medina	Documentary film

=== Theater ===
Year	Title
2010	La sirenita
2014	Te vuelves demasiado viejo
2019	Detrás de la diputada
2019	Nunca pasa nada

== Tours ==
- Soy Luna en concierto (2017) - Latin American tour
- Soy Luna Live (2018) - European tour
- Soy Luna en vivo (2018) - Latin American tour

== Books ==
- Jara, Ana (4 June 2019). Soy muchas cosas en un cuerpo tan pequeño (in Spanish). Ediciones Martínez Roca. p. 160. ISBN 978-84-270-4595-8.

== Awards and nominations ==
Year	Awards	Category	Nominated work	Result	Ref(s)
2017	Fans Awards	Actriz Revelación	Soy Luna	Won	
