= Bomb Scared =

2017 film by Borja Cobeaga

- Spanish: Fe de etarras
- Directed by: Borja Cobeaga
- Written by: Diego San José; Borja Cobeaga
- Starring: Javier Cámara; Julián López; Miren Ibarguren
- Production companies: Deluxe Spain; Mediapro; Netflix
- Distributed by: Netflix
- Release date: October 12, 2017 (Spain)
- Running time: 89 minutes
- Country: Spain
- Language: Spanish

Bomb Scared (Spanish: Fe de etarras) (Note: A word play on Fe de erratas ('errata slip') and etarra (plural: etarras; 'ETA members').) is a 2017 Spanish black comedy film about four Basque ETA terrorists who are planning a terrorist attack in Spain. The film was released worldwide on October 12, 2017, by Netflix.

== Synopsis ==
Four Basque ETA terrorists, living together with peculiar Spanish neighbors, are planning a terrorist attack in Spain, but await a phone call with instructions from the head of the organization. It takes place in the summer of 2010 in a small Spanish town, when at the same time the Spain national football team wins the World Cup in South Africa and the whole country celebrating.

== Cast ==
- Javier Cámara as Martín
- Julián López as Pernando
- Miren Ibarguren as Ainara
- Gorka Otxoa as Álex
- Ramón Barea as Artexte
- Luis Bermejo as Armando
- Josean Bengoetxea as Benito
- Ane Gabarain as Beitia
- Tina Sáinz as Lourdes
- Bárbara Santa-Cruz as Natalia
