= The King of Havana =

- Theatrical release poster
- Spanish: El rey de La Habana
- Directed by: Agustí Villaronga
- Screenplay by: Agustí Villaronga
- Based on: El rey de La Habana by Pedro Juan Gutiérrez
- Produced by: Luisa Matienzo
- Starring: Maykol David Tortolo; Yordanka Ariosa; Héctor Medina
- Cinematography: Josep Mª Civit
- Edited by: Raúl Román
- Music by: Joan Valent
- Production companies: Pandora Cinema; Tusitala; El Rey de La Habana AIE; Esencia Films
- Distributed by: Filmax (es)
- Release dates: 23 September 2015 (San Sebastián); 16 October 2015 (Spain)
- Countries: Spain; Dominican Republic
- Language: Spanish

The King of Havana (Spanish: El rey de La Habana) is a 2015 Spanish-Dominican drama film directed by Agustí Villaronga which adapts Pedro Juan Gutiérrez's dirty realist novel El rey de La Habana. It stars Maykol David Tortolo, Yordanka Ariosa and Héctor Medina. It is set in the Cuban capital during the Special Period.

== Plot ==
Set in the Cuban capital during the Special Period, Reynaldo ('Rey'), returns to his old home in the wake of his escape from a juvenile prison, and wanders around Old Havana, meeting with prostitutes Magda and Yunisleidi.

== Cast ==
- Maykol David Tortoló Cepeda as Reynaldo
- Yordanka Ariosa as Magda
- Héctor Medina as Yunisleidi
- Chanel Terrero as Yamilé
- Jonathan Maravilla as Cheo
- Ileana Wilson as Fredesbinda
- José María Sánchez as enterrador
- Jean Luis Burgos
- Lia Chapman
- Celines Toribio
- Jazz Vilá

== Production ==
A joint Spain-Dominican Republic co-production, the film was produced by Pandora Cinema, Tusitala, AIE El Rey de La Habana and Esencia Films. Filming began on 16 April 2015 in the Dominican Republic and it had already wrapped by 4 May 2015.

Yordanka Ariosa said the sex scenes with Maykol David Tortoló, who was only sixteen at the time of filming, was one of the hardest things she has ever had to do.

Maykol David Tortoló revealed that his penis was digitally enlarged in some of his nude scenes.

== Release ==
The film screened at the 63rd San Sebastián International Film Festival on 23 September 2015. Distributed by Filmax, it opened in Spanish theatres on 16 October 2015.

== Reception ==
Guy Lodge of Variety deemed the film to be "an unabashedly torrid urban melodrama that will enrapture or repel viewers — or, quite possibly, both — with its upfront, up-in-your-face excess".

Neil Young of The Hollywood Reporter assessed the film to be "a two-hour immersion in poverty, squalor, sex, violence, prostitution and death", summing up as bottom line: "an extravagantly raunchy wallow in sordid poverty".

Lee Marshall of ScreenDaily considered that the film, guilty of using "shock tactics for effect", "can't help but leave a bad taste in the mouth at the end of its entertainingly sensationalist two-hour ride".

Jordi Costa of El País, wrote about the film's brutal story, in which "the small outbreaks of human warmth" "make the blunt and desperate outcome to have an outright annihilating effect.

== Accolades ==
Year	Award	Category	Nominee(s)	Result	Ref.
2015	63rd San Sebastián International Film Festival	Silver Shell for Best Actress	Yordanka Ariosa	Won	
2016	8th Gaudí Awards	Best Non-Catalan language Film		Nominated	
2016	8th Gaudí Awards	Best Director	Agustí Villaronga	Nominated	
2016	8th Gaudí Awards	Best Screenplay	Agustí Villaronga	Nominated	
2016	8th Gaudí Awards	Best Production Supervision	Josep Amorós, Carla Jovine	Nominated	
2016	8th Gaudí Awards	Best Art Direction	Alain Ortiz	Nominated	
2016	8th Gaudí Awards	Best Editing	Raúl Román	Won	
2016	8th Gaudí Awards	Best Original Score	Joan Valent	Won	
2016	8th Gaudí Awards	Best Cinematography	Josep Maria Civit	Won	
2016	8th Gaudí Awards	Best Costume Design	María Gil, Sonia Segura	Won	
2016	8th Gaudí Awards	Best Sound	Fernando Novillo, Franklin Hernández, Ricard Galceran	Nominated	
2016	8th Gaudí Awards	Best Visual Effects	Bernat Aragonés, Lluís Rivera	Nominated	
2016	8th Gaudí Awards	Best Makeup and Hairstyles	Ainhoa Eskisabel	Nominated	
2016	30th Goya Awards	Best Adapted Screenplay	Agustí Villaronga	Nominated	
2016	30th Goya Awards	Best New Actress	Yordanka Ariosa	Nominated	
2016	30th Goya Awards	Best Cinematography	Josep Mª Civit	Nominated	

== See also ==
- List of Spanish films of 2015
