= Love Storming =

- Theatrical release poster
- Spanish: No controles
- Directed by: Borja Cobeaga
- Written by: Diego San José; Borja Cobeaga
- Produced by: Tomás Cimadevilla; Mercedes Gamero
- Starring: Unax Ugalde; Alexandra Jiménez; Julián López; Miguel Ángel Muñoz; Mariam Hernández; Secun de la Rosa; Alfredo Silva; Ramón Barea; Mario Muñiz; Mariví Bilbao
- Cinematography: Aitor Mantxola
- Edited by: Raúl de Torres
- Music by: Aránzazu Calleja
- Production companies: Telespan 2000; Antena 3 Films; Sayaka Producciones Audiovisuales
- Distributed by: Vértice Cine
- Release dates: 27 November 2010 (FICX); 5 January 2011 (Spain)
- Country: Spain
- Language: Spanish

Love Storming (Spanish: No controles) is a 2010 Spanish comedy film directed by Borja Cobeaga and co-written by Diego San José. It stars Unax Ugalde, Alexandra Jiménez, and Julián López.

== Plot ==
With the onset of a massive snowstorm on 2010 New Year's Eve, flights are cancelled, and as passengers are forced to stay in a roadside hotel meanwhile, Sergio tries to win back former girlfriend Bea. Sergio's former schoolmate Juancarlitros steps in to offer him help.

== Cast ==
- Unax Ugalde as Sergio
- Alexandra Jiménez as Bea
- Julián López as Juancarlitros
- Miguel Ángel Muñoz as Ernesto
- Secun de la Rosa as Juanan
- Mariví Bilbao as abuela de Sergio
- Alfredo Silva as Jimmy
- Ramón Barea as padre de Sergio
- Mariam Hernández as Laura

== Production ==
The film was produced by Telespan 2000, Antena 3 Films, and Sayaka Producciones Audiovisuales. Shooting lasted for seven and a half weeks and took place in Bilbao and Madrid.

== Release ==
The film premiered as the closing film of the Gijón International Film Festival (FICX) on 27 November 2010. Distributed by Vértice Cine, it was released theatrically in Spain on 5 January 2011.

== Reception ==
Irene Crespo of Cinemanía rated the film 3 out of 5 stars, considering that with the gift entailed by the character of Juancarlitros, it is more than enough.

Pere Vall of Fotogramas rated the film 3 out of 5 stars, assessing that it finds in Juan Carlitros (a Julián López in a state of grace) the perfect antagonist to the sullen Sergio.

== See also ==
- List of Spanish films of 2011
