= La reina del pueblo =

Spanish television series

- Promotional poster
- Genre: Comedy
- Created by: Raúl Navarro
- Screenplay by: Raúl Navarro
- Directed by: Raúl Navarro
- Starring: Lucía Caraballo; Omar Banana; Ana Jara; Cristina Colom; Helena Ezquerro; Máximo Pastor; Melani Olivares; Roberto Álamo; Alberto Casado; Canco Rodríguez; Raúl Cimas
- Country of origin: Spain
- Original language: Spanish
- No. of seasons: 1
- No. of episodes: 6

Production
- Production companies: LACOproductora; Estela Films

Original release
- Network: ATRESplayer Premium
- Release: 27 June 2021

La reina del pueblo (transl. 'Queen of the Village') is a Spanish comedy streaming television series created, written and directed by Raúl Navarro for Flooxer. It was released on Atresplayer Premium on 27 June 2021. Starring Lucía Caraballo, Ana Jara, Omar Banana, Cristina Colom, Helena Ezquerro and Máximo Pastor, the series is set in the patronal festival of a fictional village.

== Premise ==
The plot, a coming-of-age comedy set in the fictional Spanish village of 'Polvaredas de la Sierra', concerns the competition for the award of queen of the local patronal festival, which pits Zaida against Inma, who wants to win the title before leaving the village to study at the university.

== Cast ==
- Lucía Caraballo as Inma
- Omar Banana as Javi
- Ana Jara as Estefi
- Cristina Colom as Nicole
- Helena Ezquerro as Zaida
- Máximo Pastor as Rober
- Melani Olivares as Estrella
- Roberto Álamo as Diego
- Alberto Casado as José Luis
- Canco Rodríguez as Manuel
- Raúl Cimas as el pregonero

== Production and release ==
Based on an original idea by Víctor Santos, the series was created, written and directed by Raúl Navarro. Produced by LACOproductora and Estela Films, shooting started by August 2020 in Noblejas (Toledo). Branded as a Flooxer original series, its full release on Atresplayer Premium was slated for 27 June 2021.

Series	Episodes	Originally released	Network	Ref.
1	6	27 June 2021	ATRESplayer Premium	

No.	Title	Directed by	Original release date
1	"Coronación"	Raúl Navarro	27 June 2021
2	"El pregón"	Raúl Navarro	27 June 2021
3	"La ofrenda"	Raúl Navarro	27 June 2021
4	"La paella"	Raúl Navarro	27 June 2021
5	"La batalla púrpura"	Raúl Navarro	27 June 2021
6	"Coronación (II)"	Raúl Navarro	27 June 2021
