= Vamos Juan =

Spanish television series

- Genre: Comedy; Political satire
- Created by: Diego San José
- Directed by: Víctor García León; Borja Cobeaga; Javier Cámara
- Starring: Javier Cámara; María Pujalte
- Country of origin: Spain
- Original language: Spanish
- No. of episodes: 7

Original release
- Network: TNT
- Release: 29 March 2020

Related
- Vota Juan; Venga Juan

Vamos Juan is a Spanish comedy television series starring Javier Cámara and María Pujalte. It is the sequel to Vota Juan. The plot concerns the attempts of Juan Carrasco to return to politics.

== Premise ==
Both Juan Carrasco (Javier Cámara) and Macarena Lombardo (María Pujalte) have returned to Logroño, where the former works as high school biology teacher, harassed by his students and the latter serves as editor for the local newspaper El Diario Logroñés. Meanwhile, Juan's personal secretary, Víctor (Adam Jezierski), has retained his position and continues working at the national government cabinet. Driven by spite, Juan seeks to return to politics, and rehire Macarena and enlists his daughter (Esty Quesada), as community manager.

== Cast ==
- Javier Cámara as Juan Carrasco.
- María Pujalte as Macarena Lombardo, Juan's director of communications.
- Adam Jezierski as Víctor Sanz, Juan's former personal secretary.
- Pedro Ángel Roca, former Juan's driver when he served as minister.
- Joaquín Climent as Luis Vallejo.
- Cristóbal Suárez as Recalde.
- Yaël Belicha as Juan's wife.
- Esty Quesada as Eva, Juan's daughter and community manager of the new party.
- Anna Castillo as Montse.
- José Manuel Cervino
- Alberto San Juan

== Production and release ==
The series was created by Diego San José. It was filmed in Logroño in October 2019. Directed by Víctor García León, Borja Cobeaga and Javier Cámara, the series' sixth episode, "Estambul Hadi Juan", was Cámara's debut as director. The seven-episode series premiered on 29 March 2020 on TNT.

== Awards and nominations ==
| Year | Award | Category | Nominee(s) | Result | Ref. |
|---|---|---|---|---|---|
| 2021 | 8th MiM Series Awards | Best Comedy Series | | Nominated | |
| 2021 | 8th MiM Series Awards | Best Direction | Víctor García León, Borja Cobeaga and Javier Cámara | Nominated | |
| 2021 | 8th MiM Series Awards | Best Comedy Actress | María Pujalte | Nominated | |
| 2021 | 8th Feroz Awards | Best Comedy Series | | Won | |
| 2021 | 8th Feroz Awards | Best Lead Actor in a TV Series | Javier Cámara | Nominated | |
| 2021 | 68th Ondas Awards | Best Comedy Series | | Jointly won (with Maricón perdido) | |
