= Barcelona Christmas Night =

- Theatrical release poster
- Catalan: Barcelona, nit d'hivern
- Directed by: Dani de la Orden
- Screenplay by: Eduard Sola; Daniel González; Eric Navarro
- Produced by: Dani de la Orden; Kike Maíllo; Bernat Saumell; Andreu Buenafuente
- Starring: Miki Esparbé; Bárbara Santa Cruz; Alberto San Juan; Alexandra Jiménez; Àlex Monner; Berto Romero; Vicky Luengo; Àlex Maruny; Yolanda Ramos; David Bagés; David Guapo; Laura de la Isla; José Corbacho; Clara Segura; Montserrat Carulla; Fanny Gautier; Fermí Reixach; Tina Sainz; Jordi Pérez; Mariano Venancio; Asunción Balaguer; Abel Folk; Artur Busquets; Aina Clotet; Cristian Valencia
- Cinematography: Ricard Canyellas
- Edited by: Alberto Gutiérrez
- Music by: Joan Dausà
- Production companies: Playtime Movies; El Terrat; Sábado Películas
- Distributed by: Splendor Films
- Release dates: 5 November 2015 (Most Festival); 4 December 2015 (Spain)
- Running time: 110 minutes
- Country: Spain
- Languages: Catalan; Spanish

Barcelona Christmas Night (Catalan: Barcelona, nit d'hivern) is a 2015 Spanish ensemble romantic comedy film directed by Dani de la Orden from a screenplay by Eduard Sola, Daniel González, and Eric Navarro.

It is a follow-up to Barcelona Summer Night (2013).

== Plot ==
Set in the Epiphany Eve (5–6 January) in Barcelona, the plot explores six love vignettes, including those of a man looking for his teen crush in a Wise King suit, the doubts of two guys in the face of the perspective of a trio with a girl, a married couple in crisis after the birth of their first child, and the relationship between two old women despite family reluctance.

== Cast ==
- Miki Esparbé as Carles
- Bárbara Santa-Cruz as Laura
- Àlex Monner as Jordi
- Alexandra Jiménez as Alba
- Berto Romero as Manel
- Montserrat Carulla as Carme
- Asunción Balaguer as Júlia
- Tina Sainz as mare de Laura ('Laura's mother')
- Clara Segura as Fina
- Mariano Venancio as pare de Laura ('Laura's father')
- Fermí Reixach as Jaume
- Abel Folk as Enric
- Cristian Valencia as Iván
- Fanny Gautier as noia francesa ('French girl')
- Alberto San Juan as Miguel
- Laura de la Isla as Anna
- Vicky Luengo as Olga
- Àlex Maruny as Óscar
- José Corbacho as Ernest
- Bernat Saumell as Oriol

== Production ==
The film is a Playtime Movies, El Terrat, and Sábado Películas production, and it had the association of TVC and the participation of TVE. It was shot in various locations across Barcelona.

== Release ==
The film opened the Most Festival on 5 November 2015. Distributed by Splendor Films, the film was released theatrically in Spain on 4 December 2015.

== Reception ==
Javier Ocaña of El País pointed out that De la Orden composes yet another "puzzle of intertwined stories", controlling somewhat better than in the first installment the "sometimes tiresome commercial aesthetics".

Toni Vall of Cinemanía rated the film 3 out of 5 stars, assessing that the film delivers "a visually appealing hodgepodge of improbable situations, simple tunes, and little to tell", underpinning a verdict reading "predictable and dignified in the most concrete and least offensive sense".

Quim Casas of El Periódico de Catalunya gave the film a 3-star rating, writing that the "risk is minimal, the characters are diverse, and everything appears overly designed and polished".

== Accolades ==
Year	Award	Category	Nominee(s)	Result	Ref.
2016	8th Gaudí Awards	Best Film		Nominated	
2016	8th Gaudí Awards	Best Director	Dani de la Orden	Nominated	
2016	8th Gaudí Awards	Best Screenplay	Eduard Sola, Daniel González, Eric Navarro	Nominated	
2016	8th Gaudí Awards	Best Supporting Actress	Aina Clotet	Nominated	
2016	8th Gaudí Awards	Best Supporting Actress	Clara Segura	Nominated	
2016	8th Gaudí Awards	Best Editing	Alberto Gutiérrez	Nominated	
2016	8th Gaudí Awards	Best Original Score	-Joan Dausà	Nominated	

== See also ==
- List of Spanish films of 2015
