= Friend Zone (2009 film) =

- Theatrical release poster
- Spanish: Pagafantas
- Directed by: Borja Cobeaga
- Written by: Borja Cobeaga; Diego San José
- Produced by: Tomás Cimadevilla; Mercedes Gamero
- Starring: Gorka Otxoa; Sabrina Garciarena; Julián López; Óscar Ladoire; Kiti Manver; María Asquerino; Michel Brown; Ernesto Sevilla; Bárbara Santa-Cruz
- Cinematography: Alfonso Postigo
- Edited by: Raúl de Torres
- Music by: Aránzazu Calleja
- Production companies: Manga Films; Telespan 2000; Antena 3 Films; Sayaka Producciones Audiovisuales
- Distributed by: Vertice Cine
- Release dates: 24 April 2009 (Málaga Film Festival); 3 July 2009 (Spain)
- Running time: 80 minutes
- Country: Spain
- Language: Spanish
- Budget: €2.5 million

Friend Zone (Spanish: Pagafantas, lit. 'Fanta buyer') is a 2009 Spanish romantic comedy film co-written and directed by Borja Cobeaga and starring Gorka Otxoa and Sabrina Garciarena.

== Premise ==
Chema has dumped his longtime girlfriend because he thinks he can do better, but after trying to date new girls, he is not very successful. When he meets Claudia, he thinks his luck has changed. She is pretty, funny, and seems interested in him. This apparent luck runs out when Sebastián, Claudia's actual boyfriend, comes over from Argentina and it becomes apparent that Claudia only wants Chema as her friend, so he is faced with the choice of giving up on a girl he does not stand a chance of getting, or waiting for the opportunity to present itself.

== Cast ==
- Gorka Otxoa as Chema
- Sabrina Garciarena as Claudia
- Óscar Ladoire as Jaime
- Michel Brown as Sebastián
- María Asquerino as Begoña
- Kiti Manver as Gloria
- Julián López as Rubén
- Ernesto Sevilla as Chema's cousin
- Bárbara Santa-Cruz as Elisa
- Mauro Muñiz as Iñaki

== Awards and nominations ==
=== 24th Goya Awards ===
Category	Recipient	Result
Best New Actor	Gorka Otxoa	Nominated
Best New Director	Borja Cobeaga	Nominated

== See also ==
- List of Spanish films of 2009
