= Venga Juan =

- Genre: Political satire
- Created by: Diego San José
- Directed by: Víctor García León; Tom Fernández; Pilar Palomero; Javier Cámara
- Starring: Javier Cámara
- Country of origin: Spain
- Original language: Spanish
- No. of seasons: 1
- No. of episodes: 8

Production
- Executive producers: Guillermo Farré; José Skaf; Miguel Salvat; Diego San José; Alejandro Flórez; Javier Méndez
- Running time: 30 min.
- Production company: 100 Balas

Original release
- Network: HBO Max
- Release: 28 November 2021

Related
- Vamos Juan

Venga Juan is a Spanish comedy television series created by Diego San José for HBO Max which stars Javier Cámara. It consists of a continuation of Vota Juan and Vamos Juan. It premiered on 28 November 2021.

== Premise ==
After his spell as minister and his return to local politics, Juan Carrasco (now with transplanted hair) has established himself as a board member of a big company. But his past comes to haunt him in the form of legal prosecution due to a corruption case he got involved with back when he was serving as Mayor of Logroño.

== Cast ==
- Javier Cámara as Juan Carrasco
- María Pujalte as Macarena, Carrasco's former director of communications.
- Adam Jezierski as Carrasco's former aide.
- Joaquín Climent as Vallejo
- Cristóbal Suárez as Recalde
- Yaël Belicha as Paula, Carrasco's wife.
- Esty Quesada as Eva, Carrasco's daughter.
- Óscar Martínez
- Manolo Solo
- Ramón Barea

== Production ==
Created by Diego San José, Venga Juan is the third part of the series formed by Vota Juan and Vamos Juan, both released on TNT in Spain in 2019 and 2020, respectively. Guillermo Farré, José Skaf and Miguel Salvat were credited as executive producers on behalf of WarnerMedia whereas Diego San José, Alejandro Flórez and Javier Méndez were credited as executive producers on behalf of 100 Balas (The Mediapro Studio). The writing team was formed by Diego San José (showrunner) together with Víctor García León, Daniel Castro, Pablo Remón, Diego Soto and Pilar Palomero, whereas the direction of the episodes was carried out by Víctor García León, Tom Fernández, Pilar Palomero and Javier Cámara. Shooting began in June 2021. In September 2021, the series was showcased together with other HBO Max originals (Todo lo otro, Sin novedad and ¡García!) at the 69th San Sebastián International Film Festival. It consists of 7 episodes.
