= Borja Cobeaga =

Spanish film director and screenwriter

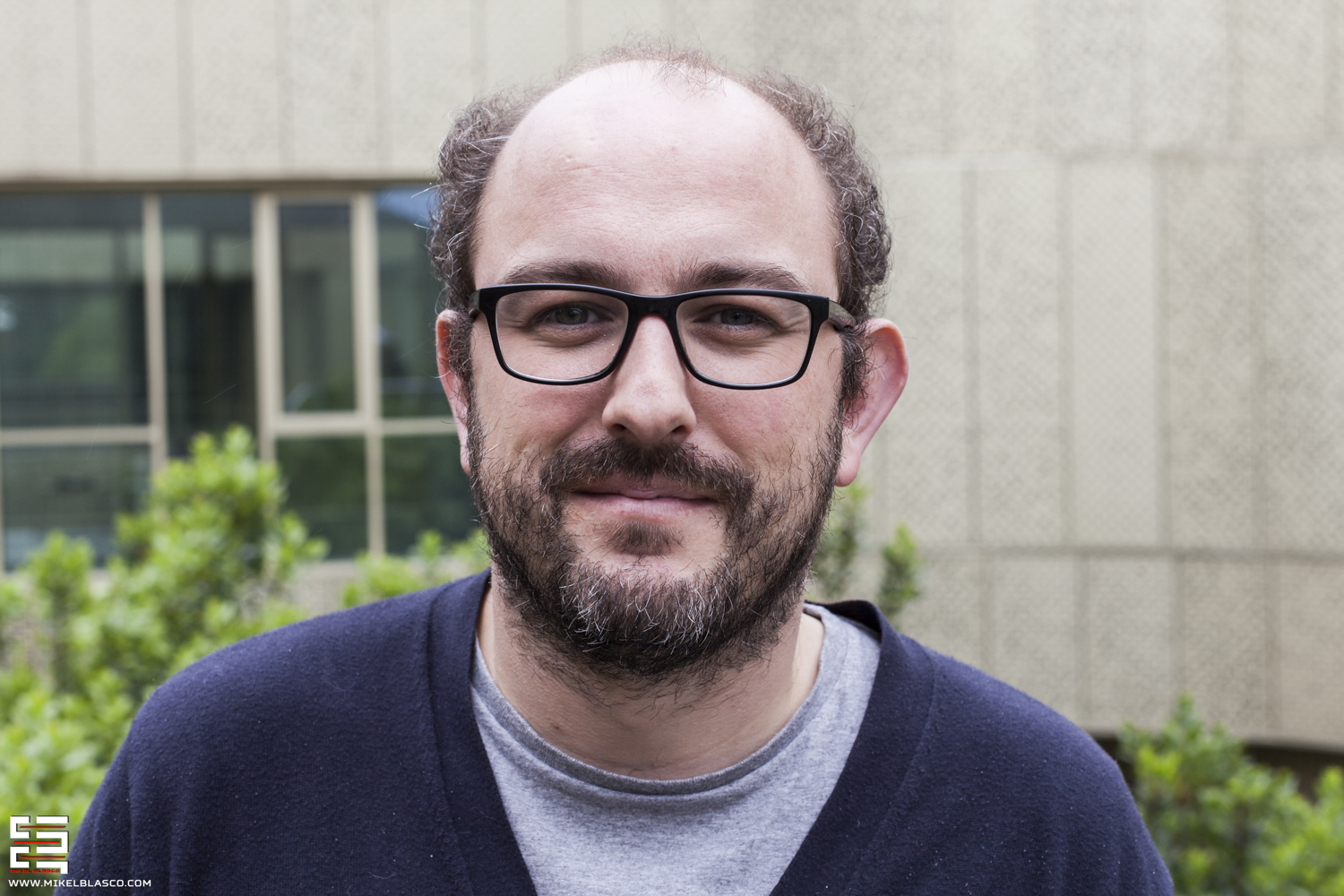
Borja Cobeaga in 2016.

Borja Cobeaga Eguillor (born 1977) is a Spanish film director and screenwriter. He was nominated for an Academy Award for Best Live Action Short Film for his 2005 film, One Too Many.

== Filmography ==
=== Feature films ===
Year	Film	Director	Writer	Notes
2009	Pagafantas	Yes	Yes	
2010	No controles	Yes	Yes	
2011	Amigos...	No	Yes	
2014	Ocho apellidos vascos	No	Yes	
2014	Negociador	Yes	Yes	Also producer
2015	Ocho apellidos catalanes	No	Yes	
2017	Fe de etarras	Yes	Yes	
2018	Superlópez	No	Yes	
2025	Los aitas	Yes	Yes	
2026	Altas capacidades	No	Yes	

=== Short films ===
Year	Film	Director	Writer	Notes
1994	Sangre suicida	Yes	Yes	
1995	Usura	Yes	Yes	
1996	El principio del fin	Yes	Yes	
1998	Cupido es áspero	Yes	Yes	
1999	El amor en tiempos de burocracia	Yes	Yes	Also assistant producer
2001	La primera vez	Yes	Yes	
2005	Éramos pocos	Yes	Yes	
2007	Limoncello	Yes	Yes	Also co-producer
2009	Marco incomparable	Yes	Yes	
2010	Un novio de mierda	Yes	Yes	
2013	Democracia	Yes	No	Also producer and editor
2016	Milagros y Remedios	Yes	No	Advertising short part of the series "En Tu Cabeza"
2016	Bidexka	Yes	Yes	Segment of the Anthology film "Kalebegiak"
2017	Zanahorio	Yes	No	

=== Television ===
Year	Film	Director	Writer	Notes
2005	Splunge	No	Yes	
2006	En Buena Compañia	No	Yes	5 episodes
2014	Aupa Jousu	Yes	No	TV Pilot; Also executive producer
2016	El Ministerio del Tiempo	No	Yes	Episode "Tiempo de lo Oculto"
2018	Festival de Cine de San Sebastián 2018: Gala de Inaguración	Yes	Yes	TV special Co-directed with Borja Echevarría & Diego San José
2018	Festival de Cine de San Sebastián 2018: Gala de Clausura	Yes	Yes	TV special Co-directed with Borja Echevarría & Diego San José
2019	Justo Antes de Cristo	Yes	No	3 episodes
2020	Vamos Juan	Yes	No	3 episodes
2022	No me gusta conducir	Yes	Yes	6 episodes Also creator and executive producer
