= Diego San José =

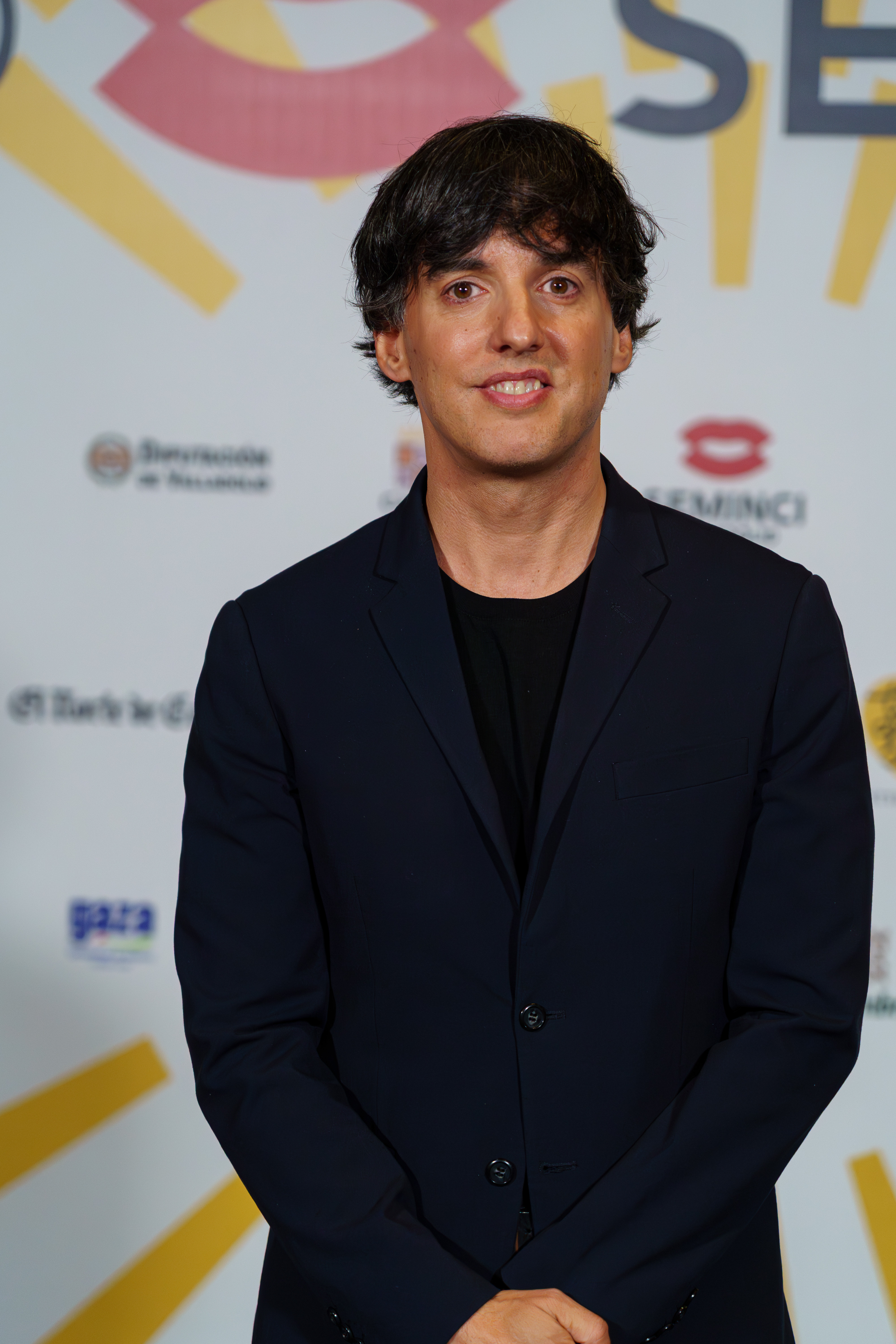
- San José in 2025
- Born: Diego San José Castellano; 13 October 1978 (age 47); Irun, Spain
- Occupation: Screenwriter

Diego San José Castellano (born 13 October 1978) is a Spanish screenwriter. He has often worked in tandem with Borja Cobeaga.

== Life and career ==
Diego San José Castellano was born on 13 October 1978 in Irun, Gipuzkoa. In 2003, he began his comedy career with the sketch show Vaya semanita, aired on the Basque public broadcaster ETB, and in which he worked along with Borja Cobeaga. He resumed collaboration with the latter in films such as Friend Zone (2009), Love Storming (2011), Negotiator (2014), Spanish Affair (2014), Spanish Affair 2 (2015), Bomb Scared (2017), and Superlópez (2018). He has also created series such as Vota Juan, Vamos Juan, Venga Juan, Celeste, and Yakarta.
