= Javier Cámara =

Spanish actor (born 1967)

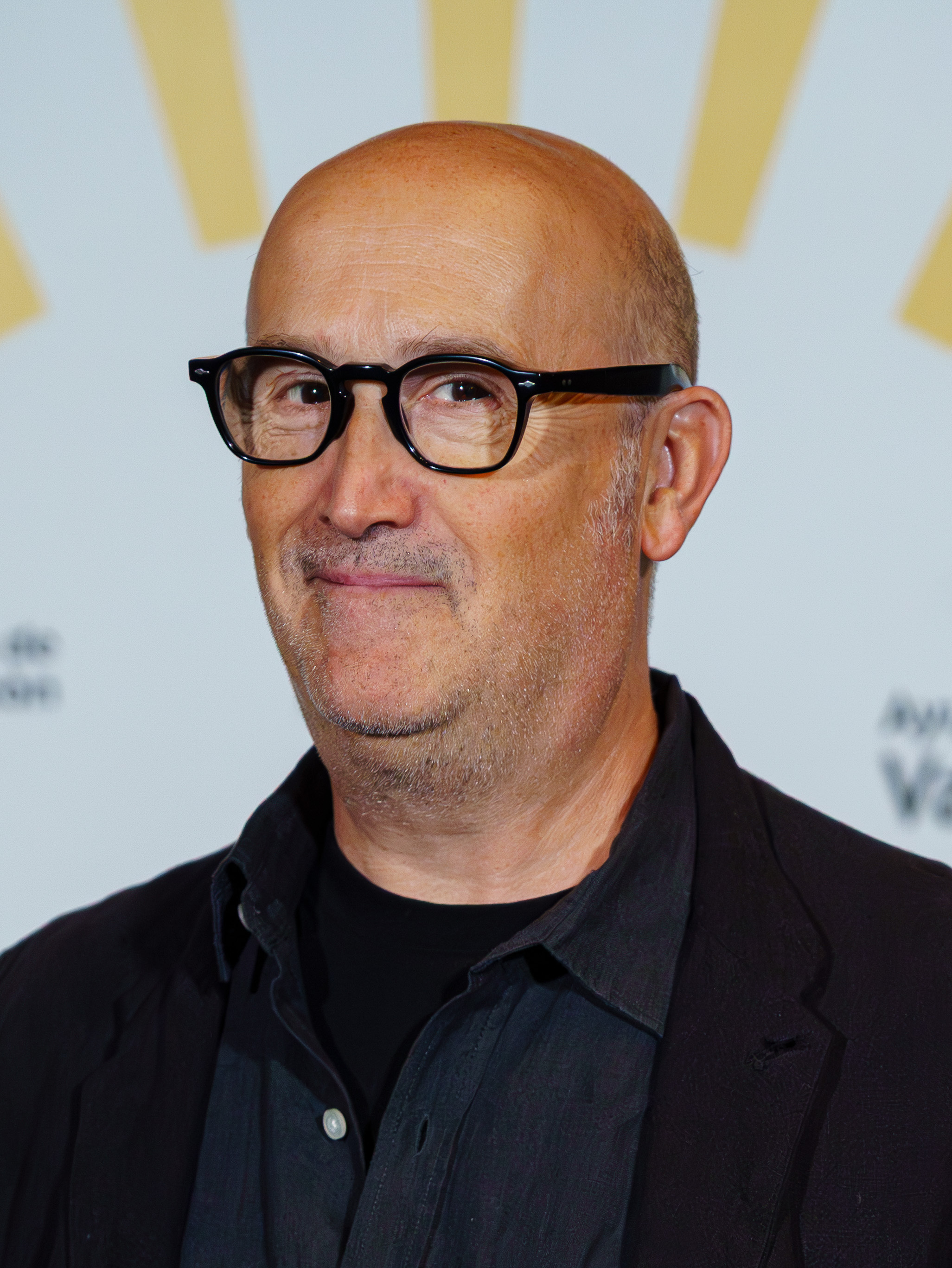
- Cámara in 2025
- Born: Javier Cámara Rodríguez; 19 January 1967 (age 59); Albelda de Iregua, Spain
- Education: RESAD
- Occupation: Actor
- Years active: 1991–present

Javier Cámara Rodríguez (born 19 January 1967) is a Spanish actor. He is the recipient of multiple accolades, including two Goya Awards.

He became known for two television roles as a priest in ¡Ay, señor, señor! and Éste es mi barrio. He has since featured in films such as Torrente, the Dumb Arm of the Law (which earned him wide public recognition in Spain), Talk to Her, Torremolinos 73, Living Is Easy with Eyes Closed, Truman and Forgotten We'll Be.

Other television credits include performances in series such as 7 vidas, The Young Pope and The New Pope (portraying a cleric again) or Narcos, likewise starring as the title character in the Juan Carrasco politico-satirical saga (Vota Juan, Vamos Juan and Venga Juan).

== Early life ==
Javier Cámara Rodríguez was born on 19 January 1967 in Albelda de Iregua.. He began his training in the theatre group at IES Laboral (his high school) and Logroño's Theatre School, later moving to Madrid to train at the RESAD. He worked as an usher at the Fígaro Theatre, so he could pay for his education.

== Career ==
In 1991, Cámara made his debut in a stage play of the Spanish National Classical Theatre Company, El caballero de Olmedo, directed by Miguel Narros, whereas his feature film debut came with a performance in Fernando Colomo's 1993 film Rosa Rosae.

Following his two first major television roles (as a priest) that made him known, in ¡Ay, Señor, Señor! (1994–1995), portraying Father Ángel Murillo and Éste es mi barrio (1996–1997), portraying Don Justo, he earned wide public visibility in Spain with his performance in 1998 dark comedy film and box-office hit Torrente, el brazo tonto de la ley, portraying Rafi, the sidekick of antihero José Luis Torrente, earning a nomination to the Goya Award for Best New Actor.

In the miniseries Jakarta (2025), Cámara portrayed a former badminton olympian and a "textbook loser" coaching a teenage prospect.

== Filmography ==
=== Film ===
Year	Title	Role	Notes	Ref.
1993	Rosa Rosae	Encargado	Feature film debut	
1997	Corazón loco	Segura		
1998	Torrente, el brazo tonto de la ley (Torrente, the Dumb Arm of the Law)	Rafi		
1999	Cuarteto de la Habana	Segis		
2001	Lucía y el sexo (Sex and Lucia)	Pepe		
2002	Hable con ella (Talk to Her)	Benigno		
2003	Torremolinos 73	Alfredo López		
2003	Los abajo firmantes (With George Bush on My Mind)	Mario		
2004	La mala educación (Bad Education)	Paca / Paquito		
2005	The Secret Life of Words	Simon		
2005	Malas temporadas (Hard Times)	Mikel		
2006	Alatriste	Conde Duque de Olivares		
2006	Paris, je t'aime			
2007	La torre de Suso (Suso's Tower)	Cundo		
2008	Fuera de carta (Chef's Special)	Maxi		
2008	Los girasoles ciegos (The Blind Sunflowers)	Ricardo		
2010	Que se mueran los feos (To Hell with the Ugly)	Eliseo		
2011	¿Para qué sirve un oso?	Guillermo		
2012	Una pistola en cada mano (A Gun in Each Hand)	S.		
2013	Los amantes pasajeros (I'm So Excited)	Joserra		
2013	Vivir es fácil con los ojos cerrados (Living Is Easy with Eyes Closed)	Antonio San Román		
2014	La vida inesperada (The Unexpected Life)	Juanito		
2015	Truman	Tomás		
2016	La reina de España (The Queen of Spain)	Pepe Bonilla		
2017	Es por tu bien (It's for Your Own Good)	Chus		
2017	Fe de etarras (Bomb Scared)	Martín		
2018	Ola de crímenes (Crime Wave)			
2020	El olvido que seremos (Forgotten We'll Be)	Héctor Abad Gómez		
2020	Sentimental (The People Upstairs)	Julio		
2022	Historias para no contar (Stories Not to Be Told)	David		
2026	Torrente, presidente (Torrente for President)	Rafi	Cameo	
2026	53 domingos (53 Sundays)	Julián		
2026	5 minutos más (5 More Minutes)	Carlos		

=== Television ===
Year	Title	Role	Notes	Ref
1994–1995	¡Ay, señor, señor!	Padre Ángel Murillo		
1996–1997	Éste es mi barrio	Don Justo		
1999–2006	7 vidas	Paco Gimeno Huete	Main (88 episodes); guest (season 15)	
2016	The Young Pope	Monsignor/Cardinal Bernardo Gutierrez		
2017	Narcos	Guillermo Pallomari	Introduced in season 3	
2019	Vota Juan	Juan Carrasco		
2020	The New Pope	Cardinal Bernardo Gutiérrez	Reprise of role in The Young Pope	
2020	Vamos Juan	Juan Carrasco	Reprise or role in Vota Juan	
2021	Venga Juan	Juan Carrasco	Reprise of role in Vamos Juan	
2022	Rapa	Tomás		
2025	Yakarta (Jakarta)	José Ramón Garrido		

== Accolades ==
Year	Award	Category	Work	Result	Ref.
1999	13th Goya Awards	Best New Actor	Torrente, the Dumb Arm of the Law	Nominated	
2002	15th European Film Awards	Best Actor	Talk to Her	Nominated	
2002	15th European Film Awards	People's Choice Award for Best Actor	Talk to Her	Won	
2003	17th Goya Awards	Best Actor	Talk to Her	Nominated	
2004	18th Goya Awards	Best Actor	Torremolinos 73	Nominated	
2005	14th Actors and Actresses Union Awards	Best Film Actor in a Minor Role	Bad Education	Won	
2006	20th Goya Awards	Best Supporting Actor	The Secret Life of Words	Nominated	
2006	15th Actors and Actresses Union Awards	Best Film Actor in a Leading Role	Malas temporadas	Nominated	
2006	15th Actors and Actresses Union Awards	Best Film Actor in a Minor Role	The Secret Life of Words	Nominated	
2009	23rd Goya Awards	Best Actor	Chef's Special	Nominated	
2013	68th CEC Medals	Best Supporting Actor	A Gun in Each Hand	Nominated	
2014	19th Forqué Awards	Best Actor	Living Is Easy with Eyes Closed	Nominated	
2014	1st Feroz Awards	Best Actor	Living Is Easy with Eyes Closed	Nominated	
2014	69th CEC Medals	Best Actor	Living Is Easy with Eyes Closed	Won	
2014	6th Gaudí Awards	Best Actor	Yesterday Never Ends	Nominated	
2014	28th Goya Awards	Best Actor	Living Is Easy with Eyes Closed	Won	
2015	2nd Feroz Awards	Best Actor	The Unexpected Life	Nominated	
2015	70th CEC Medals	Best Actor	The Unexpected Life	Nominated	
2016	21st Forqué Awards	Best Actor in a Film	Truman	Nominated	
2016	3rd Feroz Awards	Best Actor	Truman	Nominated	
2016	8th Gaudí Awards	Best Supporting Actor	Truman	Won	
2016	30th Goya Awards	Best Supporting Actor	Truman	Won	
2016	25th Actors and Actresses Union Awards	Best Film Actor in a Secondary Role	Truman	Nominated	
2016	29th European Film Awards	Best Actor	Truman	Nominated	
2020	29th Actors and Actresses Union Awards	Best Television Actor in a Leading Role	Vota Juan	Won	
2020	7th Platino Awards	Best Actor in a Miniseries or TV series	Vota Juan	Nominated	
2021	26th Forqué Awards	Best Actor in a Film	The People Upstairs	Won	
2021	26th Forqué Awards	Best Actor in a Series	Vamos Juan	Nominated	
2021	76th CEC Medals	Best Actor	The People Upstairs	Nominated	
2021	8th Platino Awards	Best Actor	Forgotten We'll Be	Won	
2021	9th Macondo Awards	Best Actor	Forgotten We'll Be	Nominated	
2021	27th Forqué Awards	Best Actor in a Series	Venga Juan	Won	
2022	9th Feroz Awards	Best Main Actor in a Series	Venga Juan	Won	
2022	30th Actors and Actresses Union Awards	Best Television Actor in a Leading Role	Venga Juan	Won	
2022	9th Platino Awards	Best Actor in a Miniseries or TV series	Venga Juan	Won	
2022	28th Forqué Awards	Best Actor in a Series	Rapa	Nominated	
2023	10th Feroz Awards	Best Actor in a Series	Rapa	Nominated	
2023	29th Forqué Awards	Best Actor in a Series	Rapa	Nominated	
2024	11th Feroz Awards	Best Actor in a Series	Rapa	Nominated	
2024	30th Forqué Awards	Best Actor in a Series	Rapa	Nominated	
2025	31st Forqué Awards	Best Actor in a Series	Jakarta	Won	
2026	13th Feroz Awards	Best Main Actor in a Series	Jakarta	Won	
2026	34th Actors and Actresses Union Awards	Best Television Actor in a Leading Role	Jakarta	Nominated	
2026	13th Platino Awards	Best Actor in a Miniseries or TV Series	Jakarta	Nominated	
2026	74th San Sebastián International Film Festival	Silver Shell for Best Supporting Performance	5 More Minutes	Won	
2026	54th International Emmy Awards	Best Performance by an Actor	Jakarta	Pending	
