= Víctor García León =

Spanish filmmaker (born 1976)

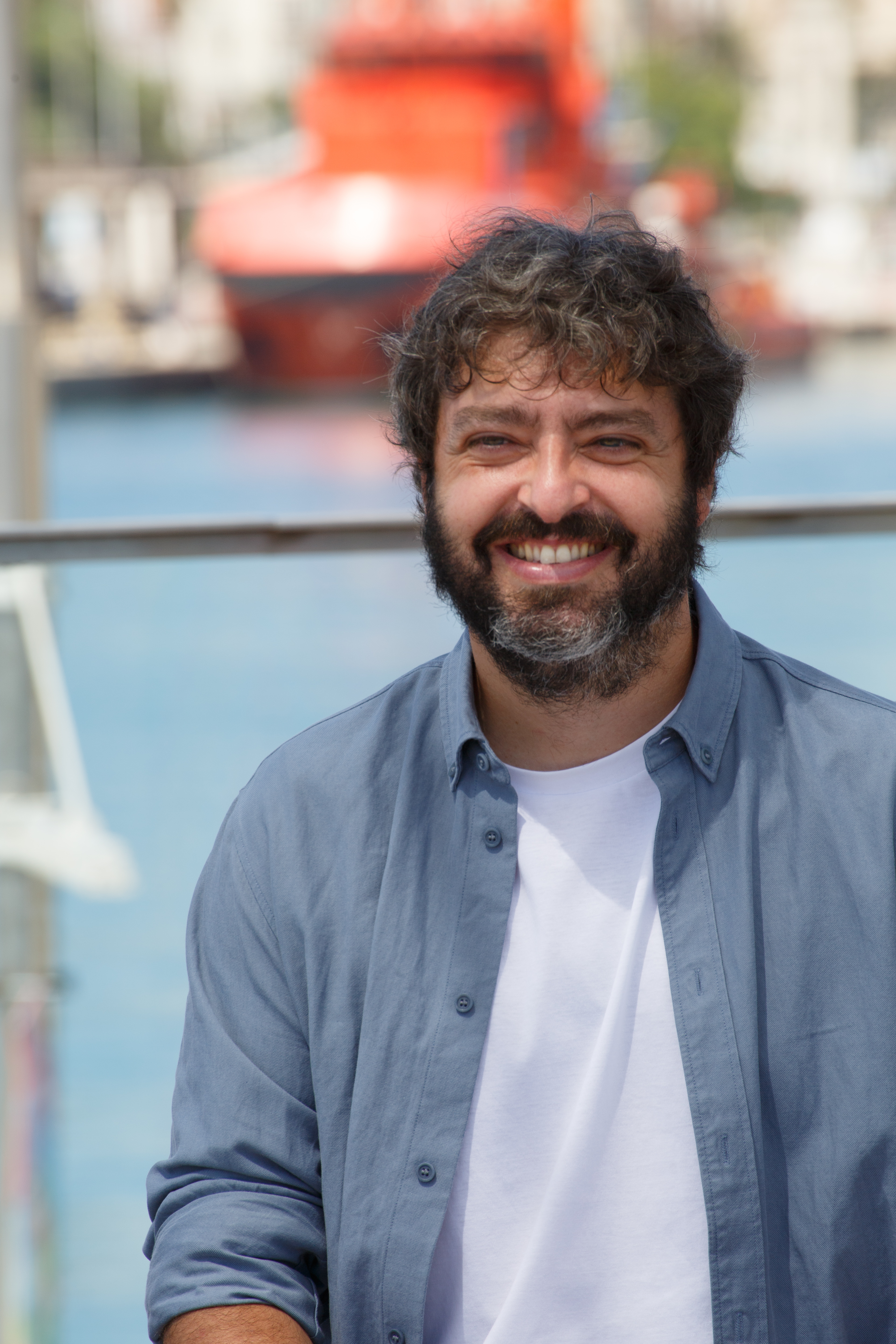
At the 2020 Málaga Film Festival.

Víctor García León (born 1976) is a Spanish filmmaker.

== Biography ==
Born in Madrid in 1976, he is the son of film director José Luis García Sánchez and singer Rosa León. He made his directorial debut in a feature film with the 2001 teen drama No Pain, No Gain, which earned him a nomination to the Goya Award for Best New Director. The latter was followed by Go Away from Me (2006), Selfie (2017), The Europeans (2020), and ¡Vaya vacaciones! (2023). He has also worked in television series such as the Juan Carrasco television saga (Vota Juan, Vamos Juan, and Venga Juan), The Neighbor, and Los hombres de Paco.
