= Vota Juan =

Spanish television series

- Genre: Comedy; Political satire
- Created by: Juan Cavestany; Diego San José
- Directed by: David Serrano; Víctor García León
- Starring: Javier Cámara; María Pujalte
- Country of origin: Spain
- Original language: Spanish
- No. of seasons: 1
- No. of episodes: 8

Production
- Running time: 30 minutes
- Production companies: 100 Balas; TNT España

Original release
- Network: TNT España
- Release: 25 January – 15 February 2019

Related
- Vamos Juan

Vota Juan (transl. 'Vote for Juan') is a Spanish comedy television series created Juan Cavestany and Diego San José. Produced by 100 Balas (Mediapro), the first season of the series consists of eight thirty-minute episodes that began airing on TNT España on 25 January 2019. The series was renewed for a second season, which was released as a sequel series with the new title Vamos Juan on 29 March 2020.

== Premise ==
Set in the world of Spanish politics, Vota Juan revolves around the character of Juan Carrasco (Javier Cámara), a Minister of Agriculture who, after finding his political ambitions awoken by a series of chance political events, decides to take part in his party's primary elections thereby giving himself a chance to eventually run for the position of President of the Government. Party intrigues, jealousy, crises... as he undertakes this task he will count on the help of his press chief, his secretary and his personal advisor. His campaign team, much like him, try to make up for their lack of experience and political expertise through a mixture of guile and a whole host of other shenanigans.

== Cast ==
- Javier Cámara as Juan Carrasco
- María Pujalte as Macarena Lombardo
- Nuria Mencía as Carmen Müller
- Adam Jezierski as Víctor Sanz
- Joaquín Climent as Luis Vallejo
- Yaël Belicha as Paula
- Esty Quesada as Eva Carrasco
- Pedro Ángel Roca
- Mona Martínez
- Algis Arlaukas

== Episodes ==
Season	Episodes	Originally released	
Season	Episodes	First released	Last released
1	8	January 25, 2019	February 15, 2019

=== Season 1 (2019) ===
No. overall	No. in season	Title	Directed by	Written by	Original release date	U.S. viewers (millions)
1	1	"Episodio 1"	David Serrano	Unknown	January 25, 2019	N/A
2	2	"Episodio 2"	David Serrano	Unknown	January 25, 2019	N/A
3	3	"Episodio 3"	David Serrano	Unknown	February 1, 2019	N/A
4	4	"Episodio 4"	David Serrano	Unknown	February 1, 2019	N/A
5	5	"Episodio 5"	Víctor García León	Unknown	February 8, 2019	N/A
6	6	"Episodio 6"	Víctor García León	Unknown	February 8, 2019	N/A
7	7	"Episodio 7"	Víctor García León	Unknown	February 15, 2019	N/A
8	8	"Episodio 8"	Víctor García León	Unknown	February 15, 2019	N/A
