= Silver Shell for Best Supporting Performance =

San Sebastián International Film Festival Award

- Awarded for: Best Supporting Performance
- Country: Spain
- Presented by: San Sebastián International Film Festival
- First award: 2021
- Currently held by: Pierre Lottin for When Fall Is Coming
- Website: sansebastianfestival.com

The Silver Shell for Best Supporting Performance (Spanish: Concha de plata a la mejor interpretación de reparto; Basque: Taldeko interpretazio onenaren zilarrezko maskorra) is one of the main awards presented at the San Sebastián International Film Festival to the Best Supporting Performance of a competing film. In 2021, the San Sebastián International Film Festival announced that the two acting categories would be retired, and replaced with one gender-neutral category, with both Best Actor and Best Actress merging into the Best Leading Performance and Best Supporting Performance category.

== Winners ==
Year	Actor	Film title	Ref
2021 (69th)	Ensemble cast of Who's Stopping Us		
2022 (70th)	Renata Lerman	The Substitute	
2023 (71st)	Hovik Keuchkerian	Un amor	
2024 (72nd)	Pierre Lottin	When Fall Is Coming	
2025 (73rd)	Camila Pláate	Belén	
2026 (74th)	Javier Cámara	5 More Minutes	

== See also ==
- Golden Shell for Best Film
- Silver Shell for Best Director
- Silver Shell for Best Leading Performance
- Donostia Award
- Sebastiane Award
