= Silver Shell for Best Actress =

Award at the San Sebastián Intl. Film Festival

The Silver Shell for Best Actress (Spanish: Concha de Plata a la mejor actriz; Basque: Aktore onenaren Zilarrezko Maskorra) was one of the main awards presented at the San Sebastián International Film Festival to the Best Actress of a competing film. The last of this award was given out in 2020, after which it was replaced with a gender-neutral Silver Shell for Best Leading Performance and Silver Shell for Best Supporting Performance the following year.

== Winners ==
Year	Actress	Film title	Ref
1953	Julita Martínez	There's a Road on the Right	
1954	Marisa de Leza	La patrulla	
1956	Luisa Della Noce	The Railroad Man	
1957	Giulietta Masina	Nights of Cabiria	
1958	Jacqueline Sassard	March's Child	
1959	Audrey Hepburn	The Nun's Story	
1960	Joanne Woodward	The Fugitive Kind	
1961	Pina Pellicer	One-Eyed Jacks	
1962	Anne Bancroft	The Miracle Worker	
1963	Lee Remick	Days of Wine and Roses	
1964	Ava Gardner	The Night of the Iguana	
1965	Lilli Palmer	Operation Crossbow	
1966	Evangelina Salazar	Arm in Arm Down the Street	
1967	Serena Vergano	A Love Story	
1968	Monica Vitti	The Girl with the Pistol	
1969	Stefania Sandrelli	The Bandit	
1969	Lyudmila Chursina	A Little Crane	
1970	Stéphane Audran	Le Boucher	
1971	Graciela Borges	Crónica de una Señora	
1972	Mia Farrow	Follow Me!	
1973	Glenda Jackson	A Touch of Class	
1973	Françoise Fabian	Happy New Year	
1974	Sophia Loren	The Voyage	
1975	Gena Rowlands	A Woman Under the Influence	
1976	Helen Morse	Caddie	
1977	Katherine Hunter	The Girl's War	
1978	Carol Burnett	A Wedding	
1979	Laura Betti	Il piccolo Archimede	
1985	Mercedes Sampietro	Extramuros	
1986	Angela Molina	Half of Heaven	
1987	Victoria Abril	El Lute (Run for Your Life)	
1988	Cipe Lincovski	The Girlfriend	
1988	Liv Ullmann	The Girlfriend	
1989	Mirjana Jokovic	Eversmile, New Jersey	
1990	Margherita Buy	The Week of the Sphinx	
1991	Deborra-Lee Furness	Waiting	
1991	Noni Hazlehurst	Waiting	
1991	Helen Jones	Waiting	
1991	Fiona Press	Waiting	
1992	Krystyna Janda	Zwolnieni z zycia	
1993	Niki Karimi	Sara	
1994	Ning Jing	Red Firecracker, Green Firecracker	
1995	Victoria Abril	Nobody Will Speak of Us When We're Dead	
1996	Norma Aleandro	Autumn Sun	
1997	Julie Christie	Afterglow	
1998	Jeanne Balibar	Late August, Early September	
1999	Aitana Sánchez-Gijón	Volavérunt	
2000	Carmen Maura	La Comunidad	
2001	Pilar López de Ayala	Mad Love	
2002	Mercedes Sampietro	Common Ground	
2003	Laia Marull	Take My Eyes	
2004	Connie Nielsen	Brødre	
2005	Ana Geislerová	Something Like Happiness	
2006	Nathalie Baye	Mon fils à moi	
2007	Blanca Portillo	Seven Billiard Tables	
2008	Melissa Leo	Frozen River	
2008	Tsilla Chelton	Pandora's Box	
2009	Lola Dueñas	Me Too	
2010	Nora Navas	Black Bread	
2011	María León	The Sleeping Voice	
2012	Macarena Garcia	Blancanieves	
2012	Katie Coseni	Foxfire: Confessions of a Girl Gang	
2013	Marian Álvarez	Wounded	
2014	Paprika Steen	Silent Heart	
2015	Yordanka Ariosa	The King of Havana	
2016	Fan Bingbing	I Am Not Madam Bovary	
2017	Sofia Gala Castiglione	Alanis	
2018	Pia Tjelta	Blind Spot	
2019	Greta Fernández	A Thief's Daughter	
2019	Nina Hoss	The Audition	
2020	Ia Sukhitashvili	Beginning	

== See also ==
- Golden Shell for Best Film
- Silver Shell for Best Director
- Silver Shell for Best Actor
- Donostia Award
- Sebastiane Award
