= Silver Shell for Best Actor =

San Sebastián International Film Festival Award

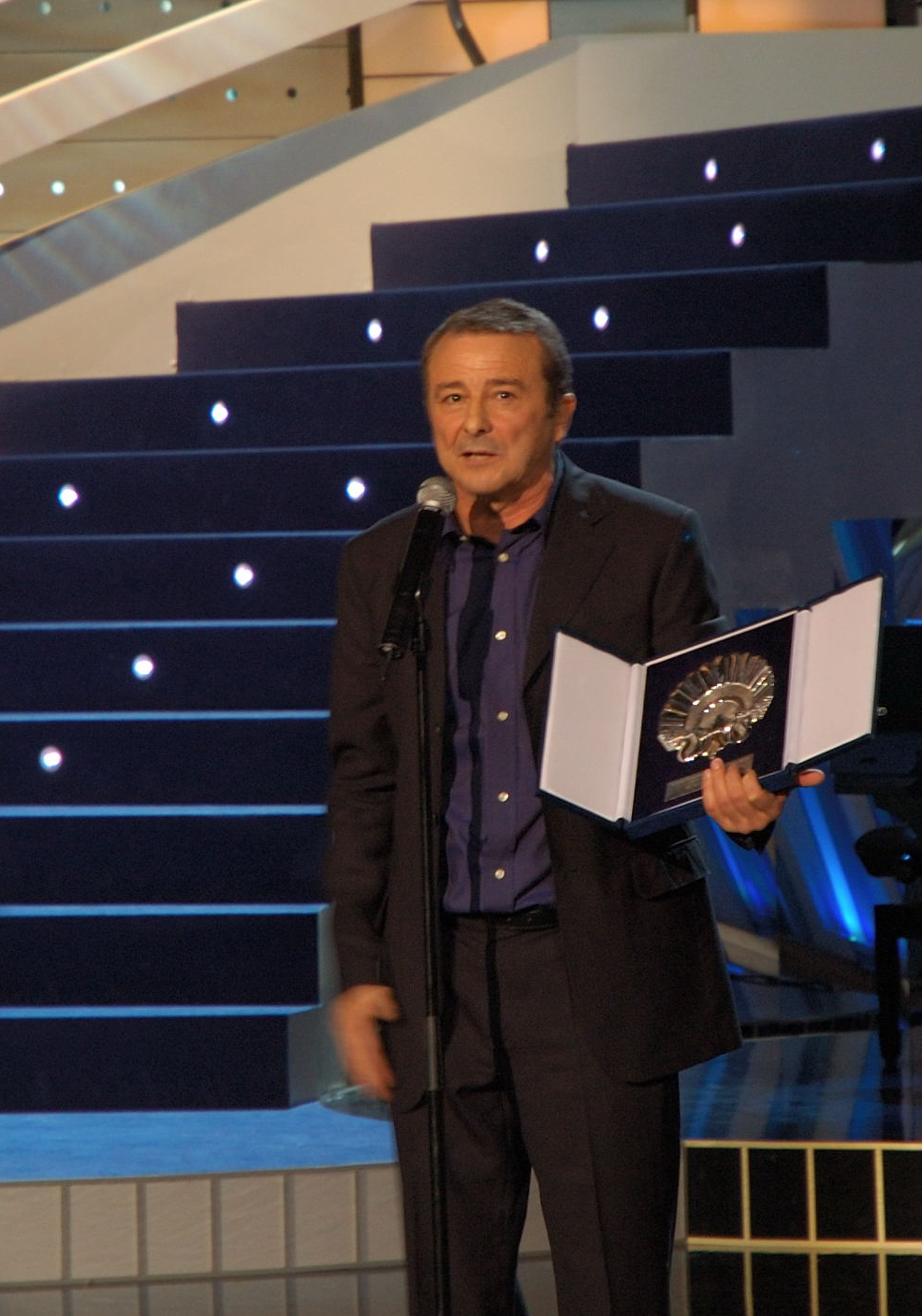
Spanish actor Juan Diego receiving the Silver Shell for Best Actor at the San Sebastian Film Festival, 2006.

The Silver Shell for Best Actor (Spanish: Concha de Plata a la Mejor Interpretacion Masculina; Basque: Aktore onenaren Zilarrezko Maskorra) was one of the main awards presented at the San Sebastián International Film Festival to the Best Actor of a competing film. The last of this award was given out in 2020, after which it was replaced with a gender-neutral Silver Shell for Best Leading Performance and Silver Shell for Best Supporting Performance the following year.

== Award winners ==
Year	Actor(s)	Film title
1953	Francisco Rabal	There's a Road on the Right
1954	Enrique Alvarez Diosdado	Viento del norte
1956	Otto Eduard Hasse	Canaris (Foreign Film)
1956	Alberto Closas	We're All Necessary (Spanish Film)
1957	Charles Vanel	Burning Fuse
1958	Kirk Douglas	The Vikings
1958	James Stewart	Vertigo
1959	Adolfo Marsillach	Salto a la Gloria (Leap to Fame)
1960	Richard Attenborough	League of Gentleman
1960	Jack Hawkins	League of Gentleman
1960	Bryan Forbes	League of Gentleman
1960	Roger Livesey	League of Gentleman
1960	Nigel Patrick	League of Gentleman
1961	Gert Fröbe	Crook and the Cross
1962	Peter Sellers	The Waltz of the Toreadors
1963	Jack Lemmon	Days of Wine and Roses
1964	Richard Attenborough	Séance on a Wet Afternoon
1964	Maurice Biraud	Les Aventures de Salavin
1965	Marcello Mastroianni	Casanova 70
1966	Frank Finlay	Othello
1967	John Mills	The Family Way
1967	Maurice Ronet	Le Scandale
1968	Sidney Poitier	For Love of Ivy
1968	Claude Rich	Je t’aime, je t’aime
1969	Nicol Williamson	Laughter in the Dark
1970	Innokenti Smoktounovsky	Tchaikovsky
1970	Zoltán Latinovits	Utazás a koponyám körül
1971	Vittorio Gassman	Brancaleone at the Crusades
1972	Fernando Rey	La duda
1972	Topol	Follow Me!
1973	Lino Ventura	Happy New Year
1973	Giancarlo Giannini	Sono stato io
1974	Martin Sheen	Badlands
1975	Al Pacino	Dog Day Afternoon
1976	Zdzisław Kozień	Skazany
1977	Héctor Alterio	A un dios desconocido
1978	José Sacristán	Un hombre llamado Flor de Otoño
1979	Nelson Villagra	Prisioneros desaparecidos
1985	Piotr Siwkiewicz	Yesterday
1986	Ernesto Gómez Cruz	The Realm of Fortune
1987	Imanol Arias	El Lute: Run for Your Life
1988	Fernando Rey	Scent of a Crime; Winter Diary
1989	Ari Bery	Tusztorténet
1990	Mulie Jarju	Letters from Alou
1991	Silu Seppälä	Zombie and the Ghost Train
1992	Roberto Sosa	Highway Patrolman
1993	Juan Echanove	Madregilda
1994	Javier Bardem	Días contados El detective y la muerte
1995	Nicolas Cage	Leaving Las Vegas
1996	Michael Caine	Blood and Wine
1997	Federico Luppi	Martín (Hache)
1998	Ian McKellen	Gods and Monsters
1999	Jacques Dufilho	C'est quoi la vie?
2000	Gianfranco Brero	Tinta Roja
2001	Düzgün Ayhan	Escape to Paradise
2002	Liu Peiqi	Han Ni Zai Yiki
2003	Luis Tosar	Te Doy Mis Ojos
2004	Ulrich Thomsen	Brødre
2005	Juan José Ballesta	7 vírgenes
2006	Juan Diego	Vete de mí
2007	Henry O	A Thousand Years of Good Prayers
2008	Oscar Martínez	El nido vacío
2009	Pablo Pineda	Yo, también
2010	Conor McCarron	Neds
2011	Antonis Kafetzopoulos	Unfair World
2012	José Sacristán	The Dead Man and Being Happy
2013	Jim Broadbent	Le Week-End
2014	Javier Gutiérrez	Marshland
2015	Ricardo Darin	Truman
2015	Javier Cámara	Truman
2016	Eduard Fernández	Smoke & Mirrors
2017	Bogdan Dumitrache	Pororoca
2018	Darío Grandinetti	Rojo
2019	Bukassa Kabengele	Pacified
2020	Mads Mikkelsen	Another Round
2020	Thomas Bo Larsen	Another Round
2020	Magnus Millang	Another Round
2020	Lars Ranthe	Another Round

== See also ==
- Golden Shell for Best Film
- Silver Shell for Best Director
- Silver Shell for Best Actress
- Donostia Award
- Sebastiane Award
