= Silver Shell for Best Leading Performance =

San Sebastián International Film Festival Award

- Awarded for: Best Leading Performance
- Country: Spain
- Presented by: San Sebastián International Film Festival
- First award: 2021
- Website: sansebastianfestival.com

The Silver Shell for Best Leading Performance (Spanish: Concha de Plata a la mejor interpretación protagonista; Basque: Interpretazio nagusi onenaren Zilarrezko maskorra) is one of the main awards presented at the San Sebastián International Film Festival to the Best Leading Performance of a competing film. In 2021, the San Sebastián International Film Festival announced that the two acting categories would be retired, and replaced with one gender-neutral category, with both Best Actor and Best Actress merging into the Best Leading Performance and Best Supporting Performance category.

== Winners ==
=== 2020s ===
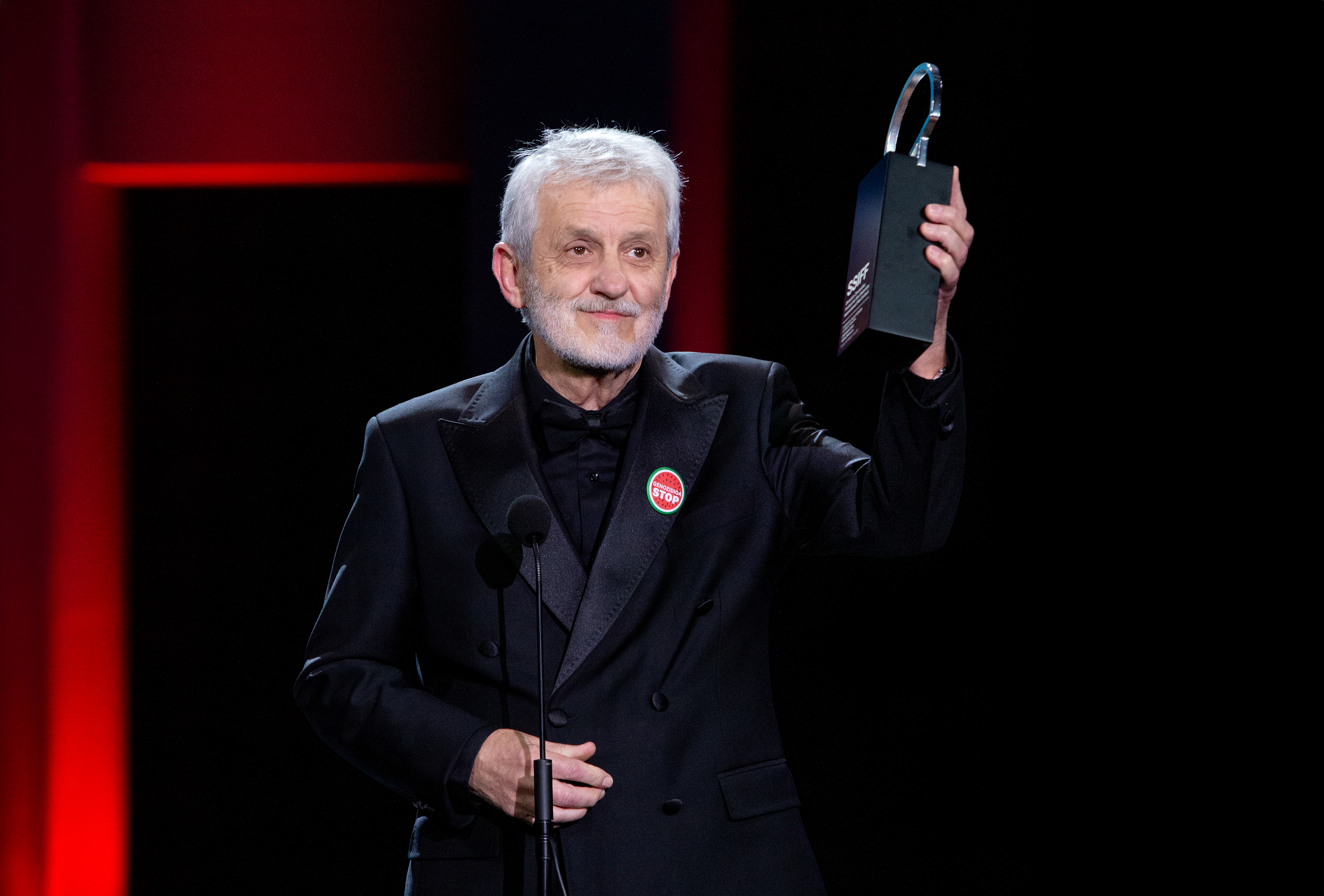
Jose Ramon Soroiz holding the Silver Shell for Best Leading Performance

Year	Actor	Film title	Ref.
2021 (69th)	Flora Ofelia	As in Heaven	
2021 (69th)	Jessica Chastain	The Eyes of Tammy Faye	
2022 (70th)	Carla Quílez	Motherhood	
2022 (70th)	Paul Kircher	Winter Boy	
2023 (71st)	Marcelo Subiotto	Puan	
2023 (71st)	Tatsuya Fuji	Great Absence	
2024 (72nd)	Patricia López Arnaiz	Glimmers	
2025 (73rd)	Zhao Xiaohong	Her Heart Beats in Its Cage	
2025 (73rd)	Jose Ramon Soroiz	Maspalomas	
2026 (74th)	Kate O'Flynn	Tender Loving Care	
2026 (74th)	Asta Kamma August	Growth of the Soil	

== See also ==
- Golden Shell for Best Film
- Silver Shell for Best Director
- Silver Shell for Best Supporting Performance
- Donostia Award
- Sebastiane Award
