= 71st San Sebastián International Film Festival =

2023 film festival

- Official poster of the 71st San Sebastián Film Festival featuring Javier Bardem
- Opening film: The Boy and the Heron
- Location: San Sebastián, Spain
- Awards: Golden Shell: The Rye Horn
- Festival date: 22–30 September 2023

San Sebastián International Film Festival
- 72nd 70th

The 71st San Sebastián International Film Festival ran 22–30 September 2023 in San Sebastián, Gipuzkoa, Spain. The awards were announced on 30 September 2023, with The Rye Horn winning the Golden Shell, being the first film directed by a female Spanish director to win said award.

== Background ==
In May 2023, actor Javier Bardem was announced as a recipient of a Donostia Award as well as the main feature of the 71st edition's official poster. An early subset of the official selection film slate was announced on 7 July 2023. New official selection titles were announced on 14 July 2023. In August 2023, The Boy and the Heron was announced as the out-of-competition opening film. Later that month, Spanish director Víctor Erice was announced to be the recipient of a Donostia Award. The entire official selection line-up was announced on 25 August. On 8 September, it was announced that Japanese director Hayao Miyazaki would receive a Donostia Award, presented to him virtually, while the award for Bardem would be postponed to next year's festival due to the 2023 SAG-AFTRA strike, which forbids the US-unionised actor to attend to the media or to record thank-you videos.

== Juries ==
=== Main Competition ===
- Claire Denis, French filmmaker – Jury president
- Fan Bingbing, Chinese actress
- Cristina Gallego, Colombian producer, writer and director
- Brigitte Lacombe, French photographer
- Robert Lantos, Hungarian-Canadian producer
- Vicky Luengo, Spanish actress
- Christian Petzold, German director

=== Kutxabank-New Directors Award ===
- Emily Morgan, British producer – Jury president
- Christian Jeune, French director of the Film Department and Deputy of the General Delegate of the Cannes Film Festival
- Ricardo Aldarondo, Spanish journalist and film critic
- Juanita Onzaga, Colombian director and artist
- Elisa Fernanda Pirir, Norwegian-Guatemalan producer

=== Latin Horizons ===
- David Hurst, French producer – Jury president
- Manuela Martelli, Chilean director, screenwriter and actress
- Elisa McCausland, Spanish journalist, critic and researcher

=== Zabaltegi-Tabakalera Award ===
- Fiorella Moretti, Mexican producer and president of Luxbox – Jury president
- Cecilia Barrionuevo, Argentine film curator

=== Irizar Award ===
- Telmo Irureta, Spanish actor – Jury president
- Mikele Landa, Spanish director
- Kristina Zorita, Spanish journalist, screenwriter and director

== Sections ==
=== Official selection ===
The lineup of the official selection includes:

==== In competition ====
Highlighted title indicates award winner.

English title	Original title	Director(s)	Production countrie(s)
All Dirt Roads Taste of Salt		Raven Jackson	United States
A Journey in Spring	春行	Tzu-Hui Peng, Ping-Wen Wang	Taiwan
Un amor		Isabel Coixet	Spain
Ex-Husbands		Noah Pritzker	United States
Fingernails		Christos Nikou	United States
Great Absence		Kei Chika-Ura	Japan
Kalak		Isabella Eklöf	Denmark
MMXX		Cristi Puiu	Romania; Moldova; France
Puan		María Alché, Benjamín Naishtat	Argentina; Italy; Germany; France; Brazil
The Practice	La práctica	Martín Rejtman	Argentina; Chile; Portugal
Red Island	L'île rouge	Robin Campillo	France; Belgium
The Royal Hotel		Kitty Green	Australia
The Rye Horn	O corno	Jaione Camborda	Spain; Portugal; Belgium
A Silence	Un silence	Joachim Lafosse	Belgium; France; Luxembourg
The Successor	Le Successeur	Xavier Legrand	France
Sultana's Dream	El sueño de la Sultana	Isabel Herguera	Spain; Germany

==== Out of Competition ====
English title	Original title	Director(s)	Production countrie(s)
The Boy and the Heron	君たちはどう生きるか	Hayao Miyazaki	Japan
La Mesías (TV series)		Javier Ambrossi, Javier Calvo	Spain
Dance First		James Marsh	United Kingdom; Hungary; Belgium
Special Screenings
They Shot the Piano Player	Dispararon al pianista	Fernando Trueba, Javier Mariscal	Spain; France; Netherlands; Portugal
A Real Job	Un métier sérieux	Thomas Lilti	France

=== New Directors ===
The New Directors slate includes:

Highlighted title indicates award winner.

English title	Original title	Director(s)	Production countrie(s)
Achilles	Ashil	Farhad Delaram	Germany; Iran; France
Bahadur The Brave		Diva Shah	India
Bauryna Salu		Askhat Kuchinhirekov	Kazakhstan
Beyond The Fog	Kiri No Fuchi	Daichi Murase	Japan
The Blue Star	La estrella azul	Javier Macipe	Spain; Argentina
Carefree Days	Xiao Yao You	Jiang Ming	China
Hi Mom		Ilia Malakhova	Russia
Last Shadow At First Light		Nicole Midori Woodford	Singapore; Japan; Slovenia; Philippines; Indonesia
The Other Son	El otro hijo	Juan Sebastián Quebrada	Colombia; France; Argentina
Gamma Rays	Les Rayons Gamma	Henry Bernadet	Canada
Mother, Couch		Niclas Larsson	United States; Denmark; Sweden

=== Latin Horizons (Horizontes Latinos) ===
The Latin Horizons slate includes the following films:

Highlighted title indicates award winner.

English title	Original title	Director(s)	Production countrie(s)
Alemania		María Zanetti	Argentina; Spain
Blondi		Dolores Fonzi	Argentina; Spain; United States
The Castle	El castillo	Martín Benchimol	Argentina; France; Spain
Clara Gets Lost in the Woods	Clara se pierde en el bosque	Camila Fabbri	Argentina
The Echo	El eco	Tatiana Huezo	Mexico; Germany
Heroic	Heroico	David Zonana	Mexico
Los impactados		Lucía Puenzo	Argentina
A Ravaging Wind (opening film)	El viento que arrasa	Paula Hernández	Argentina; Uruguay
The Settlers	Los colonos	Felipe Gálvez Haberle	Chile; Argentina; United Kingdom; Taiwan; France; Denmark; Sweden
A Strange Path	Estranho caminho	Guto Parente	Brazil
Toll (closing film)	Pedágio	Carolina Markowicz	Brazil; Portugal
Totem	Tótem	Lila Avilés	Mexico

=== Zabaltegi-Tabakalera ===
Highlighted title indicates award winner.

English title	Original title	Director(s)	Production countrie(s)
Absence	Xue Yun	Wu Lang	China
Camping du Lac		Éléonore Saintagnan	Belgium; France
Contadores		Irati Gorostidi	Spain
The Delinquents	Los delinquentes	Rodrigo Moreno	Argentina; Brazil; Chile; Luxembourg
Even Though It's Night	Aunque es de noche	Guillermo García López	Spain; France
Grace	Blazh	Ilya Povolotsky	Russia
Here		Bas Devos	Belgium
The Human Surge 3	El auge del humano 3	Eduardo Williams	Argentina; Portugal; Netherlands; Taiwan; Brazil; Hong Kong; Sri Lanka; Peru
The Island	L'île	Damien Manivel	France
Inside the Yellow Cocoon Shell	Bên trong vỏ kén vàng	Pham Thien An	Singapore; Vietnam; France; Spain
Mamántula		Ion de Sosa	Germany; Spain
Mixtape La Pampa		Andres Di Tella	Argentina; Chile
Nights Gone By		Alberto Martín Menacho	Switzerland; Spain
Orlando, My Political Biography	Orlando, ma biographie politique	Paul B. Preciado	France
Oyu		Atsushi Hirai	France
La Palisiada		Philip Sotnuchenko	Ukraine
Remembering Every Night (opening film)	Subete No Yoru Wo Omoidasu	Yui Kiyohara	Japan
Through the Night	Quitter la nuit	Delphine Girard	Belgium; France; Canada
The Trial	El juicio	Ulises de la Orden	Argentina; Norway; France; Italy
Two of Us	Suigyo no Mayawari	Kohei Igarashi	Japan; France
Sīlan		Ashmita Guha Neogi	France
Single Light	Or panas yachid	Shaylee Atary	Israel
Short Story	Duan pian gu shi	Wu Lang	China
We Are the Hollow Men	Gamopitulo khalkhi	Rati Oneli	Georgia

=== Perlak ===
The 'Perlak' lineup includes:

English title	Original title	Director(s)	Production countrie(s)
Afire	Roter Himmel	Christian Petzold	Germany
Anatomy of a Fall	Anatomie d'une chute	Justine Triet	France
Dumb Money		Craig Gillespie	United States
The Eternal Memory	La memoria infinita	Maite Alberdi	Chile
Evil Does Not Exist	悪は存在しない	Ryusuke Hamaguchi	Japan
Fallen Leaves	Kuolleet lehdet	Aki Kaurismäki	Finland; Germany
Les Indésirables	Bâtiment 5	Ladj Ly	France
I'm Captain	Io capitano	Matteo Garrone	Italy
May December		Todd Haynes	United States
Memory		Michel Franco	Mexico; United States
Monster	怪物	Hirokazu Kore-eda	Japan
The New Boy		Warwick Thornton	Australia
Past Lives		Celine Song	United States
Perfect Days		Wim Wenders	Japan; Germany
The Promised Land	Bastarden	Nikolaj Arcel	Denmark
Rosalie		Stéphanie Di Giusto	France
Society of the Snow	La sociedad de la nieve	J.A. Bayona	Spain; Uruguay; Chile
The Zone of Interest		Jonathan Glazer	United Kingdom

=== Surprise film ===
The following film was programmed as a surprise:

English title	Original title	Director(s)	Production countrie(s)
The Killer		David Fincher	United States

== Awards ==
=== Main Competition ===
- Golden Shell: The Rye Horn by Jaione Camborda
- Special Jury Prize: Kalak by Isabella Eklöf
- Silver Shell for Best Director: Tzu-Hui Peng & Ping-Wen Wang for A Journey in Spring
- Silver Shell for Best Leading Performance: Marcelo Subiotto for Puan & Tatsuya Fuji for Great Absence
- Silver Shell for Best Supporting Performance: Hovik Keuchkerian for Un amor
- Jury Prize for Best Screenplay: María Alché & Benjamín Naishtat for Puan
- Jury Prize Best Cinematography: Nadim Carlsen for Kalak

=== Other official awards ===
- Kutxabank-New Directors Award: Bahadur The Brave by Diva Shah
- Horizontes Award: The Castle by Martín Benchimol
- Zabaltegi-Tabakalera Award: The Human Surge 3 by Eduardo Williams
  - Special Mention: The Trial by Ulises de la Orden
- Nest Award: Amma Ki Katha by Nehal Vyas
  - Special Mention: Entre les autres by Marie Falys
- Culinary Zinema Award: The Pot-au-Feu by Trần Anh Hùng
- Eusko Label Award: Latxa by Mikel Urretabizkaia
  - Eusko Label Second Prize: Soroborda by Paolo Tizón
- Irizar Basque Film Award: Sultana's Dream by Isabel Herguera
- San Sebastian Audience Award: Society of the Snow by J. A. Bayona
- San Sebastian Audience Award for Best European Film: I'm Captain by Matteo Garrone
- TCM Youth Award: The Blue Star by Javier Macipe

=== Industry awards ===
- WIP LATAM Industry Award: Most People Die on Sundays by Iair Said
- EGEDA PLATINO Industria Award for the Best WIP LATAM: Most People Die on Sundays by Iair Said
- WIP Europa Industry Award: Mannequins by Michael Fetter Nathansky
- WIP Europa Award: Mannequins by Michael Fetter Nathansky
- XII Europe-Latin America Co-Production Forum Best Project Award: These Were All Fields by Daniela Abad Lombana
- DALE! Award: Little War by Barbara Sarasola-Day
- Artekino International Prize: The Days Off by Lucila Mariani
- ELAMEDIA - Euskadi Post-Production Award: After the Night, the Night by Naomi Pacifique

=== Other awards ===
- RTVE-Another Look Award: The Royal Green by Kitty Green
  - Special Mention: All Dirt Roads Taste of Salt by Raven Jackson
- Spanish Cooperation Award: The Blue Star by Javier Macipe
- Euskadi Basque Country 2030 Agenda Award: Les Indésirables by Ladj Ly
- Dunia Ayaso Award: Creatura by Elena Martín Gimeno
  - Special Mention: While You're Still You by Claudia Pinto Emperador

=== Parallel awards ===
- FIPRESCI Award: Fingernails by Christos Nikou
- Feroz Zinemaldia Award: Un amor by Isabel Coixet
- Euskal Gidoigileen Elkartea Award: Sultana's Dream by Isabel Herguera
- Sebastiane Award: 20,000 Species of Bees by Estibaliz Urresola
  - Special Mention: Gabi: Between Ages 8 and 13 by Engeli Broberg
- Lurra - Greenpeace Award: Evil Does Not Exist by Ryusuke Hamaguchi
- SIGNIS Award: All Dirt Roads Taste of Salt by Raven Jackson
- Ateneo Guipuzcoano Award: Great Absence by Kei Chika-Ura

=== Donostia awards ===
- Donostia Award for Lifetime Achievements: Javier Bardem, Victor Erice and Hayao Miyazaki.
- Zinemira Award: Paco Sagarzazu
