= Carla Quílez =

Spanish actress (born 2008)

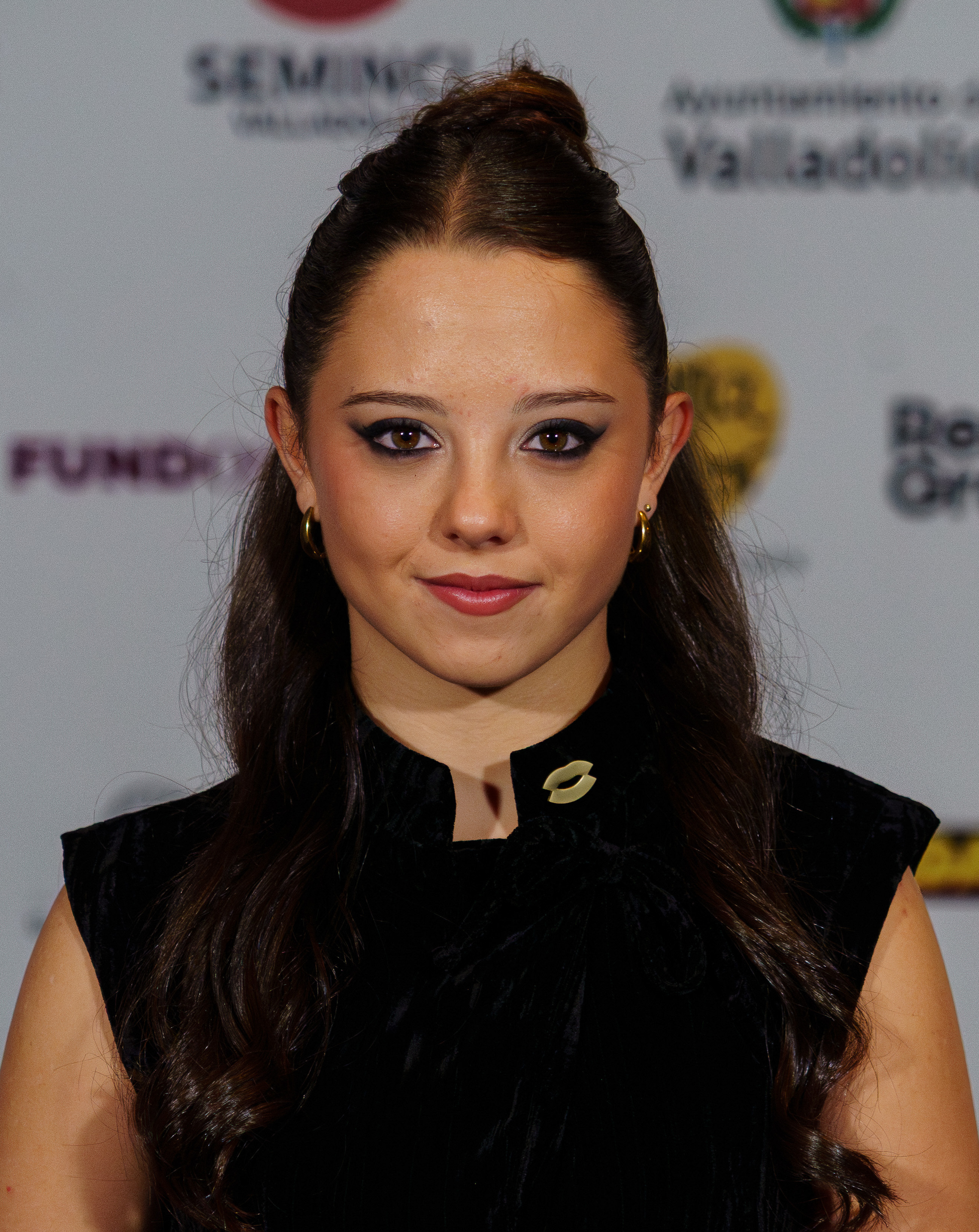
- Quílez in 2025
- Born: Carla Quílez Alonso; February 2008 (age 18); Barcelona, Catalonia, Spain
- Occupations: Actress; dancer
- Years active: 2022–present

Carla Quílez Alonso (Catalan: [ˈkaɾlə ˈkiləs]; born February 2008) is a Spanish actress and dancer. She is known for her starring role in the teen drama film Motherhood (2022), for which she won the Gaudí Award for Best New Performance.

== Early life ==
Carla Quílez Alonso was born in Barcelona, Spain, in February 2008, to Eva, a logistics administrator. She is a native of Horta, Barcelona.

Quílez has been dedicated to dance since the age of 6, covering various genres, starting with ballet, contemporary, ballet with tap, urban dance, and hip hop.

== Career ==
Quílez made her feature film debut in Pilar Palomero's teen drama Motherhood, portraying Carla, a pregnant teenager who arrives at a shelter for teenage mothers, where she receives support and forms bonds with other girls in the same situation. She got an audition for the film after Irene Roqué, the casting director, discovered one of her choreography videos on Instagram.

Her performance earned her the Silver Shell for Best Leading Performance ex aequo alongside Paul Kircher at the 70th San Sebastián International Film Festival, the Gaudí Award for Best New Performance, the CEC Medal for Best New Actress, and received a Feroz Award nomination for Best Actress in a Film.

== Filmography ==
Key
†	Denotes films that have not yet been released

=== Film ===
Year	Title	Role	Notes	Ref.
2022	Motherhood	Carla		
2024	La niña tatuada	Irene	Short film	
TBA	Selectivitat †	Clara		

=== Television ===
Year	Title	Role	Notes	Ref.
2024	The Last Night at Tremore Beach	Bea		
2025	Yakarta	Mar		
2025	Dime tu nombre		Miniseries	

== Awards and nominations ==
Award	Date of ceremony	Category	Title	Result	Ref.
CEC Medals	9 February 2022	Best New Actress	Motherhood	Nominated	
Feroz Awards	28 January 2023	Best Actress in a Film	Motherhood	Nominated	
Gaudí Awards	22 January 2023	Best New Performance	Motherhood	Won	
San Sebastián International Film Festival	24 September 2022	Silver Shell for Best Leading Performance	Motherhood	Won	
Feroz Awards	24 January 2026	Best Main Actress in a Series	Jakarta	Nominated	
Actors and Actresses Union Awards	16 March 2026	Best Television Actress in a Leading Role	Jakarta	Nominated	
Platino Awards	9 May 2026	Best Actress in a Miniseries or TV Series	Jakarta	Nominated	
