= 69th San Sebastián International Film Festival =

2021 film festival

- Official poster of the 69th San Sebastián Film Festival featuring Sigourney Weaver
- Opening film: One Second
- Location: San Sebastián, Spain
- Awards: Golden Shell (Blue Moon)
- Directors: José Luis Rebordinos
- Festival date: 17–25 September 2021

San Sebastián International Film Festival
- 70th 68th

The 69th San Sebastián International Film Festival took place from 17 to 25 September 2021 in San Sebastián, Gipuzkoa, Spain. The festival opened with Zhang Yimou's One Second. Marion Cotillard and Johnny Depp were awarded the Donostia Award for lifetime achievements. The Donostia Award bestowed to Johnny Depp was mired by controversy and public scrutiny.

The competitive awards were presented on 25 September 2021. Blue Moon by Alina Grigore won the Golden Shell award, whereas Jessica Chastain (The Eyes of Tammy Faye) shared the Silver Shell for Best Leading Performance (a new non-gendered category replacing the former gendered acting awards) with Danish teen Flora Ofelia Hofmann Lindahl (As in Heaven). The official poster featuring actress Sigourney Weaver was designed by Eva Villar based on a picture by Matthew Brookes.

== Juries ==
Official Selection

- Dea Kulumbegashvili
- Susi Sánchez
- Maite Alberdi
- Audrey Diwan
- Ted Hope

Horizontes latinos

- María Zamora
- Lila Avilés
- Luciano Monteagudo

New Directors

- Mary Burke
- Irene Escolar
- Suzanne Lindon

Zabaltegi-Tabakalera

- Sergio Oksman
- Miriam Heard
- Elena López Riera

== Sections ==
=== Official Selection ===
In competition

The lineup of films selected for the Official Selection is as follows:

Highlighted title indicates award winner.

English title	Original title	Director(s)	Production country
One Second	一秒钟	Zhang Yimou	China
Arthur Rambo		Laurent Cantet	France
Benediction		Terence Davies	United Kingdom
Camila Comes Out Tonight	Camila saldrá esta noche	Inés Barrionuevo	Argentina
Blue Moon	Crai Nou	Alina Grigore	Romania
Fever Dream	Distancia de rescate	Claudia Llosa	Peru; United States; Chile; Spain
As in Heaven	Du som er i himlen	Tea Lindeburg	Denmark
Earwig		Lucile Hadzihalilovic	United Kingdom · France · Belgium
The Good Boss	El buen patrón	Fernando León de Aranoa	Spain
Enquête sur un scandale d'État (2021 film)	Enquête sur un scandale d'État	Thierry de Peretti	France
The Grandmother	La abuela	Paco Plaza	Spain; France
Maixabel		Icíar Bollaín	Spain
Fire on the Plain	平原上的火焰	Zhang Ji	China
Who's Stopping Us	Quién lo impide	Jonás Trueba	Spain
The Eyes of Tammy Faye		Michael Showalter	United States
I Want to Talk About Duras	Vous ne désirez que moi	Claire Simon	France

Out of competition

The following works (including a short and a miniseries) were selected to screen out of competition:

English title	Original title	Director(s)	Production countrie(s)
Rosa Rosae. A Spanish Civil War Elegy	Rosa Rosae. La guerra civil	Carlos Saura	Spain
Las leyes de la frontera		Daniel Monzón	Spain
La Fortuna		Alejandro Amenábar	Spain
The Daughter	La hija	Manuel Martín Cuenca	Spain

=== Horizontes Latinos ===
The following films were selected for the Horizontes Latinos section:

Highlighted title indicates award winner.

English title	Original title	Director(s)	Production countrie(s)
Dusk Stone	Piedra Noche	Iván Fund	Argentina · Chile · Spain
The Employer and the Employee	El empleado y el patrón	Manolo Nieto	Uruguay; Argentina; Brazil; France
Jesús López		Maximiliano Schonfeld	Argentina; France
Madalena		Madiano Marcheti	Brazil
Aurora		Paz Fábrega	Costa Rica; Mexico; Panama
The Box	La caja	Lorenzo Vigas	Mexico; United States
A Cop Movie	Una película de policías	Alonso Ruizpalacios	Mexico
Azor		Andreas Fontana	Switzerland; Argentina; France
Prayers for the Stolen	Noche de fuego	Tatiana Huezo	Mexico; Germany; Brazil; Qatar
Amparo		Simón Mesa Soto	Colombia; Sweden; Germany; Qatar

=== New Directors ===
The following films were selected for the New Directors section:

Highlighted title indicates award winner.

English title	Original title	Director(s)	Production countrie(s)
Carajita		Silvina Schnicer, Ulises Porra	Dominican Republic; Argentina
That Weekend	Ese fin de semana	Mara Pescio	Argentina; Brazil
Aloners	Honja Saneun Salamdeul · 혼자 사는 사람들	Hong Sung-eun	South Korea
Between Two Dawns	İki Şafak Arasinda	Selman Nacar	Turkey; France; Romania; Spain
Inventory	Inventura	Darko Sinko	Slovenia
Josephine	Josefina	Javier Marco	Spain
The Rust	La Roya	Juan Sebastián Mesa	Colombia; France
Hilda's Short Summer	Las vacaciones de Hilda	Agustin Banchero	Uruguay; Brazil
The Noise of Engines	Le bruit des moteurs	Philippe Grégoire	Canada
Mikado	Marocco	Emanuel Parvu	Romania; Czech Republic
Mass		Fran Kranz	United States
Unwanted	Nich'ya	Lena Lanskih	Russia
Lost in Summer	Shu qi shi guang	Sun Liang	China

=== Zabaltegi-Tabakalera ===
The following films were selected for the Zabaltegi-Tabakalera section:

Highlighted title indicates award winner.

English title	Original title	Director(s)	Production countrie(s)
Mi iubita, mon amour		Noémie Merlant	France
Unclenching the Fists	Razzhimaya kulaki · Разжимая кулаки	Kira Kovalenko	Russia
Petrov's Flu	Petrovy v grippe · вы в гриппе	Kirill Serebrennikov	Russia; France; Switzerland; Germany
Playground	Un monde	Laura Wandel	Belgium
Vortex		Gaspar Noé	France
Bad Luck Banging or Loony Porn	Babardeală cu bucluc sau porno balamuc	Radu Jude	Romania; Luxembourg; Czech Republic; Croatia
The Crossing	La Traversée	Florence Miailhe	France; Germany; Czech Republic
They Carry Death	Eles transportan a morte	Helena Girón, Samuel M. Delgado	Spain; Colombia
The Great Movement	El gran movimiento	Kiro Russo	Bolivia; France
107 Mothers	Cenzorka	Péter Kerekes	Slovakia; Czech Republic; Ukraine
Haruhara-san's Recorder	Haruharasan no uta	Kyoshi Sugita	Japan

=== Perlak ===
The following films were selected for the Perlak section:

==== In competition ====
English title	Original title	Director(s)	Production country
Official Competition	Competencia oficial	Gastón Duprat, Mariano Cohn	Spain, Argentina
Benedetta	Benedetta	Paul Verhoeven	France, Netherlands
Wheel of Fortune and Fantasy	Gūzen to sōzō	Ryusuke Hamaguchi	Japan
Jane by Charlotte	Jane par Charlotte	Charlotte Gainsbourg	France
The Crusade	La croisade	Louis Garrel	France
Lost Illusions	Illusions perdues	Xavier Giannoli	France
The Restless	Les Intranquilles	Joachim Lafosse	Belgium, France
Between Two Worlds	Ouistreham	Emmanuel Carrère	France
Petite Maman	Petite Maman	Céline Sciamma	France
Are You Lonesome Tonight?	Re dai wang shi	Wen Shipei	China
Red Rocket	Red Rocket	Sean Baker	United States
The French Dispatch	The French Dispatch	Wes Anderson	United States
The Power of the Dog	The Power of the Dog	Jane Campion	New Zealand, Australia
Everything Went Fine	Tout s'est bien passé	François Ozon	France

==== Out of competition ====
English title	Original title	Director	Production country
The Velvet Underground	The Velvet Underground	Todd Haynes	United States
Drive My Car	Doraibu mai kā	Ryusuke Hamaguchi	Japan
Titane	Titane	Julia Ducournau	France

=== Nest ===
The following short films were selected for the Nest section, the international competition for film school students, which celebrated its 20th anniversary in 2021:

Title	Director	Production country	Film school
À la recherche d'Aline	Rokhaya Marieme Balde	Switzerland	HEAD – Genève
after a room	Naomi Pacifique	United Kingdom / Netherlands / Switzerland	London Film School
Algo así como la noche	Alván Prado	Spain	EFTI
Crashing Waves	Lucy Kerr	United States	California Institute of the Arts (CalArts)
Fantasma neon / Neon Phantom	Leonardo Martinelli	Brazil	Pontifícia Universidade Católica do Rio de Janeiro (PUC-Rio)
Hullet / The Hole	Christoffer Ansel	Denmark	The National Film School of Denmark
Ob scena	Paloma Orlandini Castro	Argentina	Universidad Nacional de San Martín
Ospalky / Rheum	Kateřina Hroníková	Slovakia	Academy of Music and Performing Arts (FTF VSMU)
Planuri de vacanta / Summer Planning	Alexandru Mironescu	Romania	UNATC I.L. Caragiale
Podul de piatrâ / Pont de pedra	Artur-Pol Camprubí	Spain	Elías Querejeta Zine Eskola (EQZE)
Rondinella / Little Swallow	Nikita Merlini	Switzerland	ECAL / École cantonale d'art de Lausanne
U šumi / In the Woods	Sara Grgurić	Croatia	Academy of Dramatic Arts, Zagreb
Ye xing ren min gong yuan / A Nocturnal Roam	Feng Yi	China	China Film Art Research Center
Yearlings	Mélanie Akoka	France	NYU Tisch Grad Film

=== Donostia Award Screenings ===
The following film was selected for the Donostia Award Screenings section:

English title	Original title	Director(s)	Production countrie(s)
Bigger Than Us	Bigger Than Us	Flore Vasseur	France

=== Surprise film ===
The following film was programmed as a surprise:

English title	Original title	Director(s)	Production countrie(s)
Spencer		Pablo Larraín	United Kingdom; United States; Germany; Chile

== Official Selection Awards ==
- Golden Shell: Blue Moon by Alina Grigore
- Special Jury Prize: Earwig by Lucile Hadžihalilović
- Silver Shell for Best Director: Tea Lindeburg (As in Heaven)
- Silver Shell for Best Leading Performance: Flora Ofelia (As in Heaven) & Jessica Chastain (The Eyes of Tammy Faye)
- Silver Shell for Best Supporting Performance: cast of Who's Stopping Us
- Best Screenplay: Terence Davies (Benediction)
- Best Cinematography: Claire Mathon (Undercover)

== Special awards ==
Donostia Award for lifetime achievements: Marion Cotillard and Johnny Depp

- Nest Award: U šumi / In the Woods – Sara Grgurić
  - Special Mention: Podul de piatrâ / Pont de pedra – Artur-Pol Camprubí
