= Motherhood (2022 Spanish film) =

- Theatrical release poster
- Spanish: La Maternal
- Directed by: Pilar Palomero
- Screenplay by: Pilar Palomero
- Produced by: Valérie Delpierre; Alex Lafuente
- Starring: Carla Quílez; Ángela Cervantes
- Cinematography: Julián Elizalde
- Edited by: Sofie Escudé
- Production companies: Inicia Films; Bteam Prods
- Distributed by: BTeam Pictures
- Release dates: 20 September 2022 (Zinemaldia); 18 November 2022 (Spain)
- Country: Spain
- Language: Spanish

Motherhood (Spanish: La Maternal) is a 2022 teen drama film written and directed by Pilar Palomero starring Carla Quílez and Ángela Cervantes.

== Plot ==
The plot tracks Carla, a 14-year old pregnant girl placed in a centre for teenage mothers where she hangs out with other teen classmates (Raki, Estel, Claudia, Jamila and Sheila). She also has to deal with the vicissitudes of her fraught relation with her mother Penélope.

== Cast ==
- Carla Quílez as Carla
- Ángela Cervantes as Penélope
- Jordan Dumes
- Pepe Lorente
- Olga Hueso
- Rubén Martínez
- Gal·la Sabaté
- Neus Pàmies

== Production ==
The screenplay was written by Pilar Palomero. La maternal (Palomero's sophomore feature after Schoolgirls) is an Inicia Films and Bteam Prods production, with the participation of RTVE, TVC, Televisión de Aragón, and Movistar+ and support from Creative Europe's MEDIA, ICAA and ICEC. Julián Elizalde worked as cinematographer.

Shooting took place in late 2021 and lasted for 8 weeks. Shooting locations included Los Monegros and Barcelona and its surroundings.

== Release ==
The film made its world premiere at the 70th San Sebastián International Film Festival's official selection on 20 September 2022. It will have its international premiere at the Zurich Film Festival. Distributed by BTeam Pictures, it is set for an 18 November 2022 theatrical release in Spain. Elle Driver acquired rights for worldwide sales outside Spain and France.

== Reception ==
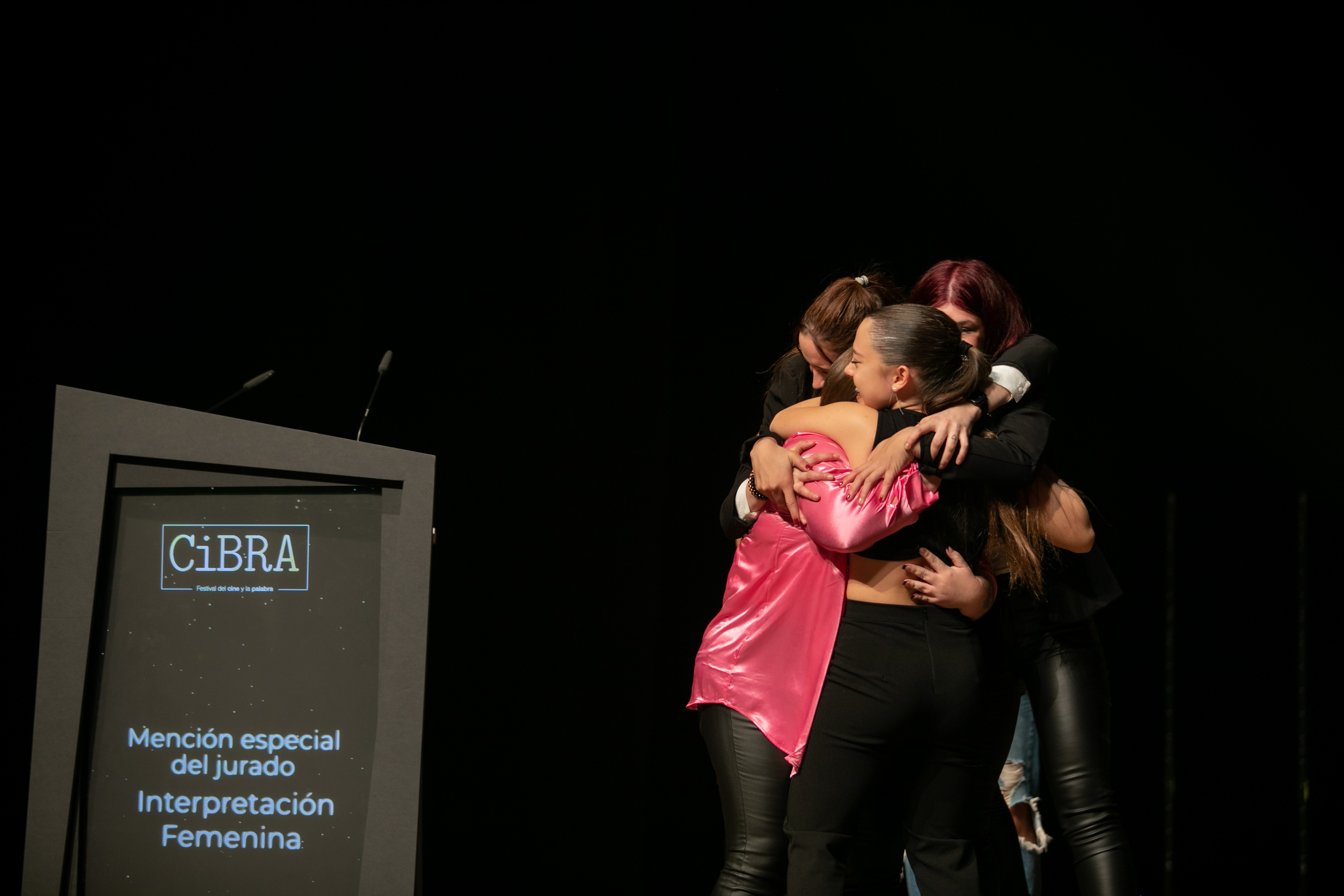
Cast members attending the closing gala of the 2022 Festival CiBRA, where actress Carla Quílez earned a Special Mention from the Jury for her Female Performance.

According to the review aggregation website Rotten Tomatoes, the film has an 92% approval rating based on 13 reviews from critics, with an average rating of 7.9/10.

Jonathan Holland of ScreenDaily deemed the film to be "superbly directed by Palomero, who seems to have a special gift for seeing the world through children's eyes".

Raquel Hernández Luján of HobbyConsolas rated the film with 65 points ("acceptable") deeming it to be more interesting by its subject than by its forms, praising "the reality that [the film] makes visible" but pointing out that "the style is too crude, it is an unbearable film at times".

Juan Pando of Fotogramas rated the film 5 out of 5 stars, deeming it to be "one of the best films, if not the best, [in 2022 Spanish cinema]", praising "that true prodigy named Carla Quílez" as the best thing about the film while citing the film's excess length as a negative point.

Sergi Sánchez of La Razón rated the film 3 out of 5 stars, positively highlighting Quílez's naturalness while pointing out that "a certain capacity for synthesis is lacking" in the film.

=== Top ten lists ===
The film appeared on a number of critics' top ten lists of the best Spanish films of 2022:

- 2nd — El Confidencial (Marta Medina)
- 2nd — El Cultural (Begoña Donat)
- 3rd — El Español ('Series&más' critics)
- 3rd — Cadena SER (Jose M. Romero)
- 4th — Cadena SER ('El cine en la SER' critics)
- 4th — ABC (Oti Rodríguez Marchante)
- 6th — Vanity Fair (Juan Sanguino & Paloma Rando)
- 7th — Cadena SER (Pepa Blanes)
- 8th — El Cultural (Carlos Heredero)
- 7th — Cadena SER (Elio Castro)
- 9th — El Cultural (Juan Sardá)
- 10th — El Cultural (Carlos Reviriego)
- 10th — El Periódico de Catalunya (critics)

== Accolades ==
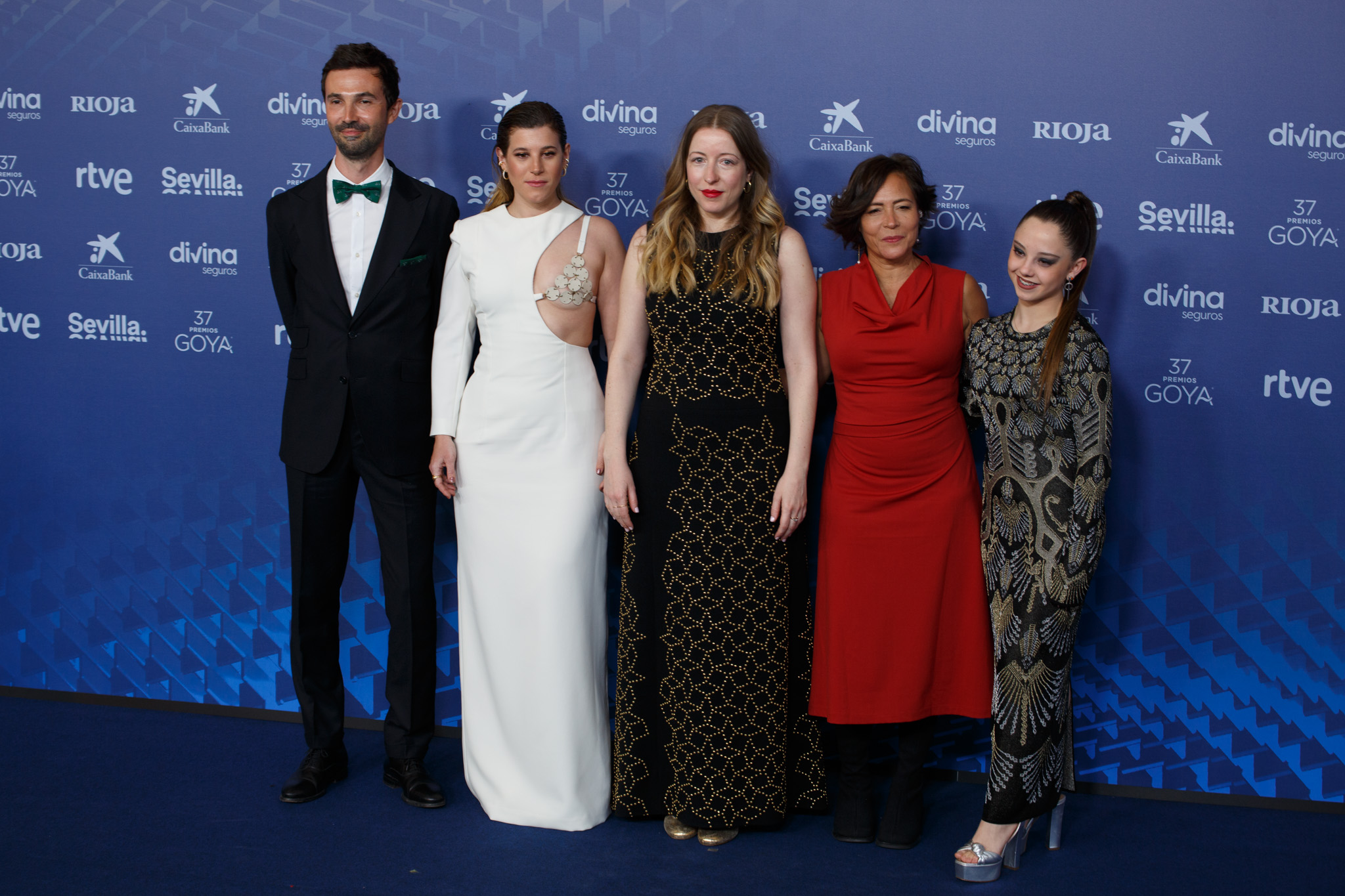
Alex Lafuente, Ángela Cervantes, Pilar Palomero, Valérie Delpierre and Carla Quílez attending the 37th Goya Awards.

Year	Award	Category	Nominee(s)	Result	Ref.
2022	70th San Sebastián International Film Festival	Silver Shell for Best Leading Performance	Carla Quílez	Won	
2023	15th Gaudí Awards	Best Non-Catalan Language Film		Nominated	
2023	15th Gaudí Awards	Best Director	Pilar Palomero	Nominated	
2023	15th Gaudí Awards	Best Original Screenplay	Pilar Palomero	Nominated	
2023	15th Gaudí Awards	Best Supporting Actress	Ángela Cervantes	Won	
2023	15th Gaudí Awards	Best New Performance	Carla Quílez	Won	
2023	10th Feroz Awards	Best Director	Pilar Palomero	Nominated	
2023	10th Feroz Awards	Best Actress in a Film	Carla Quílez	Nominated	
2023	10th Feroz Awards	Best Supporting Actress in a Film	Ángela Cervantes	Nominated	
2023	2nd Carmen Awards	Best Non-Andalusian Film		Nominated	
2023	78th CEC Medals	Best Director	Pilar Palomero	Nominated	
2023	78th CEC Medals	Best New Actress	Carla Quílez	Nominated	
2023	37th Goya Awards	Best Film		Nominated	
2023	37th Goya Awards	Best Director	Pilar Palomero	Nominated	
2023	37th Goya Awards	Best Supporting Actress	Ángela Cervantes	Nominated	
2023	31st Actors and Actresses Union Awards	Best Film Actress in a Secondary Role	Ángela Cervantes	Nominated	

== See also ==
- List of Spanish films of 2022
