= 70th San Sebastián International Film Festival =

2022 film festival

- Official poster of the 70th San Sebastián Film Festival featuring Juliette Binoche
- Opening film: Prison 77
- Location: San Sebastián, Spain
- Awards: Golden Shell: The Kings of the World
- Directors: José Luis Rebordinos
- Festival date: 16–24 September 2022

San Sebastián International Film Festival
- 71st 69th

The 70th San Sebastián International Film Festival took place from 16 to 24 September 2022 in San Sebastián, Gipuzkoa, Spain. The awards were announced on 24 September 2022, with The Kings of the World winning the Golden Shell.

== Background ==
Partnering with the Málaga Film Festival, the 70th edition will feature 'Spanish Screenings XXL', a beefed up joint version of the 'Spanish Screenings' film market, hitherto showcased at Málaga. In May 2022, French actress Juliette Binoche was revealed to be the protagonist of the film's official poster as well as the recipient of a Donostia honorary career award. In June 2022, Canadian filmmaker David Cronenberg was disclosed as the recipient of another Donostia Award.

The official selection's film Prison 77 will open the festival, screened out of competition. Other than the opener, an initial lineup with some titles from Spain was announced on 15 July 2022. A slate of 12 international main competition works was announced on 2 August.

== Juries ==
=== Main Competition ===
- Matías Mosteirín, Argentinian producer - Jury President
- Antoinette Boulat, French casting director and filmmaker
- Tea Lindeburg, Danish filmmaker
- Rosa Montero, Spanish writer
- Lemohang Jeremiah Mosese, Lesotho filmmaker
- Hlynur Pálmason, Icelandic director

American actress Glenn Close was slated to feature as Jury president, but cancelled her visit in the wake of a "family emergency".

=== Kutxabank-New Directors Award ===
- Alina Grigore, filmmaker, Romania - Jury President
- Paolo Moretti, programmer, Italy
- Paula Arantzazu Ruiz, film critic, Spain
- Selva Almada, writer, Argentina
- Ashmita Guha, filmmaker, India

=== Horizonte Latinos ===
- Giovanni Pompili, Italian producer - Jury President
- Tatiana Huezo, Salvadoran filmmaker
- Júlia Olmo, Spanish film critic

=== Zabaltegi-Tabakalera Award ===
- Albertina Carri, Argentine director, screenwriter and producer - Jury President
- Vanja Kaluđerčić, director of Rotterdam Film Festival
- Manuel Calvo, producer and director

=== Irizar Award ===
- Ander Izagirre, journalist and writer - Jury President
- Nerea Kortabitarte, communicator and writer
- Txema Muñoz, programmer

== Sections ==
=== Official selection ===
The lineup of titles selected for the official selection include:

Highlighted title indicates award winner.

English Title	Original Title	Director(s)	Production Countrie(s)
Il Boemo		Petr Václav	Czech Republic; Italy; Slovakia
Cork	Suro	Mikel Gurrea	Spain
Forever	Resten af livet	Frelle Petersen	Denmark
Great Yarmouth-Provisional Figures		Marco Martins	Portugal; France; United Kingdom
A Hundred Flowers	百花	Genki Kawamura	Japan
The Kings of the World	Los reyes del mundo	Laura Mora	Colombia; Luxembourg; France; Mexico; Norway
La maternal		Pilar Palomero	Spain
Pornomelancholia	Pornomelancolía	Manuel Abramovich	Argentina; France; Brazil; Mexico
The Rite of Spring	La consagración de la primavera	Fernando Franco	Spain
Runner		Marian Mathias	United States; Germany; France
Sparta		Ulrich Seidl	Austria; France; Germany
The Substitute	El suplente	Diego Lerman	Argentina; Spain; Italy; Mexico; France
Walk Up	탑	Hong Sangsoo	South Korea
Wild Flowers	Girasoles silvestres	Jaime Rosales	Spain; France
Winter Boy	Le Lycéen	Christophe Honoré	France
A Woman	孔秀	Wang Chao	China
The Wonder		Sebastián Lelio	United Kingdom; Ireland

==== Out of Competition ====
English title	Original title	Director(s)	Production countrie(s)
Marlowe		Neil Jordan	Spain; Ireland; France
Offworld	Apagón	Rodrigo Sorogoyen, Raúl Arévalo, Isa Campo, Alberto Rodríguez, Isaki Lacuesta	Spain
Prison 77	Modelo 77	Alberto Rodríguez	Spain
Special Screenings
El sostre groc		Isabel Coixet	Spain
Tax Me If You Can	La (Très) Grande Évasion	Yannick Kergoat	France

=== Latin Horizons (Horizontes Latinos) ===
The line up of films selected for the Latin Horizons section is as follows:

Highlighted title indicates award winner.

English title	Original title	Director(s)	Production countrie(s)
My Imaginary Country	Mi país imaginario	Patricio Guzmán	France; Chile
Octopus Skin	La piel pulpo	Ana Cristina Barragán	Ecuador; Greece; Mexico; Germany; France
1976		Manuela Martelli	Chile
Charcoal	Carvão	Carolina Markowicz	Brazil; Argentina
Dos estaciones		Juan Pablo González	Mexico; France; United States
The Padilla affair	El caso Padilla	Pavel Giroud	Spain; Cuba
The Pack	La Jauría	Andrés Ramírez Pulido	France; Colombia
Noise	Ruido	Natalia Beristáin	Mexico
Sublime		Mariano Biasin	Argentina
I Have Electric Dreams	Tengo sueños eléctricos	Valentina Maurel	Belgium; France; Costa Rica
A Male	Un varón	Fabián Hernández	Colombia; France; Netherlands; Germany
Vicenta B.		Carlos Lechuga	Cuba; France; United States; Colombia

=== New Directors ===
The initial lineup of films selected for the Kutxabank-New Directors section is as follows:

Highlighted title indicates award winner.

English title	Original title	Director(s)	Production countrie(s)
To Books and Women I Sing	A los libros y a las mujeres canto	María Elorza	Spain
Carbon		Ion Bors	Moldova; Romania; Spain
The Great Silence	Den Store Stilhed	Katrine Brocks	Denmark
Spare Keys	Fifi	Jeanne Aslan, Paul Saintillan	France
Thunder	Foudre	Carmen Jaquier	Switzerland
Carbide	Garbura	Josip Žuvan	Croatia
Grand Marin		Dinara Drukarova	France
Jeong-sun		Ji-hye Jeong	South Korea
Daughter of Rage	La hija de todas las rabias	Laura Baumeister	Nicaragua; Mexico; Netherlands; Germany; France; Spain
Roleless	Miyamatsu To Yamashita	Masahiko Sato, Yutaro Seki, Kentaro Hirase	Japan
Nagisa		Takeshi Kogahara	Japan
On Either Sides of the Pond	Pokhar Ke Dunu Para	Parth Saurabh	India
Tobacco Barns	Secaderos	Rocío Mesa	Spain; United States
A Tale of Shemroon	Chevalier noir	Emad Aleebrahim Dehkordi	France; Germany; Italy; Iran
Something You Said Last Night		Luis De Filippis	Canada; Switzerland

=== Perlak ===
A list of films selected for the 'Perlak' lineup is as follows:

English title	Original title	Director(s)	Production countrie(s)
Argentina, 1985		Santiago Mitre	Argentina; United States
Bardo, False Chronicle of a Handful of Truths	Bardo, falsa crónica de unas cuantas verdades	Alejandro G. Iñarritu	Mexico
The Beasts	As bestas	Rodrigo Sorogoyen	Spain; France
Broker	브로커	Hirokazu Kore-eda	South Korea
Corsage		Marie Kreutzer	Austria; France; Germany; Luxembourg
Don't Worry Darling		Olivia Wilde	United States
God's Crooked Lines	Los renglones torcidos de Dios	Oriol Paulo	Spain
The Innocent	L'innocent	Louis Garrel	France
Living		Oliver Hermanus	United Kingdom
Moonage Daydream		Brett Morgen	United States
On the Fringe	En los márgenes	Juan Diego Botto	Spain; Belgium
One Fine Morning	Un beau matin	Mia Hansen-Løve	France
One Year, One Night	Un año, una noche	Isaki Lacuesta	Spain; France
Peter von Kant		François Ozon	France
R.M.N.		Cristian Mungiu	Romania; France; Belgium
Tori and Lokita	Tori et Lokita	Jean-Pierre and Luc Dardenne	Belgium; France
Triangle of Sadness		Ruben Östlund	Sweden

=== Zabaltegi-Tabakalera ===
The lineup of films in the Zabaltegi-Tabakalera section is as follows:

Highlighted title indicates award winner.

English title	Original title	Director(s)	Production countrie(s)
The Mountain	La montagne	Thomas Salvador	France
Les créatures qui fondent au soleil		Diego Céspedes	Chile; France
Trenque Lauquen		Laura Citarella	Argentina; Germany
A Human Position		Anders Emblem	Norway
Friends on a Country Road	Amigas en un camino de campo	Santiago Loza	Argentina
Blank Narcissus (Passion of the Swamp)		Peter Strickland	United Kingdom; Australia
Piggy	Cerdita	Carlota Pereda	Spain; France
Chords	Cuerdas	Estibaliz Urresola	Spain
Diarios		Andrés Di Tella	Argentina
The Water	El agua	Elena López Riera	Switzerland; France; Spain
Godland		Hlynur Pálmason	Denmark; Iceland; France; Sweden
Heartbeat		Lee Chang-dong	South Korea
Third Notebook	Hirugarren koadernoa	Lur Olaizola	Spain
Robe of Gems	Manto de gemas	Natalia López Gallardo	Mexico; Argentina
Meet Me in the Bathroom		Dylan Southern	United Kingdom
Mutzenbacher		Ruth Beckermann	Austria
Itchan and Satchan	Naname no rouka	Takayuki Fukata	Japan
Nest		Hlynur Pálmason	Denmark; Iceland
Nowhere to Go But Everywhere		Erick Shirai, Masako Tsumura	Japan
Piaffe		Ann Oren	Germany
A Short Story	Po Sui Tai Yang Zhi Xin	Bi Gan	China
Unrest	Unrueh	Cyril Schäublin	Switzerland
Letter to My Mother for My Son	Carta a mi madre para mi hijo	Carla Simón	Spain

=== Velodromo ===
English title	Original title	Director(s)	Production countrie(s)
Black Is Beltza II: Ainhoa		Fermin Muguruza	Spain
Rainbow		Paco León	Spain
Feeling It	Sintiéndolo mucho	Fernando León de Aranoa	Spain; Mexico

=== Made in Spain ===
The slate of films selected for screening in the 'Made in Spain' section is as follows:

English title	Original title	Director(s)	Production countrie(s)
Color of Heaven	El color del cielo	Joan Marc Zapata	Spain; Switzerland
The House Among the Cactuses	La casa entre los cactus	Carlota González-Adrio	Spain
Alcarràs		Carla Simón	Spain; Italy
Love Gets a Room	El amor en su lugar	Rodrigo Cortés	Spain
The Critic	El crítico	Juan Zavala, Javier Morales Pérez	Spain
Alone in the Mountains	Entre montañas	Unai Canela	Spain
Girlfriends and Girlfriends	La amiga de mi amiga	Zaida Carmona	Spain
Unfinished Affairs	La maniobra de la tortuga	Juan Miguel del Castillo	Spain; Argentina
Full of Grace	Llenos de gracia	Roberto Bueso	Spain
My Emptiness and I	Mi vacío y yo	Adrián Silvestre	Spain
You Have to Come and See It	Tenéis que venir a verla	Jonás Trueba	Spain
Tequila. Sex, Drog and Rock and Roll	Tequila. Sexo, drogas y rock and roll	Álvaro Longoria	Spain
Pacifiction	Tourment sur les îles	Albert Serra	France; Spain; Germany; Portugal

=== Surprise film ===
The following film was programmed as a surprise:

English title	Original title	Director(s)	Production countrie(s)
Blonde		Andrew Dominik	United States

== Awards ==
=== Main Competition ===
- Golden Shell: The Kings of the World by Laura Mora
- Special Jury Prize: Runner by Marian Mathias
- Silver Shell for Best Director: Genki Kawamura for A Hundred Flowers
- Silver Shell for Best Leading Performance: Paul Kircher for Winter Boy & Carla Quílez for Motherhood
- Silver Shell for Best Supporting Performance: Renata Lerman for The Substitute
- Best Screenplay: Wang Chao & Dong Yun Zhou for A Woman
- Best Cinematography: Manuel Abramovich for Pornomelancholia

=== Other awards ===
- Kutxabank-New Directors Award: Spare Keys by Jeanne Aslan, Paul Saintillan
  - Special Mention: On Either Sides of the Pond by Parth Saurabh
- Horizontes Award: I Have Electric Dreams by Valentina Maurel
- Zabaltegi-Tabakalera Award: Godland by Hlynur Pálmason
- San Sebastian Audience Award: Argentina, 1985 by Santiago Mitre
- San Sebastian Audience Award for Best European Film: The Beasts by Rodrigo Sorogoyen
- Spanish Cooperation Award: Noise by Natalia Beristáin
- RTVE-Another Look Award: El sastre groc by Isabel Coixet
  - Special Mention: Corsage by Marie Kreutzer
- Irizar Basque Film Award: Cork by Mikel Gurrea
  - Special Mention: To Books and Women I Sing by María Elorza
- TCM Youth Award: To Books and Women I Sing by María Elorza
- Euskadi Basque Country 2030 Agenda Award: Tori and Lokita by Jean-Pierre and Luc Dardenne
- Nest Award: Blue Mountain by Sofía Salinas & Juan David Bohórquez
  - Special Mention: Anabase by Benjamin Goubet
- Dunia Ayaso Award: Tobacco Barns by Rocío Mesa
  - Special Mention: El sastre groc by Isabel Coixet
- FIPRESCI Award: Cork by Mikel Gurrea
- Feroz Zinemaldia Award: The Kings of the World by Laura Mora
- Euskal Gidoigileen Elkartea Award: Cork by Mikel Gurrea & Francisco Kosterlitz
- Sebastiane Award: Something You Said Last Night by Luis De Filippis
- Lurra Greenpeace Award: Alcarràs by Carla Simón
- SIGNIS Award: The Kings of the World by Laura Mora
  - Special Mention: Runner by Marian Mathias

=== Donostia awards ===
- Donostia Award for Lifetime Achievements: Juliette Binoche and David Cronenberg
