= Winter Boy =

2022 French drama film

- Film poster
- French: Le Lycéen
- Directed by: Christophe Honoré
- Written by: Christophe Honoré
- Produced by: Philippe Martin; David Thion
- Starring: Paul Kircher; Juliette Binoche; Vincent Lacoste; Erwan Kepoa Falé
- Cinematography: Rémy Chevrin
- Edited by: Chantal Hymans
- Music by: Yoshihiro Hanno
- Production companies: Auvergne Rhône-Alpes Cinéma; France 2 Cinéma; Les Films Pelléas
- Distributed by: Memento Distribution
- Release dates: September 9, 2022 (TIFF); November 30, 2022 (France)
- Running time: 122 minutes
- Country: France
- Language: French
- Box office: $484,040

Winter Boy (French: Le Lycéen - the high-school boy) is a French drama film, directed by Christophe Honoré and released in 2022. The film stars Paul Kircher as Lucas, a gay teenager coping with the sudden and unexpected death of his father in an accident that may or may not have been suicide.

The film's cast also includes Juliette Binoche as Lucas's mother Isabelle, Vincent Lacoste as his older brother Quentin, Adrien Casse as his boyfriend Oscar and Honoré himself as the father, as well as Xavier Giannoli, Pascal Cervo, Wilfried Capet, Jean-Philippe Salerio, Erwan Kepoa Falé, Anne Kessler and Isabelle Thevenoux in supporting roles.

Winter Boy premiered in the Contemporary World Cinema program at the 2022 Toronto International Film Festival, and screened in competition at the 70th San Sebastián International Film Festival. The film received generally positive reviews, with praise going towards the performances of Kircher, Binoche and Lacoste. For his portrayal of Lucas, Kircher won the Silver Shell for Best Leading Performance and was nominated for the César Award for Most Promising Actor and the Lumière Award for Best Male Revelation.

== Plot ==
17-year-old Lucas attends boarding school in Chambéry. One morning, he is awoken by news his father has been in a car accident. At the family home, Lucas is reunited with his mother Isabelle and learns that his father has died from his injuries. At the funeral, Lucas is secretly visited by his high school sweetheart Oscar.

At home, the family sit down to a dinner filled with intense political discourse. As tensions rise, Lucas suggests his father did not believe in God, and Quentin brings him outside to cool off. Lucas accuses Quentin of abandoning his family to live a stylish life as an artist in Paris, claiming Quentin does not love them. The two brawl but quickly make up.

Lucas stays the night at Oscar's, where the two make love. The next morning, Lucas and Quentin visit their father's grave. Lucas expresses shame in his belief that his father was disappointed by his homosexuality and didn't believe he'd amount to anything, but Quentin passionately disagrees their father felt anything but unconditional love for his children.

The brothers travel to Paris, where Lucas bonds with Quentin's good friend and roommate, the sensitive artist Lilio. With Quentin moody and preoccupied with work, Lucas spends his first day exploring the city, culminating in an anonymous one-night-stand. That night, he sleeps next to Lilio. The two go for a morning jog.

After spending more time with Quentin at the Louvre, Lucas goes back to his apartment to discover Lilio meeting a client. Kicked out, he secretly meets Lilio's client as he's leaving and offers his number for the same services. That evening, Lucas and Lilio visit Lilio's mother's restaurant, where they talk about love and sing karaoke. On the train home, Lucas tries to kiss Lilio but Lilio swiftly rejects him.

Lucas meets with Lilio's client, demanding that the client should later tell Lilio of their meeting, but the two are caught by a furious Quentin. Lucas asks to stay in Paris but Quentin sends him home, warning him not to let his grief turn him reckless.

Back home, Lucas and Isabelle place flowers at the roadside. As grief and shame overcome him, Lucas suggests his father's accident may have been an act of suicide, and Isabelle slaps him. In the car on the way back to school, Lucas takes a vow of silence before punching a mirror and using the broken glass to slit his wrists.

Lucas begins a voluntary stay at a psychiatric hospital. He is visited by Isabelle and Quentin, begins jogging, listens to music, and continues privately struggling with his grief in church. Meanwhile, the patients watch news about climate-related legislation in France.

Lilio visits Lucas and extends his empathy. The two jog to the train station and share a farewell hug. When Isabelle stops by, Lucas begins speaking again and expresses his wish to finally leave the hospital. Isabelle soon releases her anger and accepts the death of her husband, and Isabelle and Lucas finally begin to live again.

== Cast ==
- Paul Kircher as Lucas Ronis
- Vincent Lacoste as Quentin Ronis, Lucas' older brother
- Juliette Binoche as Isabelle Ronis, Lucas and Quentin's mother
- Erwan Kepoa Falé as Lilio Rossio, Quentin's friend and roommate in Paris
- Christophe Honoré as Lucas and Quentin's father
- Adrien Casse as Oscar, Lucas' boyfriend in high school
- Anne Kessler as Sonia
- Elliot Jenicot as Thierry
- Pascal Cervo as Father Benoît
- Lawa Fauquet as Lilio's mother
- Matéo Demurtas as Gabriel

== Reception ==
=== Critical response ===
On the review aggregator website Rotten Tomatoes, 76% of 25 critics' reviews are positive, with an average rating of 6.7/10. Metacritic, which uses a weighted average, assigned the film a score of 64 out of 100, based on 5 critics, indicating "generally favorable" reviews. The film received an average rating of 3.7 out of 5 stars on the French website AlloCiné, based on 34 reviews.

Reviewing the film for The New York Times, Devika Girish said that the film "shines when it allows its actors to quietly play out family dynamics, with Lacoste, Binoche and especially Kircher wearing the many shades of grief with effortless, endearing naturalism." Derek Smith of Slant Magazine noted that "where many films show grief merely as a crippling hindrance, Winter Boy sees it as an emotional state that constantly rises and recedes, disrupting the flow and morphing the meaning of everyday experience" and went on to praise Kircher, Binoche and Lacoste's performances. Describing the former's performance, Smith wrote that Kircher delivered a "remarkably restrained yet captivating debut performance" and that he "imbues Lucas with a precociousness and mischievousness that makes it challenging to easily discern exactly how he's handling his father's untimely death or what exactly drives his increasingly curious behavior." On the latter two, Smith opined that "Binoche and Lacoste are superb in their small roles, and through their respective characters' attempts to both guide and restrain Lucas."

=== Awards and nominations ===
Award	Date of ceremony	Category	Nominee(s)	Result	Ref
San Sebastián International Film Festival	24 September 2022	Silver Shell for Best Leading Performance	Paul Kircher	Won	
Lumière Awards	16 January 2023	Best Male Revelation	Paul Kircher	Nominated	
Lumière Awards	16 January 2023	Best Screenplay	Christophe Honoré	Nominated	
César Awards	24 February 2023	Most Promising Actor	Paul Kircher	Nominated	
