= Who's Stopping Us =

- Theatrical release poster
- Spanish: Quién lo impide
- Directed by: Jonás Trueba
- Written by: Jonás Trueba
- Starring: Candela Recio; Pablo Hoyos; Silvio Aguilar; Rony-Michelle Pinzaru; Pablo Gavira; Claudia Navarro; Marta Casado; Sancho Javiérez
- Cinematography: Jonás Trueba
- Edited by: Marta Velasco
- Music by: Rafael Berrio; Pablo Gavira; Andrei Mazga; Alberto González
- Production company: Los Ilusos Films
- Distributed by: Atalante Cinema
- Release dates: 22 September 2021 (Zinemaldia); 22 October 2021 (Spain)
- Running time: 220 min
- Country: Spain
- Language: Spanish

Who's Stopping Us (Spanish: Quién lo impide) is a 2021 Spanish film directed by Jonás Trueba. Featuring a running time over three and a half hours long, the film is a generational portrait of youth blending documentary and fiction pieces.

== Plot ==
The film tracks a group high schoolers in Madrid, following them from mid-teens to their early 20s.

== Cast ==
- Candela Recio
- Pablo Hoyos
- Silvio Aguilar
- Rony-Michelle Pinzaru
- Pablo Gavira
- Claudia Navarro
- Marta Casado
- Sancho Javiérez

== Production ==
A Los Ilusos Films production, Who's Stopping Us was shot from 2016 to 2021.

== Release ==
The film had its world premiere at the 69th San Sebastián International Film Festival (SSIFF), screened on 22 September 2021 (6th day) as pàrt of the festival's official competition. Distributed by Atalante Cinema, the film was theatrically released in Spain on 22 October 2021.

== Reception ==
Pablo Vázquez of Fotogramas scored 5 out of 5 stars, extolling the absence of any sort of imposture, while noting that its extended runtime perhaps will dissuade cowards, assessing the film to be "a cum laude thesis with which its director embraces his maturity as a filmmaker".

Carmen L. Lobo of La Razón gave it 4 out of 5 stars, considering "its splendid, immersive direction, and the optimism and nostalgia enveloping the film" to be the best thing about Who's Stopping Us.

Quim Casas of El Periódico de Catalunya rated the film with 4 out of 5 stars, considering that the vast amount of material "has taken an exciting form, in different blocks perfectly articulated with each other."

Jonathan Romney of ScreenDaily wrote that the film is "not as revelatory as it intends, this is an only intermittently fascinating watch, an over-extended experiment that doesn't quite hold its own against 21st-century cinema's more incisive portraits of youth".

Who's Stopping Us closed Cahiers du Cinéma's top 10 films of 2022 list.

== Accolades ==
Year	Award	Category	Nominee(s)	Result	Ref.
2021	69th San Sebastián International Film Festival	Silver Shell for Best Supporting Performance	The whole cast	Won	
2021	69th San Sebastián International Film Festival	Feroz Zinemaldia Award		Won	
2021	69th San Sebastián International Film Festival	FIPRESCI Award		Won	
2022	9th Feroz Awards	Arrebato Award (Non-Fiction Film)		Nominated	
2022	77th CEC Medals	Best Documentary Film		Won	
2022	36th Goya Awards	Best Documentary Film		Won	
2022	9th Platino Awards	Best Documentary Film		Nominated	

== See also ==
- List of Spanish films of 2021
