= Golden Shell =

Highest prize awarded at the San Sebastián Film Festival

- Official logo
- Location: San Sebastián, Basque Country
- Country: Spain
- Presented by: San Sebastián International Film Festival
- Currently held by: Mike Leigh for Tender Loving Care (2026)
- Website: sansebastianfestival.com

The Golden Shell (Note: Also referred to in English-language sources as the Golden Conch.) (Spanish: Concha de Oro; Basque: Urrezko Maskorra) is the highest prize given to a competing film at the San Sebastián International Film Festival. It was introduced in 1957.

== History ==
In 1953 and 1954, the highest prize had been called the Gran Premio. In 1955 and 1956 it was replaced by the Silver Shell. Since 1957, it has been called Golden Shell.

French filmmaker Diane Kurys was the first woman to win the award, for Entre Nous (1983). As of 2026, only eight female filmmakers have won the prize alongside Kurys, including: Yeşim Ustaoğlu, Mariana Rondón, Dea Kulumbegashvili, Alina Grigore, Laura Mora, Jaione Camborda, and Alauda Ruiz de Azúa.

Spanish filmmaker Rafael Gil was the first winner for I Was a Parish Priest (1953). While six filmmakers have won the it twice: American filmmaker Francis Ford Coppola (in 1969 and 1984); Iranian filmmaker Bahman Ghobadi (in 2004 and 2006); Mexican filmmaker Arturo Ripstein (in 1993 and 2000); and Spanish filmmakers Imanol Uribe (in 1994 and 1996), Isaki Lacuesta (in 2011 and 2018), and Manuel Gutiérrez Aragón (in 1982 and 1986).

== Winners ==
Pietro Germi won in 1956.

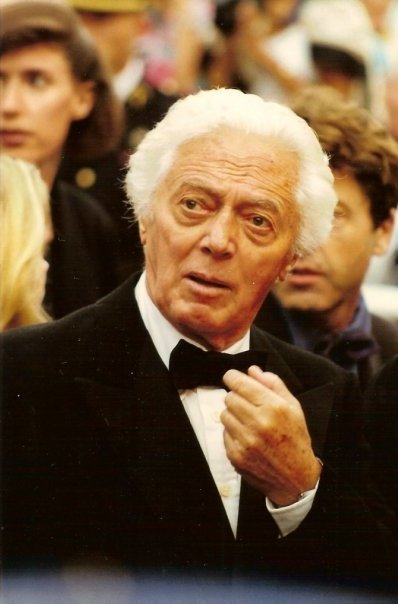
Dino Risi won in 1957.

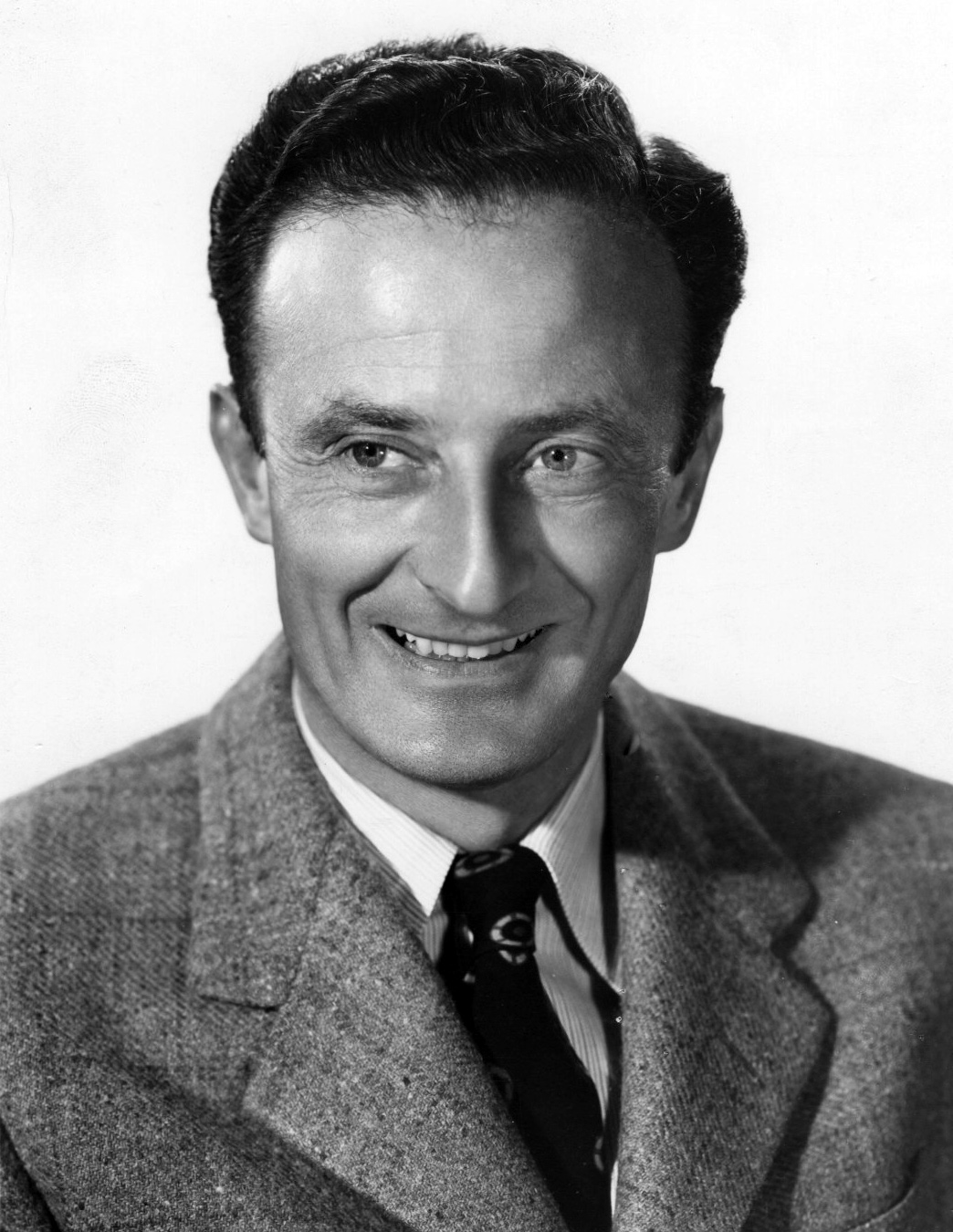
Fred Zinnemann won in 1959.

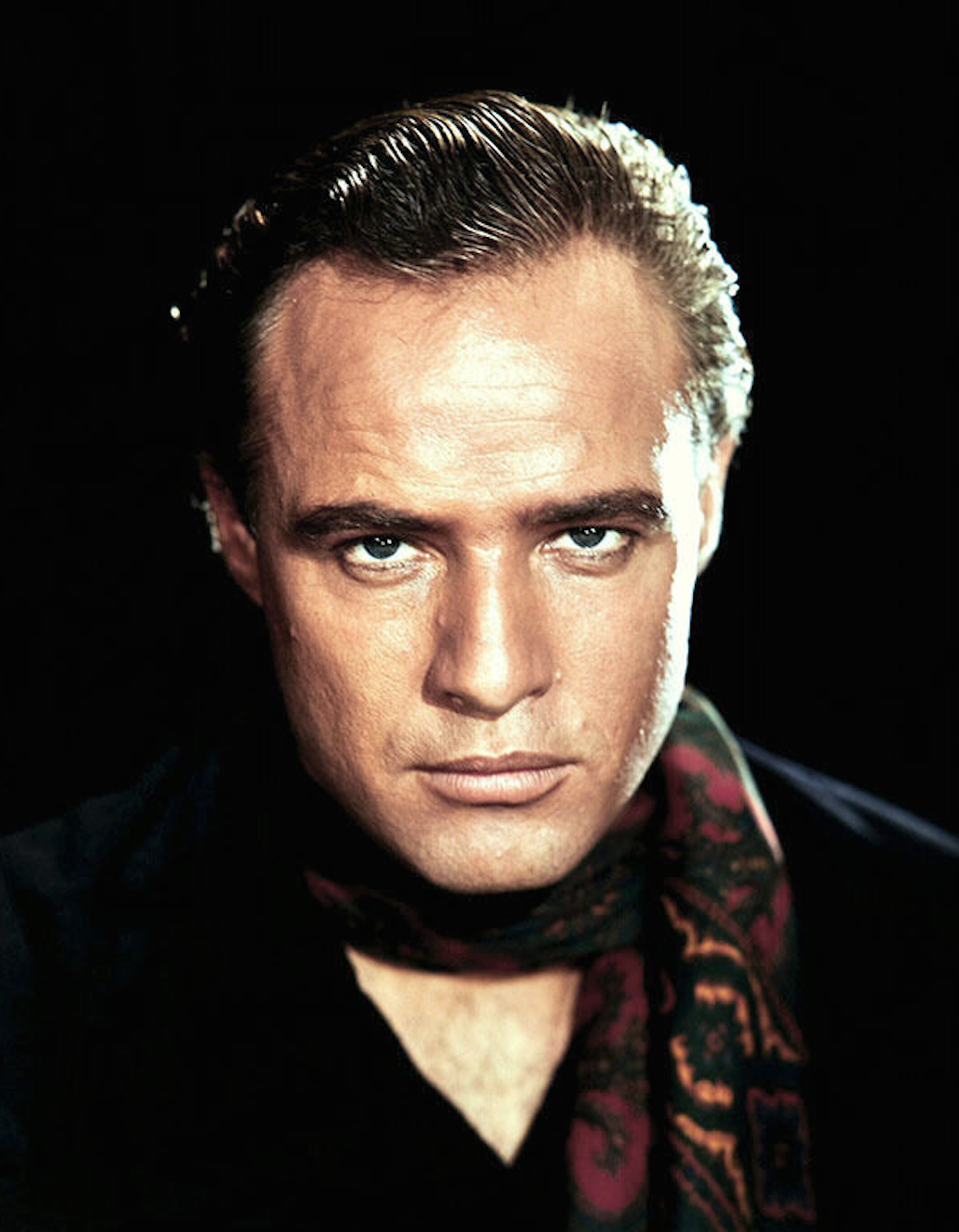
Marlon Brando won in 1961.

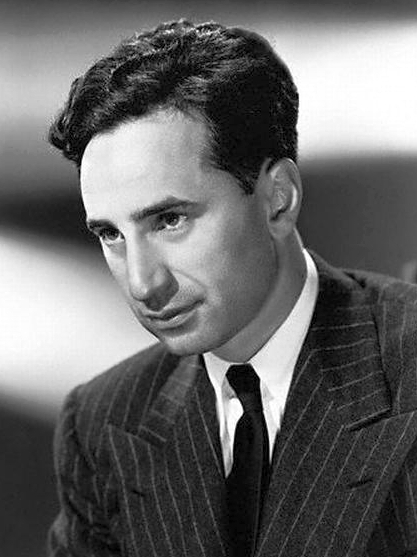
Elia Kazan won in 1964.

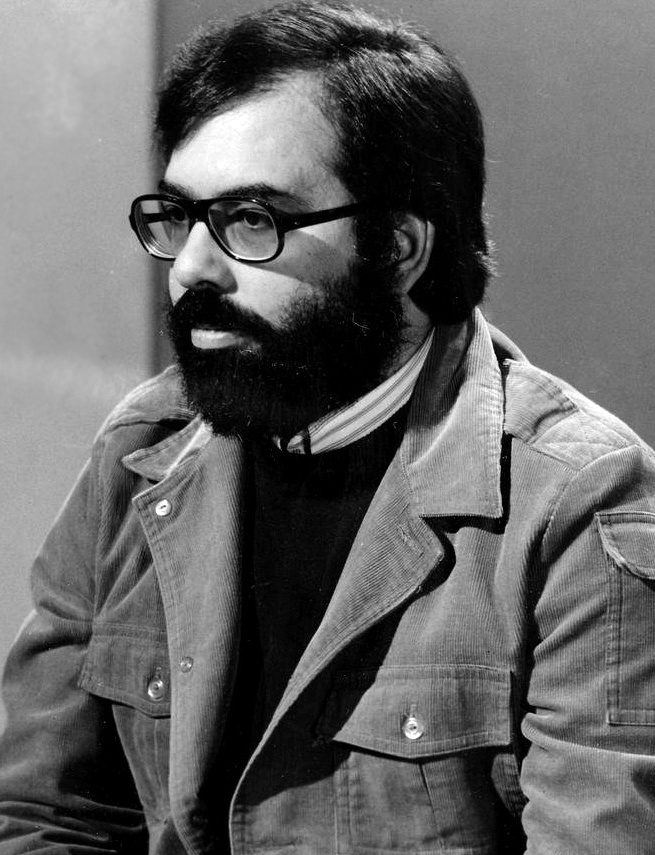
Francis Ford Coppola won twice, in 1969 and 1984.

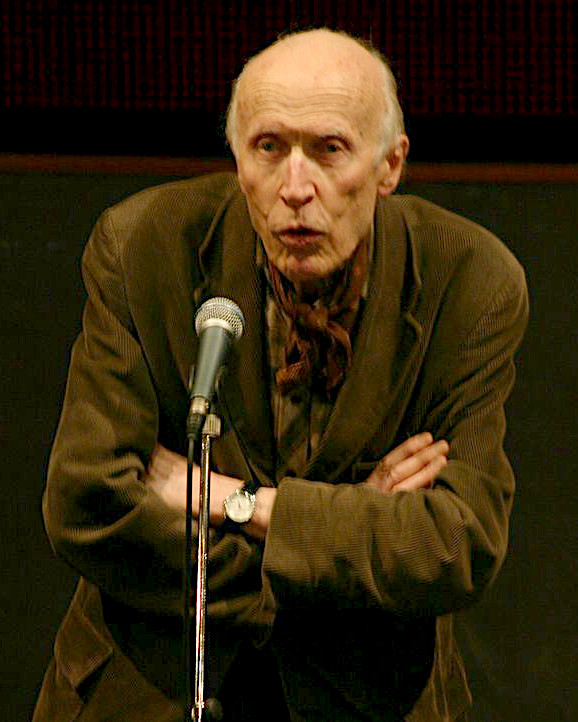
Éric Rohmer won in 1971.

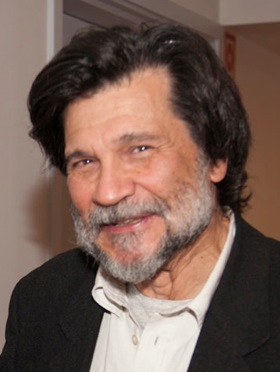
Víctor Erice won in 1973.

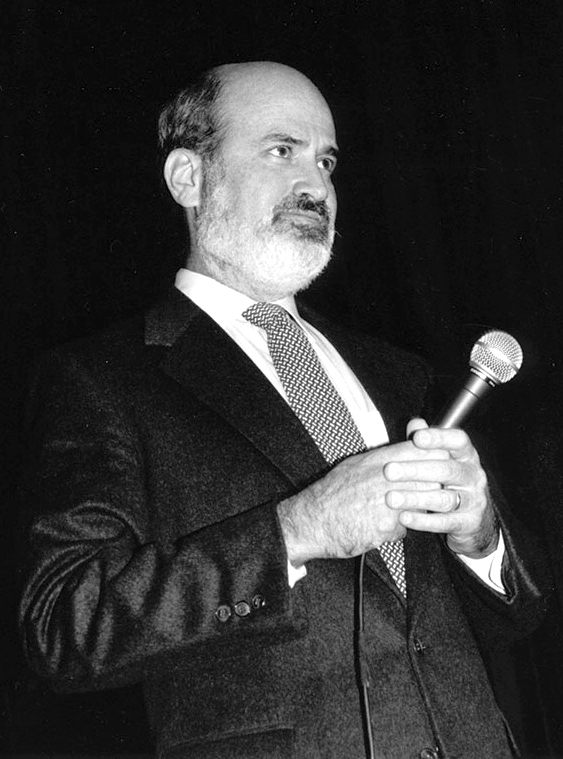
Terrence Malick won in 1974.

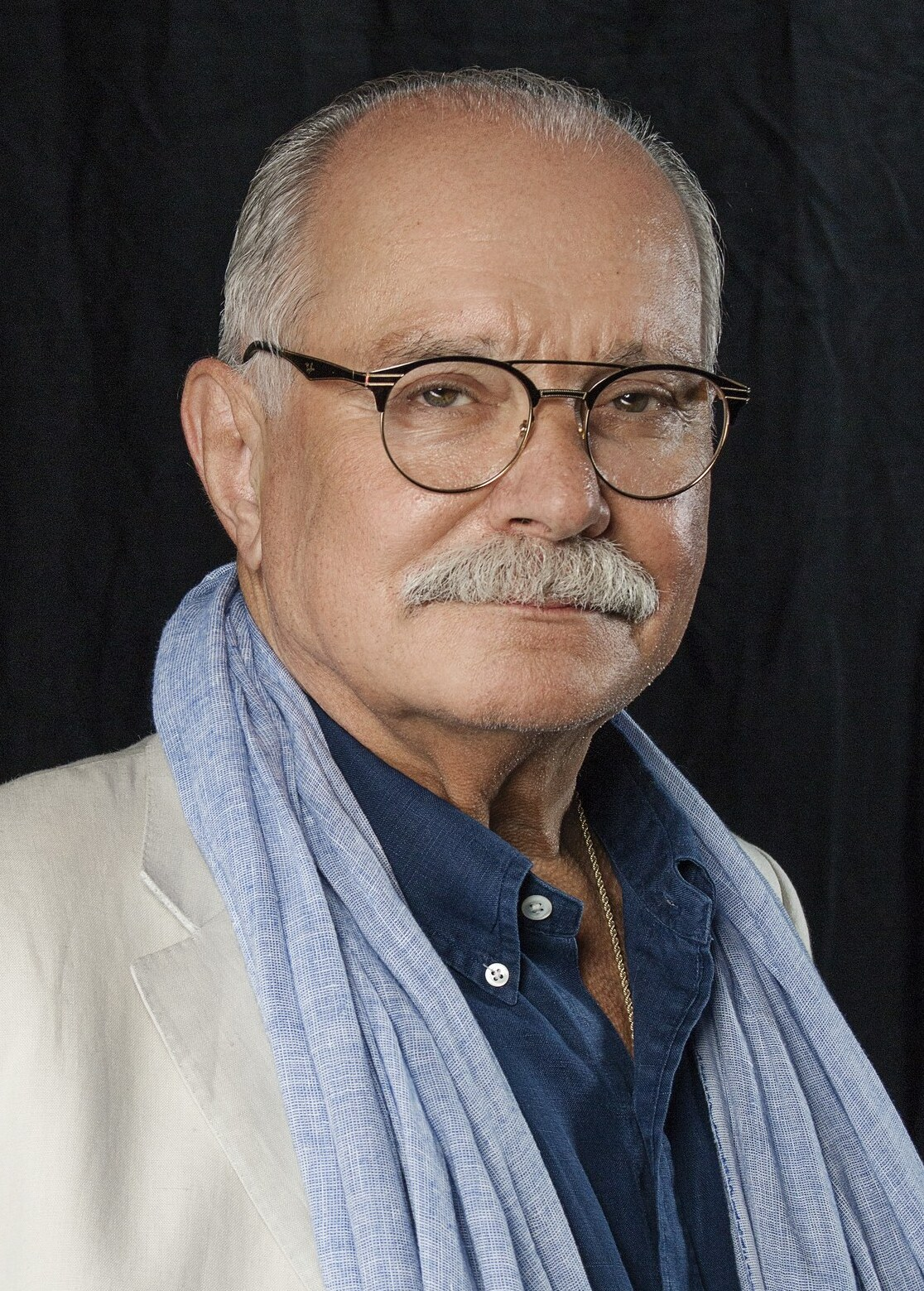
Nikita Mikhalkov won in 1977.

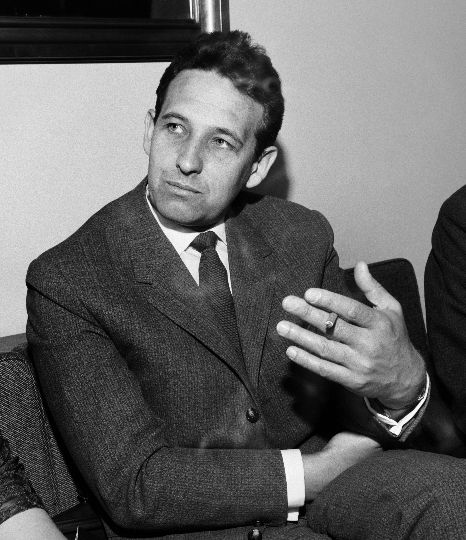
Andrzej Wajda won in 1980.

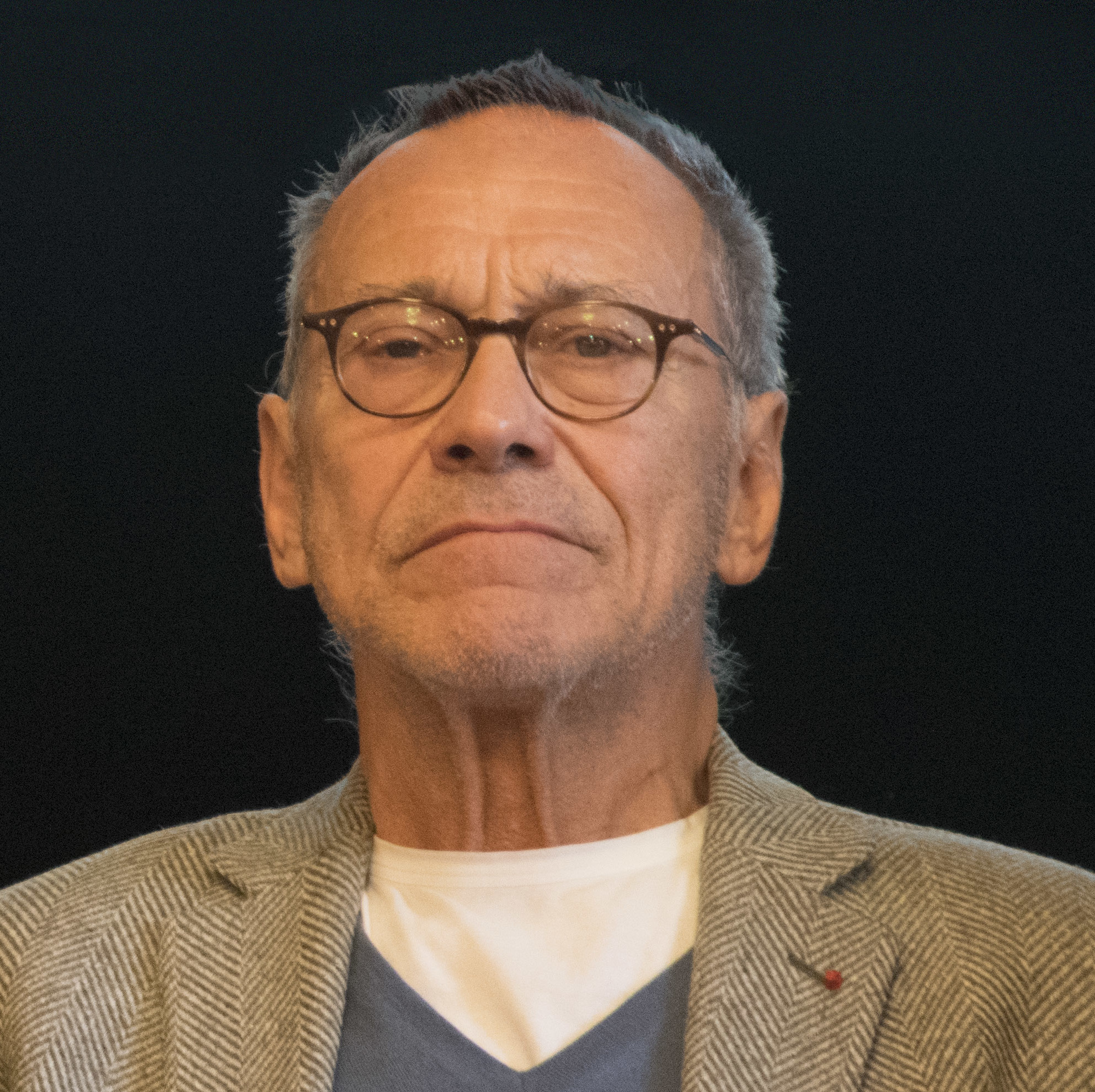
Andrei Konchalovsky won in 1989.

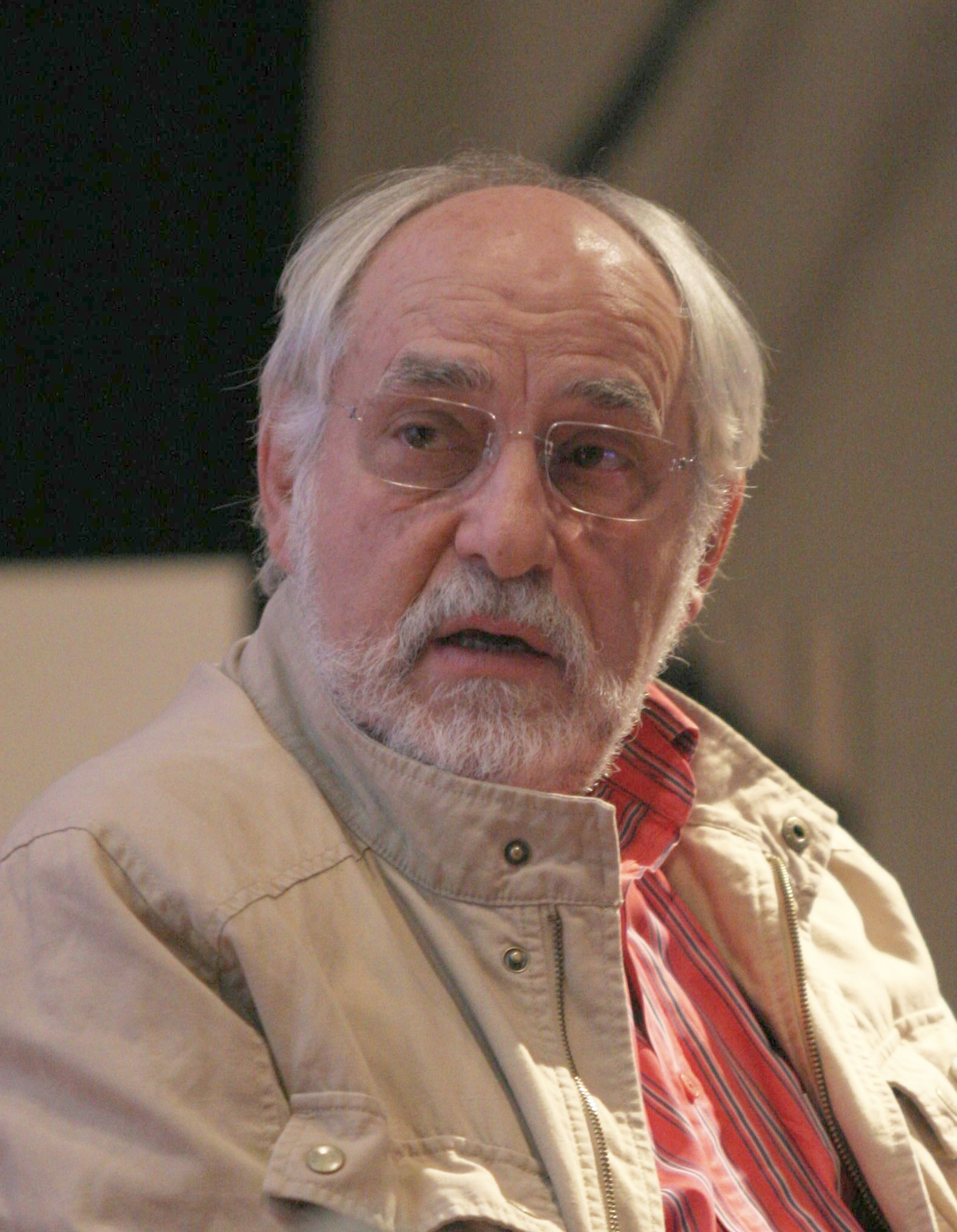
Arturo Ripstein won twice, in 1993 and 2001.

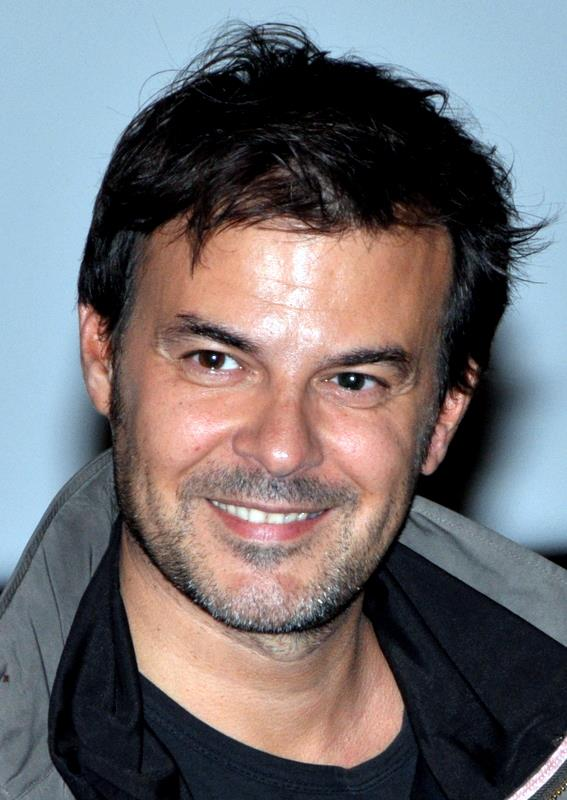
François Ozon won in 2012.

=== 1950s ===
Year	English Title	Original Title	Director(s)	Production Country
1953	I Was a Parish Priest	La Guerra de Dios	Rafael Gil	Spain
1954	Cursed Mountain	Sierra maldita	Antonio del Amo	Spain
1955	Days of Love	Giorni d'amore	Giuseppe De Santis	Italy
1956	The Railroad Man	Il ferroviere	Pietro Germi	Italy
1957	Oh! Sabella	La nonna Sabella	Dino Risi	Italy
1958	Eve Wants to Sleep	Ewa chce spać	Tadeusz Chmielewski	Poland
1959	The Nun's Story		Fred Zinnemann	United States

=== 1960s ===
Year	English Title	Original Title	Director(s)	Production Country
1960	Romeo, Juliet and Darkness	Romeo, Julie a tma	Jiří Weiss	Czechoslovakia
1961	One-Eyed Jacks		Marlon Brando	United States
1962	Arturo's Island	L'isola di Arturo	Damiano Damiani	Italy
1963	Mafioso		Alberto Lattuada	Italy
1964	America America		Elia Kazan	United States
1965	Golden Queen	Zlatá reneta	Otakar Vávra	Czechoslovakia
1965	Mirage		Edward Dmytryk	United States
1966	I Was Happy Here		Desmond Davis	United Kingdom
1967	Two for the Road		Stanley Donen	United States
1968	The Long Day's Dying		Peter Collinson	United Kingdom
1969	The Rain People		Francis Ford Coppola	United States

=== 1970s ===
Year	English Title	Original Title	Director(s)	Production Country
1970	Dead of Summer	Ondata di calore	Nelo Risi	Italy
1971	Claire's Knee	Le Genou de Claire	Éric Rohmer	France
1972	The Glass House		Tom Gries	United States
1973	The Spirit of the Beehive	El espíritu de la colmena	Víctor Erice	Spain
1974	Badlands		Terrence Malick	United States
1975	Poachers	Furtivos	José Luis Borau	Spain
1976	Gypsies Are Found Near Heaven	Табор уходит в небо	Emil Loteanu	Soviet Union
1977	An Unfinished Piece for Mechanical Piano	Неоконченная пьеса для механического пианино	Nikita Mikhalkov	Soviet Union
1978	Alambrista!		Robert M. Young	United States
1979	Autumn Marathon	Осенний марафон	Georgiy Daneliya	Soviet Union

=== 1980s ===
Year	English Title	Original Title	Director(s)	Production Country
1980	The Orchestra Conductor	Dyrygent	Andrzej Wajda	Poland
1981	Tales of Ordinary Madness	Storie di ordinaria follia	Marco Ferreri	Italy
1982	Demons in the Garden	Demonios en el jardín	Manuel Gutiérrez Aragón	Spain
1983	Entre Nous		Diane Kurys	France
1984	Rumble Fish		Francis Ford Coppola	United States
1985	Yesterday		Radosław Piwowarski	Poland
1986	Half of Heaven	La mitad del cielo	Manuel Gutiérrez Aragón	Spain
1987	Wedding in Galilee	عرس الجليل	Michel Khleifi	Belgium, France
1988	On the Black Hill		Andrew Grieve	United Kingdom
1989	Homer and Eddie		Andrei Konchalovsky	United States
1989	La nación clandestina		Jorge Sanjinés	Bolivia

=== 1990s ===
Year	English Title	Original Title	Director(s)	Production Country
1990	Letters from Alou	Las cartas de Alou	Montxo Armendáriz	Spain
1991	Butterfly Wings	Alas de mariposa	Juanma Bajo Ulloa	Spain
1992	A Place in the World	Un lugar en el mundo	Adolfo Aristarain	Argentina
1993	The Beginning and the End	Principio y fin	Arturo Ripstein	Mexico
1993	Sara	سارا	Dariush Mehrjui	Iran
1994	Días contados		Imanol Uribe	Spain
1995	Margaret's Museum		Mort Ransen	Canada, United Kingdom
1996	Bwana		Imanol Uribe	Spain
1996	Trojan Eddie		Gillies MacKinnon	Ireland
1997	The Swindle	Rien ne va plus	Claude Chabrol	France
1998	Wind with the Gone	El viento se llevó lo qué	Alejandro Agresti	Argentina, France, Netherlands, Spain
1999	C'est quoi la vie?		François Dupeyron	France

=== 2000s ===
Year	English Title	Original Title	Director(s)	Production Country
2000	The Ruination of Men	La perdición de los hombres	Arturo Ripstein	Mexico, Spain
2001	A Cab for Three	Taxi para tres	Orlando Lübbert	Chile
2002	Mondays in the Sun	Los lunes al sol	Fernando León de Aranoa	Spain, France, Italy
2003	Gun-shy	Schussangst	Dito Tsintsadze	Germany
2004	Turtles Can Fly	کیسەڵەکانیش دەفڕن	Bahman Ghobadi	Iran, France, Iraq
2005	Something Like Happiness	Štěstí	Bohdan Sláma	Czech Republic
2006	Half Moon	نیوەمانگ	Bahman Ghobadi	Iran
2006	Mon fils à moi		Martial Fougeron	France
2007	A Thousand Years of Good Prayers		Wayne Wang	United States
2008	Pandora's Box	Pandora'nın Kutusu	Yeşim Ustaoğlu	Turkey
2009	City of Life and Death	南京！南京！	Lu Chuan	China

=== 2010s ===
Year	English Title	Original Title	Director(s)	Production Country
2010	Neds		Peter Mullan	United Kingdom, France, Italy
2011	Los pasos dobles		Isaki Lacuesta	Spain, Switzerland
2012	In the House	Dans la maison	François Ozon	France
2013	Bad Hair	Pelo malo	Mariana Rondón	Venezuela, Peru, Germany
2014	Magical Girl		Carlos Vermut	Spain
2015	Sparrows	Þrestir	Rúnar Rúnarsson	Denmark, Iceland
2016	I Am Not Madame Bovary	我不是潘金莲	Feng Xiaogang	China
2017	The Disaster Artist		James Franco	United States
2018	Between Two Waters	Entre dos aguas	Isaki Lacuesta	Spain
2019	Pacified	Pacificado	Paxton Winters	Brazil

=== 2020s ===
Year	English Title	Original Title	Director(s)	Production Country
2020	Beginning	დასაწყისი	Dea Kulumbegashvili	Georgia, France
2021	Blue Moon	Crai Nou	Alina Grigore	Romania
2022	The Kings of the World	Los reyes del mundo	Laura Mora	Colombia
2023	The Rye Horn	O corno	Jaione Camborda	Spain, Portugal, Belgium
2024	Afternoons of Solitude	Tardes de soledad	Albert Serra	Spain, Portugal, France
2025	Sundays	Los domingos	Alauda Ruiz de Azúa	Spain
2026	Tender Loving Care		Mike Leigh	United Kingdom

== See also ==
- Silver Shell for Best Director
- Silver Shell for Best Leading Performance
- Silver Shell for Best Actor
- Silver Shell for Best Actress
- Donostia Award
- Sebastiane Award
