= The Substitute (2022 film) =

- Film poster
- Spanish: El suplente
- Directed by: Diego Lerman
- Screenplay by: Diego Lerman; María Meira; Luciana De Mello
- Starring: Juan Minujín; Bárbara Lennie; Alfredo Castro; Rita Cortese; María Merlino
- Cinematography: Wojciech Staroń
- Edited by: Alejandro Brodersohn
- Music by: José Villalobos
- Production companies: Campo Cine; Vivo film; Pimienta Films; Arcadia Motion Pictures
- Release dates: 11 September 2022 (TIFF); 20 October 2022 (Argentina); 13 January 2023 (Spain)
- Countries: Argentina; Spain; Italy; Mexico; France
- Language: Spanish

The Substitute (Spanish: El suplente) is a 2022 internationally co-produced drama film directed by Diego Lerman and starring Juan Minujín and Bárbara Lennie alongside Alfredo Castro, Rita Cortese, and María Merlino. It is a Latin-American and European co-production among companies from Argentina, Spain, Italy, Mexico, and France.

== Plot ==
The film follows the mishaps of an interim teacher (Lucio) in the suburbs of Buenos Aires, as he is forced to take a stance once one of his students is threatened by a druglord.

== Cast ==
- Juan Minujín as Lucio
- Bárbara Lennie as Mariela
- Alfredo Castro
- María Merlino
- Lucas Arrua as Dilan
- Rita Cortese
- Renata Lerman as Sol

== Production ==
In 2019, the project (previously known under the working title El maestro de literatura) participated in the 8th Europe-Latin America Co-Production Forum, a platform of the San Sebastián International Film Festival created to foster new audiovisual co-productions. The screenplay was penned by Diego Lerman, María Meira, and Luciana De Mello. It is a co-production by companies from Argentina, Spain, Italy, Mexico, and France. Filming started by late 2021. Shooting locations included Isla Maciel (Dock Sud, Avellaneda).

== Release ==
The film was picked up in the 'Special Presentations' selection of the 47th Toronto International Film Festival, where it made its world premiere on 11 September 2022. It was also selected within 70th San Sebastián International Film Festival's official selection line-up and had its NY premiere as the opening night film of the 22nd Havana Film Festival New York. It was released in Argentina on 20 October 2022. It is set for a 13 January 2023 theatrical release date in Spain.

== Accolades ==
| Year | Award | Category | Nominee(s) | Result | Ref. |
|---|---|---|---|---|---|
| 2022 | 70th San Sebastián International Film Festival | Silver Shell for Best Supporting Performance | Renata Lerman | Won | |
| 2022 | 22nd Havana Film Festival New York | Havana Star Prize for Best Director | Diego Lerman | Won | |

== See also ==
- List of Argentine films of 2022
- List of Spanish films of 2023
