= Donostia Award =

Film award

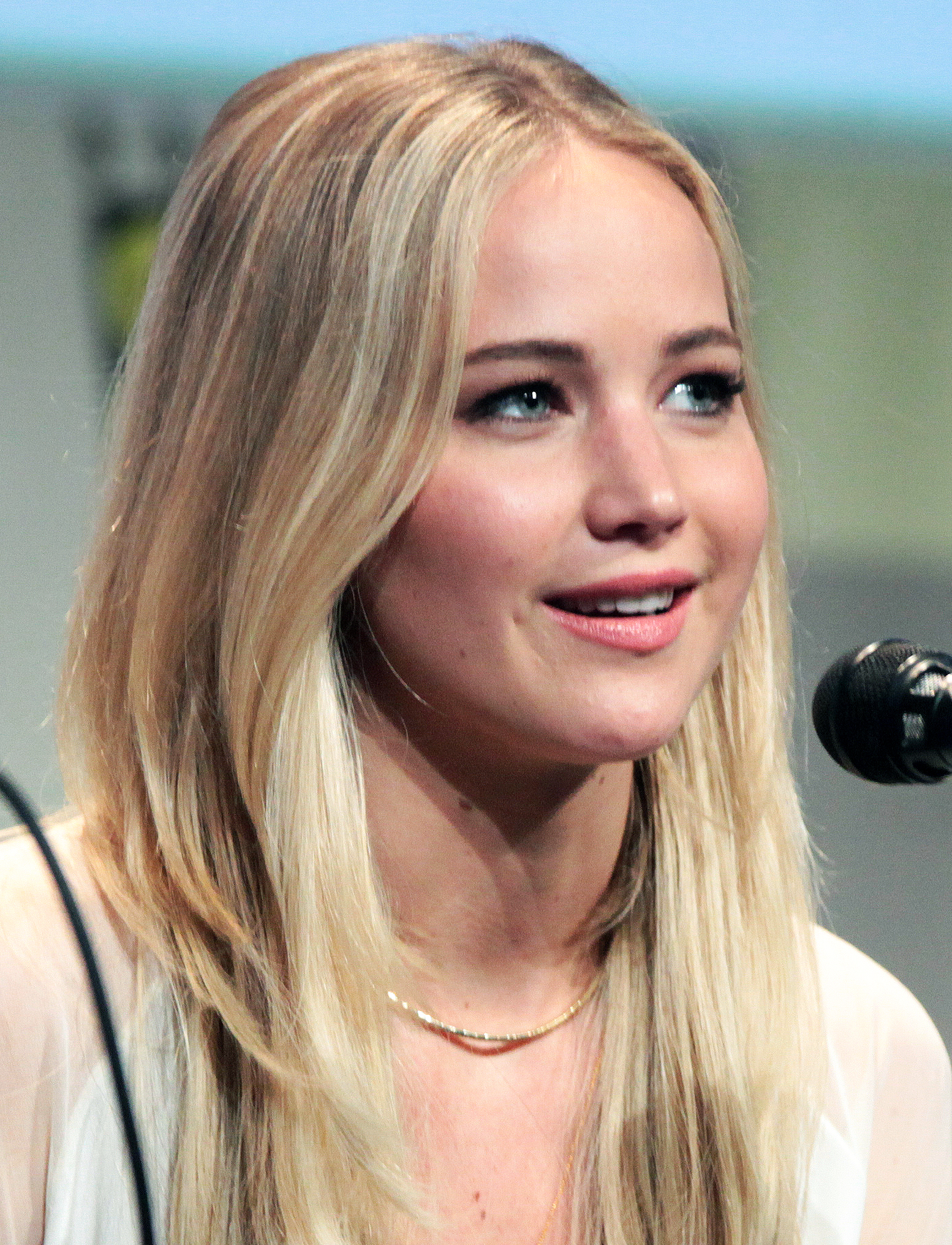
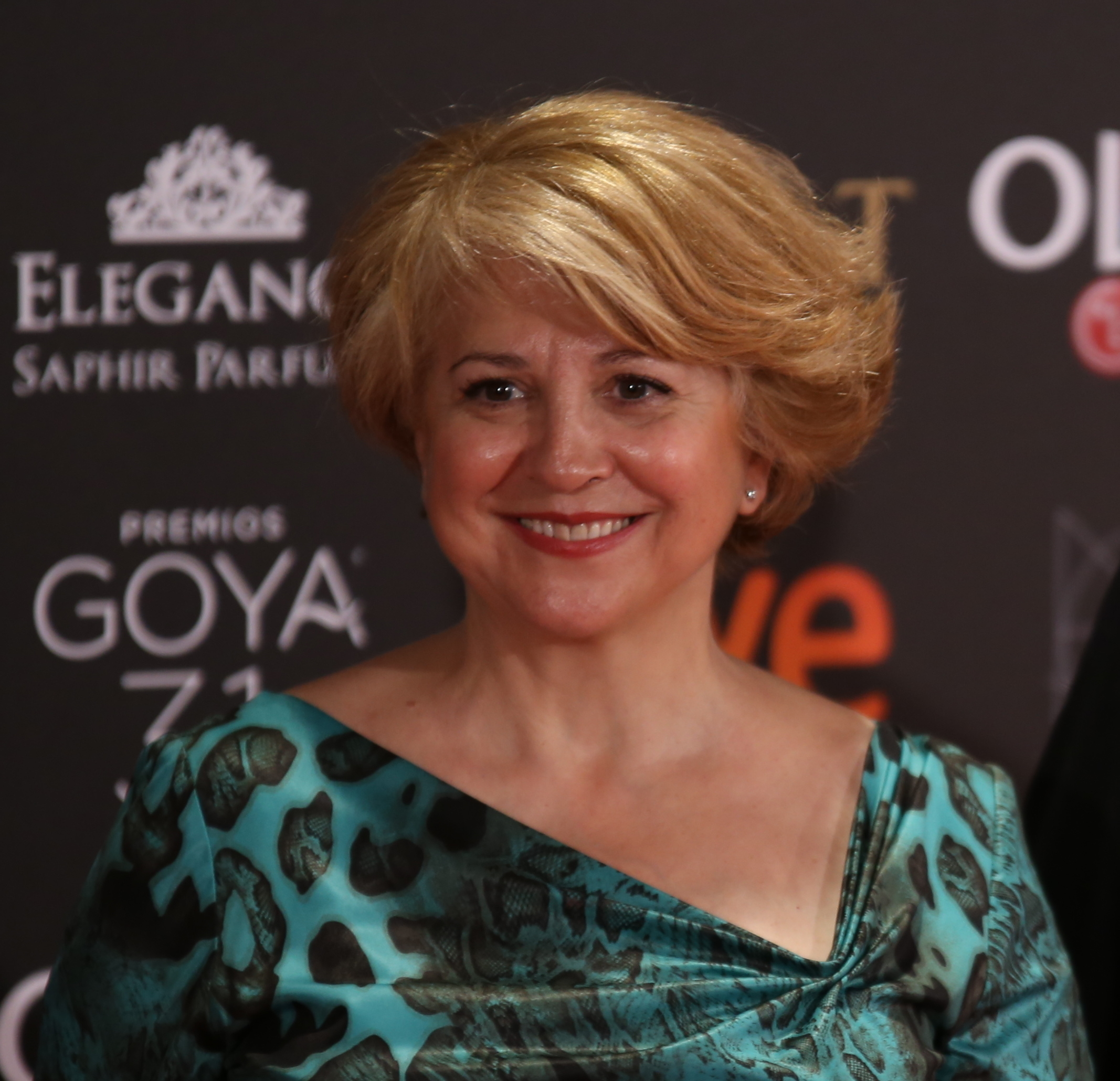
- The 2025 recipients: Jennifer Lawrence and Esther García
- Awarded for: To honor artists' achievements and contributions to cinema
- Country: Spain
- Presented by: San Sebastián International Film Festival
- First award: 1986
- Website: http://www.sansebastianfestival.com/in/indice.php?ap=2

The Donostia Award (Spanish: Premio Donostia; Basque: Donostia Saria) is an honorary award created in 1986 which is given every year to a number of actors and filmmakers in the San Sebastián International Film Festival. It derives its name from Donostia, the Basque name of San Sebastián.

== Recipients ==
Year	Recipient	Profession	Nationality	Notes
1986	Gregory Peck	Actor	United States	
1986	Gene Tierney	Actress	United States	The award to Tierney was announced prior to the festival, but was not handed as Tierney did not eventually travel to San Sebastián.
1987	Glenn Ford	Actor	Canada / United States	
1988	Vittorio Gassman	Actor, filmmaker and screenwriter	Italy	
1989	Bette Davis	Actress	United States	
1990	Claudette Colbert	Actress	United States	
1991	Anthony Perkins	Actor	United States	
1992	Lauren Bacall	Actress	United States	
1993	Robert Mitchum	Actor	United States	
1994	Lana Turner	Actress	United States	
1995	Susan Sarandon	Actress	United States	
1995	Catherine Deneuve	Actress	France	
1996	Al Pacino	Actor	United States	
1997	Michael Douglas	Actor and producer	United States	
1997	Jeremy Irons	Actor	United Kingdom	
1998	Jeanne Moreau	Actress and filmmaker	France	
1998	Anthony Hopkins	Actor, filmmaker and producer	United Kingdom	
1998	John Malkovich	Actor	United States	
1999	Anjelica Huston	Actress	United States	
1999	Fernando Fernán Gómez	Actor, screenwriter and filmmaker	Spain	
1999	Vanessa Redgrave	Actress	United Kingdom	
2000	Michael Caine	Actor	United Kingdom	
2000	Robert De Niro	Actor	United States	
2001	Julie Andrews	Actress and singer	United Kingdom	The award was announced prior to the festival, but was not handed in person as Andrews cancelled her trip to San Sebastián in the aftermath of the September 11 attacks.
2001	Warren Beatty	Actor and filmmaker	United States	The award was announced prior to the festival, but was not handed in person as Beatty cancelled his trip to San Sebastián in the aftermath of the September 11 attacks.
2001	Francisco Rabal	Actor	Spain	Rabal died weeks before the festival, and the award was handed posthumously to his grandson Liberto Rabal.
2002	Jessica Lange	Actress	United States	
2002	Bob Hoskins	Actor and filmmaker	United Kingdom	
2002	Dennis Hopper	Actor and filmmaker	United States	
2002	Francis Ford Coppola	Filmmaker, producer and screenwriter	United States	
2003	Robert Duvall	Actor and filmmaker	United States	
2003	Sean Penn	Actor and filmmaker	United States	
2003	Isabelle Huppert	Actress	France	
2004	Annette Bening	Actress	United States	
2004	Jeff Bridges	Actor	United States	
2004	Woody Allen	Actor, filmmaker and screenwriter	United States	
2005	Willem Dafoe	Actor	United States	
2005	Ben Gazzara	Actor	United States	
2006	Max von Sydow	Actor	Sweden / France	
2006	Matt Dillon	Actor	United States	
2007	Liv Ullmann	Actress and filmmaker	Norway	
2007	Richard Gere	Actor	United States	
2008	Meryl Streep	Actress	United States	
2008	Antonio Banderas	Actor and filmmaker	Spain	
2009	Ian McKellen	Actor	United Kingdom	
2010	Julia Roberts	Actress	United States	
2011	Glenn Close	Actress	United States	
2012	Oliver Stone	Filmmaker, producer and screenwriter	United States	
2012	Ewan McGregor	Actor	United Kingdom	
2012	Tommy Lee Jones	Actor	United States	
2012	John Travolta	Actor	United States	
2012	Dustin Hoffman	Actor	United States	
2013	Carmen Maura	Actress	Spain	
2013	Hugh Jackman	Actor	Australia	
2014	Denzel Washington	Actor, producer and filmmaker	United States	
2014	Benicio del Toro	Actor	Puerto Rico	
2015	Emily Watson	Actress	United Kingdom	
2016	Sigourney Weaver	Actress	United States	
2016	Ethan Hawke	Actor, filmmaker and screenwriter	United States	
2017	Ricardo Darín	Actor and producer	Argentina	
2017	Monica Bellucci	Actress	Italy	
2017	Agnès Varda	Filmmaker, screenwriter and artist	France	
2018	Hirokazu Kore-eda	Filmmaker, producer, screenwriter and editor	Japan	
2018	Danny DeVito	Actor and filmmaker	United States	
2018	Judi Dench	Actress	United Kingdom	
2019	Penélope Cruz	Actress	Spain	
2019	Costa-Gavras	Filmmaker, producer and screenwriter	Greece / France	
2019	Donald Sutherland	Actor	Canada	
2020	Viggo Mortensen	Actor	United States / Denmark	
2021	Johnny Depp	Actor	United States	
2021	Marion Cotillard	Actress	France	
2022	Juliette Binoche	Actress	France	
2022	David Cronenberg	Filmmaker, screenwriter and actor	Canada	
2023	Javier Bardem	Actor	Spain	The award to Bardem was announced for the 2023 edition, but the award event was later postponed for the 2024 edition due to the 2023 SAG-AFTRA strike.
2023	Víctor Erice	Filmmaker and screenwriter	Spain	
2023	Hayao Miyazaki	Animator and filmmaker	Japan	Miyazaki was handed the award virtually from Tokyo.
2024	Cate Blanchett	Actress	Australia	
2024	Pedro Almodóvar	Filmmaker and screenwriter	Spain	
2025	Esther García	Producer	Spain	
2025	Jennifer Lawrence	Actress	United States	Lawrence became the youngest recipient of the award ever.
2026	Werner Herzog	Filmmaker and actor	Germany	
2026	Naomi Watts	Actress	United Kingdom	

== See also ==
- Golden Shell for Best Film
- Silver Shell for Best Director
- Silver Shell for Best Leading Performance
- Silver Shell for Best Actor
- Silver Shell for Best Actress
- Sebastiane Award
