= Mon fils à moi =

2006 French film

Mon fils a moi
- Directed by: Martial Fougeron
- Starring: Nathalie Baye; Victor Sevaux; Michèle Moretti
- Production companies: Moby Dick Films; Why Not Productions; France 2 Cinéma
- Distributed by: Mars Distribution
- Release date: 2006
- Country: France
- Language: French

Mon fils a moi is a French 2006 film directed by Martial Fougeron. The film is about an unbalanced mother (Nathalie Baye) bullying her 12-year-old son Julien (Victor Sevaux).

== Plot ==
The mother intercepts and destroys letters from Julien's girlfriend and does not allow him to see her. He is not allowed to wear clothing he gets from his grandmother or buys with his own money. She rejects angrily a gift from the boy. She enters the bathroom while he is naked, when he covers his genitals she demands that he exposes them. She asks him to lie to his soccer trainer about why he can't come to a training session, in order that she and the boy can be together. Also she does not tell him about the death of his beloved grandmother until after the funeral. Julien's father is always busy with his work and supports his wife's behavior. Only Julien's elder sister is concerned about the negative effect of the mother's behavior on Julien's well-being, but the parents refuse to listen to her. Nevertheless the mother also sometimes shows some kind of love for Julien: she likes dancing with him in the living room, playing soccer with him, and going together to the swimming pool. She often comes to his school to discuss Julien's progress. However, Julien's school achievements deteriorate. At school the mother tells the teacher that she does not know what the problem is.

Julien secretly goes to his girlfriend's party. His parents go the girl's house to take him home. Julien's sister phones him to warn him that they are on their way. Julien hurries back home on his bike. The parents meet him, grab him and put him in the car, leaving his bike on the road. At home Julien is beaten by his mother. He alarms the police and tells that he may commit suicide. Four police officers arrive at the house. Reluctantly the mother lets them talk with him in a separate room. Julien does not fully speak out. The police check his arms and trunk for physical harm but do not see anything. They leave. Julien is punished by the removal of most of his possessions from his room, and by giving him limited access to his room. Julien gets an alarm gun from his schoolmates and threatens his mother with it. However, she is not impressed. Then he threatens her with a small knife, and she dares him to kill her. At last he stabs his mother. A scene already shown in flash-forward at the start of the film is repeated, in which somebody is taken on a stretcher from the house to an ambulance; now it turns out that it is the mother. A voice-over tells that she survives and does not blame her son.
