= Sebastiane Award =

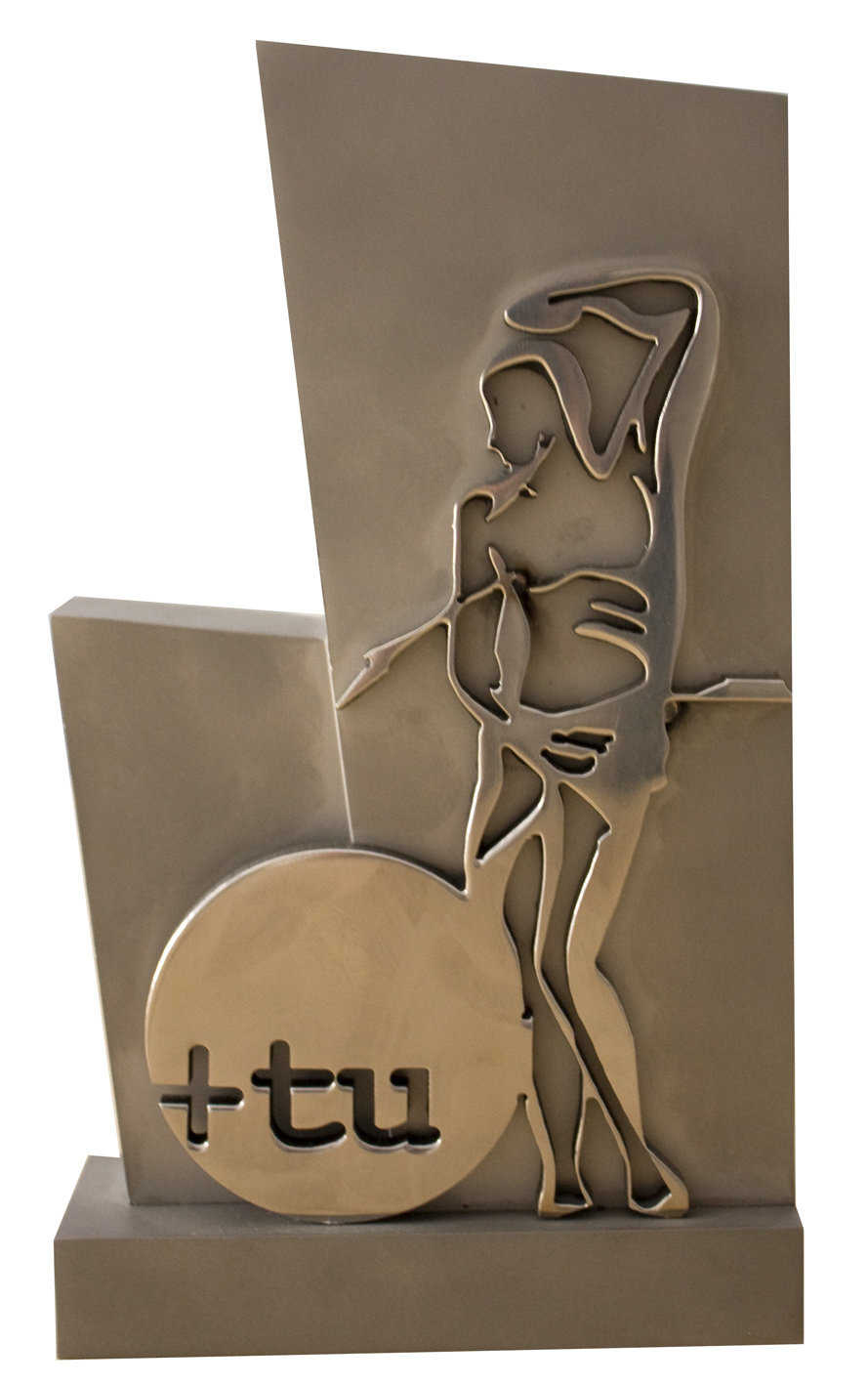

Sebastiane Award is a prize delivered in September, since 2000, to a film or documentary screened during the San Sebastián International Film Festival that best reflects the values and reality of lesbians, gays, bisexuals, and transgender people.

The selection of the winner film is carried out between all sections that make up the Festival: Official Section, Zabaltegi, Horizontes Latinos, Made Spain, etc.

== History ==
In 2000, the idea was raised of creating a gay and lesbian film award in the frame of San Sebastián Film Festival.

This idea came up among Gehitu members, a gay, lesbian, bisexual and transgender association from the Basque Country. The goal intended, as it was already happening from 1987 on with the Teddy Award in the Berlinale, was that the prize would help gay-theme movies have more relevance in movies theatres as well as in mass media.

Krámpack (Nico and Dani in English), from the film director Cesc Gay, was the first film awarded with Sebastiane Prize. The film reflected the sexual awakening of two teenagers, as one comes to terms with his homosexuality and the other with his heterosexuality. The jury of this edition was made up by the writer Luis G. Martin, film critic Begoña del Teso, Angel Retamar from ZERO magazine, Gehitu members, Patricia García and David Montero.

The name given to the Award, "Sebastiane", honoured the film with the same name directed in 1976 by British Derek Jarman. It was his first film, in which he portrayed introspectively the Roman soldier Sebastian, martyr of Christianity, later a Middle Age Saint and eventually turned into a homoerotic icon.

Saint Sebastian, patron saint of San Sebastiano fuori le mura, is a root symbol of the city itself, venue of the Festival, but likewise it is too a symbol of the homosexual culture itself, which serves a perfect picture to represent the Sebastiane Prize.

== Award ==
The Prize figurine was designed by Enrique Rojas. It represents the silhouette in metal of the image that traditionally has pictured San Sebastián: a half naked body, toros pierced by arrows.

== Winners ==
- 2000: Krámpack (Nico and Dani), by Cesc Gay.
- 2001: Le fate ignoranti (The Ignorant Fairies), by Ferzan Özpetek.
- 2002: Tani tatuwen piyabanna (Flying with one wing), by Asoka Handagama.
- 2003: Le soleil assassiné, by Abdelkrim Bahloul.
- 2004: Beautiful Boxer, by Ekachai Uekrongtham.
- 2005: Malas temporadas (Hard Times), by Manuel Martín Cuenca.
- 2006: Estrellas de la Línea (The Railroad All-Stars), by Chema Rodríguez.
- 2007: Caramel by Nadine Labaki.
- 2008: Vicky Cristina Barcelona, by Woody Allen.
- 2009: Undertow (Contracorriente), by Javier Fuentes-León.
- 2010: 80 egunean (For 80 Days), by José Mari Goenaga and Jon Garaño.
- 2011: Albert Nobbs, by Rodrigo García.
- 2012: Young & Wild, by Marialy Rivas.
- 2013: Dallas Buyers Club, by Jean-Marc Vallée.
- 2014: The New Girlfriend, by François Ozon.
- 2015: Freeheld, by Peter Sollett.
- 2016: In Between, by Maysaloun Hamoud.
- 2017: BPM (Beats per Minute), by Robin Campillo.
- 2018: Girl, by Lukas Dhont.
- 2019: Monos, by Alejandro Landes.
- 2020: Falling, by Viggo Mortensen.
- 2021: The Power of the Dog, by Jane Campion
- 2022: Something You Said Last Night, by Luis De Filippis
- 2023: 20,000 Species of Bees, by Estibaliz Urresola Solaguren
- 2024: Reas, by Lola Arias
- 2025: Maspalomas, by Jose Mari Goenaga and Aitor Arregi
- 2026: Tangles by Leah Nelson

== Sebastiane Latino ==
In 2013, Sebastiane Latino becomes the second LGBT award given by Gehitu association during the San Sebastián Film Festival. This award tries to promote the LGBT values in the Latin Community. This is born thanks to the close relationship that the San Sebastián Film Festival has with Latin America.

Sebastiane Latino Winners:

- 2013: Quebranto, by Roberto Fiesco (Mexico)
- 2014: Futuro Beach (Praia do Futuro), by Karim Aïnouz (Brazil)
- 2015: Mariposa, by Marco Berger (Argentina)
- 2016: Rara, by Pepa San Martín (Chile)
- 2017: A Fantastic Woman, by Sebastián Lelio (Chile)
- 2018: The Heiresses, by Marcelo Martinessi (Paraguay)
- 2019: Tremors (Temblores), by Jayro Bustamante (Guatemala)
- 2020: One in a Thousand (Las mil y una), by Clarisa Navas (Argentina)
- 2021: Medusa, by Anita Rocha da Silveira (Brazil)
- 2022: Sublime, by Mariano Biasin (Argentina)
- 2023: Transfariana, by Joris Lachaise (France / Colombia)
- 2024: Baby, by Marcelo Caetano (Brazil)

== See also ==
- Golden Shell for Best Film
- Silver Shell for Best Director
- Silver Shell for Best Actress
- Donostia Award
