= 58th Sitges Film Festival =

2025 edition of Spanish film festival

- Official poster
- Opening film: Alpha
- Closing film: The Long Walk
- Location: Sitges, Catalonia, Spain
- Founded: 1968
- Awards: The Kong
- Hosted by: The Foundation Board
- Artistic director: Ángel Sala
- Festival date: Opening: 9 October 2025; Closing: 19 October 2025
- Website: sitgesfilmfestival.com/en

Sitges Film Festival
- 2026 2024

The 58th Sitges International Fantastic Film Festival of Catalonia took place from 9 to 19 October 2025, in Sitges, Catalonia, Spain. It opened on 9 October with Julia Ducournau's body horror drama film Alpha. This edition of the festival honoured American film director, producer, and writer Sean S. Cunningham, the creator of Friday the 13th horror franchise.

Mr. K, a surrealist mystery drama film by Tallulah Hazekamp Schwab was awarded the Méliès d'Or Award for the best European feature film. The winners of the Festival were announced on 18 October 2025. The Ugly Stepsister, a satirical black comedy and body horror film directed by Emilie Blichfeldt, won the award for Best Film, while Park Chan-wook was awarded Best Director for his film No Other Choice.

The festival concluded on 19 October with a tribute to Gale Anne Hurd, who was presented with the WomanInFan Grand Honorary Prize and screening of Francis Lawrence's American dystopian survival thriller film The Long Walk.

== Overview ==
=== Josefina Molina Award ===
The festival with the support of the SGAE Foundation announced 1st Josefina Molina Award for Best Fantastic Feature Film Screenplay by a Woman 2025. The award consists of cash prize of €10,000 and named in honour of Spanish feature film director, screenwriter, TV producer and scene director Josefina Molina.

== Juries ==
The juries consists of the following members:

=== Main competition ===
- Peter Chan, Hong Kong filmmaker
- Mary Harron, Canadian film director and screenwriter
- Laura Pedro, Spanish visual effects supervisor
- Hernan Findling, director, producer
- Jovanka Vuckovic, director, writer

=== Noves Visions ===
- Alison Peirse, Professor of Film at the University of Leeds
- Miguel Llansó, Spanish-born director, writer, lives in Spain, Estonia and Ethiopia
- Santiago Fillol, Argentine film director and screenwriter

=== Blood Window / Òrbita ===
- Carmen Cuba, American casting director
- Darío Lavia, editor, communicator
- Lluís Arcarazo, Catalan film and television writer and screenwriter

=== Méliès d'Argent ===
- Diana Peñalver, Spanish actress
- Marc Mounier, manager and producer at Entertainment 360, based in Los Angeles
- Marcus Stiglegger, Austrian publicist, film scholar, filmmaker and musician

=== Anima't ===
- Alba Sotorra, independent film-director and producer of several documentaries
- Anastasiia Falileieva, Ukrainian director
- José Luis Farias, Spanish creator and director of 3D Wire, the International Market for Animation, Videogames and New Media

=== Brigadoon ===
- Marina Queraltó, film distributor
- Carles Torrens, director, writer
- Xavi Rubí, film fistributor

=== Crítica / Méliès d'Or ===
- Antonio Weinrichter, film critic
- Daniela Urzola, film critic
- Josep Maria Bunyol, film critic

=== SGAE Nova Autoria ===
- Francesc Gener, composer
- Belén Funes, Catalan film director
- Laia Aguilar, screenwriter, writer

=== Carnet Jove ===
- Javier Méndez Cañada
- Lucia Fabó
- Marc Negra
- Martina Rodríguez
- Pepe Rico Piqué

== Official sections ==
The official programme for the 58th edition of the festival is as follows:

=== Secció Oficial Fantàstic a Competició ===
Highlighted title indicates Best Feature Film winner.

English title	Original title	Director(s)	Production country(ies)
Balearic		Ion de Sosa	Spain, France
Bulk		Ben Wheatley	United Kingdom
Chien 51		Cédric Jimenez	France
Death of a Unicorn		Alex Scharfman	United States
Decorado		Alberto Vázquez	Spain, Portugal
Dracula		Radu Jude	Romania, Austria, Luxembourg, Brazil
The Whisper	El susurro	Gustavo Hernández Ibáñez	Uruguay, Argentina
The Thing with Feathers		Dylan Southern	United Kingdom
Exit 8	8番出口	Genki Kawamura	Japan
Eye for an Eye		Colin Tilley	United States
Gaua		Paul Urkijo	Spain
Good Boy		Ben Leonberg	United States
Her Will Be Done	Que ma volonté soit faite	Julia Kowalski	France, Poland
Honey Bunch		Madeleine Sims-Fewer, Dusty Mancinelli	Canada
The Ugly Stepsister	Den Stygge Stesøsteren	Emilie Blichfeldt	Norway, Poland, Sweden, Denmark
The Legend of Ochi		Isaiah Saxon	United States
The Life of Chuck		Mike Flanagan	United States
The Virgin of the Quarry Lake	La virgen de la tosquera	Laura Casabé	Argentina, Mexico, Spain
Mother's Baby		Johanna Moder	Austria, Switzerland, Germany
New Group		Yûta Shimotsu	Japan
No Other Choice	어쩔수가없다	Park Chan-wook	South Korea
Obsession		Curry Barker	United States
Opus		Mark Anthony Green	United States
Redux Redux		Kevin McManus, Matthew McManus	United States
Reflection in a Dead Diamond	Reflet dans un diamant mort	Hélène Cattet, Bruno Forzani	Belgium, Luxembourg, Italy, France
If I Had Legs I'd Kick You		Mary Bronstein	United States
Silence	Silencio	Eduardo Casanova	Spain
Singular		Alberto Gastesi	Spain
The Furious	火遮眼	Kenji Tanigaki	Hong Kong, China
The Plague		Charlie Polinger	United States, Romania
The Evil that Binds Us	Todos los males	Nicolás Postiglione	Chile, Mexico
Together		Michael Shanks	Australia, United States
A Useful Ghost	ผีใช้ได้ค่ะ	Ratchapoom Boonbunchachoke	Thailand, France, Singapore, Germany
We Bury the Dead		Zak Hilditch	Australia, United States

=== Sitges Collection ===
English title	Original title	Director(s)	Production country(ies)
All You Need Is Kill	集英社刊	Kenichiro Akimoto	Japan
Arco		Ugo Bienvenu	United States, France
Black Phone 2		Scott Derrickson	United States
Bugonia		Yorgos Lanthimos	Ireland, South Korea, United States
Dracula		Luc Besson	France
Frankenstein		Guillermo del Toro	United States
Night Patrol		Ryan Prows	United States, United Kingdom
Scarlet	果てしなきスカーレット	Mamoru Hosoda	Japan
Sisu: Road to Revenge	Sisu 2	Jalmari Helander	Finland, United States
Sons of the Neon Night	風林火山	Juno Mak	Hong Kong
The Home		James DeMonaco	United States
The Ice Tower	La Tour de glace	Lucile Hadžihalilović	France, Germany, Italy
The Incredible Shrinking Man	L'Homme qui rétrécit	Jan Kounen	France, Belgium
V/H/S/Halloween		Various directors	United States
Crazy Old Lady	Vieja loca	Martín Mauregui	Spain, Argentina, United States

=== Órbita ===
The following films were selected to be screened as a part of the Órbita section, for films that "stand out for their unique approach and their audience appeal":

English title	Original title	Director(s)	Production countrie(s)
Blazing Fists	Blue Fight 〜蒼き若者たちのブレイキングダウン〜	Takashi Miike	Japan
Cesium Fallout	焚城	Anthony Pun	Hong Kong
Crushed		Simon Rumley	United Kingdom, Thailand
Find Your Friends		Izabel Pakzad	United States, Italy
Luger		Bruno Martín	Spain
No One Will Know	Le Roi Soleil	Vincent Maël Cardona	France
Odyssey		Gerard Johnson	United Kingdom
Sham	捏造：史上最惡殺人教師	Takashi Miike	Japan
She's Got No Name	酱园弄·悬案	Peter Chan	China, Hong Kong
Forbidden City	La città proibita	Gabriele Mainetti	Italy
The Old Woman with the Knife	파과	Min Kyu-dong	South Korea
Tornado		John Maclean	United Kingdom
Trapped	大风杀	Sagara	China
Tristes Tropiques	슬픈 열대	Park Hoon-jung	South Korea
Verano Trippin		Morena Fernández Quinteros	Argentina

=== Shorts ===
The following films were selected to be screened as a part of the Shorts section:

==== Official Fantastic Competition ====
English title	Original title	Director(s)	Production countrie(s)
99 Fantasmas		Gonzalo Torrens	Uruguay
All These Faces Are Starting To Look Bizarrely Familiar		Callum Moore	Australia
Amira		Javier Yáñez	Spain
Animalia		Marius Rolfsvåg	Norway
El Revisor	El Revisor	Jandro	Spain
Em & Selma Go Griffin Hunting		Alex Thompson	United States
Even The Moon Will Bleed	Même La Lune Saignera	Stef Meyer & Rémy Barbe	France, Belgium
Filther		Simen Nyland	Norway
Fumigón	Fumigón	Dani Asensio	Spain
Heirlooms		Dan Abramovici	Canada
Imaginary Friends		Elizabeth Crummett	United States
Jacques The Giant Slayer		Aaron Moorhead & Justin Benson	United States
Las Lágrimas De Sísifo	Las Lágrimas De Sísifo	Luis Larrodera	Spain
Magai-Gami	マガイガミ	Norihiro Niwatsukino	Japan
Magpie		Sylvia Hoeks & Martyna Hoeks	Netherlands
Masks		Andre LeBlanc	Canada
Obsession		Curry Barker	United States
Prou Bé	Prou Bé	Anna Carbonell	Spain
Praying Mantis		Joe Hsieh	Taiwan
Steak Dinner		Nathan Ginter	United States
The Beneath		Lisette Vlassak	Netherlands
The First Hour		Harrison Thomas	United States
The Littles		Andrew Duplessie	United States
The Man That I Wave At		Ben S. Hyland	United Kingdom
The Sleeping Beauty	ນາງງາມນອນຫຼັບ	Mattie Do	Laos
Tongue	혀	Lim Da-seul	South Korea
Väsen	Väsen	Kristofer Kiggs Carlsson	Sweden
Watch Me Burn		Sofia Spotti	Italy
You Are Here		Spencer Lackey	United States
Señuelo	Señuelo	Martha Ayerbe	Colombia

=== Panorama ===
The following films were selected to be screened as a part of the Panorama section, for films previously screened at non-Spanish film festivals:

English title	Original title	Director(s)	Production countrie(s)
Abraham's Boys		Natasha Kermani	United States
13 Days Till Summer	13 dni do wakacji	Bartosz M. Kowalski	Poland
Bagworm		Oliver Bernsen	United States
Blood Shine		Emily Bennett, Justin Brooks	United States
Bokshi		Bhargav Saikia	India
Delivery Run		Joey Palmroos	Finland
Descendent		Peter Cilella	United States
Dollhouse	ドールハウス	Shinobu Yaguchi	Japan
Halabala	ฮาลาบาลา ป่าจิตหลุด	Eakasit Thairaat	Thailand
Hellcat		Brock Bodell	United States
It Ends		Alex Ullom	United States
Love Kills		Luiza Shelling Tubaldini	Brazil
Mag Mag	禍禍女	Yuriyan Retriever	Japan
Man Finds Tape		Paul Gandersman and Peter S. Hall	United States
Marama		Taratoa Stappard	New Zealand
Mermaid		Tyler Cornack	United States
Monster Island	Orang Ikan	Mike Wiluan	Indonesia, Singapore, Japan, United Kingdom
Mother of Flies		John Adams, Zelda Adams and Toby Poser	United States
My Daughter Is a Zombie	좀비딸	Pil Gam-sung	South Korea
No dejes a los niños solos		Emilio Portes	Mexico
Osiris		William Kaufman	United States
Rabbit Trap		Bryn Chainey	United Kingdom, United States
Shelby Oaks		Chris Stuckmann	United States
Slanted		Amy Wang	United States
The Curse		Ken'ichi Ugana	Japan, Taiwan
The Surrender		Julia Max	Canada, United States
The Vile		Majid Al Ansari	United Arab Emirates, United States
Hi Five	하이파이브	Kang Hyeong-cheol	South Korea
Taroman Expo Explosion	大長編 タローマン 万博大爆発	Ryo Fujii	Japan

=== Brigadoon ===
English title	Original title	Director(s)	Production countrie(s)
A World War II Fairy Tale: The Making of Michael Mann's The Keep		Stewart Buck, Stéphane Piter	United Kingdom
African Kung Fu Nazis II – Bum Bum!	アフリカン・カンフー・ナチス2 ブンブン	Sebastian Stein & Samuel "Ninja-Man" Nkansah	Japan
Arcade		Albert Pyun	United States
Baby Blues – Going Dark		James P. Gleason	United States
Bizarrofilia		Ayi Turzi	Argentina
Carlos Cardona, Un Ibicenco En Hollywood		José Luis Mir	Spain
Cemetery of Terror		Rubén Galindo Jr.	Mexico
Death Cycle		Gabriel Carrer	Canada
Devil Curse	猛鬼咒	To Man-Bo	Taiwan, Hong Kong
Devil Returns	驚魂風雨夜	Richard Chen	Hong Kong
Dr. Lazarus		Alejandro Jablonskis, Pedro Loeb	Argentina
Equals		Javier Yáñez	Spain
Floor		Jo Ba-reun	South Korea
Ghosting		Yago Casariego	Spain
Komoriuta	子守唄	Rii Ishihara, Hiroyuki Onogawa	Japan
Nightmare City	Incubo sulla città contaminata	Umberto Lenzi	Italy
La Noche De Romero		Allan J. Arcal	Spain
The Night of the Executioner	La noche del ejecutor	Jacinto Molina	Spain
Listen		Javi Prada	Spain
Las Siete Vidas Del Gato		Pedro Lazaga	Spain
Game of Werewolves	Lobos de Arga	Juan Martínez Moreno	Spain
Los Cántabros		Jacinto Molina	Spain
Masacre En El Río Tula		Ismael Rodríguez Jr.	Mexico
Masters of the Grind		Jason Rutherford	United States
Mighty Boy		Javier Yáñez	Spain
Morbus (O Bon Profit)		Ignasi P. Ferré	Spain
Occupy Cannes		Lily Hayes Kaufman	United States
Paspocalypse		Jasper ten Hoor, Ivan Hidayat	Netherlands
Ratón De Biblioteca		Javier Yáñez	Spain
Rats: Night of Terror	Rats: Notte di terrore	Bruno Mattei	Italy
Speak with the Dead		Stephanie Paris	United States
Street Trash		Jim Muro	United States
Survive!	¡Sobrevive!	René Cardona Jr.	Mexico
Tapestry		Jason Sheedy	United States
TerrorVision		Ted Nicolaou	United States
Test Screening		Clark Baker	United States
The Curious Dr. Humpp	La venganza del sexo	Emilio Vieyra	Argentina
The Devil	魔鬼 (Mo gui)	Chang Jen-Chieh	Taiwan
The Devil's Teardrop		Gonzalo Otero	Uruguay
They Call Her Death		Austin Snell	United States
The Ghost Game	귀신놀이 (Gwisin Nori)	Son Dong-wan	South Korea
Thinestra		Nathan Hertz	United States
Tintorera: Killer Shark	Tintorera	René Cardona Jr.	Mexico
Tragedium		Gastón Haag	Argentina
Tras Las Huellas De Un Gigante. Ray Harryhausen En España	Tras las huellas de un gigante. Ray Harryhausen en España	Luis Esquinas, Domingo Lizcano	Spain
Under Siege	Bajo asedio	René Cardona Jr.	Mexico
Tura!		Cody Jarrett	United States
Two Thousand Maniacs!		Herschell Gordon Lewis	United States

=== Sitges Documenta ===
The following films were selected to be screened as a part of the Sitges Documenta section:

English title	Original title	Director(s)	Production countrie(s)
1000 Women in Horror		Donna Davies	United States
A World War II Fairy Tale: The Making of Michael Mann's The Keep		Stewart Buck, Stéphane Piter	United Kingdom, France
Aquel Último Tiburón		Víctor Matellano, Ángel Sala	Spain
Bizarrofilia		Ayi Turzi	Argentina
Eloy De La Iglesia, Film Addict	Eloy de la Iglesia, adicto al cine	Gaizka Urresti	Spain
Endless Cookie		Peter Scriver, Seth Scriver	Canada
Hammer: Heroes, Legends and Monsters		Benjamin Field	United Kingdom
Horror and Love		Joaquín Oristrell	Spain
Kim Novak's Vertigo		Alexandre O. Philippe	United States
Occupy Cannes		Lily Hayes Kaufman	United States
Sangre Del Toro		Yves Montmayeur	France, United Kingdom
Starman		Robert Stone	United States
Strange Journey: The Story of Rocky Horror		Linus O'Brien	United States
The Python Hunt		Xander Robin	United States
The Vincent Price Legacy		Laurent Ohmansiek	Germany
Theatre of Horrors: The Sordid Story of Paris' Grand Guignol		David Gregory	France
The Degenerate: The Life and Films of Andy Milligan		Grayson Tyler Johnson, Josh Johnson	United States
Tura!		Cody Jarrett	United States
Zodiac Killer Project		Charlie Shackleton	United Kingdom, United States

=== Midnight X-Treme ===
The following films were selected to be screened as a part of the Midnight X-Treme section, for indie and extreme horror films:

English title	Original title	Director(s)	Production countrie(s)
Deathgasm II: Goremageddon		Jason Howden	New Zealand
Deathstalker		Steven Kostanski	Canada, United States
Dolly		Rod Blackhurst	United States
Flush		Grégory Morin	France
Fuck My Son!		Todd Rohal	United States
Hold The Fort		William Bagley	United States
Karmadonna		Aleksandar Radivojevic	Serbia
Meat Kills	Vleesdag	Martijn Smits	Netherlands
Queens of the Dead		Tina Romero	United States
The Book Of Sijjin And Illiyyin	Kitab Sijjin & Illiyyin	Hadrah Daeng Ratu	Indonesia
The Creeps		Marko Mäkilaakso	Finland
Touch Me		Addison Heimann	United States
Ut Lan The Guardian Demon		Dan Trong Tran	Vietnam
Death Red		Mitch Glass	United States

=== Noves Visions ===
English title	Original title	Director(s)	Production country(ies)
About a Hero	Acerca de un héroe	Piotr Winiewicz	Denmark, United States, Germany
Anything That Moves		Alex Phillips	United States
Astrid's Saints		Mariano Baino	Italy
Be A Good Girl		Louiza Zouzias	Canada
Buffet Infinity		Simon Glassman	Canada
Camp		Avalon Fast	Canada
Crocodile Tears		Tumpal Tampubolon	Indonesia
Dead Lover		Grace Glowicki	Canada
Dawning		Patrik Syversen	Norway
A Grand Mockery		Adam C. Briggs, Sam Dixon	Australia
The Last Rapture	El último arrebato	Enrique López Lavigne, Marta Medina	Spain
Every Heavy Thing		Mickey Reece	United States
Feels Like Home	Itt Érzem Magam Otthon	Gábor Holtai	Hungary
Forte		Kimbo Kim	South Korea
Fucktoys		Annapurna Sriram	United States
Lucid		Ramsey Fendall, Deanna Milligan	Canada
Obex		Albert Birney	United States
Roqia		Yanis Koussim	Algeria, France
Tengosei～Shaman Star	天號星 (Tengosei)	Hidenori Inoue	Japan
The Fin		Syeyoung Park	South Korea, Germany, Qatar
The Holy Boy	La Valle Dei Sorrisi	Paolo Strippoli	Italy, Slovenia
The Home	Hemmet	Mattias J. Skoglund	Sweden
The Infinite Husk		Aaron Silverstein	United States
The Things You Kill		Alireza Khatami	Turkey, France, Poland, Canada
The True Beauty Of Being Bitten By A Tick		Pete Ohs	United States
Transcending Dimensions	次元を超える	Toshiaki Toyoda	Japan

=== Anima't ===
The following films were selected to be screened as a part of the Anima't section, for animated films:

English title	Original title	Director(s)	Production countrie(s)
All You Need Is Kill	集英社刊	Kenichiro Akimoto	Japan
Arco		Ugo Bienvenu	United States, France
Another World	世外	Tommy Kai Chung Ng	Hong Kong
ChaO		Yasuhiro Aoki	Japan
Decorado		Alberto Vázquez	Spain, Portugal
Dog of God	Dieva Suns	Lauris Abele & Raitis Abele	Latvia, United States
Endless Cookie		Peter Scriver, Seth Scriver	Canada
Lesbian Space Princess		Emma Hough Hobbs, Leela Varghese	Australia
Memory Hotel		Heinrich Sabl	Germany, France
Nightmare Bugs		Osamu Fukutani, Saku Sakamoto	Japan
I Am Frankelda	Soy Frankelda	Arturo and Roy Ambriz	Mexico
Tamala 2030: A Punk Cat In Dark		t.o.L.	Japan
The Girl Who Stole Time	时间之子	Ao Yu & Zhou Tienan	China
The Square		Kim Bo-sol	South Korea
The Quinta's Ghost	El Fantasma de la Quinta	James A. Castillo	Spain

=== Special Screenings ===
The following films were selected to be screened as a part of the Anima't section, for animated films:

English title	Original title	Director(s)	Production countrie(s)
Brick Boy		Scott Vasey	United States
Chupacabras		Jordi Serrallonga	Spain
Wisteria		Ian Garrucho	Spain

== Awards ==
The main awards of the 58th edition of the SITGES were announced on 18 October 2025.

=== SOFC jury prizes ===
The following awards were conceded:

- Best Film: The Ugly Stepsister
  - Special Jury Prize: The Furious and Obsession
- Best Director: Park Chan-wook (No Other Choice)
- Best Actress: Rose Byrne (If I Had Legs I'd Kick You)
- Best Actor: the cast of The Plague
- Best Screenplay: Ratchapoom Boonbunchachoke (A Useful Ghost)
- Best Cinematography: Diego Tenorio (The Virgin of the Quarry Lake)
- Best Music: Yasutaka Nakata and Shohei Amimori (Exit 8)
- Best Special Effects: Tenille Shockey and François Dagenais (Honey Bunch)

=== Noves Visions ===
- Best feature film: (ex aequo for)
  - Lesbian Space Princess (by Emma Hough Hobbs and Leela Varghese)
  - The True Beauty Of Being Bitten By A Tick (by Pete Ohs)
- Best Director:
  - A Grand Mockery (Adam C. Briggs and Sam Dixon)
  - Transcending Dimensions (Toshiaki Toyoda)
- Best Short Film: Monstruo Obscura, by Hong Seung-gi

=== Òrbita and Blood Window ===
- Best Film Blood Window: Don't Leave the Children Alone by Emilio Portes
- Best Orbit Film: The Forbidden City by Gabriele Mainetti

=== Méliès d'Or ===
- Méliès d'Or Award for the best European feature film: Mr. K by Tallulah Hazekamp Schwab
- Méliès d'Or Award for the best European short film: Don't Be Afraid by Mats Udd

=== Méliès d'Argent ===
- Méliès d'Argent Award for the Best Film: Feels Like Home by Gábor Holtai
- Méliès d'Argent Award for the Best Short Film: The Quinta's Ghost by James A. Castillo

=== Anima't ===
- Best Animated Feature Film: Lesbian Space Princess by Emma Hough Hobbs and Leela Varghese
- Best Animated Short Film: Luz diabla by Gervasio Canda, Paula Boffo and Patricio Plaza

=== Brigadoon ===
- Brigadoon Paul Naschy Award for Best Short Film: Floor by Jo Ba-reun

=== Critic's Jury ===
- José Luis Guarner Critics' Award for Best Film in the SOFC:
  - Life of Chuck by Mike Flanagan
  - Reflection in a Dead Diamond by Hélène Cattet, Bruno Forzani
- Citizen Kane Award for Best New Director: Ratchapoom Boonbunchachoke for A Useful Ghost
- Best Short Film in the SOFC: The Man That I Wave At by Ben S. Hyland

=== SGAE Nova Autoria ===
- Best Direction: Fran Moreno Blanco and Santi Pujol for Furia
- Best Screenplay: Fran Moreno Blanco and Santi Pujol for Furia
- Best Original Music: Sergio Rojas for Matcha

=== People' Choice Award ===
- SOFC Audience Award: Obsession by Curry Barker
- Best Feature Film in the Panorama Section: Bagworm by Henry Bernsen
- Best Feature Film in the Midnight X-Treme Section: Flush by Grégory Morin
- Best Feature Film in the Sitges Collection Section: Arco by Ugo Bienvenu
- Best Feature Film in Focus Asia: Hi-Five by Kang Hyeong-cheol

=== Carnet Jove (Youth Card) ===
- Best Film in the Official Competition: Obsession by Curry Barker
- Best Film Sitges Documentary: Endless Cookie, by Peter Scriver and Seth Scriver

=== Special awards ===
The following are recipients of special honours:

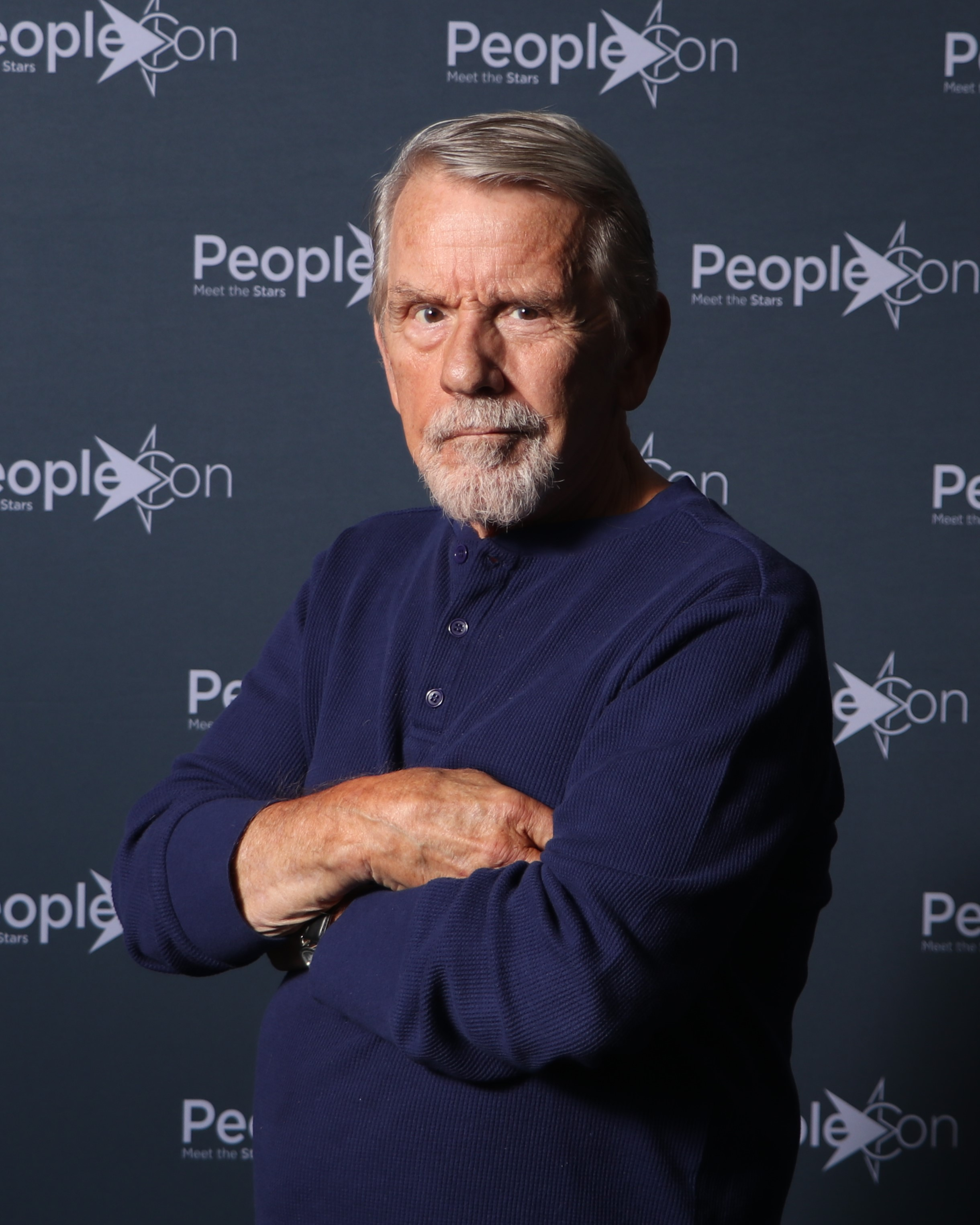
Sean S. Cunningham, recipient of the Time Machine Award

- Time Machine Award:
  - Sean S. Cunningham, American film director, producer, and writer, the creator of Friday the 13th horror franchise.
  - Ben Wheatley, English filmmaker, film editor, and animator
  - Benedict Cumberbatch, English actor
  - Enzo G. Castellari, Italian film director, screenwriter and actor
  - William Fichtner, American actor
- Grand Honorary Awards:
  - Peter Chan, Hong Kong-born filmmaker.
  - Carmen Maura, Spanish actress
  - Terry Gilliam, American-British filmmaker, comedian, collage animator
  - Joe Dante, American film director
- WomanInFan Grand Honorary Award:

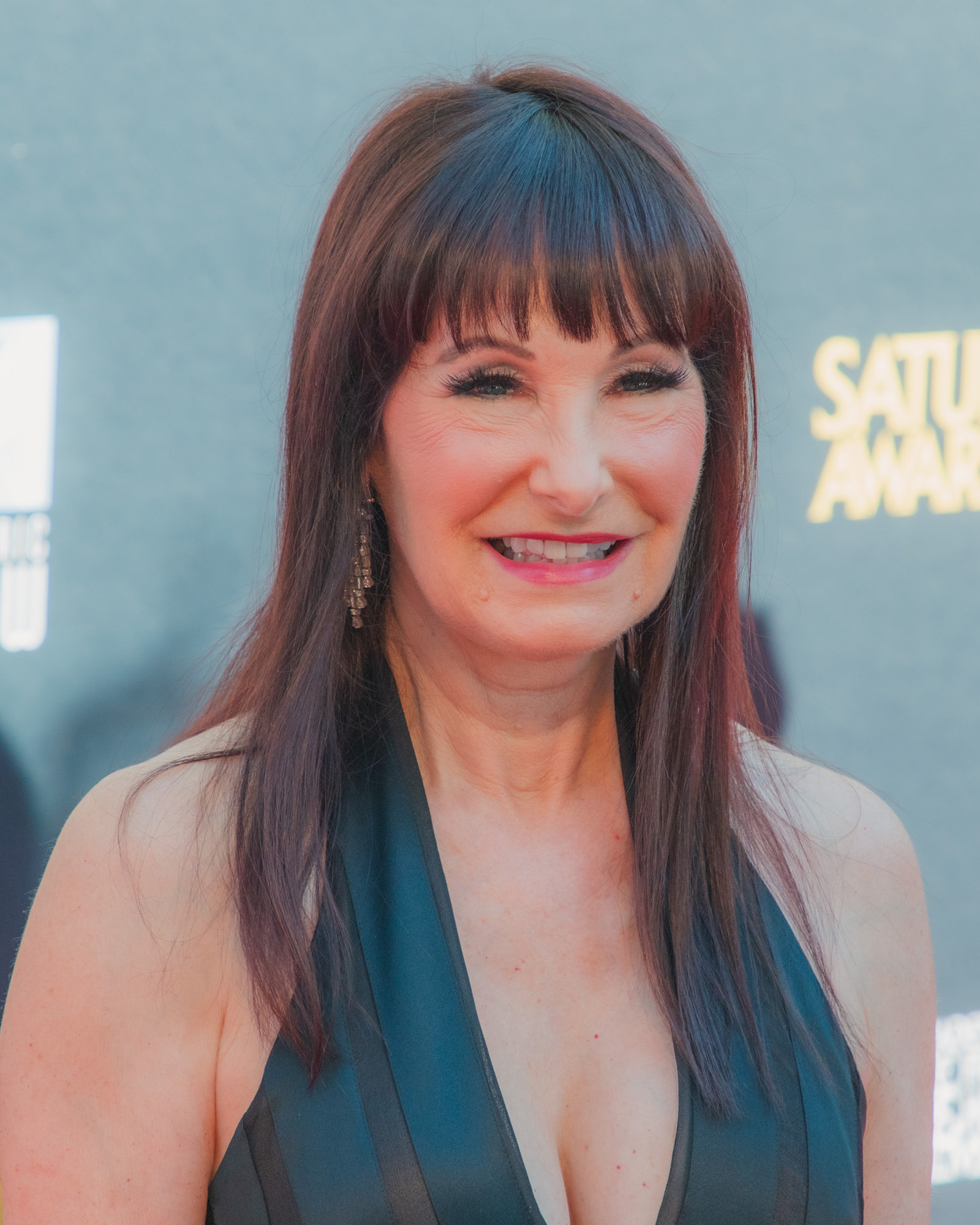
Gale Anne Hurd, recipient of the WomanInFan Grand Honorary Award

  - Gale Anne Hurd, American film and television producer, the founder of Valhalla Entertainment
- WomanInFan Award:

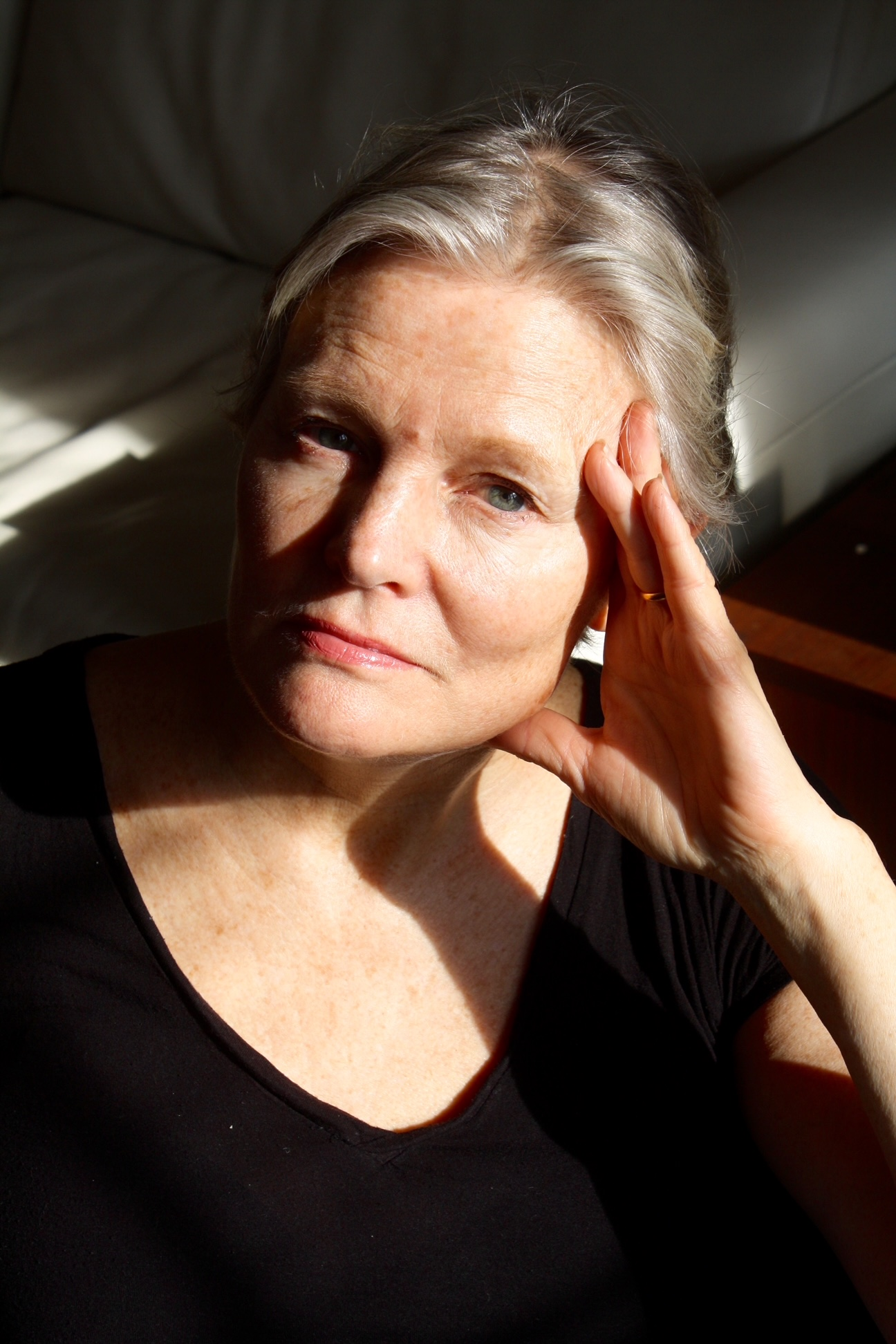
Mary Harron, recipient of the WomanInFan Award

  - Mary Harron, Canadian film director and screenwriter
  - Nancy Loomis, American actress
- Nosferatu Award:
  - Hugo Stiglitz, Mexican actor
- Méliès Career Award:
  - Dominique Pinon, French actor
