= Jason Ryle =

Canadian film producer

Jason Ryle is a Canadian film producer and festival programmer, most noted for his longtime role as head of the imagineNATIVE Film and Media Arts Festival.

An Anishinaabe member of the Lake St. Martin First Nation in Manitoba, he first joined the festival's board of directors in 2004, becoming executive director in 2010. During his time with imagineNATIVE, he also served as an advisor on indigenous film to the Berlin Film Festival, and as coordinator of indigenous film programs at the European Film Market.

After announcing his departure from imagineNATIVE in 2020, he was named the recipient of the Clyde Gilmour Award at the Toronto Film Critics Association Awards 2020. He subsequently joined the programming team for the Toronto International Film Festival in 2022, and is currently programmer for films from the United Kingdom, Ireland, Australia, New Zealand and global indigenous cinema.

He has also had a number of credits as a film producer, most notably on the 2025 animated documentary film Endless Cookie.

== Filmography ==
- Snip - 2016, producer
- Keewaydah (Let's Go Home) - 2017, producer
- Meneath: The Hidden Island of Ethics - 2021, consulting producer
- Stellar - 2022, associate producer
- Amplify - 2023-24, television series producer
- Singing Back the Buffalo - 2024, producer
- Endless Cookie - 2025, producer
- Wilfred Buck's Star Stories - 2025, producer
- Aki - 2025, executive producer
- Shaaghan Neekwaii (Two Old Women) - 2025, producer

== Awards ==
Award	Date of ceremony	Category	Work	Result	Ref.
Canadian Screen Awards	2026	Best Feature Length Documentary	Endless Cookie with Seth Scriver, Peter Scriver, Daniel Bekerman, Alex Ordanis, Chris Yurkovich, Neil Mathieson	Won	
Film Independent Spirit Awards	2026	Best Documentary Feature	Endless Cookie with Seth Scriver, Peter Scriver, Daniel Bekerman, Alex Ordanis, Chris Yurkovich, Neil Mathieson	Nominated	
Toronto Film Critics Association	2020	Clyde Gilmour Award		Won	
