= Independent Spirit Award for Best Documentary Feature =

Annual US film award

- Presented by: Independent Spirit Awards
- First award: Dark Days (2000)
- Currently held by: The Perfect Neighbor (2025)
- Website: spiritawards.com

The Independent Spirit Award for Best Documentary Feature is one of the annual Independent Spirit Awards. It is given to the director(s) of the film and since 2014 it is also given to the producers. It was first presented in 2000, with Marc Singer's Dark Days being the first recipient of the award.

== Winners and nominees ==
=== 2000s ===
| Year | Film | Distributing company(s) | Director(s) |
|---|---|---|---|
| 2000 | Dark Days | Palm Pictures | Marc Singer |
| 2000 | The Eyes of Tammy Faye | Lionsgate Films | Fenton Bailey and Randy Barbato |
| 2000 | Long Night's Journey into Day | Seventh Art Releasing | Deborah Hoffmann and Frances Reid |
| 2000 | Paragraph 175 | New Yorker Films | Rob Epstein and Jeffrey Friedman |
| 2000 | Sound and Fury | Artistic License Films | Josh Aronson |
| 2001 | Dogtown and Z-Boys | Sony Pictures Classics | Stacy Peralta |
| 2001 | Go Tigers! | IFC Films | Kenneth A. Carlson |
| 2001 | LaLee's Kin: The Legacy of Cotton | Maysles Films Inc. | Deborah Dickson, Susan Froemke and Albert Maysles |
| 2001 | Promises | Cowboy Pictures | Carlos Bolado, B.Z. Goldberg, and Justine Shapiro |
| 2001 | Scratch | Palm Pictures | Doug Pray |
| 2002 | Bowling for Columbine | United Artists | Michael Moore |
| 2002 | The Cockettes | Strand Releasing | Bill Weber and David Weissman |
| 2002 | Devil's Playground | Cinemax | Lucy Walker |
| 2002 | How to Draw a Bunny | Artisan Entertainment | John W. Walter |
| 2002 | Stevie | Kartemquin Films | Steve James |
| 2003 | The Fog of War | Sony Pictures Classics | Errol Morris |
| 2003 | Mayor of the Sunset Strip | First Look Studios | George Hickenlooper |
| 2003 | My Architect | New Yorker Films | Nathaniel Kahn |
| 2003 | OT: Our Town | Film Movement | Scott Hamilton Kennedy |
| 2003 | Power Trip | Films Transit International | Paul Devlin |
| 2004 | Metallica: Some Kind of Monster | IFC Films | Joe Berlinger and Bruce Sinofsky |
| 2004 | Bright Leaves | First Run Features | Ross McElwee |
| 2004 | Chisholm '72: Unbought & Unbossed | 20th Century Fox Home Entertainment | Shola Lynch |
| 2004 | Hiding and Seeking: Faith and Tolerance After the Holocaust | First Run Features | Menachem Daum and Oren Rudavsky |
| 2004 | Tarnation | Wellspring Media | Jonathan Caouette |
| 2005 | Enron: The Smartest Guys in the Room | Magnolia Pictures | Alex Gibney |
| 2005 | Grizzly Man | Lionsgate Films | Werner Herzog |
| 2005 | La Sierra | Icarus Films | Scott Dalton and Margarita Martinez |
| 2005 | Romántico | Kino International | Mark Becker |
| 2005 | Sir! No Sir! | Balcony Releasing | David Zeiger |
| 2006 | The Road to Guantánamo | Roadside Attractions | Michael Winterbottom |
| 2006 | A Lion in the House | PBS Distribution | Steven Bognar and Julia Reichert |
| 2006 | My Country, My Country | Zeitgeist Films | Laura Poitras |
| 2006 | The Trials of Darryl Hunt | THINKFilm | Ricki Stern and Anne Sundberg |
| 2006 | You're Gonna Miss Me | Palm Pictures | Keven McAlester |
| 2007 | Crazy Love | Magnolia Pictures | Dan Klores and Fisher Stevens |
| 2007 | Lake of Fire | THINKFilm | Tony Kaye |
| 2007 | Manufactured Landscapes | Zeitgeist Films | Jennifer Baichwal |
| 2007 | The Monastery | Koch-Lorber Films | Pernille Rose Grønkjær |
| 2007 | The Prisoner or: How I Planned to Kill Tony Blair | Truly Indie | Michael Tucker and Petra Epperlein |
| 2008 | Man on Wire | Magnolia Pictures | James Marsh |
| 2008 | The Betrayal | The Cinema Guild | Ellen Kuras and Thavisouk Phrasavath |
| 2008 | Encounters at the End of the World | THINKFilm | Werner Herzog |
| 2008 | The Order of Myths | The Cinema Guild | Margaret Brown |
| 2008 | Up the Yangtze | Zeitgeist Films | Yung Chang |
| 2009 | Anvil! The Story of Anvil | Abramorama | Sacha Gervasi |
| 2009 | Food, Inc. | Magnolia Pictures | Robert Kenner |
| 2009 | More than a Game | Lionsgate | Kristopher Belman |
| 2009 | October Country | Topic Studios | Michael Palmieri and Donal Mosher |
| 2009 | Which Way Home | HBO Films | Rebecca Cammisa |

=== 2010s ===
| Year | Film | Director(s) | Producer(s) |
|---|---|---|---|
| 2010 | Exit Through the Gift Shop | Banksy | |
| 2010 | Marwencol | Jeff Malmberg | |
| 2010 | Restrepo | Tim Hetherington and Sebastian Junger | |
| 2010 | Sweetgrass | Lucien Castaing-Taylor | |
| 2010 | Thunder Soul | Mark Landsman | |
| 2011 | The Interrupters | Steve James | Steve James, Alex Kotlowitz |
| 2011 | An African Election | Jarreth J. Merz and Kevin Merz | Jarreth J. Merz |
| 2011 | Bill Cunningham New York | Richard Press | Philip Gefter |
| 2011 | The Redemption of General Butt Naked | Daniele Anastasion and Eric Strauss | |
| 2011 | We Were Here | David Weissman | |
| 2012 | The Invisible War | Kirby Dick | |
| 2012 | The Central Park Five | Ken Burns, Sarah Burns, and David McMahon | |
| 2012 | How to Survive a Plague | David France | |
| 2012 | Marina Abramović: The Artist is Present | Matthew Akers and Jeff Dupre | |
| 2012 | The Waiting Room | Peter Nicks | |
| 2013 | 20 Feet from Stardom | Morgan Neville | Gil Friesen, Morgan Neville, Caitrin Rogers |
| 2013 | The Act of Killing | Joshua Oppenheimer and Christine Cynn | Joshua Oppenheimer, Joram Ten Brink, Christine Cynn, Anne Köhncke, Signe Byrge Sørensen, Michael Uwemedimo, Anonymous |
| 2013 | After Tiller | Martha Shane and Lana Wilson | |
| 2013 | Gideon's Army | Dawn Porter | Dawn Porter, Julie Goldman |
| 2013 | The Square | Jehane Noujaim | Karim Amer |
| 2014 | Citizenfour | Laura Poitras | Laura Poitras, Mathilde Bonnefoy, Dirk Wilutzky |
| 2014 | 20,000 Days on Earth | Iain Forsyth and Jane Pollard | Dan Bowen, James Wilson |
| 2014 | The Salt of the Earth | Wim Wenders and Juliano Ribeiro Salgado | David Rosier |
| 2014 | Stray Dog | Debra Granik | Anne Rosellini |
| 2014 | Virunga | Orlando von Einsiedel | Orlando von Einsiedel, Joanna Natasegara |
| 2015 | The Look of Silence | Joshua Oppenheimer | Signe Byrge Sørensen |
| 2015 | (T)error | Lyric R. Cabral and David Felix Sutcliffe | |
| 2015 | Best of Enemies | Robert Gordon and Morgan Neville | |
| 2015 | Heart of a Dog | Laurie Anderson | Laurie Anderson, Dan Janvey |
| 2015 | Meru | Jimmy Chin and Elizabeth Chai Vasarhelyi | |
| 2015 | The Russian Woodpecker | Chad Garcia | Mike Lerner, Ram Devineni, Chad Gracia |
| 2016 | O.J.: Made in America | Ezra Edelman | Ezra Edelman, Deirdre Fenton, Libby Geist, Nina Krstic, Erin Leyden, Tamara Rosenberg, Connor Schell, Caroline Waterlow |
| 2016 | 13th | Ava DuVernay | Howard Barish, Ava DuVernay, Spencer Averick |
| 2016 | Cameraperson | Kirsten Johnson | Kirsten Johnson, Marilyn Ness |
| 2016 | I Am Not Your Negro | Raoul Peck | Raoul Peck, Rémi Grellety, Hébert Peck |
| 2016 | Sonita | Rokhsareh Ghaemmaghami | Gerd Haag |
| 2016 | Under the Sun | Vitaly Mansky | Natalya Manskaya |
| 2017 | Faces Places | Agnès Varda and JR | Rosalie Varda |
| 2017 | The Departure | Lana Wilson | |
| 2017 | Last Men in Aleppo | Feras Fayyad | Kareem Abeed, Søren Steen Jespersen, Stefan Kloos |
| 2017 | Motherland | Ramona Diaz | Rey Cuerdo |
| 2017 | Quest | Jonathan Olshefski | Sabrina Schmidt Gordon |
| 2018 | Won't You Be My Neighbor? | Morgan Neville | Morgan Neville, Caryn Capotosto, Nicholas Ma |
| 2018 | Hale County This Morning, This Evening | RaMell Ross | RaMell Ross, Joslyn Barnes, Su Kim |
| 2018 | Minding the Gap | Bing Liu | Bing Liu, Diane Moy Quon |
| 2018 | Of Fathers and Sons | Talal Derki | Hans Robert Eisenhauer, Ansgar Frerich, Eva Kemme, Tobias N. Siebert |
| 2018 | On Her Shoulders | Alexandria Bombach | Hayley Pappas, Brock Williams |
| 2018 | Shirkers | Sandi Tan | Sandi Tan, Jessica Levin, Maya E. Rudolph |
| 2019 | American Factory | Steven Bognar, Julia Reichert | Steven Bognar, Julia Reichert, Jeff Reichert, Julie Parker Benello |
| 2019 | Apollo 11 | Todd Douglas Miller | Todd Douglas Miller, Thomas Petersen and Evan Krauss |
| 2019 | For Sama | Waad Al-Kateab, Edward Watts | Waad Al-Kateab |
| 2019 | Honeyland | Tamara Kotevska, Ljubomir Stefanov | Tamara Kotevska, Ljubomir Stefanov, Atanas Georgiev |
| 2019 | Island of the Hungry Ghosts | Gabrielle Brady | Alexander Wadouh, Samm Haillay, Alex Kelly, Gizem Acarla and Gabrielle Brady |

=== 2020s ===
| Year | Film | Director(s) | Producer(s) |
|---|---|---|---|
| 2020 | Crip Camp | Nicole Newnham and James LeBrecht | Nicole Newnham, James Lebrecht, Sara Bolder |
| 2020 | Collective | Alexander Nanau | Alexander Nanau, Hanka Kastelicová, Bernard Michaux, Bianca Oana |
| 2020 | Dick Johnson Is Dead | Kirsten Johnson | Kirsten Johnson, Katy Chevigny, Marilyn Ness |
| 2020 | The Mole Agent | Maite Alberdi | Marcela Santibáñez |
| 2020 | Time | Garrett Bradley | Garrett Bradley, Lauren Domino, Kellen Quinn |
| 2021 | Summer of Soul (...Or, When the Revolution Could Not Be Televised) | Ahmir "Questlove" Thompson | David Dinerstein, Robert Fyvolent, Joseph Patel |
| 2021 | Ascension | Jessica Kingdon | Jessica Kingdon, Kira Simon-Kennedy, Nathan Truesdell |
| 2021 | Flee | Jonas Poher Rasmussen | Monica Hellström, Signe Byrge Sørensen |
| 2021 | In the Same Breath | Nanfu Wang | Nanfu Wang, Christopher Clements, Julie Goldman, Carolyn Hepburn, Jialing Zhang |
| 2021 | Procession | Robert Greene | Susan Bedusa, Bennett Elliott, Douglas Tirola |
| 2022 | All the Beauty and the Bloodshed | Laura Poitras | Laura Poitras, Howard Gertler, Nan Goldin, Yoni Golijov, John Lyons |
| 2022 | All That Breathes | Shaunak Sen | Shaunak Sen, Teddy Leifer, Aman Mann |
| 2022 | A House Made of Splinters | Simon Lereng Wilmont | Monica Hellström |
| 2022 | Midwives | Snow Hnin Ei Hlaing | Snow Hnin Ei Hlaing, Mila Aung-Thwin, Ulla Lehmann, Bob Moore |
| 2022 | Riotsville, U.S.A. | Sierra Pettengill | Sierra Pettengill, Sara Archambault, Jamila Wignot |
| 2023 | Four Daughters | Kaouther Ben Hania | Nadim Cheikhrouha |
| 2023 | Bye Bye Tiberias | Lina Soualem | Jean-Marie Nizan |
| 2023 | Going to Mars: The Nikki Giovanni Project | Joe Brewster and Michèle Stephenson | Tommy Oliver |
| 2023 | Kokomo City | D. Smith | Bill Butler and Harris Doran |
| 2023 | The Mother of All Lies | Asmae El Moudir | Asmae El Moudir |
| 2024 | No Other Land | Basel Adra, Hamdan Ballal, Yuval Abraham, and Rachel Szor | Fabien Greenberg, Bård Kjøge Rønning |
| 2024 | Gaucho Gaucho | Michael Dweck and Gregory Kershaw | Michael Dweck, Gregory Kershaw, Christos V. Konstantakopoulos, Cameron O'Reilly, Matthew Perniciaro |
| 2024 | Hummingbirds | Silvia Del Carmen Castaños and Estefanía "Beba" Contreras | Leslie Benavides, Miguel-Drake McLaughlin, Rivkah Beth Meadow, Diane Ng, Ana Rodriguez-Falcó, Jillian Schlesinger |
| 2024 | Patrice: The Movie | Ted Passon | Kyla Harris, Innbo Shim, Emily Spivack |
| 2024 | Soundtrack to a Coup d'Etat | Johan Grimonprez | Rémi Grellety, Daan Milius |
| 2025 | The Perfect Neighbor | Geeta Gandbhir | Geeta Gandbhir, Sam Bisbee, Nikon Kwantu, Alisa Payne |
| 2025 | Come See Me in the Good Light | Ryan White | Ryan White, Jessica Hargrave, Tig Notaro, Stef Willen |
| 2025 | Endless Cookie | Seth Scriver and Peter Scriver | Seth Scriver, Daniel Bekerman, Alex Ordanis, Jason Ryle, Chris Yurkovich |
| 2025 | My Undesirable Friends: Part I — Last Air in Moscow | Julia Loktev | Julia Loktev |
| 2025 | The Tale of Silyan | Tamara Kotevska | Tamara Kotevska, Jean Dakar, Anna Hashmi, Jordanco Petkovski |

== See also ==
- Academy Award for Best Documentary Feature
- BAFTA Award for Best Documentary
- Critics' Choice Documentary Awards
- Gotham Award for Best Documentary
- National Board of Review Award for Best Documentary Film
