= Seth Scriver =

Canadian animated film director

Seth Scriver is a Canadian animated film director and illustrator. He is most noted as co-director with Shayne Ehman of the 2013 film Asphalt Watches, which won the award for Best Canadian First Feature Film at the 2013 Toronto International Film Festival.

As a comics artist, he has been a two-time Doug Wright Award nominee, receiving nods in 2011 for Stooge Pile and in 2014 for Flexible Tube with Stink Lines.

His second film, Endless Cookie, premiered at the 2025 Sundance Film Festival. The film was codirected with his half-brother, Peter Scriver.

== Awards ==
Award / Film Festival	Date of ceremony	Category	Work	Result	Ref.
Annecy International Animation Film Festival	June 14, 2025	Contrechamp – Best Feature Film	Endless Cookie with Peter Scriver	Won	
Thessaloniki Documentary Festival	March 16, 2025	Film Forward – the Golden Alexander	Endless Cookie with Peter Scriver	Won	
Hot Docs Canadian International Documentary Festival	May 4, 2025	Rogers Audience Award	Endless Cookie with Peter Scriver	Won	
Director's Guild of Canada	November 8, 2025	Jean-Marc Vallée DGC Discovery Award	Endless Cookie with Peter Scriver	Longlisted	
Director's Guild of Canada	November 8, 2025	DGC Allan King Award for Best Documentary Film	Endless Cookie with Peter Scriver	Nominated	
Boston Society of Film Critics	December 14, 2025	Best Animated Film	Endless Cookie with Peter Scriver	Won	
Film Independent Spirit Awards	February 15, 2026	Best Documentary Feature	Endless Cookie with Peter Scriver, Daniel Bekerman, Alex Ordanis, Jason Ryle, Chris Yurkovich	Nominated	
Toronto Film Critics Association	March 2, 2026	Rogers Best Canadian Documentary	Endless Cookie with Peter Scriver	Won	
Toronto Film Critics Association	March 2, 2026	Best Animated Film	Endless Cookie with Peter Scriver	Won	
Toronto International Film Festival	2013	Best Canadian First Feature Film	Asphalt Watches	Won	
Anifilm	May 10, 2026	Endless Cookie with Peter Scriver	Best Feature Film for Adults	Won	
Canadian Screen Awards	May 31, 2026	Best Feature Length Documentary	Endless Cookie with Peter Scriver, Daniel Bekerman, Alex Ordanis, Chris Yurkovich, Jason Ryle, Neil Mathieson	Won	
