= State Like Sleep =

- Theatrical release poster
- Directed by: Meredith Danluck
- Written by: Meredith Danluck
- Produced by: Daniel Bekerman; Jessica Cheung; P. Jennifer Dana; Ross Jacobson; Ethan Lazar; Julia Lebedev; Angel Lopez; Mark Roberts; Eddie Vaisman
- Starring: Katherine Waterston; Michael Shannon; Luke Evans; Michiel Huisman
- Cinematography: Christopher Blauvelt
- Edited by: Curtiss Clayton
- Music by: David Wingo; Jeff McIlwain
- Production companies: Code Red Productions; Scythia Films
- Distributed by: The Orchard
- Release dates: April 21, 2018 (Tribeca); January 4, 2019 (United States)
- Running time: 104 minutes
- Country: United States
- Language: English

State Like Sleep is a 2018 American drama film written and directed by Meredith Danluck in her feature directorial debut. It stars Katherine Waterston, Michael Shannon, Luke Evans, and Michiel Huisman. It premiered at the 2018 Tribeca Film Festival, and was released on January 4, 2019, by The Orchard.

== Premise ==
The film is centered on an owner and operator behind the club "Lebellfleur" – a secret high class gentleman's club that a woman thinks keeps the answers to her husband's death.

== Cast ==
- Katherine Waterston as Katherine Grand
- Michael Shannon as Edward
- Luke Evans as Emile
- Michiel Huisman as Stefan Delvoe
- Mary Kay Place as Elaine Grand
- Julie Khaner as Anneke Delvoe
- Mark O'Brien as Darren
- Bo Martyn as Frieda
- Carlo Rota as Dr. Iyengar
- Jean-Michel Le Gal as Cop #2

== Filming ==
Filming took place in Toronto and Cambridge, Ontario in mid-2016.

== Release ==
The film had its world premiere at the Tribeca Film Festival on April 21, 2018. Shortly after, The Orchard acquired distribution rights to the film. It was released on January 4, 2019.

=== Critical reception ===
On review aggregate website Rotten Tomatoes, State Like Sleep has an approval rating of 37% based on 30 reviews. The site’s critics consensus reads, "State Like Sleep fails to engage despite the efforts of a talented cast, leaving viewers with a would-be thriller that has an unfortunately descriptive title."
