= List of Warner Bros. films (2020–2029) =

Logo used since 2023

The following is a list of films produced, co-produced, and/or distributed by Warner Bros. Pictures in 2020–2029. The list does not include Japanese films distributed by Warner Bros. Pictures Japan or distribution of non-US local films in only one or few markets.

- A † signifies a PVOD release.
- A ‡ signifies a direct-to-video release or streaming release exclusively through HBO Max.
- A § signifies a simultaneous release to theaters and on HBO Max.
- A * signifies a streaming release through a third-party streaming service.

== 2020 ==
Release date	Title	Notes
February 7, 2020	Birds of Prey	co-production with DC Films, LuckyChap Entertainment, Kroll & Co. Entertainment, and Clubhouse Pictures (Note: Theatrically released on February 7, 2020, and later released on Premium VOD on March 24, 2020, in response to the closure of theaters across the globe impacted by the COVID-19 pandemic.)
March 6, 2020	The Way Back	co-production with Bron Creative, Mayhem Pictures, Jennifer Todd Pictures, and Film Tribe (Note: Theatrically released on March 6, 2020, but was later released on Premium VOD on March 24, 2020, in response to the closure of theaters across the globe impacted by the Coronavirus pandemic.)
May 15, 2020	Scoob! †	co-production with Warner Animation Group (Note: Originally planned for a worldwide theatrical release on May 15, 2020, was released on Premium VOD in the United States and Canada on this date in response to the closure of theaters across the globe impacted by the Coronavirus pandemic. To make up for its intended worldwide theatrical release, it was later theatrically released in select countries with relaxed Coronavirus restrictions as of July 8, 2020.)
August 6, 2020	An American Pickle ‡	A Warner Max film; produced by Point Grey Pictures and Sony Pictures; distributed by HBO Max
September 3, 2020	Tenet	co-production with Syncopy (Note: Released in the United Kingdom and Canada on August 26, 2020.)
September 10, 2020	Unpregnant ‡	A Warner Max film; produced by Berlanti Productions and Picturestart; distributed by HBO Max
October 8, 2020	Charm City Kings ‡	A Warner Max film; produced by Overbrook Entertainment; distributed by HBO Max
October 22, 2020	The Witches ‡	co-production with Esperanto Filmoj, ImageMovers, and Necropia Entertainment; distributed by HBO Max in the United States
November 26, 2020	Superintelligence ‡	A Warner Max film; produced by New Line Cinema, Bron Creative, and On the Day Productions; distributed by HBO Max
December 10, 2020	Let Them All Talk ‡	A Warner Max film; produced by Extension 765; distributed by HBO Max
December 25, 2020	Wonder Woman 1984 §	co-production with DC Films, The Stone Quarry and Atlas Entertainment (Note: Released in international theaters on December 16, 2020.)

== 2021 ==
Release date	Title	Notes
January 14, 2021	Locked Down ‡	distribution only; produced by AGC Studios and Storyteller Productions; co-distributed with HBO Max
January 29, 2021	The Little Things §	co-production with Gran Via Productions
February 12, 2021	Judas and the Black Messiah §	co-production with MACRO, Bron Creative and Participant
February 26, 2021	Tom & Jerry §	co-production with Warner Animation Group
March 18, 2021	Zack Snyder's Justice League ‡	co-production with DC Films, Atlas Entertainment and The Stone Quarry; distributed by HBO Max
March 31, 2021	Godzilla vs. Kong §	distribution outside Japan and China only; produced by Legendary Pictures, Toho and Disruption Entertainment
April 23, 2021	Mortal Kombat §	co-production with New Line Cinema, Atomic Monster and Broken Road Productions
May 14, 2021	Those Who Wish Me Dead §	co-production with New Line Cinema and Bron Studios
June 4, 2021	The Conjuring: The Devil Made Me Do It §	co-production with New Line Cinema, Atomic Monster and The Safran Company
June 11, 2021	In the Heights §	co-production with 5000 Broadway Productions, Barrio Grrrl! Productions, Likely Story, SGS Pictures and Endeavor Content
July 1, 2021	No Sudden Move ‡	distributed by HBO Max
July 16, 2021	Space Jam: A New Legacy §	co-production with Warner Animation Group, Proximity Media, and SpringHill Company
August 6, 2021	The Suicide Squad §	co-production with DC Films, Atlas Entertainment and The Safran Company
August 20, 2021	Reminiscence §	co-production with FilmNation Entertainment, Kilter Films and Michael De Luca Productions
September 10, 2021	Malignant §	distribution outside China only; produced by New Line Cinema, Starlight Media and Atomic Monster
September 17, 2021	Cry Macho §	co-production with Malpaso Productions
October 1, 2021	The Many Saints of Newark §	co-production with New Line Cinema, HBO Films and Chase Films
October 22, 2021	Dune §	distribution outside China only; produced by Legendary Pictures, Disruption Entertainment and Villeneuve Films
November 19, 2021	King Richard §	distribution outside Germany, Austria and Switzerland only; co-production with Westbrook Studios, Star Thrower Entertainment and Global Screen
November 24, 2021	8-Bit Christmas ‡	co-production with New Line Cinema and Star Thrower Entertainment; distributed by HBO Max
December 22, 2021	The Matrix Resurrections (Note: Co-owned by Alcon Entertainment) §	co-production with Village Roadshow Pictures and Venus Castina Productions

== 2022 ==
Release date	Title	Notes
January 27, 2022	The Fallout ‡	co-distribution with New Line Cinema and HBO Max only; produced by Clear Horizon, SSS Entertainment, The Burstein Company, 828 Media Capital and Clear Media Finance
February 10, 2022	Kimi ‡	co-production with New Line Cinema; distributed by HBO Max
March 4, 2022	The Batman	co-production with DC Films, 6th & Idaho and Dylan Clark Productions
March 31, 2022	Moonshot ‡	co-production with New Line Cinema, Berlanti/Schechter Films and Entertainment 360; distributed by HBO Max
April 11, 2022	Navalny	North American co-distribution with Fathom Events only; produced by Cottage M, Fishbowl Films, RaeFilm Studios, CNN Films and HBO Max
April 15, 2022	Fantastic Beasts: The Secrets of Dumbledore	co-production with Heyday Films
June 16, 2022	Father of the Bride ‡	co-production with Plan B Entertainment; distributed by HBO Max
June 24, 2022	Elvis	co-production with Bazmark Films and The Jackal Group
July 29, 2022	DC League of Super-Pets	co-production with Warner Animation Group, DC Entertainment and Seven Bucks Productions
September 23, 2022	Don't Worry Darling	co-production with New Line Cinema and Vertigo Entertainment
October 21, 2022	Black Adam	co-production with New Line Cinema, DC Films, Seven Bucks Productions and Flynn Picture Company
November 17, 2022	A Christmas Story Christmas ‡	co-production with Legendary Pictures, Wild West Picture Show Productions, and Toberoff Productions; distributed by HBO Max
November 18, 2022	Bones and All	home media and theatrical distribution outside the U.S., Italy and Scandinavia only; produced by Metro-Goldwyn-Mayer, Apartment Pictures, 3 Marys Entertainment, Wise Pictures, Memo Films, Tenderstories, Ela Film, Serfis, Immobiliare Manila and Frenesy Film Company
November 24, 2022	Holiday Harmony ‡	co-production with ESX Entertainment; distributed by HBO Max
November 24, 2022	A Christmas Mystery ‡	co-production with ESX Entertainment; distributed by HBO Max
December 1, 2022	A Hollywood Christmas ‡	co-production with ESX Entertainment; distributed by HBO Max

== 2023 ==
Release date	Title	Notes
January 5, 2023	Mummies	distribution only; produced by ESCine Espanol, 4 Cats Pictures and Anangu Group
January 13, 2023	House Party	distribution only; produced by New Line Cinema and SpringHill Company
February 10, 2023	Magic Mike's Last Dance	co-production with Free Association
March 3, 2023	Creed III	home media and theatrical distribution outside the U.S. and Scandinavia only; produced by Metro-Goldwyn-Mayer, Balboa Productions, Chartoff Productions, Winkler Films and Proximity Media
March 17, 2023	Shazam! Fury of the Gods	co-production with New Line Cinema, DC Films and The Safran Company
April 5, 2023	Air	home media and theatrical distribution outside the U.S. and India only; produced by Amazon Studios, Skydance Media, Artists Equity and Mandalay Pictures
April 21, 2023	Evil Dead Rise	distribution outside the U.K., Ireland and France only; produced by New Line Cinema, Raimi Productions and Ghost House Pictures
June 16, 2023	The Flash	co-production with DC Films, The Disco Factory and Double Dream
July 21, 2023	Barbie	co-production with Mattel Studios, LuckyChap Entertainment and Heyday Films
August 4, 2023	Meg 2: The Trench	distribution outside China only; co-production with Gravity Pictures, CMC Pictures, Alibaba Pictures and Di Bonaventura Pictures
August 18, 2023	Blue Beetle	co-production with DC Films and The Safran Company
August 25, 2023	Bottoms	theatrical distribution in Canada, Australia, Ireland, New Zealand and the United Kingdom only; produced by Metro-Goldwyn-Mayer, Orion Pictures and Brownstone Productions
September 8, 2023	The Nun II	distribution only; produced by New Line Cinema, Atomic Monster and The Safran Company
November 17, 2023	Saltburn	select international theatrical distribution only; produced by Metro-Goldwyn-Mayer, MRC, LuckyChap Entertainment and Lie Still
December 15, 2023	Wonka	co-production with Village Roadshow Pictures, The Roald Dahl Story Company and Heyday Films (Note: Released in international theaters on December 6, 2023.)
December 22, 2023	Aquaman and the Lost Kingdom	co-production with DC Films, Atomic Monster and The Safran Company
December 25, 2023	The Color Purple	co-production with OW Films, Amblin Entertainment, SGS Pictures and Quincy Jones Productions

== 2024 ==
Release date	Title	Notes
January 4, 2024	The Boys in the Boat	Canadian, U.K., Irish, Australian and New Zealand theatrical distribution only; produced by Metro-Goldwyn-Mayer, Smokehouse Pictures, Spyglass Media Group, Tempesta Films and Anonymous Content
March 1, 2024	Dune: Part Two	distribution outside China only; produced by Legendary Pictures, Disruption Entertainment and Villeneuve Films
March 29, 2024	Godzilla x Kong: The New Empire	distribution outside Japan and China only; produced by Legendary Pictures, Toho and Disruption Entertainment
April 26, 2024	Challengers	home media and theatrical distribution outside the U.S. only; produced by Metro-Goldwyn-Mayer, Frenesy Film Company, Why Are You Acting? and Pascal Pictures (Note: Released in international theaters on April 18, 2024.)
May 2, 2024	Turtles All the Way Down ‡	co-production with New Line Cinema and Temple Hill Entertainment; distributed by Max
May 24, 2024	Furiosa: A Mad Max Saga	co-production with Kennedy Miller Mitchell
May 29, 2024	The Commandant's Shadow	co-distribution with HBO Documentary Films and Fathom Events only; produced by Snowstorm Productions, New Mandate Films and Creators, Inc.
June 6, 2024	Am I OK? ‡	co-distribution with Max only; produced by Gloria Sanchez Productions, Picturestart, TeaTime Pictures and Something Fierce Productions
June 7, 2024	The Watchers	distribution only; produced by New Line Cinema, Blinding Edge Pictures and Inimitable Pictures
June 28, 2024	Horizon: An American Saga – Chapter 1	North American, UK, Irish, Italian, Dutch and Spanish distribution only; produced by New Line Cinema and Territory Pictures
July 19, 2024	Twisters	international distribution only; co-production with Universal Pictures, Amblin Entertainment and The Kennedy/Marshall Company (Note: Released in international theaters on July 10, 2024.)
August 2, 2024	Trap	distribution only; produced by Blinding Edge Pictures
August 23, 2024	Blink Twice	home media and theatrical distribution outside the U.S. only; produced by Metro-Goldwyn-Mayer, Free Association, This Is Important Productions and Bold Choices (Note: Released in international theaters on August 21, 2024.)
September 6, 2024	Beetlejuice Beetlejuice	co-production with Plan B Entertainment, Tim Burton Productions and The Geffen Company
September 21, 2024	Super/Man: The Christopher Reeve Story	co-distribution with DC Studios, HBO Documentary Films, CNN Films and Max only; produced by Words + Pictures, Passion Pictures, Misfits Entertainment, and Jenco Films
September 26, 2024	My Old Ass	Canadian, Australian and New Zealand theatrical distribution only; produced by Indian Paintbrush and LuckyChap Entertainment
September 27, 2024	The Curse of the Necklace	distribution only; produced by ESX Entertainment
October 3, 2024	'Salem's Lot ‡	co-production with New Line Cinema, Atomic Monster, Vertigo Entertainment and Wolper Organization; distributed by Max
October 4, 2024	Joker: Folie à Deux	co-production with Joint Effort
October 10, 2024	Caddo Lake ‡	co-production with New Line Cinema, Blinding Edge Pictures and K Period Media; distributed by Max
November 1, 2024	Juror #2	co-production with Dichotomy, Gotham Group and Malpaso Productions
November 15, 2024	Red One	home media and theatrical distribution outside the U.S., France and India only; produced by Metro-Goldwyn-Mayer, Seven Bucks Productions, Chris Morgan Productions, The Detective Agency and Big Indie Pictures (Note: Released in international theaters on November 6, 2024.)
November 28, 2024	Sweethearts ‡	co-production with New Line Cinema and Picturestart; distributed by Max
December 13, 2024	The Lord of the Rings: The War of the Rohirrim	distribution only; produced by New Line Cinema, Warner Bros. Animation, WingNut Films, and Sola Entertainment

== 2025 ==
Release date	Title	Notes
January 31, 2025	Companion	distribution only; produced by New Line Cinema, BoulderLight Pictures, Vertigo Entertainment and Subconscious
March 7, 2025	Mickey 17	co-production with Plan B Entertainment, Offscreen and Kate Street Picture Company
March 13, 2025	The Parenting ‡	co-production with New Line Cinema and Good Fear Content; distributed by Max
March 21, 2025	The Alto Knights	co-production with Winkler Films
March 28, 2025	A Working Man	home media and theatrical distribution outside the U.S., France, Greece, Cyprus, the CIS, the Middle East and Asia only; produced by Metro-Goldwyn-Mayer, Black Bear Pictures, Balboa Productions, CAT5, Fifth Season, BlockFilm and Cedar Park Entertainment
April 4, 2025	A Minecraft Movie	distribution outside China only; co-production with Legendary Pictures, Mojang Studios, Vertigo Entertainment and On the Roam Productions
April 18, 2025	Sinners	co-production with Proximity Media
April 25, 2025	The Accountant 2	home media and theatrical distribution outside the U.S., France, Japan and India only; co-production with Metro-Goldwyn-Mayer, Artists Equity, 51 Entertainment, Zero Gravity Management and Filmtribe
May 16, 2025	Final Destination Bloodlines	distribution only; produced by New Line Cinema, Practical Pictures, Freshman Year and Fireside Films
June 27, 2025	F1	distribution only; produced by Apple Original Films, Monolith Pictures, Jerry Bruckheimer Films, Plan B Entertainment and Dawn Apollo Films (Note: Released in international theaters on June 25, 2025.)
July 11, 2025	Superman	distribution only; produced by DC Studios, Troll Court Entertainment and The Safran Company (Note: Released in international theaters on July 9, 2025.)
August 2, 2025	Tom and Jerry: Forbidden Compass	co-production with China Film Co., Ltd., Origin Animation, and Turner Entertainment Co. (Note: Released in the U.S. on September 4, 2026 by Viva Kids.)
August 8, 2025	Weapons	distribution only; produced by New Line Cinema, Subconscious, Vertigo Entertainment and BoulderLight Pictures
September 5, 2025	The Conjuring: Last Rites	distribution only; produced by New Line Cinema, Atomic Monster, and The Safran Company
September 26, 2025	One Battle After Another	co-production with Ghoulardi Film Company
October 15, 2025	The Family McMullen	limited release; co-production with Marlboro Road Gang Productions; co-distributed in the U.S. by Fathom Entertainment

== 2026 ==
Release date	Title	Notes
February 13, 2026	Wuthering Heights	co-production with MRC, Lie Still and LuckyChap Entertainment (Note: Released in international theaters on February 11, 2026.)
March 6, 2026	The Bride!	co-production with First Love Films and In the Current Company
March 27, 2026	They Will Kill You	distribution only; produced by New Line Cinema and Nocturna
April 17, 2026	Lee Cronin's The Mummy	distribution only; produced by New Line Cinema, Blumhouse Productions, Atomic Monster and Wicked/Good
May 8, 2026	Mortal Kombat II	distribution only; produced by New Line Cinema, Atomic Monster, Broken Road Productions and Fireside Films
June 26, 2026	Supergirl	distribution only; produced by DC Studios, Troll Court Entertainment and The Safran Company
July 10, 2026	Evil Dead Burn	North American distribution only; produced by New Line Cinema, Screen Gems and Ghost House Pictures
August 14, 2026	The End of Oak Street	co-production with Bad Robot and Jackson Pictures
August 28, 2026	Coyote vs. Acme	studio credit and copyright holder only; produced by Warner Animation Group, Troll Court Entertainment and Keylight Pictures; distributed by Ketchup Entertainment
September 11, 2026	Practical Magic 2	co-production with Alcon Entertainment, Fortis Films, Blossom Films and Di Novi Pictures
October 2, 2026	Digger	distribution outside China only; co-production with Legendary Entertainment, TC Productions and M Productions
October 9, 2026	Double Trouble	distribution only; co-distribution with Seismic Releasing; produced by ESX Entertainment
October 23, 2026	Clayface	distribution only; produced by DC Studios, 6th & Idaho, Troll Court Entertainment and The Safran Company
November 6, 2026	The Cat in the Hat	co-production with Warner Bros. Pictures Animation, Dr. Seuss Enterprises and A Stern Talking To

== Upcoming ==
Release date	Title	Notes	Production status
December 18, 2026	Dune: Part Three	distribution outside China only; co-production with Villeneuve Films and Legendary Entertainment	Completed
January 22, 2027	Animal Friends	distribution outside China only; produced by Legendary Entertainment, Maximum Effort and Prime Focus Studios	Completed
February 5, 2027	Remain	co-production with Blinding Edge Pictures	Completed
February 26, 2027	The Revenge of La Llorona	distribution only; produced by New Line Cinema, Blumhouse Atomic, Coin Operated and Latchkey Productions	Post-production
March 12, 2027	Untitled WB/New Line event film	distribution only; produced by New Line Cinema	TBA
March 26, 2027	Godzilla x Kong: Supernova	distribution outside Japan and China only; co-production with Legendary Entertainment and Toho	Post-production
April 9, 2027	Panic Carefully	co-production with Esmail Corp, Bluegrass 7 and Red OM Films	Post-production
May 14, 2027	F.A.S.T.	co-production with Heyday Films and Bosque Ranch Productions	Post-production
May 21, 2027	Bad Fairies	co-production with Warner Bros. Pictures Animation and Locksmith Animation	Post-production
June 25, 2027	Untitled Ocean's Eleven prequel	co-production with Alcon Entertainment, LuckyChap Entertainment and Everyman Pictures	Post-production
July 9, 2027	Man of Tomorrow	distribution only; produced by DC Studios, Troll Court Entertainment and The Safran Company	Post-production
July 23, 2027	A Minecraft Movie Squared	distribution outside China only; co-production with Legendary Entertainment, Xbox Pictures, Mojang Studios, Vertigo Entertainment and On the Roam Productions	Post-production
August 13, 2027	Shiver	co-production with Ryder Picture Company and Marv Studios	Post-production
September 10, 2027	The Conjuring: First Communion	co-production with New Line Cinema and the Safran Company	Post-production
October 1, 2027	The Great Beyond	co-production with Bad Robot	Post-production
November 12, 2027	Margie Claus	co-production with Warner Bros. Pictures Animation and On the Day Productions	In production
December 17, 2027	The Lord of the Rings: The Hunt for Gollum	distribution only; produced by New Line Cinema and Dominic Pictures	Post-production
December 25, 2027	Paris Paramount		Post-production
February 18, 2028	The Batman: Part II	distribution only; produced by DC Studios, 6th & Idaho and Dylan Clark Productions	Filming
March 17, 2028	Oh, the Places You'll Go!	co-production with Warner Bros. Pictures Animation, Dr. Seuss Enterprises and Bad Robot Productions	In production
April 7, 2028	Evil Dead Wrath	North American distribution only; produced by New Line Cinema, Screen Gems and Ghost House Pictures	Post-production
May 12, 2028	Final Destination 7	distribution only; produced by New Line Cinema	Pre-production
July 21, 2028	Untitled Hello Kitty film	distribution only; produced by Warner Bros. Pictures Animation, New Line Cinema, Sanrio and FlynnPictureCo.	In production
August 11, 2028	The Flood	distribution only; produced by New Line Cinema, Amblin Entertainment, Subconscious and Vertigo Entertainment	Pre-production
September 8, 2028	Gladys	distribution only; produced by New Line Cinema and Vertigo Entertainment	Pre-production
September 22, 2028	Dynamic Duo	distribution only; produced by DC Studios, Warner Bros. Pictures Animation, Swaybox and 6th & Idaho	In production
October 6, 2028	Gremlins 3	co-production with Amblin Entertainment and 26th Street Pictures	Pre-production
November 3, 2028	The Lunar Chronicles	co-production with Warner Bros. Pictures Animation and Locksmith Animation	In production
November 22, 2028	Untitled Joan of Arc film	co-production with Bazmark Films	Pre-production
June 1, 2029	Game of Thrones: Aegon's Conquest		Pre-production

=== Undated films ===
Release date	Title	Notes	Production status
Late 2026	The Spiral	co-distribution with New Line Cinema in North America, Hong Kong, Taiwan, the Philippines, Thailand, Indonesia, Malaysia and Vietnam only; produced by Rai Cinema, Propaganda and Dinamo Film	Completed
2027	Nasty	distribution under Warner Bros. Clockwork only; produced by LuckyChap Entertainment	Pre-production
2027	Ti Amo!	distribution outside France under Warner Bros. Clockwork only; produced by FilmNation Entertainment, Cre Film and Rapt Film	Pre-production
TBA	Attack of the 50 Foot Woman	co-production with Tim Burton Productions	Pre-production
TBA	A Chris Farley Story	distribution only; produced by New Line Cinema and Broadway Video	Pre-production
TBA	Cut Off	distribution only; produced by Strong Baby Productions	Post-production
TBA	Horizon: An American Saga – Chapter 2	US distribution with New Line Cinema only; produced by Territory Pictures	Completed
TBA	The Jetsons		Pre-production
TBA	Ocean's 14	co-production with Alcon Entertainment, Smokehouse Pictures and 87North Productions	Pre-production

=== In development ===
Title	Notes
Alien Legion	co-production with Angry Films
The Amazing World of Gumball: The Movie!	co-production with Hanna-Barbera Studios Europe
Attack on Titan	co-production with Kodansha and Appian Way Productions
Avengelyne	co-production with LuckyChap Entertainment and Genre Films
BAM Bus	distribution only; produced by New Line Cinema and Panoramic Media
The Bet	co-production with 42
Billy Summers	co-production with Bad Robot Productions and Appian Way Productions
Black	co-production with Black Mask Studios and Studio 8
Black Samurai	co-production with Inward Gaze
Bleach	
The Bodyguard	co-production with Kasdan Pictures and Rideback
Bugs Bunny	co-production with Warner Bros. Pictures Animation
The Brave and the Bold	distribution only, produced by DC Studios and Double Dream
Calamity Hustle	co-production with Walsh Company, Free Association, Maximum Effort and Persons Attempting
Care Bears	co-production with Good Fear Content, GoldDay and Cloudco Entertainment
China Rich Girlfriend	co-production with Color Force and Ivanhoe Pictures
A Christmas Carol	co-production with Maiden Voyage Pictures
City of Angels	co-production with Atlas Entertainment and Perez Pictures
Constantine 2	distribution only, produced by DC Studios, Weed Road Pictures, Di Bonaventura Pictures, and Bad Robot Productions
Disaster Wedding	co-production with End Cue
Drowning: The Rescue of Flight 1421	co-production with The Story Factory
Emily the Strange	co-production with Warner Bros. Pictures Animation and Bad Robot
The Executioner	co-production with The Safran Company
Exposure	co-production with Double Dream
Forbidden Planet	
The Goonies 2	co-production with Amblin Entertainment, 26th Street Pictures and The Donners' Company
Hot Wheels	co-production with Mattel Studios and Bad Robot Productions
How to Rule the World	co-production with Pascal Pictures
The Hunger	co-production with Berlanti Schechter
I Am Legend 2	co-production with Alcon Entertainment, Outlier Society, Westbrook Studios and Weed Road Pictures
I Pretended to Be a Missing Girl	co-production with Vertigo Entertainment, Underground Pictures and Fifty-Fifty Films
The Ice Dragon	co-production with Warner Bros. Pictures Animation
In Five Years	distribution only; produced by New Line Cinema and Working Title Films
Keeper of the Lost Cities	co-production with Green Bean Pictures
Killer Vacation	co-production with the Safran Company
The Land of Stories	
The Last Train to New York	distribution outside France and Korea only; produced by New Line Cinema, Atomic Monster, Gaumont, Next Entertainment World and Coin Operated
Lethal Weapon 5 ‡	co-production with Silver Pictures, Icon Productions, The Donners' Company and Rideback; distributed by HBO Max
The Lincoln Highway	co-production with Heyday Films and American Light & Fixture
The Lord of the Rings: Shadow of the Past	co-production with New Line Cinema and WingNut Films
The Lost Boys	co-production with Automatik Entertainment
The Masters of Mini-Golf ‡	co-production with Orchard Farm Productions; distributed by HBO Max
Maude v Maude	co-production with HalleHolly and RK Films
Meebo and Me	co-production with Khalabo Ink Society and Lit Entertainment Group
Meerkat Manor	co-production with Warner Bros. Pictures Animation, The Green Room, Oxford Scientific Films and ITV Studios
Meet the Flintstones	co-production with Warner Bros. Pictures Animation
Methuselah	co-production with Heyday Films and Outlier Society
The Mist	co-production with Spyglass Media Group and Red Room Pictures
My What If Year	co-production with Take Fountain
Night People	co-production with Plan B Entertainment and Good World Productions
The Pinkerton	co-production with Bad Robot Productions
Playground	co-production with Plan B Entertainment
Prehistoria	co-production with Warner Bros. Pictures Animation and SpindleHorse
Romantic Comedy	distribution only; produced by New Line Cinema and Hello Sunshine
Rich People Problems	co-production with Color Force and Ivanhoe Pictures
Shibumi	co-production with 87Eleven Productions and 87North Productions
Siren Head	co-production with Vertigo Entertainment, 12:01 Films and Jurassic Party Productions
Space Invaders	distribution only; produced by New Line Cinema, Weed Road Pictures and Safehouse Pictures
The Sundance Kid Might Have Some Regrets	co-production with Jackson Pictures
Swamp Thing	distribution only; produced by DC Studios
Terrified	co-production with 26 Keys Productions
Thaw	distribution only; produced by New Line Cinema, Gunpowder & Sky and Aperture Entertainment
Them!	co-production with 6th & Idaho
Theo of Golden	co-production with Playtone
Thing One and Thing Two	co-production with Warner Bros. Pictures Animation and Dr. Seuss Enterprises
ThunderCats	co-production with Rideback and Vertigo Entertainment
Under Siege	co-production with Regency Enterprises
Under Story	co-production with Heyday Films
Undo	distribution only, produced by New Line Cinema and FlynnPictureCo
Untitled Bamm-Bamm Rubble film	co-production with Open Invite Entertainment
Untitled Bane and Deathstroke film	distribution only; produced by DC Studios
Untitled Crazy Rich Asians spin-off	co-production with Color Force and SK Global
Untitled fifth Matrix film	co-production with Alcon Entertainment, Silver Pictures and Venus Castina Productions
Untitled Frank Bullitt film	co-production with Amblin Entertainment
Untitled Funko film	co-production with Warner Bros. Pictures Animation and Funko
Untitled Get Smart film	
Untitled Metal Men film	distribution only; produced by DC Studios
Untitled Pokémon Detective Pikachu sequel	co-production with Legendary Entertainment and The Pokémon Company
Untitled Powerpuff Girls film	co-production with Warner Bros. Pictures Animation and Cartoon Network Studios
Untitled Rick and Morty film	co-production with Williams Street
Untitled Speedy Gonzales film	co-production with Warner Bros. Pictures Animation
Untitled Teen Titans film	distribution only; produced by DC Studios
Untitled Teen Titans Go! To the Movies sequel	distribution only; produced by DC Studios and Warner Bros. Animation
Untitled Teyana Taylor comedy film	co-production with The Aunties
Untitled third Sherlock Holmes film	co-production with Alcon Entertainment, Silver Pictures, Rideback and Team Downey
Untitled Tom and Jerry film	co-production with Warner Bros. Pictures Animation
Untitled U.S. Airman rescue film	co-production with 6th & Idaho
Untitled Wonder Woman film	distribution only; produced by DC Studios
With the 8th Pick	co-production with Religion of Sports and Star Thrower Entertainment
The Wizard of Oz	distribution only; produced by New Line Cinema, The Hideaway Entertainment and Temple Hill Entertainment
The Women	
Wonka 2	co-production with Alcon Entertainment, The Roald Dahl Story Company and Heyday Films
You've Got Mail	co-production with Original Film

== See also ==
- List of Warner Bros. International films (2020–2029)
- List of Warner Bros. Pictures Animation productions
- List of Cartoon Network films
- List of New Line Cinema films
- List of HBO Films
- List of HBO Max original films
- List of films based on DC publications
- List of Warner Bros. theatrical animated feature films
- Category:Lists of films by studio
