= List of Warner Bros. International films (2020–2029) =

The following is a list of foreign films produced, co-produced, and/or distributed by Warner Bros. internationally in 2020–2029. This does not include films released under joint ventures. For the German films Warner Bros. co-distributed with X Verleih AG, see X Filme Creative Pool.

- A † signifies a PVOD release.

== 2020 ==
Release Date	Title	Country	Notes
January 16, 2020	The Heist Of The Century	Argentina	distribution only; produced by AZ Films, MarVista Entertainment and Telefe
January 17, 2020	32 Malasana Street	Spain	co-production with Mr. Fields and Friends, Atresmedia Cine, Bambú Producciones, Malasaña Movie AIE and 4Cats Pictures
January 17, 2020	Me contro Te - Il film: La vendetta del Signor S	Italy	co-production with Colorado Film
January 23, 2020	The Wedding	Germany	co-production with Barefoot Films, Erfttal Film and SevenPictures Film
January 31, 2020	AI Amok	Japan	distribution only; produced by CREDEUS
February 13, 2020	Nightlife	Germany	distribution only; produced by Wiedemann & Berg Film, Sentana Filmproduktion and SevenPictures Film
February 20, 2020	Lassie Come Home	Germany	co-production with Henning Ferber Filmproduktionsm, Traumfabrik Babelsberg, Südstern Film
March 6, 2020	Masked Ward	Japan	distribution only; produced by FINE Entertainment
July 2, 2020	Takeover	Germany	co-production with Pantaleon Films
August 7, 2020	Grand Blue	Japan	
August 13, 2020	Divine	Germany	German distribution only; co-production with X-Filme Creative Pool
September 17, 2020	Hello Again: A Wedding a Day	Germany	co-production with Sommerhaus Filmproduktion
September 18, 2020	My Missing Valentine	Taiwan	distribution only; produced by 1 Production Film, Ambassandor Theatres, Mandarin Vision and Ocean Deep Films
October 1, 2020	Jim Button and the Wild 13	Germany	co-production with Malao Film and Rat Pack Filmproduktion
October 8, 2020	You Came Back	Italy	co-production with Picomedia
October 21, 2020	Miss	France	distribution only; produced by Chapka Films and Zazi Films
October 22, 2020	Cortex	Germany	co-production with Paloma Entertainment
October 30, 2020	Tonkatsu DJ Agetaro	Japan	
November 12, 2020	The Day I Died: Unclosed Case	South Korea	distribution only; produced by Oscar 10 Studio and Story Pong
November 13, 2020	The Legacy of Dr. Death: Black File	Japan	
November 27, 2020	The Beast	Italy	co-production with Groenlandia
December 4, 2020	The Summer We Lived	Spain	co-production with Mr. Fields and Friends, Atresmedia Cine, Bambú Producciones, Aquel Verano Movie AIE and 4Cats Pictures
December 10, 2020	Josée	South Korea	distribution only; produced by Dice Film and Generation Blue Films
December 13, 2020	In vacanza su Marte †	Italy	co-production with Indiana Production and Cattleya

== 2021 ==
Release Date	Title	Country	Notes
January 8, 2021	Gintama: The Very Final	Japan	distribution only; produced by BN Pictures
February 10, 2021	I Missed You	Taiwan	distribution only; produced by Dear Studio Production
February 11, 2021	Under the Open Sky	Japan	theatrical distribution only; produced by Aoi Pro
March 5, 2021	The Sun Does Not Move	Japan	distribution only; produced by Robot Communications
April 21, 2021	Don't Kill Me †	Italy	co-production with Vivo Film
May 20, 2021	Dirty Clothes Are Washed At Home	Mexico	distribution only; produced by Barracuda Films and Rio Negro Producciones
June 4, 2021	Rurouni Kenshin: The Beginning	Japan	
June 4, 2021	Dream Horse	United Kingdom	distribution only; produced by Film4, Ingenious Media, FFilm Cymru Wales and Raw
June 25, 2021	Âku	Japan	
July 8, 2021	The Kids Are Alright	Spain	
July 15, 2021	Next Door	Germany	co-production with Amusement Park Films, Erfttal Film and Gretchenfilm
July 29, 2021	Commitment Phobia	Germany	co-production with Pantaleon Films, Brainpool and WS Filmproduktion
August 18, 2021	Me contro Te - Il film: Il mistero della scuola incantata	Italy	co-production with Colorado Film
September 2, 2021	Confessions of Felix Krull	Germany	theatrical distribution only; produced by Bavaria Filmproduktion
September 9, 2021	Wet Dog	Germany	co-production with Carte Blanche International and A Company Film & Licensing
October 7, 2021	The Catholic School	Italy	co-production with Picomedia
October 7, 2021	Tochter	Germany	co-production with Heimatfilm
October 8, 2021	Outlaws	Spain	
October 20, 2021	Little Nicholas' Treasure	France	distribution in France and Belgium only; produced by Curiosa Films
October 29, 2021	And So the Baton Is Passed	Japan	distribution only; produced by Nippon Television Network
November 11, 2021	The Salvation of The World as We Know It	Germany	co-production with Barefoot Films, Erfttal Film and Perathon Film
November 18, 2021	My Son	Germany	co-production with Akzente Film
December 3, 2021	Boxing Day	United Kingdom	distribution only; produced by Film4, BFI, Rocket Science, DJ Films and Studio 113
December 9, 2021	Laura's Star	Germany	co-production with Westside Filmproduktion and Rothkirch Cartoon-Film
December 17, 2021	You Keep the Kids!	Spain	
December 25, 2021	7 Women and a Murder	Italy	co-production with Wildside

== 2022 ==
Release Date	Title	Country	Notes
January 1, 2022	Me contro Te - Il film: Persi nel tempo	Italy	co-production with Colorado Film
January 27, 2022	Ecos De Un Crimen	Argentina	distribution only; produced by Particular Crowd and Tieless Media
January 28, 2022	Noise	Japan	
February 3, 2022	Wunderschön	Germany	co-production with Hellinger / Doll Filmproduktion
February 11, 2022	Usogui	Japan	
February 17, 2022	Der Pfad	Germany	co-production with Eyrie Entertainment, Fasten Films and Lemming Film
February 25, 2022	The Duke	United Kingdom	distribution only; produced by Pathé, Ingenious Media, Neon Films and Screen Yorkshire
March 4, 2022	The Last 10 Years	Japan	distribution only; produced by Robot Communications
March 9, 2022	Licence to Build	France	distribution in France and Belgium only; produced by Marvelous Productions
March 12, 2022	The Nan Movie	United Kingdom	distribution only; produced by Great Point Media, Lip Sync Productions, DJ Films, Merlin Films, Zahala Productions and Sulcata Productions
March 18, 2022	Other People	Poland	distribution only; produced by Warner Bros. Entertainment Polska Sp.z o.o
March 25, 2022	Camera Café, la película	Spain	distribution only: produced by Atresmedia Cine, Estela Films and Pólvora Films
April 13, 2022	The Key Game	Spain	distribution only: produced by Atresmedia Cine, Benidorm Films and Buendía Estudios
April 15, 2022	Operation Mincemeat	United Kingdom	distribution in the U.K., Ireland, France, Germany, Spain, Italy and the Benelux only; produced by FilmNation Entertainment, Cross City Films, See-Saw Films, Cohen Media Group and Archery Films
April 26, 2022	Sulle Nuvole	Italy	co-production with Cinemaundici
April 28, 2022	En La Mira	Argentina	distribution only; produced by AZ Films, Cimarrón Cine and MarVista Entertainment
April 28, 2022	Wolke Unterm Dach	Germany	co-production with Pantaleon Films
May 13, 2022	Bubble	Japan	distribution only; produced by Wit Studio
May 19, 2022	Quatro Amigas numa Fria	Brazil	co-production with Gullane Filmes; distributed by Buena Vista International
May 25, 2022	Men On The Verge Of A Nervous Breakdown	France	distribution only; produced by Curiosa Films
June 3, 2022	Live Is Life	Spain	distribution only: produced by Atresmedia Cine and 4 Cats Pictures
June 16, 2022	Die Geschichte der Menschheit - leicht gekürzt	Germany	co-production with Pantaleon Films, Gerda Film, Brainpool and WS Filmproduktion
August 3, 2022	Il mammone	Italy	co-production with Picomedia and Colorado Film
August 11, 2022	Tang	Japan	distribution only; produced by Twins Japan
August 12, 2022	Por los pelos, una historia de autoestima	Spain	distribution only; produced by Atresmedia Cine and Buendía Estudios
August 25, 2022	A Singular Crime	Argentina	distribution only; produced by Particular Crowd, Mediabyte and Pampa Films
August 31, 2022	Over & Out	Germany	co-production with Oma Inge Film, SamFilm and Magic Media Production
September 2, 2022	The Te$t	Spain	co-production with Atresmedia Cine, Álamo Producciones and Audiovisuales
September 15, 2022	L'immensità	Italy; France	Italian distribution only; co-production with Wildside, Chapter 2, Pathé and France 3 Cinéma
September 22, 2022	A Thousand Lines	Germany	co-production with UFA Fiction and Feine Filme
October 6, 2022	God's Crooked Lines	Spain	distribution only; produced by Nostromo Pictures, Atresmedia Cine and Filmayer
October 7, 2022	The Lost King	United Kingdom	distribution only; produced by Pathé, BBC Film, Ingenious Media, Creative Scotland, BFI and Baby Cow Productions
October 14, 2022	Emily	United Kingdom	distribution only; produced by Embankment Films, Ingenious Media, Tempo Productions and Arenamedia
October 22, 2022	Simone Veil, A Woman of the Century	France	distribution in France and Belgium only; produced by Marvelous Productions
October 27, 2022	Rheingold	Germany	co-production with Bombero International, Corazón International, Palosanto Films, Rai Cinema and Lemming Film
October 27, 2022	Motherhood	Japan	
November 3, 2022	The Club Of Angels	Brazil	co-production with Ukbar Filmes; distributed by Vitrine Filmes
November 3, 2022	Hui Buh und das Hexenschloss	Germany	co-production with Rat Pack Filmproduktion
November 17, 2022	Just Something Nice	Germany	co-production with Hellinger / Doll Filmproduktion
November 18, 2022	Tata	Poland	distribution only; produced by Metro Films
December 1, 2022	Dark Satellites	Germany	co-production with Sommerhaus Filmproduktion
December 2, 2022	The Kids Are Alright 2	Spain	distribution only; produced by Bowfinger International Pictures and Atresmedia Cine
December 22, 2022	Oskar's Dress	Germany	co-production with Pantaleon Films and Erfttal Film

== 2023 ==
Release Date	Title	Country	Notes
January 1, 2023	Tre Di Troppo	Italy	co-production with Colorado Film
January 19. 2023	Me contro Te - il Film: Missione Giungla	Italy	co-production with Colorado Film
January 27, 2023	Unwelcome	United Kingdom	distribution only; produced by Ingenious Media and Tempo Productions
February 10, 2023	The Communion Girl	Spain	distribution only; produced by Ikiru Films, La Terraza Films and La Niña de la Comunión AIE
February 23, 2023	When Will It Be Again Like It Never Was Before	Germany	co-production with Komplizen Film and Frakas Productions
February 24, 2023	Mummies	Spain	distribution only; produced by Atresmedia Cine, 4Cats Pictures, Anangu Grup and Moomios Movie AIE
March 15, 2023	Sage-homme	France	distribution in France and Belgium only; produced by Marvelous Productions and France 2 Cinema
March 17, 2023	Allelujah	United Kingdom	distribution only; produced by Pathé, BBC Film, Ingenious Media, DJ Films and Redstart Productions
April 6, 2023	The Extortion	Argentina	distribution only; produced by 100 Bares, Cimarrón Cine, Infinity Hill and Particular Crowd
April 28, 2023	Good Manners	Spain	distribution only; produced by Atresmedia Cine, Escándalo Films and ESCAC Studio
May 10, 2023	Hawaii	France	distribution in France and Belgium only; produced by France 2 Cinéma and Marvelous Productions
June 2, 2023	How to Become a Modern Man	Spain	distribution only; produced by Atresmedia Cine, Áralan Films and Como Dios manda la película AIE
July 9, 2023	Tokyo Revengers	Japan	distribution only; produced by Kadokawa
August 25, 2023	Caged Wings	Spain	distribution only; produced by Nostromo Pictures
September 15, 2023	Maboroshi	Japan	distribution only; produced by MAPPA
October 4, 2023	Bernadette	France	distribution in France and Belgium only; produced by Karé Productions
October 6, 2023	The Great Escaper	United Kingdom	distribution only; produced by Pathé, BBC Film, Ecosse Films, Film i Väst and Filmgate Films
October 11, 2023	Me he hecho viral	Spain, Argentina	
October 19, 2023	Ein Fest fürs Leben	Germany	co-production with UFA Fiction and Feine Filme
October 19, 2023	Me contro Te - Il film: Vacanze in Transilvania	Italy	co-production with Colorado Film
November 1, 2023	Jokes & Cigarettes	Spain	distribution only; produced by Atresmedia Cine, La Terraza Films and Ikiru Films
November 30, 2023	Home Education	Italy	co-production with Indiana Production and BlackBox Multimedia
November 30, 2023	As Aventuras de Poliana: O Filme	Brazil	co-production with Panorâmica and SBT
December 1, 2023	Lumberjack the Monster	Japan	
December 25, 2023	Mallari	Philippines	distribution in Philippines, Thailand and Singapore only; produced by Mentorque Productions and Clever Minds Inc.

== 2024 ==
Release Date	Title	Country	Notes
January 1, 2024	One Life	United Kingdom	U.K. and Irish distribution only; produced by BBC Film, MBK Productions, See-Saw Films, Cross City Films, FilmNation Entertainment and LipSync
January 26, 2024	Bad Hair Day	Spain	distribution only; produced by Atresmedia Cine, Chicas del Barroco AIE and Pokeepsie Films
February 1, 2024	A Million Minutes	Germany	co-production with Hellinger / Doll Filmproduktion, herbX film and Erfttal Film
March 11, 2024	Under Parallel Skies	Philippines; Hong Kong	distribution only; produced by 28 Squared Studios and Two Infinity Entertainment
March 13, 2024	Lucky Winners	France	distribution only; produced by Les Improductibles, Marvelous Productions, France 2 Cinéma and C8 Films
April 11, 2024	Traces of Love	Brazil	distribution only; produced by Framboesa Filmes and Particular Crowd
April 19, 2024	The Yin Yang Master Zero	Japan	distribution only; produced by Robot Communications
May 17, 2024	Missing	Japan	distribution only; produced by SS Kobo
June 1, 2024	Me contro Te - Il film: Operazione spie	Italy	co-production with Colorado Film
August 9, 2024	Blue Period	Japan	
August 14, 2024	Buffalo Kids	Spain	distribution in Spain, the U.K., Ireland and Italy only; produced by 4Cats Pictures, Atresmedia Cine, Anangu Grup, Little Big Boy AIE and Mogambo Productions
August 15, 2024	Princesa Adormecida	Brazil	co-production with Panorâmica; distributed by Manequim Filmes
August 29, 2024	Estômago II: O Poderoso Chef	Brazil	co-production with Zencrane Filmes and Telecine; distributed by Paris Filmes
September 5, 2024	Die Ironie des Lebens	Germany	co-production with Sunny Side Up Filmproduktion
September 6, 2024	A Conviction of Marriage	Japan	
September 12, 2024	Taklee Genesis x Worlds Collide	Thailand	distribution only; produced by Neramitnung Film and Titan Capital Group Holding
September 12, 2024	Come far litigare mamma e papà	Italy	co-production with GreenBoo Production
October 18, 2024	The Room Next Door	Spain	distribution in Spain, the U.K., Ireland, Italy, Germany, Latin America, Scandinavia, Central and Eastern Europe excluding Poland and select Asia-Pacific territories including Japan only; produced by El Deseo
October 24, 2024	Parthenope	Italy; France	Italian theatrical distribution only; produced by PiperFilm, The Apartment Pictures and Pathé
October 25, 2024	Doubles Match	Taiwan	distribution only; produced by Rise Pictures and Sky Films
November 7, 2024	Letters to Santa 6	Poland	co-production with TVN Warner Bros. Discovery
November 21, 2024	Una terapia di gruppo	Italy	co-production with Picomedia
November 29, 2024	Ask Me What You Want	Spain	co-production with Versus Entertainment, Lyo Media and 4Cats
December 4, 2024	And Their Children After Them	France	distribution in France and Belgium only; produced by Chi-Fou-Mi Productions, Trésor Films and France 3 Cinéma.
December 12, 2024	Me contro Te: Cattivissimi a Natale	Italy	co-production with Colorado Film
December 13, 2024	Cells at Work!	Japan	distribution only; produced by Flag Pictures and Kodansha
December 25, 2024	Les Cadeaux	France	distribution in France and Belgium only; produced by Karé Productions and Marvelous Productions
December 25, 2024	Babies Don't Come with Instructions	Spain	distribution only; produced by La Pepa Films, Basque Films and Demasiados Enemigos AIE
December 25, 2024	Uninvited	Philippines	distribution only; produced by Mentorque Productions and Project 8 Projects

== 2025 ==
Release Date	Title	Country	Notes
January 17, 2025	Sunset Sunrise	Japan	
February 12, 2025	Ex Ex Lovers	Philippines	distribution only; produced by Project 8 Projects and Cornerstone Studios
February 13, 2025	Wunderschöner	Germany	co-production with Hellinger / Doll Filmproduktion
February 28, 2025	The Goldsmith's Secret	Spain	distribution only; produced by Nostromo Pictures
March 6, 2025	Uma Advogada Brilhante	Brazil	co-production with 44 Filmes; distributed by Downtown Filmes
March 7, 2025	Przepiękne!	Poland	co-production with Mazowiecki i Warszawski Fundusz Filmowy / Mazowiecki Instytut Kultury / Polski Instytut Sztuki Filmowej
March 21, 2025	Eraserheads: Combo on the Run	Philippines	distribution only; produced by DVent Pictures and WEU Event Management Services
March 27, 2025	E poi si vede	Italy	co-production with GreenBoo Production
May 16, 2025	Blank Canvas: My So-Called Artist's Journey	Japan	
June 13, 2025	Frontline	Japan	distribution only; produced by Kino Films & Lyonesse Pictures
June 18, 2025	Rodrigue in Love	France	distribution only; produced by Nolita Cinema and Newen Connect
July 24, 2025	Grand Prix Of Europe	Germany	co-production with Mack Magic
July 25, 2025	Vinci 2	Poland	co-production with Warsaw Documentary Film Studio
July 30, 2025	P77	Philippines	distribution only: produced by GMA Pictures, GMA Public Affairs and Clever Minds Inc.
August 8, 2025	About a Place in the Kinki Region	Japan	distribution only; produced by Kadokawa
August 9, 2025	Tom and Jerry: Forbidden Compass	China	co-production with China Film Group; distributed by Wuzhou Film Distribution
September 25, 2025	Amrum	Germany	co-production with Bombero International and Rialto Film
October 30, 2025	No Hit Wonder	Germany	co-production with Pantaleon Films, Erfttal Film, Koryphäen Film and Magic Media Production
November 7, 2025	Good Home	Poland	co-production with TVN Warner Bros. Discovery
November 19, 2025	Jean Valjean	France	distribution only; produced by Radar Films and France 3 Cinéma
November 28, 2025	Singular	Spain	distribution only; produced by White Leaf Producciones, Vidania Films and 61 North
November 28, 2025	Pillion	United Kingdom	co-distribution with Picturehouse Entertainment only; produced by Element Pictures, BBC Film and BFI
December 5, 2025	Wind Breaker	Japan	distribution only; produced by Flag Pictures
December 25, 2025	Primavera	Italy	distribution only; produced by Indigo Film and Moana Films

== 2026 ==
Release Date	Title	Country	Notes
January 9, 2026	All You Need Is Kill	Japan	co-production with Studio 4°C
January 15, 2026	La grazia	Italy	Italian distribution only; produced by, Fremantle, The Apartment Pictures and Numero 10
January 23, 2026	Idols	Spain	Spanish and Italian distribution only; co-production with 4 Cats Pictures, Anangu Grup and GreenBoo Production
January 29, 2026	Ach, diese Lücke, diese entsetzliche Lücke	Germany	co-production with Komplizen Film and Hellinger / Doll Filmproduktion
February 13, 2026	Gintama the Movie 2026: Yoshiwara in Flames	Japan	distribution only; produced by BN Pictures
March 20, 2026	Bitter Christmas	Spain	Spanish, Latin American and Italian distribution only; produced by El Deseo
May 13, 2026	Midnight Girls	Philippines	distribution only; produced by TJAV Productions Inc.
May 27, 2026	Mata	France	distribution only; produced by Marvelous Productions and Nolita Cinema
June 5, 2026	All That We Never Were	Spain	distribution only; produced by Bixagu Entertainment, LyO Media and Versus Entertainment
July 24, 2026	Three Too Many	Spain	distribution only; produced by León Cobarde Films
September 3, 2026	Ketticè	Italy	Italian distribution only; produced by Frenesy Film Company, The Apartment Pictures, MeMo Films, Piper Film, Rai Cinema, First Picture
September 16, 2026	EdJop	Philippines	distribution only; produced by The Mad Goats Inc., and Open Water Productions
September 16, 2026	The Intern	South Korea	co-production with Anthology Studio
September 24, 2026	Emil und die Detektive	Germany	co-production with UFA Fiction
October 30, 2026	Karateka	Spain	distribution only; produced by Atresmedia Cine, Apaches Entertainment and Colosé Producciones
November 5, 2026	Ghost Song	Germany	co-production with Bombero International and Rialto Film

== Upcoming ==
Release Date	Title	Country	Notes
January 8, 2027	Wild, Wild East	Poland	distribution only; produced by TVN Warner Bros. Discovery
January 14, 2027	My Years With You	Germany	co-production with Komplizen Film
April 16, 2027	Big Game Hunt	Spain	distribution only; produced by Movistar Plus+

== See also ==
- List of Warner Bros. theatrical animated feature films
- List of Warner Bros. films (2020–2029)
