= Peter Scriver =

Cree storyteller and filmmaker

Peter Scriver is a Cree storyteller and filmmaker from Shamattawa, Manitoba, most noted as codirector with his brother Seth Scriver of the 2025 documentary film Endless Cookie.

== Awards ==
Award / Film Festival	Date of ceremony	Category	Work	Result	Ref.
Annecy International Animation Film Festival	June 14, 2025	Contrechamp – Best Feature Film	Endless Cookie with Seth Scriver	Won	
Thessaloniki Documentary Festival	March 16, 2025	Film Forward – the Golden Alexander	Endless Cookie with Seth Scriver	Won	
Hot Docs Canadian International Documentary Festival	May 4, 2025	Rogers Audience Award	Endless Cookie with Seth Scriver	Won	
Director's Guild of Canada	November 8, 2025	Jean-Marc Vallée DGC Discovery Award	Endless Cookie with Seth Scriver	Longlisted	
Director's Guild of Canada	November 8, 2025	DGC Allan King Award for Best Documentary Film	Endless Cookie with Seth Scriver	Nominated	
Boston Society of Film Critics	December 14, 2025	Best Animated Film	Endless Cookie with Seth Scriver	Won	
Film Independent Spirit Awards	February 15, 2026	Best Documentary Feature	Endless Cookie with Seth Scriver, Daniel Bekerman, Alex Ordanis, Jason Ryle, Chris Yurkovich	Nominated	
Toronto Film Critics Association	March 2, 2026	Rogers Best Canadian Documentary	Endless Cookie with Seth Scriver	Won	
Toronto Film Critics Association	March 2, 2026	Best Animated Film	Endless Cookie with Seth Scriver	Won	
Anifilm	May 10, 2026	Best Feature Film for Adults	Endless Cookie with Seth Scriver	Won	
Canadian Screen Awards	May 31, 2026	Best Feature Length Documentary	Endless Cookie with Seth Scriver, Daniel Bekerman, Alex Ordanis, Chris Yurkovich, Jason Ryle, Neil Mathieson	Won	
