= Falling (2020 film) =

2020 drama film by Viggo Mortensen (directorial debut)

- Theatrical release poster
- Directed by: Viggo Mortensen
- Written by: Viggo Mortensen
- Produced by: Viggo Mortensen; Daniel Bekerman; Chris Curling
- Starring: Lance Henriksen; Viggo Mortensen; Terry Chen; Sverrir Guðnason; Hannah Gross; Laura Linney
- Cinematography: Marcel Zyskind
- Edited by: Ronald Sanders
- Music by: Viggo Mortensen; Buckethead; Skating Polly
- Production companies: Scythia Films; Zephyr Films; Perceval Pictures; Ingenious Media; Lip Sync Productions; HanWay Films
- Distributed by: Modern Films (United Kingdom); Mongrel Media (Canada)
- Release dates: January 31, 2020 (Sundance); December 4, 2020 (United Kingdom); February 5, 2021 (Canada)
- Running time: 112 minutes
- Countries: Canada; United Kingdom
- Language: English
- Box office: $974,268

Falling is a 2020 drama film written and directed by Viggo Mortensen in his feature directorial debut. The film stars Mortensen as John Peterson, a middle-aged gay man whose homophobic father Willis (Lance Henriksen) starts to exhibit symptoms of dementia, forcing him to sell the family farm and move to Los Angeles to live with John and his husband Eric (Terry Chen). The film's cast also includes Sverrir Gudnason, Laura Linney, Hannah Gross and David Cronenberg.

It premiered at the Sundance Film Festival on January 31, 2020. Modern Films released it in the United Kingdom on December 4, 2020. Quiver Distribution and Mongrel Media released it in the United States and Canada on February 5, 2021.

== Premise ==
John lives with his husband Eric in California, far from the traditional rural life he left behind years ago. His father, Willis, a headstrong man from a bygone era, lives alone on the isolated farm where John grew up. Willis's mind is declining, so John brings him west, hoping he and his sister, Sarah, can help their father find a home closer to them. Their best intentions ultimately run up against Willis's stubborn refusal to change his way of life in any way.

== Cast ==
- Lance Henriksen as Willis Peterson
  - Sverrir Guðnason as Young Willis Peterson
- Viggo Mortensen as John Peterson
- Terry Chen as Eric Peterson
- Hannah Gross as Gwen Peterson
- Laura Linney as Sarah Peterson

Filmmaker David Cronenberg, a frequent collaborator of Mortensen's, as well as the director's son Henry, have cameos as Willis' proctologist and the local deputy, respectively.

== Production ==
In October 2018, it was announced Viggo Mortensen would star in the film, alongside Lance Henriksen, Sverrir Guðnason, and directing from a screenplay he wrote. Mortensen and Daniel Bekerman served as the producers on the film under their Scythia Films banner. In March 2019, Laura Linney, Hannah Gross and Terry Chen joined the cast of the film.

Mortensen had not originally intended to play the lead role in the film himself, but found that since there were virtually no other major stars in the cast, committing to act in the film was the only way he was able to secure production funding.

Though not an autobiographical piece, Mortensen was influenced by feelings from his upbringing. One of the first scenes of the movie where Mortensen's character shoots a duck as a young boy and decides to keep the dead bird as a pet actually happened to him as a child.

=== Filming ===
Principal photography began in March 2019. Filming took place in Los Angeles and Northern Ontario.

== Release ==
It premiered at the Sundance Film Festival on January 31, 2020. It screened at the 2020 Toronto International Film Festival in September. It was released in the United Kingdom on December 4, 2020, by Modern Films. In December 2020, Quiver Distribution acquired U.S. distribution rights to the film and set it for a February 5, 2021, release. It was released in Canada on February 5, 2021.

== Reception ==
The film has a rating of 67% on Rotten Tomatoes based on 96 reviews and an average of 6.3/10. The website's critics consensus reads: "As messy and complex as the relationship at its center, Falling's repetitive nature can be taxing, but its heart is clearly in the right place." Metacritic reports a score of 66 out of 100 based on 15 critic reviews, indicating "generally favorable" reviews.

It won the 2020 Sebastiane Award and the award for Outstanding Achievement in Picture Editing from the Directors Guild of Canada, and received five Canadian Screen Award nominations at the 9th Canadian Screen Awards in 2021, for Best Actor (Henriksen), Best Art Direction or Production Design (Carol Spier), Best Costume Design (Anne Dixon), Best Editing (Ronald Sanders) and Best Casting (Deirdre Bowen).
