= The Quinta's Ghost =

2025 Spanish animation film

- Promotional poster
- Spanish: El fantasma de la Quinta
- Directed by: James A. Castillo
- Written by: Julio A. Serrano; James A. Castillo
- Produced by: Raul Rocha; James A. Castillo
- Starring: Maribel Verdú
- Cinematography: Mario de Dios
- Edited by: Emily Killick
- Music by: Carlos R. Rodriguez
- Production companies: Martirio films; Illusorium
- Release date: 7 June 2025 (Tribeca Film Festival)
- Running time: 17 minutes
- Country: Spain
- Language: Spanish

The Quinta's Ghost (Spanish: El fantasma de la Quinta) is a 2025 Spanish animated horror short film based on the Francisco de Goya's Black Paintings created on the walls of his home, La Quinta del Sordo in 1819. James A. Castillo, the director, used virtual reality tools to recreate two-century-old story.

The film features voice acting by Maribel Verdú, and had its World Premiere in the Shorts section at the Tribeca Film Festival on 7 June 2025.

The Quinta's Ghost was shortlisted for the 98th Academy Awards in the category of Best Animated Short Film.

== Summary ==
Set in 1819, the story follows an aging and weary Francisco de Goya, Spanish romantic painter and printmaker, as he withdraws to his home, La Quinta del Sordo, seeking isolation and time to work. During this period of seclusion, he becomes seriously ill and begins experiencing disturbing visions linked to his past. As his condition worsens, Goya responds by creating the series now known as the Black Paintings, covering the walls of his house in an effort to confront and dispel these haunting memories. The process pushes him to the edge of his physical and mental limits.

== Voice cast ==
- Maribel Verdú

== Release ==
The Quinta's Ghost had its World Premiere at the Tribeca Film Festival on 7 June 2025 in Shorts: Animated Shorts Curated By Whoopi G.

It was presented in the 21st Annual HollyShorts Film Festival 2025 on 11 August 2025.

It was screened in the Anima't section at the 58th Sitges Film Festival on 12 October 2025.

In June 2026, it was screened at the 2026 Annecy International Animation Film Festival in official Short films section.

== Accolades ==
Award	Date of ceremony	Category	Recipient(s)	Result	Ref.
Sitges Film Festival	18 October 2025	Méliès d'Argent Award for the Best Short Film	The Quinta's Ghost	Won	
Molins Horror Film Festival	16 November 2025	Best Screenplay	James A. Castillo and Julio Serrano	Won	

== See also ==
- List of submissions for the Academy Award for Best Animated Short Film
