= Toronto Film Critics Association Award for Best Animated Film =

Canadian film award

The Toronto Film Critics Association Award for Best Animated Film is one of the annual awards given by the Toronto Film Critics Association.

== Winners ==
=== 2000s ===
Year	Winner	Director(s)	Ref
2003	Finding Nemo	Andrew Stanton	
2004	The Triplets of Belleville (Les triplettes de Belleville)	Sylvain Chomet	
2005	Wallace & Gromit: The Curse of the Were-Rabbit	Steve Box, Nick Park	
2006	Happy Feet	George Miller	
2006	Over the Hedge	Tim Johnson, Karey Kirkpatrick	
2006	A Scanner Darkly	Richard Linklater	
2007	Ratatouille	Brad Bird	
2007	Paprika	Satoshi Kon	
2007	The Simpsons Movie	David Silverman	
2008	WALL-E	Andrew Stanton	
2008	Kung Fu Panda	John Stevenson, Mark Osborne	
2008	Persepolis	Marjane Satrapi, Vincent Paronnaud	
2008	Waltz with Bashir	Ari Folman	
2009	Fantastic Mr. Fox	Wes Anderson	
2009	Coraline	Henry Selick	
2009	Up	Pete Docter	

=== 2010s ===
Year	Winner	Director(s)	Ref
2010	How to Train Your Dragon	Chris Sanders, Dean DeBlois	
2010	Despicable Me	Chris Renaud, Pierre Coffin	
2010	Toy Story 3	Lee Unkrich	
2011	The Adventures of Tintin: The Secret of the Unicorn	Steven Spielberg	
2011	Puss in Boots	Chris Miller	
2011	Rango	Gore Verbinski	
2012	ParaNorman	Sam Fell, Chris Butler	
2012	Brave	Mark Andrews, Brenda Chapman	
2012	Frankenweenie	Tim Burton	
2013	The Wind Rises	Hayao Miyazaki	
2013	The Croods	Chris Sanders, Kirk DeMicco	
2013	Frozen	Chris Buck, Jennifer Lee	
2014	The Tale of the Princess Kaguya	Isao Takahata	
2014	Big Hero 6	Don Hall, Chris Williams	
2014	How to Train Your Dragon 2	Dean DeBlois	
2014	The Lego Movie	Phil Lord, Christopher Miller	
2015	Shaun the Sheep Movie	Mark Burton, Richard Starzak	
2015	Anomalisa	Charlie Kaufman, Duke Johnson	
2015	Inside Out	Pete Docter	
2016	Zootopia	Byron Howard, Rich Moore	
2016	Kubo and the Two Strings	Travis Knight	
2016	The Red Turtle	Michael Dudok de Wit	
2017	The Breadwinner	Nora Twomey	
2017	Coco	Lee Unkrich	
2017	Window Horses	Ann Marie Fleming	
2018	Isle of Dogs	Wes Anderson	
2018	Ralph Breaks the Internet	Rich Moore, Phil Johnston	
2018	Spider-Man: Into the Spider-Verse	Bob Persichetti, Peter Ramsey, Rodney Rothman	
2019	Missing Link	Chris Butler	
2019	Frozen 2	Chris Buck, Jennifer Lee	
2019	How to Train Your Dragon: The Hidden World	Dean DeBlois	
2019	Toy Story 4	Josh Cooley	

=== 2020s ===
Year	Winner	Director(s)	Ref
2020	Wolfwalkers	Tomm Moore and Ross Stewart	
2020	Soul	Pete Docter	
2020	The Willoughbys	Kris Pearn	
2021	Flee	Jonas Poher Rasmussen	
2021	Encanto	Jared Bush, Byron Howard	
2021	The Mitchells vs. the Machines	Mike Rianda	
2022	Turning Red	Domee Shi	
2022	Guillermo del Toro's Pinocchio	Guillermo del Toro	
2022	Marcel the Shell with Shoes On	Dean Fleischer Camp	
2023	Robot Dreams	Pablo Berger	
2023	The Boy and the Heron	Hayao Miyazaki	
2023	Spider-Man: Across the Spider-Verse	Joaquim Dos Santos, Kemp Powers	
2024	Flow	Gints Zilbalodis	
2024	Memoir of a Snail	Adam Elliot	
2024	The Wild Robot	Chris Sanders	
2025	Endless Cookie	Seth Scriver, Peter Scriver	
2025	KPop Demon Hunters	Chris Appelhans, Maggie Kang	
2025	Space Cadet	Kid Koala	

== Multiple wins ==
- Wes Anderson - 2
- Chris Butler - 2
- Andrew Stanton - 2
