= James A. Castillo =

Spanish animation director and designer

- Born: Madrid, Spain
- Occupations: Animation director; Designer
- Years active: 2012–present

James A. Castillo is a Spanish animation director and designer. He is known for directing the virtual reality experience Madrid Noir (2021) and the animated short film The Quinta’s Ghost (2025).

== Career ==
His feature film credits include character design and art department work on The Mitchells vs. the Machines (2021) and Teenage Mutant Ninja Turtles: Mutant Mayhem (2023). He co-wrote and directed Madrid Noir (2021), an interactive virtual reality film produced by No Ghost and Atlas V that premiered at the Tribeca Festival.

Castillo directed The Quinta's Ghost (2025), an animated short film inspired by Francisco de Goya's Black Paintings that addresses themes of grief and mental health through elements of horror. The film features voice acting by Maribel Verdú, pioneered the use of virtual reality painting techniques, premiered at the Tribeca Festival, and was shortlisted for the Academy Awards.

== Selected filmography ==
Year	Title	Contribution	Note
2021	Madrid Noir	Director	VR film
2021	The Mitchells vs. the Machines	Character designer	
2023	Ozi: Voice of the Forest	Character designer	
2025	Smurfs	Visual development artist	
2025	The Quinta's Ghost	Director, writer, and producer	Short film

== Awards and nominations ==
Year	Result	Award	Category	Work	Ref.
2022	Won	Children's and Family Emmy Awards	Outstanding Interactive Media	Madrid Noir	
2022	Won	Webby Awards	Virtual & Remote: Immersive - Best Narrative Experience	Madrid Noir	
2025	Won	Sitges Film Festival	Méliès d'Argent: Best European Fantasy Genre Short Film	The Quinta's Ghost	
2025	Won	Molins Horror Film Festival	Best Screenplay	The Quinta's Ghost	
