= Endless Cookie =

2025 animated documentary film

- Theatrical release poster
- Directed by: Seth Scriver; Peter Scriver
- Written by: Seth Scriver; Peter Scriver
- Produced by: Daniel Bekerman; Alex Ordanis; Jason Ryle; Seth Scriver; Chris Yurkovich
- Starring: Seth Scriver; Peter Scriver
- Edited by: Sydney Cowper
- Animation by: Seth Scriber
- Production company: Scythia Films
- Distributed by: Mongrel Media, Obscured Releasing
- Release dates: January 25, 2025 (Sundance); June 13, 2025 (Canada)
- Running time: 98 minutes
- Country: Canada
- Language: English

Endless Cookie is a 2025 Canadian adult animated documentary film written and directed by Seth Scriver and Peter Scriver.

== Summary ==
The film centres on their experiences as half-brothers who share the same father, but whose relationship faced various complications as they were growing up, including a 16-year age gap and the fact that Peter's mother was a Cree member of the Shamattawa First Nation while Seth's mother was white.

== Production ==
Seth Scriver created Asphalt Watches in 2013. Daniel Bekerman, who founded Scythia Films, learned of Seth through Asphalt Watches and enjoyed the film. Bekerman became a producer for Endless Cookie and secured funding for it.

Seth, who is white, and his half-brother Peter, who is indigenous, started work on Endless Cookie, a film about their family's history, in 2016, at Peter's house in Shamattawa First Nation. They faced interruptions from the 7 children and 12 dogs in Peter's house, but Seth chose to incorporate them into the production. The thousands of miles in distance between Peter and Seth's houses made it so that Seth had to save up money or apply for travel grants in order to record Peter's stories. Peter's family was inexperienced with the microphone Seth gave them and sent 20 blank audio files to him at one point.

Telefilm Canada provided funding for the film and is featured in the film as a character. The National Film Board of Canada did not provide funding for the film, but is mentioned in it as the NFG (No fucking good).

Seth animated around 90% of the film over the course of nine years and Julian Gallese helped for two months. Animation was initially done using Adobe Flash 8, but Seth later switched to Adobe Animate and Adobe After Effects.

The story line about building a tipi was created in order to ground the audience in the world of the characters. A scene in which two car seats hear about the disproportionate incarceration of indigenous people was inspired by the Idle No More protest.

Adobe Premiere Pro was used to edit the film. Alex Ordanis and Sydney Cowper were the ones that assembled the large amount of footage into a coherent film according to Scriver. It was the first animated film that Cowper edited. Over two hours of animation was made for the film, but it was edited to 97 minutes. Cowper was aided by the film being animated as "if something was missing from a scene, Seth could just draw it in". Multiple stories, such as wolves luring pet dogs onto the ice in order to kill them or a kid showing a photograph of Bigfoot, were not included in the final version.

== Release ==
Endless Cookie premiered at the 2025 Sundance Film Festival as part of the World Cinema Documentary Competition on 25 January. At the Hot Docs Canadian International Documentary Festival it received the $50,000 prize from the Rogers Audience Award, and it was the opening film at the imagineNATIVE Film and Media Arts Festival. It was available online from 30 January to 2 February.

MAGNIFY was the sales agent for the global distribution rights and sold the theatrical distribution rights for the United States to Obscured Releasing. In Canada, it was released on 13 June 2025, and Obscured Releasing released the film in the United States on 5 December.

== Analysis ==
Chris Robinson, writing for Cartoon Brew, noted that the animation looked like a mix of South Park, Pee-wee's Playhouse, and the works of Gary Baseman (Teacher's Pet). Randall King noted in the Winnipeg Free Press that the animation was reminiscent of the art of Kim Deitch. Brad Wheeler stated in The Globe and Mail that Endless Cookie, like North of North and Inuktitut, did not show the life of indigenous people as an exotic sub-genre. Jacob Oller of The A.V. Club compared it to animations on Adult Swim and the works of Richard Scarry.

Seth listed Akira Toriyama, Apichatpong Weerasethakul, Juzo Itami, Stephen Chow, The Fugs, and Michael Hurley as his creative heroes.

== Reception ==
On the review aggregator website Rotten Tomatoes, 90% of 21 critics' reviews are positive. Metacritic, which uses a weighted average, assigned the film a score of 79 out of 100, based on seven critics, indicating "generally favorable" reviews.

Pat Mullen, writing for Point of View, praised the film's humour and eccentric animation. Carlos Aguilar, writing for Variety, wrote that Seth succeeded at showing the storytelling abilities of his brother and compared the structure and humour of the film to Adventure Time, Regular Show, and Rick and Morty. Jacob Oller gave the film a B rating in The A.V. Club. Robert Daniels, writing for The New York Times, praised the film's "rich oral history."

Seth stated that his favourite scene in the film was when Peter was interrupted while telling a story about being stuck in his own trap. Cowper stated that her favourite scene was one involving a character throwing chickens onto the streets of Kensington Market.

=== Accolades ===
Award / Film Festival	Date of ceremony	Category	Recipient(s)	Result	Ref.
Sundance Film Festival	January 23-February 2, 2025	World Cinema Dramatic Competition	Seth Scriver, Peter Scriver	Nominated	
Annecy International Animation Film Festival	14 June 2025	Contrechamp – Best Feature Film	Endless Cookie	Won	
Thessaloniki Documentary Festival	16 March 2025	Film Forward – the Golden Alexander	Endless Cookie	Won	
Hot Docs Canadian International Documentary Festival	4 May 2025	Rogers Audience Award	Endless Cookie	Won	
Director's Guild of Canada	8 November 2025	Jean-Marc Vallée DGC Discovery Award	Seth Scriver, Peter Scriver	Longlisted	
Director's Guild of Canada	8 November 2025	DGC Allan King Award for Best Documentary Film	Seth Scriver, Peter Scriver	Nominated	
Boston Society of Film Critics	December 14, 2025	Best Animated Film	Endless Cookie	Won	
Film Independent Spirit Awards	15 February 2026	Best Documentary Feature	Peter Scriver, Seth Scriver, Daniel Bekerman, Alex Ordanis, Jason Ryle, Chris Yurkovich	Nominated	
Toronto Film Critics Association	2 March 2026	Rogers Best Canadian Documentary	Seth Scriver, Peter Scriver	Won	
Toronto Film Critics Association	2 March 2026	Best Animated Film	Seth Scriver, Peter Scriver	Won	
Anifilm	10 May 2026	Best Feature Film for Adults	Endless Cookie	Won	
Canadian Screen Awards	31 May 2026	Best Feature Length Documentary	Seth Scriver, Peter Scriver, Daniel Bekerman, Alex Ordanis, Chris Yurkovich, Jason Ryle, Neil Mathieson	Won	
Canadian Screen Awards	31 May 2026	Best Sound Design in a Documentary	Andrew Zukerman	Won	

== Works cited ==
=== News ===
- "'Endless Cookie' wins $50,000 audience award at Hot Docs Festival". Toronto Star. 4 May 2025. Archived from the original on 15 June 2025.
- ""This Experience Really Drives Home the Idea of What a Passion Project Really Is": Editor Sydney Cowper on Endless Cookie". Filmmaker. 25 January 2025. Archived from the original on 15 June 2025.
- Aguilar, Carlos (1 February 2025). "'Endless Cookie' Review: Colorful Anecdotes About Indigenous Canadian Life Amuse in Wacky Animated Doc". Variety. Archived from the original on 15 June 2025.
- Braun, Liz (28 March 2025). "Hot Docs Documentary Festival Back and Ready to Rumble". Original Cin. Archived from the original on 15 June 2025.
- Carey, Matthew (24 January 2025). "'Endless Cookie' Set For Sundance Premiere: "Endearing Handcrafted Animated Hangout Film" About Half-Brothers – One Indigenous, One White". Deadline Hollywood. Archived from the original on 15 June 2025.
- Daniels, Robert (4 December 2025). "'Endless Cookie' Review: An Animated Family History". The New York Times.
- Gheciu, Alex (22 January 2025). "Animated doc by 2 brothers from Shamattawa, Man., to premiere at Sundance Film Festival". Canadian Broadcasting Corporation. Archived from the original on 15 June 2025.
- Gorber, Jason (27 January 2025). "Seth and Pete Scriver Take a Bite Out of Storytelling with Endless Cookie". Point of View. Archived from the original on 15 June 2025.
- King, Randall (13 June 2025). "Sweet bite of life". Winnipeg Free Press. Archived from the original on 16 June 2025.
- Lang, Brent (4 February 2025). "Animated Documentary 'Endless Cookie' Sells to New Distribution Company Obscured Releasing (EXCLUSIVE)". Variety. Archived from the original on 6 December 2025.
- Lang, Brent (4 February 2025). "Daniel Bekerman on the Challenges of Producing 'The Apprentice' and His New Sundance Movies 'Endless Cookie' and 'The Wedding Banquet'". Variety. Archived from the original on 16 June 2025.
- Laskaris, Sam (13 June 2025). "Endless Cookie starts theatrical run across Canada". Windspeaker. Archived from the original on 15 June 2025.
- Lattanzio, Ryan (3 December 2025). "Spirit Award Nominees Include 'Sorry, Baby,' 'Peter Hujar's Day,' 'Train Dreams,' 'Twinless,' and 'The Plague'". IndieWire. Archived from the original on 6 December 2025.
- Mullen, Pat (28 January 2025). "Endless Cookie Review: What a Great Ball of Yarns". Point of View. Archived from the original on 15 June 2025.
- Oller, Jacob (29 January 2025). "Sundance 2025 shows off its wild and predictable sides with genre gambles and straightforward indies". The A.V. Club. Archived from the original on 16 June 2025.
- Pruitt, Asha (23 January 2025). "Scriver Brothers Balance Surrealism and Authenticity in Documentary Endless Cookie". SLUG. Archived from the original on 16 June 2025.
- Robinson, Chris (11 June 2025). "Canadian Indie Animated Features On The Rise: 'Space Cadet,' 'Death Does Not Exist,' 'Endless Cookie'". Cartoon Brew. Archived from the original on 14 June 2025.
- Roxborough, Scott (14 June 2025). "Natalie Portman-Produced French Animated Film 'Arco' Wins Annecy". The Hollywood Reporter. Archived from the original on 16 June 2025.
- Sokic, Nicholas (8 May 2025). "ImagineNATIVE sets programming for 25th anniversary". Playback. Archived from the original on 15 June 2025.
- Thiessen, Connie (18 September 2025). "DGC unveils 2025 Jean-Marc Vallée DGC Discovery Award long list". Broadcast Dialogue. Archived from the original on 6 December 2025.
- Thiessen, Connie (18 September 2025). "DGC unveils film, doc nominees; Discovery Award short list". Broadcast Dialogue. Archived from the original on 6 December 2025.
- Wheeler, Brad (13 June 2025). "Animated film Endless Cookie tackles racism, residential schools and Canadian smugness with brotherly love". The Globe and Mail. Archived from the original on 13 June 2025.

=== Web ===
- Crucchiola, Jordan (26 January 2025). ""Endless Cookie" Is an Animated Documentary Unlike Any Other". Sundance Institute. Archived from the original on 16 June 2025.
- Economou, Vassilis (17 March 2025). "Coexistence, My Ass! wins big at the 27th Thessaloniki International Documentary Festival". Cineuropa. Archived from the original on 16 June 2025.
- Gallina, Michelle (25 January 2025). "Sundance 2025: "Endless Cookie" is an animated look at two half-brothers' complicated relationship". Adobe Inc. Archived from the original on 15 June 2025.
- Spicer, Lucy (17 January 2025). "Give Me the Backstory: Get to Know Seth and Peter Scriver, the Filmmakers Behind "Endless Cookie"". Sundance Film Festival. Archived from the original on 19 April 2025.
