= Luger (2025 film) =

- Festival poster
- Directed by: Bruno Martín
- Screenplay by: Bruno Martín; Santiago Taboada
- Produced by: José Luis Rancaño; Bruno Martín
- Starring: David Sainz; Mario Mayo
- Cinematography: David Hebrero
- Edited by: Bruno Martín
- Music by: Leví Star
- Production companies: La Dalia Films; The Go Betweeners; Bruno Martín; Far Seas Productions
- Release dates: 20 September 2025 (Fantastic Fest); 17 January 2026 (Spain)
- Country: Spain
- Language: Spanish

Luger is a 2025 Spanish independent action thriller film directed by Bruno Martín in his debut feature starring David Sainz and Mario Mayo.

== Plot ==
Set in Madrid, in the fictional industrial estate of 'Santos 117', the plot follows fixers Rafa and Toni as they find a World War II relic. Betrayals and escalating violence ensue.

== Cast ==
- David Sainz as Rafa
- Mario Mayo as Toni
- Ana Turpin as Ángela
- Ramiro Alonso as Jacinto
- Ángel Acero as Juan
- Mauricio Morales as Fede
- Bruno Martín as Charly

== Production ==
The film is a La Dalia Films, Bruno Martín, The Go Betweeners, and Far Seas Productions production with the collaboration of Futuro Hotel.

== Release ==
Prior to Luger's premiere, Filmax acquired international sales rights to the film. For its world premiere, the film made it to the 'Next Wave' slate of the 2025 Fantastic Fest. Its festival run also included selections for screenings at the Strasbourg European Fantastic Film Festival (for its European premiere) and the 58th Sitges Film Festival (for its Spanish premiere). Distributed by Filmax, the film was programmed a limited theatrical release in select Spanish cities, starting on 17 January 2026 in Madrid.

== Reception ==
Adrian Torres of The Pitch wrote that "with its smart writing, richly developed characters, and visceral action scenes", Luger "warrants a spot on any film lover's must-watch list".

== See also ==
- List of Spanish films of 2026
