= Singular (film) =

- Theatrical release poster
- Directed by: Alberto Gastesi
- Screenplay by: Alberto Gastesi; Alex Merino
- Produced by: Sergy Moreno; Alejandra Arróspide
- Starring: Patricia López Arnaiz; Javier Rey; Miguel Iriarte
- Cinematography: Esteban Ramos
- Edited by: Javi Frutos
- Music by: Ana Arsuaga; Jon Aguirrezabalaga
- Production companies: White Leaf Producciones; Vidania Films; 61 North
- Distributed by: Warner Bros. Pictures
- Release dates: 12 October 2025 (Sitges); 28 November 2025 (Spain)
- Running time: 104 minutes
- Countries: Spain; Finland
- Language: Spanish

Singular is a 2025 psychological thriller film directed by Alberto Gastesi and co-written by Alex Merino. It stars Patricia López Arnaiz and Javier Rey alongside newcomer Miguel Iriarte.

The film had its world premiere at the 58th Sitges Film Festival on 12 October 2025 ahead of its Spanish theatrical release by Warner Bros. Pictures on 28 November 2025.

== Plot ==
Re-acquainting with her former partner Martín in an isolated summer house near a lake after 12 years, Artificial Intelligence specialist Diana is upended by the appearance of Andrea, a mysterious young man who bears a striking resemblance to Diana's and Martín's deceased child.

== Cast ==
- Patricia López Arnaiz as Diana
- Javier Rey as Martín
- Miguel Iriarte as Andrea

== Production ==
The project won the 5th Sitges Pitchbox prize at the 2019 Sitges Film Festival valued in €5,000 for its development. Gastesi stated that he approached the project as "a playful experience through psychological thriller and science fiction, playing with their tropes to turn them upside down".

The film was produced by White Leaf Producciones and Vidania Films production, with the participation of EiTB and RTVE, and backing from ICAA, the Basque government, the Madrid regional administration, and Ayuntamiento de Madrid. Finland's outfit 61 North also joined as a production company. Esteban Ramos worked as director of photography, using an Arri Alexa 35 camera and Cooke S4 lenses.

Shooting locations in the Madrid region and the Basque Country included Rascafría, Legutio, and San Sebastián. Jon Aguirrezabalaga (Zabala Music) and Ana Arsuaga (Verde Prato) scored the film. Javi Frutos took over film editing.

== Release ==
Singular premiered on 12 October 2025 at the 58th Sitges Film Festival. It is scheduled to be released theatrically in Spain on 28 November 2025 by Warner Bros. Pictures.

== See also ==
- List of Spanish films of 2025
