= List of Care Bears films =

Care Bears
- Directed by: Various
- Starring: Nelvana films: Billie Mae Richards; Dan Hennessey; Hadley Kay; Cree Summer; Jim Henshaw; Susan Roman; Rob Tinkler; Julie Lemieux; Stevie Vallance; Andrew Sabiston; Scott McCord; Stephanie Beard; SD Entertainment films: Ashleigh Ball; Tabitha St. Germain; Scott McNeil; Ian James Corlett; Tracey Moore; Anna Cummer
- Production companies: Nelvana (1985–1987, 2004, 2005); SD Entertainment (2007, 2010)
- Countries: United States; Canada
- Language: English

The Care Bears are a group of characters created by the American Greetings company in 1981. Since 1985, they have appeared in nine animated feature films. The first three, made by the Canadian company Nelvana during the mid-1980s, were traditionally cel-animated; all subsequent entries (from 2004 onward) have been in CGI. Nelvana produced the first five films, while Los Angeles-based SD Entertainment has made another four (starting with Care Bears: Oopsy Does It! in 2007).

A new Care Bears animated film has been in development since 2025 and Josh Greenbaum was hired to direct a film for Warner Bros. Pictures. Good Fear Content's Chris Bender and Jake Weiner, along with GoldDay's John Francis Daley and Jonathan Goldstein, are attached to produce while Cloudco's Sean Gorman and Daniel Barnes serve as executive producers. Writers Amos Vernon and Nunzio Randazzo joined to the project in the following year.

== Films ==
=== Nelvana ===
Title	Release date (North America)	Distributor (North America)	Release type	Source
The Care Bears Movie	March 24, 1985 (Washington, D.C.); March 29, 1985	The Samuel Goldwyn Company (U.S.); Astral Films, Criterion Pictures Corporation (Canada)	Theatrical	
Care Bears Movie II: A New Generation	March 7, 1986 (limited); March 21, 1986	Columbia Pictures	Theatrical	
The Care Bears Adventure in Wonderland	August 7, 1987	Cineplex Odeon Films	Theatrical	
Care Bears: Journey to Joke-a-lot	October 5, 2004	Lions Gate Home Entertainment (North America); Universal Studios Home Video (Overseas)	Direct-to-DVD	
The Care Bears' Big Wish Movie	October 18, 2005	Lions Gate Home Entertainment	Direct-to-DVD	

=== SD Entertainment ===
Title	Release date (North America)	Distributor (North America)	Release type	Source
Care Bears: Oopsy Does It!	August 4, 2007 (limited)	Kidtoon Films	Theatrical	
Care Bears: To the Rescue	April 3, 2010 (limited)	Kidtoon Films	Theatrical	
Care Bears: The Giving Festival	November 2, 2010	Lions Gate Home Entertainment	Direct-to-DVD	
Care Bears: Share Bear Shines	November 6, 2010 (limited)	Kidtoon Films	Theatrical (U.S.); Direct-to-DVD (Australia)	(Note: Share Bear Shines premiered on DVD in Australia, eight months ahead of Kidtoons' U.S. release.)

== Cast ==
Character
Character	The Care Bears Movie	Care Bears Movie II: A New Generation	The Care Bears Adventure in Wonderland	Care Bears: Journey to Joke-a-lot	The Care Bears Big Wish Movie	Care Bears: Oopsy Does It!	Care Bears: To the Rescue	Care Bears: The Giving Festival	Care Bears: Share Bear Shines
The ten original Bears
Tenderheart Bear	Billie Mae Richards	Billie Mae Richards	Jim Henshaw	Andrew Sabiston	Andrew Sabiston	Matt Hill	Matt Hill	Matt Hill	Matt Hill
Grumpy Bear	Bob Dermer	Bob Dermer	Bob Dermer	Robert Tinkler	Robert Tinkler	Scott McNeil	Scott McNeil	Scott McNeil	Scott McNeil
Wish Bear	Janet-Laine Green	Janet-Laine Green		Stephanie Beard	Stephanie Beard	Chiara Zanni	Chiara Zanni	Chiara Zanni	Chiara Zanni
Friend Bear	Eva Almos	Eva Almos	Eva Almos	Catherine Disher	Catherine Disher	Shannon Chan-Kent	Shannon Chan-Kent	Shannon Chan-Kent	Shannon Chan-Kent
Good Luck Bear	Marla Lukofsky	Dan Hennessey	Marla Lukofsky	Susan Roman	Susan Roman	Samuel Vincent	Samuel Vincent	Samuel Vincent	Samuel Vincent
Funshine Bear	Patricia Black	Patricia Black		Julie Lemieux	Julie Lemieux	Ian James Corlett	Ian James Corlett	Ian James Corlett	Ian James Corlett
Love-a-lot Bear	Georgia Engel			Angela Maiorano	Angela Maiorano	Terri Hawkes	Terri Hawkes	Terri Hawkes	Terri Hawkes
Birthday Bear	Melleny Brown								
Bedtime Bear	Gloria Figura	Gloria Figura	Gloria Figura	Scott McCord	Scott McCord	Richard Ian Cox	Richard Ian Cox	Richard Ian Cox	Richard Ian Cox
Cheer Bear	Melleny Brown	Melleny Brown	Melleny Brown	Sunday Muse	Sunday Muse	Tabitha St. Germain	Tabitha St. Germain	Tabitha St. Germain	Tabitha St. Germain
