= Boston Society of Film Critics Award for Best Animated Film =

Annual US film award

The Boston Society of Film Critics Award for Best Animated Film is one of the annual awards given by the Boston Society of Film Critics since 2008.

== Winners ==
=== 2000s ===
- 2008: Wall-E
- 2009: Up

=== 2010s ===
- 2010: Toy Story 3
- 2011: Rango
- 2012: Frankenweenie
- 2013: The Wind Rises
- 2014: The Tale of the Princess Kaguya
- 2015: Anomalisa
- 2016: Tower
- 2017: Coco
- 2018: Isle of Dogs
- 2019: I Lost My Body

=== 2020s ===
- 2020: The Wolf House
- 2021: Flee
- 2022: Turning Red
- 2023: The Boy and the Heron
- 2024: Flow
- 2025: Endless Cookie

== See also ==
- Academy Award for Best Animated Feature
