= Scythia Films =

Canadian entertainment company

Scythia Films Inc.
- Company type: Private
- Industry: Entertainment
- Founders: Daniel Bekerman
- Headquarters: Toronto, Canada
- Key people: Daniel Bekermen (CEO)
- Products: Motion pictures
- Services: Film production; Television programs
- Number of employees: 11-50 (2020)
- Website: scythiafilms.com

Scythia Films Inc. is a leading Canadian independent entertainment company founded by Daniel Bekerman in 2008, and based in Toronto.

== Projects ==
Scythia Films jointly produced Robert Eggers' 2015 period horror The Witch with several other production companies.

In 2017, it was announced that Scythia Films along with Stellar Citizens would launch a development fund to produce between five and seven film and television projects. The first of these was reported to be an adaptation of Mark Vonnegut's The Eden Express: A Memoir of Insanity.

The company also jointly produced the 2018 political thriller Backstabbing for Beginners, starring Theo James and Ben Kingsley.

Scythia Films' produced the directorial debut of actor Viggo Mortensen, Falling, with five other companies. Falling had its world premiere at the 2020 Sundance Film Festival. It was intended to screen at the 2020 Cannes Film Festival until the festival was delayed because of the COVID-19 pandemic in France. It was shown at the 2020 Toronto International Film Festival.

Since 2008, Scythia Films has been a Service Producer and Producer on over 40 feature films.

The Apprentice, produced by Scythia Films, premiered at The Cannes Film Festival in 2024, and screened at Telluride and TIFF later that year.
