= Daniel Bekerman =

Canadian film producer

Daniel Bekerman is a Canadian film producer, who is the founder and president of Scythia Films. He is most noted as producer of The Apprentice, which won the Canadian Screen Award for Best Motion Picture at the 13th Canadian Screen Awards in 2025.

== Filmography ==
- Toronto Stories - 2008
- You Are Here - 2010
- Citizen Gangster - 2011
- Bang Bang Baby - 2014
- The Witch - 2015
- The People Garden - 2016
- Kayak to Klemtu - 2017
- Tomato Red - 2017
- Rememory - 2017
- State Like Sleep - 2018
- 22 Chaser - 2018
- Come to Daddy - 2019
- The Prodigy - 2019
- Percy - 2020
- Falling - 2020
- Close to You - 2023
- It's a Wonderful Knife - 2023
- The Apprentice - 2024
- Longing - 2024
- Endless Cookie - 2025
- I, Object - 2026
- Permanent Damage - 2026
