= Hearnshaw (surname) =

Hearnshaw is a surname. Notable people with the surname include:

- Eric Hearnshaw (1893–1967), Australian politician
- F. J. C. Hearnshaw (1869–1946), English historian
- L. S. Hearnshaw (1907–1991), English psychologist and son of F. J. C.
- John Hearnshaw (born 1946), New Zealand astronomer and son of L. S.
- Sue Hearnshaw (born 1961), British athlete
- Philip Hearnshaw (1952–2012), Australian filmmaker

== See also ==
- 5207 Hearnshaw, asteroid
