= 59th Sitges Film Festival =

2026 edition of Spanish film festival

- Official poster, evoking the bloodbath of 1976 American supernatural horror film Carrie
- Opening film: Found Alive by Carlota Pereda
- Closing film: Wicker by Alex Huston Fischer and Eleanor Wilson
- Location: Sitges, Catalonia, Spain
- Founded: 1968
- Awards: The Kong
- Hosted by: The Foundation Board
- Artistic director: Ángel Sala
- No. of films: 442
- Festival date: Opening: 8 October 2026; Closing: 18 October 2026
- Website: sitgesfilmfestival.com/en

Sitges Film Festival
- 2027 2025

The 59th Sitges International Fantastic Film Festival of Catalonia took place from 8 to 18 October 2026, in Sitges, Catalonia, Spain. The festival opened with American thriller film Found Alive by Carlota Pereda, the fourth time a female director has opened the festival. In opening gala, hosted by the artistic director of the Festival Ángel Sala, David Gregory, American television personality was presented with Industry Award.

The winners of the Festival were announced on 17 October 2026. French-Belgian body horror film Species (Sanguine) directed by Marion Le Coroller, won the award for Best Film, while Joko Anwar was awarded Best Director for his film Ghost in the Cell. Species is the fifth film directed by a woman to receive the top award at Sitges.

At the closing of the festival Amy Irving, American actress and singer was honoured with Grand Honorary Award followed by the screening of romantic fantasy comedy film Wicker by Alex Huston Fischer and Eleanor Wilson.

== Festival overview ==
In this edition of the festival, a tribute will be paid to Brian De Palma, the director of 1976 American supernatural horror film Carrie, on its 50th anniversary of release.

American filmmaker, Robert Eggers will receive the Time Machine Award, in "recognition of an outstanding career that has made a decisive contribution to the rejuvenation of contemporary fantastic and horror cinema". Spanish actress Bárbara Rey will be honored with the Nosferatu Award.

=== Poster ===
On 15 May, in the Fantastic Pavilion at the Cannes Film Festival’s Marché du Film, artistic director Ángel Sala and Mònica Garcia Massagué presented the official poster of the Festival. The poster featuring a teenage female figure covered in "glittery red strips", evokes the bloodbath the protagonist of 1976 American supernatural horror film Carrie suffers during the film's climax. With this the festival is highlighting the 50th anniversary of the teen-horror film, one that shaped the 1970s and 1980s by introducing stories about prom nights, bullying, and psychic powers, beginning with Carrie.

=== FIPRESCI jury ===
In June 2026, the Sitges Film Festival and the International Federation of Film Critics announced the establishment of a three-member FIPRESCI jury awarding a FIPRESCI Award among the 'Official Fantàstic In-Competition Selection' titles beginning with the 2026 festival edition.

=== 2026 Lineup ===
The complete programme of 2026 edition was revealed on 23 September.

=== MaestrAs ===
The Program Dedicated to Pioneering Women will be attended by following women, the top-tier female creators from the fantastic and horror genre landscape:

- K. J. Relth-Miller
- Bárbara Rey, Spanish film and television actress
- Adrienne Barbeau, American actress and author
- Julie Corman, American film producer
- Virginie Bourdin, art and visual developer
- Anna Biller, American filmmaker

=== Surprise film ===
Freaks Part II was screened as the surprise film on 17 October 2026.

== Screening venues ==
- Hotel Meliá, Sitges Auditorium
- Sala Tramuntana Meliá
- Cinema Casino Prado
- Cinema Escorxador
- Sala Llevant
- Mercat Vell

== Juries ==
The juries consists of the following members:

=== Main competition ===
- Giona A. Nazzaro, artistic director of the Locarno Film Festival and critic specializing
- Valeria Vegas, Spanish transgender journalist, essayist, writer, documentary filmmaker and producer
- Andy Starke, British film and television producer
- Alex Litvak, screenwriter and producer
- Merry Colomer, producer at Morena Films

=== Noves Visions ===
- J. D. Fernández Molero, Peruvian filmmaker
- Jeff Goodwin, veteran makeup artist and special effects expert
- Gabriela Martí, director of the Rizoma Festival

=== Short films ===
- Fernando de Felipe, professor and film screenwriter ,
- Mihai Chirilov, Romanian film critic, and the artistic director of the Transilvania International Film Festival
- Nicole McControversy, Beyond Fest programmer

=== Méliès d'Or ===
- Fred Neuen, president of the Luxembourg Film Academy
- Shaun Sutton, executive at Blumhouse
- Inga Headland, international project consultant

=== Sitges Documenta / Òrbita ===
- Pablo Guisa, producer and CEO of Grupo Mórbido
- Bob Murawski, American film editor and distributor
- Natasha Durán, specialist and founder of Hulahoop

=== Anima't ===
- Hugh Welchman, British filmmaker, screenwriter, and producer.
- Chelo Loureiro, Spanish film producer and director specializing in animated films
- Mary Yanko, Ukrainian director and visual artist

=== Brigadoon ===
- Sabina Pujol, the director of programming for the B-Retina Festival
- Silvia Superstar, actress and musician
- José Luis Salvador Estébenez, journalist and film critic

=== FIPRESCI Jury ===
- Raquel Abad
- Eirik Bull
- Emanuele Di Nicola

=== Carnet Jove ===
- Anna Rodellas Gràcia
- Hug Banqué Majó
- Naomi Lladó Quer
- Nerea Itsaso, and
- Noah Aznar Canorea

=== SGAE Nova Autoria ===
- Mikel Gurrea, director and screenwriter
- Laia Aguilar, writer and screenwriter
- Roque Baños, Spanish composer and director

=== Josefina Molina Award ===
- Mònica Garcia i Massagué, General Manager of the Sitges Foundation – International Fantastic Film Festival of Catalonia;
- Violeta Kovacsics, Catalan film critic and professor at the Escola Superior de Cinema i Audiovisuals de Catalunya
- Elisa Puerto Aubel, screenwriter, director, and script consultant
- Óscar Aibar, Spanish film director, comic book writer, television director, and author

== Official sections ==
The Official Selections have a wide mix of genre films, horror, sci‑fi, fantasy, thrillers, and blends of all these.

=== Opening film ===
English title	Original title	Director(s)	Production country(ies)
Found Alive		Carlota Pereda	Spain, United States

=== Closing film ===
English title	Original title	Director(s)	Production country(ies)
Wicker		Alex Huston Fischer and Eleanor Wilson	United Kingdom, United States, Australia

=== Secció Oficial Fantàstic a Competició ===
The following films will compete in Official Fantastic In-Competition Selection:

† Indicates award winner.

English title	Original title	Director(s)	Production country(ies)
11		Clàudia and Paula Serra	Spain
The Birthday Party	Histoires de la Nuit	Léa Mysius	France
Blades of the Guardians	镖人	Yuen Woo-ping	China, Hong Kong
Buddy		Casper Kelly	United States
Carapace	Salitre	Norma Vila	Spain
Colony	군체	Yeon Sang-ho	South Korea
Company		Casey Affleck	United States, Canada, Romania, Italy, United Arab Emirates
Drag		Raviv Ullman and Greg Yagolnitzer	United States
DreamQuil		Alex Prager	United Kingdom, United States
El exterior		Víctor Moreno	Spain Belgium
The End of It		Maria Martínez Bayona	United Kingdom, Norway, Spain
The Face of Horror		Anna Biller	United Kingdom
Found Alive		Carlota Pereda	United States
Frost		Pavle Vuckovic	Serbia
Full Phil		Quentin Dupieux	France
Ghost in the Cell		Joko Anwar	Indonesia
Hot Spot		Agnieszka Smoczyńska	Poland, Greece, Sweden, Norway
The Incomer		Louis Paxton	United Kingdom
Las hijas		Daniel Romero	Spain
Leviticus		Adrian Chiarella	Australia
Los Vampires		Craig Mitchell	United States
MUTTER: The Diary of a Mother		Alphan Eşeli	Turkey
Never After Dark	Nebâ Afutâ Dâku	Dave Boyle	Japan
Nightborn	Yön Lapsi	Hanna Bergholm	Finland, France, Lithuania, United Kingdom
No Rest for the Wicked		Kasper Kalle	Denmark, Faroe Islands, Iceland
The Ones Who Grieve		Alexandre Claudin	France
Onslaught		Adam Wingard	United States
River		Joshua Giuliano	United States
Species †	Sanguine	Marion Le Coroller	France
Sheep in the Box	箱の中の羊	Hirokazu Kore-eda	Japan
The Spiral	L'estranea	Paolo Strippoli	Italy, France, Belgium
Titanic Ocean		Konstantina Kotzamani	Greece, Germany, Romania, France, Spain
Upiro		Óscar Martín	Spain
Victorian Psycho		Zachary Wigon	United Kingdom, Ireland
We Are Aliens	我々は宇宙人	Kohei Kadowaki	Japan, France
Wildwood		Travis Knight	United States

=== Shorts ===
The following films were selected to be screened as a part of the Shorts section:

==== Official Fantastic Competition (Oficial Fantàstic Competició - Curts) ====
English title	Original title	Director(s)	Production countrie(s)
Opening film
Homing		Lizzie Atherton, Hansel Rodrigues	United Kingdom, Northern Ireland, Spain
Curts Fantàstics a Competició I (128 minutes)
La ley de las acciones		Carlos Hernández	Colombia
Bad Tooth		M. Dara Alavi	United States
CARNE		Laura Plebani Alavi	Italy, United Kingdom, Northern Ireland
Sleep Tight		Grace Presse	United States
The Man Who Controls The Traffic Lights		Ahmad Johardien	South Africa
TERM		Chadrick Preuss	United States
Man Eating Pussy		Emily Lawson	Canada
Curts Fantàstics a Competició II (150 minutes)
Reyes Malos		Kail Grösser	Spain
El moribundo		Laura Guerricaechevarria	Spain
Curts Fantàstics a Competició III (136 minutes)
Something Borrowed		Findlay Ironside	Canada
Curts Fantàstics a Competició IV (136 minutes)
Grýlu Sker		Kevin McTurk	United States
Animated Shorts in Competition I (110 minutes)
20001 An Earth Odyssey		Haruki Kasugamori	Japan
echo		Asuka Dokai	Japan
SUN’S ROSE, MOON’S LAPIS		Takashi Nakamura	Japan
SHIRANUI		Ryo Katanosaka	Japan
A Trip to the Ear		park Jee-youn	South Korea

=== Sitges Collection ===
English title	Original title	Director(s)	Production country(ies)
5 More Minutes	5 minutos más	Javier Ruiz Caldera	Spain
Beware Boiúna		Mike P. Nelson	United States, Germany
Crawlers		Ángel Hernández Gómez	United States
The Cycle		Jordan Downey	United Kingdom
Half		Samjad	India
Her Private Hell		Nicolas Winding Refn	Denmark, United States
Hope	호프	Na Hong-jin	South Korea
The House on the Moon	明月共此時	Nelson Yeo	Singapore, Taiwan, Indonesia, Germany
Inherit		Banjong Pisanthanakun	Thailand
The Mage		Danny Pang Phat, Oxide Pang	Hong Kong
Rain Catcher		Michele Fiascaris	United Kingdom
Red Snow	Punaista lunta	Ilja Rautsi	Finland, Estonia, Sweden
Rogue Trooper		Duncan Jones	United Kingdom, United States
Sacrifice		Romain Gavras	United Kingdom Greece, United States, Bulgaria
Shaun the Sheep: The Beast of Mossy Bottom		Steve Cox, Matthew Walker	United Kingdom, France, United States
The Swallow		Kevin Kölsch, Dennis Widmyer	United States
Teenage Sex and Death at Camp Miasma		Jane Schoenbrun	United States
Whalefall		Brian Duffield	United States

=== Noves Visions ===
English title	Original title	Director(s)	Production country(ies)
The Death of Dracula (Opening film)	La muerte de Drácula	Burnin' Percebes	Spain
SICK		Agata Trzebuchowska	Poland
A Prayer for the Dying		Dara Van Dusen	Norway, Greece, United Kingdom, Sweden
The Arrow at Rest at Every Instant of its Flight		Theodore Schaefer	United States
Sender		Russell Goldman	United States
Phillip Philadelphia		Adam C. Briggs	Australia
You're It	La mancha	Adrián García Bogliano, Ramiro García Bogliano	Argentina, Mexico
City of the Dead	Ciudad de Muertos	J. M. Cravioto	Mexico
Corpus		Corrin Evans	United States
Demons	Демони	Natalka Vorozhbyt	Ukraine, Poland
Family Fears Another Night of Terror	Familia teme enfrentar una nueva noche de terror	Cristian Ponce	Argentina
Interior		Pascal Schuh	Germany

=== Panorama ===
The following films were selected to be screened as a part of the Panorama section, for films previously screened at non-Spanish film festivals:

English title	Original title	Director(s)	Production countrie(s)
American Dollhouse		John Valley	United States
Breeder		Alex Goyette	United States
Dreadful Mother	La mala madre	Alicia Albares	Spain
The Eyes	눈동자	Yeom Ji-ho	South Korea
Forbidden Fruits		Meredith Alloway	United States
The Fox		Dario Russo	Australia
Hungry		James Nunn	United Kingdom
Ithaqua (Opening film)		Casey Walker	Canada
Posthumous		Josh Tanner	Australia
Salmokji: Whispering Water	살목지	Lee Sang-min	South Korea
The Saviors		Kevin Hamedani	United States
Sleep No More	Monster Pabrik Rambut	Edwin	Indonesia, Singapore, Japan, Germany, France

=== Brigadoon ===
English title	Original title	Director(s)	Production countrie(s)
Francesco Barilli – Il cinema e la follia		Luca Magri	Italy
Gli anni d'oro di Dario Argento		Luigi Cozzi	Italy
Forqué, el oficio de hacer cine		Rafael Maluenda and Gaizka Urresti	Spain
Mockbuster		Anthony Frith	Australia, United States
Scum of the Earth: Creating America's Rural Communities of Horror		Xavier Mendik	United Kingdom
Gli ultimi di noi		Giorgio Bruno	Italy
The Barn Part III		Justin M. Seaman	United States
The Rider: Burning Chrome		Justin Stillmaker	United States
Blood Barn		Gabriel Bernini	United States
Sexy Cat		Julio Pérez Tabernero	Spain
Operación Mantis (El exterminio del macho)		Jacinto Molina	Spain

=== Brigadoon Shorts ===
The following short films were selected to be screened as part of the Brigadoon section, competing for the Paul Naschy Award:

English title	Original title	Director(s)	Production countrie(s)
Breathwork		Erik Westerström	Sweden
Chäir		Chris McInroy	United States
Pobre Marciano		Alex Rey	Spain
The Old Lady and The Eternity		Marc Martínez Jordán	Spain
The Witchening		MK Kopp	United States
Gimme		Steven Schloss	United States
The Orange Circle		Mike Robinson	United States
Feed the Dark		Rob Himebaugh	United States
The Last Snow		Rodolphe Bouquet-Populus	France

=== Anima't ===
The following films were selected to be screened as a part of the Anima't section, for animated films:

English title	Original title	Director(s)	Production countrie(s)
Chimney Town: Frozen in Time	映画 えんとつ町のプペル 〜約束の時計台〜	Yusuke Hirota	Japan
ghost – end of night		Shingo Natsume	Japan
Gregor		Manu Gómez	Belgium, France
Long Long Night	긴긴밤	Youm Kyu-bock	South Korea
Lucy Lost	Lucy perdue	Olivier Clert	France
Monster Mia		Verena Fels	Austria, Spain, Germany
Peleliu: Guernica of Paradise	ペリリュー -楽園のゲルニカ-	Gorō Kuji	
Soul Shift		Christian Franz Schmidt	Germany
Spacetime Chronicles		Stefano Bertelli	Italy
Welcome to Dolly's House		Seven Ych, Rady Fu, Tree Muta	Taiwan
Wildwood		Travis Knight	United States

=== Seven Chances ===
English title	Original title	Director(s)	Production country(ies)
Dead Mountaineer’s Hotel (1979)	Hukkunud Alpinisti hotell	Grigori Kromanov	Estonia, Soviet Union
Love Massacre (1981)	愛殺	Patrick Tam	Hong Kong
Misterio (1980)		Marcela Fernández Violante	Mexico
The Bullet Train (1975)	新幹線大爆破	Junya Sato	Estonia, Japan
Office Killer (1980)		Cindy Sherman	United States
Battered Flesh (1978)	Carne apaleada	Javier Aguirre	Spain
The Quiet Earth (1985)		Geoff Murphy	New Zealand

=== Sitges Clàssics ===
This section includes the Festival's retrospective, specific tributes on the occasion of anniversaries and collaborations:

Year	English title	Original title	Director(s)	Production country
2024	Apocalypse Z: The Beginning of the End		Carles Torrens	Spain
1976	Carrie		Brian De Palma	United States
1971	The Devils		Ken Russell	United States, United Kingdom
1981	Scanners		David Cronenberg	Canada
1976	Who Can Kill a Child?	¿Quién puede matar a un niño?	Narciso Ibáñez Serrador	Spain

=== Midnight X-Treme ===
The following films were selected to be screened as a part of the Midnight X-Treme section, for indie and extreme horror films. Focused on the most extreme horror films, with monstrous creatures as special protagonists:

English title	Original title	Director(s)	Production countrie(s)
Higuma! The Killer Bear		Eisuke Naito	Japan
Gator Face		Padraig Reynolds	United States
Hotspring Shark Attack: Great Kyushu Showdown	Onsen shâku	Morito Inoue	Japan
Frogman Returns		Anthony Cousins	United States
Black Sheeps		Jonathan King	New Zealand
Mum, I'm Alien Pregnant		THUNDERLIPS	New Zealand
FLAPJAX		Rocko Zevenbergen	United States
Insectasy		Angus Silver	Canada
Astrolatry		David Gordon	United States
Corporate Retreat		Aaron Fisher	United States
Kick On		Nick Kozakis	Australia
Get Undressed	呪区	Seji Chiba	Japan
The Tao Exorcist	祭弒	Hau-Jou Chiou	Taiwan
Kung Fu Deadly		Fergal Costello	Ireland, Australia
The Demon Among Us		Claudio Fragasso	Italy
Unholy Night		Michael Gabriele	Canada
Hallowarrior		Ben Sottak	United States
I Love Paris		Nicky Murphy	France
Faces of Death		Daniel Goldhaber	United States

=== Òrbita ===
The following films were selected to be screened as a part of the Òrbita section, for films that "stand out for their unique approach and their audience appeal":

English title	Original title	Director(s)	Production countrie(s)
Arrested Memory	アレステッド・メモリ	Sabu	Japan
Bad Lieutenant: Tokyo	バッド・ルーテナント:トウキョウ	Takashi Miike	United States, United Kingdom, Japan, France
Blood Ties	Ikatan Darah	Siddhartha Tata	Indonesia
Chapter 51 (Opening film)		Tyler Shields	United States
Cold War 1994	寒戰	Longman Leung	Hong Kong
Dante		Hugo Ruiz	Spain
Karma		Guillaume Canet	France
Kill Me		Peter Warren	United States
Father Joe		Barthélémy Grossmann	France
The Samurai and the Prisoner	黒牢城	Kiyoshi Kurosawa	Japan
Summer War	Guerra de verano	Alicia Scherson	Chile Argentina Uruguay Italy
Too Many Beasts	L'Espèce explosive	Sarah Arnold	France
Vintage Violence		Eugene Kotlyarenko	United States, Japan
Tokyo Burst: The Roundup	犯罪都市	Eiji Uchida	Japan

=== Sitges Documenta ===
English title	Original title	Director(s)	Production countrie(s)
"Dernsie" La vida increíble de Bruce Dern		Mike Mendez	Spain

=== Sitges Family ===
English title	Original title	Director(s)	Production countrie(s)
Brave Cat	Konas Mission	Gabriel Osorio Vargas	Chile
Olivia & the Clouds	Olivia & Las Nubes	Tomás Pichardo Espaillat	Dominican Republic
Don't Come Out	No Salgas	Victoria Linares Villegas	Dominican Republic
Risa and the Wind Phone		Juan Cabral	Argentina

=== Serial Sitges ===
English title	Original title	Director(s)	Production countrie(s)
Carrie		Mike Flanagan	United States
Fin de trayecto		Residencia de Relleu	Spain
Malnombre		Alfonso cortés-Cavanillas	Spain
Strange: Junji Ito's Tales for Sleepless Nights	ストレンジ -伊藤潤二の夜も眠れぬ奇妙な話-	Junji Ito	Japan

== Awards ==
The main awards of the 58th edition of the SITGES were announced on 17 October 2026.

=== SOFC jury prizes ===
- Best Film: Species (Sanguine) by Marion Le Coroller
  - Special Jury Prize: Drag by Raviv Ullman and Greg Yagolnitzer
- Best Director: Joko Anwar for Ghost in the Cell
- Best Actress: Jasmine Trinca for The Spiral
- Best Actor: Benoît Magimel for The Birthday Party
- Best Screenplay: Casper Kelly and Jamie King for Buddy
- Best Cinematography: Raphaël Vandenbussche for Titanic Ocean
- Best Music: Mondo Boys for River
- Best Special Effects: Hong Jeong-ho for Colony
- Citizen Kane Award for Best New Director: Adrian Chiarella for Leviticus

=== Noves Visions ===
- Best feature film:
  - Hen by Nico Scheepers
- Best Director: (ex aequo for)
  - Burnin' Percebes for The Death of Dracula
  - Cristian Ponce for Family Fears Another Night of Terror
- Best Short Film: Snakes in Lace, by Martina Pavlíková

=== Òrbita ===
- Best Orbit Film: Gummy by Javi Prada

=== Anima't ===
- Best Animated Feature Film: We Are Aliens by Kōhei Kadowaki
- Best Animated Short Film: The Flesh Dress by Joachim Hérissé

=== Méliès d'Or ===
- Méliès d'Or Award for the best European feature film: Feels Like Home by Gábor Holtai
- Méliès d'Or Award for the best European short film: The Old Lady and the Eternity by Marc Martínez Jordán

=== Méliès d'Argent ===
- Méliès d'Argent Award for the Best Film: The Spiral by Paolo Strippoli
- Méliès d'Argent Award for the Best Short Film: El moribundo by Laura Guerricaechevarría

=== Brigadoon ===
- Brigadoon Paul Naschy Award for Best Short Film: The Last Snow by Rodolphe Bouquet-Populus

=== Sitges Documenta ===
- Best Sitges Documenta Film: "Dernsie" La vida increíble de Bruce Dern by Mike Mendez

=== Critic's Jury ===
- Carnet Jove Jury Award for Best Feature Film in the SOFC:
  - Ghost in the Cell by Joko Anwar
- José Luis Guarner FIPRESCI Award: The Incomer by Louis Paxton

=== SGAE Nova Autoria Award ===
- Best Director
  - Nausica Serra for Dissecció d'una incoherència en crisi
- Best Screenplay
  - Diana Magallón for Amor comestible
- Best Original Music
  - Pablo Garayoa and Lídia Grau for Amber Lights

=== People' Choice Award ===
- Grand People's Choice Award for Best Feature film in the SOFC: Wildwood by Travis Knight
- Best Feature Film in Sitges Collection: 5 More Minutes by Javier Ruiz Caldera
- Best Feature Film in the Panorama Section: The Fox by Dario Russo
- Best Feature Film in the Midnight X-Treme Section: Kung Fu Deadly by Fergal Costello
- People's Choice Award for Best Feature film Blood Window: No Salgas by Victoria Linares
- Best Feature Film in Focus Asia: Blades of the Guardians: Wind Rises in the Desert by Yuen Woo-ping

=== Special awards ===
The awards announced are as follows:

==== Time Machine Award ====
- Robert Eggers, American filmmaker

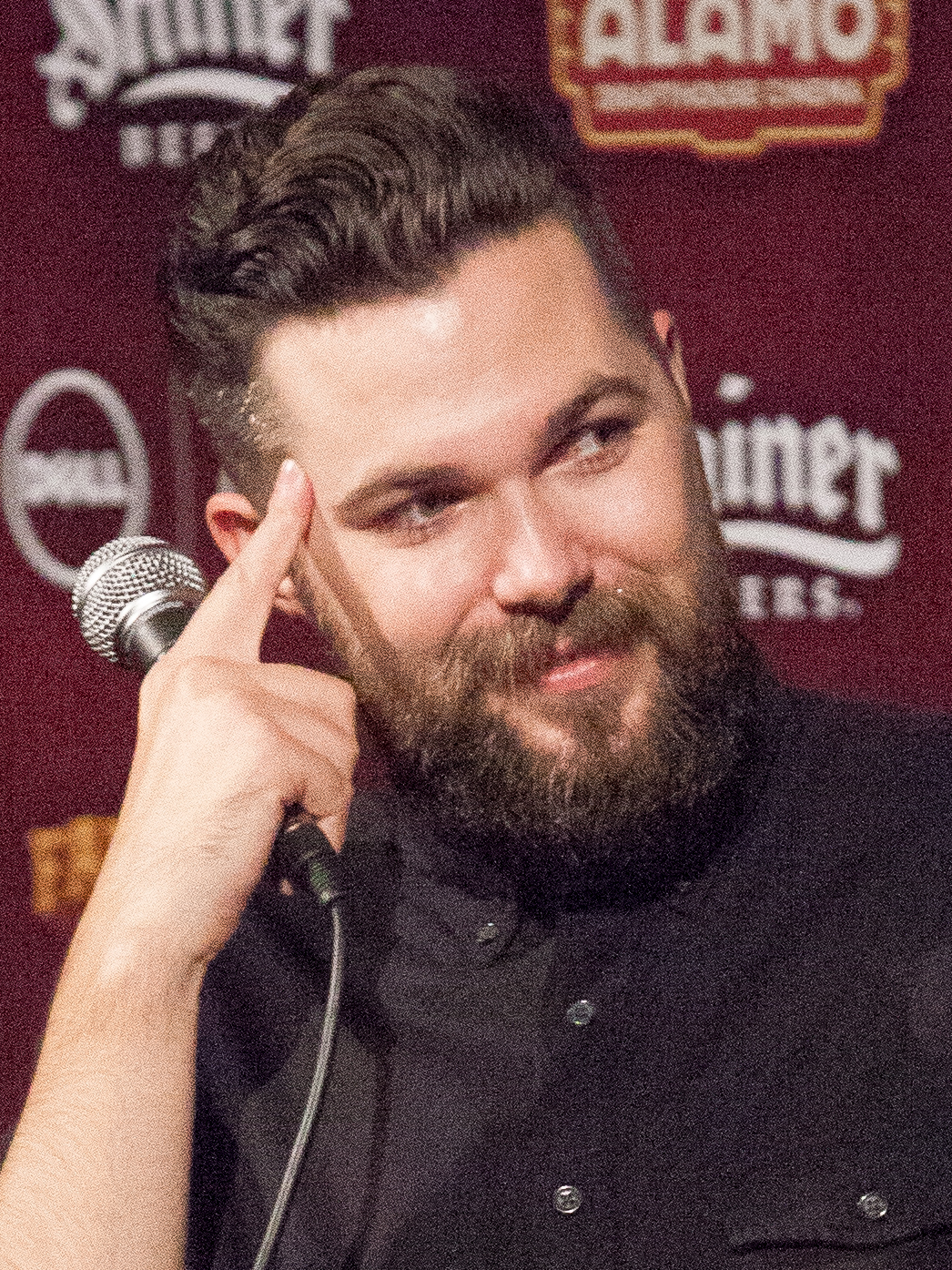
Robert Eggers, recipient of the Time Machine Award

- Yuen Woo-ping, Hong Kong martial arts choreographer and film director

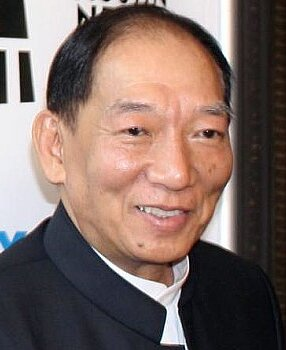
Yuen Woo-ping, recipient of the Time Machine Award

- Takashi Shimizu, Japanese filmmaker

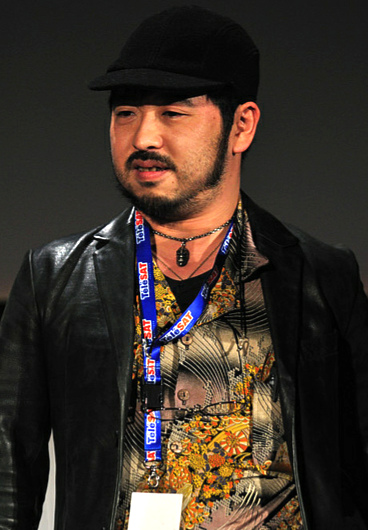
Takashi Shimizu, recipient of the Time Machine Award

- Mark L. Lester, American film director, screenwriter, and producer
- Bob Murawski, American film editor and distributor
- Na Hong-jin, South Korean filmmaker

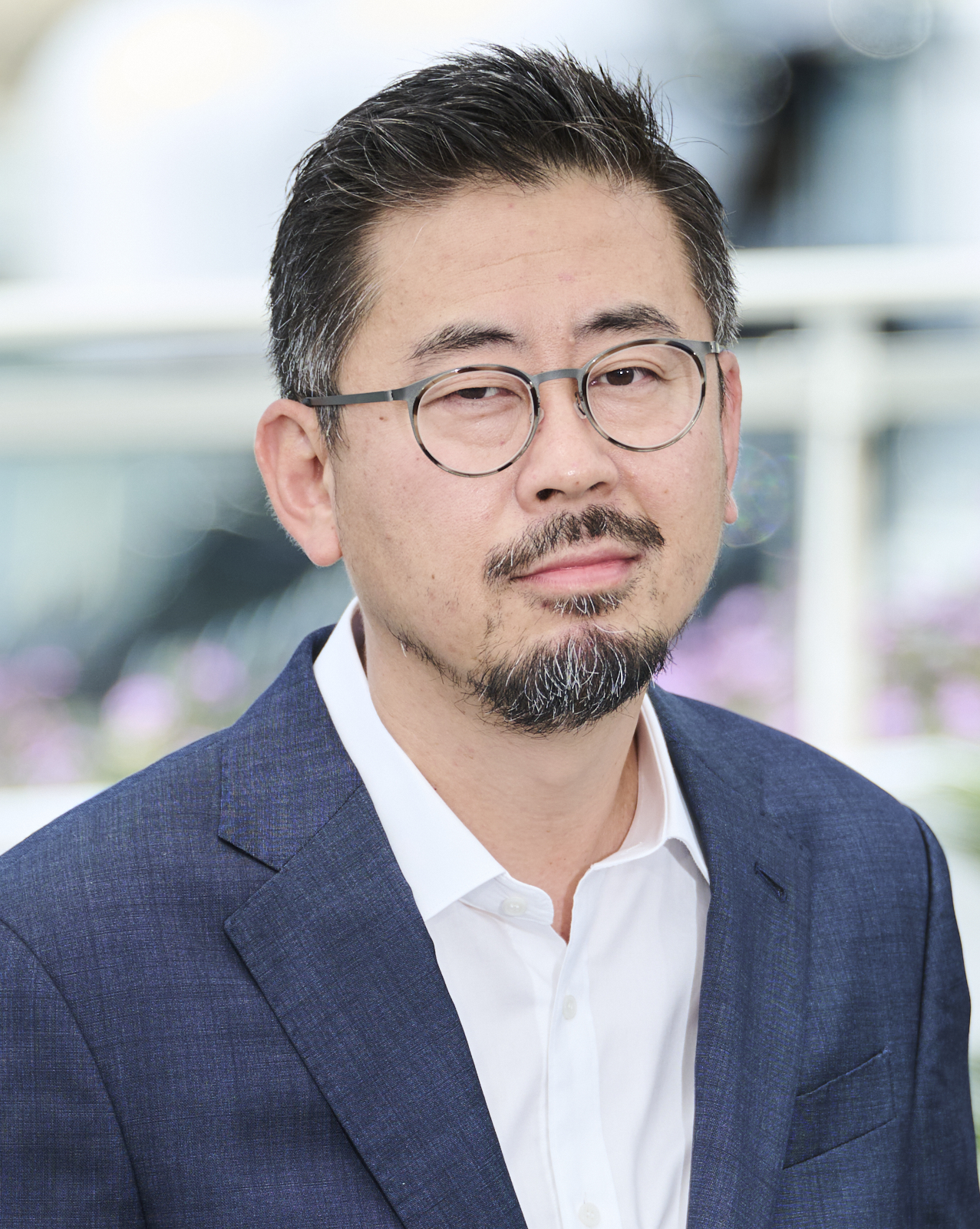
Na Hong-jin recipient of the Time Machine Award

==== Nosferatu Award ====
- Bárbara Rey, Spanish film and television actress

==== Grand Honorary Awards ====
- Danny DeVito, American actor, comedian and filmmaker

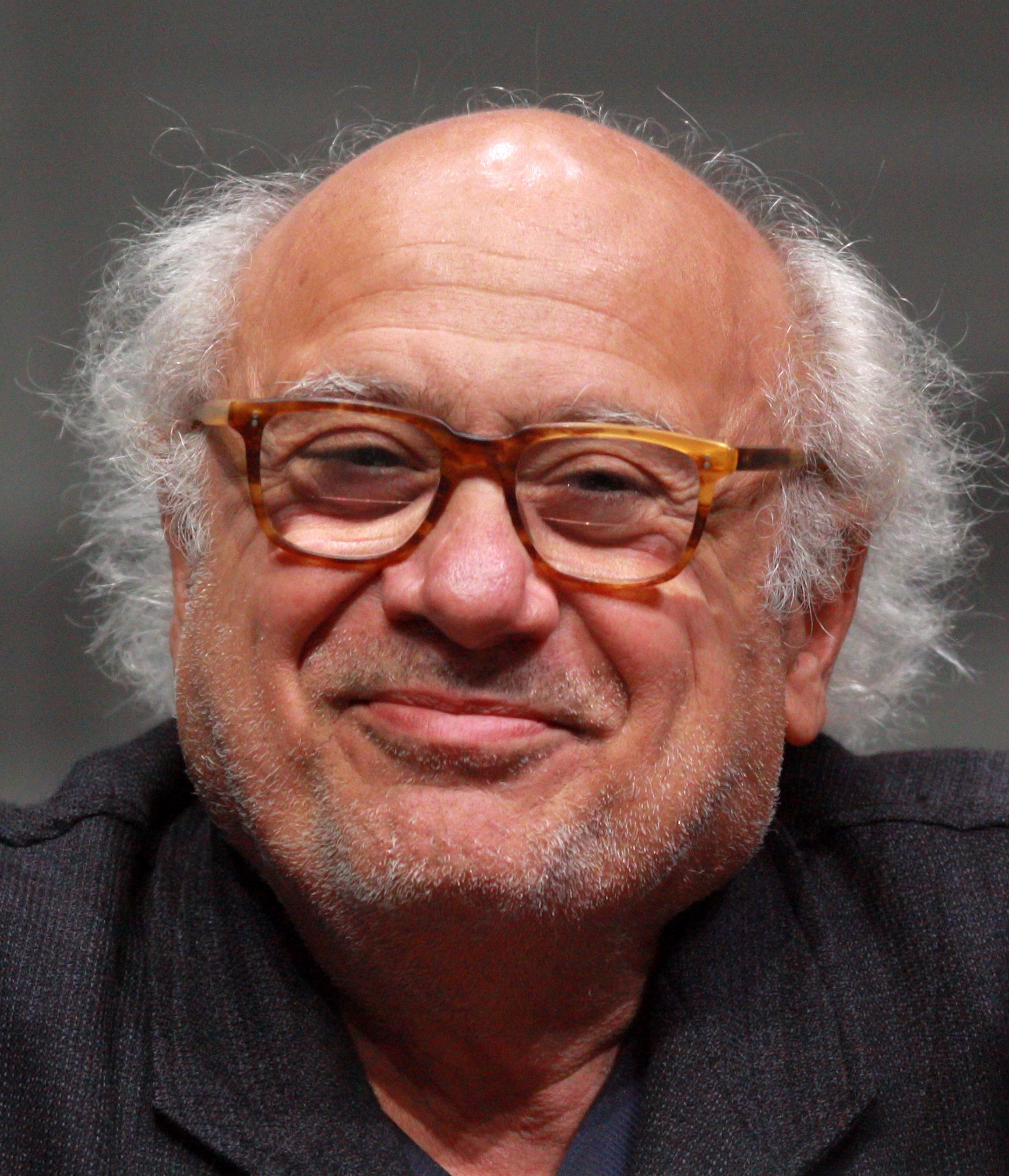
Danny DeVito, recipient of the Grand Honorary Award

- Amy Irving, American actress and singer

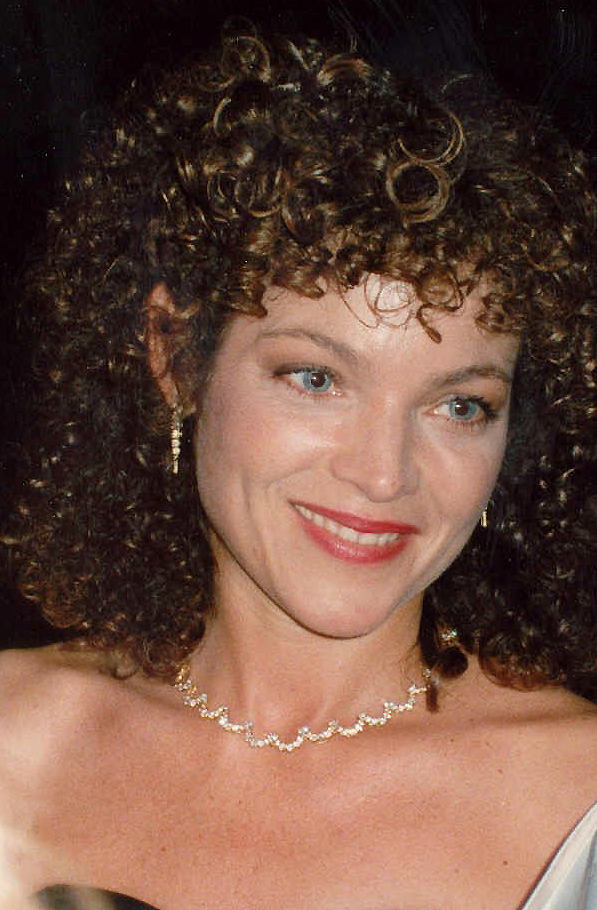
Amy Irving, recipient of the Grand Honorary Award

- Kevin Bacon, American actor

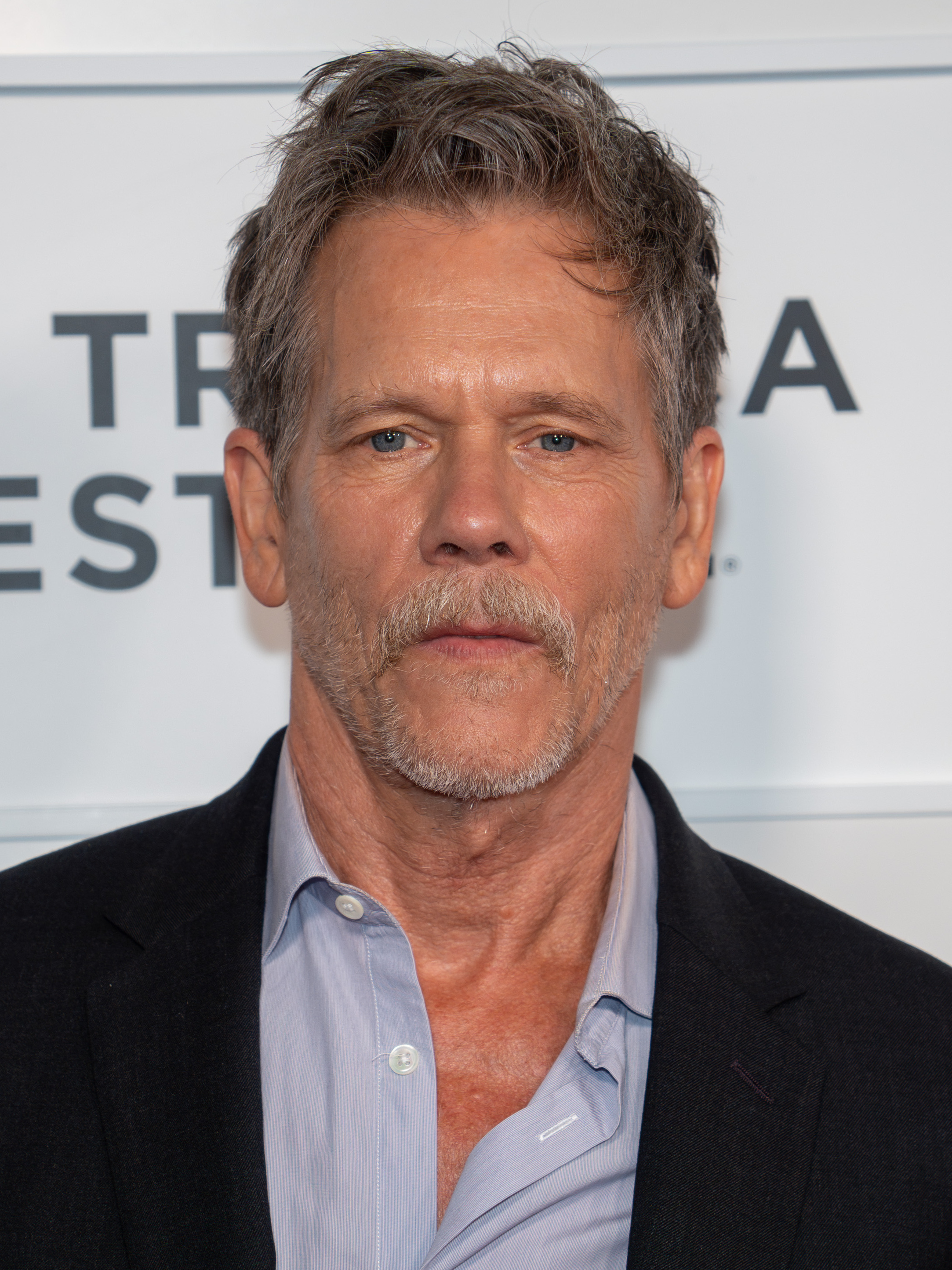
Kevin Bacon, recipient of the Grand Honorary Award

- Kyra Sedgwick, American film and television actress

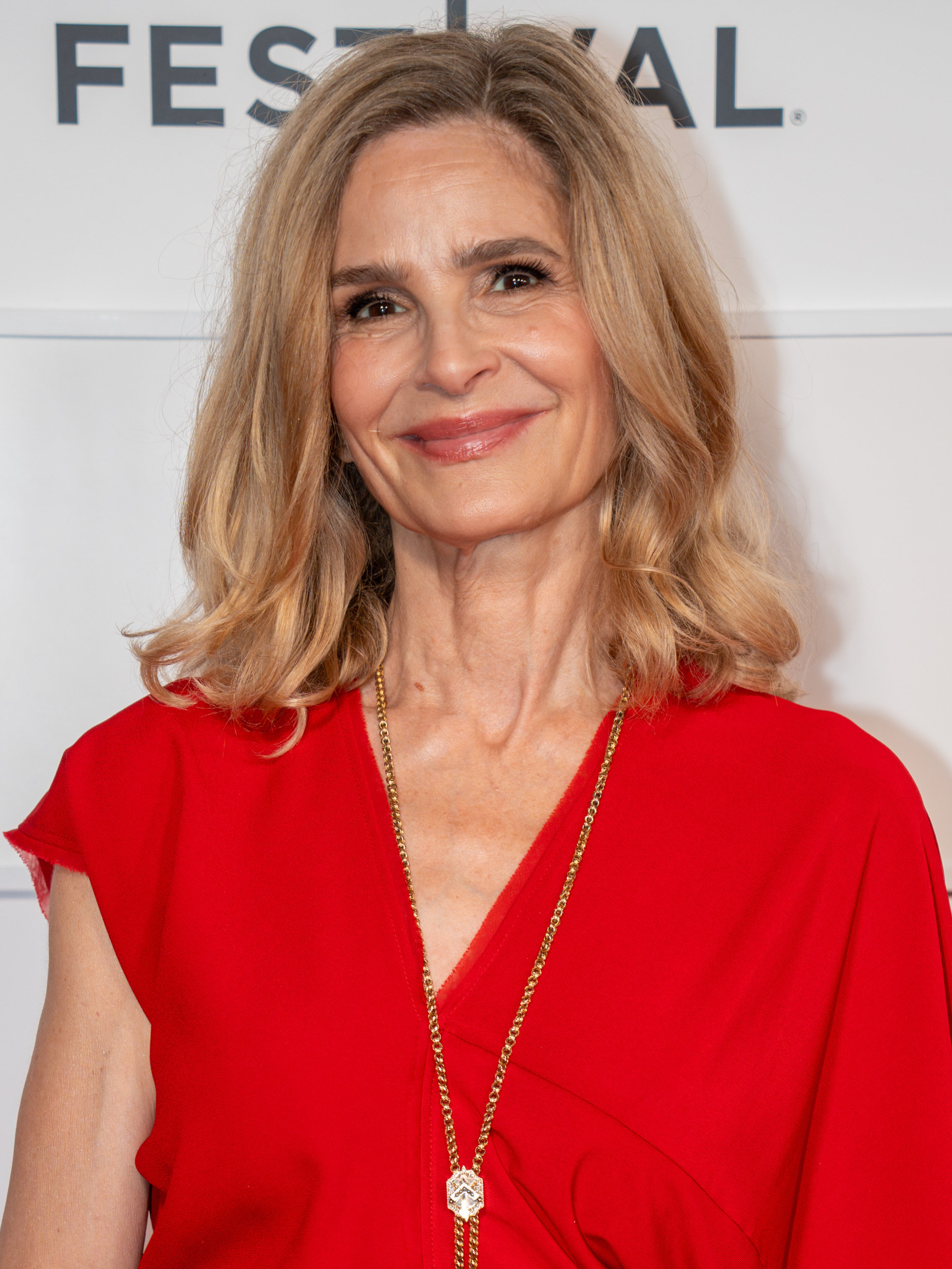
Kyra Sedgwick, recipient of the Grand Honorary Award

- Peter Jackson, New Zealand filmmaker, entrepreneur and visual effects pioneer

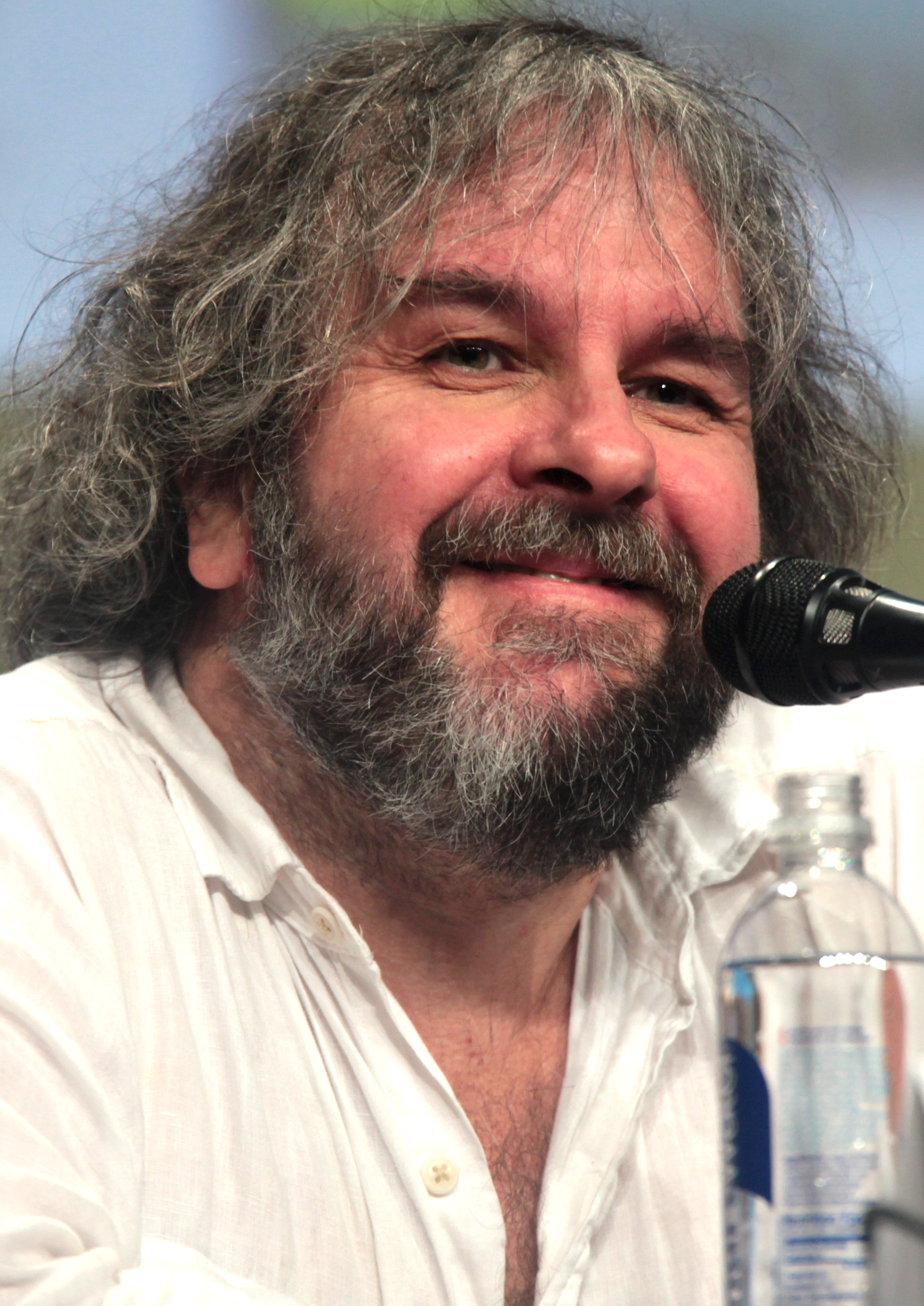
Peter Jackson, recipient of the Grand Honorary Award

==== WomanInFan Award ====
- Adrienne Barbeau, American actress and author

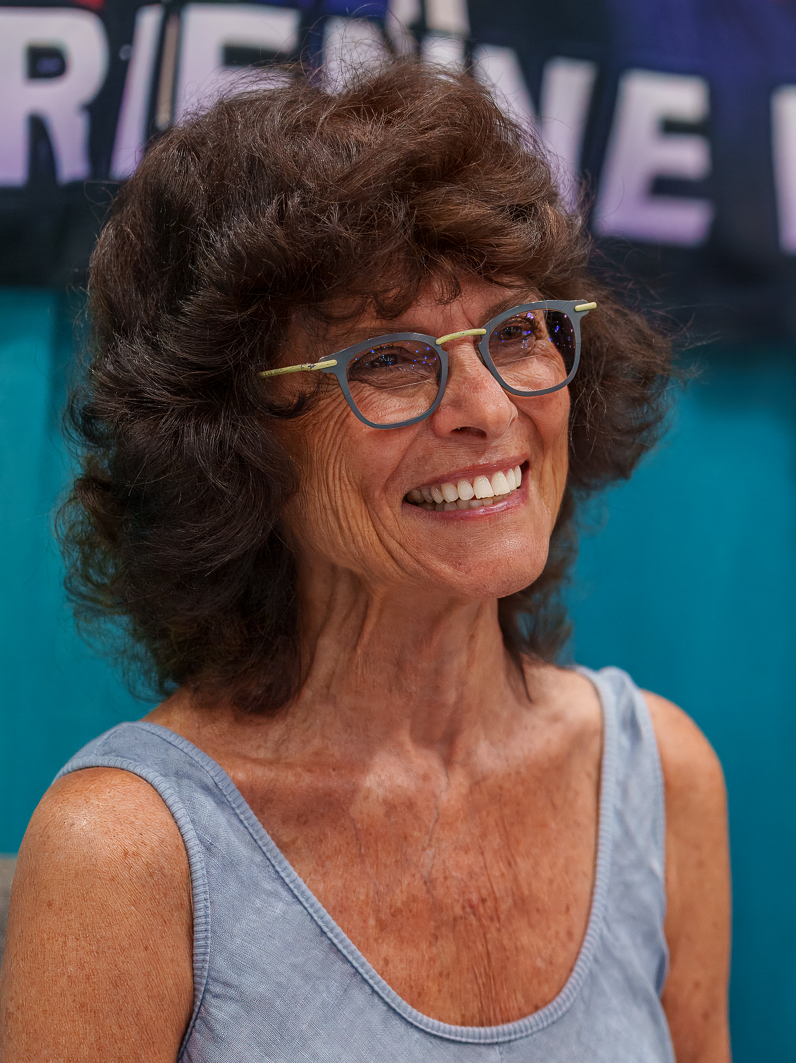
Adrienne Barbeau, recipient of the WomanInFan Award

- Meiko Kaji, Japanese actress and singer

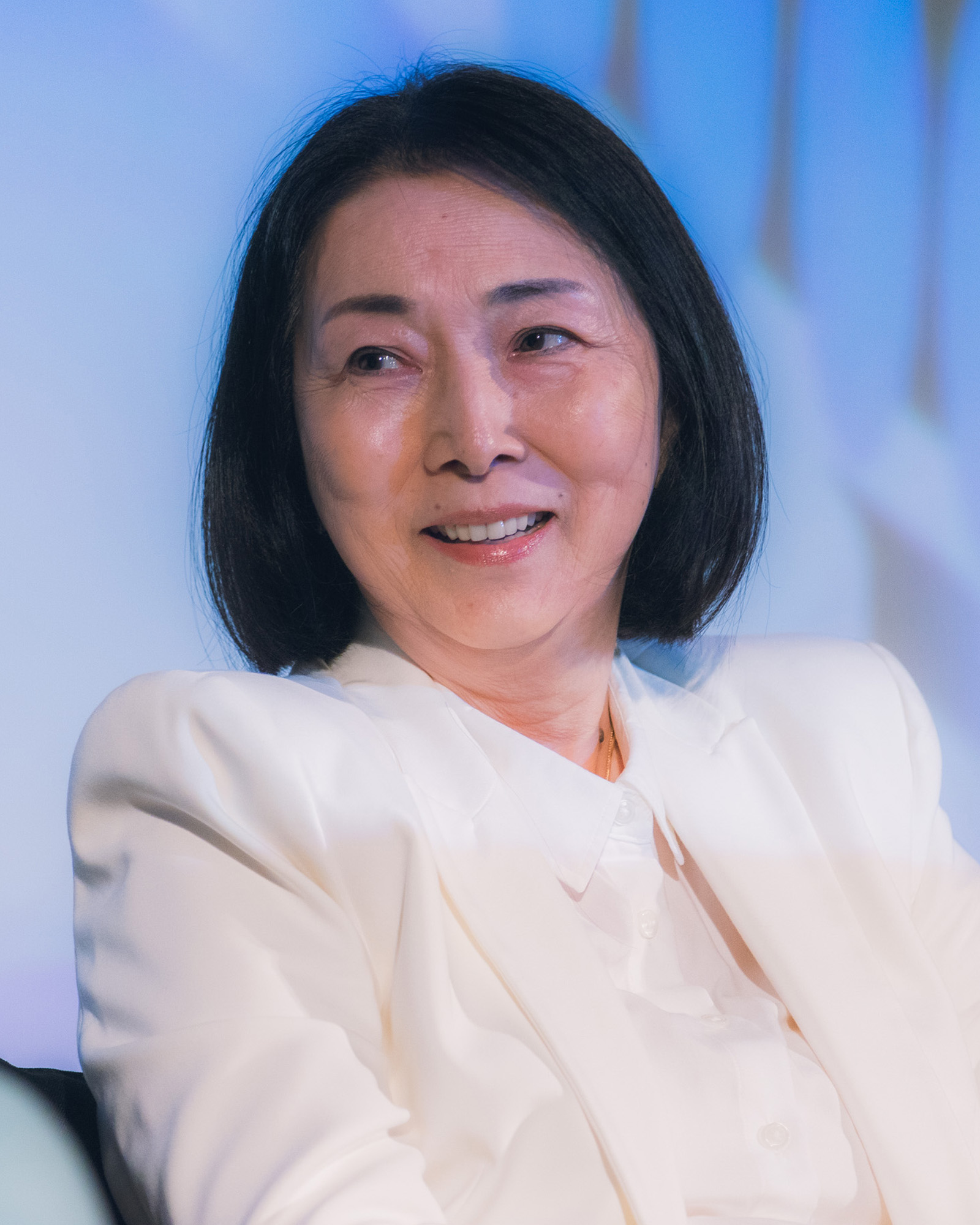
Meiko Kaji, recipient of the WomanInFan Award

==== Méliès Career Award ====
- Alejandro Amenábar, Chilean-Spanish film director, screenwriter and composer

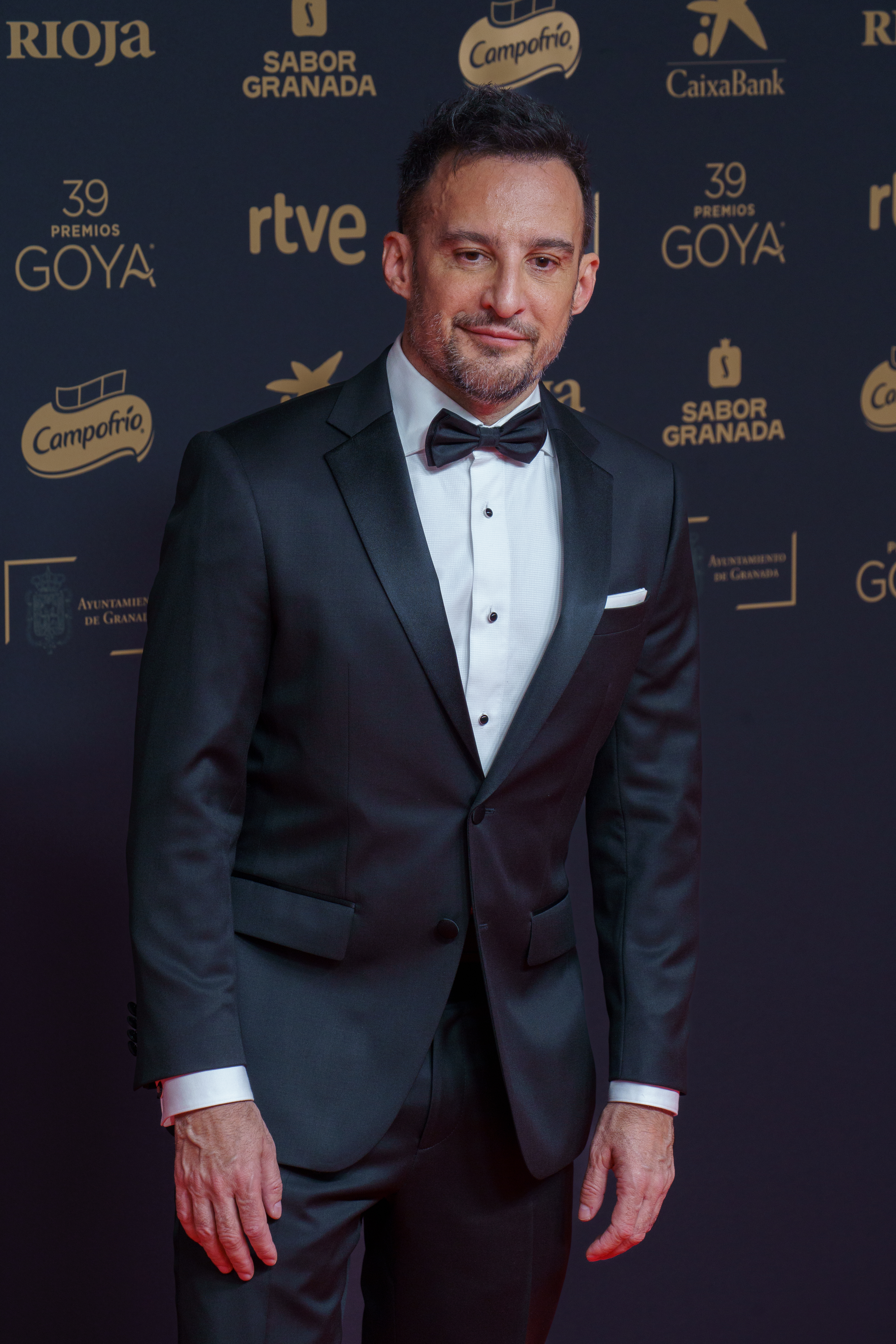
Alejandro Amenábar, recipient of the Méliès Career Award

==== Industry Award ====
- Bernardo Bergeret, cultural and artistic manager, record producer and promoter of Argentine cinema internationally

Bernardo Bergeret, recipient of the Industry Award

- David Gregory, American television personality and the former host of NBC News' Sunday morning talk show Meet the Press

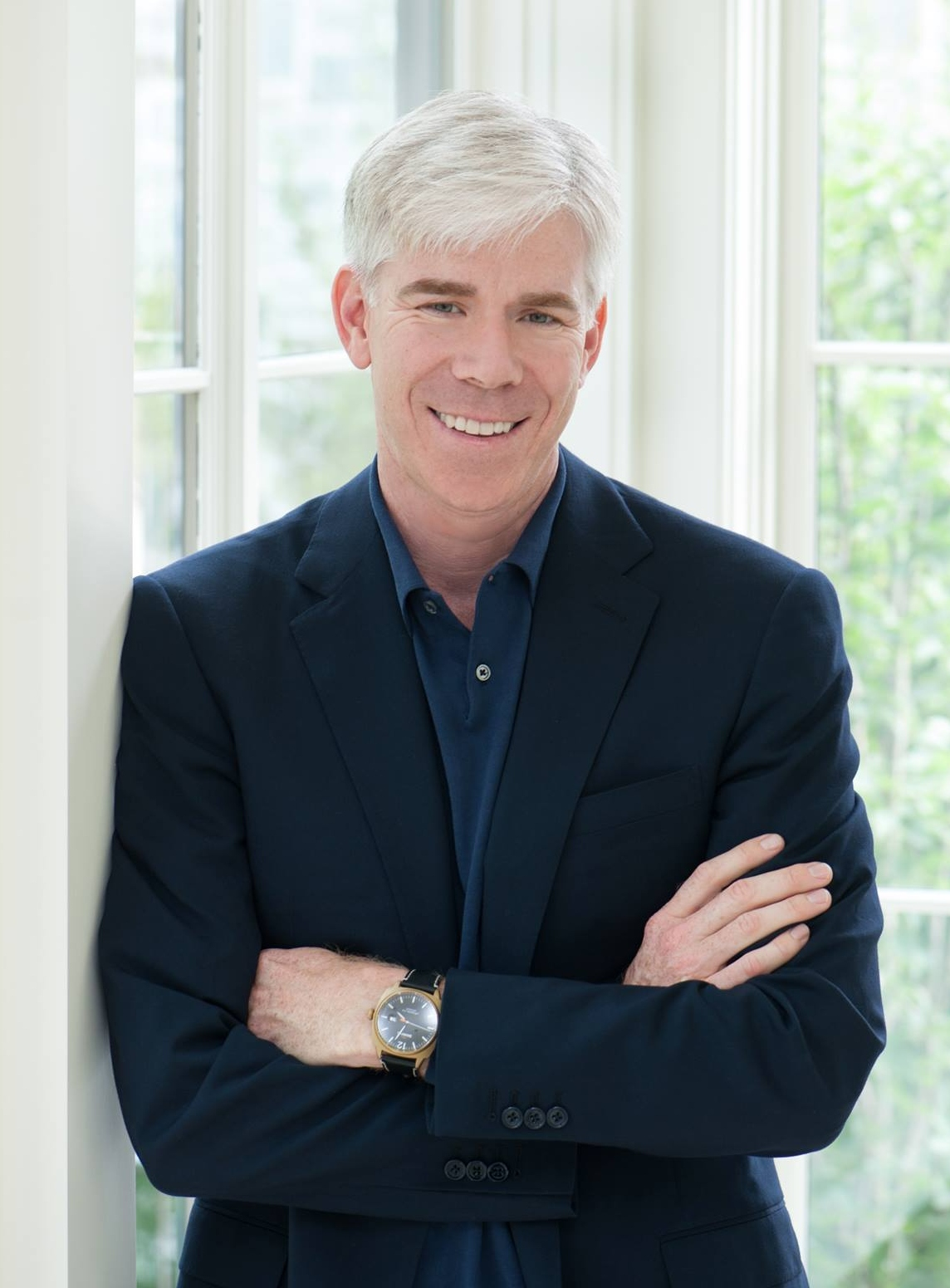
David Gregory, recipient of the Industry Award

- Jorge Gabarró, Producer, writer

==== Josefina Molina Award ====
- Inés Toharia Terán, Spanish filmmaker, specializing in documentaries for
