= Black Sheep (2006 New Zealand film) =

New Zealand comedy horror film by Jonathan King

- Theatrical release poster
- Directed by: Jonathan King
- Written by: Jonathan King
- Produced by: Philippa Campbell
- Starring: Nathan Meister; Danielle Mason; Peter Feeney; Tammy Davis; Glenis Levestam; Tandi Wright; Oliver Driver
- Cinematography: Richard Bluck
- Edited by: Chris Plummer
- Music by: Victoria Kelly
- Production companies: New Zealand On Air; New Zealand Film Commission; The Daesung Group; Escapade Pictures; Singlet Films; Live Stock Films
- Distributed by: Icon Film Distribution
- Release dates: 10 September 2006 (TIFF); 29 March 2007 (New Zealand)
- Running time: 87 minutes
- Country: New Zealand
- Box office: US$5 million

Black Sheep is a 2006 New Zealand comedy horror film written and directed by Jonathan King. It was produced by Philippa Campbell and stars Nathan Meister, Danielle Mason, Peter Feeney, Tammy Davis, Glenis Levestam, Tandi Wright, and Oliver Driver as a group of people who must defend themselves when a genetic engineering experiment turns harmless sheep into bloodthirsty zombies.

Black Sheep premiered at the Toronto International Film Festival on September 10, 2006 and was theatrically released in New Zealand on March 29, 2007. The film received generally positive reviews from critics and grossed $5 million at the box office. It also received a Narcisse Award nomination for Best Feature Film. Black Sheeps, a sequel, was released in 2026.

== Plot ==
Young Henry Oldfield lives on a sheep farm in New Zealand with his older brother Angus and his father Oliver. Angus envies Henry's natural gift of farming and Oliver's pride. One day, Angus plays a cruel prank on Henry, terrifying him by killing, mutilating, and donning the carcass of Henry's pet sheep, Dudley. Moments afterwards, Mrs. Mac, the farm's housekeeper, informs them of their father's death. The combined shock of these two incidents leads Henry to develop a crippling phobia of sheep.

Fifteen years later, Henry returns to New Zealand to sell his share of the farm to Angus, ignorant of his experiments. Environmental activists Experience and Grant infiltrate Angus' lab and accidentally release a deformed mutant lamb which bites Grant. The lamb then escapes into the fields and bites another sheep.

Henry and his childhood friend Tucker visit the farm and notice a sheep that refuses to run away. They team up with Experience and investigate a farmhouse, where they find a farmer's mutilated body. Henry sees a sheep in the hallway and, due to his phobia, quickly hides in a room with the others. The sheep crashes through the door and Tucker shoots it. Henry, Tucker, and Experience drive away, but another sheep hiding in the car bites Tucker. On the other end of the farm, Angus meets Grant, who bites him and runs off.

After the car is destroyed, Henry, Tucker, and Experience seek refuge in the laboratory, where Henry learns of Angus' genetic experiments with his assistant Dr. Astrid Rush, whereby the sheep have turned from docile vegetarians into ferocious carnivores, whose bite can infect and transform a humans and other sheep. When Dr. Rush sees that Tucker's foot has now become a sheep's foot, she keeps him for study. Henry and Experience escape when Angus cannot bring himself to shoot his own brother. Flocks of sheep come running down the hill toward an offal pit surrounded by a gate. When Henry and Experience accidentally slip into the pit, Angus abandons them, but they are able to escape through caves underneath the farm.

They find the original barn that Henry remembers from his childhood. In the barn where Henry was traumatized as a child, they find Grant, now metamorphasized into a monstrous human-sheep hybrid. Back in the lab, Tucker is also in the middle of metamorphasizing, but Dr. Rush administers him an injection of amniotic fluid from one of the mutant lambs, which undoes the transformation. When Dr. Rush goes outside to give the news to Angus, she is killed by a sheep.

Angus gives a presentation about his new genetically engineered sheep to a group of international businesspersons, but they are soon slaughtered by the carnivorous flock, while Henry and Experience look on in horror. Angus finds the sheep are not aggressive to him due to his infection, while Henry and Experience manage to escape with Mrs. Mac, who drives them to the farmhouse. Henry finds Angus, learning he has a love for sheep and leaves in disgust. Henry realizes he has been infected and, unwilling to risk hurting Experience if he fully transforms, kisses her goodbye. While Experience and Mrs. Mac make their escape, Henry follows Angus to the farm's plane. Angus has now transformed into a gargantuan mutant half-human, half-sheep creature.

Henry struggles to fight him, but, governed by a sheep's instincts, Angus is kept in check by Henry and the farm's sheep dog. While Angus is cornered by the dog, the revolving propeller of the family's plane cuts into him and wounds him badly. Tucker arrive in time to disinfect both Angus and Henry with more amniotic fluid, administered via a medicine nozzle designed for sheep. Tucker, Henry, and Experience herd the mutant sheep into the barn, and Angus enters the barn, hoping the flock will bite him again, but the flock, driven by his bloody wounds, devours him instead. The trio destroy the flock in a methane-powered explosion. The cure is given to the surviving half-human, half-sheep hybrids, including Grant, who are all turned back into humans. While observing the once-again humans, the sheep dog, ominously, bleats like a sheep.

== Cast ==
- Nathan Meister as Henry Oldfield
  - Nick Fenton as Young Henry
- Danielle Mason as Experience
- Peter Feeney as Angus Oldfield
  - Eli Kent as Young Angus
- Tammy Davis as Tucker
  - Sam Clarke as Young Tucker
- Glenis Levestam as Mrs. Mac
- Tandi Wright as Dr. Astrid Rush
- Oliver Driver as Grant
- Matthew Chamberlain as Oliver Oldfield
- Richard Chapman as Muldoon
- Louis Sutherland as Winston
- Ian Harcourt as Brash
- James Ashcroft as Prebble
- Mick Rose as Mike
- Kevin McTurk as the Weresheep

== Production ==
The film's special effects were handled by Weta Workshop, including participation from Richard Taylor. It was financed in part by an investment from the Korean company Daesung Group. It was also the first time a Korean company had directly invested in a New Zealand film, though Weta Workshop had previously collaborated with Korean effects houses on the South Korean film The Host.

== Release ==
Black Sheep premiered at the 31st Toronto Film Festival on September 10, 2006 as part of their Midnight Madness series and was theatrically released in New Zealand on March 29, 2007. Black Sheep was released on DVD and Blu-ray on October 9, 2007 by Icon Home Entertainment.

In Spain, Manga Films released it on August 15, 2007, in a double-session Grindhouse lookalike after Severance. Warner Home Video (via Manga Films and its successor Vértice360) released the film on DVD on November 20, 2007, and in Blu-ray in March 2014. In North America, IFC Films picked up theatrical distribution rights, and Genius Products and The Weinstein Company released on DVD via their Dimension Extreme label.

== Critical reception ==
Rotten Tomatoes, a review aggregator, reports that 71% of 96 surveyed critics gave the film a positive review; the average rating is 6.4/10. The site's consensus reads: "With an outrageous premise played completely straight, Black Sheep is a violent, grotesque, and very funny movie that takes B-movie lunacy to a delirious extreme." Metacritic, which uses a weighted average, assigned the film a score of 62 out of 100, based on 17 critics, indicating "generally favorable" reviews.

In a positive review, the Houston Chronicle's Bruce Westbrook stated that the film combines its many influences with fresh ideas. Nigel Floyd of Time Out London rated the film 4/5 stars and called it a "treat for horror comedy fans". Philip French, writing for The Guardian, called it a "lively affair" and "full of what might be called shear terror". Andrew Pulver, also of The Guardian, was less impressed; he rated the film 2/5 and wrote that Shaun of the Dead had set the bar high for comedy horrors. Writing in The Zombie Movie Encyclopedia, Volume 2, academic Peter Dendle described it as an "excellent offering" that has zombie sheep "every bit as violent and contagious as the infected in 28 Days Later and other contemporary zombie fare".

== Awards ==
- Silver Raven to the Brussels International Festival of Fantasy Film, in 2007.
- Special Jury Prize to the Gérardmer Film Festival, in 2007.
- Audience Prize to the Gérardmer Film Festival, in 2007.
- Best Dramatic Presentation – Long Form Award at the 2008 Sir Julius Vogel Awards for New Zealand science fiction and fantasy

== Sequel ==
On November 5, 2024, it was announced that a sequel is in the works, with Jonathan King returning as director. It premiered at the 59th Sitges Film Festival in October 2026.
