= Philippa Mein Smith =

New Zealand-Australian academic and historian

Philippa Mein Smith is a New Zealand-Australian academic and historian who specialises in Australian history, New Zealand history, the history of Australia-New Zealand relations and health history.

== Education ==
Mein Smith completed a Bachelor of Commerce degree at the University of Canterbury in 1977 and worked briefly as an accountant before returning to the university for a postgraduate study. She graduated with a Master of Arts degree in History in 1983. Her thesis was titled The State and Maternity in New Zealand. Mein Smith completed her Ph.D. at the Australian National University in Canberra, in 1990; her thesis was titled Reformers, Mothers and Babies.

== Career ==
From 1989 to 1992, Mein Smith was a lecturer in economic history at Flinders University. During this time she had a biography of her great-great-great-grandfather, William Mein Smith, published in the Dictionary of New Zealand Biography. She then moved to a position in the History Department at the University of Canterbury, where she remained for 21 years.

In 2005, she wrote A Concise History of New Zealand, published by Cambridge University Press. Patricia Grimshaw, reviewing the book for the New Zealand Journal of History, praised the book, saying that Mein Smith had "brought together with admirable succinctness a wealth of information and ideas that will be bound to stimulate reflections on history, memory and representations of the past that are so critical to current national debate". Warwick Roger for North & South was less enthused, comparing it unfavourably to Michael King's successful A Penguin History of New Zealand and noting that Mein Smith took "a more feminist view of history" than King. A reviewer for Monash University noted that Mein Smith "argues persuasively and consistently for an acknowledgment of the role of radical women in the nation’s past and present", although felt King's work was stronger on racial relations in New Zealand.

From 2003 to 2006, Mein Smith was the recipient of a Royal Society of New Zealand Marsden Fund Grant, awarded to her to study the historical development of connections between Australia and New Zealand. This project was known as the "Anzac Neighbours" project. As a result, Mein Smith and her colleague Peter Hempenstall established the New Zealand Australia Connections Research Centre (NZAC) at the University of Canterbury in 2005.

In 2008, the centre was replaced with a larger New Zealand Australia Research Centre (NZARC), with Mein Smith as the director. Its launch coincided with the 25th anniversary of the New Zealand-Australia Closer Economic Relations Agreement (CER) and was marked with a symposium jointly hosted by the university and the New Zealand Institute of International Affairs.

In March 2013, Mein Smith took up a position as Professor of History at the University of Tasmania.

Notable students of Mein Smith include Rebecca Priestley, Professor of Science in Society at Victoria University of Wellington.

== Bibliography ==
- Mein Smith, Philippa (2012). A concise history of New Zealand (2nd ed.). Cambridge, England: Cambridge University Press. ISBN 978-1-107-40217-1.
