= L. S. Hearnshaw =

English psychologist and historian

- Born: Leslie Spencer Hearnshaw; 1907
- Died: 1991 (aged 83–84)
- Education: King's College School; Christ Church, Oxford; King's College London
- Spouse: Gwenneth Dickens (m. 1937–1991)
- Children: John Hearnshaw
- Scientific career
- Fields: Psychology
- Workplaces: Victoria University of Wellington; Liverpool University

Leslie Spencer Hearnshaw (1907–1991) was an English psychologist and historian of psychology.

== Education and academic career ==
Hearnshaw attended King's College School, Christ Church, Oxford, and King's College London. He served as the first director of the industrial psychology division of the Department of Scientific and Industrial Research in New Zealand from 1942 to 1947, and he taught at Victoria University of Wellington in that country from 1937 to 1947. He returned to England in 1947 to become professor of psychology at Liverpool University, a position he held until his retirement in 1975. He served as president of the British Psychological Society from 1955 to 1956.

== Cyril Burt ==
Hearnshaw delivered a eulogy in memory of British psychologist Cyril Burt on 10 October 1971. He was the author of a 1979 biography of Burt that had been approved in advance by Burt's sister. It was also based on many of Burt's private papers, which has led to it being considered to be his definitive and authoritative biography. Before he started to write the biography, Hearnshaw's opinion of Burt was very favorable, as evidenced by Hearnshaw's respectful tone in his eulogy. However, while doing research for the book, he became convinced of the accusations of scientific fraud previously leveled against Burt. The biography has been credited with convincing the British Psychological Society to officially accept that Burt had committed fraud.

== Personal life ==
The son of history professor F. J. C. Hearnshaw, L. S. Hearnshaw married Gwenneth Dickens in 1937. He died in 1991 and Dickens died in 1993. He was survived by his son, John Hearnshaw, a professor at the University of Canterbury in Christchurch, New Zealand.

== Publications ==
- Hearnshaw, L.S. (1986). The Shaping of Modern Psychology. London: Routledge.
- Hearnshaw, L.S. (1979). Cyril Burt, psychologist. London: Hodder & Stoughton.
- Hearnshaw, L.S. (1966). A Short History of British Psychology 1840-1940. London: Methuen.
