= Rachael King =

New Zealand writer

- Born: 1970 (age 55–56); Hamilton, New Zealand
- Education: Victoria University of Wellington
- Father: Michael King
- Relatives: Jonathan King (brother); Rebecca Priestley (sister-in-law)
- Writing career
- Language: English
- Notable works: The Sound of Butterflies, Red Rocks
- Notable awards: Esther Glen Award
- Website: rachael-king.com

Rachael King (born 1970) is a New Zealand fiction writer. Her book Red Rocks (2012) won the LIANZA Esther Glen Junior Fiction Award and was adapted into the 2025 television series Secrets at Red Rocks. For eight years she was literary director of the WORD Christchurch Writers and Readers Festival.

== Life ==
King was born in 1970, in Hamilton, New Zealand. In 2001 she received a Master of Arts in creative writing from Victoria University of Wellington.

King is a bass guitarist and has played with several bands on the Flying Nun label.

King's father was the historian and author Michael King and her brother is filmmaker Jonathan King.

King was a contestant on season 3 of the reality television show The Traitors NZ.

== Writing career ==
King has published five novels:

- The Sound of Butterflies (2006, Random House)
- Magpie Hall (2009, Random House)
- Red Rocks (2012, Random House)
- The Grimmelings (2024, Allen & Unwin)
- Violet and the Velvets, The Case of the Missing Stuff (2025, Allen & Unwin)
- Violet and the Velvets, The Case of the Angry Ghost (2025, Allen & Unwin)

Short stories by King have been published in several anthologies including in Home: New Short Short Stories by New Zealand Writers and Creative Juices.

In 2013, King became literary director of the WORD Christchurch Writers and Readers Festival. She was a judge for the New Zealand Book Awards for Children and Young Adults in 2017.

King's book Red Rocks was adapted into the 2025 television series Secrets at Red Rocks.

== Awards ==
King won the 2005 Lilian Ida Smith Award. In 2007, King's first novel The Sound of Butterflies won the NZSA Hubert Church Best First Book Award for Fiction at the Montana New Zealand Book Awards. She was also the 2008 Ursula Bethell Writer in Residence at the University of Canterbury.

Her novel for children, Red Rocks, was shortlisted for the Junior Fiction category in the 2013 New Zealand Post Children's Book Awards and won the LIANZA Esther Glen Award.

The Case of the Missing Stuff was shortlisted for the New Zealand Book Awards for Children and Young Adults' Wright Family Foundation Esther Glen Junior Fiction Award in 2025. The Case of the Missing Stuff and The Case of the Angry Ghost were both named as Storylines Notable Junior Fiction Books for 2025.

King's 2025 book Violet and the Velvets 2: The Case of the Angry Ghost was a finalist for the Wright Family Foundation Esther Glen Junior Fiction Award in the 2026 New Zealand Book Awards for Children and Young Adults.
