= Found Alive =

Found Alive may refer to:

- Found Alive (1933 film), an American pre-Code drama film
- Found Alive (2026 film), an upcoming American thriller film
