= Heirs of the Beast =

- Film poster
- Directed by: Diego López; David Pizarro
- Screenplay by: Diego López; David Pizarro
- Produced by: Xavi Llorca; Xevi Subinyà; Xosé Veiga
- Starring: Jorge Guerricaechevarría; Alex de la Iglesia
- Cinematography: Albert Calveres
- Edited by: Alberto Calveres
- Music by: Buio Mondo
- Production company: Areavisual SL
- Distributed by: La Aventura Audiovisual
- Release date: 11 August 2016 (Spain)
- Running time: 80 min
- Country: Spain
- Language: Spanish

Heirs of the Beast (Spanish: Herederos de la bestia) is a 2016 Spanish documentary film directed by Diego López and David Pizarro, released on 5 May 2017. It is the first film directed by both directors.

This film is a documentary on the 1995 film El día de la bestia, directed by Álex de la Iglesia. Except Álex Angulo, who died in 2014, all cast involved in this film appear in the documentary.

It was released at the Sitges Film Festival, the Zinema Zombie Fest de Colombia, the Ventana Sur de Argentina and the Masacre en Xoco de México.

== Cast ==
- José Luis Rebordinos
- Ángel Sala
- Jaume Balagueró
- Nacho Cerdà
- Quim Casas
- Pablo Berger
- Enrique Urbizu
- Álex de la Iglesia
- José Luis Arrizabalaga
- Arturo García Biafra
- Jorge Guerricaechevarría
- Paco Plaza
- César Strawberry
- Andrés Vicente Gómez
- Flavio Martínez Labiano
- David Martí
- El Gran Wyoming
- Armando De Razza
- Nathalie Seseña
- Terele Pávez
- Pipo Fernández
- Santiago Segura
- Saturnino García
- Reyes Abades

== Awards and nominations ==
Herederos de la bestia has won the Premio al Documental en el PAURA at the Festival Internacional de Cine de Terror de Valencia.
