= Black Sheeps =

2026 horror comedy film

- Film poster
- Directed by: Jonathan King
- Written by: Jonathan King; Matthew Grainger; Rosie Howells
- Produced by: Jonathan King; Matthew Grainger; James Partridge
- Starring: Tabatha Killick; Lucia Davison; Joe Witkowski; Ian Harcourt; Nathan Meister
- Production companies: All World Entertainment; Index Films; Terror-Fi Entertainment
- Distributed by: Umbrella Entertainment
- Release dates: 11 October 2026 (Sitges); 12 November 2026
- Running time: 97 minutes
- Countries: New Zealand; United States
- Language: English

Black Sheeps is a 2026 comedy horror film produced, co-written, and directed by Jonathan King, and stars Tabatha Killick, Lucia Davison, Joe Witkowski, Ian Harcourt, and Nathan Meister. It is the sequel to the 2006 film Black Sheep. Set 20 years after the events of Black Sheep, the plot revolves around a young scientist named Oats (Tabatha Killick) returning to her provincial hometown to find a cure for a virus turning people into sheep-like creatures. The sequel premiered at the 59th Sitges Film Festival in October 2026 and was released in New Zealand on 12 November 2026.

== Premise ==
A scientist is certain that a new pathogen is endangering people and traces its origins to her hometown.

== Cast ==
- Tabatha Killick as Oats
- Lucia Davison as Maia
- Heather O'Carroll as Colleen
- Joe Witkowski as Frank
- Ian Harcourt as Brash, Oats' father
- Nathan Meister as Henry
- Oliver Driver as Grant
- Paul Waggott as Paul
- Tammy Davis as Tucker
- Renaye Tamati as Ana
- Hilary Norris as Moira

== Production ==
=== Development ===
Black Sheeps was produced by Jonathan King and Matthew Grainger, who had previously worked on Black Sheep. Other producers included James Partridge and Samantha Braun of Terror-Fi Films. Richard Fletcher of Libertine Pictures, Philippa Campbell, Ari Harrison, and Jasmin McSweeney from Umbrella Entertainment also served as executive producers.

=== Casting ===
Returning Black Sheep cast members included Nathan Meister as Henry Oldfield, Oliver Driver and Tammy Davis. New cast members included Tabatha Killick, Lucia Davison, Joseph Witkowski, Ian Harcourt, Heather O'Carroll, Paul Waggott and Renaye Tamati.

=== Filming and special effects ===
Richard Taylor's special effects company Wētā Workshop, which had previously worked on Black Sheep, produced the practical effects for the sequel's sheep-like creatures including suits, animatronics and prosthetics. The film's production team opted to use practice effects instead of digital technology.

Filming for Black Sheep occurred at Avalon Studios in Lower Hutt in 2026. To simulate fake blood and other body fluids, the art department used a mixture of strawberry and orange jelly crystals and custard. The production also utilised prosthetics, costumes and puppetry for the creature performers including Ben Fransham playing the role of mutated sheep-like monsters. Rubber prosthetics were also used to create limbs and severed body parts. Bill Hunt Studio also provided practical effects including rubber intestines for the film's gore and blood.

== Release ==
In mid September 2026, Umbrella Entertainment released the first official trailer for Black Sheeps. On 7 October, official stills of the film were released. The film premiered at the 59th Sitges Film Festival in October 2026.

Black Sheeps was released in New Zealand cinemas on 12 November 2026. The film received an R16 rating from the Classification Office.

== Reception ==
Boris Jancic of Radio New Zealand gave Black Sheeps a positive review, awarding the movie 3.5 out of 5 stars. He described it as a "refreshingly straight-forward, earnest homage to goofy, animal-themed horror." He also praised the film's 2020s setting in pandemic-era New Zealand for exploring topics such as genetic engineering, conspiracy theories, misinformation, pandemics and the cultural gulf between generations. Jancic praised the joke-laden screenplay and the special effects work provided by Wētā Workshop. He also praised the performances of Tabatha Killick as the protagonist Oats, Heather O'Carroll as the antagonistic cult leader Colleen, and Joe Witkowski as Oats's comedic companion.

James Croot of The Post gave the film a positive review, as well, describing it as "a Kiwi splatter sequel ewe'll enjoy." He also awarded it 3.5 out of 5 stars.
