= The Chapel (film) =

- Film poster
- Spanish: La ermita
- Directed by: Carlota Pereda
- Written by: Albert Bertran; Carmelo Viera; Carlota Pereda
- Produced by: Carlos Fernández; Laura Fernández Brites; Iñaki Gómez; Pablo Echart
- Starring: Belén Rueda; Maia Zaitegi; Josean Bengoetxea; Loreto Mauleón; Jon Olivares; Elena Irureta
- Cinematography: Rita Noriega
- Edited by: David Pelegrín
- Music by: Pascal Gaigne
- Production companies: Filmax; Bixagu Entertainment
- Distributed by: Filmax
- Release dates: 12 October 2023 (Sitges); 17 November 2023 (Spain)
- Country: Spain
- Language: Spanish

The Chapel (Spanish: La ermita) is a 2023 Spanish supernatural drama film directed by Carlota Pereda and co-written by Albert Bertran, Carmelo Viera, and Pereda which stars Belén Rueda and Maia Zaitegi.

== Plot ==
8-year-old Emma seeks guidance and help from false medium Carol to contact with the ghost of a girl trapped in a chapel, so Emma could be able to communicate with her terminally-ill mother once she dies.

== Cast ==
- Maia Zaitegi as Emma
- Belén Rueda as Carol
- Josean Bengoetxea as Jon Elorza
- Loreto Mauleón as Maider
- Jon Olivares as Asier
- Elena Irureta as Edurne
- Nagore Aranburu as Ivana Peralta

== Production ==
The film was co-written by Albert Bertran Bas, Carmelo Viera, and Carlota Pereda. It is a Filmax and Bixagu Entertainment production, and it had the participation of Netflix, RTVE, and EiTB, and backing from ICAA and Creative Europe MEDIA. Shot in between the Basque Country and Navarre, filming locations included Usurbil and Leitza.

== Release ==
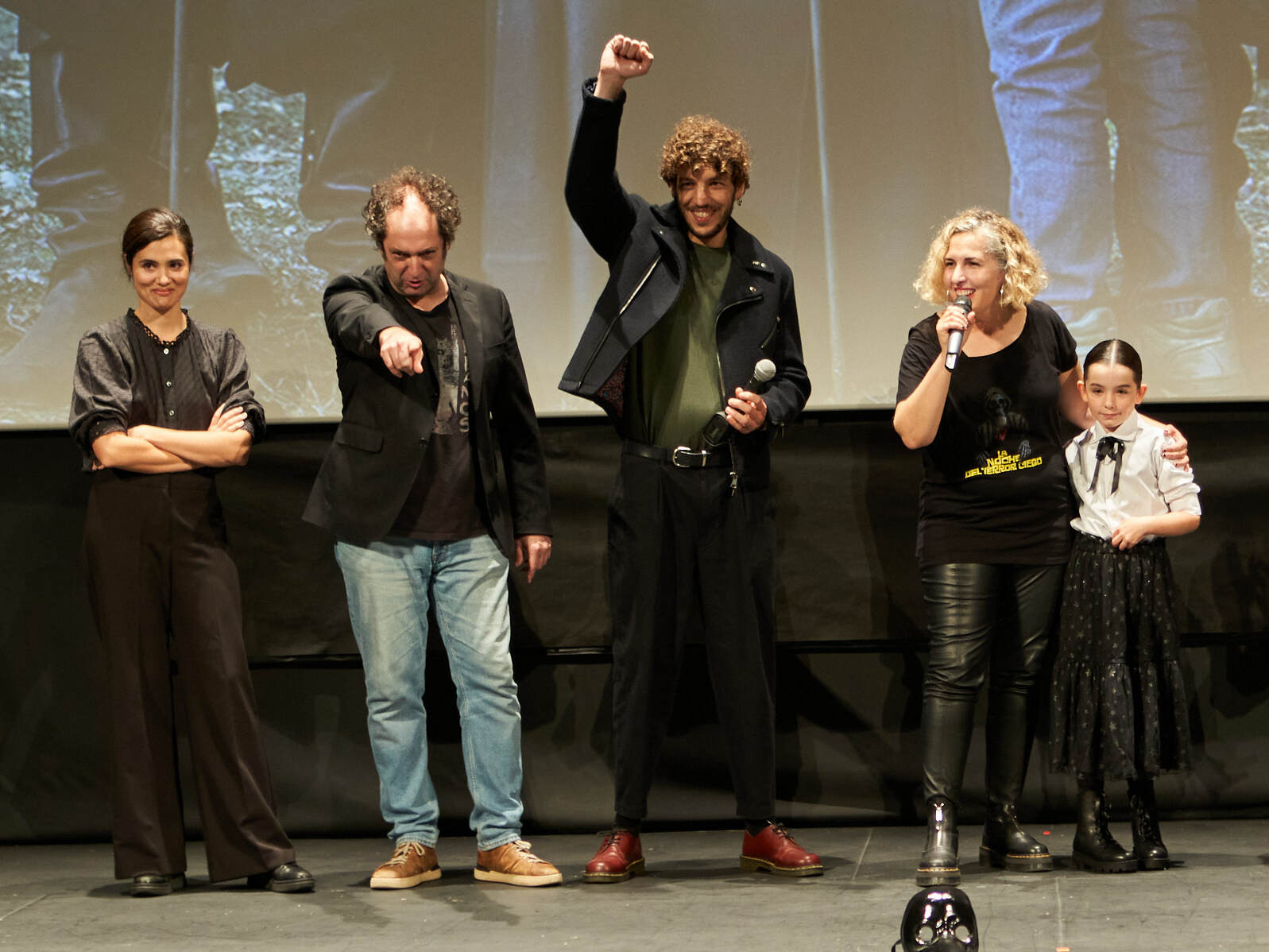
Mauleón, Bengoetxea, Olivares, Pereda, and Zaitegi during the presentation of the film at the 2023 San Sebastian Horror and Fantasy Film Festival

The Chapel was presented at the 56th Sitges Film Festival on 12 October 2023. It was released theatrically in Spain on 17 November 2023. The film had its North American premiere at the 28th Fantasia International Film Festival on July 23, 2024.

== Reception ==
Miguel Ángel Romero of Cinemanía rated the film 3 out of 5 stars, considering that starting with a powerful idea, the film becomes less and less effective as it progresses, being a more than worthy film notwithstanding.

José Luis Losa of La Voz de Galicia assessed that the film never works either as an emotional drama or as a horror film.

== Accolades ==
Year	Award	Category	Nominee(s)	Result	Ref.
2024	38th Goya Awards	Best Special Effects	Eneritz Zapiain, Iñaki Gil "Ketxu"	Nominated	

== See also ==
- List of Spanish films of 2023
