= Jonathan King (film director) =

New Zealand film director (born 1967)

- Born: 1967 (age 58–59)
- Occupations: Film director, producer, screenwriter
- Notable work: Black Sheep
- Spouse: Rebecca Priestley
- Father: Michael King
- Relatives: Rachael King (sister)

Jonathan King (born 1967) is a New Zealand film director, producer, and screenwriter. He is the son of historian Michael King and brother of author Rachael King.

== Biography ==
King began his screening career as writer and director of the New Zealand black comedy movie Black Sheep and was in 2007 co-writer of the screenplay for The Tattooist. His most recent project is a feature-length remake of the New Zealand television series Under the Mountain, as writer (adapting from the original book by Maurice Gee), director and producer.

He has also written and illustrated a graphic novel, Inkberg Enigma, which was published in 2020 by Gecko Press. It was shortlisted for the 2021 Junior Fiction and the Best First Book awards at the New Zealand Book Awards for Children and Young Adults.

He is married to academic and writer Rebecca Priestley.

== Filmography ==
Year	Film	Credited as			Role
Year	Film	Director	Writer	Producer	Role
1997	Bike - Tears Were Blue (short film)	Yes			
2006	Black Sheep	Yes	Yes		
2007	The Tattooist		Yes		Co-Writer
2009	Under the Mountain	Yes	Yes	Yes	Screenplay
2014	Realiti	Yes		Yes	
2025	The Second Grimoire (short film)	Yes	Yes	Yes	
2026	Black Sheeps	Yes	Yes	Yes	

== Publications ==
- 2020 – Inkberg Enigma, ISBN 9781776572663
