= Carlota Pereda =

Spanish director and screenwriter

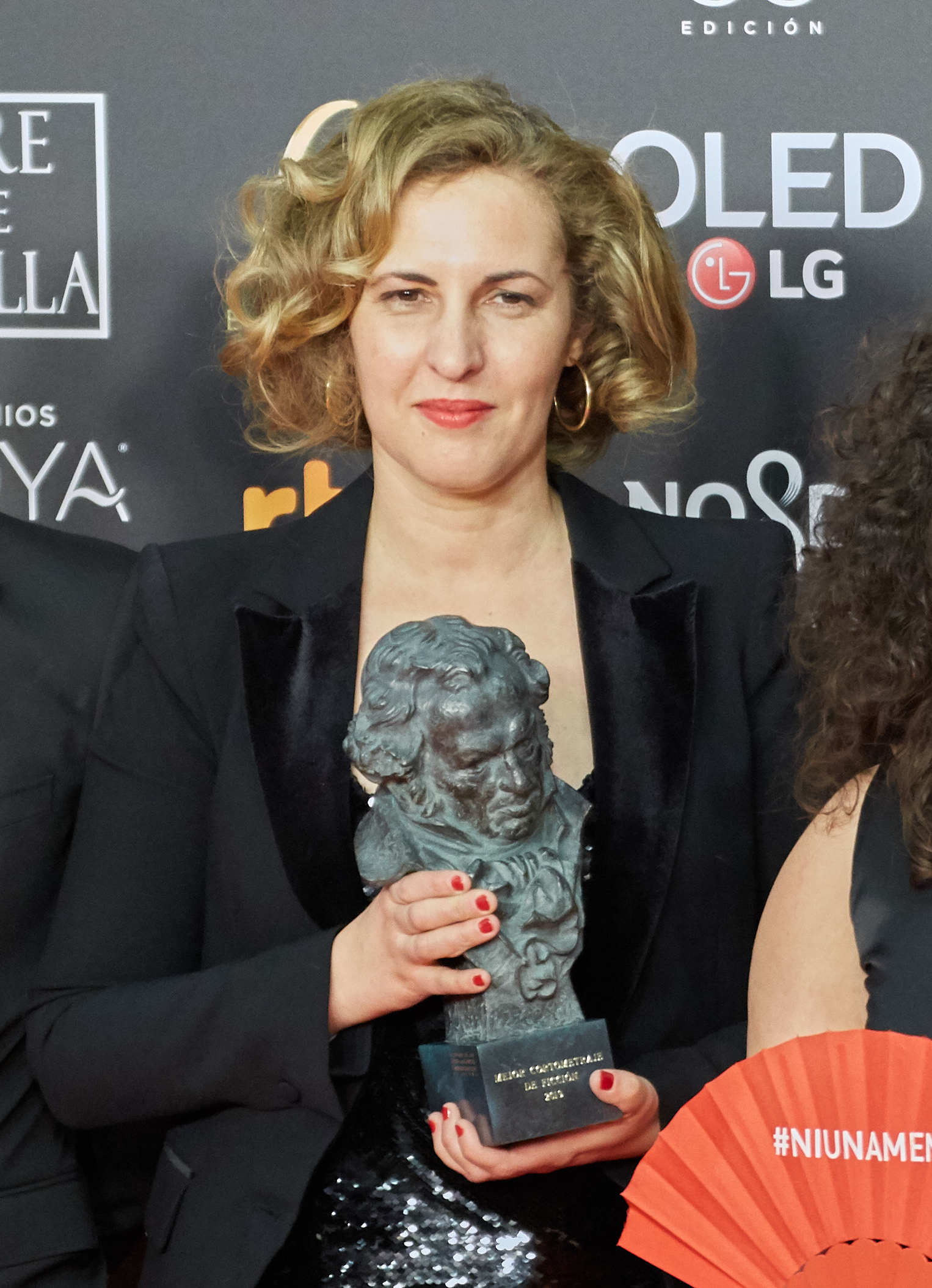
- Pereda in 2019
- Born: 1975 (age 50–51); Madrid, Spain
- Occupations: Film director; screenwriter

Carlota Pereda (born 1975) is a Spanish film and television director and screenwriter.

== Biography ==
Carlota Pereda was born in Madrid in 1975. She studied at the ECAM. She began her career in television, developing scripts for Periodistas. She went on to collaborate in different capacities (including screenwriting and direction) in other television shows such as Mis adorables vecinos, Los hombres de Paco, Águila Roja, Luna, el misterio de Calenda, B&b, de boca en boca, El secreto de Puente Viejo, and Acacias 38.

Her first short film was Las rubias ('The Blondes'). Her sophomore short film, Cerdita, won the Forqué Award and the Goya Award for Best Short Film. Another short film, There Will Be Monsters, followed. She adapted Cerdita to a full-length format in her debut feature, Piggy (2022), which won the Méliès d'Or. In October 2022, she began shooting of her second feature, The Chapel. In 2024, she was reported as the creator and showrunner of vampire dramedic thriller television series Death to Love. Her English-language debut feature Found Alive opened the 59th Sitges Film Festival.

== Filmography ==
- Las rubias (2016)
- Cerdita (2018)
- There Will Be Monsters (2020)
- Piggy (2022)
- The Chapel (2023)
- Found Alive (2026)
