= American Dollhouse =

- Directed by: John Valley
- Written by: John Valley
- Produced by: David Axe; Samuel Butler; Shane Greb; Christian Sosa; Jon Wroblewski
- Starring: Richard C. Jones; Hailley Lauren; Danielle Evon Ploeger; Kelsey Pribilski; Tinus Seaux
- Cinematography: Taylor Camarot
- Edited by: Samuel Butler
- Music by: Richard Hamilton
- Production company: Roosevelt Film Lab
- Release date: March 14, 2026 (SXSW)
- Running time: 88 minutes
- Country: United States
- Language: English

American Dollhouse is a 2026 American Christmas horror film written and directed by John Valley. It stars Richard C. Jones, Hailley Lauren, Danielle Evon Ploeger, Kelsey Pribilski, and Tinus Seaux. Its plot is about a woman buried under debt and addiction who inherits her childhood home, only to find her Christmas transformed into a nightmare by a psychotic neighbor.

== Cast ==
- Richard C. Jones
- Hailley Lauren
- Danielle Evon Ploeger
- Kelsey Pribilski
- Tinus Seaux

== Production ==
The film was produced by David Axe, Samuel Butler, Shane Greb, Jon Wroblewski, and Christian Sosa of Roosevelt Film Lab. Amado DeHoyos, Richard C. Jones, Shane Greb, Stephan Jensen, Elizabeth Spear, Hector Acosta, Dan Lenker, Zebulon “Ziggy” Griggs, and Melissa Sellers Drake serve as executive producers.

Taylor Camarot handled the cinematography, Richard Hamilton composed the music, Mairin Hamilton provided vocals, and Liam Turnage provided drums.

== Release ==
The film had its world premiere on March 14, 2026 in the Midnighters section of the SXSW 2026 Film Festival.

It will be screened in the Panorama section of the 59th Sitges Film Festival in October 2026.

== Reception ==
Brynn Dominguez of The Daily Texan gave the film a positive review (a rating of 4.5/5), writing: "American Dollhouse, does not represent your typical haunted house, possessed horror movie, but a film that surprises with plot twists, jump scares and a carefully crafted score."

J Hurtado of ScreenAnarchy had a mixed reaction towards the film, and wrote: "American Dollhouse is a fun but ultimately somewhat forgettable ride, combining elements we’ve all seen before into what is probably the grimiest package of this year’s SXSW."

Matthew Orozco of Macabre Daily gave the film a mixed-to-positive feedback, and wrote: "American Dollhouse is a blood-filled descent into the home of a madwoman, and it exposes the darkness of neighborly domesticity while never leaning too hard on metaphor and mental health to excuse or even explain the actions of its characters. While it may be too much for some squeamish viewers, those who enjoy the absurd and the audacious will likely find lots to love in one of 2026’s best indie horror films yet!"
