= 11 (film) =

2026 Spanish horror film

- Theatrical release poster
- Directed by: Clàudia and Paula Serra
- Screenplay by: Clara Esteban; Pau Pujol; Andrea Martínez
- Produced by: David Matamoros; Ángeles Hernández; Pau Riera
- Starring: Mia Sala-Patau; Pablo Scapigliati; Matías Zocca; Jael Borrás
- Edited by: Didac Palou
- Production companies: Contraban Produccions; Mr. Miyagi Films; Aramos Cine
- Distributed by: Alfa Pictures
- Release dates: 12 October 2026 (Sitges); 6 November 2026 (Spain)
- Running time: 89 minutes
- Countries: Spain; Argentina; Andorra
- Language: Catalan

11 is a 2026 horror thriller film directed by Clàudia and Paula Serra in their directorial debut. A co-production among Spain, Argentina and Andorra, it follows eight scouts and their two leaders who reach a mountain shelter in the Pyrenees, but a sudden snowstorm traps them there with no way to communicate or leave.

The film had its world premiere in Official Fantastic In-Competition Selection on 12 October 2026 at the 59th Sitges Film Festival. The film will be released in Spanish theatres by Alfa Pictures on 6 November 2026.

== Synopsis ==
The film follows eight young scouts, aged around 12 or 13, who go to spend a weekend at a mountain shelter in the Pyrenees with two instructors. A powerful snowstorm traps them inside, leaving them without electricity, water, or communication with the outside world. As the group tries to keep track of everyone, they discover that an unfamiliar boy has somehow joined them, despite no one seeing him enter. His strange and increasingly aggressive behavior causes suspicion and fear among the children. As the storm intensifies, the group must face a growing threat inside the isolated shelter, where the cold is not their only danger.

== Cast ==
- Mia Sala-Patau
- Pablo Scapigliati
- Matías Zocca
- Jael Borrás
- Abel Amigó
- Marc Vila

== Production ==
The film was in post-production after filming was wrapped up in April 2026.

In 2026, the film was presented by The Yellow Affair at the Cannes Film Market, an annual marketplace for films held in conjunction with 2026 Cannes Film Festival from 13 to 21 May.

== Release ==
11 premiered in Official Fantastic In-Competition Selection in October 2026 at the 59th Sitges Film Festival.

The film will be released in Spanish theatres by Alfa Pictures on 6 November 2026.

Finland based sales company The Yellow Affair acquired the international sales rights of the film.

== See also ==
- List of Spanish films of 2026
