= Rebecca Priestley =

New Zealand academic, science historian and writer

Rebecca Priestley CRSNZ
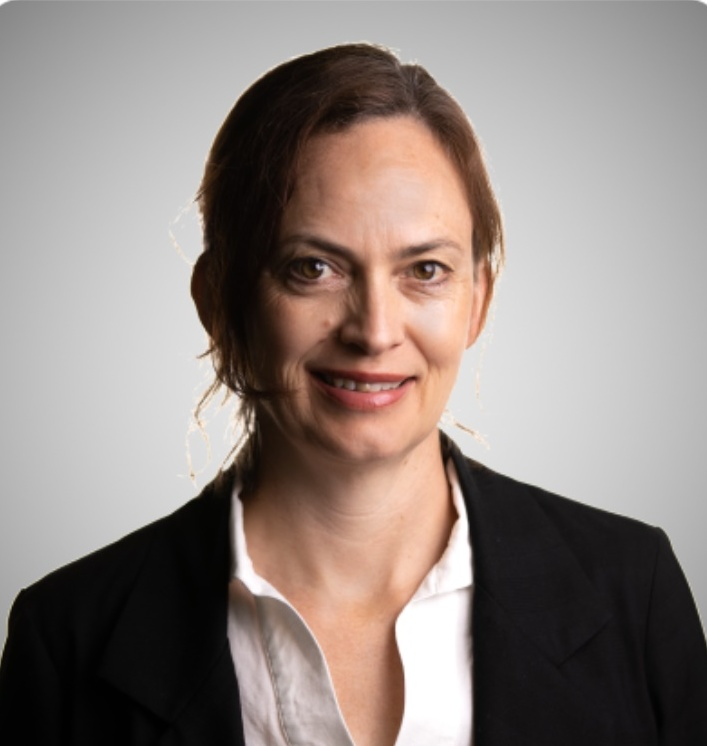
- Priestley in 2019
- Education: University of Canterbury, Victoria University of Wellington
- Spouse: Jonathan King
- Children: 3
- Awards: Prime Minister’s Science Communicator’s Prize 2016
- Scientific career
- Fields: Science communication
- Workplaces: Victoria University of Wellington
- Doctoral advisor: John Hearnshaw; Philippa Mein Smith; Philip Catton

Rebecca Katherine Priestley CRSNZ is a New Zealand academic, science historian, and writer. She is Professor in Science in Society at Victoria University of Wellington.

== Education ==
Priestley earned a BSc in geology at Victoria University of Wellington (VUW) in 1990, a Bsc (Hons), First Class, in physical geography at VUW in 1992, and a PhD in history and philosophy of science from the University of Canterbury in 2010 with a thesis titled Nuclear New Zealand: New Zealand's nuclear and radiation history to 1987, supervised by Philip Catton, John Hearnshaw and Philippa Mein Smith.

== Academic career ==
Priestley is a Professor in Science in Society at Victoria University of Wellington, where she teaches undergraduate courses in science communication and creative science writing, and leads a Master of Science in Society programme.

The three areas of Priestley's research are: 20th-century history of science, with a focus on science in New Zealand and Antarctica; science communication and public engagement with science; and creative science writing practice. Priestley took a sabbatical to do a Master of Arts in creative writing at the International Institute of Modern Letters (IIML), in the nonfiction stream, writing a book about Antarctica.

Priestley co-founded the Centre for Science in Society at Victoria University which focuses on the relationship between science, scientists, society, the history of science, and the communication of scientific ideas and issues to different audiences using the vast range of media sources available today.

She was the 2016 winner of the Prime Minister's Science Communicator's Prize. In June 2017, Priestley co-founded the Aotearoa New Zealand Science Journalism Fund, which offers funding for projects reporting on science-related issues of importance to New Zealanders.

In July 2018, Priestley was elected as a Companion of the Royal Society Te Apārangi.

== Selected works ==
- Dispatches from Continent Seven: an anthology of Antarctic science, Priestley, R. (Ed.). (2016), Wellington, New Zealand: Awa Press.
- The Fukushima Effect in New Zealand: a historical perspective from a 'nuclear-free' country, Priestley, R. (2016). In Hindmarsh, R., & Priestley, R. (Eds.), The Fukushima Effect: a new geopolitical terrain. New York, USA, London, UK: Routledge.
- Mad on Radium: New Zealand in the Atomic Age, Priestley, R. (2012). Auckland, New Zealand: Auckland University Press.
- The Awa Book of New Zealand Science, Priestley, R. (Ed.). (2008), Wellington, New Zealand: Awa Press.
- Atoms, dinosaurs & DNA: 68 great New Zealand scientists, Meduna, V., & Priestley, R. (2008), Auckland, New Zealand: Random House.

== Awards ==
- 2009 Winner, Royal Society of New Zealand Science Book Prize
- 2016 Winner, Prime Minister’s Science Communicator’s Prize
- 2009 Award, Storylines Children’s Literature Charitable Trust notable books
- 2009 Winner, LIANZA Elsie Locke Non-Fiction Award
