= Ángel Sala =

Director of Sitges Film Festival

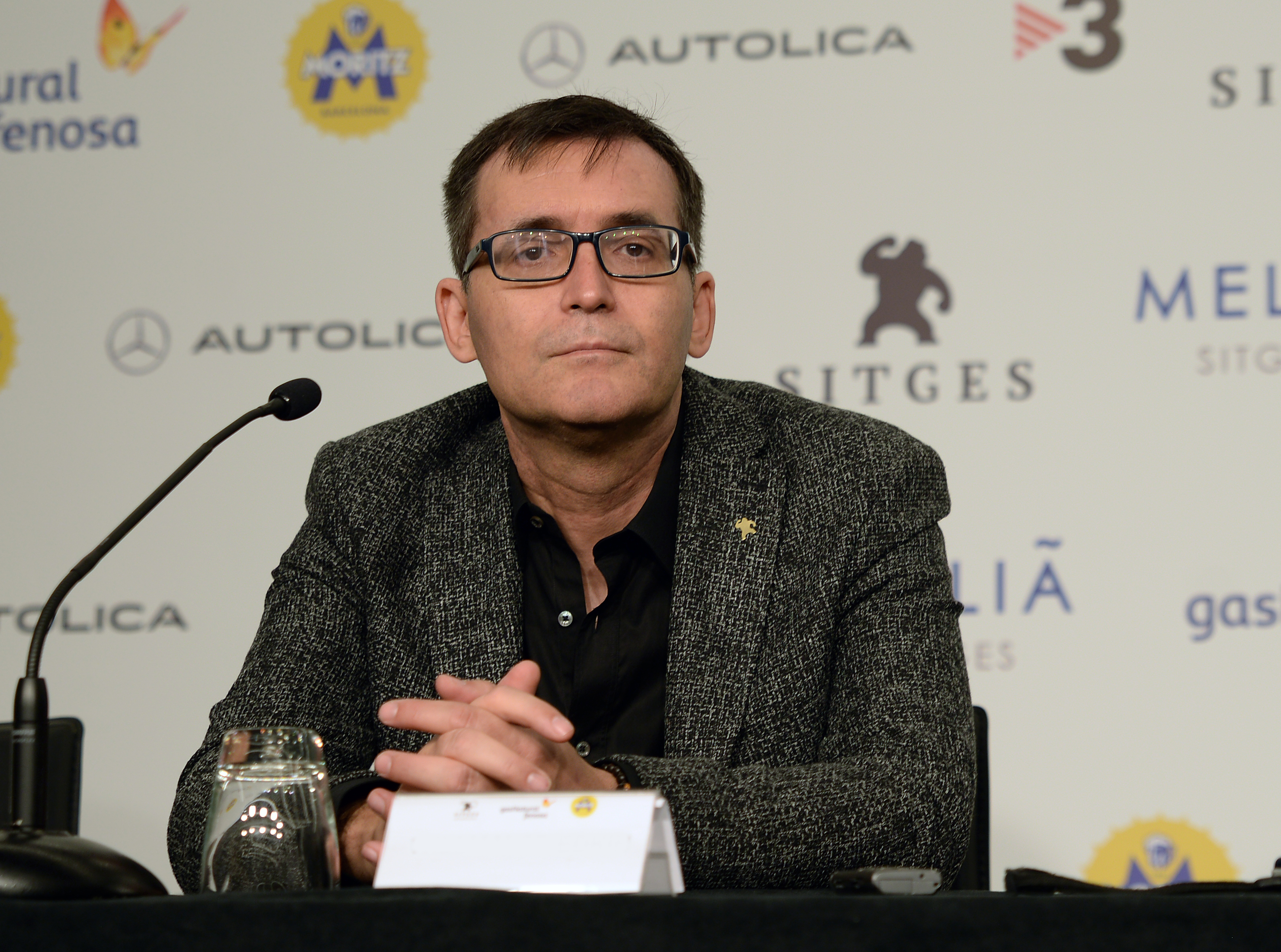
- Ángel Sala during the Sitges Film Festival of 2017
- Born: Àngel Sala; 1964 (age 61–62); Barcelona, Catalonia, Spain
- Occupations: Writer, screenwriter and film critic

Ángel Sala (born 1964) is the director of the Sitges Film Festival.

A Serbian Film was banned by a court in San Sebastián, Spain for "threatening sexual freedom" and thus could not be shown in the XXI Semana de Cine Fantástico y de Terror (21st Horror and Fantasy Film Festival). The film was shown at an adults-only screening at the Spanish Sitges Film Festival during October 2010. As a result, the festival's director Ángel Sala was charged with exhibiting child pornography by the Spanish prosecutor who decided to take action in May 2011 after receiving a complaint from a Roman Catholic organization over a pair of scenes involving the rapes of a young child and a newborn. The charges were later dropped.

Paradoxically, film was awarded in others festivals like the Fantasporto in Porto, Portugal. Film was presented in 40 countries, and only in Spain had this problem.

Several directors of different film festivals (Sevilla, San Sebastián, Valladolid, Málaga, Pamplona, Huelva and Granada, etc.) sent letters to Salas showing their support.

He has written several books about films. It includes Tiburón: Vas a necesitar un barco más grande!: el filme que cambió Hollywood (2005), about the film Jaws (1975); Profanando el sueño de los muertos: la historia jamás contada del cine fantástico español (2010), about Spanish cinema; and Just imagine: 50 títulos esenciales del cine de ciencia ficción (2017), about science fiction films.

== Filmography ==
- Herederos de la bestia (2016)
