= Michael King (historian) =

New Zealand historian and writer

Michael King OBE
- King in 1992
- Born: 15 December 1945; Wellington, New Zealand
- Died: 30 March 2004 (aged 58) near Maramarua, Waikato, New Zealand
- Education: Victoria University of Wellington, University of Waikato
- Occupations: Historian, biographer
- Relatives: Jonathan King (son); Rachael King (daughter)
- Writing career
- Notable work: The Penguin History of New Zealand
- Notable awards: Officer of the Order of the British Empire (1988); Prime Minister's Award for Literary Achievement (2003)

Michael King OBE (15 December 1945 – 30 March 2004) was a New Zealand historian, author, and biographer. He wrote or edited over 30 books on New Zealand topics, including the best-selling Penguin History of New Zealand, which was the most popular New Zealand book of 2004.

== Life ==
King was born in Wellington, one of four children to Eleanor and Lewis King, and grew up at Paremata. His Glasgow-born father was an advertising executive who had left New Zealand to serve as a naval officer in World War II and had risen to the rank of lieutenant-commander. King's family moved to Auckland for a while, where he attended Sacred Heart College, then returned to Wellington, where he attended St Patrick's College, Silverstream in Upper Hutt. He studied history at Victoria University of Wellington, working part-time for the Evening Post, and graduated with a BA in 1967. He married Ros Henry in 1967. They moved to Hamilton, where King worked full-time as a journalist at the Waikato Times newspaper from 1968 to 1971, covering Māori issues, and also earned an MA in history at the University of Waikato in 1968. He spent three years from 1972 as a journalism tutor at Wellington Polytechnic, before becoming a self-employed writer. He returned to the University of Waikato in 1977 to complete a doctoral thesis on Te Puea Herangi, and was awarded a DPhil in 1978. In 1997 he received an honorary DLitt at Victoria. He was visiting professor of New Zealand Studies at Georgetown University in Washington, D.C., and taught or held fellowships at six other universities.

Although not Māori himself, King was well known for his knowledge of Māori culture and history. New Zealand Listener, one of New Zealand's most popular weekly magazines, dubbed King "the people's historian" for his efforts to write about and for the local populace. As a biographer, King published works on Te Puea Herangi, Whina Cooper, Frank Sargeson (1995) and Janet Frame (2000). As a historian, King's works include Being Pākehā (1985), Moriori (1989), and The Penguin History of New Zealand (July 2003), the latter of which was, by February 2004, into its seventh edition. In all, King wrote, co-wrote and edited more than 30 books on a diverse range of New Zealand topics. He contributed to all five volumes of the Dictionary of New Zealand Biography.

King was always sensitive to the fact that he was a Pākehā writing about the Māori world and always sought to establish close personal relationships with those he wrote about and their whānau, hapū and iwi authorities. He believed that all Pākehā had the same right to be called indigenous as Māori and disagreed with claims that only Māori have a spiritual association with mountains, lakes and rivers. He noted a recent tendency in literature to romanticise Māori life and indicated that certain aspects of Māori society in the pre-European era were harsher and less humane than the results of British colonisation.

King's two children with his first wife Ros are the filmmaker Jonathan King and novelist Rachael King. The marriage ended amicably in 1974, while they were sharing a communal house with two other families. King was a diabetic and had post-polio syndrome. He received six weeks of chemotherapy and radiotherapy for throat cancer discovered in October 2003, which was in remission by 2004.

Following King's death, an essay of his on John Money was published in an exhibition catalogue for the Eastern Southland Gallery in Gore; King had wanted to write a full biography on Money, but had been unable to get a sufficient grant to do so.

== Death ==
King and his second wife, Maria Jungowska, were killed when their car crashed into a tree and caught fire near Maramarua, on State Highway 2 in north Waikato. The cause of the crash was a mystery at the time, but a coroner's inquest determined it was most likely caused by driver inattention.

== Honours and awards ==
In 1980, King won the Feltex television writers' award, and was awarded a Winston Churchill Fellowship. In the 1988 New Year Honours, he was appointed an Officer of the Order of the British Empire, for services to literature. Also in 1988, he received a Fulbright Visiting Writers' Fellowship.

He won several prizes at the New Zealand Book Awards: the award for non-fiction in 1978; the Wattie Book of the Year Award in 1984 and 1990; and in 2004 his book, The Penguin History of New Zealand, was overwhelmingly voted the readers' choice award winner. He received New Zealand Literary Fund awards in 1987 and 1989, and was the Burns Fellow at the University of Otago in 1998–1999.

King was winner of the 2003 Prime Minister's Award for Literary Achievement in non-fiction, and the same year The New Zealand Herald named him New Zealander of the Year.

== Legacy ==
New Zealand’s largest writing fellowship is the Creative New Zealand Michael King Writers’ Fellowship, it "supports established writers to work on a major project over two or more years". Past fellows are: Owen Marshall, Vincent O’Sullivan, CK Stead, Rachel Barrowman, Neville Peat, Fiona Kidman, Philip Simpson and in 2023 Danny Keenan.

The Michael King Writers Centre was established shortly after his death. Based at the historic Signalman's House in Devonport, Auckland, the centre offers writing residencies for early career and experienced writers.

== Bibliography ==
- Moko: Maori Tattooing in the 20th Century (1972)
- Make it News: how to approach the media (1974)
- Face Value: a study in Maori portraiture (1975)
- Te Ao Hurihuri: Aspects of Maoritanga (ed.) (1975)
- Te Puea: a biography (1977)
- Tihe Mauri Ora: Aspects of Maoritanga (ed.) (1978)
- New Zealand: Its Land and Its People (1979)
- The Collector: A Biography of Andreas Reischek (1981)
- Being Maori – John Rangihau (1981)
- New Zealanders at War (1981)
- A Place to Stand: a history of Turangawaewae Marae (1981)
- G.F. von Tempsky, Artist and Adventurer (with Rose Young) (1981)
- New Zealand in Colour (1982)
- Maori: A Photographic and Social History (1983)
- Whina: A Biography of Whina Cooper (1983)
- Te Puea Herangi: from darkness to light (1984)
- Being Pakeha: An Encounter with New Zealand and the Maori Renaissance (1985)
- Auckland (with Eric Taylor) (1985)
- Kawe Korero: A guide to reporting Maori activities (1985)
- Death of the Rainbow Warrior (1986)
- New Zealand (1987)
- After the War: New Zealand since 1945 (1988)
- One of the Boys?: changing views of masculinity in New Zealand (1988)
- Apirana Ngata: e tipu e rea (1988)
- Moriori: A People Rediscovered (1989)
- A Land Apart: The Chatham Islands of New Zealand (1990)
- Pākehā: The quest for identity in New Zealand (1991)
- Hidden Places: A Memoir in Journalism (1992)
- Coromandel (1993)
- Frank Sargeson: A Life (1995)
- God's Farthest Outpost: A History of Catholics in New Zealand (research by Merle van de Klundert) (1997), ISBN 0-670-87652-6
- Nga Iwi o te Motu: One thousand years of Maori history (1997)
- Being Pākehā Now: reflections and recollections of a white native (1999)
- Wrestling with the Angel: A Life of Janet Frame (2000)
- Tomorrow Comes the Song: A Life of Peter Fraser (with Michael Bassett) (2000)
- Tread Softly For You Tread On My Life: new & collected writings (2001)
- An Inward Sun: The World of Janet Frame (2002)
- At the Edge of Memory: A family story (2002)
- Penguin History of New Zealand (2003)
- The Silence Beyond (2011) (selected writings)

== See also ==
- New Zealand literature
