= Titanic Ocean =

2026 film by Konstantina Kotzamani

- Directed by: Konstantina Kotzamani
- Written by: Konstantina Kotzamani
- Produced by: Maria Drandaki; Nina Frese; Radu Stancu; Luisa Romeo; Konishi Keisuke; Hiroto Ogi
- Cinematography: Raphaël Vandenbussche
- Edited by: Livia Neroutsopoulou; Julie Wuillai; Vincent Tricon
- Music by: Patricia Ferragud
- Production company: Homemade Films
- Release date: 20 May 2026 (Cannes)
- Running time: 130 minutes
- Countries: Greece; Germany; Romania; France; Spain; Japan
- Language: Japanese

Titanic Ocean is a 2026 fantasy drama film written and directed by Konstantina Kotzamani, in her directorial debut. It follows a group of teenage girls at a Japanese boarding school as they train to become professional mermaids. It is an international co-production of Greece, Germany, Romania, France, Spain, and Japan.

The film had its world premiere in the Un Certain Regard section of the 2026 Cannes Film Festival on 20 May, where it was nominated for Caméra d'Or.

== Premise ==
A seventeen-year-old girl enrolls in a special boarding school that trains teenage girls to become professional mermaids, where she undergoes a personal transformation and discovers more about herself.

== Cast ==
- Arisa Sasaki
- Melina Mardini
- Haruna Matsui
- Hanna Muro
- Aki Kigoshi
- Sei Matobu

== Production ==
In 2018, Titanic Ocean participated at the FeatureLab section of the TorinoFilmLab. The project was also presented at the CineMart in January 2019, held during the International Film Festival Rotterdam. In November 2020, it received a production grant from the Hellenic Broadcasting Corporation. It participated at the International Film Festival and Awards Macao Market in December 2020 and won the Creative Excellence Award. It was selected to participate at the 2022 Venice Gap-Financing Market. In December 2022, it received a €500,000 production grant from Eurimages. In 2023, Kotzamani participated at the Next Step programme held during the Critics' Week of the Cannes Film Festival.

== Release ==
Titanic Ocean had its world premiere at the Un Certain Regard section of the 2026 Cannes Film Festival on 20 May, where it was nominated for Caméra d'Or. In January 2026, Paradise City Sales had acquired the film's international sales.

== Reception ==
Titanic Ocean received mixed reviews from critics, with several praising its distinctive visual style while criticizing its narrative and pacing.

Diego Lerer of Micropsia interpreted the film as a fable of female empowerment, describing metamorphosis as its central metaphor and highlighting its themes of self-discovery and transformation. Marcio Sallem of Cinema com Crítica similarly acknowledged the film's hypnotic qualities, originality and singular universe, but ultimately found it frustrating for failing to explore the emotional depths of its protagonist.

Other critics were more critical of the film's storytelling. Pavel Snapkou of Showbiz by PS praised its dreamy imagery but argued that its 130-minute running time stretched a story that could have been told much more concisely, suggesting that the filmmakers prioritized beautiful visuals over a coherent narrative. Risa Bolash of The Rolling Tape also praised the film's colorful aesthetic and cool-toned visuals, but concluded that these elements could not compensate for its slow pace and meandering plot.
