= Found Alive (2026 film) =

- Directed by: Carlota Pereda
- Written by: Lori Evans Taylor; Matt Venne
- Based on: The Edge of Normal by Carla Norton
- Produced by: Nate Bolotin; Matt Miller; Andrew Deane; Ava Jamshidi
- Starring: Chloë Grace Moretz; Scott Haze; Rupert Friend; Thomas Cocquerel
- Cinematography: Rita Noriega
- Edited by: David Pelegrín
- Music by: Yair Elazar Glotman
- Production companies: XYZ Films; Vanishing Angle; Industry Entertainment; Nostromo Pictures
- Release date: October 8, 2026 (Sitges)
- Running time: 96 minutes
- Countries: United States; Spain
- Language: English

Found Alive is a 2026 Spanish-American thriller film directed by Carlota Pereda and written by Matt Venne with revisions by Lori Evans Taylor, based on the 2013 novel The Edge of Normal by Carla Norton. It stars Chloë Grace Moretz, Scott Haze, Rupert Friend, and Thomas Cocquerel. The film was produced by Nate Bolotin, Matt Miller, Andrew Deane, and Ava Jamshidi.

The film's world premiere took place on October 8, 2026, as the opening film of the 59th Sitges Film Festival, where it competed for the Best Film Award as an Official Fantastic In-Competition Selection.

== Premise ==
Reeve LeClaire (Moretz) is still haunted from when she was held captive as a teenager by a sadistic man, but when her psychiatrist (Friend) asks her to mentor a newly rescued survivor, she’s pulled into a chilling game of cat-and-mouse—one that threatens to drag her back into the nightmare she barely escaped.

== Cast ==
- Chloë Grace Moretz as Reeve LeClaire
- Scott Haze as Duke Morrison
- Rupert Friend as Dr. Ezra Learner
- Thomas Cocquerel as Nick Hudson
- Charlotte Hemmings as Emily Ellings
- Chelsea Gilson as Heather P Jennsen
- Trevor Snarr as Simon Pelt

== Production ==
In 2015, it was announced that Bold Films would be developing the thriller The Edge of Normal as a feature film after outbidding other potential buyers for Matt Venne's script, which was based on Carla Norton's 2013 novel of the same name. Michel Litvak, Matthew Rhodes, Andrew Deane, and Lisa Zambri were set to produce with Gary Michael Walters and Ava Jamshidi set to executive produce. This version of the project never materialized.

In March 2025, it was revealed that XYZ Films, Vanishing Angle, and Industry Entertainment (via Andrew Deane and Ava Jamshidi) were set to produce a feature film adaptation of Carla Norton's novel, The Edge of Normal, written by Matt Venne with revisions by Lori Evans Taylor. The film was to be directed by Carlota Pereda in her English-language film debut with Chloë Grace Moretz attached to star as Reeve LeClaire. Later that month, Rupert Friend was tapped to star opposite Moretz.

In May 2025, XYZ Films commenced sales in Cannes with the film set to begin production later that month in Utah. In June 2025, as production wrapped, it was disclosed that Scott Haze was also cast in the film. In February 2026, Thomas Cocquerel's role in the film was made known via an interview in Esquire.

In September 2026, the film was retitled Found Alive and announced as the opening film of the 59th Sitges Film Festival.
