= John Hearnshaw =

New Zealand astronomer (born 1946)

John Hearnshaw MNZM FRSNZ
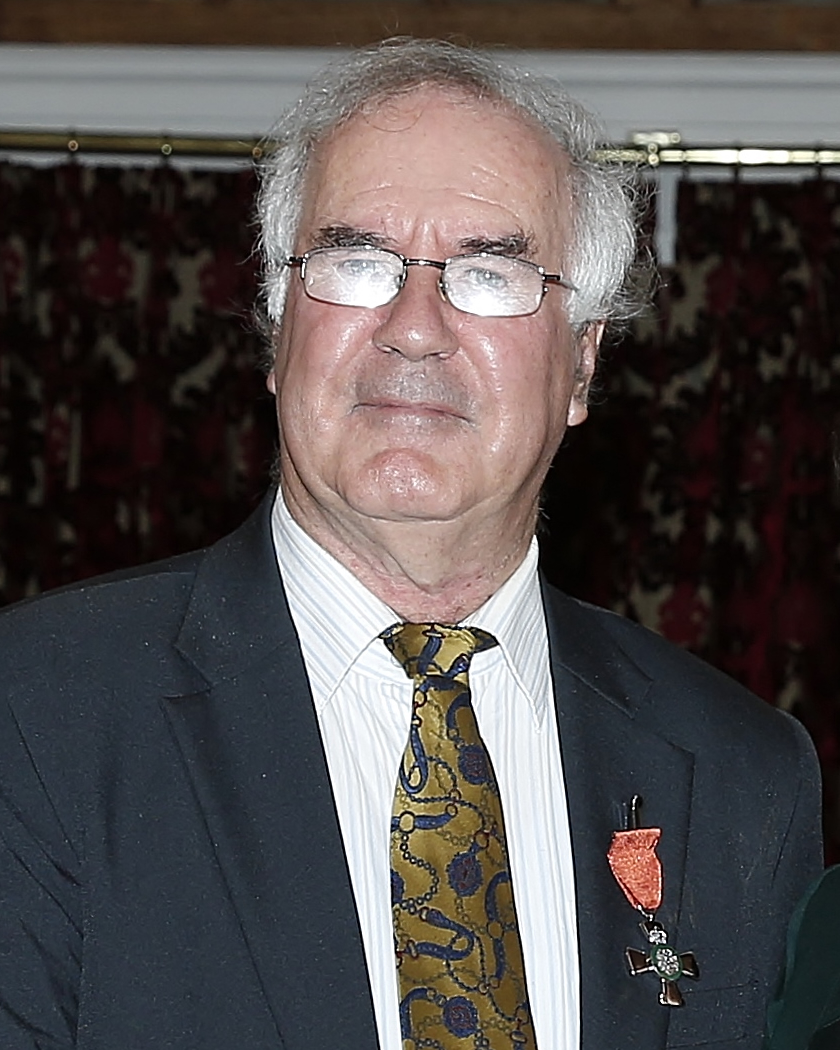
- Hearnshaw in 2018
- Born: John Bernard Hearnshaw; 16 March 1946 (age 80); Wellington, New Zealand
- Education: Trinity College, Cambridge; University of Cambridge; Australian National University; University of Canterbury
- Awards: Humboldt Fellowship (1981–82); Murray Geddes Prize from the Royal Astronomical Society of New Zealand (1986)
- Scientific career
- Fields: Astronomy
- Workplaces: University of Canterbury
- Doctoral students: Rebecca Priestley

John Bernard Hearnshaw MNZM FRSNZ (born 16 March 1946) is a New Zealand astronomer who is emeritus professor of astronomy at the University of Canterbury. He served as director of the Mt John University Observatory at the University of Canterbury from 1976 to 2008. He is a member of the International Astronomical Union and was president of its Commission 30 (on radial velocities) from 1997 to 2000. He is a fellow of the Royal Society of New Zealand and the Royal Astronomical Society of New Zealand. He was appointed a Member of the New Zealand Order of Merit, for services to astronomy, in the 2017 Queen's Birthday Honours. The minor planet 5207 Hearnshaw is named after him.

Notable students of Hearnshaw include Rebecca Priestley.

In 2024, Hearnshaw petitioned the New Zealand Parliament to enact a law limiting light pollution, highlighting its adverse effects on human health, native species, and the ability to view the night sky. In response, the parliamentary Petitions Committee recommended that the government investigate establishing national guidelines to curb the growth of artificial light at night.
