= F. J. C. Hearnshaw =

English professor of history (1869–1946)

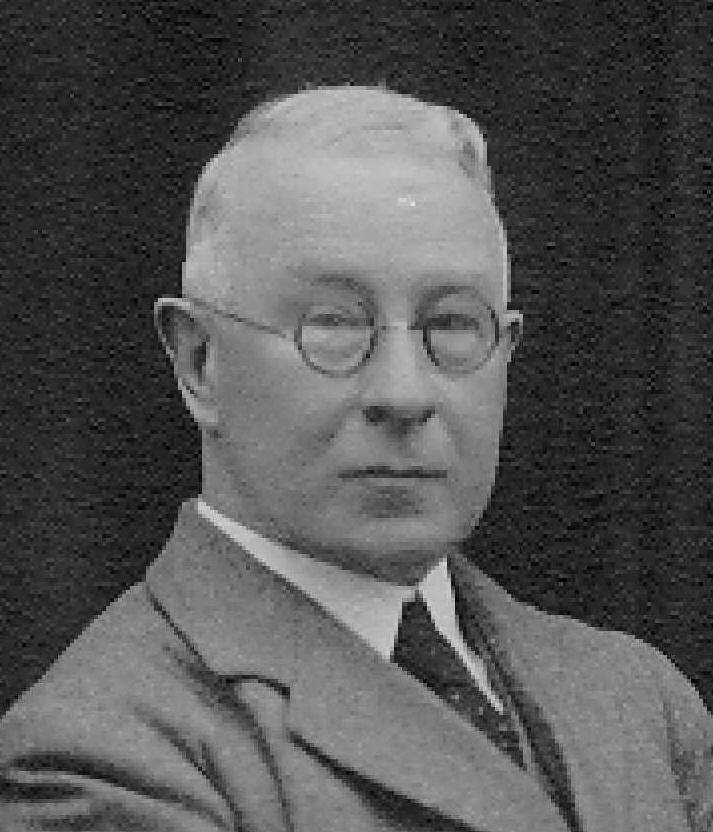
Fossey J. C. Hearnshaw

Fossey John Cobb (F. J. C.) Hearnshaw (31 July 1869 in Birmingham – 10 March 1946) was an English professor of history, specializing in medieval history. He was noted for his conservative interpretation of the past, showing an empire-oriented ideology in defence of hierarchical authority, paternalism, deference, the monarchy, Church, family, nation, status, and place. He was a Tory Democrat who sought to realize Disraeli's goal of preserving invaluable historic traditions while encouraging timely reforms. He believed that a meritocratic, small, effective elite should lead the weaker majority.

Educated at Walsall and Manchester Grammar Schools, he went on to the University of London (MA), Peterhouse, Cambridge, (Historical Scholar, MA and LL.M. 1900), and Trinity College, Dublin (LLD), Cambridge (LittD).

== Career ==
Hearnshaw was an external examiner in history at the University of London 1909-1913; Durham University 1912-1913; the Victoria University of Manchester 1914-1917; the University of Bristol 1921; the University of Wales 1930; professor of history at University College, Southampton, 1900-1910; professor of modern history at the Armstrong College of Durham University, 1910-1912; professor of medieval history at King's College London, 1912-1934; and Fellow of King's College London, 1926.

Hearnshaw also held the posts of honorary secretary of the Royal Historical Society, 1931-1934 and president of the Historical Association, 1936-1938.

== Publications ==
- England in the Making (1913)
- Freedom in Service: six essays on matters concerning Britain's safety and good government (1916)
- Democracy at the Crossways: a study in politics and history (1918) full text online
- Main Currents of European History, 1815-1915 (1918)
- Mediaeval Contributions to Modern Civilisation (1921)
- The Social and Political Ideas of some Great Mediaeval Thinkers (1923)
- The European Revolution and After, 1848-1854 (1923)
- The Development of Political Ideas (1927)
- A Survey of Socialism (1928)
- The “Ifs” of History (1929)
- The Centenary History of King's College London, 1828-1928 (G. G. Harrap & Co., London) (1929)
- Conservatism in England: an Analytical, Historical, and Political Survey (1933)
- Sea-power & Empire (1940)
- Germany the Aggressor Throughout the Ages (1940)
