= 74th San Sebastián International Film Festival =

2026 film festival

- Official poster featuring Ricardo Darín
- Opening film: Ghost Song
- Closing film: Le Faux Soir
- Location: San Sebastián, Spain
- Awards: Golden Shell: Tender Loving Care
- Directors: José Luis Rebordinos
- Festival date: 18–26 September 2026

San Sebastián International Film Festival
- 75th 73rd

The 74th San Sebastián International Film Festival took place from 18 to 26 September 2026 in San Sebastián, Gipuzkoa, Spain. Mike Leigh's Tender Loving Care won the Golden Shell, while Ah Biao's Border received the Special Jury Prize.

== Background ==
The 74th edition was the last under the direction of José Luis Rebordinos, who is set to be succeeded in January 2027 by Maialen Beloki (appointed in April 2026). The festival posters for the 74th edition (including the main one featuring Argentine actor and 2017 Donostia Award winner Ricardo Darín) were presented by Rebordinos and Beloki on 3 June 2026 at the Tabakalera cultural centre.

The Kursaal during the 2026 festival

An early batch of Spanish-produced films was announced on 17 July 2026 at the Spanish Film Academy headquarters. Additional official selection titles were disclosed on 28 July 2026. In August 2026, Werner Herzog was disclosed as the recipient of a Donostia Award. An additional slate of main competition films was announced on 14 August 2026. 'Perlak' titles were announced on 18 August 2026. The full lineup of 17 main competition titles was completed with the announcement of Ghost Song as the opening film. The non-competitive screening of Le Faux Soir was announced as the closing film. On 31 August 2026, the festival announced actress Naomi Watts as a second Donostia Award recipient together with the Donostia Award screening of The Housewife.

The 74th edition marked the introduction of a new official award for the Best Original Music among main competition entries, presented in tandem with SGAE.

The opening gala on 18 September was hosted by Fariba Sheikhan and Mariona Terés, and Orlando Bloom gifted Werner Herzog the Donostia Award. On 19 September, Ernest Urtasun presented the National Film Prize to Carmen Machi at Tabakalera. Likewise, J.A. Bayona presented Naomi Watts another Donostia Award. The ceremony was rounded up with the screening of Watts-led The Housewife. On 24 September, the festival unveiled Ink as the surprise film, with screenings programmed for 25 and 26 September.

The closing gala was hosted by Loreto Mauleón and Fernando Guallar.

== Juries ==
=== Official Selection jury ===
The official jury members are listed as follows:

- Ira Sachs, American filmmaker – Jury president
- Genki Kawamura, Japanese filmmaker and author
- Catherine Paillé, screenwriter
- Alice Braga, actress
- Patricia López Arnaiz, actress
- Bill Skarsgård, actor
- Mike Goodridge, producer

=== Other ===
- Kutxabank-New Directors Award: Juan Pablo Miller, Marina Charriton, Jonathan Romney; Dana Blankstein Cohen, Tamar Novas
- Horizontes Make & Mark Award: Agustina Llambi Campbell, Casimiro Torreiro Gómez, Jérôme Vidal
- Zabaltegi-Tabakalera Award : Mariette Rissenbeek, Ion de Sosa, Catarina Vasconcelos
- Irizar Basque Film Award: Marta Etura (President), Simon Blondeau, María Pilar Rodríguez
- SGAE Award for Best Original Music: Eva Gancedo, Aranzazu Calleja, Olivier Arson

== Sections ==
=== Official selection ===
==== In competition ====
Highlighted title indicates award winner.

English title	Original title	Director(s)	Production country(ies)
5 More Minutes	5 minutos más	Javier Ruiz Caldera	Spain
The Bad Father	El mal padre	Roberto Bueso	Spain
Border	边境	Ah Biao	Hong Kong; United States; South Korea
Brace Your Heart	Garrat du váimmu	Amanda Kernell	Sweden; Norway; Denmark; Iceland; Bulgaria
The Debut		Jesse Eisenberg	United States
Ghost Song	Geister	Fatih Akin	Germany
Glaxo		Benjamín Naishtat	Brazil; Argentina
Growth of the Soil	Markens Grøde	Hans Petter Moland	Norway; Denmark; Germany
In My Father's Room	無用の人	Maha Harada	Japan
Krux		Tony Vahl	Germany; Poland
Milo	7:40 ce matin-là	Nicole Garcia	France
Les Misérables		Fred Cavayé	France
My Sad Dead	Mis muertos tristes	Pablo Larraín	Argentina; Chile
On Behalf of My Son	Vicentina pede disculpas	Gabriel Martins	Brazil
Saints	Sants	Mikel Gurrea	Spain; Italy
Tender Loving Care		Mike Leigh	United Kingdom
What Remains	Artakalan	Yeşim Ustaoğlu	Turkey; France; Luxembourg; Bulgaria

==== Out of Competition ====
English title	Original title	Director(s)	Production country(ies)
The Castle (series)	El castillo	Elena Martín Gimeno, Sandra Romero	Spain
Le Faux Soir		Michaël R. Roskam	Belgium; France
Heart of the Beast		David Ayer	United States
Special Screenings
Bajañí		Fernando Trueba	Spain
Beyond Society	Más allá de la sociedad	Carlos Torres	Spain
The Harvester	Sacamantecas	David Pérez Sañudo	Spain; Belgium
The Last Goodbye	Azken agurra	Koldo Almandoz	Spain
Pray for Us	Ruega por nosotras	Daniel Monzón	Spain; France

=== New Directors ===
Highlighted title indicates award winner.

English title	Original title	Director(s)	Production country(ies)
The Bad Son	El mal hijo	Jaime Lorente	Spain
The Ballet Lesson		Kazuya Murayama	Japan
Body of Glass		Naëmi Ada	Germany; France
Cute		Marlene Emilie Lyngstad	Denmark; Sweden; Norway
Erratics	Bloques erráticos	Thomas Woodroffe	Chile; France; Argentina
February, Seven Days	Sieben Tage Februar	Tatjana Moutchnik	Germany; Austria; Spain
Florid		Billy Lumby	United Kingdom; Sweden
Lovers Sleep Alone		Massih Parsaei	Germany
Morro		Rodrigo García Sáiz	Mexico
Mugalim		Ayana Nurdinova	Kazakhstan
My Father's Shoes	Obuvkite na bashta mi	Hristo Simeonov	Bulgaria; France
This Solitude	Esta soledad	Javier Giner	Spain
Will You Still Be My Friend	日光	Lu Po-shun	Taiwan; Singapore
The World Before	첫세계	Yoon Dan-bi	South Korea; Japan; France

=== Latin Horizons (Horizontes latinos) ===
Highlighted title indicates award winner.

English title	Original title	Director(s)	Production country(ies)
Ashes	Ceniza en la boca	Diego Luna	Mexico; Spain
Cinco años, cuatro meses	Five Years, Four Months	Juan Miguel Gelacio, Esteban Hoyos García	Colombia; United States
Flies	Moscas	Fernando Eimbcke	Mexico; Spain
Forever Your Maternal Animal	Siempre soy tu animal materno	Valentina Maurel	Belgium; France; Mexico
The Illusion of an Everlasting Summer	La ilusión de un verano sin fin	Alessandra Sanguinetti	Argentina; United States
The Meltdown	El deshielo	Manuela Martelli	Chile; United States; Spain; Mexico
Narciso		Marcelo Martinessi	Paraguay; Spain; Uruguay; Brazil; Portugal; Germany; France
La perra		Dominga Sotomayor	Brazil; Chile
A Professora de Francês	The French Teacher	Ricardo Alves Jr.	Brazil; France; Portugal
The River Train	El tren fluvial	Lorenzo Ferro, Lucas A. Vignale	Argentina
Sad Girlz	Chicas tristes	Fernanda Tovar	Mexico; Spain; France
Six Months in a Pink and Blue Building	Seis meses en el edificio rosa con azul	Bruno Santamaría Razo	Mexico; Brazil; Denmark

=== Zabaltegi-Tabakalera ===
Highlighted title indicates award winner.

English title	Original title	Director(s)	Production country(ies)
Actress	Abhinetri	Tanmay Chowdhary, Tanvi Chowdhary	India
As a Cure		Sing Zhang	China; United Kingdom
La belle année		Angelica Ruffier	Sweden; Norway
Cine vivo: un artefacto		Albertina Carri	Argentina; Chile; Spain
Dust	La deriva	Tsai Ming-liang	Spain; Taiwan
Far From the Trees	Lejos de los árboles	Meritxell Colell Aparicio	Spain; Peru; Italy
Flamenco Sketches	Jaleos	Isaki Lacuesta	Spain
For the Opponents	Para los contrincantes	Federico Luis	Mexico; Chile; United Kingdom; France
Gluey Feathers		Salka Tiziana	Germany
Hamalau gau		Oskar Alegria	Spain
The Loneliest Man in Town		Tizza Covi, Rainer Frimmel	Austria
Pedro in the Land	Pedro en el país	María Alché, Benjamín Naishtat	Argentina; Mexico; Norway
The Phantom	El fantasma	David Lamelas, Ignacio Masllorens	Argentina
Possible Love	가능한 사랑	Lee Chang-dong	South Korea
Red Rocks	Les Roches rouges	Bruno Dumont	Portugal; France; Italy; Spain; Qatar
Shot Reverse Shot	Plan contraplan	Radu Jude, Adrian Cioflâncă	Romania
Sometimes Sadness, Sometimes Rebellion	A veces me entra tristeza, otras veces rebelión	María Aparicio	Argentina; Spain
Teenage Sex and Death at Camp Miasma		Jane Schoenbrun	United States; Canada
Tristan Forever		Tobias Nölle, Loran Bonnardot	Switzerland
Whispers of a Burning Scent		Mo Harawe	Austria; Somalia; Germany
With Love and Rage		Bojina Panayotova	France
Someday a Child	Yawman Ma Walad	Marie-Rose Osta	France; Romania; Lebanon

=== Perlak ===
Highlighted title indicates City of Donostia / San Sebastián Audience Award winner.
Highlighted title indicates City of Donostia / San Sebastián Audience Award for Best European Film winner.

English title	Original title	Director(s)	Production country(ies)
All of a Sudden	Soudain	Ryusuke Hamaguchi	France; Japan; Germany; Belgium
La bola negra		Javier Calvo, Javier Ambrossi	Spain; France
Club Kid		Jordan Firstman	United States
Coward		Lukas Dhont	Belgium; France; Netherlands
Fatherland	Ojczyzna	Paweł Pawlikowski	Poland; Germany; Italy; France
Fjord		Cristian Mungiu	Romania; France; Norway; Sweden; Denmark
Hope	호프	Na Hong-jin	South Korea
The Invite		Olivia Wilde	United States
Iron Boy	Le Corset	Louis Clichy	France; Belgium
It Will Happen Tonight	Succederà questa notte	Nanni Moretti	Italy; France; Spain
Josephine		Beth de Araújo	United States
Just an Illusion	Juste une illusion	Eric Toledano, Olivier Nakache	France
The Man I Love		Ira Sachs	United States; France
Minotaur	Минотавр	Andrey Zvyagintsev	France; Germany; Latvia
NAZA		Yuval Abraham, Rachel Szor	United Kingdom
Tangles		Leah Nelson	Canada; United States
Wild Horse Nine		Martin McDonagh	United States; United Kingdom; Chile

=== Velodrome (Velódromo) ===
English title	Original title	Director(s)	Production country(ies)
Karateka		Aritz Moreno	Spain; Belgium
Muguruza FM 40 Tour		Ander Merino, Fermin Muguruza	Spain

=== Zinemira ===
English title	Original title	Director(s)	Production country(ies)
The Blind Ants	Inurri itsuak	Igor Legarreta	Spain; Belgium
Un tal Karlos		Arantxa Aguirre Carballeira	Spain
300 Oaks	300 haritz	Aitor Aranguren Ordoñez	Spain
Gatibu, Without Saying Goodbye	Gatibu, agur esan barik	Jabi Elortegi	Spain
Daughters of the Sea	Las hijas del mar	Gemma Gonzalez Martinez	Spain; South Korea
Septembers	Irailak	Izaskun Arandia Galarraga	Spain
Bringing Shadows to Light	Itzalak argitzen	Koldo Almandoz, Gorka Bilbao	Spain
Izarrak		David Taberna, Iñigo Puerta	Spain
My Father Alex	La maleta de Álex	Alejandro Cortés Calahorra	Spain
Pedro Arrupe. I Survived the Atomic Bomb	Pedro Arrupe. Yo viví la bomba atómica	Maite Ibáñez	Spain
Family Drill	Simulacro	Nitya López Saitua	Spain
Txakun txakür		Elsa Oliarj-Inès	France; Spain
Winnipeg, Seeds of Hope	Winnipeg, el barco de la esperanza	Beñat Beitia, Elio Quiroga	Spain; Chile; Argentina

=== Made in Spain ===
The 'Made in Spain' section includes the following titles:

English title	Original title	Director(s)	Production country(ies)
200 Lives, Paco Rabal	200 vidas, Paco Rabal	Vanesa Benítez	Spain; France; Mexico
El abrazo de los peces (15 años después)		Chema Rodríguez	Spain
Alive	Viva	Aina Clotet	Spain
Another League	Pioneras. Solo querían jugar	Marta Díaz de Lope Díaz	Spain; Portugal
Bad Beast	Mala bèstia	Bàrbara Farré	Spain
Balandrau, Where the Fierce Wind Blew	Balandrau, vent salvatge	Fernando Trullols	Spain
The Beloved	El ser querido	Rodrigo Sorogoyen	Spain; France
Better Class	Altas capacidades	Víctor García León	Spain; Uruguay
Bitter Christmas	Amarga Navidad	Pedro Almodóvar	Spain
La carn		Joan Porcel	Spain
The Good Daughter	La buena hija	Júlia de Paz	Spain; Belgium
The Guests	Die Gäste	Cristina Diz, Stefan Butzmühlen	Germany; Spain
Homeland of the Ice Cream Sellers	La patria de los heladeros	Maite Vitoria Daneris	Spain
I Won't Die for Love	Yo no moriré de amor	Marta Matute	Spain
Iván & Hadoum		Ian de la Rosa	Spain; Germany; Belgium
Kotodama, The Way of the Mirror	Kotodama, el camino del espejo	Eugenio Tardón, Carla Cañellas	Spain
Life Is Verdi	La vida és Verdi	Berta García Lacht	Spain
El otro Chiquito		Javier Morales Pérez, Juan Luis Zavala Aizpurua	Spain
Pizza Movies		Carlo Padial	Spain
The Righteous	Los justos	Jorge Alberto Lara, Fernando Pérez	Spain
Runner	Corredora	Laura García Alonso	Spain
Sixteen Moments of My Life	Seize moments de ma vie	Albert Serra	France; Spain
And So the Night Fell	Así chegou a noite	Ángel Santos Touza	Spain
This Body of Mine	Este cuerpo mío	Afioco Gnecco, Carolina Yuste	Spain
Three Goodbyes	Tre ciotole	Isabel Coixet	Italy; Spain

=== RTVE Galas ===
RTVE presentation galas were announced for the following films:

English title	Original title	Director(s)	Production countrie(s)
Arriba tutto		José Mota	Spain; Italy
Burundanga		José Corbacho	Spain
The Harvester (Note: A joint EiTB-RTVE gala otherwise also selected as an official selection special screening)	Sacamantecas	David Pérez Sañudo	Spain; Belgium
Lorca: Broken Voices	La voz quebrada	Manuel Menchón	Spain

=== Klasikoak ===
The 'Klasikoak' section, consisting of a retrospective slate of films written and/or directed by José Giovanni, includes the following films:

English title	Original title	Director(s)	Production countrie(s)
Among Wolves (1985)	Les Loups entre eux	José Giovanni	France
The Big Risk (1960)	Classe tous risques	Claude Sautet	France; Italy
Birds of Prey (1968)	Le Rapace	José Giovanni	France; Italy; Mexico
Les Égouts du paradis (1979)		José Giovanni	France
The Gypsy (1975)	Le Gitan	José Giovanni	France; Italy
Hit Man (1972)	La Scoumoune	José Giovanni	France; Italy
The Hole (1960)	Le Trou	Jacques Becker	France; Italy
Ho! Criminal Face (1968)	Ho!	Robert Enrico	France; Italy
Last Known Address (1970)	Dernier domicile connu	José Giovanni	France; Italy
A Man Named Rocca (1961)	Un nommé La Rocca	Jacques Becker	France; Italy
My Father Saved My Life (2001)	Mon père, il m'a sauvé la vie	José Giovanni	France
My Friend the Traitor (1988)	Mon ami le traître	José Giovanni	France
One Way Ticket (1971)	Un aller simple	José Giovanni	France; Italy; Spain
Une robe noire pour un tueur (1981)		José Giovanni	France
Second Wind (1966)	Le Deuxième Souffle	Jean-Pierre Melville	France
To Skin a Spy (1966)	Avec la peau des autres	Jacques Deray	France; Italy
The Sicilian Clan (1969)	Le clan des Siciliens	Henri Verneuil	France
Symphony for a Massacre (1963)	Symphonie pour un massacre	Jacques Deray	France; Italy
Two Men in Town (1973)	Deux hommes dans la ville	José Giovanni	France; Italy
Where Did Tom Go? (1971)	Où est passé Tom ?	José Giovanni	France; Italy

== Awards ==
Some of the awards bestowed in the festival include:

=== Official selection jury awards ===
- Golden Shell for Best Film: Tender Loving Care
- Special Jury Prize: Border
- Silver Shell for Best Director: Amanda Kernell (Brace Your Heart)
- Silver Shell for Best Leading Performance: Kate O'Flynn (Tender Loving Care) and Asta Kamma August (Growth of the Soil)
- Silver Shell for Best Supporting Performance: Javier Cámara (5 More Minutes)
- Jury Prize for Best Cinematography: Oskar Dahlsbakken (Growth of the Soil)
- Jury Prize for Best Screenplay: Mike Leigh (Tender Loving Care)

=== Other official awards ===
Naomi Watts received a Donostia Award

- Kutxabank-New Directors Award: Body of Glass
  - Special Mention: The World Before
- Horizontes Make & Mark Award: The Illusion of an Everlasting Summer
  - Special Mention: Flies
- Zabaltegi-Tabakalera Award: Teenage Sex and Death at Camp Miasma
  - Special Mention: Sometimes Sadness, Sometimes Rebellion
- City of Donostia / San Sebastián Audience Award: La bola negra
- City of Donostia / San Sebastián Audience Award for Best European Film: NAZA
- Donostia Award: Werner Herzog and Naomi Watts
- Irizar Basque Film Award: Txakun txakür
- SGAE Award for Best Original Music: Amine Bouhafa (Milo)
- RTVE Another Look Award: All of a Sudden

=== Non-official awards ===
- FIPRESCI Grand Prix: One Battle After Another (Paul Thomas Anderson)
- FIPRESCI Award: In My Father's Room
- Feroz Zinemaldia Award: The Debut
- SIGNIS Award: Tender Loving Care
  - Special Mention: On Behalf of My Son
- Sebastiane Award: Tangles
