= The Blind Ants =

- Basque: Inurri itsuak
- Directed by: Igor Legarreta
- Screenplay by: Andoni de Carlos; Igor Legarreta
- Based on: Las ciegas hormigas by Ramiro Pinilla
- Produced by: Gonzalo Salazar-Simpson; Luis Ferrón; Iker Ganuza; Ignacio Corrales; Roberto Butragueño; Helena Taberna
- Starring: Urko Olazabal; Itziar Ituño; Unax Hayden; Josean Bengoetxea; Miren Gaztañaga; Daniel Cabrera; Markel Cocó; Kimetz Etxabe; Anuk Puértolas; Elena Uriz; Patxi Bisquert; Carlos Santos
- Cinematography: Imanol Nabea
- Edited by: Maialen Sarasua Oliden
- Music by: Pascal Gaigne
- Production companies: Lamia Producciones; Lamia Films; Lazona ZInema; Lazona Producciones; Bruja del Norte Films AIE; Buendía Estudios Bizkaia; Sideral Cinema; Caviar Antwerp BV
- Distributed by: Buena Vista International
- Release dates: 18 September 2026 (Zinemaldia); 9 October 2026 (Spain)
- Countries: Spain; Belgium
- Languages: Basque; Spanish

The Blind Ants (Basque: Inurri itsuak) is a 2026 historical drama film directed by Igor Legarreta based on the novel Las ciegas hormigas by Ramiro Pinilla. It stars Urko Olazabal and Itziar Ituño alongside Josean Bengoetxea, Miren Gaztañaga, and Carlos Santos.

== Plot ==
In 1930, the inhabitants of Algorta try to rescue some coal from a British ship stranded on the shores of Biscay, to help them survive the winter.

== Cast ==
- Urko Olazabal as Sabas Jauregui
- Itziar Ituño as Josefa
- Carlos Santos as teniente García
- Unax Hayden
- Josean Bengoetxea
- Miren Gaztañaga
- Patxi Bisquert
- Daniel Cabrera
- Kimetz Etxabe
- Markel Cocó
- Anuk Puértolas
- Elena Uriz

== Production ==
The Blind Ants was produced by Lamia Producciones, Lamia Films, LaZona Zinema, LaZona Producciones, Bruja del norte AIE, Buendía Estudios Bizkaia, and Sideral Cinema alongside Caviar Antwerp B.V. with the participation of EiTB, Atresmedia, and HBO Max.

== Release ==
The film world premiered in the 'Zinemira' section of the 74th San Sebastián International Film Festival on 18 September 2026. Distributed by Buena Vista International, it was released theatrically in Spain on 9 October 2026.

== Reception ==
Javier Ocaña of El País lambasted the film as a "dull story without density in its themes and subtexts".

In a 3-star rating, Luis Martínez of El Mundo described the result as "a meticulous, harsh, bitter, coarse, sad, and very damp cinematic exercise".

Fran Chico of Fotogramas rated the film 4 out of 5 stars, citing the mise-en-scène and the performances as the best things about the film.

Oti Rodríguez Marchante of ABC gave the film 2 stars, concluding that while the film is "neither captivating nor fascinating" Legarreta "gives it a steady pace and a growing sense of interest".

Javier Yuste of El Cultural gave the film 3½ out of 5 stars, describing it as a "rural drama that is not afraid to play with elements of the Western genre".

== See also ==
- List of Spanish films of 2026
