= Arriba tutto =

- Theatrical release poster
- Directed by: José Mota
- Written by: José Mota; Fernando Erre; Marta González Vega; Claro García; Amalia Sánchez; Pilar Sánchez
- Produced by: Javier Ugarte; José Mota
- Starring: José Mota; Karra Elejalde; Pablo Cabello; Diego Anido; Olivia Molina
- Cinematography: Kiko de la Rica
- Edited by: Federica Forcesi
- Music by: Alicia Morote
- Production companies: La Terraza Films; Malas Calles Films; Producciones Nueva Línea; Ikiru Films; En un lugar de la magia AIE; Lupin Film
- Distributed by: A Contracorriente Films
- Release dates: 23 September 2026 (Zinemaldia); 23 October 2026 (Spain)
- Running time: 102 minutes
- Countries: Spain; Italy
- Languages: Spanish; Italian; German

Arriba tutto is a 2026 comedy-drama film directed by José Mota (in his directorial debut feature). It stars Mota alongside Karra Elejalde, Pablo Cabello, Diego Anido, and Olivia Molina.

The film premiered at the 74th San Sebastián International Film Festival on 23 September 2026 ahead of its theatrical release in Spain under A Contracorriente Films on 23 October 2026.

== Plot ==
In 1905, a boy (Michi) learns from his father, a strolling comedian, about finding comedy and magic in everyday life. In 1939, the boy has become an embittered man (Miguel). After coming across childhood flame Conchita and in the face of adversity, he is forced to re-learn past lessons.

== Cast ==
- Pablo Cabello as Michi
- José Mota
- Karra Elejalde
- Diego Anido
- Olivia Molina
- Mila Borràs
- Luciano Scarpa
- Eugenio Barona

== Production ==
The film is a Spanish-Italian co-production by La Terraza Films, Nueva Línea Producciones, Malas Calles Films, En un lugar de la Magia AIE, and Lupin Film with the association of CMM TV and 100 Acres, the participation of RTVE, and the collaboration of Amazon Prime Video. It was shot in locations across Gran Canaria, the Madrid region, and Castilla–La Mancha, including the Cortijo de Calderetas in Valleseco and the Monastery of Uclés. Kiko de la Rica worked as cinematographer. Alicia Morote scored the film.

== Release ==
The film was presented at the Teatro Victoria Eugenia in a RTVE gala of the 74th San Sebastián International Film Festival on 23 September 2026. Distributed by A Contracorriente Films, it was scheduled to be released theatrically in Spain on 9 October 2026. The release date was later set for 23 October 2026.

== Reception ==
Javier Ocaña of Cinemanía rated the film 3 out of 5 stars, was surprised with its "remarkable technical and stylistic quality, with beautiful cinematography by Kiko de la Rica", and deemed the film to be an "unusual breath of fresh air", although it does not always manage to strike the right balance when it comes to sentimentality.

== See also ==
- List of Spanish films of 2026
