= Ghost Song (film) =

2026 German fantasy drama film

- Theatrical release poster
- German: Geister
- Directed by: Fatih Akin
- Screenplay by: Fatih Akin; Ruth Toma
- Produced by: Ann-Kristin Bardi; Ann-Kristin Homann
- Starring: Mariam Dawoud; Eren M. Güvercin; Carlotta von Falkenhayn; Gabriel-Winner Amorim
- Cinematography: Frank Griebe
- Edited by: Andrew Bird
- Music by: Malakoff Kowalski
- Production companies: Bombero International; Warner Bros. Film Productions Germany; Rialto Film
- Distributed by: Warner Bros. Pictures
- Release dates: 18 September 2026 (Zinemaldia); 5 November 2026 (Germany)
- Running time: 106 minutes
- Country: Germany
- Language: German

Ghost Song (German: Geister) is a 2026 German fantasy drama film co-written and directed by Fatih Akin. Starring Mariam Dawoud and Eren M. Güvercin as Farasha and Faris, the film follows two strangers who meet at a graduation party and fall in love at first sight. But their connection is shattered when Farasha dies later that night.

The film had its world premiere as opening film in competition at the 74th San Sebastián International Film Festival on 18 September 2026, where it competed for Golden Shell. It was theatrically released in Germany on 5 November by Warner Bros. Pictures.

== Summary ==
Farasha and Faris, who meet at a graduation party when they are 20 and instantly fall in love. That same night, Farasha dies, but she finds a way to stay connected to Faris by entering his dreams. For 40 nights, she visits him there, allowing their love to grow across two worlds until their final meeting.

== Cast ==
- Mariam Dawoud as Farasha
- Eren M. Güvercin as Faris
- Carlotta von Falkenhayn
- Gabriel-Winner Amorim
- Lama Alhalabi
- David Schütter
- Anna Bederke

== Production ==
The project was first announced by Fatih Akin at Cannes Film Festival in May 2025 after premiere of his 2025 film Amrum.

Principal photography began on 31 July 2025 and ended on 6 October 2025, shot in Hamburg, Schleswig-Holstein and Bavaria.

== Release ==
Ghost Song had its world premiere at the 74th San Sebastián International Film Festival on 18 September 2026, vying for the Golden Shell. It will also be showcased in Große Freiheit section of Filmfest Hamburg on 1 October 2026.

It will be presented in the Grand public section of the 21st Rome Film Festival in October 2026.

The film was released in Germany on 5 November 2026 by Warner Bros. Pictures.

== Reception ==
Jonatham Romney of ScreenDaily deemed the film to be "emotionally satisfying" otherwise commending how "radiant newcomer Mariam Dawoud gives her heroine both emotional and cultural complexity".

== Accolades ==
Award	Date of ceremony	Category	Recipient(s)	Result	Ref.
San Sebastián International Film Festival	26 September 2026	Golden Shell for Best Film	Ghost Song	Nominated	
