= The Bad Son (film) =

2026 Spanish drama film

- Theatrical release poster
- Spanish: El mal hijo
- Directed by: Jaime Lorente
- Screenplay by: Jaime Lorente; Salvador S. Molina
- Based on: El mal hijo by Salvador S. Molina
- Produced by: Carmen Aguado
- Starring: Miguel Ángel Puro; Susi Sánchez; Hugo Arbués; Óscar de la Fuente; Abel de la Fuente
- Cinematography: Elias M. Felix
- Edited by: Regino Hernández
- Music by: Luismi Glez Bedmar
- Production companies: AF Films; Emedia Canary Projects; AF Canary Islands Studios; Match Point; Crea SGR
- Distributed by: AF Pictures
- Release dates: 18 September 2026 (SSIFF); 23 October 2026 (Spain)
- Running time: 106 minutes
- Country: Spain
- Language: Spanish

The Bad Son (Spanish: El mal hijo) is a 2026 Spanish drama film co-written and directed by Jaime Lorente in his debut feature starring Susi Sánchez. Based on novel El mal hijo by Salvador S. Molina the film follows a grandmother and her eleven-year-old grandson, Rubén.

It premiered at the 74th San Sebastián International Film Festival on 18 September 2026 as the opening film of the 'New Directors' section. Subsequently it will be released on 23 October in the Spanish theatres.

== Synopsis ==
Rubén is eleven years old, and when his father suddenly disappears, he has to move in with his grandmother, a woman he hardly knows. In her quiet, old-fashioned countryside home, Rubén slowly learns how pain in a family can be passed down through the years. As he grows, he tries to understand these wounds and try to find a way to heal those wounds as he grows.

== Cast ==
- Miguel Ángel Puro as father
- Susi Sánchez as grandmother
- Hugo Arbués as Uncle Juanji
- Óscar de la Fuente
- Abel de la Fuente as Rubén
- Christian Checa as adult Rubén

== Production ==
On 21 November 2025, it was reported that filming for the film has begun. The part of the film was shot at Gran Canaria.

=== Music ===
The film's original song, "Let Me Sit You," was composed by Niño de Elche.

== Release ==
The Bad Son was presented in the 'New Directors' section of the 74th San Sebastián International Film Festival on 18 September 2026. It is scheduled to be released theatrically in Spain on 23 October 2026 by AF Pictures.

== Accolades ==
Award	Date of ceremony	Category	Recipient(s)	Result	Ref.
San Sebastián International Film Festival	26 September 2026	Kutxabank-New Directors Award	The Bad Son	Nominated	

== See also ==
- List of Spanish films of 2026
