= The Last Goodbye (film) =

- Basque: Azken agurra
- Directed by: Koldo Almandoz
- Written by: Koldo Almandoz
- Produced by: Marian Fernández Pascal
- Starring: Iñigo Azpitarte; Izaro Nieto
- Cinematography: Javier Agirre Erauso
- Edited by: Laurent Dufreche
- Music by: Aitor Etxebarria
- Production companies: Garabi Films; Txintxua Films; Frakasa Films AIE
- Release date: 23 September 2026 (Zinemaldia)
- Country: Spain
- Language: Basque

The Last Goodbye (Basque: Azken agurra) is an upcoming Spanish existentialist dramedy film written and directed by Koldo Almandoz. It stars Iñigo Azpitarte and Izaro Nieto.

== Plot ==
The plot follows 45-year-old antihero Tomás, who runs a funeral home and falls for younger Sara, an anthropology student doing an internship at his company.

== Cast ==
- Iñigo Azpitarte as Tomás Martínez
- Izaro Nieto as Sara
- Iñaki Beraetxe
- Iraia Elias
- Josean Bengoetxea
- Laia Escribano
- Sara Cozar
- Miguel Garcés
- Jose Ramon Soroiz

== Production ==
The Last Goodbye was produced by Garabi Films alongside Txintxua Films and Frakasa Films AIE with support from the Basque Government and the participation of EiTB. Shooting locations in the Basque Country included San Sebastián, Irun, Orio, Errenteria, and Pasaia. Javi Agirre worked as cinematographer. Filming wrapped on 28 November 2025.

== Release ==
The film will be presented at the 74th San Sebastián International Film Festival in September 2026. It was also programmed in the international competition of the 42nd Warsaw International Film Festival.

== See also ==
- List of Spanish films of 2027
