= The World Before (film) =

2026 South Korean romantic drama film

- First look poster
- Hangul: 첫세계
- RR: Cheotsegye
- MR: Ch'ŏssegye
- Directed by: Yoon Dan-bi
- Screenplay by: Yoon Dan-bi
- Produced by: Yoon Dan-bi
- Starring: Sim Su-bin; Kim Eo-jin
- Cinematography: Lee Seong-eun
- Edited by: Won Chang-jae
- Music by: Lee Min-hwi
- Production company: Humanite Co. Ltd
- Distributed by: At Nine Film
- Release date: September 16, 2026 (TIFF)
- Running time: 115 minutes
- Country: South Korea
- Language: Korean

The World Before (Korean: 첫세계) is a 2026 South Korean romantic drama film directed and written by Yoon Dan-bi. The film follows Jin, a 17-year-old girl living on an island, and the events that unfold after she meets a boy named Du-jae.

The film had its world premiere in the Platform section of the 2026 Toronto International Film Festival on September 16, 2026, where it will compete for the Platform Prize. Subsequently it competed for Kutxabank-New Directors Award in New Directors section at 74th San Sebastián International Film Festival on September 24, and got a Special Mention.

== Synopsis ==
Jin is Seventeen-year-old and has lived her whole life on a small island cut off from the mainland. When Dujae comes back for his grandmother's funeral and stays alone in her empty house, Jin starts finding little reasons to visit him. Slowly, seeing him becomes part of her routine. As summer goes on, the island she thought she knew begins to feel different; the roads, the ocean, even the people seem changed. Jin starts seeing her home, and herself, with new eyes. But summer, like everything else on the island, eventually fades.

== Cast ==
- Sim Su-bin as Jin
- Kim Eo-jin as Du-jae

== Release ==
The World Before had its world premiere at the 2026 Toronto International Film Festival on September 16, 2026, in the Platform section.

The film was also selected in the New Directors section of the 74th San Sebastián International Film Festival for screening on September 24, 2026.

It was also presented in the Korean Cinema Today - Panorama section at the 31st Busan International Film Festival on October 7, 2026.

It is expected to be released in South Korean theaters in 2027 by AtNine Film.

Germany based world sales company m-appeal acquired the international sales rights of the film in August 2026.

== Accolades ==
Award	Date of ceremony	Category	Recipient(s)	Result	Ref.
Toronto International Film Festival	20 September 2026	Platform Prize	The World Before	Nominated	
San Sebastián International Film Festival	26 September 2026	Kutxabank–New Directors Award	The World Before	Special Mention	
Asia Pacific Screen Awards	30 October 2026	Best New Performer	Sim Su-bin	Won	
