= Five More Minutes =

Five More Minutes may refer to:

- Five More Minutes (Scotty McCreery song)
- Five More Minutes (Jonas Brothers song)
- Five More Minutes (film)
