= The Harvester (2026 film) =

- Theatrical release poster
- Spanish: Sacamantecas
- Directed by: David Pérez Sañudo
- Screenplay by: David Pérez Sañudo; Sergio Granda
- Story by: Asier Gerrikaetxebarria; Joanes Urkixo
- Produced by: Olmo Figueredo González-Quevedo; David Pérez Sañudo
- Starring: Antonio de la Torre; Patricia López Arnaiz; Josean Bengoetxea; Eneko Sagardoy; Haizea Carneros; Luis Callejo
- Cinematography: Kenneth Oribe
- Edited by: José M. G. Moyano; Lluís Murua
- Music by: Beatriz López-Nogales
- Production companies: La Claqueta PC; Amania Films; Caviar-Beluga
- Distributed by: Buena Vista International
- Release dates: 21 September 2026 (Zinemaldia); 6 November 2026 (Spain)
- Countries: Spain; Belgium
- Languages: Basque; Spanish

The Harvester (Spanish: Sacamantecas) is a 2026 historical drama film directed by David Pérez Sañudo. Shot primarily in Basque, it stars Antonio de la Torre as the serial killer Juan Díaz de Garayo alongside Patricia López Arnaiz and Josean Bengoetxea.

== Plot ==
The plot is set against the backdrop of the Third Carlist War in Álava in the 1870s. Following the discovery of several dead female bodies near Vitoria, the sister of one of the murdered women seeks justice while law enforcement officer Pío Pinedo deals with resource scarcity.

== Cast ==
- Antonio de la Torre as Juan Díaz de Garayo, "Sacamantecas"
- Patricia López Arnaiz as Ángela
- Josean Bengoetxea
- Eneko Sagardoy
- Luis Callejo
- Urko Olazabal
- Haizea Carneros
- Isabel Gaudí
- Fernando Albizu
- Joan Bailador

== Production ==
The Harvester is a La Claqueta PC and Amania Films co-production with Caviar-Beluga with participation of EiTB, RTVE, and Prime Video, and backing from ICAA, the Basque Government, Ayuntamiento de Vitoria-Gasteiz, and Diputación Foral de Álava. Shot primarily in Basque, The Harvester began filming in Vitoria-Gasteiz in October 2024. Kenneth Oribe worked as cinematographer. Shooting locations included the Cathedral of Santa María de Vitoria.

== Release ==
The film was presented at a joint EiTB-RTVE gala as a part of the 74th San Sebastián International Film Festival on 21 September 2026. It was released theatrically in Spain on 6 November 2026 by Buena Vista International. Latido Films secured international sales.

== See also ==
- List of Spanish films of 2026
