= Reversion (2025 film) =

- Theatrical release poster
- Spanish: Reversión
- Directed by: Jacob Santana
- Screenplay by: Frank Ariza; Marco Lagarde; Jacob Santana
- Based on: Forgotten by Jang Hang-jun
- Produced by: Frank Ariza; Manu Vega; Carmen Aguado; Desiree Reyes Peña
- Starring: Jaime Lorente; Manu Vega; Belén Rueda; Fernando Cayo
- Cinematography: David Azcano
- Edited by: Iván de Paz
- Music by: Víctor Reyes
- Production companies: Forgotten 1 Entertainment; ARDE Producciones
- Distributed by: AF Pictures
- Release date: 7 November 2025 (Spain)
- Running time: 97 minutes
- Countries: Spain; Dominican Republic
- Language: Spanish

Reversion (Spanish: Reversión) is a 2025 psychological thriller film directed by Jacob Santana based on the South Korean film Forgotten. Co-produced by companies from Spain and the Dominican Republic, it stars Jaime Lorente alongside Manu Vega, Belén Rueda, and Fernando Cayo.

== Plot ==
After moving to a new residence with his parents and his much admired older brother David, psychologically unstable Mario begins to harbour doubts about his own sanity and the world around him.

== Cast ==
- Jaime Lorente as Mario
- Manu Vega as David
- Belén Rueda
- Fernando Cayo

== Production ==
The film is a Spanish-Dominican co-production by Forgotten 1 Entertainment and ARDE Producciones, with the involvement of AF films, Ebribari Audiovisual and E-Media Canary Project. It was shot in Madrid, the Canary Islands (Gran Canaria), and the Dominican Republic.

== Release ==
Film Factory Entertainment acquired international distribution rights to the film ahead of the 2025 European Film Market in Berlin. Distributed by AF Pictures, Reversion was released theatrically in Spain on 7 November 2025. Debuting in 169 screens, the film grossed €141,257 (21,000 admissions) in its opening weekend.

== Reception ==
Manuel J. Lombardo of Diario de Sevilla gave the film a 2-star rating, deeming the result to be a "B movie product" with certain vocation for export.

Sergio F. Pinilla of Cinemanía rated the film 3 out of 5 stars, assessing that even if the plot tricks used by the film are not exactly novel, Reversion is "entertaining and even keeps you on the edge of your seat".

Raquel Hernández Luján of HobbyConsolas gave the film 68 points, declaring that it "stimulates, entertains, and arouses the viewer's curiosity".

== See also ==
- List of Spanish films of 2025
