= What Remains (2026 film) =

- Turkish: Artakalan
- Directed by: Yeşim Ustaoğlu
- Screenplay by: Yeşim Ustaoğlu
- Produced by: Yeşim Ustaoğlu; Anna Maria Aslanoglu; Behrooz Hashemian
- Starring: Öykü Karayel; Metin Akdülger; Ali Kayra Kul; İlyas Salman
- Cinematography: Kiril Prodanov
- Edited by: Mathilde Muyard
- Music by: Sevket Akinci
- Production companies: Ustaoglu Film; Cité Films; Tarantula; RFF International
- Distributed by: Mubi (Turkey)
- Release dates: 22 September 2026 (Zinemaldia); 20 November 2026 (Turkey)
- Running time: 126 minutes
- Countries: Turkey; France; Luxembourg; Bulgaria
- Language: Turkish

What Remains (Turkish: Artakalan) is a 2026 drama film written and directed by Yeşim Ustaoğlu. A co-production of Turkey, France, Luxembourg, and Bulgaria, it stars Öykü Karayel, Metin Akdülger, Ali Kayra Kul, and İlyas Salman.

The film had its world premiere in the main competition of the 74th San Sebastián International Film Festival on 22 September 2026, where it competed for the Golden Shell. It will be theatrically released in Turkey by Mubi on 20 November.

== Plot ==
Elif, a poet in a rough patch both from a creative and a personal standpoint, decides to make a trip.

== Cast ==
- Öykü Karayel as Elif
- Metin Akdülger as Mehmet
- Ali Kayra Kul as Selim
- İlyas Salman as Mustafa
- Aysegül Cengiz as Sadiye
- Merve Engin as Banu
- Feride Karaman as Feride
- Kezzban Küçük as Naile
- İla Kayra Kul as Selim'in Arkadaşı

== Production ==
The film is a Turkish-French-Luxembourgian-Bulgarian co-production by Ustaoglu Film, Cité Films, Tarantula, and RFF International, alongside Mubi, Pak Ventures and Yuvision.

== Release ==
The film premiered in the main competition of the 74th San Sebastián International Film Festival on 22 September 2026. For its North American premiere, it was also programmed at the 2026 Vancouver International Film Festival.

It will be theatrically released in Turkey by Mubi on 20 November 2026.

== Reception ==
Fabien Lemercier of Cineuropa declared What Remains a "staggeringly beautiful film", commending its "masterfully crafted, gravitas-imbued dual perspective".

Jordan Mintzer of The Hollywood Reporter described the film as "a quiet drama with deep feelings".

Reviewing for the Alliance of Women Film Journalists, Jennifer Green pointed out that the film "asks for patience and time to allow its themes, ideas and symbolism sink in".

Matthew Joseph Jenner of International Cinephile Society rated What Remains 3 out of 5 stars, singling out Karayel's acting as the element ultimately binding the film together and making it "so incredibly poignant and meaningful".
