= Hamburg (film) =

- Theatrical release poster
- Spanish: Hamburgo
- Directed by: Lino Escalera
- Written by: Daniel Remón; Roberto Martín Maiztegui; Lino Escalera
- Produced by: Antonio Asensio; Paloma Molina; José Nolla; Cristina Zumárraga; Pablo E. Bossi; José Alba
- Starring: Jaime Lorente; Roger Casamajor; Ioana Bugarin; Antonio Buil; Asia Ortega; Mona Martínez
- Cinematography: Juana Jiménez
- Edited by: Miguel Doblado
- Music by: Marius Leftãrache
- Production companies: Zeta Cinema; Iconica Producciones; Tandem Films; Hamburgo la película AIE; Pecado Films; Lolita Producciones; Cinelabs
- Distributed by: Filmax
- Release dates: 21 March 2025 (Málaga); 30 May 2025 (Spain)
- Countries: Spain; Romania
- Language: Spanish

Hamburg (Spanish: Hamburgo) is a 2025 thriller drama film directed by Lino Escalera. A Spanish-Romanian co-production, it stars Jaime Lorente alongside Ioana Bugarin and Roger Casamajor. It premiered at the 28th Málaga Film Festival on 21 March 2025 ahead of its 30 May 2025 theatrical release in Spain by Filmax.

== Plot ==
Set on the Costa del Sol, the plot follows a driver, Germán, who wants to leave behind the criminal environment pertaining the prostitution business.

== Cast ==
- Jaime Lorente as Germán
- Roger Casamajor as Cacho
- Ioana Bugarin as Alina
- Tamara Casellas
- Asia Ortega
- Manolo Caro
- Mona Martínez
- Antonio Buil

== Production ==
The film is a Spanish-Romanian co-production by Zeta Cinema, Icónica Producciones, Tandem Films alongside Pecado Films and Cinelabs, with the participation of Netflix and Canal Sur. Shooting locations included Torremolinos, Rincón, and Málaga.

== Release ==
Hamburg premiered at the 28th Málaga Film Festival in March 2025. It is scheduled to be released theatrically in Spain on 30 May 2025 by Filmax

== Reception ==
Javier Ocaña of El País considered that while the "film invents nothing from an artistic standpoint", its vision "is as bitter socially as it is stimulating cinematically".

Carmen L. Lobo of La Razón rated the film 3 out of 5 stars, singling out "its cast, led by a very remarkable and solid Lorente and Casamajor" as the best thing about the film.

== See also ==
- List of Spanish films of 2025
