= José Luis Rebordinos =

Spanish festival programmer

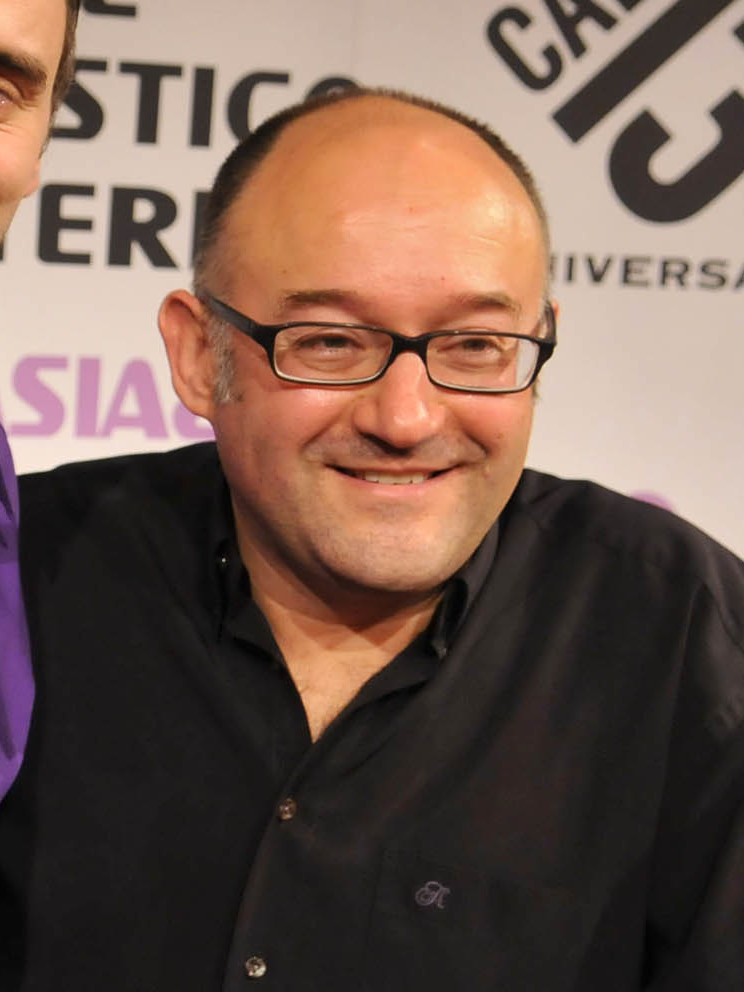
- Born: José Luis Rebordinos Miramón; 22 September 1961 (age 64); Errenteria, Gipuzkoa, Spain
- Occupation: Festival director

José Luis Rebordinos Miramón (born 22 September 1961) is a Spanish festival programmer. He has been the director of the San Sebastián International Film Festival since 2011.

== Biography ==
José Luis Rebordinos Miramón was born on 22 September 1961 in Errenteria. He earned a degree in Special Pedagogy. He directed the first edition of the San Sebastián Horror and Fantasy Film Festival in 1989. As responsible for the cinema department of Donostia Kultura, he also directed the San Sebastián Film and Human Rights Festival. In 2011, he replaced Mikel Olaciregui as director of the San Sebastián International Film Festival (Donostia Zinemaldia). His overarching strategy at the helm of the festival has been guided by the idea of reconciling the audience with the need to make commercial-driven decisions in order for a festival to reach a certain level of media clout.

In 2015, he was bestowed the Gold Medal of Merit in the Fine Arts, and in 2021 with Knight rank of the French Ordre des Arts et des Lettres.

He is a member of the European Film Academy. He is set to retire after the 74th San Sebastián International Film Festival.
