= Le Faux Soir =

- Part of the film crew led by Michaël R. Roskam, at the 2026 Film Fest Gent
- Directed by: Michaël R. Roskam
- Written by: Bernard Falaise; Domenico La Porta; Michaël R. Roskam
- Produced by: Frakas Productions; Groupe Rossel; Rectangle Productions; Goodfellas; Harbor Men Pictures
- Starring: Arieh Worthalter; François Damiens; Bouli Lanners; Mélanie Thierry; Mara Taquin
- Cinematography: Jordan Vanschel
- Edited by: Nelly Quettier
- Music by: Chassol
- Production companies: Frakas Productions; Rectangle Productions
- Release date: September 11, 2026 (TIFF)
- Running time: 133 minutes
- Countries: Belgium; France
- Language: French

Le Faux Soir is an upcoming Belgian historical drama film directed by Michael R. Roskam.The film is an adaptation of Marie Istas's book Le "Faux" Soir : 9 novembre 1943 (The False Evening: November 9, 1943) and depicts the activities of the Belgian resistance during World War II.

== Premise ==
In November 1943, Belgian Resistance fighters launched a groundbreaking psychological warfare operation by publishing Faux Soir. They distributed a satirical replica of Le Soir, Belgium's leading daily newspaper, which had been seized as a tool of German propaganda.

This audacious stunt widely recognized as history's first media hack aimed to humiliate the German occupiers and ignite public defiance. The parody newspaper electrified occupied Europe, providing a massive boost to civilian morale. Its success echoed all the way to London, prompting Prime Minister of the United Kingdom Winston Churchill to personally congratulate journalist and resistance leader Marc Aubrion for masterminding the operation.

== Cast ==
- Arieh Worthalter as Marc 'Yvon' Aubrion
- François Damiens
- Bouli Lanners
- Mélanie Thierry
- Karim Leklou
- Peter Van Den Begin
- Alexis Manenti
- Laurent Capelluto
- Yolande Moreau
- Viviane de Muynck

== Production ==
=== Casting ===
To make the film a reality, the production has recruited over 1,000 extras, including a significant number of young people.

=== Filming ===
The film was shot in Brussels, Ghent and Mons.

== Release ==
The film will have its world premiere at the 51st Toronto International Film Festival in the Special Presentations section on 11 September 2026.

It will have its European premiere at the 74th San Sebastián International Film Festival on 26 September 2026 as closing film.

The film will be released in Belgium on 2 December 2026. .
