= Forgotten (2017 film) =

2017 film by Jang Hang-jun

- Theatrical release poster
- Hangul: 기억의 밤
- RR: Gieogui bam
- MR: Kiŏgŭi pam
- Directed by: Jang Hang-jun
- Written by: Jang Hang-jun
- Produced by: Park Joon-sik
- Starring: Kang Ha-neul; Kim Mu-yeol
- Cinematography: Kim Il-yeon
- Edited by: Heo Seon-mi
- Music by: Kim Tae-hoon
- Production companies: B.A. Entertainment; Baram Pictures
- Distributed by: Kiwi Company; Megabox Plus M
- Release date: November 29, 2017 (South Korea)
- Running time: 109 minutes
- Country: South Korea
- Language: Korean
- Box office: US$10 million

Forgotten (Korean: 기억의 밤; RR: Gieogui bam; lit. 'Night of Memory') is a 2017 South Korean mystery thriller film written and directed by Jang Hang-jun. The film stars Kang Ha-neul and Kim Mu-yeol. It was released in South Korea on November 29, 2017.

== Plot ==
Jin-seok (Kang Ha-neul) moves into a new home with his mother, his father, and his older brother Yoo-seok (Kim Moo-yeol). His father informs him that one room contains the belongings of the previous owner; the brothers are told not to enter the room. That night, when Yoo-seok takes Jin-seok outside in the rain to get some fresh air, he witnesses Yoo-seok being kidnapped and dragged into a car. After 19 days, Yoo-seok finally returns home, but with no memory of his time away from home.

Jin-seok starts to notice discrepancies in his brother's personality and suspects that he is not his real brother; Yoo-seok claims this is merely a result of him not taking his daily barbital medication. After catching on to signs of artifice in the behaviours of his parents, he flees the house. He explains the situation to officers at a police station, but they do not believe him, assuming he is not sane. Though Jin-seok believes the year is 1997 and he is 21 years old, the officers reveal the year is 2017: Jin-seok is 41 years old. He confirms this by observing around him a modern smartphone, a tablet, and an LED TV showing the current president of South Korea (Moon Jae-in) meeting with U.S president Donald Trump. He returns home and enters the room he was told not to enter; inside is a depiction of a murder crime scene. His family arrives and Yoo-seok reveals the truth.

20 years ago, a teenage girl and her mother were murdered in the room they stand in. Though the case went cold, the family of the victims persist to find the killer, recruiting Yoo-seok in the process. They track down and abduct Jin-seok, who they determined was the killer, torturing him for a confession; however, he claims he has no recollection of the murder.

A psychiatrist is hired and suggests that Jin-seok has repressed his memories due to dissociative amnesia. He hypnotizes him back to before the traumatic event in 1997, figuring that if they can reenact the events of the murder, Jin-seok may be able to recover his memories. The psychiatrist will pose as the father; meanwhile Yoo-seok recruits an actress for the mother, who refers to Yoo-seok by his real name, Mr Choi. The restricted room is used for a reenactment of the murder scene, and the plan would conclude that night during the rain. However, Choi is unexpectedly arrested by police for assault and fraud. Upon returning, the three are forced to keep up the act while they wait for the next rainy night to properly reenact the night of the murder.

Back in the present, Jin-seok maintains his innocence. He escapes Choi, who pursues him in a van. After Choi crashes the van and sustains an injury to the head, Jin-seok is hit by a stranger's car. When Jin-seok wakes up, hospitalised, he regains his memories from 1997.

In 1997, Jin-seok is at a river while his real parents and older brother Yoo-seok wait in a car. They later get into a car accident that kills his parents and mortally injures his brother. Jin-seok has difficulty getting the funding for Yoo-seok's surgery due to the 1997 Asian financial crisis. Following numerous failures to find a job online, he is messaged by an anonymous person offering him money to kill a mother, but he must leave her two children unharmed. Spurred on by urgent requests from Yoo-seok's doctor, he accepts.

When he arrives at the house, his conscience does not allow him to go through with the murder. He is about to leave when the mother awakes, mistaking him for her husband. When he turns around, the knife causes her to scream, but he is able to get her to stop screaming by slowly walking away. The issue arises when the mother's screams awaken the daughter, who sees the knife in Jin-seok's hand and runs back to her room while screaming. He chases the daughter, trying to get her to stop screaming as well. He gets his hand in between a door she is trying to push shut and overpowers her, but accidentally stabs her while trying to open the door. The girl's mother comes up and sees a pool of blood on the floor and starts screaming, which causes him to go through with the intended murder in order to stop the mother screaming. On his way out, a little boy emerges and Jin-seok tells him to go back to sleep. As he leaves, he discovers that the family's father is his brother's doctor.

Jin-seok meets with the doctor demanding to know why he would have his own family killed. In light of the financial crisis, the doctor had taken out multiple insurance policies on his wife: the murder would prevent his children from becoming homeless. The doctor tries to kill Jin-seok for killing his daughter; a struggle ensues, and the doctor accidentally falls to his death.

In the present, Choi, having survived the crash, is about to poison Jin-seok, but Jin-seok informs him that his memory has returned. Choi reveals to him that he is the doctor's son whom Jin-seok spared 20 years ago. After the deaths of his family, his relatives took all the money and left him to grow up in an orphanage. He begs Jin-seok to tell him why he did not kill him too and whether the murders were planned by his father. A distraught Jin-seok lies by taking full responsibility, but Choi does not trust him.

Jin-seok, now aware that he had in fact committed the murders, poisons himself and dies. Simultaneously, Choi comes to terms with the murder of his family and dies by suicide by jumping out of the hospital window.

Back in 1997, when Jin-seok is standing at the river, he is stopped by a little boy who offers him a lollipop. After declining, the boy runs to his family, who are shown to be the doctor and his family. They all walk away happily and Jin-seok smiles at them peacefully.

== Cast ==
- Kang Ha-neul as Jin-seok
- Kim Mu-yeol as Yoo-seok
- Moon Sung-keun as The Father
- Na Young-hee as The Mother
- Choi Go as Choi Seung-uk
- Kim Hyun-mok as a student at police station
- Yoo In-soo as High school student
- Lee Dong-jin
- Lee Sung-woo
- Yeon Je-hyung
- Nam Myeong-ryeol as Professor Choi

== Production ==
Principal photography began on March 11, 2017 and ended on June 8, 2017. For the film's premise, Jang Hang-jun took inspiration from a story told to him by a friend, who recalled how his cousin left home for about a month and seemed like a radically different person when he returned. Jang also drew inspiration from French folktale Bluebeard.

== Release ==
The film was released in South Korea on November 29, 2017.

After the local release, Forgotten was released on Netflix. It is available in 190 countries.

== Remake ==
The Spanish-Dominican Republic remake Reversion was released in 2025.
