= Tied Up (film) =

- Theatrical release poster
- Spanish: La silla
- Directed by: Ángel de la Cruz
- Screenplay by: Ángel de la Cruz
- Based on: La silla by David Jasso
- Starring: Jaime Lorente
- Cinematography: Christos Voudouris
- Edited by: Iván de Paz
- Production company: La Silla La Película
- Distributed by: AF Pictures
- Release date: 29 May 2026
- Running time: 76 minutes
- Country: Spain
- Language: Spanish

Tied Up (Spanish: La silla, lit. 'the chair') is a 2026 Spanish psychological thriller film written and directed by Ángel de la Cruz based on the novel by David Jasso. It stars Jaime Lorente.

== Plot ==
Seeking to put himself in the shoes of the characters in his new novel, horror fiction writer Daniel Lonces asks his wife Irene to tie him up to a chair, but everything that can go wrong does go wrong and all hell breaks loose as, following a domestic accident, Irene never manages to untie him.

== Cast ==
- Jaime Lorente as Daniel Lonces
- Christina Ochoa as Irene
- Estíbaliz Veiga
- Eva Rufo

== Production ==
The film is the screen adaptation of the novel La silla by David Jasso. It was produced by La Silla La Película with the association of Ézaro Films and Emedia Canary Projects and the participation of AF Films, AF Canary Islands Studios, Match Point, and Crea SGR.

== Release ==
Distributed by AF Pictures, La silla was released theatrically in Spain on 29 May 2026. Film Factory handled international sales, including the film in the company's portfolio for the 2026 European Film Market.

== Reception ==
Philipp Engel of La Vanguardia gave the film 1 out of 5 stars, assessing that it fails as a Buried-style minimalist thriller due to "its lack of plausibility", "its moral and plot confusion", "the basic nature of its tricks", and its "generic aesthetics".

Enid Román Almansa of Cinemanía rated the film 3 out 5 stars, assessing that it "stressful and painful to watch", and that despite its abrupt ending, "it manages to captivate and entertain".

Carmen L. Lobo of La Razón gave the film 3 stars, singling out Lorente's "utterly committed and deeply nerve-racking performance" as the best thing about the film.

Borja Ruete of MeriStation rated the film 3½ out of 5 stars, concluding that "although some of the decisions seem implausible, the film remains true to its vision and conveys a sense of constant unease".

== See also ==
- List of Spanish films of 2026
