= Jaime Lorente =

Spanish actor

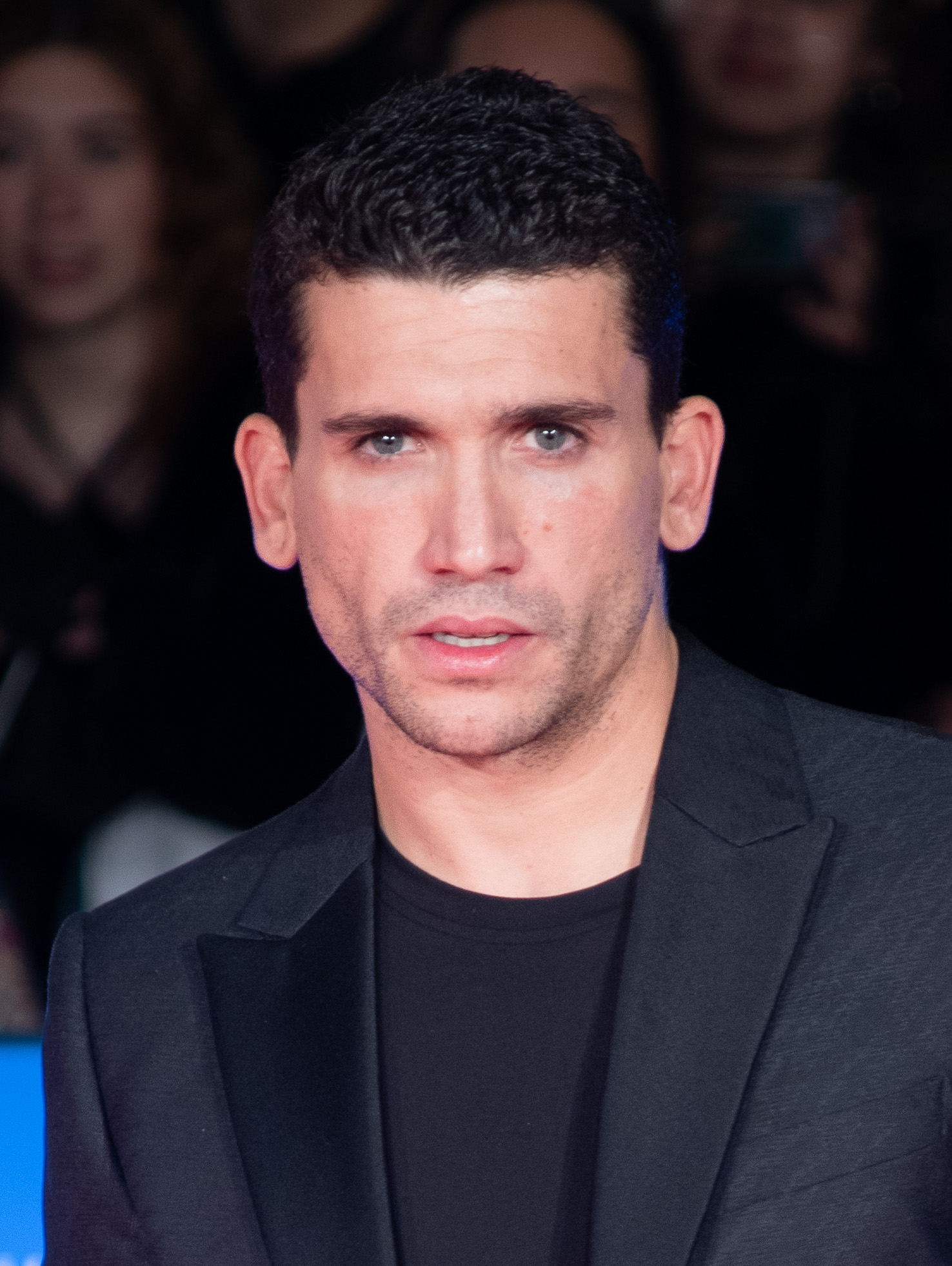
- Lorente in 2024
- Born: Jaime Lorente López; 12 December 1991 (age 34); Murcia, Spain
- Education: ESAD de Murcia
- Occupation: Actor
- Years active: 2016–present
- Spouse: Marta Goenaga (m. 2025)
- Children: 2

Jaime Lorente López (born 12 December 1991) is a Spanish actor. He is best known for his role as Denver in the series Money Heist.

== Education ==
Born on 12 December 1991, Jaime Lorente López studied Dramatic Art at the Superior School of Dramatic Art of Murcia (ESAD Murcia) and earned a master's degree in advanced studies from the UNIR in Logroño.

== Career ==
Lorente performed in the theatre production Equus, for which he won the Best Actor Award in the first edition of the María Jesús Sirvent Awards. He has also acted in theatre productions such as El público, La vengadora de las mujeres, El secreto a voces and De fuera vendrá.

In 2016, Lorente began acting in the Antena 3 series El secreto de Puente Viejo as Elías Mato. In 2017, he portrayed "Denver" in the hit TV series, Money Heist, for which he was nominated for the "Best Supporting Actor on Television" award by the Spanish Actors Union. In 2018, he portrayed "Nano" in the Netflix Original Series Élite. In 2020 and 2021, Lorente portrayed Castilian knight and warlord Rodrigo Díaz de Vivar "El Cid" in the historical Amazon Prime Video series El Cid.

In addition to acting, Lorente has published a book titled A propósito de tu boca, a collection of poems that he started writing in high school. He has also made forays into music, releasing his first EP (La noche) in 2022.

In August 2025, it was reported that Lorente was preparing his directorial debut picture, The Bad Son, set to begin filming later in the year.

== Filmography ==
=== Television ===
Year	Title	Role	Notes	Ref.
2016	El secreto de Puente Viejo	Elías Mato	27 episodes	
2017–2021	Money Heist	Daniel "Denver" Ramos	41 episodes	
2018–2019	Elite	Fernando "Nano" García Domínguez	13 episodes	
2020–2021	El Cid	El Cid	10 episodes	
2023	Cristo y Rey (Untameable)	Ángel Cristo		
2024	Mano de hierro (Iron Reign)	Néstor		

=== Film ===
Year	Film	Character	Notes	Ref.
2018	Todos lo saben (Everybody Knows)	Luis		
2018	Historias románticas (un poco) cabronas	David		
2018	La sombra de la ley (Gun City)	León		
2018	Bedspread	Fran	Short film	
2019	¿A quién te llevarías a una isla desierta? (Who Would You Take to a Deserted Island?)	Marcos		
2022	42 segundos (The Final Game)	Pedro García Aguado		
2023	Tin&Tina	Adolfo		
2024	Disco, Ibiza, Locomía	Xavi Font		
2025	Hamburgo (Hamburg)	Germán		
2025	Reversión (Reversion)	Mario		
2025	Coartadas	Miguel		
2026	La silla (Tied Up)	Daniel Lonces		
2026	El mal hijo (The Bad Son)	—N/a	Director	
2027	Toda la suerte del mundo †	Paco		

== Music ==
Year	Title
2020	Corazón
2020	Acércate
2020	Romance (Theme from "El Cid"), feat. Deva and Natos y Waor
2021	Mirando al Sol
2021	Saturday
2021	Sra Smit
2022	Guapo y Loco
2022	La Noche
2022	7 DEMONIOS

== Accolades ==
Year	Award	Category	Work	Result	Ref.
2018	27th Actors and Actresses Union Awards	Best Television Actor in a Minor Role	Money Heist	Nominated	
2019	28th Actors and Actresses Union Awards	Best Television Actor in a Secondary Role	Money Heist	Nominated	
