= 5 More Minutes =

- Teaser poster
- Spanish: 5 minutos más
- Directed by: Javier Ruiz Caldera
- Written by: Berto Romero
- Produced by: Edmon Roch; Laura Fernández Espeso; Berto Romero; Javier Méndez; Guillermo Farré; Fran Araújo
- Starring: Berto Romero; Belén Cuesta; Javier Cámara
- Cinematography: Sergi Vilanova Claudín
- Edited by: Alberto de Toro
- Music by: Clara Aguilar
- Production companies: El Terrat; Ikiru Films; Movistar Plus
- Distributed by: Filmax
- Release dates: 19 September 2026 (Zinemaldia); 22 January 2027 (Spain)
- Country: Spain
- Language: Spanish

5 More Minutes (Spanish: 5 minutos más) is a 2026 Spanish fantasy comedy film directed by Javier Ruiz Caldera and written by Berto Romero, who also stars alongside Belén Cuesta and Javier Cámara.

It world premiered at the 74th San Sebastián International Film Festival on 19 September 2026 ahead of its 22 January 2027 theatrical release in Spain by Filmax.

== Plot ==
As a couple in crisis move to a house in the countryside to spend a weekend of rural tourism, they become trapped in a 5-minute time loop after the tourism company agent hands them the keys.

== Cast ==
- Berto Romero as Antonio
- Belén Cuesta as Bárbara
- Javier Cámara as Carlos
- Carlos Bernardino
- Marc Soler
- Clàudia Melo
- Puchi Lagarde
- Tian Tosas
- Nia Tosas

== Production ==
In January 2025, the film was announced as a project written and starred by Berto Romero and directed by Javier Ruiz Caldera during a Movistar Plus+ event presenting their slate of original films set to enter production in 2025. The film was produced with El Terrat (The Mediapro Studio) and Ikiru Films. Edmon Roch, Laura Fernández Espeso, Berto Romero, and Javier Méndez, as well as Movistar Plus+'s Guillermo Farré and Fran Araújo took over production duties, while Clara Valle entered as executive producer. In October 2025, shooting was reported to have begun in the province of Girona.

Ruiz Caldera opted to make the film with sequence shots with an exact runtime of 5 minutes.

== Release ==
Cámara attending the 74th San Sebastián International Film Festival in September 2026

The film premiered the 74th San Sebastián International Film Festival on 19 September 2026. For its international premiere, it was programmed at Fantastic Fest 2026. It was also programmed in the 'Sitges Collection' slate of the 59th Sitges Film Festival, as the opening film of the 28th Abycine festival, in the 'International Fantastic Film Competition' of the 19th Strasbourg European Fantastic Film Festival, in the Silver Méliès competition of the 26th Trieste Science+Fiction Festival, and in the 'Midnight Shivers' section of the 30th Tallinn Black Nights Film Festival.

Filmax is scheduled to release the film in Spanish theatres on 22 January 2027. Filmax handled international sales rights. Cinépolis acquired Latin American distribution rights.

== Reception ==
Enric Albero of El Cultural described 5 More Minutes as "a mutant film that draws its essence from the characters' ability to adapt to the new scenarios that unfold before them" (tonally evolving at the same time from misanthropy-tinged black comedy to survival horror), otherwise pointing out that it opens up an unexplored path for Spanish mainstream cinema.

Alfonso Rivera of Cineuropa considered that while the film "does not always necessarily hit the nail on the head, audiences will still have a whale of a time".

== Accolades ==
Year	Award	Category	Nominee(s)	Result	Ref.
2026	Fantastic Fest 2026	Audience Award		Won	
2026	74th San Sebastián International Film Festival	Silver Shell for Best Supporting Performance	Javier Cámara	Won	
2026	59th Sitges Film Festival	People's Choice Award for Best Feature film in the Sitges Collection Section		Won	
2026	19th Strasbourg European Fantastic Film Festival	Audience Award (International Fantastic Film Competition)		Won	
2026	19th Toronto After Dark Film Festival	Adam Lopez Audience Award for Best Feature Film		Won	
2026	19th Toronto After Dark Film Festival	Harvey Lalonde Volunteers' Choice Award		Won	
2026	19th Toronto After Dark Film Festival	Passholder Award for Best Director	Javier Ruiz Caldera	Won	
2026	19th Toronto After Dark Film Festival	Passholder Award for Best Screenplay	Berto Romero	Won	
2026	19th Toronto After Dark Film Festival	Passholder Award for Funniest Film		Won	
2026	19th Toronto After Dark Film Festival	Passholder Award for Best Editing		Won	
2026	19th Toronto After Dark Film Festival	Passholder Award for Best Choreography		Won	
2026	19th Toronto After Dark Film Festival	Passholder Award for Best Film to Watch with a Crowd		Won	
2026	26th Trieste Science+Fiction Festival	Audience Award for Best Film — Neon		Won	

== See also ==
- List of Spanish films of 2027
