= Tabakalera =

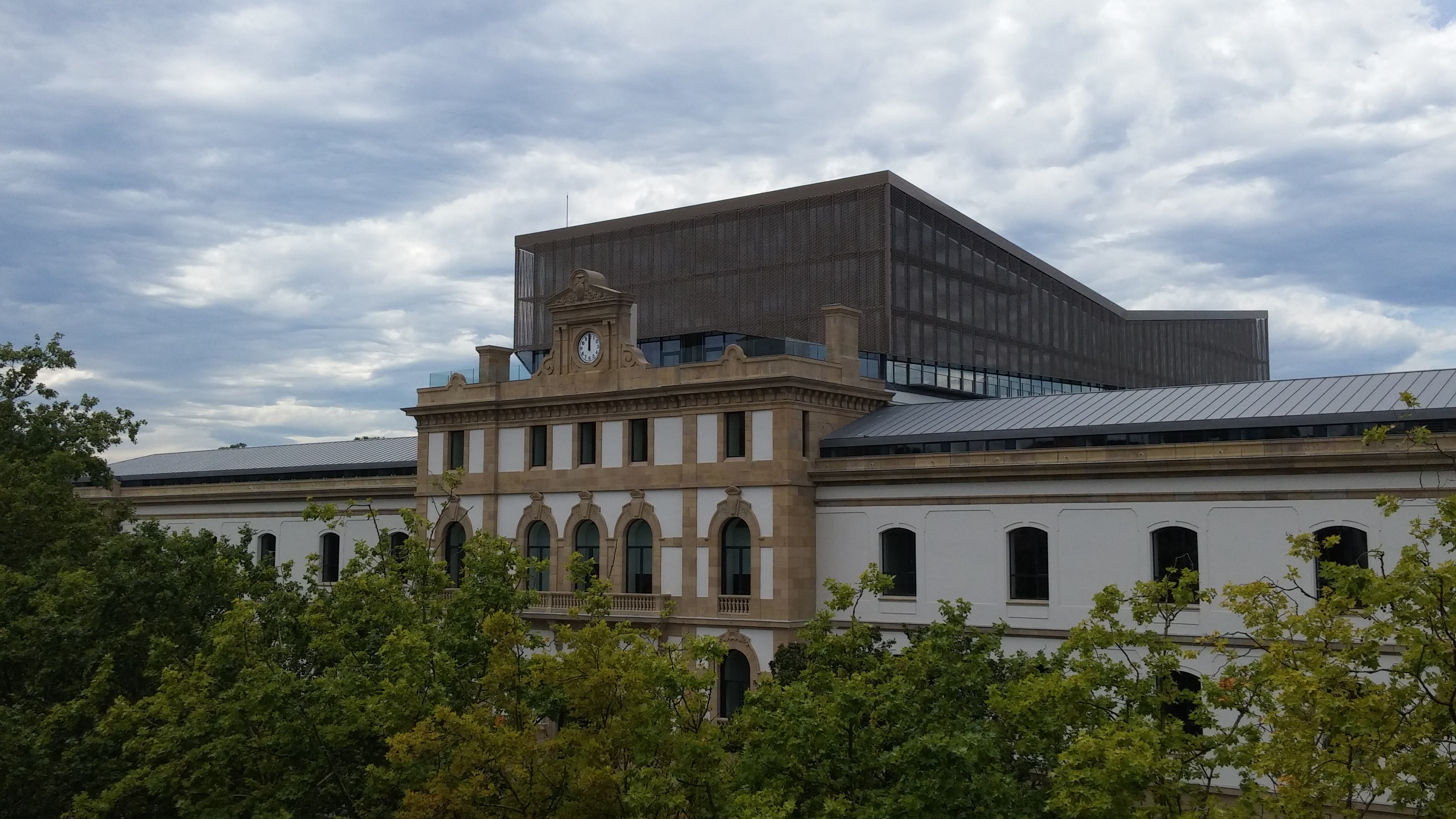
- A view of the renovated building

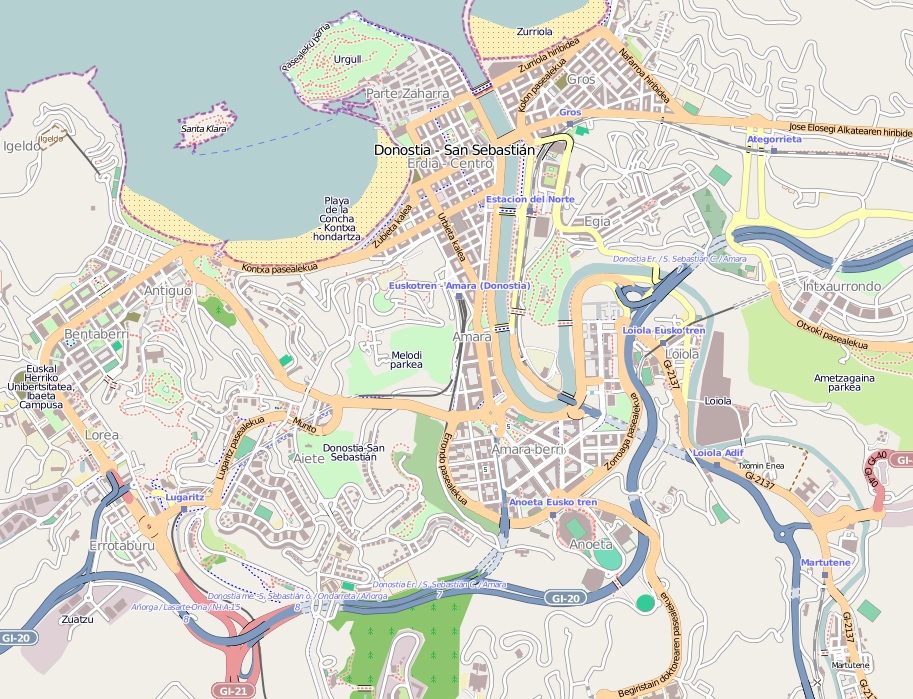
- Location within Donostia

General information
- Type: International Centre for Contemporary Culture
- Location: San Sebastián, Basque Country, Andre Zigarrogileen Plaza, 1, Spain
- Coordinates: 43.3167°N 1.9754°W

Technical details
- Floor area: 37,000 m^{2} (400,000 sq ft)

Website
- www.tabakalera.eu

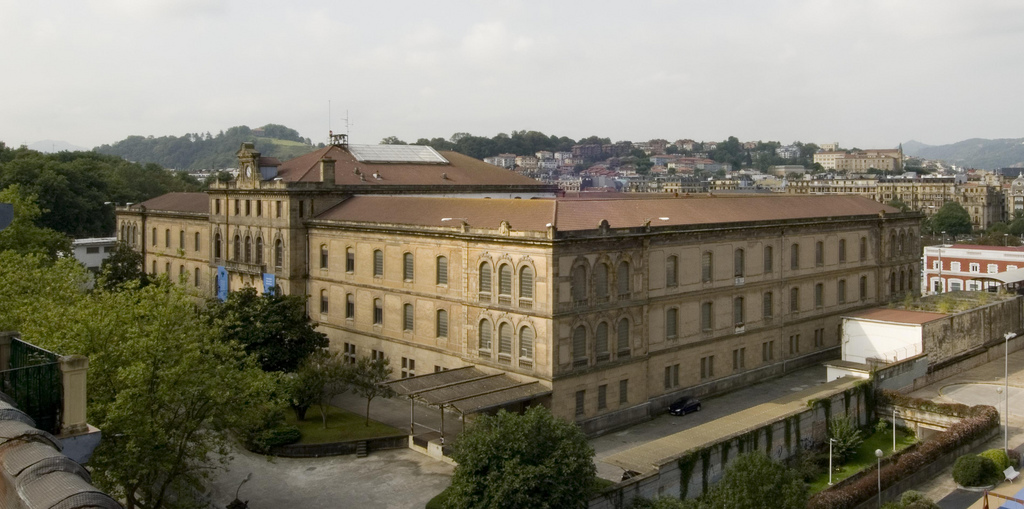
Tabakalera in 2007, before its renovation.

Tabakalera is a former tobacco factory in San Sebastián, Basque Autonomous Community, Spain, which was converted into a contemporary culture centre. Located in the Egia district of San Sebastián, next to the Estación del Norte railway station and the Cristina Enea Park, it takes up one of the biggest plots (13.277 m^{2}) of the urban area.

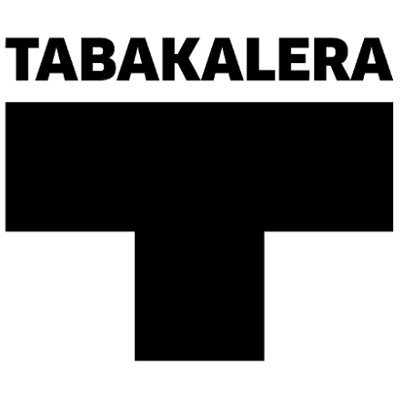
Tabakalera logo

== History ==
=== As an active tobacco factory ===
For 90 years (1913–2003) Tabakalera was a tobacco factory. It was one of the main employers in San Sebastián and most of the workers were women. The building took the name of the enterprise that managed the tobacco production in Spain until the privatisation process that converted Tabacalera into Altadis.

=== Closure and use as a cultural centre ===
In 2003 the factory was closed by Altadis. A year later, in 2004, the San Sebastián City Council, the Provincial Council of Gipuzkoa and the Basque Government bought the building in order to transform it into the International Centre for Contemporary Culture of San Sebastián.

Since 2007 Tabakalera organised a wide sort of activities. Exhibitions like Summer by Julian Schnabel (2007), No es Neutral (2008), Egiatik (2008) and Look Again (2009) or experimental shortfilm screenings like LABO, in collaboration with Clermont-Ferrand Festival.

=== Renovation and renewed cultural use ===
In 2010, refurbishment works began in the building. On September 11, 2015, the renovated building was inaugurated. The building contains exhibition halls, a multi-purpose plaza, a multi-purpose hall, a cinema theatre, a creation library called Ubik, media labs called Hirikilabs, spaces for art creation, a cafeteria called Taba, a residence for artists, and a four-star hotel, called One Shot Tabakalera House. It also hosts the headquarters of local culture institutions Kutxa Kultur, the Basque Film Archive, the San Sebastián International Film Festival, the Elías Querejeta Film School and the Etxepare Basque Institute.

== Gallery ==
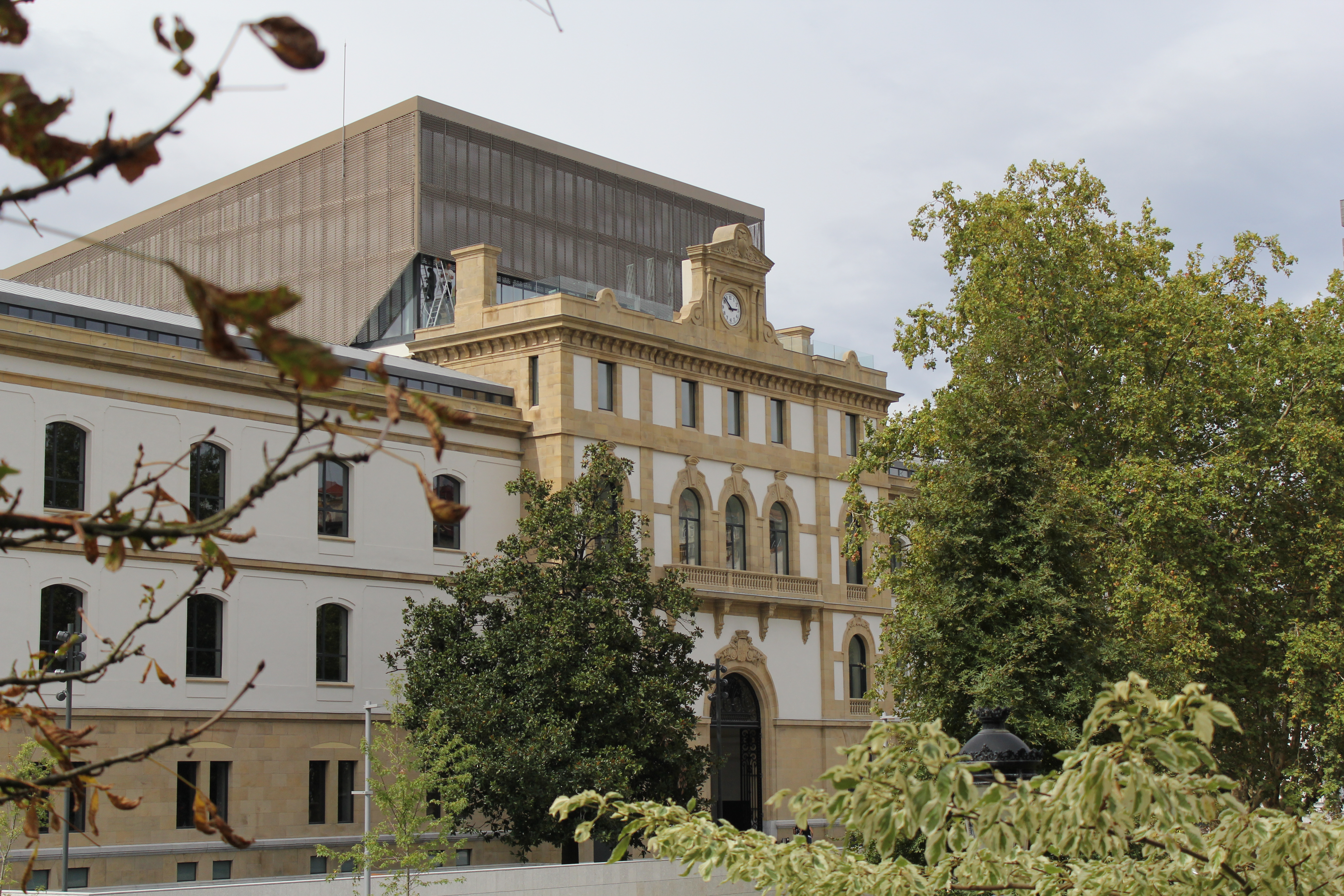
Tabakalera from Cristina Enea Park.

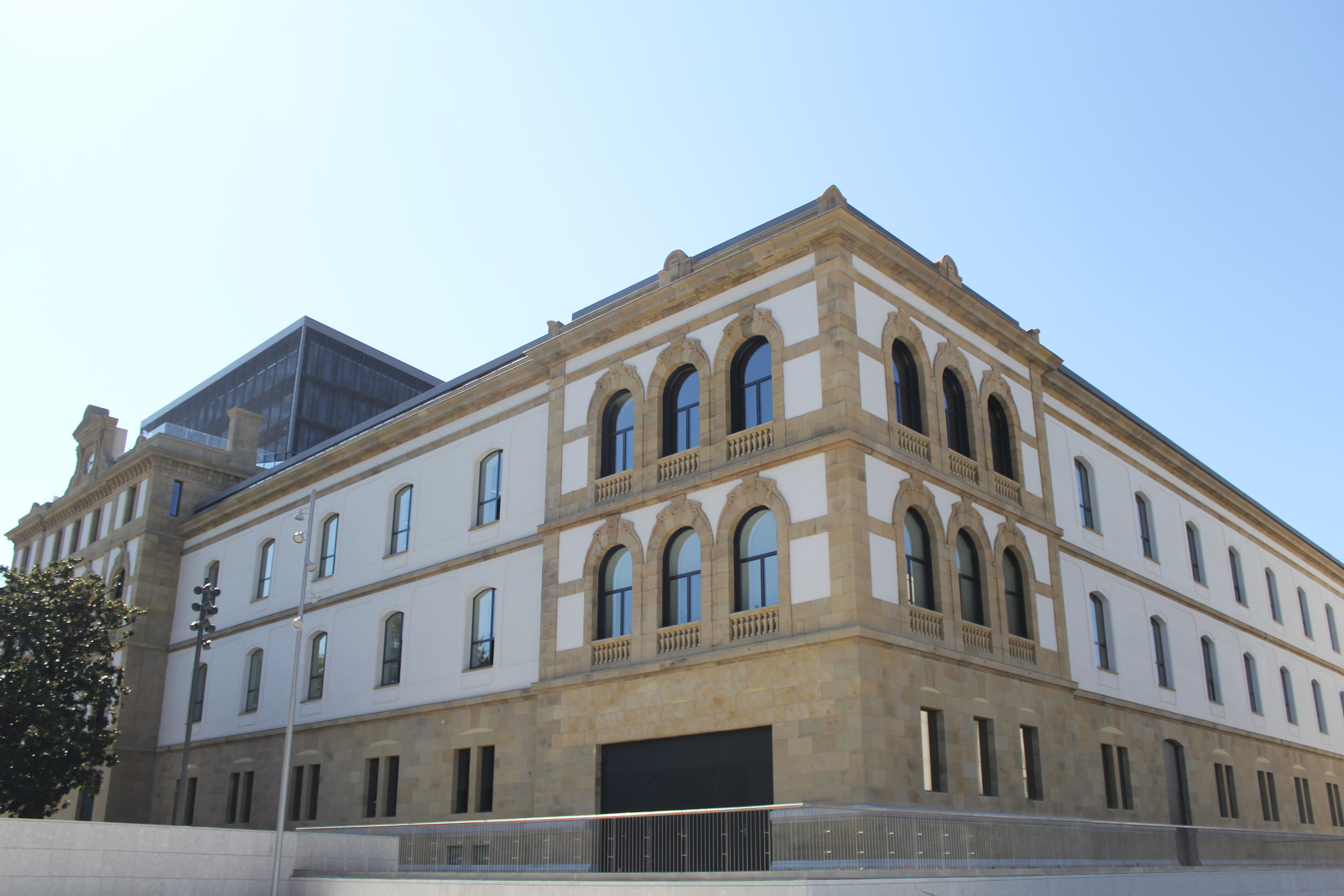
Tabakalera from Duque de Mandas Street.

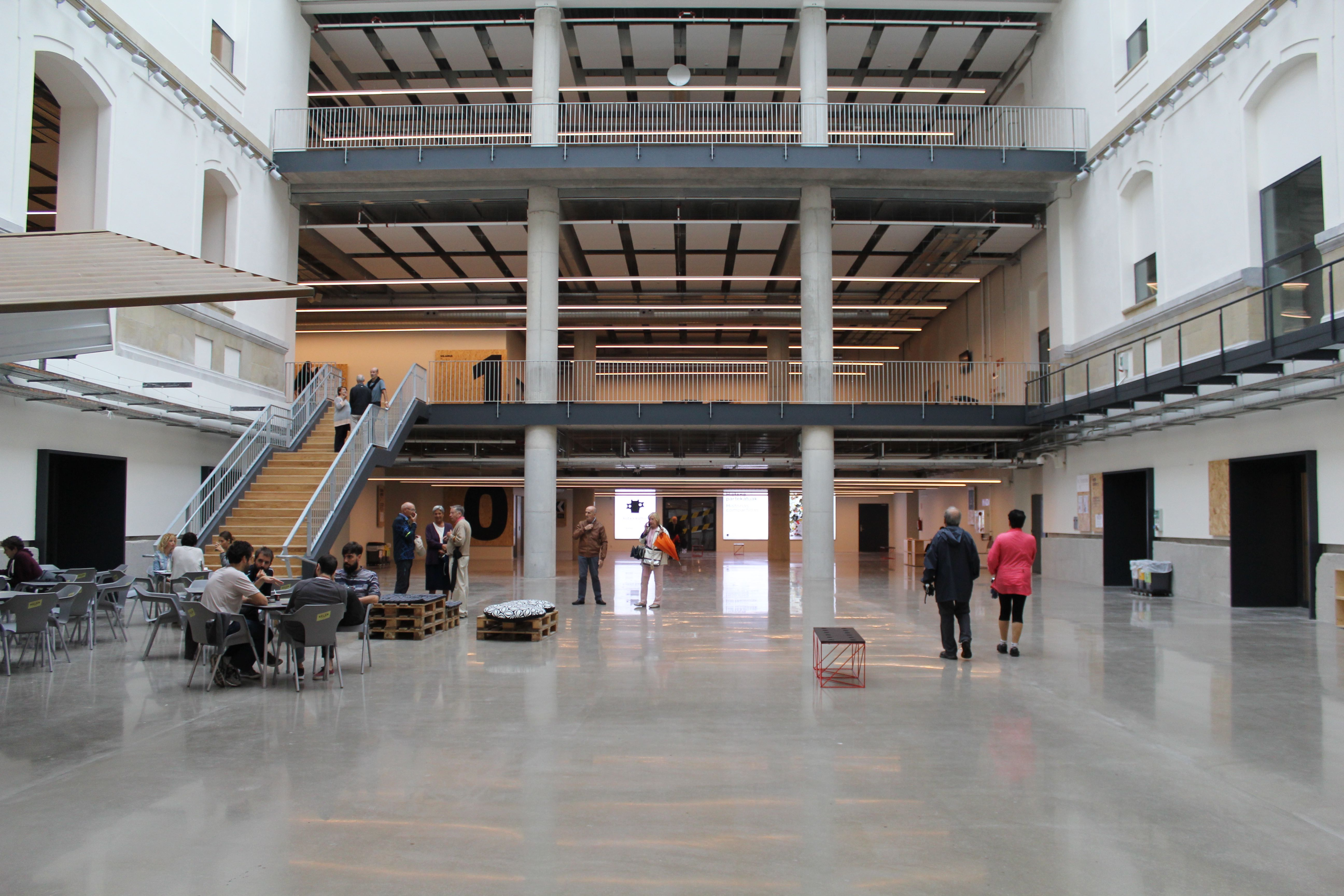
Tabakalera plaza.

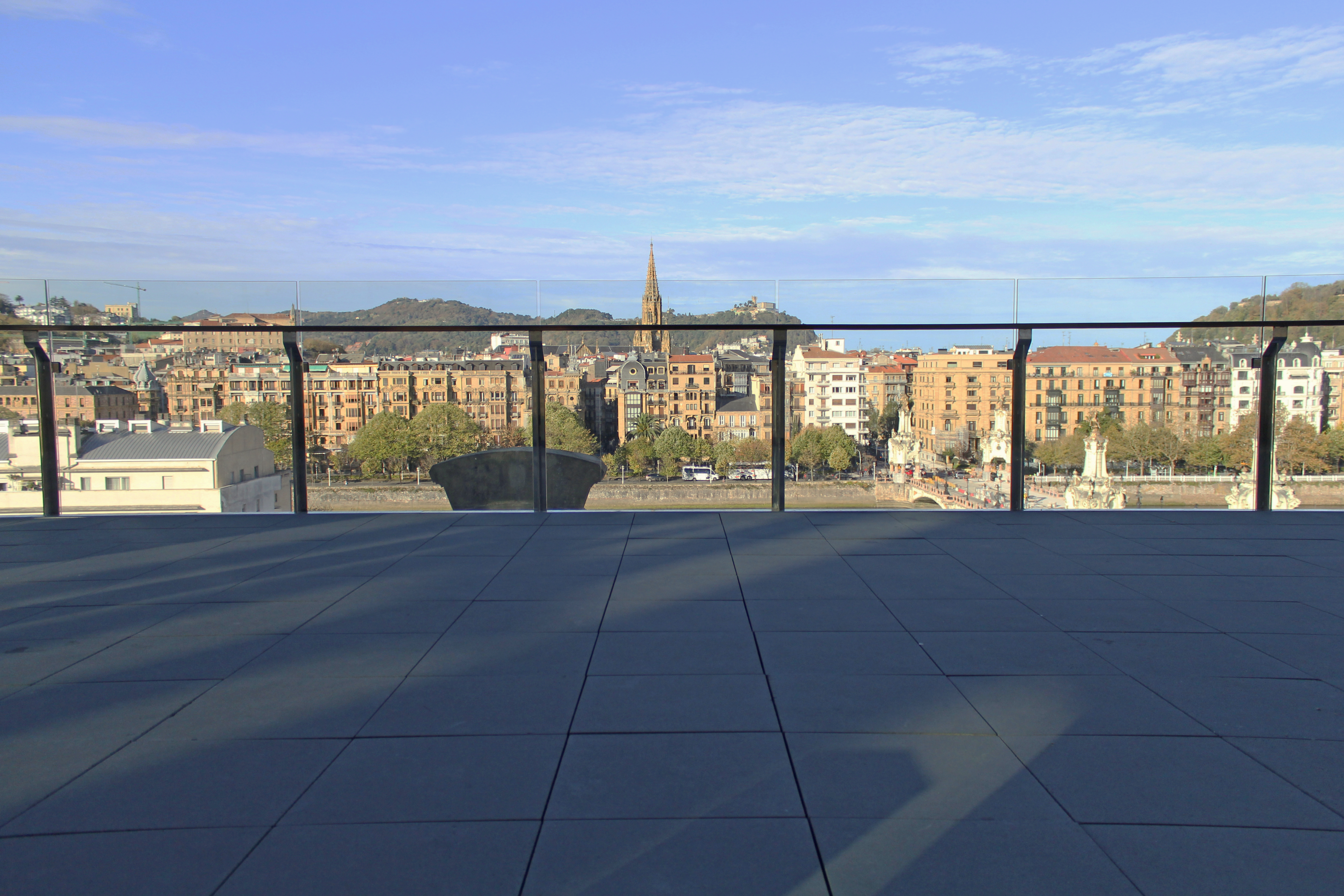
View of San Sebastián from the Terrace.
