= Teatro Victoria Eugenia =

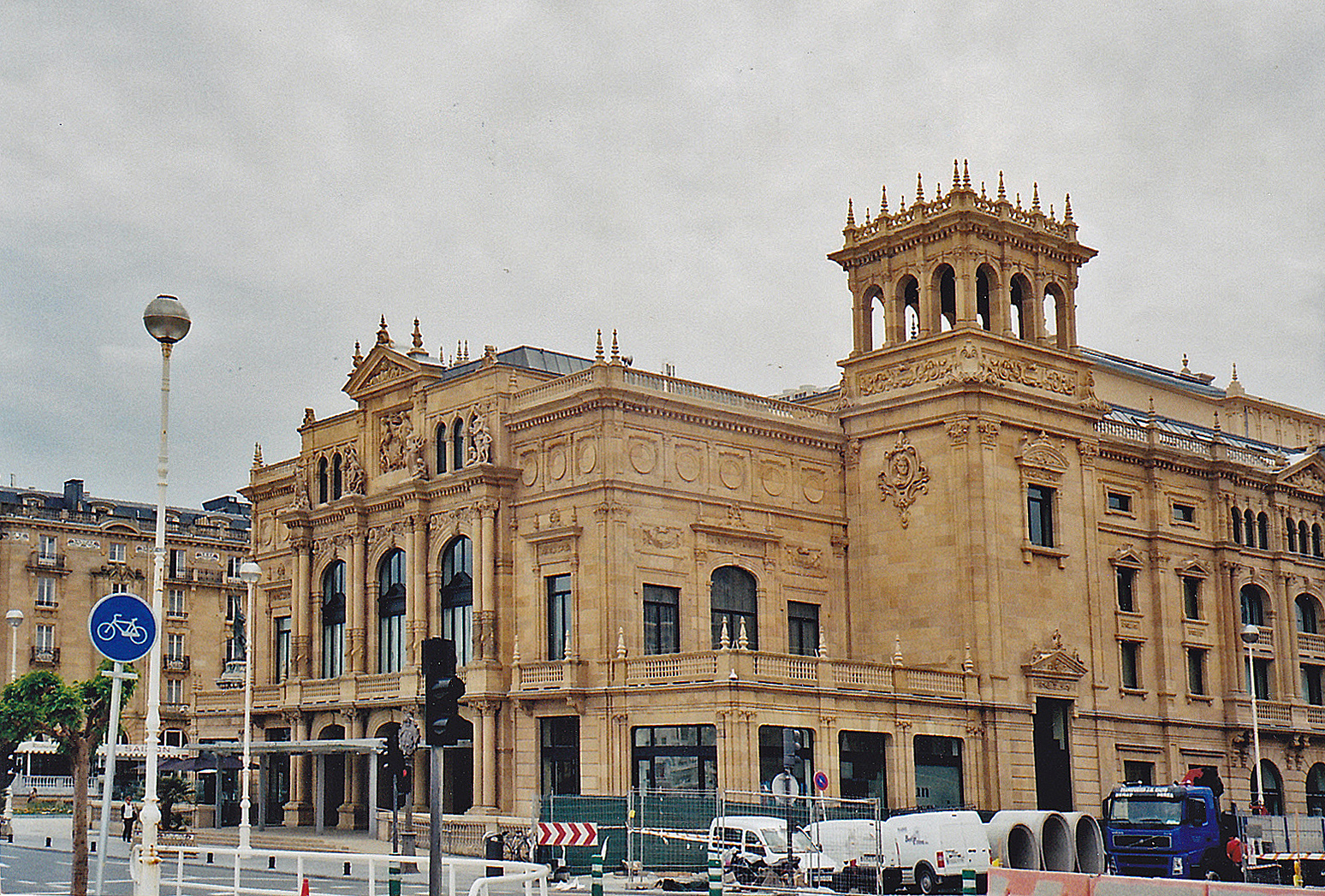
- Façade
- Interactive map of Teatro Victoria Eugenia
- Address: Argentinar Errepublika, 2 San Sebastián, Spain
- Coordinates: 43.322685°N 1.980774°W
- Owner: Donostiako Udala
- Type: Theatre; movie theatre; concert hall

Construction
- Opened: 20 July 1912
- Architect: Francisco Urcola

The Teatro Victoria Eugenia or Victoria Eugenia Antzokia is a theatre in San Sebastián, Spain. Sitting near the mouth of the Urumea, it is build in Renaissance revival style.

== History ==
The project developer was the Sociedad de Fomento de San Sebastián. The project was awarded to architect Francisco Urcola. Linked by Urcola himself to the Spanish Renaissance, the architectural style has been labelled by many authors as neo-plateresque. The venue ended up with a capacity of 1,322, less than the projected capacity. The theatre opened on 20 July 1912 with the play En Flandes se ha puesto el sol, a drama in verse written by Eduardo Marquina staged by the theatre company of María Guerrero and Fernando Díaz de Mendoza.

In 1953, it became the venue of the San Sebastián International Film Week (later known as San Sebastián International Film Festival). It underwent substantial refurbishment works from 2001 to 2007, when it re-opened.
