= Ramiro Pinilla =

Spanish writer

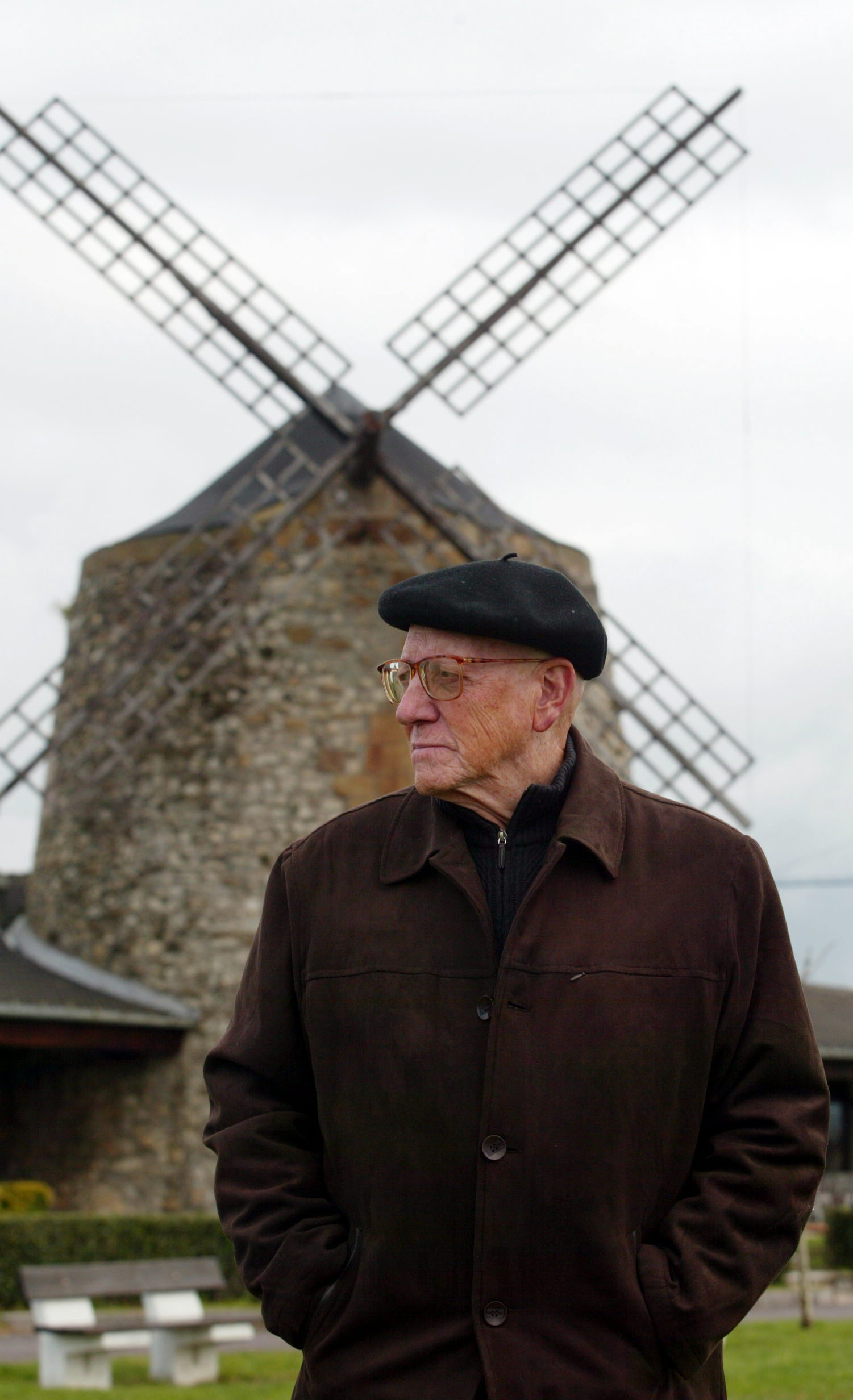

Ramiro Pinilla (1923–2014) was a Spanish writer. He was born in Bilbao (Basque Country) in 1923. He won the Premio Nadal in 1960 for his novel Las ciegas hormigas (The Blind Ants). He left the literary circuit for many years and did not emerge again until the 2000s, when he released his Basque trilogy of novels titled Verdes valles, Colinas rojas (Green Valleys, Red Hills) to great critical acclaim. He died in 2014.
