= Javier Ruiz Caldera =

Spanish film director

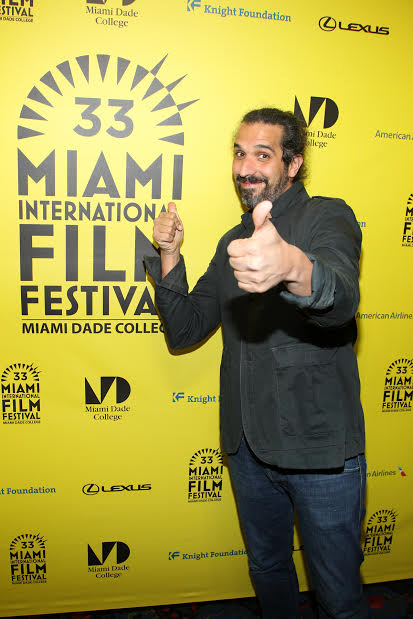
- At the 33rd Miami Film Festival in 2016
- Born: 1976 (age 49–50); Viladecans, Spain
- Education: ESCAC
- Occupations: Film director; television director

Javier Ruiz Caldera (born 1976) is a Spanish film director, primarily known for his comedy films.

== Biography ==
Born in Viladecans, province of Barcelona, in 1976, Javier Ruiz Caldera graduated from the ESCAC in 2000. Following his beginnings in cinema in the early 2000s underscored by short films such as Treitum and Diminutos del calvario, his 2009 feature debut, Spanish Movie, a spoof film, became a box-office hit in Spain, grossing over 7.6 million € in its domestic theatrical run.

In addition to his work in cinema, he has also directed episodes of the comedy series Mira lo que has hecho and in El ministerio del tiempo's episode "Tiempo de lo oculto" (2016).

== Filmography ==
Director (feature films)

- 2009 — Spanish Movie
- 2012 — Promoción fantasma (Ghost Graduation)
- 2013 — 3 bodas de más (Three Many Weddings)
- 2015 — Anacleto, agente secreto (Spy Time)
- 2018 — Superlópez
- 2020 — Malnazidos
- 2022 — Un hombre de acción
- 2025 — Wolfgang (extraordinari)
- 2026 — 5 More Minutes

Director (TV series)

- 2024 — Bandidos
