= Josean Bengoetxea =

Spanish actor (born 1964)

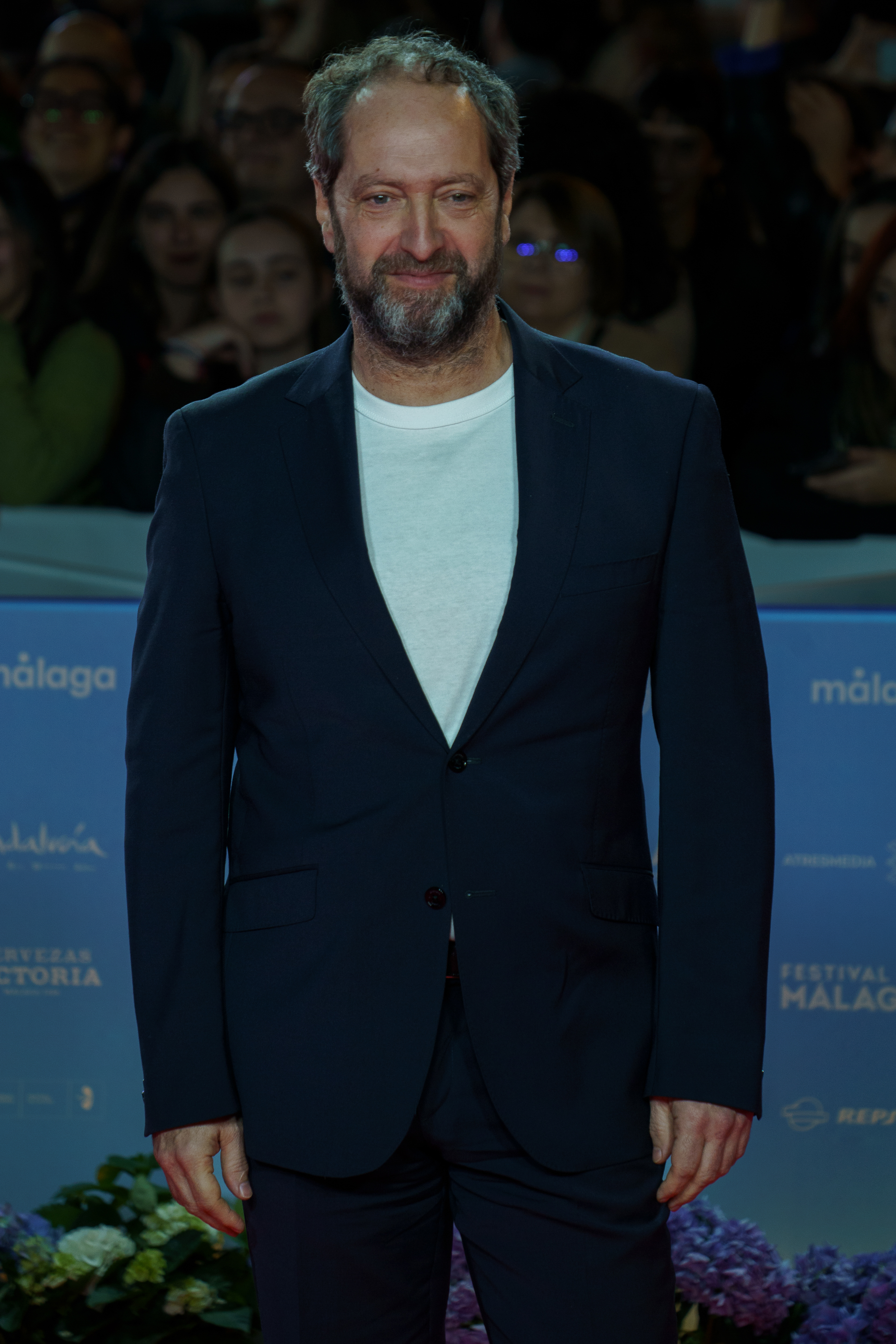
- Bengoetxea in 2025
- Born: 4 September 1964 (age 61); San Sebastián, Basque Country, Spain
- Occupation: Actor

Josean Bengoetxea (born 4 September 1964) is a Spanish actor.

== Life and career ==
Josean Bengoetxea was born on 4 September 1964 in San Sebastián, Gipuzkoa. He made his feature film debut in Yoyes (2000). He won the Best Male Actor award at the 2009 International Festival of Young Directors, held in Saint-Jean-de-Luz.

== Filmography ==
=== Film ===
Year	Title	Role	Notes	Ref.
2000	Yoyes		Feature film debut	
2005	El penalti más largo del mundo (The Longest Penalty Shot in the World)			
2005	Malas temporadas (Hard Times)			
2006	Kutsidazu bidea, Ixabel			
2005	Mujeres en el parque (Women in the Park)			
2009	Ander			
2009	Celda 211 (Cell 211)			
2010	Balada triste de trompeta (The Last Circus)			
2011	Urte berri on, amona!			
2014	Lasa eta Zabala			
2014	Loreak			
2014	Negociador (Negotiator)			
2016	Que Dios nos perdone (May God Save Us)			
2016	Igelak			
2016	Acantilado (The Cliff)	Martínez		
2017	Fe de etarras (Bomb Scared)			
2017	Oro (Gold)			
2017	Errementari			
2025	Jone, batzuetan (Jone, Sometimes)	Aitor		
2025	Faisaien Irla (Pheasant Island)	Koldo		
