= San Sebastián International Film Festival =

Annual film festival in Spain

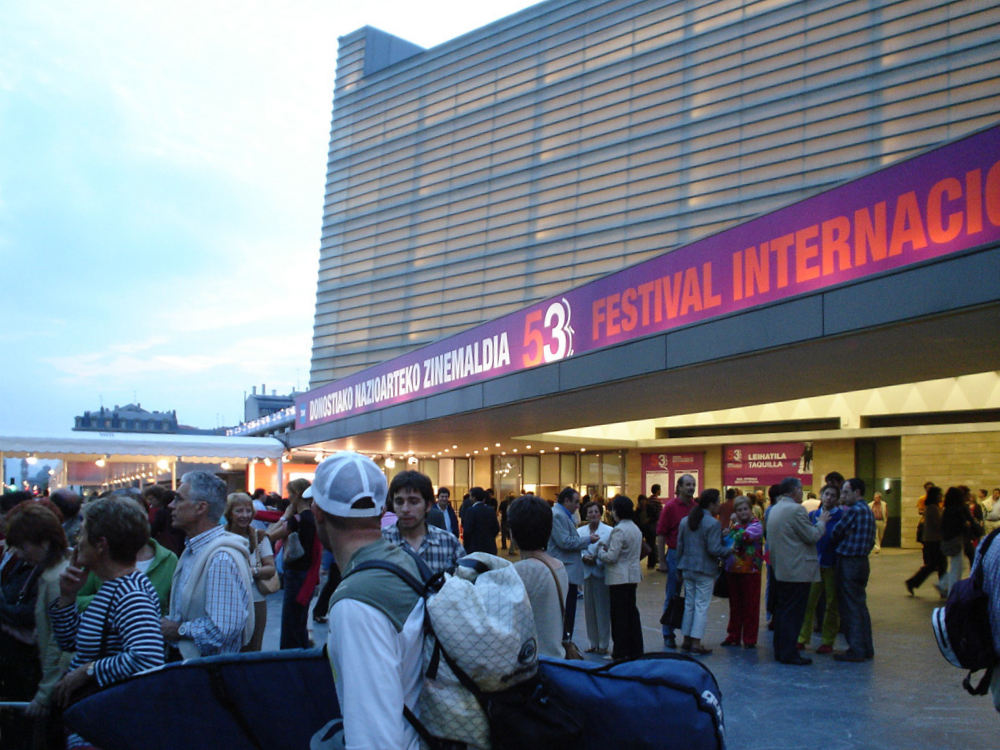
- The Kursaal during the 53rd edition
- Location: San Sebastián, Basque Country, Spain
- Founded: 1953
- Most recent: 2026
- Awards: Golden Shell, Silver Shells, Donostia Award, Sebastiane Award
- Hosted by: Festival Internacional de Cine de Donostia-San Sebastián, Sociedad Anónima
- No. of films: 200–250
- Language: International
- Website: sansebastianfestival.com

Current: 74th (2026)
- 75th (2027) 73rd (2025)

The San Sebastián International Film Festival (SSIFF; Spanish: Festival Internacional de Cine de San Sebastián; Basque: Donostia Zinemaldia) is an annual international film festival held in San Sebastián, in the Basque Country, Spain, generally in September. Founded in 1953, it is accredited by the International Federation of Film Producers Associations (FIAPF) in the "competitive film festivals" category.

Historically, the FIAPF's non-specialised competitive category was commonly referred to as "Class A". San Sebastián first received that status in 1957 and, after periods in other FIAPF categories, consolidated its position in the category in 1985. The festival's principal competitive award is the Golden Shell, awarded to the best film in the Official Selection.

José Luis Rebordinos has served as director of the festival since 2011. In April 2026, Maialen Beloki was appointed to succeed him on 1 January 2027.

== History ==
=== Foundation and FIAPF recognition ===
The festival was founded on 21 September 1953 as the Semana Internacional del Cine de San Sebastián (San Sebastián International Film Week). The following year it was recognised by the FIAPF as an international non-competitive festival. In 1955 it became an international competitive festival specialised in colour films. The 1956 edition was not recognised by the FIAPF, but in 1957 the festival was admitted to the international non-specialised competitive category, later commonly known as "Class A".

The festival's FIAPF classification continued to change during its early decades. It was reclassified as an international non-competitive festival in 1963 and returned to non-specialised competitive status in 1964.

Among the films presented during this period was Alfred Hitchcock's Vertigo, which screened in the Official Selection in 1958. Hitchcock shared a Silver Shell and James Stewart shared the festival's male acting award for the film. Star Wars was presented in the Official Selection in 1977.

=== Changes in status ===
The international film-festival circuit underwent substantial changes from the late 1960s and during the 1970s, including a shift away from the practice of national governments determining the films submitted to festivals and towards selection by festival programming teams. In Spain, these changes coincided with the end of the Franco dictatorship and the country's transition to democracy, which also altered the public institutions with which the San Sebastián festival had traditionally worked.

By the end of the 1970s, the FIAPF had raised concerns about the festival's increasingly local profile and its limited international promotion. In 1980 the festival adopted international non-competitive status and remained in that category for five editions, from 1980 through 1984. The FIAPF restored San Sebastián to the international non-specialised competitive category for the 1985 edition, initially for a two-year trial period.

=== Since 1986 ===
Film critic and writer Diego Galán was appointed artistic director in 1986, after having served as a consultant to the festival the previous year. He directed it from 1986 to 1989, returned as general consultant in 1993 and 1994, and served again as director from 1995 to 2000. Screen International credited Galán with strengthening the festival's international profile. During his first year as artistic director, the festival introduced the Donostia Award, an honorary career award whose first recipient was Gregory Peck.

José Luis Rebordinos became festival director in 2011. During the early years of his tenure, the festival sought to strengthen its industry activities, including the launch in 2012 of the Europe-Latin America Co-Production Forum, designed to connect film projects with international industry partners. In April 2026, deputy director Maialen Beloki was confirmed as his successor, with her term scheduled to begin on 1 January 2027.

== Organisation ==
The festival is organised by Festival Internacional de Cine de Donostia / San Sebastián, S.A., a publicly owned company incorporated as a sociedad anónima on 21 December 1990. The company is owned in equal shares by the City Council of San Sebastián, the Basque Government, the Provincial Council of Gipuzkoa and the Spanish Ministry of Culture. Its chairmanship is held by the mayor of San Sebastián.

The company's permanent headquarters are located in Tabakalera, the International Centre for Contemporary Culture in San Sebastián. According to its corporate information, the company's purpose is to organise the annual festival and to promote and organise other activities related to the dissemination of cinema. Films presented at the festival are selected by a Selection Committee chaired by the festival director and advised by a network of international delegates specialising in cinema and film festivals.

== Venues ==
The festival is held across a number of cinemas, theatres and cultural venues in San Sebastián. The Kursaal is its principal venue. The Kursaal's main auditorium is used for screenings from the Official Selection, as well as festival ceremonies and other events.

Other festival venues include the Victoria Eugenia Theatre, the Principal Theatre, Tabakalera, the Príncipe, Trueba and Antiguo Berri cinemas, the Antonio Elorza Velodrome and the San Telmo Museum. Tabakalera serves both as a screening and cultural venue and as the festival organisation's permanent headquarters.

== Sections ==
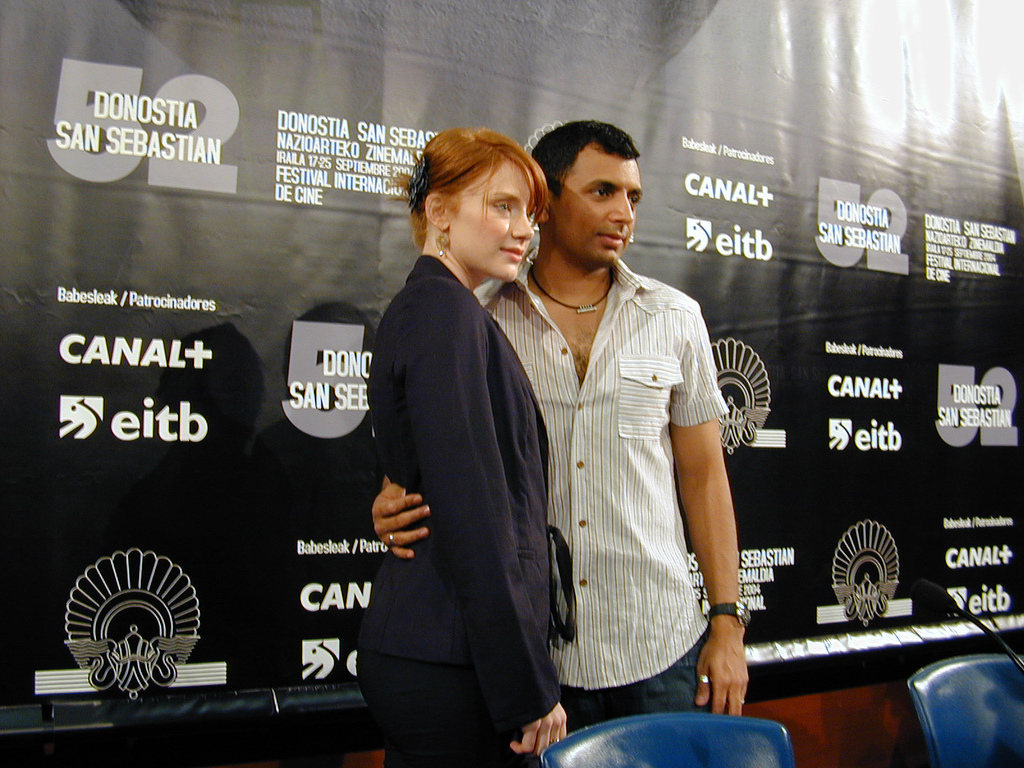
Bryce Dallas Howard and Night Shyamalan attending the 52nd edition of the festival in September 2004

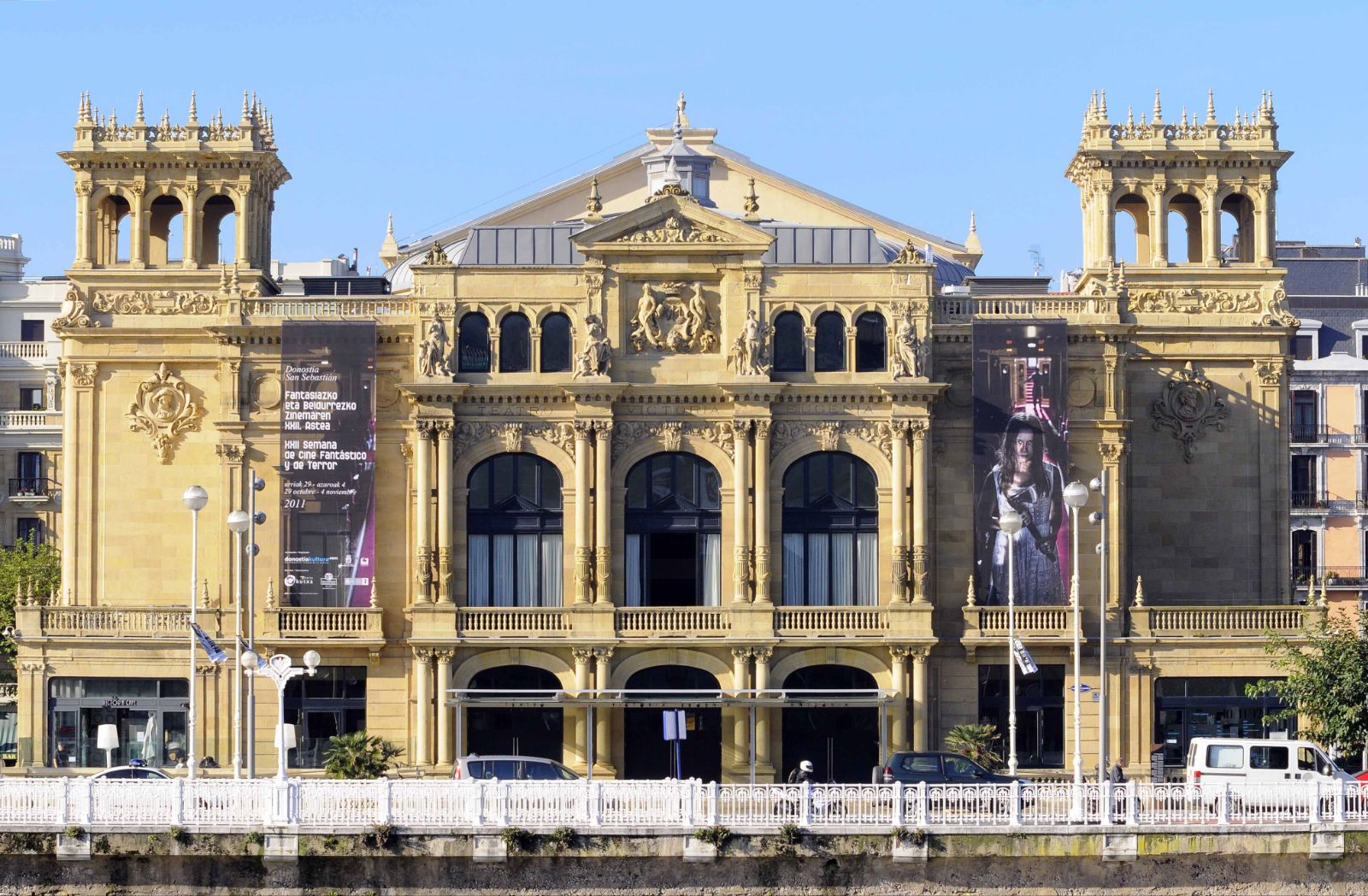
Victoria Eugenia Theatre

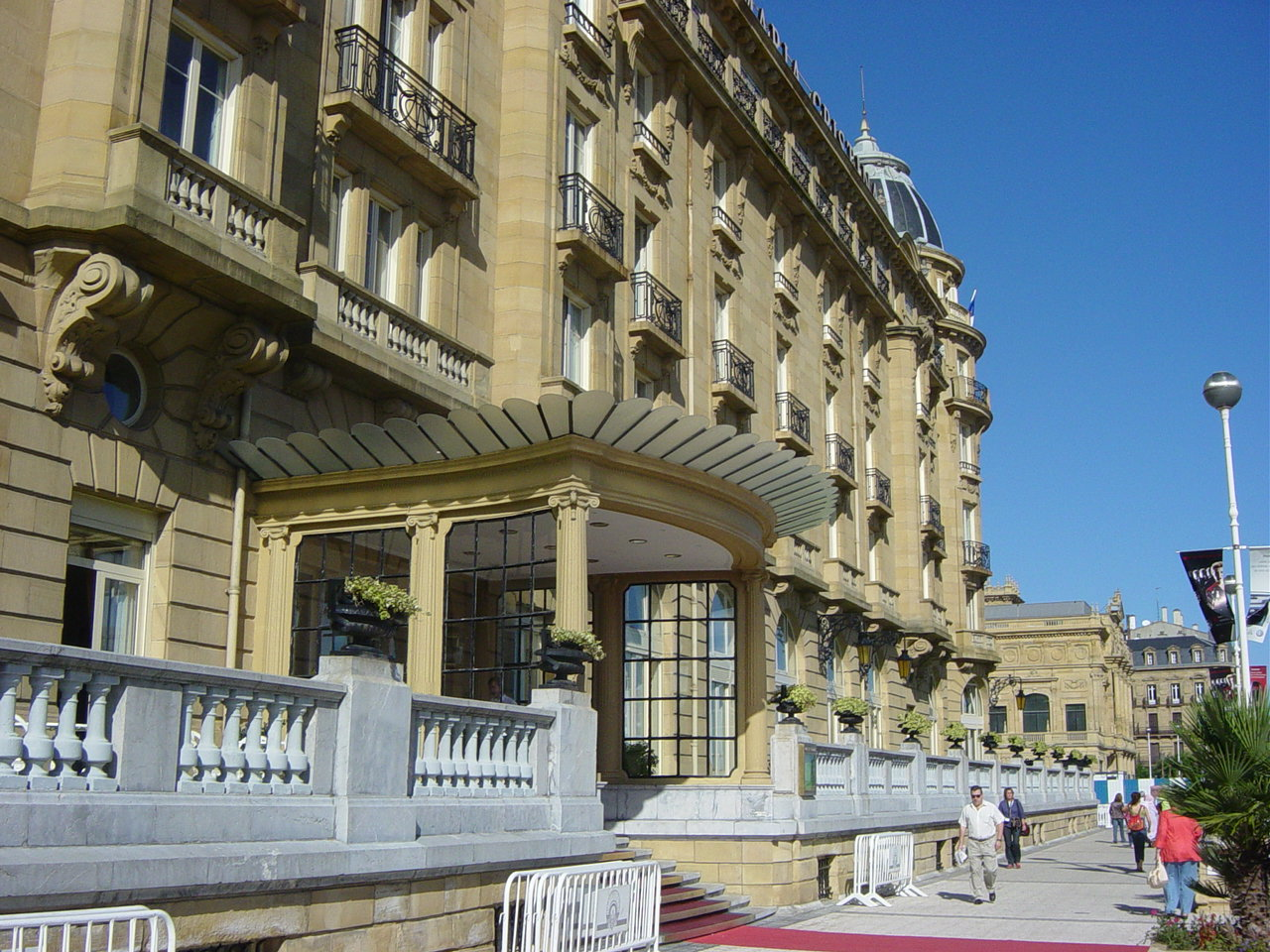
María Cristina Hotel during the San Sebastián International Film Festival

The festival programme combines competitive and non-competitive selections, student cinema, regional and national showcases, restored films and special screenings. The composition of the programme can vary between editions. Its principal recurring sections include:

- Official Selection – the festival's principal section. Films selected in competition are eligible for the awards decided by the Official Jury, including the Golden Shell for Best Film, the Silver Shells and the jury prizes for screenplay and cinematography. The Official Selection can also include films and special screenings out of competition.
- New Directors – a competitive selection of first and second feature films by their directors. Films in the section compete for the New Directors Award.
- Horizontes Latinos – a competitive selection of recent Latin American feature films that have not previously been commercially released or publicly screened in Spain. The section is also open under its regulations to films directed by filmmakers of Latin origin or focused on Latin communities.
- Zabaltegi-Tabakalera – a competitive section with no restrictions on length, format or subject matter, intended to accommodate films outside the more specific criteria of the festival's other sections. Films must be Spanish premieres.
- Perlak – a non-competitive selection of feature films that have received critical recognition or awards at other international festivals and have not yet been released in Spain. Films in the section compete for the City of Donostia / San Sebastian Audience Award.
- Nest – an international competition for short films made by students from film schools. Established in 2002, it combines screenings of selected student films with discussions and master classes involving film-industry professionals.
- Zinemira – a section devoted to Basque cinema. Films meeting the festival's criteria for Basque production, language or subject matter can compete for the Irizar Basque Film Award; the section also includes short films from the Kimuak programme.
- Made in Spain – a non-competitive showcase of recent Spanish cinema.
- Culinary Zinema – a section devoted to the relationship between cinema and gastronomy, organised with the Basque Culinary Center.
- Klasikoak – a programme devoted to classic and restored films, continuing the festival's longstanding retrospective and film-heritage activities.

Other recurring strands include screenings at the Velodrome, films for children, retrospectives and special screenings.

== Industry activities ==
Alongside its public screenings, the festival operates an industry programme for producers, distributors, sales agents, financiers and other film professionals. Its activities include project-development, co-production and works-in-progress programmes. Industry publications have identified the festival's relationship with Latin American cinema and its role in connecting European and Latin American filmmakers and producers as a distinctive part of its industry profile.

The Europe-Latin America Co-Production Forum was launched in 2012 to present developing feature-film projects from Europe and Latin America to potential international partners. It subsequently became one of the main components of the festival's industry programme.

In 2020 the festival reorganised its works-in-progress activities, introducing WIP Latam for Latin American films in post-production and WIP Europa for European productions. WIP Latam succeeded the long-running Films in Progress programme, while WIP Europa developed from Glocal in Progress. Selected films are presented to industry professionals with the aim of facilitating their completion and international circulation.

The festival's other professional and talent-development initiatives include Ikusmira Berriak, a residency and project-development programme, the Zinemaldia Startup Challenge, the Lau Haizetara Documentary Co-Production Forum and other meetings and activities for accredited industry professionals.

== Awards ==
=== Official Selection awards ===
Films competing in the Official Selection are judged by an international Official Jury. Under the festival's current regulations, the jury must grant the following awards:

- Golden Shell for Best Film
- Silver Shell for Best Director
- Silver Shell for Best Leading Performance
- Silver Shell for Best Supporting Performance
- Jury Prize for Best Cinematography
- Jury Prize for Best Screenplay

The Official Jury may also grant a Special Jury Prize to a film it considers deserving of particular recognition. The Golden Shell cannot be awarded ex aequo.

Until 2020, the festival presented separate Best Actor and Best Actress awards. In 2021 these were replaced by the gender-neutral categories of Best Leading Performance and Best Supporting Performance.

=== Other festival awards ===
Competitive and parallel sections have their own prizes. The festival's recurring awards include the Kutxabank-New Directors Award, the Make & Mark Horizontes Award, the Zabaltegi-Tabakalera Award, the City of Donostia / San Sebastian Audience Award, the Nest Awards, the Irizar Basque Film Award, the Culinary Zinema Award and the DAMA Youth Award.

The Audience Award is associated with the Perlak section and is decided by spectators attending its screenings.

Several prizes are also awarded by organisations independent of the Official Jury. These have included the RTVE-Otra Mirada Award, the Spanish Cooperation Award and the FIPRESCI Grand Prix for best film of the year.

The festival also presents the Donostia Award, an honorary distinction recognising a career in cinema. Introduced in 1986, its first recipient was Gregory Peck.

== Editions ==
The festival has been held annually since 1953. Recent editions for which individual articles exist in the English Wikipedia are listed below. The Golden Shell is the principal award for best film.

Edition	Year	Golden Shell
65th	2017	The Disaster Artist
66th	2018	Between Two Waters
67th	2019	Pacified
68th	2020	Beginning
69th	2021	Blue Moon
70th	2022	The Kings of the World
71st	2023	The Rye Horn
72nd	2024	Afternoons of Solitude
73rd	2025	Sundays
74th	2026	Tender Loving Care

The 74th San Sebastián International Film Festival took place from 18 to 26 September 2026.
