= Tyng =

Tyng is a surname. Notable people with the surname include:

- Anne Tyng (1920–2011), architect and professor
- Charles Tyng (1801–1879), sea captain, merchant, and memoirist
- Christopher Tyng (born 1968), American composer
- Harriet Morgan Tyng (1905–1952), American educator and poet
- Jim Tyng (1856–1931), first baseball player to wear a catcher's mask
- Stephen H. Tyng (1800–1885), evangelical Episcopal clergyman in New York City

== See also ==
- Ting (disambiguation)
- Tyngsborough
