= Bolz =

Bolz is a surname. Notable people with the surname include:

- Darrell Bolz (born 1943), American politician
- Eugen Bolz (1881–1945), German politician
- Hanns Bolz (1885–1918), German painter
- Harriet Bolz (1909–1995), American composer
- Kate Bolz (born 1979), American politician
- Lothar Bolz (1903–1986), German politician
- Nadia Bolz-Weber (born 1969), American theologian
- Norbert Bolz (born 1953), German philosopher
