= Das Philosophische Quartett =

Chat show on ZDF

- Presented by: Rüdiger Safranski; Peter Sloterdijk
- Country of origin: Germany
- No. of episodes: 63

Production
- Running time: 60 minutes

Original release
- Network: ZDF
- Release: 20 January 2002 – 13 May 2012

Das Philosophische Quartett (lit. 'The Philosophical Quartet') was a German chat show that aired on ZDF from 2002 to 2012. It was presented by the philosophers Rüdiger Safranski and Peter Sloterdijk who were joined by two guests. The name is a reference to Das Literarische Quartett.

The programme debuted on 20 January 2002 with the episode "Angst – Warum es keine Sicherheit gibt" (lit. 'Fear – Why there is no certainty/security'), with the mountaineer Reinhold Messner and the theologian Friedrich Schorlemmer as guests. A total off 63 episodes were produced over a period of ten and a half years.

== Episodes ==
1. "Angst – Warum es keine Sicherheit gibt", 20 January 2002, guests: Reinhold Messner, mountaineer, and Friedrich Schorlemmer, theologian
2. "Skandal – Vom Nutzen und Nachteil der Empörung", 19 February 2002, guests: Klaus von Dohnanyi, journalist and politician, and Martin Walser, writer
3. "Das Imperium schlägt zurück – Glaubenssache Amerika", 24 March 2002, guests: Claus Peymann, theatre director, and Hans Ulrich Gumbrecht, literature professor
4. "Die Schnellen und die Toten – Wettkampf als Lebensform", 28 April 2002, guests: Margarita Mathiopoulos, businesswoman and professor of international politics, and Franziska Augstein, journalist
5. "Raubtier Kapitalismus", 6 October 2002, guests: Norbert Bolz, communication researcher, and Hans-Olaf Henkel, former president of the Federation of German Industries
6. "Neuer Antisemitismus: das Gespenst geht um", 3 November 2002, guests: Luc Bondy, theatre director, and Adolf Muschg, writer
7. "Die Zukunft von Krieg und Frieden", 15 December 2002, guests: Peter Schneider, writer, and Richard von Weizsäcker, former president of Germany
8. "Leben ohne Arbeit – Krise der Erwerbsgesellschaft", 16 February 2003, guests: Peter Glotz, media studies scholar, and Ernst-Wilhelm Händler, writer and businessman
9. "Stolz und Sturz der Großmächte: Wer beherrscht die Welt?", 30 March 2003, guests: Egon Bahr, politician, and Horst Teltschik, politician
10. "Die Deutschen und die Macht des Neides", 25 May 2003, guests: Klaus von Dohnanyi, journalist and politician, and Heiner Geißler, politician
11. "Die Gesundheitsfalle – über die Herrschaft der Ärzte", 21 September 2003, guests: Klaus Dörner, psychiatrist, and Andrea Fischer, politician
12. "Entlarvte Biografie – über Intimität und ÖffentlichkeitBildschirmfoto8", 19 October 2003, guests: Joachim Fest, historian, and Fritz J. Raddatz, journalist
13. "Der essbare Zoo – Mitbürger Tier", 16 November 2003, guests: Thilo Bode, former CEO of Greenpeace, and Peter Kubelka, artist
14. "Macht Demokratie dumm? Bildung in Deutschland", 15 February 2004, guests: Hanns-Josef Ortheil, writer, and Konrad Schily, psychiatrist
15. "Wie frei ist das Gehirn?", 28 March 2004, guests: Bodo Kirchhoff, writer, and Gerhard Roth, brain researcher
16. "Wo endet Europa?", 2 May 2004, guests: Hans-Ulrich Wehler, historian, and György Konrád, writer
17. "Dem Volk aufs Maul geschaut – Wie Populismus die Demokratie gefährdet", 19 September 2004, guests: Mathias Döpfner, businessman, and Jürgen Flimm, theatre director
18. "Adolf Hitler – eine Medienkarriere", 24 October 2004, guests: Durs Grünbein, writer, and Jörg Friedrich, historian
19. "Vom Nutzen und Nachteil der Religion", 28 November 2004, guests: Bazon Brock, aesthetics scholar, and Martin Mosebach, writer
20. "Globale Katastrophe – globales Gefühl", 20 February 2005, guests: Josef Haslinger, writer, and Giovanni di Lorenzo, editor-in-chief of Die Zeit
21. "60 Jahre Kriegsende: Vom Nutzen und Nachteil der Geschichte", 10 April 2005, guests: Joachim Fest, historian, and Richard Schröder, theologian
22. "Lernen lernen – Vom Elend der deutschen Schulen", 5 June 2005, guests: Bernhard Bueb, educator, and Florian Langenscheidt, publisher
23. "Vertraut uns! Politik ohne Macht", 9 October 2005, guests: Gesine Schwan, president of the European University Viadrina, and Norbert Bolz, communication researcher
24. "Diktatur des Kapitals", 13 November 2005, guests: Hans D. Barbier, journalist, and Gunnar Heinsohn, social scientist
25. "Neues von der Seele", 11 December 2005, guests: Peter Bieri, philosopher, and Durs Grünbein, writer
26. "Wie viel Wahrheit verträgt die Demokratie?", 12 March 2006, guests: Christina Weiss, politician, and Meinhard Miegel, political scientist
27. "Wie viel Wert haben unsere Werte?", 9 April 2006, guests: Arnulf Baring, political scientist, and Jens Bisky, cultural editor at the Süddeutsche Zeitung
28. "Die schönste Nebensache? Fußball als Daseinsform", 28 Mat 2006, guests: Gunter Gebauer, sport researcher, and Wolf Wondratschek, writer
29. "Notfall Erziehung – Braucht Bildung Vorbilder?", 24 September 2006, guests: Reinhard Kahl, journalist, and Michael Klett, publisher
30. "Weltproblem Radikalismus", 29 October 2006, guests: Gunnar Heinsohn, social scientist, and Roger Willemsen, writer
31. "Schuld und Sühne – Putins Russland", 26.11.2006, guests: Egon Bahr, politician, and Boris Groys, art theorist and philosopher
32. "In Gottes Namen: Religion im Dienst der Republik", 25 February 2007, guests: Antje Vollmer, theologian and politician, and Jan Assmann, religion scholar and cultural historian
33. "Vom Nutzen und Nachteil guter Manieren", 29 April 2007, guests: Fritz J. Raddatz, journalist, and Asfa-Wossen Asserate, management consultant and writer
34. "68 und die RAF – eine romantische Affäre?", 3 June 2007, guests: Matthias Matussek, cultural editor at Der Spiegel, and Volker Schlöndorff, film director
35. "Sicherheit oder Freiheit: Wo bleiben unsere Bürgerrechte?", 30 September 2007, guests: Otto Schily, politician, and Frank A. Meyer, journalist
36. "Wie deutsch soll Deutschland sein?", 28 October 2007, guests: Necla Kelek, writer, and Maxim Biller, journalist
37. "Vom Glück im Leben", 25 November 2007, guests: Monika Maron, writer, and Wilhelm Schmid, philosopher
38. "Retten Imperien die Welt?", 17 February 2008, guests: Joschka Fischer, politician, and Herfried Münkler, political scientist
39. "Was ist links?", 13 April 2008, guests: Paul Nolte, historian, and Heribert Prantl, journalist
40. "Spitzensportler – Übermenschen unter sich", 1 June 2008, guests: Ines Geipel, academic and former athlete, and Reinhold Messner, mountaineer
41. "Ist die Welt noch zu retten?", 21 September 2008, guests: Franz Josef Radermacher, mathematician and economist, and Harald Welzer, social psychologist
42. "Russisches Roulette – Kampf um eine neue Weltordnung", 19 October 2008, guests: Karl Schlögel, historian, and Michael Stürmer, historian and journalist
43. "Markt der Illusionen: Wie der Kredit seinen Kredit verlor", 30 November 2008, guests: Albrecht Koschorke, literature scholar, and Rüdiger von Rosen, economist
44. "Überlebt der Stärkere? – Irrglaube Sozialdarwinismus", 1 March 2009, guests: Ernst Peter Fischer, historian and journalist, and Richard David Precht, writer
45. "Verantwortung und Risiko: Die Kunst, es nicht gewesen zu sein", 19 April 2009, guests: Beatrice Weder di Mauro, economist, and Bodo Kirchhoff, writer
46. "Zeitenwende: Was hält die Gesellschaft noch zusammen?", 7 June 2009, guests: Juli Zeh, writer, and Meinhard Miegel, political scientist
47. "Die Rückkehr zur Tugend", 13 September 2009, guests: Thea Dorn, journalist, and Klaus Mertes, writer and teacher
48. "Halbzeit der Krise: Eine Zwischenbilanz", 25 October 2009, guests: Gunnar Heinsohn, social scientist, and Heiner Mühlmann, cultural theorist
49. "Papst Benedikt XVI.: Kreuzzug gegen die Moderne", 29 November 2009, guests: Daniel Deckers, journalist and writer, and Alan Posener, journalist and writer
50. "Vernetzte Welt – Revolution der Anteilnahme?", 28 March 2010, guests: Joschka Fischer, politician, and Hans Ulrich Gumbrecht, literature professor
51. "Verlust der Mitte: In den Ruinen der Bürgerlichkeit?", 2 May 2010, guests: Bernd Kauffmann, cultural manager, and Moritz Rinke, writer
52. "Die Künste: Überflüssiger Luxus?", 6 June 2010, guests: Juli Zeh, writer, and Wolfgang Rihm, composer
53. "Formlos, haltlos, respektlos – wie das öffentliche Leben verkommt", 26 September 2010, guests: Thea Dorn, journalist, and Matthias Matussek, journalist
54. "Weniger Deutschland: Sterben die Deutschen aus?", 17 October 2010, guests: Gunnar Heinsohn, social scientist, and Michael Naumann, journalist
55. "Universum ohne Gott?", 28 November 2010, guests: Friedrich Wilhelm Graf, theologian, and [[]], journalist
56. "Sturm der Geschichte – Warum uns Revolutionen überraschen", 3 April 2011, guests: Thea Dorn, journalist, and Herfried Münkler, political
57. "Sturm der Geschichte – Sind Gesellschaften lernfähig?", 8 May 2011, guests: Juli Zeh, writer, and Daniel Cohn-Bendit, politician
58. "Irrationale Finanzwelt – Das Gespenst des Kapitals", 19 June 2011, guests: Joseph Vogl, culture scholar, and Gabor Steingart, journalist
59. "Arm aber sexy? Die Zukunft unserer Städte", 18 September 2011, guests: Michael Mönninger, architectural historian, and Werner Sobek, architect
60. "Fix und fertig – Die ermüdete Gesellschaft", 23 October 2011, guests: Manfred Lütz, psychiatrist and writer, and Elke Schmitter, writer
61. "Klimawandel – ein Glaubenskrieg?", 27 November 2011, guests: Gerd Ganteför, physicist, and Frank Schätzing, writer
62. "Europa ohne Euro – eine Spekulation", 25 March 2012, guests: Joschka Fischer, politician, and Juli Zeh, writer
63. "Die Kunst des Aufhörens", 13 May 2012, guests: Martin Walser, writer, and Michael Krüger, writer and publisher
