= Amand-Marie-Jacques de Chastenet, Marquis of Puységur =

French aristocrat

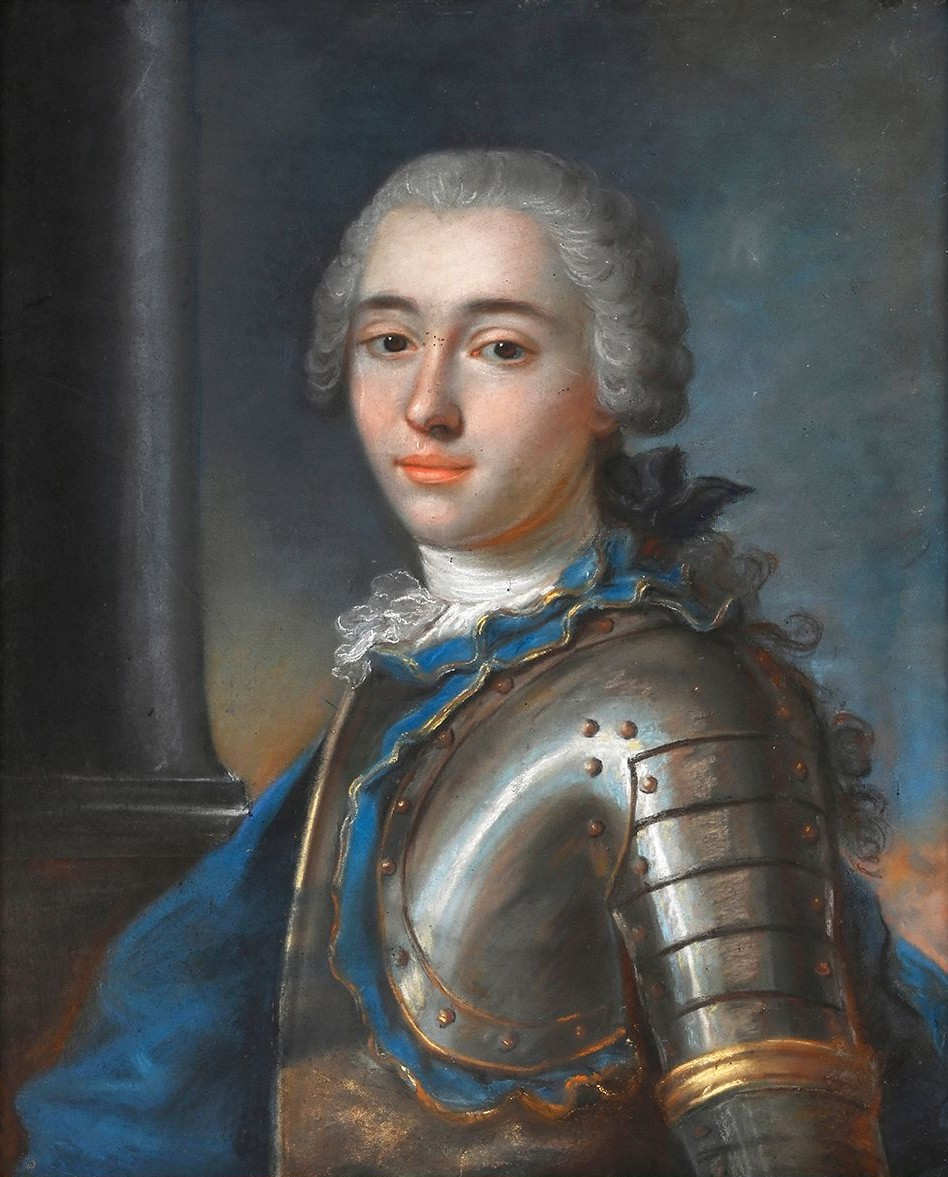
- Born: 1 March 1751
- Died: 1 August 1825 (aged 74)

Amand-Marie-Jacques de Chastenet, Marquis de Puységur pwee-say-GOOR French: [amɑ̃maʁiʒak də ʃastənɛ maʁkidpɥizegyʁ] (1751–1825) was a French magnetizer aristocrat from one of the most illustrious families of the French nobility. He is remembered today as one of the pre-scientific founders of hypnotism (a branch of animal magnetism, or Mesmerism).

The Marquis de Puységur learned about Mesmerism from his brother Antoine-Hyacinthe, the Count of Chastenet. One of his first and most important patients was Victor Race, a 23-year-old peasant in the employ of the Puységur family. Race was easily "magnetized" by Puységur, but displayed a strange form of sleeping trance not previously seen in the early history of Mesmerism.

Puységur noted the similarity between this sleeping trance and natural sleep-walking or somnambulism, and he named it "artificial somnambulism". Today we know similar states by the name "hypnosis", although that term was invented much later by James Braid in 1842. Some characteristics of Puysegur's artificial somnambulism were in any case specific of his method.

Puységur rapidly became a highly successful magnetist, to whom people came from all over France. In 1785, Puységur taught a course in animal magnetism to the local Masonic society, which he concluded with these words:

I believe in the existence within myself of a power.

From this belief derives my will to exert it.
The entire doctrine of Animal Magnetism is contained in the two words: Believe and Want.
I believe that I have the power to set into action the vital principle of my fellow-men;
I want to make use of it; this is all my science and all my means.

Believe and want, Sirs, and you will do as much as I.

— Marquis de Puységur

Puységur's institute for training in animal magnetism, Société Harmonique des Amis Réunis, grew rapidly until the Revolution in 1789. During the revolutionary era the institute was disbanded and Puységur spent two years in prison. After the Napoleons' overthrow, the new generation of practitioners of mesmerists (and later of hypnotists) looked to Puységur as their patriarch, and came to accept his method of inducing a sleeping trance in preference to the original methods of Mesmer. Puységur, however, always portrayed himself as a faithful disciple of Mesmer, and never took credit for having invented the procedure that is now known as hypnotic induction. His contributions were gradually forgotten, until Nobel prize-winner Charles Richet rediscovered his writings in 1884, and showed that most of what other people had claimed as their discoveries in the field of "magnetism" and hypnotherapy were originally due to the Marquis de Puységur.

Henri Ellenberger, historian of psychoanalysis and psychotherapy, wrote that Puységur was "one of the great forgotten contributors to the history of the psychological sciences." The details of the life and work of Puységur may be found in Ellenberger's book, The Discovery of the Unconscious, pp. 70–74. Ellenberger's view of Puységur was supported and amplified in Peter Sloterdijk's book Critique of Cynical Reason. In this work, Sloterdijk emphasized Puységur's contributions in his refutation of the common idea that intellectuals of the Enlightenment were not interested in the subconscious mind. Sloterdijk continued on this theme in his 1985 debut novel Der Zauberbaum, which is about a disciple of Puységur.
