= God's Zeal =

Book by Peter Sloterdijk

God's Zeal: The Battle of the Three Monotheisms
- Author: Peter Sloterdijk
- Original title: Gottes Eifer. Vom Kampf der drei Monotheismen
- Translator: Wieland Hoban
- Language: German
- Publisher: Insel Verlag
- Publication date: 1 October 2007
- Publication place: Germany
- English publication date: July 2009
- Pages: 218
- ISBN: 978-3-458-71004-2

God's Zeal: The Battle of the Three Monotheisms (German: Gottes Eifer. Vom Kampf der drei Monotheismen) is a book by the German philosopher Peter Sloterdijk, published in 2007. It traces the origins of Judaism, Christianity and Islam and criticises monotheism for leading to zealotry.

== Summary ==
Sloterdijk argues that the belief in transcendence emerged from a series of misunderstandings. These include the misunderstandings of vehemence and of the ability to think in hierarchies. Sloterdijk traces the emergence of the three major monotheistic religions. Judaism came to life as an anti-pagan protest against the Egyptians, Hittites and Babylonians. Its theology derives from a "triumph in defeat". Christianity added an apostolic message to the universalist claim of its predecessor. Islam intensified the universalist offense by making the expansion a military-political project. The three religions share a zealous claim to the truth of God which makes them highly confrontational, although this takes different expressions. Judaism is defensive and inclined to separatism, Christianity is expansive through mission, and Islam is expansive through Holy War. Belief is most likely an anthropological constant, but monotheist religions create conflicts which are unusually difficult to resolve. It is questionable if they can be harnessed. Sloterdijk brings up the ring parable from the play Nathan the Wise. He calls for the "zealot collectives" to become participants within a civil society.

== Reception ==
Doris Decker of Forschung Frankfurt stressed that the book does not only criticise problems, but also tries to offer solutions, "supported by an impressive line of arguments". This makes it "a fruitful and promising contribution to the debate about monotheism". Süddeutsche Zeitung's Alexander Kissler called the book "a true Sloterdijk, full of luster and excitement, wit and eagerness for conflict". He questioned Sloterdijk's suggestion that humour will help to solve the problems of monotheism, as the Jyllands-Posten Muhammad cartoons and Iranian Holocaust cartoon competition have demonstrated the existence of a "corroding laughter".

The Christian philosopher Renée van Riessen compared the book to Paul Cliteur's The Secular Outlook (2010). She complimented Sloterdijk for avoiding Cliteur's shallowness and "'missionary of enlightenment' attitude". Ultimately, however, she found Sloterdijk's adoption of Friedrich Nietzsche's "psycho-hygienic" opposition to monotheism to be condescending. "In sum", Riessen wrote, "both for Sloterdijk and Cliteur, monotheist religions are not judged in their own right, but merely evaluated according to their ability to restrain the existential rage of their more extremist followers."

In Critical Quarterly, Steven Connor described the book as an elaboration of Sloterdijk's Rage and Time, published in German the year before God's Zeal. Where the previous book describes the connection between religious and revolutionary rage, God's Zeal covers "the persistence and even revival of religious affect and motive in the modern world". Connor wrote that Sloterdijk's work is important because it allows a "radical critique" to exist outside of the "monopoly" of "philosophical supremacism".
