= Zhu Ting =

Zhu Ting may refer to:

- Zhu Ting (footballer) (朱挺, born 1985), Chinese association football player
- Zhu Ting (volleyball) (朱婷, born 1994), Chinese volleyball player
- Zhu Ting (fictional) (朱亭), a fictional character in the novel series Lu Xiaofeng Series by Gu Long
- Zhuting, Zhuzhou (朱亭), an urban town in Zhuzhou County
- Zhuting town, a township-level division of Jiangxi

== See also ==
- Zhu (disambiguation)
- Ting (disambiguation)
