= Not Saved =

2001 essay collection by Peter Sloterdijk

- Author: Peter Sloterdijk
- Original title: Nicht gerettet
- Translator: Ian Alexander Moore; Christopher Turner
- Language: German
- Publisher: Suhrkamp Verlag
- Publication date: 2001
- Publication place: Germany
- English publication date: November 2016
- Pages: 403
- ISBN: 9783518412794

Not Saved: Essays after Heidegger (German: Nicht gerettet. Versuche nach Heidegger) is a 2001 essay collection by the German philosopher Peter Sloterdijk. It contains ten essays and lectures that relate to the works of the German philosopher Martin Heidegger, and especially how Heidegger's thoughts have been received by his successors.

== Publication ==
Suhrkamp Verlag published the original German edition as Nicht gerettet. Versuche nach Heidegger in 2001. An English translation by Ian Alexander Moore and Christopher Turner was published by Polity in 2016.

== Contents ==
The essays and lectures concern the legacy of Martin Heidegger's works and how later thinkers have engaged with them. A recurring theme is that Sloterdijk presents Heidegger as a fallen figure due to Heidegger's attachment to the provincial, which made him unwilling to embrace cities and human expansion. Sloterdijk thinks it is possible to resolve Heidegger's flaws by regarding mobilization and anthropotechnics as fundamental parts of being human, and thereby affirm humanism despite the failure of people who follow typical humanist ideals in competitions over power.

English title	German title
"The Plunge and the Turn: Speech on Heidegger's Thinking in Motion"	"Absturz und Kehre. Rede über Heideggers Denken in der Bewegung"
"Luhmann, Devil's Advocate: Of Original Sin, the Egotism of Systems, and the New Ironies"	"Luhmann, Anwalt des Teufels. Von der Erbsünde, dem Egoismus der Systeme und den neuen Ironien"
"The Domestication of Being: The Clarification of the Clearing"	"Domestikation des Seins. Die Verdeutlichung der Lichtung"
"What Is Solidarity with Metaphysics at the Moment of Its Fall? Note on Critical and Exaggerated Theory"	"Was ist Solidarität mit Metaphysik im Augenblick ihres Sturzes? Notiz über kritische und übertriebene Theorie"
"Alētheia or the Fuse of Truth: Toward the Concept of a History of Unconcealment"	"Aletheia oder Die Lunte der Wahrheit. Zum Konzept einer Entbergungsgeschichte"
"Rules for the Human Park: A Response to Heidegger's 'Letter on "Humanism"'"	"Regeln für den Menschenpark. Ein Antwortschreiben zu Heideggers Brief über den Humanismus"
"Wounded by Machines: Toward the Epochal Significance of the Most Recent Medical Technology"	"Kränkung durch Maschinen. Zur Epochenbedeutung der neusten Medizintechnologie"
"The Time of the Crime of the Monstrous: On the Philosophical Justification of the Artificial"	"Tatzeit des Ungeheuren. Zur philosophischen Rechtfertigung des Künstliche"
"The Selfless Revanchist: A Note on Cioran"	"Der selbstlose Revanchist. Notiz über Cioran"
"An Essential Tendency toward Nearness Lies in Dasein: Marginalia to Heidegger's Doctrine of Existential Place"	"»Im Dasein liegt eine wesenhafte Tendenz auf Nähe«. Marginalie zu Heideggers Lehre vom existentialen Ort"

== Reception ==
In Phenomenological Reviews, Anthony Crisafi described the book's content as "extended dialogues with both the reader and with a wide range of thinkers, as well as a developed depth and breadth of intellectual knowledge", written in "dense prose, which is never stultifying but rather engaging and erudite".
