= List of compositions by Nancy Van de Vate =

American-born composer living in Austria (1930–2023)

This is a list of compositions by Nancy Van de Vate, including works in several genres, such as operas, orchestral music including concertos, chamber music for various ensembles, chorals music and songs.

== Opera ==
=== Hamlet (2009) ===
- Opera in five acts, after Shakespeare
- Recorded 2011, premiered by the University of Mississippi's Opera Theatre Group April 18, 2015

=== Where the Cross is Made (2003) ===
- Opera in three acts, Libretto based on the play by Eugene O'Neill
- 60' VM
- Premiere: 2005, Normal IL, US, Illinois State University Opera, Karyl K. Carlson; Cond. Rec. VMM 4006, 2006, Michelle Vought, sop, Christopher Hollingsworth, bar, Timothy Schmidt, bass, Clinton Desmond, ten. Soprano, tenor, baritone, bass, 1/1/1/1 – 1 - 2 perc, pn/cel-str.(3,3,2,2,2)

=== Im Westen nichts Neues (2002) ===
- Opera in three acts, libretto after the novel by Erich Maria Remarque95', VM.
- Premiere: 2003, Osnabrück Opera, Germany, Hermann Bäumer, Cond. (see below)

=== All Quiet on the Western Front (1999) ===
- Opera in three acts, libretto after the novel by Erich Maria Remarque
- 95', VM.
- Premiere: 2003, New York City Opera ("Showcasing American Composers"), George Manahan, Cond. Rec. VMM 4004 (2 CDs), 2002, Moravian Philharmonic and soloists from the Janáček Opera, Toshiyuki Shimada, Cond.
- 2 tenors, 2 baritones, bass, soprano, mezzo, orch: 2/2/2/2 - 2/2/2/0 - 3 perc - hp – str

=== Nemo: Jenseits von Vulkania (1995) ===
- Opera in four acts, libretto: Allen Cortes and Nancy Van de Vate
- 150', VM
- Recording: VMM 4002 (2 CDs), 2001. Moravian Philharmonic and soloists from the Janáček Opera, Toshiyuki Shimada, Cond.
- 2 sopranos, alto, tenor, baritone, bass, SATB chorus - orch: 3/3/3/3 -4/4/3/1 - timp, 3 perc - hp, pf, cel – str

=== Nemo: Beyond Vulkania ===
- Opera in four acts in English, with medium orchestra

== Orchestral music ==
=== Suite for String Orchestra after Mechthild from Magdeburg (2000) ===
- 8', Vienna Masterworks
- Premiere: Oct. 3, 2000, Scarlatti di Napoli Orchester, Rome, Italy, Daniele Moles, Cond.

=== Adagio and Rondo for Violin and String Orchestra (1994) ===
- 9'42", VM
- Premiere: July 25, 1994, Sala Balowa, Lancut, Poland, Joanna Kawalla, vn, Lancut Festival Orchestra, S. Kawalla; Cond. Rec. VMM CD 3025, 1994, Joanna Kawalla, Vn, Koszalin Philharmonic, Poland, S. Kawalla; Cond.

=== Concerto for Piano and Orchestra (1968, rev. 1994) ===
- 22' VM
- Premiere: April 26, 1969, University of Alabama Symphony, Tuscaloosa, Alabama; Franklin Choset; Cond., Sallie Schoen, pf; Prem. (rev.) Nov. 11,1993, Koszalin, Poland, Makiko Hirashima, pf, Koszalin Phil. Orch., Szymon Kawalla; Cond. Rec. VMM CD 3025, 1994, KSPO, Hirashima, Kawalla
- 3/2/2/2 - 4/2/3/1 - timp, 2 perc - str

=== Four Somber Songs (1992) ===
- Texts by Georg Trakl, Edgar Allan Poe, William Blake, Paul Verlaine
- 13', VM
- Rec. VMM CD 3013, 1992, Slovak Radio Orchestra, Szymon Kawalla; Cond., Sulie Girardi, mezzo
- 2/2/2/2 - 2/0/1/1 - 1 perc - hp - str

=== Viola Concerto (1990) ===
- 16', VM
- Premiere: September 14, 1993, Kraków, Poland, Grigorij Zhislin, Viola, Polish Radio Orch. of Kraków, José Maria Florêncio Junior; Cond. Rec. VMM CD 3023, 1993, PRSO, Zhislin, Florêncio
- 3/3/3/3 - 4/3/3/1 – timp, 3 perc - hp, pf, cel - str

=== Kraków Concerto for Percussion and Orchestra (1988) ===
- 25', VM
- Premiere: November 28, 1989, Kraków Percussion Ensemble, PRO, Szymon Kawalla; Cond. Rec. Conifer (London) CDCF 185 (1988–92); VMM CD 3015, 1992, PRO, Kawalla
- 3/2/2/2 - 4/3/3/1 – timp. 5 perc - hp, pf/cel - str

=== Chernobyl (1987) ===
- 13', VM
- Premiere: May 18, 1995, Vienna, Austria, Niederösterreichisches Tonkünstlerorchester, Peter Keuschnig; Cond. Rec. Conifer CDCF 168 (1988–92), VMM CD 3010, 1992, PRO, Kawalla
- 3/3/3/3 - 4/3/3/1 - timp, 3 perc - cel, hp, pf - str (12/10/8/8/6)

=== Suite für Chor aus "Nemo" (1997) ===
- Texts: Allen Cortes and Nancy Van de Vate, 24', Rec. VMM CD 3043, 1998, VMM 4001, 1999, Ars Brunensis Chorus, Moravian Philharmonic, Toshiyuki Shimada; Cond.
- SATB, Boy soprano, 3/3/3/3 - 4/4/3/1 - 4 perc - hp – str

=== Choral Suite from "Nemo" ===
- English, as above

=== An American Essay (1994) ===
- Texts: Walt Whitman
- 30', VM
- Premiere: June 29, 1994, Koszalin, Poland, Chorus Soranus (Denmark), Christine Marstrand, soprano, Knud Vad, Choral Dir. Koszalin Philharmonic Orchestra. Kawalla, Cond. Rec. VMM CD 3025, 1994, KSO, Chorus Soranus, Marstrand, Kawalla
- SATB, soprano 2/2/2/2 - 2/0/1/0 - 2 perc - hp - str

=== Voices of Women (1993) ===
- Texts: James Joyce, Walt Whitman, Charles Baudelaire, anon. Provençal 12th Cent
- 20', VM
- Premiere 1993, Koszalin, Poland, Silesian University Choir, Sulie Girardi, Mezzo-soprano, Halina-Gorniewicz, Choral Director, Koszalin State Philharmonic Orchestra, Kawalla;
- Recording: VMM CD 3022, 1993, Silesian University Choir, Sulie Girardi, KSPO, Kawalla. SSA soprano, mezzo, picc/1/0/1/0 – 2 perc – hp, cel, str

=== How Fares the Night? (1993) ===
- Text: anon. Chinese, 5th century BC, trans. Mimi Tsoi,
- 4'30", VM
- Premiere: 1993, Koszalin, Poland, Silesian University Choir, Joanna Kawalla, Vn, Halina Gorniewicz, Choral Director, Koszalin State Phil. Orch., Szymon Kawalla, Cond.
- Recording: 1993, Silesian University Choir, Joanna Kawalla, Vn, KSPO, Szymon Kawalla
- SSAA, solo violin, string orchestra

== Theatre music ==
=== Venal Vera: Ode to a Gezira Lovely (2000) ===
- 10' VM
- Premiere: November 4, 2000, Toronto, Canada, Michelle Vought, soprano; Rec: VMM 4003, 2001, Michelle Vought, soprano
- soprano or mezzo, bass cl, and 1 perc; or voice with tape

=== Cocaine Lil (1986) ===
- 15', VM
- Premiere: April 22, 1988, ensemble belcanto, Bremen, Germany; Recordings: Koch Schwann/Aulos CD 3-1432-2,1994, ensemble belcanto, Dietburg Spohr; VMM 2026, 1998, Blair Resicka; VMM 2034, 2001, Michelle Vought
- mezzo or soprano, 4-8 jazz singers with small percussion.

=== A Night in the Royal Ontario Museum (1983) ===
- Text: Margaret Atwood
- 12', VM
- Premiere: April 13, 1984, Marilyn DeReggi, Soprano, College Park, Maryland
- Recorded VMM 2028, 1998, Michelle Vought
- soprano and CD (Tape)

=== Eine Nacht im Royal Ontario Museum (1983) ===
- 12', VM
- Recorded VMM 4001, 1999, Sulie Girardi

== Music for strings ==
=== String Quartet No. 2 (2005) ===
- 17', VM
- Premiere: Nov. 25, 2005, Austrian Radio Concert Hall, Vienna, Austria, H. Groh, vn, G. Hinterndorfer, vn, D. Ivanova, va, R. Flieder, vc

=== Divertimento for Harp and String Quintet (1996) ===
- 18', VM
- Recorded VMM 2034, 2001 Adriana Antalova, hp, Moravian PO String Quintet
- hp + vn (2), va, vc, db

=== Seven Fantasy Pieces for Violin and Piano (1989) ===
- 18', VM
- Premiere: July 19, 1991, Paul Carlson, Vn, Nancy Van de Vate, Pf, Vienna, Austria
- Recording: VMM 2034, 2001, Michael Davis, vn, Nelson Harper, pf

=== Trio for Violin, Cello and Piano (1983) ===
- 13', VM
- Premiere: March 24, 1984, Mexico City, Mexico, Nancy McAlhany, Vn, Maxine Neuman, Vc, Max Lifchitz, Pf.
- Recording: VMM CD 2001, 1990, Janusz Mirynski, Vn, Zdzislaw Lapinski, vc, Marek Mitelski, pf

=== Letter to a Friend's Loneliness (1976) ===
- Texts: John Unterecker
- 10', VM
- Premiere: November 8, 1976, Johnson City, Tennessee, US, Recording: VMM CD 2006, 1992, Sulie Girardi, Mezzo, Bohuslav Martinu Philharmonic String Quartet
- soprano and string quartet

=== Concertpiece for Cello and Piano (1976) ===
- VM

=== Suite for Solo Violin (1975) ===
- 8', Sisra Publications
- Premiere: December 12, 1976, The New School, New York. Recording: VMM CD 2006, 1992, Michael Davis,

=== Suite for Solo Viola (1975) ===
- 8', VM
- Premiere: Nov. 2, 2006, Vienna, Austria, Jan Reznicek
- Recorded: VMM CD 2034, 2001, Kate Hamilton

=== Trio for Strings (1974) ===
- 14', Arsis Press
- Premiere: August 1975, Stowe, Vermont, Recordings: VMM CD 2006, 1992, Bohuslav Martinu Philharmonic String Trio; VMM CD 2026, 1997, Veronika String Trio
- vn, va, vc

=== Six Etudes for Solo Viola (1969) ===
- 9', Arsis Press
- Premiere: December 24, 1974, New York City, Jacob Glick, Recording: VMM CD 2003, 1992, Michael Davis

=== Six Etudes for Solo Violin (1969) ===
- 9', VM
- Premiere: November 12, 1989, Paul Carlson, Pittsburg, Kansas
- Recordings: VMM 2028, 1998, Michael Davis

== Keyboard Instruments ==
=== Twelve Pieces for Piano on One to Twelve Notes, Vol. III (2005) ===
- 16', VM
- Premiere, Vienna, Austria, Ruth Spindler, pf.

=== Balinese Diptych (2003) ===
- 10', VM
- Premiere: Sept. 9, 2003, Ananda Sukarlan, pf. Oslo, Norway. Rec. VMM 2043, 2007. A. Sukarlan.

=== Prelude for Organ (2002) ===
- 4', VM
- Premiere: June 9, 2002: Brad Maguire, Wellesley Mass. Rec. VMM 2043, 2007, Carlyn Morenus

=== Twelve Pieces for Piano on One to Twelve Notes, Vol. II (2001) ===
- 19', VM
- Premiere: August 15, 2001, Kathryn Rosenberg, Provincetown, Mass. Rec. VMM 2039, 2004 Thomas Hlawatsch

=== Fantasy Pieces for Piano (1995) ===
- 10', VM
- Premiere: March 5, 1996, Utrecht, the Netherlands, Ananda Sukarlan; Recording: VMM 2026, 1997, Makiko Hirashima

=== Night Journey (1996) ===
- 8', VM
- Premiere: April 19, 1997, Eisenstadt, Austria, Ruth Spindler. Rec. VMM 2028, 1998, Antoinette van Zabner

=== Twelve Pieces for Piano on One to Twelve Notes, Vol I (1986) ===
- 18', VM
- Premiere: July 19, 1990, Vienna, Austria, Ruth Spindler. Recording: VMM CD 2003, 1992, Ruth Spindler

=== Fantasy for Harpsichord (1982) ===
- 4', VM
- Premiere: May 6, 1983, Ann Arbor, Michigan, Michelle Edwards, Harpsichord; Recording: VMM 2028, 1998, Ewa Gabrys Sonata for Harpsichord, 1982, rev. 1996, 10', VM
- Premiere: November 12, 1983, Davis, California; Recording: VMM 2026, 1997, Ewa Gabrys MUSIC FOR WOODWINDS

=== Sonata for Clarinet and Piano (1970) ===
- 13', VM
- Premiere: Sept. 2005, Vienna, Austria, Ruth Spindler, pf, Katrin Gstöckenbauer, cl.

=== Woodwind Quartet (1964) ===
- 8', Southern Music Co.
- Premiere: Autumn 1964, Interlochen, MI, Interlochen Arts Woodwind Quartet
- fl, ob, cl, bn

== Music for brass ==
=== Trio for Horn, Violin and Piano (2006) ===
- 17', VM
- Premiere: March 8, 2007, Haydnsaal, Vienna, Austria, Ferenc Leitner, hn., Ute Lehmann, vn., Maki Saeki, pf

=== Three Bagatelles for Four Trumpets (2006) ===
- 6' VM

=== Three Bagatelles for Four Horns (2006) ===
- 6' VM
- Premiere: August 5, 2006, Potsdam (Germany) Horn Quartet

=== Brass Quintet No. 2: Variations on "The Streets of Laredo" (2005) ===
- 17' VM
- Premiere: October 9, 2006 Oxford, Miss. (US), The Mississippi Brass; Rec. VMM 2043, 2005, The Mississippi Brass 2 tpt. hn. trb. tuba

=== Diversion for Brass (1964) ===
- 5', VM
- Premiere: November 14, 1964, Atlanta, Georgia, Georgia State University Brass Quartet Rec. VMM 2043, 2007, The Niagara Brass
- 2 tp, hn, trb or euphonium

=== Short Suite for Brass Quartet (1960) ===
- 6', VM
- Premiere: November 9, 1963, Atlanta, Georgia, Georgia State University Brass Quartet
- Recording: VMM 2039, 2005, Niagara Brass
- 2 tp, trb, bass trb

== Music for percussion ==
=== Suite for Marimba (2000) ===
- 10', VM
- Premiere: April 5, 2005, University of Mississippi, Ricky Burkhead

=== Teufelstanz (1988) ===
- 14', VM
- Premiere: February 24, 1989, musica viva, Herculessaal, Münchner Residenz, Munich, Kraków Percussion Ensemble; Recordings: VMM CD 2015, 1995, UNI Percussion Ensemble and VMM CD 2039, 2005, same 6 percussion

== Music for mixed ensemble ==
=== Trio for Horn, Violin, and Piano (2006) ===
- See Music for Brass

=== Trio for Clarinet, Bassoon and Piano (2005) ===
- VM

=== Divertimento for Harp and String Quintet (1996) ===
- 18', VM
- See Music for Strings

=== Music for MW2 (1985) ===
- 13', VM
- Premiere: February 10, 1989, North South Consonance, New York City
- fl, vc, pf-4 Hands, l perc

=== Trio for Bassoon, Percussion and Piano (1980) ===
- 14', VM
- Premiere: December 7, 1980, Honolulu, Hawaii, Paul Barrett, bn, William Wiley, perc, Nancy Van de Vate, pf

=== Music for Viola, Percussion and Piano (1976) ===
- 16', VM
- Premiere: February 27, 1977, Honolulu, Hawaii, Maxine-Karen Johnson, va, William Wiley, perc, Stephen Salazar, pf. Recordings: VMM 2001, 1990, Maxine-Karen Johnson, va, William Wiley, perc, Evelyn Zuckerman, pf and VMM 2039, 2005, Arthur Klima, va, Andrew Pongracz, perc, Eric Zioleck, pf

=== Quintet (1975) ===
- 13', VM
- Premiere: 12.01.1976, Honolulu, Hawaii
- fl, vn, cl, vc, pf

== Choral music ==
=== Cantata for Women's Voices (1979) ===
- Texts: James Joyce, Walt Whitman, Charles Baudelaire, anon. Provençal 12th century BC
- 19', VM
- Premiere: April 1, 1982, Los Angeles, California, Veil of Isis, Joan Gallegos, Cond.
- SSAA, picc, fl, cl, hp, cel, 2 perc

=== An American Essay (1972) ===
- Texts: Walt Whitman
- 30', VM
- Premiere: May 16, 1972, Knoxville Choral Society, Knoxville, Tennessee, J. B. Lyle, Cond. Janice Clarke, Soprano
- SATB, pf, l perc

=== The Pond (1970) ===
- Text: Annette von Droste-Hülsoff, trans. Herman Salinger
- 4'30", VM
- Premiere: 1970, Orlando, Florida. Recording: VMM 3025, 1994, Chorus Soranus, Knud Vad, Cond. and VMM 2039, 2005, Chorus Ars Brunensis, Roman Valek, Cond.
- SATB a cappella

=== How Fares the Night? (1959) ===
- 4', VM
- Premiere: May 29, 1977, Honolulu, Hawaii, Text: anon. 5th century BC, trans. Mimi Tsoi
- SSA, pf

=== Make a Joyful Noise (1972) ===
- 4' (William Huntley, Pseudonym), Text: Psalm 98:4-6
- 4', Montgomery Music Inc.
- SATB, pf or organ

=== Psalm 121 (1958) ===
- 4', VM
- Premiere: June 30, 1974, St. John's Episcopal Choir, Knoxville, Tennessee
- SATB a cappella

== Vocal music ==
=== Listening to the Night (2001) ===
- Text: John Unterecker, VM
- Premiere: March 18, 2003, Michelle Vought, Normal IL (US)
- Soprano and seven instruments (fl., vib., 2 vn, va., vc, db)

=== To the East and to the West (1972) ===
- Text: Walt Whitman
- 3', VM
- Premiere: May 16, 1972, Bettie Mason, soprano, Nancy Van de Vate, piano, Knoxville TN

=== Four Somber Songs (1970) ===
- Texts: Georg Trakl, Edgar Allan Poe, William Blake, Paul Verlaine
- 11', VM
- Premiere: October 21, 1973, Bettie Mason, sop, Nancy Van de Vate, pf, Oak Ridge, TN

=== The Earth is So Lovely (1962) ===
- Text: Heinrich Heine, trans. Kate Flores
- 3', VM
- Premiere: Autumn 1962, Juanita Kirkpatrick, mezzo, Nancy Van de Vate, pf, Oxford, Miss. Rec. VMM 2028, 2005, Evelyn Petros, sop., N. Van de Vate, pf

=== Loneliness (1960) ===
- Text: Rainer Maria Rilke
- 2', VM
- Premiere: 1960, Oxford, Miss, J. Kirkpatrick, mezzo, N. Van de Vate, pf.. Rec. VMM 2028, 2005, Evelyn Petros, sop, N. Van de Vate, pf

== Electronic music ==
=== Invention No. l (Tape) (1972) ===
- 2', VM
- Premiere: May 20, 1973, Knoxville, Tennessee

=== Wind Chimes (Tape) (1972) ===
- 3', VM
- Premiere: May 20, 1973, Knoxville, Tennessee

=== Satellite Music (Tape) (1972) ===
- 6', VM
- Premiere: May 20, 1973, Knoxville, Tennessee

== Music for piano instruction ==
=== Twilight (1963) ===
- Summy Birchard

=== Topsy Turvy (1964) ===
- Helen Huntley, pseudonym
- Montgomery Music Co.

=== Syncopated Soldier (1964) ===
- Helen Huntley, pseudonym
- Montgomery Music Co.

=== Mississippi Twilight (1969) ===
- Helen Huntley, pseudonym
- Montgomery Music Co.

=== Bicycle Ride (1969) ===
- Helen Huntley, pseudonym
- Montgomery Music Co.

=== Hoe-Down (1970) ===
- Helen Huntley, pseudonym
- Willis Music Co.
