= Ting =

Ting may refer to:

== Politics and government ==
- Thing (assembly) or ting, a historical Scandinavian governing assembly
- Ting (administrative unit) (亭), an administrative unit in China during the Qin and Han dynasties
- Ting (廳,厅), an administrative unit (subprefecture) in China during the Qing dynasty

== Products and services ==
- Ting Inc., an internet service provider run by Tucows
- Ting Mobile, a cell phone service provider owned by Tucows
- Ting (drink), a carbonated grapefruit beverage popular in the Caribbean
- ting (alarm), a domestic voltage monitor and alarm

== People ==
- Ding (surname) or Ting, a Chinese surname
- Ting (cartoonist), Merle Tingley (1922–2017), Canadian editorial cartoonist
- Ting Ju ch'ang (1836–1895), Chinese admiral
- Samuel C. C. Ting (born 1936), American physicist
- Ting Tse-Ying, Chinese scholar and associate of the French writer Marcel Schwob

== Other uses ==
- Ding (vessel) or ting, an ancient Chinese cauldron
- Ting, Iran, a village in Sistan and Baluchestan Province of Iran
- Ting River, a river in South China
- Ting, a 1992 album by Nits

== See also ==
- The Ting Tings, a British rock duo
- Ding (disambiguation)
- Thing (disambiguation)
- Tyng (surname)
