= Miegel =

Surname

Miegel is a surname. Notable people with the name include:

- Agnes Miegel (1879-1964), German author, journalist and poet
- Meinhard Miegel (born 1939), German political scientist
