= You Must Change Your Life =

Book by Peter Sloterdijk

- Author: Peter Sloterdijk
- Original title: Du mußt dein Leben ändern
- Language: German
- Subject: philosophy of practice
- Publisher: Suhrkamp Verlag
- Publication date: 2009
- Publication place: Germany
- English publication date: 2013
- Media type: Print
- Pages: 723
- ISBN: 978-3-518-41995-3

You Must Change Your Life (German: Du mußt dein Leben ändern. Über Anthropotechnik) is a 2009 book by the German philosopher Peter Sloterdijk about the history and philosophy of practice across the planet as well as the development of anthropotechnics.

== Summary ==
Sloterdijk uses "anthropotechnics" to refer to "techniques of individual and collective self-transformation" with a lens that sees "human life not in terms of a struggle between those who wield power and those who are subject to it (he dismisses this version of history as leftist kitsch), but in terms of the networks of 'discipline' through which we live our lives and construct our world". The book's title comes from the final line of Rainer Maria Rilke's poem "Archaic Torso of Apollo". Sloterdijk describes it as the "absolute imperative—the quintessential metanoetic command".

== Reception ==
Originally published in German by Suhrkamp Verlag in 2009, the book was translated into English in 2013. Keith Ansell-Pearson received this work as "a tour de force that engages the history of philosophy, religion, and thought, both Western and Eastern, in ways that make you think deeply about the evolution of the human being these past few thousand years. As if this weren’t already enough, Sloterdijk is also concerned with the future, and on a planetary scale. Where are we heading? Where do we wish to go? More to the point, where must we go? How must we change our lives?"
