= Der Zauberbaum =

1985 novel by Peter Sloterdijk

- Author: Peter Sloterdijk
- Language: German
- Publisher: Suhrkamp Verlag
- Publication date: 1985
- Publication place: West Germany
- Pages: 322
- ISBN: 3518032216

Der Zauberbaum (lit. 'The Magic Tree') is a 1985 novel by the German philosopher Peter Sloterdijk. It is about a young Austrian physician, Jan van Leyden, who becomes a disciple of the Marquis de Puységur.

Sloterdijk has said Der Zauberbaum is one of the most difficult books he has written, because it was his first novel and forced him to "conquer a freedom" he previously did not think was possible. Although it is a historical novel set in the 18th century, he describes it as a "translated autobiography" that closely follows his life from 1975 to 1985, which was a time characterised by self-discovery and included a trip to India where he lived for several months in a guru's community.

The book was published in the wake of Sloterdijk's breakthrough as a public intellectual with the 1983 book Critique of Cynical Reason, to which it ties in thematically. Der Zauberbaum is critical of psychoanalysis and its reliance on a Cartesian view of science and the subject. The scholar Till R. Kuhnle describes it as a Bildungsroman which expresses positions that approach Lebensphilosophie.
