= Harriet Morgan Tyng =

American poet

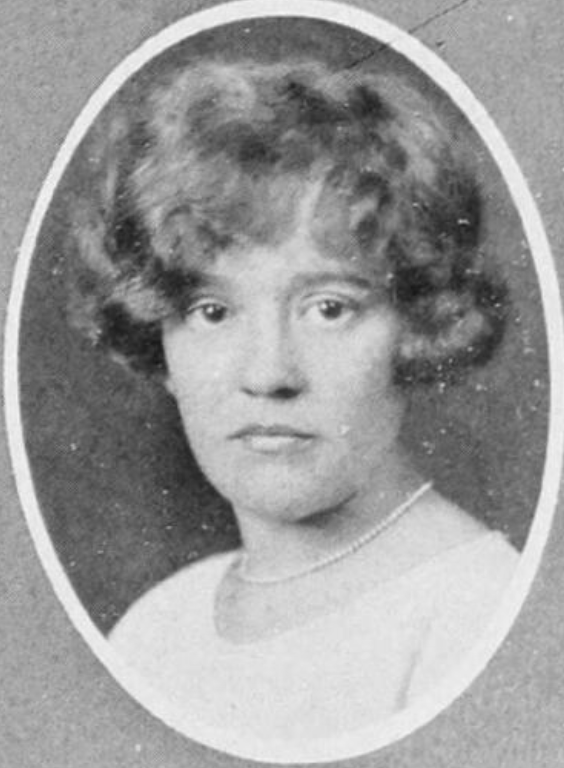
- Harriet Morgan Tyng, from the 1928 yearbook of Barnard College
- Born: May 17, 1905; Cranford, New Jersey, U.S.
- Died: October 31, 1952 (aged 47); St. Johnsbury, Vermont, U.S.
- Occupations: Poet, educator, school administrator
- Relatives: Stephen H. Tyng (great-grandfather)

Harriet Morgan Tyng (May 17, 1905 – October 31, 1952) was an American poet and educator. She was the first director of the Willard Day School in Troy, New York, from 1946 to 1952.

== Early life and education ==
Tyng was born in Cranford, New Jersey, the daughter of Francis William Edmonds Tyng Sr. and Margreta Hyde Tyng. Her great-grandfather was Stephen H. Tyng, a noted Episcopal clergyman in New York City. Her older brother Francis Edmonds Tyng Jr. was also a writer and editor. She graduated from Barnard College in 1928, with further studies at Columbia University and Bryn Mawr College.

== Career ==
Tyng was a teacher at private schools in New Jersey, Pennsylvania, and Massachusetts. From 1946 to her death in 1952, she was the first director of the Willard Day School in Troy, New York, where she also taught music and French. During her tenure, Willard Day School became co-educational, and added a pre-kindergarten class. "She was an imaginative and sensitive teacher, sympathetically interested in all her students, both boys and girls," according to a 1953 obituary. She established a practice of "new faculty seminars", where Willard teachers gave talks about their area of expertise for a gathering of their colleagues.

== Publications ==
In addition to her school work, Tyng published two volumes of poetry (with a third appearing posthumously, to raise funds for a Harriet Morgan Tyng scholarship fund). "If Miss Tyng seems most frequently to ride her muse on inconsequential journeying," commented a reviewer in 1947, "what she has to say is consistently pleasant and occasionally wisely observant."

- Open Letter and Other Poems (1938)
- Vermont Village (1947)
- "The Whole of Vermont" (1948)
- "Childhood" (1949)
- "Not Here" (1949)
- "The Chapel" (1950)
- "Ice Storm" (1950)
- Later Poems (1954, published posthumously)

== Personal life and legacy ==
She took a leave of absence from Willard Day School in 1951, for health reasons, and she died in 1952, at the age of 47, in St. Johnsbury, Vermont. The Vermont Historical Society holds a small collection of her papers, including correspondence, journals, clippings, rejection letters, and manuscripts of unpublished works. Composer Clara Lyle Boone (Lyle de Bohun), who was a member of the Friends of Willard Day School, was inspired by Tyng to write her "Motive and Chorale for Chamber Orchestra", saying "Although we never met, her educational concepts deeply impressed me, and her dedicated life was the major stimulus for the creation of the piece."
