= Elizabeth R. Austin =

American composer (born 1938)

Elizabeth R. Austin (born 1938) is an American composer.

== Life ==
Born in Baltimore, Elizabeth R. Austin received her early musical training at The Peabody Conservatory. When Nadia Boulanger visited Goucher College (Towson, MD), she awarded the composer a scholarship to study at the Conservatoire Americaine in Fontainebleau, France, after hearing Austin's song cycle Drei Rilke Lieder.

Her association with the Hartt School of Music (University of Hartford), where she earned a Master's in Music while on the faculty, included the establishment of a faculty/student exchange with the Staatliche Hochschule für Musik, Heidelberg-Mannheim. While studying for her Ph.D. at The University of Connecticut, Elizabeth Austin won First Prize in the Lipscomb Electronic Music Competition (with her Klavier Double for piano and tape).

Her awards have included a Connecticut Commission on the Arts grant, selection by GEDOK (Society of Women Artists in Germany/Austria) to represent the Mannheim region in its 70th anniversary exhibition, and First Prize in IAWM's 1998 Miriam Gideon Competition (for Homage for Hildegard von Bingen, and a Rockefeller Foundation residency at Bellagio, Italy (2001).

Performed in Europe and Scandinavia, as well as in The United States and the Caribbean Austin's music has been received with distinction and critical acclaim. Featured on Germany's Mitteldeutscher Rundfunk, the Leipzig pianist Ulrich Urban has championed her piano music, performing at the Gewandhaus and The National Gallery of Art.

Dr. Michael K. Slayton, Professor of Theory/Composition, Blair School of Music, Vanderbilt University, wrote his DMA dissertation (University of Houston, 2000) on Austin's music. Dr. Teresa Crane, U. Illinois, wrote a DMA dissertation on Austin's song cycles (2007).

In several IAWM Journals (2001-2014), her music has been the subject of interviews and articles. The online journal SCOPE (Winter, 2011) has a feature article on her music.

Dr. Austin was the BMI/Vanderbilt University Composer in Residence in 2015. An excerpt from her full length opera That I am One and Double Too, (2009) was performed in a portrait concert. The final scene was also performed in 2018 through The Women Composers Festival of Hartford. In honor of their 125th anniversary in 2015, the Hartford Musical Club awarded her a commission, premiered in an Austin portrait concert. In 2017, Austin's Litauische Lieder was performed in Berlin.

Austin's music is published by Arsis Press, Tonger Musikverlag, Peer Musik, Certosa and recorded on the Parma (Capstone) and Leonarda labels as well as on the 1994 Society of Composers CD and Journal (Vol. 20). Her scores are available through the American Composers Alliance.

== Honors and awards ==
- First Prize, David Lipscomb Electronic Music Competition for Klavier Double (1983)
- First Prize, IAWM's Miriam Gideon Composition Competition for A Hommage for Hildegard (1998)
- Selected by GEDOK (Society of Women Artists in German-speaking countries) to represent Mannheim-Ludwigshafen in the Lubeck seventieth-year anniversary exhibition (Spring, 1996)
- GEDOK retrospective concert in Mannheim, June 1998

== Works ==
Selected works include:

- Drei Rilke Lieder for middle voice and piano (1958)
- Zodiac Suite for piano (1983, revised 1993)
- Klavier Double for piano and tape (1983)
- Wilderness (Symphony No.1) (1987)
- Sonnets from the Portuguese, song cycle (1988)
- To Begin for brass quintet (1990)
- Lighthouse (Symphony No.2) (1993)
- Water Music I: Beside still waters... for cello octet (1996)
- Homage for Hildegard for mezzo soprano, baritone, flute, clarinet, percussion, and piano (1997)
- A Woman's Love and Life, song cycle (1999) setting Adelbert von Chamisso
- An American Triptych for piano (2001)
- Rose Sonata for piano (2002)
- When the Song of the Angels is Stilled for SATB chorus a cappella (2005)
- B-A-C-Homage for viola and piano (2007)
- I Felt a Funeral in My Brain for carillon (2007)
- A Celebration Concerto for wind ensemble and child soprano (2007)
- Puzzle Preludes for piano (1994-2008)
- Psalm 22 for SATB chorus, a cappella (2009)
- That I am One and Double Too, opera (2009) (based on Kleist's The Marquise of O)

Her music has been recorded and issued on CD, including:

- Society of Composers, Inc.: Songfest (1995)
- Window Panes, Navona NV6304 (2020)
