= Infinite Mobilization =

1989 book by Peter Sloterdijk

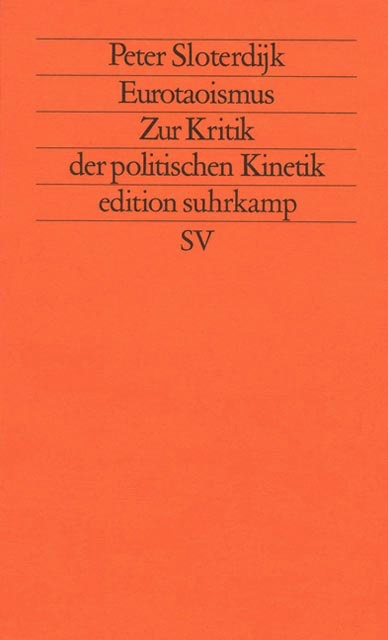
- First edition
- Author: Peter Sloterdijk
- Original title: Eurotaoismus. Zur Kritik der politischen Kinetik
- Translator: Sandra Berjan
- Language: German
- Publisher: Suhrkamp Verlag
- Publication date: 19 January 1989
- Publication place: Germany
- English publication date: April 2020
- Pages: 346
- ISBN: 978-3-518-11450-6

Infinite Mobilization (German: Eurotaoismus. Zur Kritik der politischen Kinetik, lit. 'Eurotaoism: toward a critique of political kinetics') is a 1989 book by the German philosopher Peter Sloterdijk. It critiques modernity as a conception of kinetics that inevitably leads to disappointment, and promotes a view of life as a series of beginnings.

== Summary ==
Peter Sloterdijk argues that modernity as a project is based on a conception of kinetics where the world is controlled by humans who move it toward a future utopia. This continuously leads to disappointment, as the utopian human actions set unexpected things in motion and create side-effects outside the control of reason. The disappointment creates a new self-understanding where humans view themselves as self-destructive. From this premise, Sloterdijk critiques the modern project as "political kinetics".

Sloterdijk characterises the modern project as an aggressive quest for movement for movement's own sake, and employs what he describes as the Freiburg School of critical theory, associated with Edmund Husserl and Martin Heidegger, arguing against the very existence of a Frankfurt critical theory. Dismissing explanations of modernity based on negative concepts such as guilt, lack and scarcity, Sloterdijk promotes the view of life as a series of beginnings, drawing on Friedrich Nietzsche and on Hannah Arendt's notion of natality. Sloterdijk ends the book by saying that a "real critical theory, should it exist one day, will be identical to authentic mysticism".

== Publication ==
Infinite Mobilization was first published in German by Suhrkamp Verlag on 19 January 1989. Its German title is Eurotaoismus. Zur Kritik der politischen Kinetik, which means 'Eurotaoism: toward a critique of political kinetics'. Commenting on the German title, Sloterdijk says the word Eurotaoism can be understood as a joke, as a comment on an "Americataoism" that responds to Western crises by importing food and lifestyle trends from Asia, and as "a critique of planetary mobilization as the false permanent revolution". Polity published Sandra Berjan's English translation as Infinite Mobilization in April 2020.

== Reception ==
In Die Tageszeitung, Mathias Bröckers wrote that Sloterdijk's writing style appears lighthearted but the subject in Infinite Mobilization is heavy. Bröckers wrote that a critique of kinetics is a critique of the actions and self-image that for long have characterised the West and Germany. He made a distinction between the book's call for awareness about human finitude and calls for religiosity and irrationality. Reviewing the English translation for the philosophy journal Cosmos and History, J. Daniel Andersson wrote that "yet another immanent critique of modernity" may seem irrelevant in the 21st century, but the book is timely because it ties in with current discussions about the Anthropocene and historiology, and can be read alongside Dipesh Chakrabarty's critique of the separation of human and natural sciences. Andersson summarised Infinite Mobilization as "a marriage between the total mobilization of Ernst Jünger and the dromology of Paul Virilio, interspersed with the risk society of Ulrich Beck and Martin Heidegger's interpretation of the will to power as the self-recapitulation of the identical".
