= Making the Heavens Speak =

2020 book by Peter Sloterdijk

- First edition
- Author: Peter Sloterdijk
- Original title: Den Himmel zum Sprechen bringen
- Translator: Robert Hughes
- Language: German
- Publisher: Suhrkamp Verlag
- Publication date: 26 October 2020
- Publication place: Germany
- English publication date: December 2022
- Pages: 352
- ISBN: 978-3-518-42933-4

Making the Heavens Speak: Religion as Poetry (German: Den Himmel zum Sprechen bringen. Über Theopoesie, lit. 'Making the Heavens Speak. On Theopoetics') is a 2020 book by the German philosopher Peter Sloterdijk.

== Summary ==
The book analyzes religions from a perspective where they are viewed as literary products. Rejecting anti-religious positions such as that of Karl Marx, it examines the genre's stylistic devices, or "theopoetics". Among the subjects it covers are the theatre of ancient Greece, the anti-mythological stance of Plato, ancient Egyptian polytheism, the theologian Karl Barth, Heinrich Joseph Dominicus Denzinger's Enchiridion Symbolorum, the universal claims of Islam, and the Book of Job.

== Publication ==
Suhrkamp Verlag published the book in Germany on 26 October 2020. An English translation by Robert Hughes was published by Polity in December 2022.

== Reception ==
Stephan Sattler of Focus placed the book in a group of recent German books about the origins and history of "human understanding of the self and the world", written by Hans Joas, Jan Assmann and Jürgen Habermas, which all draw from the latest decades of philological, historical and sociological research. Sattler wrote that each of Sloterdijk's chapters can be read as a standalone essay, and that "this disturbing book should not be missed".
