= Elizabeth Walton Vercoe =

American musician and composer

- Born: April 23, 1941 (age 85); Washington, D.C., United States
- Occupations: Musician, music educator, composer
- Instruments: Piano, clarinet, violin
- Labels: Owl, Capstone, Leonarda, Centaur, Navona

Elizabeth Vercoe (born April 23, 1941) is an American musician, music educator and composer.

== Biography ==
Born in Washington, D.C., Elizabeth Vercoe grew up in a musical family and studied the classical piano and the violin while attending the National Cathedral School. From 1958 to 1962, she studied music theory at Wellesley College where she was awarded the Hubert Weldon Lamb Prize in Composition. Following college, Vercoe began graduate school at the University of Michigan where she pursued a Masters of Music degree in composition, studying under George Wilson, Ross Lee Finney and Leslie Bassett. In 1974, Vercoe entered the doctoral program in music composition at Boston University where she was mentored by the composer, Gardner Read and was awarded First Prize in Music Theory and Composition and was elected to Pi Kappa Lambda, the national music honor society.

Her teaching posts have included a position in music theory on the faculty at Westminster Choir College in Princeton, New Jersey, a year at Framingham State College in Massachusetts, and her current job since 1997 as an adjunct professor at Regis College.

Vercoe has won a number of national and international composition competitions and received grants from the National Endowment for the Arts, Meet the Composer, and the Massachusetts Arts Council. She has also received fellowships from the Cité internationale des arts in Paris, from 1983 to 1985 for three separate residencies in France, and she has also been a Fellow at the MacDowell Colony, the Charles Ives Center for American Music, the Virginia Center for the Creative Arts, and the Civitella Ranieri Foundation in Italy. In 2003 Elizabeth Vercoe was awarded the Acuff Chair of Excellence at Austin Peay State University for a semester residency in which she gave public lectures, coached performances of her music, and was commissioned to write new work.

Notable performances include those by the Memphis Chamber Orchestra, the Pro Arte Chamber Orchestra, the Berkshire Symphony Orchestra, the Women's Philharmonic, the Aeolian Chamber Players, the New York Virtuoso Singers, Alea III, and the Great Noise Ensemble, and at such venues as the Amalfi Coast Festival, the Goethe Institute in Bangkok, the Marblehead Festival, the Svenska Mandolinfestivalen, Carnegie Recital Hall, the Salle Cortot, IRCAM, the Piccolo Spoleto Festival, Abraham Goodman House and Merkin Hall. In 2014 her Elegy for viola and piano was performed in Bruno Walter Hall at Lincoln Center on the 75th Anniversary Concert of the American Music Center.

Her recorded music is issued on the Owl, Capstone, Leonarda, Centaur and Navona labels, and she is published by Arsis Press, Noteworthy Sheet Music, and Certosa Verlag.

== Works ==
Selected works include:

- A Dangerous Man (staged monodrama for baritone and piano), 1990
- A la fin-tout seul (for mandolin and optional piano), 1985, Plucked String Editions
- American Fancy (for two pianos), 2000
- Balance (for violin and cello), 1974, Arsis Press
- Butterfly Effects (for flute and harp), 2008-9, Noteworthy Sheet Music
- Butterfly Effects (arranged for oboe and harp) 2010, Certosa Verlag
- Changes: A Little Music for Mozart (for chamber orchestra), 1991
- Despite our differences #1 (for violin, cello and piano), 1984
- Despite our differences #2 (for piano and chamber orchestra), 1988
- Eight Riddles from Symphosius (for contralto & piano), 1964
- Elegy (for viola and piano), 1989
- Fantasy (for piano), 1975, Arsis Press
- Fantavia (for flute and percussion), 1982, Noteworthy Sheet Music
- Four Humors (for clarinet and piano), 1992
- Five Inventions (for horn and piano), 2005
- Five True Remarkable Occurrences (for mezzo & guitar), 2008
- God Be in My Head (for women’s or mixed chorus & keyboard), 1995, Arsis Press
- Herstory I (for soprano, piano & vibraphone), 1975
- Herstory II: 13 Japanese Lyrics (for soprano, piano & percussion), 1979, Arsis Press
- Herstory III: Jehanne de Lorraine (for mezzo or soprano & piano), 1986, Arsis Press
- Herstory IV (for mezzo or soprano & mandolin or marimba), 1997
- In the Storm (for mezzo-soprano, clarinet & piano), 1989
- Irreveries from Sappho (for mezzo or soprano & piano), 1981, Arsis Press
- Irreveries from Sappho (for SSA chorus & piano), 1985, Arsis Press
- Irreveries from Sappho (duet for soprano, mezzo-soprano & piano), 1985[?]
- Kleemation (for flute and piano), 2003, Noteworthy Sheet Music
- Nine Epigrams from Poor Richard (for voice & tape), 1986
- Rhapsody (for violin and orchestra), 1977
- Sonaria (for solo cello), 1980, Arsis Press
- Supplication (for piano), 1994, League ISCM Boston, Piano Book
- To Music (for solo flute), 2003, Noteworthy Sheet Music
- This is my letter to the World (for voice, flute & piano), 2001
- Umbrian Suite (for 4 hands or 2 pianos), 1999, Certosa Verlag
- Varieties of Amorous Experience (for soprano & piano), 1994

== Selected discography ==
Butterfly Effects, Navona Records, November 9, 2018. Includes "Butterfly Effects", "This is My Letter to the World", "Elegy", and "Herstory I".

Kleemation, Navona Records, October 30, 2012. Includes "Fantasy", "Irreveries from Sappho", "Herstory II: Thirteen Japanese Lyrics", "To Music", and "Despite our differences #1".
