= Das Schelling-Projekt =

2016 novel by Peter Sloterdijk

- Author: Peter Sloterdijk
- Language: German
- Publisher: Suhrkamp Verlag
- Publication date: 12 September 2016
- Publication place: Germany
- Pages: 251
- ISBN: 978-3-518-74515-1

Das Schelling-Projekt (lit. 'The Schelling Project') is a 2016 novel by the German writer Peter Sloterdijk.

== Plot ==
The book is an erotic satire set within academia. A group of five ageing scholars get their application for a research grant rejected, despite their effort to create a project title with references to philosophy, science and female biology. The novel consists of a series of letters written after the rejection and a report of a working session on the subject of female sexuality and German idealism.

== Reception ==
Arno Orzessek of Deutschlandfunk Kultur called the book a "farce" that in parts is "pornographic and trashy" and invites Sloterdijk's critics, such as Jürgen Habermas, to see in it "a mental confession, a filthy revelling in an old man's unkempt horniness and sweaty jokes".
