= Clara Lyle Boone =

American composer

- Clara Lyle Boone, from the 1948 yearbook of Centre College
- Born: September 6, 1927; Stanton, Kentucky
- Died: June 21, 2015; Washington, D.C.
- Other names: Lyle de Bohun
- Occupation(s): Composer, educator, publisher, politician

Clara Lyle Boone (September 6, 1927 – June 21, 2015) was an American composer and founder of Arsis Press, which specialized in publishing works by contemporary women composers. She also taught music, and ran for a Congressional seat.

== Early life and education ==
Boone was born in Stanton, Kentucky, the daughter of Jouett Shelby Boone and Deborah Davida Johnson Boone. Her father was a banker, and her mother was a singer. (Daniel Boone was the brother of one of her Boone ancestors; her younger brother was named for this forebearer.) She graduated from Centre College in Danville, Kentucky in 1948. She studied composition with Walter Piston and Darius Milhaud.

== Career ==
Trained as a music teacher, Boone taught at schools in Kentucky, Michigan, and New York. Beginning in 1957, she taught at the National Cathedral School for Girls in Washington, D.C. In 1967, she began teaching fifth graders at Payne Elementary School, a public school in the city. She retired from school work in 1977, but continued to live in the neighborhood of Payne Elementary.

Boone was office manager of the Campbell County Civic Association in 1951. She lobbied for arts funding and equal opportunities in the arts, and worked on the library staff of the Democratic National Committee. Despite her Washington, D.C. address, she campaigned for the Democratic nomination for a Congressional seat in Kentucky in 1962, saying "I believe Civil Rights should be rooted in principle rather than in politics, and I believe a principle deserves not its name unless it is practiced every day and everywhere".

Boone founded Arsis Press in 1974, to publish works by contemporary women composers. The Arsis Press catalog came to include such composers as Vivian Fine, Ruth Crawford Seeger, Emma Lou Diemer, Harriet Bolz, Elizabeth R. Austin, Nancy Van de Vate, Gwyneth Walker, Ingrid Stölzel, Vally Weigl, Ruth Schönthal, Mary Jeanne van Appledorn, Clare Shore, Elizabeth Walton Vercoe, Judith Shatin, Alexandra Pierce, and Ruth Lomon. "In my time, it was believed that women did not write music, and if they did it wouldn't be music that anyone would listen to," she said in a 1997 interview in The Washington Post. She was a member of the International League of Women Composers (now known as the International Alliance of Women in Music, or IAWM).

== Compositions ==
Boone composed and published some works under the name "Lyle de Bohun", hoping to evade gender discrimination. In addition to these listed works, Boone published twelve songs, including a setting of a Shakespeare sonnet, and another based on lyrics by Gwen Frostic.

- The Americas, a trio for flute, clarinet and bassoon
- Songs of Estrangement for string quartet and soprano
- Motive and Chorale for chamber orchestra, dedicated to educator Harriet Morgan Tyng

== Personal life ==
Boone lived in Washington, D.C. for much of her adult life, and was known to ride her bikes around the city on errands, into her seventies. She was once shot in the leg, during a mugging. She died in 2015, at the age of 77. Her records of the Arsis Press are held by the Library of Congress.
