= Rage and Time =

2006 book by Peter Sloterdijk

Rage and Time: A Psychopolitical Investigation
- Cover of the first edition
- Author: Peter Sloterdijk
- Original title: Zorn und Zeit. Politisch-psychologischer Versuch
- Translator: Mario Wenning
- Language: German
- Publisher: Suhrkamp Verlag
- Publication date: September 2006
- Publication place: Germany
- English publication date: April 2010
- Pages: 356
- ISBN: 978-3-518-45990-4

Rage and Time: A Psychopolitical Investigation (German: Zorn und Zeit. Politisch-psychologischer Versuch) is a 2006 book by the German philosopher Peter Sloterdijk. It traces the role and prevalence of rage in Western history, starting with the Thumos described by Homer in the Iliad. Sloterdijk argues that a productive form of rage has been suppressed by first Christianity and then psychoanalysis.

An English translation by Mario Wenning was published in 2010.

== Contents ==
- Rage transactions
- The wrathful god: the discovery of the metaphysical revenge bank
- The rage revolution: on the communist world bank of rage
- The dispersion of rage in the era of the center
- Conclusion: beyond resentment

== Reception ==
Julia Encke of the Frankfurter Allgemeine Zeitung described Sloterdijk as a "democratically thinking Nietzsche reader" due to his search for a rage free from ressentiment, stating that the book was "a first step" toward such a thing. Publishers Weekly called the book "a brilliant and conceptually rich analysis of the influence of rage on the development of Western culture". The critic continued: "Though frequently hampered by excessive academic jargon and a theoretically questionable oscillation between the non-equivalent notions of Thymos and rage, the book offers a fascinating account of the historical dynamics of social development".

The French translation of the book received the Prix européen de l'essai Charles Veillon in 2008.
