= Harriet Bolz =

American composer

- Harriet Bolz, from a 1969 newspaper
- Born: Harriet Seymour Hallock; November 24, 1909; Columbus, Ohio
- Died: March 9, 1995 (aged 87); Columbus, Ohio
- Other names: Harriett Bolz, Harriett Hallock Bolz
- Occupation: Composer

Harriet Seymour Hallock Bolz (November 24, 1909 – March 9, 1995) was an American composer based in Ohio.

== Early life and education ==
Harriet Seymour Hallock was born in Columbus, Ohio, the daughter of Roscoe Scott Hallock and Anna Druzilla Griffith Hallock. Both of her parents were also born in Ohio. Her father was a physician. She graduated from the Cleveland Institute of Music, and earned a bachelor's degree from Case Western Reserve University. She completed a master's degree in composition at Ohio State University. She studied with Paul Creston and Leo Sowerby.

== Career ==
Bolz composed secular and church music. In 1974 her Sweet Jesus was awarded first prize in a choral competition sponsored by the National League of American Pen Women. She was active in the Ohio Federation of Music Clubs. In 1965 she was recognized by the National Federation of Music Clubs (NFMC) as winner of an adult non-professional composition competition. A piano quartet by Bolz had its premiere performance at an NFMC convention in 1983.

Bolz's work is mostly performed on programs of music by women composers, including a 1969 concert of works by Ohio women, and a 1986 harp recital at the University of Iowa. After a 1985 concert at Georgia State University, a reviewer described her Floret, a short piece for piano, as "witty, brilliantly pianistic." She attended a 1992 concert at the Lancaster Festival composers' symposium, saying "I'm always happy to have things performed. That's how you learn."

Since her death, works by Bolz continue to appear on concert programs, including a 1997 program at George Washington University; a 2004 concert in Fort Lauderdale; and a 2015 workshop by the Chamber Musicians of Northern California.

== Compositions ==
Many of Bolz's works were published by Hildegard Publishing, Arsis Press, Sam Fox Publishing, Choral Arts Publications, Beckenhorst Press, and Harold Branch Publishing.

- Floret: A Mood Caprice for Piano
- Two Profiles for Piano
- "Cradle Song" (1943, a setting for a William Blake poem)
- Carol of the Flowers (1967, for choir)
- Pageant Prelude (1969)
- Lyric Designs for Orchestra (1970s)
- Capitol Pageant for Piano Duet
- Narrative Impromptu for Harp
- Repartee Rhapsodic (for flute and harp)
- Polychrome Patterns (1984, a sonatina for clarinet and piano)
- Episode for Organ: Autumn Joy
- Episode Prismatic for Alto Saxophone, Tenor Saxophone and Piano
- Sonic Essay and Fugue for Organ (1981)
- Festive Fantasia (1995, for clarinet, bassoon, and French horn)
- How Shall We Speak?
- Sweet Jesus
- Ricochet
- Such Be the Thought

== Personal life ==
In 1937, Hallock married Harold August Bolz, an engineering professor at Ohio State University. They had three sons, William, Everett, and Eric. She died in 1995, at the age of 85, in Columbus.
