= Janet Lembke =

American author and translator (1933–2013)

- Born: Janet Nutt; March 2, 1933; Cleveland, Ohio, U.S.
- Died: September 3, 2013 (aged 80)
- Education: Middlebury College
- Occupations: Author; essayist; naturalist; translator; scholar

Janet Lembke (2 March 1933 – 3 September 2013), née Janet Nutt, was an American author, essayist, naturalist, translator and scholar.

== Life and work ==
Lembke was born in Cleveland, Ohio during the Great Depression, graduated in 1953 from Middlebury College, Vermont, with a degree in Classics, and her knowledge of the classical Greek and Latin worldview, from Homer to Virgil, informed her life and work. A Certified Virginia Master Gardener, she lived in Virginia and North Carolina, drawing inspiration from both locales. She was recognized for her creative view of natural cycles, agriculture and of animals, both domestic and wild, with whom we share the natural environment. Referred to as an "acclaimed Southern naturalist," she was equally (as the Chicago Tribune described her) a "classicist, a noted Oxford University Press translator of the works of Sophocles, Euripides and Aeschylus". She received a grant from the National Endowment for the Arts to translate Virgil's Georgics, having already translated Euripides' Electra and Hecuba, and Aeschylus's Persians and Suppliants.

Lembke's first book was Bronze and Iron: Old Latin Poetry from Its Beginnings to 100 B.C. (1973), but beyond translations and essays about classics, there were more than a dozen books on nature, works for which the author acquired a base of admirers. Her articles were printed in The New York Times, Sierra Magazine (The Sierra Club), Oxford American, Audubon, Raleigh News and Observer, Southern Review and other publications. The writing style was eclectic and personal, meditative and detailed, and though she was at least once accused of "taking poetic license too far" in her translation of Georgics, readers were often charmed and seduced by her way of weaving scientific fact, history and culture, with personal anecdote, mythological allusion and poetic feeling. "The author's ability to pull together disparate elements in her writing is impressive, and her passionate connection with the natural world is displayed in line after line," wrote The New York Times. Novelist Annie Proulx expressed a similar perception, observing that "Lembke's writing tacks between three points: the stuff of her late-twentieth-century life; the tangle of creature and plant in every dimension of tide and river flow; and the haunting, connecting wires of mythos that still knot us to the ancient beginnings."

Among Lembke's noted titles were Because the Cat Purrs: How We Relate to Other Species and Why It Matters (2008); Skinny Dipping: And Other Immersions in Water, Myth, and Being Human (2004); Dangerous Birds (1996); River Time (1997); Despicable Species: On Cowbirds, Kudzu, Hornworms, and Other Scourges (1999); and The Quality of Life: Living Well, Dying Well (2004)-- a sober and unflinching account of the death of the author's mother. At the time of her own death at age 80 in Staunton, Virginia, Lembke was working on a memoir, I Married an Arsonist. She had married twice, and had four children and six grandchildren.

There is a repository of archived materials ("The Janet Lembke Papers, 1966 - 2008"), including notes and correspondence by the author, at the Jackson Library of the University of North Carolina in Greensboro, NC.

== Books ==
Translations

- Suppliants by Aeschylus, Lembke (Translator), Oxford University Press, 1975 - ISBN 0195019334
- Hecuba by Euripides, Lembke (Translator), Oxford University Press, 1991 - ISBN 0195042514
- Persians by Aeschylus - Lembke (Translator), C. John Herington (Translator), Oxford University Press, 1991 - ISBN 0195373375
- Georgics by Virgil, Lembke (Translator), Yale University Press 2006 - ISBN 0300119860

Non-fiction

- Bronze and iron: Old Latin poetry from its beginnings to 100 B.C., University of California Press, 1973 - ISBN 0520021649
- River Time, The Lyons Press, 1989 - ISBN 155821657X
- Looking for Eagles, The Lyons Press 1990 - ISBN 1558210776
- Dangerous Birds, The Lyons Press, 1992 - ISBN 155821514X
- Skinny Dipping: And Other Immersions in Water, Myth, and Being Human, University of Virginia Press, 1994 - ISBN 0813922852
- Shake Them 'Simmons Down, Lyons Press 1996 - ISBN 1558213503
- Despicable Species: On Cowbirds, Kudzu, Hornworms, and Other Scourges, Lyons Press, 1999 - ISBN 1558216359
- Soup's On!: Sixty Hearty Soups You Can Stand Your Spoon In, The Lyons Press, 2001 - ISBN 1585744115
- Touching Earth: Reflections on the Restorative Power of Gardening, Burford Books, 2001 - ISBN 1580800882
- The Quality of Life: Living Well, Dying Well, The Lyons Press, 2004 - ISBN 1592281281
- From Grass to Gardens: How to Reap Bounty from a Small Yard, The Lyons Press, 2006 - ISBN 1592287468
- Because the Cat Purrs: How We Relate to Other Species and Why it Matters, Skyhorse Publishing, 2008 - ISBN 1602392358
- Chickens: Their Natural and Unnatural Histories, Skyhorse Publishing, 2012 - ISBN 162087055X

As co-author

- Southern Harvest, by Claire Leighton; foreword by Lembke, University of Georgia Press, 1997 - ISBN 0820319481
- Tuscan Trees, photographs by Mark Steinmetz, text by Lembke, The Jargon Society, 2002 - ISBN 091233083X
