= Ting (alarm) =

Home voltage monitor and app

Ting (stylized "ting") is a proactive domestic voltage monitor, alarm, and app. The 4 inches (10 cm) tall 2.5 inches (6.4 cm) 2.5 oblong off-white device monitors the home's electrical system for micro-arcs (or scintillations) 30 million times per second for the cumulative precursor events of an electrical house fire.

One week of monitoring provides a baseline for any given household. An Internet of Things (IOT) device plugged into any three-pronged (preferably seldom used) electrical outlet uploads the consumer's data to its manufacturer, Whisker Labs. En toto the nationwide fleet of sensors installed in more than 700,000 homes generates approximately 30 GB of data per second.

Whisker Labs (founded in 2014 and based in Germantown, Maryland) claims to have detected electrical fire faults in 1 of 150 homes without any false positives. Water and fire hazards combined have been detected on average in 1 of 60 homes annually, and overall 80% (approximately four in five) of electrical fires in its network have been prevented. Prevention being cheaper than replacement, Ting has been offered for free to more than two million policy holders by a large cohort of the U.S. insurance industry, including but not limited to State Farm (albeit not in Alaska, Delaware, North Carolina, South Dakota, and Wyoming), Westfield Insurance, Ohio Mutual, reinsurer PURE Insurance (albeit not in Idaho, Maine, Mississippi, North Dakota, Oklahoma, Rhode Island, Virginia, Wisconsin, and Wyoming), Nationwide Insurance, Philadelphia Contributionship, HSB, Farm Insurance Bureau of Michigan, Liberty Mutual, and Erie Insurance.

The service, by means of machine learning analysis of big data from over a million sensors (over 650,000 home years of monitoring data) has detected patterns heretofore not apparent amongst varying electrical codes, the decade of and type of wiring, etc. Approximately 60% of hazards detected stemmed from faulty (degraded) wiring, and 40% from appliances. One unexpected new danger, flagged in 2024, were rotating Christmas trees.

== See also ==
- Whisker Labs
