= Stephen H. Tyng =

Episcopal clergy

The Reverend Stephen H. Tyng D.D.
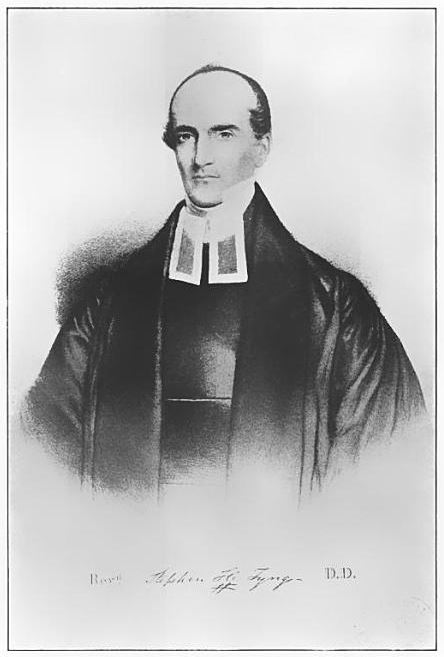
- Born: March 1, 1800; Newburyport, Massachusetts, United States
- Died: September 5, 1885 (aged 85); Irvington-on-Hudson, New York, United States
- Occupation: Clergy
- Known for: Episcopal Church evangelical preacher in New York City

Stephen Higginson Tyng (March 1, 1800 – September 3, 1885) was a leading clergyman of the evangelical party of the Episcopal Church. He recognized that a new urban ministry was needed in parts of New York City with growing numbers of immigrants. He instituted social service programs as well as altering church interiors to make people feel more welcome.

== Personal life and education ==
Born March 1, 1800, in Newburyport, Massachusetts, to Dudley Atkins Tyng and Sarah Higginson (and the brother of sea captain, merchant, and memoirist Charles Tyng), Stephen Tyng attended Phillips Andover Academy and was graduated from Harvard University in 1817. It was there that Tyng had a strong conversion experience that led him to leave business to pursue the ministry. He then headed to Bristol, RI to study theology and prepare for ordination under Bishop Griswold. Later, the degree of D.D. was conferred upon him by Jefferson College of Philadelphia in 1832, and by Harvard University in 1851.

Tyng married his first wife, Anne DeWolf Griswold (daughter of his mentor), in 1821. Together, they had four children: Anna Elizabeth, Dudley Atkins, Alexander Griswold, and Julia Griswold. She died on May 16, 1832, at 27 years of age and was buried in the churchyard of the Church of the Epiphany. He soon thereafter married Susan Wilson Mitchell in 1833. This marriage produced an additional four children: Thomas Mitchell, Stephen Higginson, Morris Ashurst, and Charles Rockland. It was his last son who wrote and published his biography "Record of the life and work of the Rev. Stephen Higginson Tyng, D.D. and history of St. George's Church, New York, to the close of his rectorship" in 1890. Dr. Tyng died on September 3, 1885, in Irvington-on-Hudson and is buried with his late wife and children at Green-Wood Cemetery in Brooklyn, New York.

== Career ==
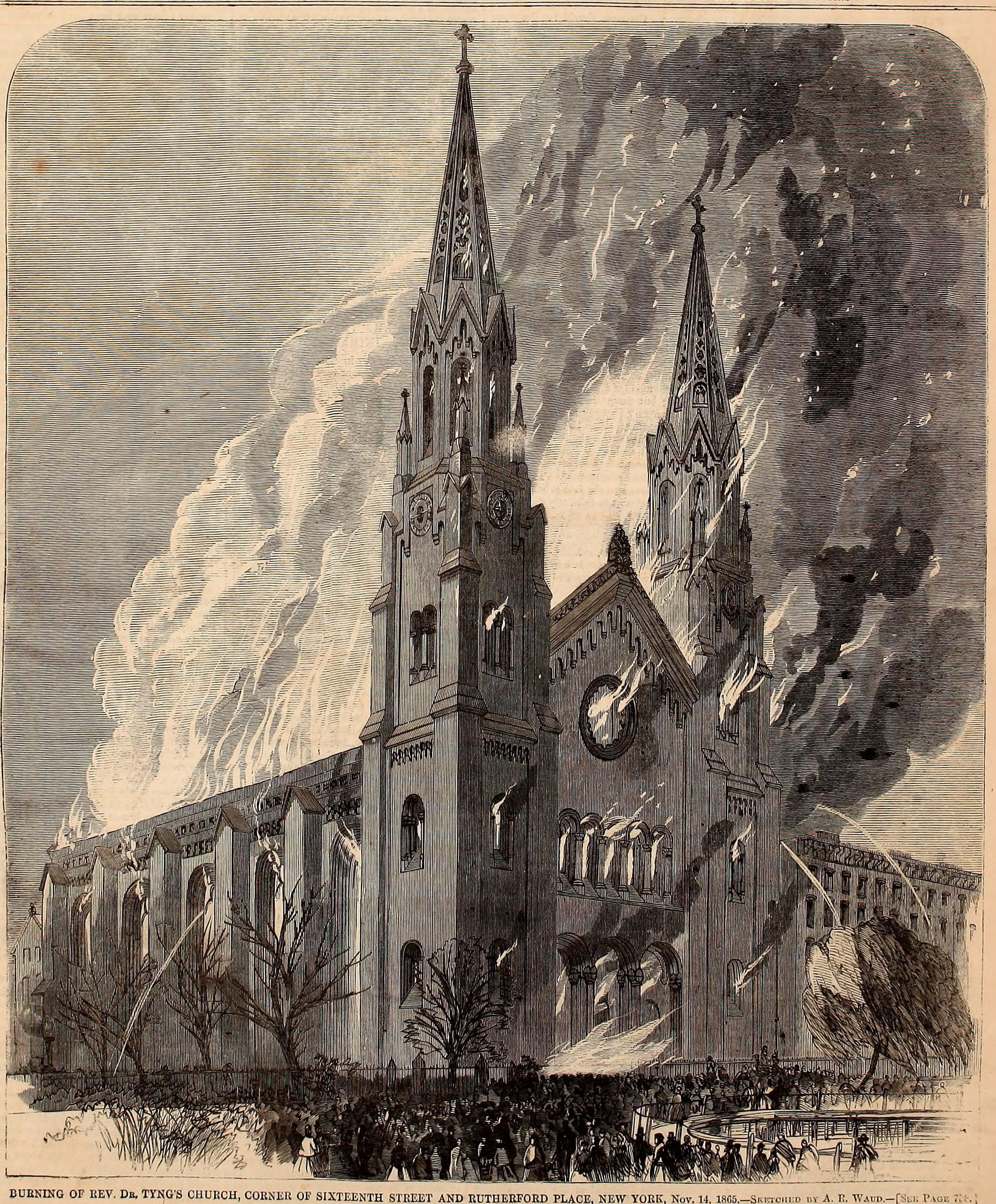
Burning of Tyng's new St. George Church (November 14, 1865)

Tyng was considered to be one of the most notable preachers of the time, and leader in the evangelical party of the Episcopal Church. He was also well connected to other leading Evangelical Episcopalians such as Bishop McIlvaine of Ohio, with whom he shared extensive correspondence throughout his career. Tyng began his career with short stints as rector of St. George's, Georgetown and Queen Anne Parish, Maryland before being called as rector to "Old" St. Paul's Church in Philadelphia. At the time, it was a prominent congregation well ensconced in the evangelical party (he was preceded there by the Rev. Benjamin Allen) and a sign of the young man's great promise as a preacher and presbyter. He was instrumental in renovating the church building to accommodate Sunday school rooms as he was an early proponent of Christian education. Tyng remained at St. Paul's until 1833 when the fledgling Church of the Epiphany called him to be their first rector. Over the next 11 years, he grew the church tremendously until his departure in 1845.

He was called to St. George's Episcopal Church to become their next rector in 1845 and remained there for 33 years until retiring in 1878 as rector emeritus. Initially St. George's was affiliated with Trinity Church and located in Lower Manhattan at Beekman and Cliff streets, near Wall Street. During that time, Tyng converted J.P. Morgan to the faith, and he in turn helped build a new church on East 16th Street and Rutherford Place, facing Stuyvesant Square in New York. Under Tyng, the new St. George served the rich and the poor together, with 2,000 children in its Sunday School and funds raised and sent to four churches in Africa and a school in Moravia . In 1865 the church suffered a major fire, and Tyng supervised reconstruction after a fire. Under his instructions, the interior of the rebuilt church reflected his views: the altar, for instance, was a plain communion table. The architect supervising the interior remodeling was Leopold Eidlitz.

He was the author of numerous pamphlets and publications and was actively involved in several Episcopal organizations such as the Evangelical Knowledge Society, the American Church Missionary Society, and the Episcopal Education Society. He was also publisher for a time of Episcopal Recorder (the evangelical party newspaper) and Protestant Churchman.

== Legacy ==
Tyng's first son, Dudley Atkins, followed in his father's footsteps both as an Episcopal clergyman and by becoming rector of Church of the Epiphany in Philadelphia. He was an outspoken abolitionist who was ultimately ousted from that pulpit for his views. In 1857 Philadelphia was in the midst of a revival and, while visiting a barn on his property, his sleeve became caught in a piece of machinery and resulted in extensive injury. On his deathbed, he asked his father to remind the revivalist to "let us all stand up for Jesus." These parting words became the inspiration for the instantly popular new hymn, "Stand Up, Stand Up for Jesus" written by family friend and Presbyterian minister George Duffield Jr.

Tyng's fourth son, also named Stephen Higginson Tyng (Jr.), was an Episcopal clergyman and founded in 1864 the Church of the Holy Trinity, commonly referred to as Dr. Tyng's Church; it was located on the northeast corner of Madison Avenue and 42nd Street, "just a block from Grand Central Station." There were two structures that housed this congregation. The first was a fanciful, cottage ornee structure designed by Jacob Wrey Mould was completed completed1865. For the second, larger and more famous structure, Tyng used the same architect as his father had (Leopold Eidlitz) for a High Victorian hybrid design of the German Romanesque. It was nicknamed the Church of the Holy Oilcloth for its patterned roof. He was described as the "hardworking churchman, the younger Stephen H. Tyng, who organized it [the rebuidling] in 1874." In 1895 the parish merged with St. James's Episcopal Church, and Holy Trinity was deconsecrated, sold and demolished.

Tyng is the namesake of American industrialist Stephen Tyng Mather (July 4, 1867 – January 22, 1930).

== Images ==
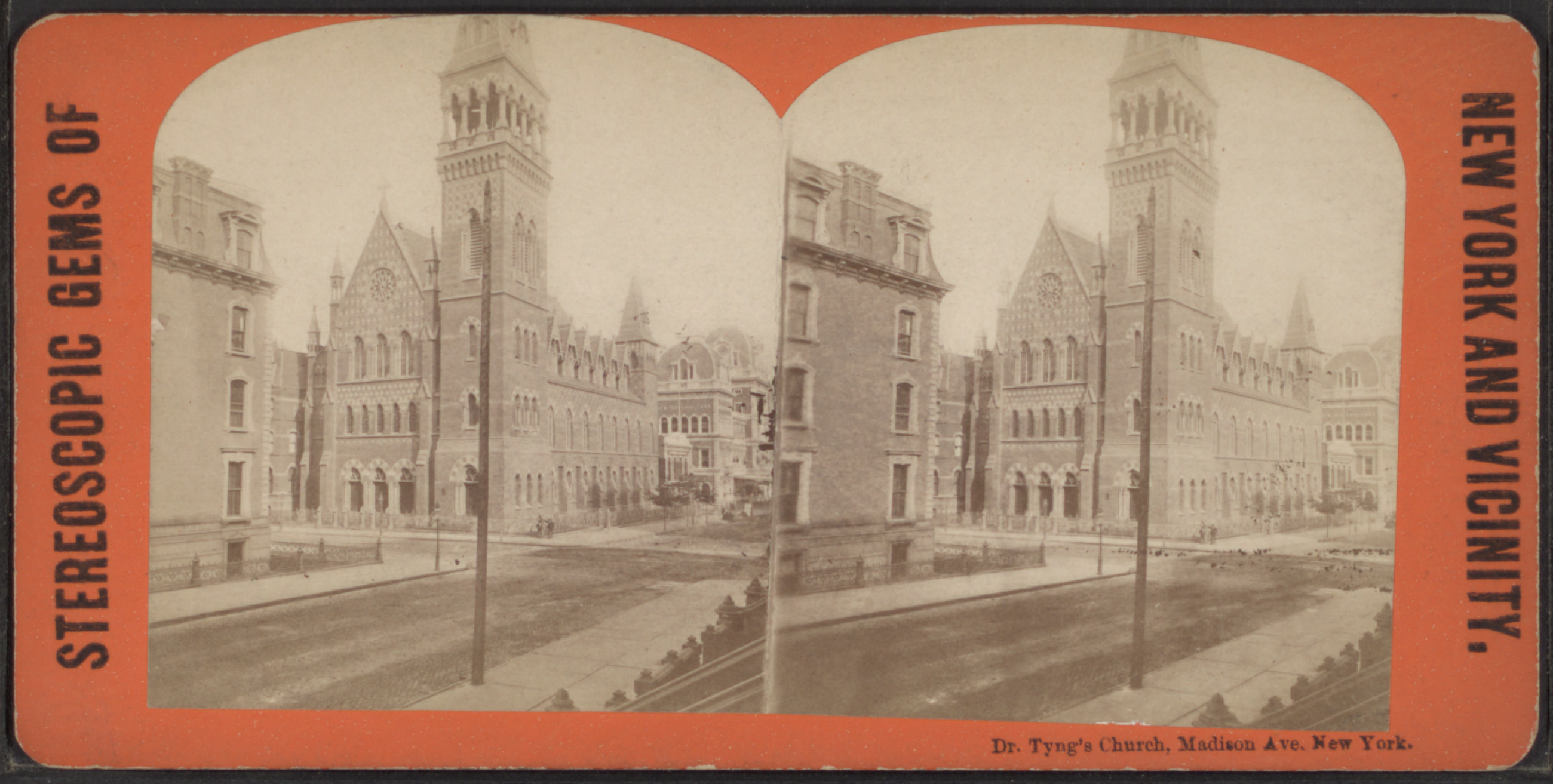
