= Ting, Iran =

Ting تينگ
- Village
- Location within Iran
- Coordinates: 25°16′24″N 61°06′47″E
- Country: Iran
- Province: Sistan and Baluchestan
- County: Chabahar
- Bakhsh: Dashtiari
- Rural District: Negur

Population (2006)
  - Total: 97
- Time zone: UTC+3:30 (IRST)
  - Summer (DST): UTC+4:30 (IRDT)

Ting (Persian: تينگ, also Romanized as Tīng; also known as Tīnk and Tīnk-e Bālā) is a village in Negur Rural District, Dashtiari District, Chabahar County, Sistan and Baluchestan Province, Iran. At the 2006 census, its population was 97, in 31 families.
