= Anthropotechnic =

Anthropotechnic is a term used in art, science and literature to denote something with aspects of both man and machine. In this case, it is claimed that the "modified" does not set a limit but instead opens an infinite horizon that is as wide and limitless as human desires. Another conceptualization is that anthropotechnic is a set of rules that we make to tame, teach, and train ourselves. The concept is distinguished from anthropotechnology, which focuses on the study and improvement of working and living conditions.

== Applications ==
Paintings such as Max Ernst's Oedipus Rex are early examples of the use of this quality. In technology, it is any field of science that attempts to make machines and automation more user-friendly. In sociology, it is used to describe the relationship between man and anything that is perceived as inflexible or inhumane such as slavery, religion or animals. There is a claim that a part of freemasonry, particularly during the 18th century, could also be considered anthropotechnic in the sense that it acted as a caste of technocrats managing society and the human sphere.

== Uses ==
- In her book Education in Human Creative Existential Planning, Anna-Teresa Tymieniecka uses the term Genetic Anthropotechnic as a means of ensuring that only the desired characters are inherited by future generations of human beings though the usage of genetics and hence, avoidance of the "fatalism" of inheritance. Also, in her Phenomenology of Life from the Animal Soul to the Human Mind: In search of experience , she uses the term Anthropotechnic with reference to the ability of human being to turn animals from being dangerous to "human-friendly".
- In their book In Medias Res: Peter Sloterdijk's Spherological Poetics of Being, Willem Schinkel uses the term Anthropotechnic to define cultural forms of automated mental and physical exercises that we humans exhibit in the face of ambiguous risk.
- In their paper Anthropotechnics in vehicle control - Dynamic systems control and guidance by man in light of anthropotechnics, treating approaches to man machine systems optimization, Bernotat uses the term to describe methods of adapting machine to men.
- In her book Bronze and iron: old Latin poetry from its beginnings to 100 B.C., Janet Lembke uses the Anthropotechnic to describe the "monstrous" connection between machine and man, as compared to social and intimate connections.
- In his book Christa Sommerer and Laurent Mignonneau: interactive art research, Gerfried Stocker uses the term with reference to Web 2.0 and Search engines and describes it as "a technique for the humanization of humans".
- In his book Introduction to Sociology, Guy Rocher define Anthropotechnic era as the period of time that began with the slavery of man and metal.

== See also ==
- Engineering psychology
- Human–computer interaction
- Human factors and ergonomics
- Man-machine interface
