= Critique of Cynical Reason =

1983 book by Peter Sloterdijk

- Author: Peter Sloterdijk
- Original title: Kritik der zynischen Vernunft
- Language: German
- Genre: Non-fiction
- Publication date: 1983

Critique of Cynical Reason is a book by the German philosopher Peter Sloterdijk, published in 1983 in two volumes under the German title Kritik der zynischen Vernunft. It discusses philosophical Cynicism and popular cynicism as a societal phenomenon in European history.

== Content ==
In the first volume of Critique of Cynical Reason, Sloterdijk discusses his philosophical premises. The second volume builds on these premises to construct a phenomenology of action that incorporates the many facets of cynicism as they appear in various forms of public discourse. In both volumes, the relationship between texts and images is an integral part of the philosophical discussion.

Repeatedly, Sloterdijk points to the etymological consonant shift from the "K" of the Greek term kunikos to the "C" of the modern cynic as support for his thesis: The original Greek school of philosophy established itself as a subversion of the Ancient Greek Academy and as an outlet for the powerless general populace, whereas the Modern industrial and contemporary post-industrial system degrades the concept so it applies primarily to mercantile exchanges of tradable goods, including ideas. One illustration that Sloterdijk employs to make this point is the activity of agents and double-agents, which to him incorporates contemporary cynicism as an incarnation of tactical thinking, pragmatic maneuvering, silencing, and misspeaking. A true Enlightenment in the spirit of Immanuel Kant's essays "What is Enlightenment?" and Perpetual Peace: A Philosophical Sketch never has existed, Sloterdijk concludes.

Sloterdijk describes the evolution of middle and upper-class consciousness by employing negative examples, which he draws from European history and from the history of education. He describes World War II as a first climax of a "system of hollowing out the self" (namely, capitalism) that, "armed to the teeth, wants to live forever."

Sloterdijk's analysis of Dadaism as artists practiced it in Berlin accompanies his disclosing of the variations of irony and sarcasm that all the political camps of the time between the two World Wars employed (especially Dadaists, Social Democrats, National Socialists, Communists in their derisive attempts to incite their supporters against those of all other points of view). He analyzes Nazi texts that – Sloterdijk claims – intend to "rhetorically rescue" the Third Reich, and sets them against the "humanist authors" of the time, like Erich Kästner and Erich Maria Remarque, who, he says, stood in the midst of "a rancorous war of all against all." Passages from the works of these authors, Sloterdijk reveals, clearly point to the cynical atmosphere of their time, and take analyzable, predictable forms that can be fruitfully scrutinized.

Additionally, Sloterdijk attempts to trace the reception history of Kant's three Critiques and their various interpretations up to contemporary times. He attempts to show that Kant's "critical trade" became instrumentalized via the premise of Francis Bacon's aphorism that "knowledge is power," and was finally subverted and neutered by it. Moreover, he uses the ancient Greek Cynicism as a foil for the contemporary, inhumane cynicism that evolved, so Sloterdijk claims, through a combination of middle-class semiologies and grand philosophical ambitions. Sloterdijk concludes that, unlike the ancient Greek version, Cynicism no longer stands for values of the natural and ethical kind that bind people beyond their religious and economically useful convictions. Rather, it has become a mode of thought that defines its actions in terms of a "final end" of a purely materialistic sort and reduces the "ought" to an economic strategy aimed at maximizing profit. This contemporary sort of Cynicism remains silent, however, when it comes to social, anthropogenous, and altruistic goals having to do with the "in" and "for" of the "good life" the original Cynics were seeking.

In the final chapter, Sloterdijk points out that he regards a "good life" not simply as an external fact, but as a "being embedded" in a "Whole" that constantly reorganizes itself and renews itself, and that humankind creates out of its own understanding and motivations. He concludes with a precise analysis of Martin Heidegger's magnum opus Being and Time and seeks out clarifications regarding particular acts of creating, especially as they apply to the events and the artistic activity of the time between the two World Wars.
