= Meinhard Miegel =

German political scientist

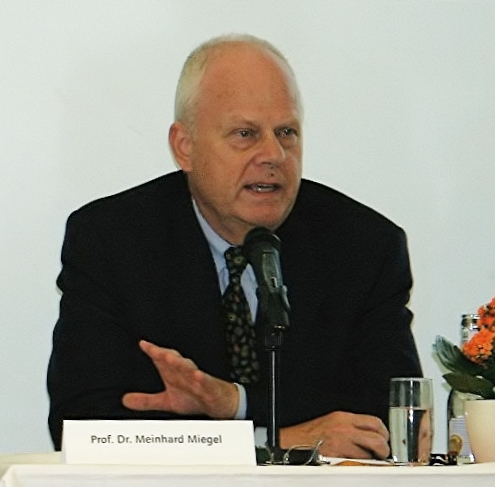
Meinhard Miegel

Meinhard Miegel (born 23 April 1939 in Vienna) is a German political scientist. He is known for his work on the conditions of the economy and society. He co-founded the Institut für Wirtschaft und Gesellschaft with Kurt Biedenkopf in 1977, and served as a Professor at the University of Leipzig from 1992. He became a member of the European Academy of Sciences and Arts in 1994, received the Corine Literature Prize in 2002, the Hanns Martin Schleyer Prize in 2004 and the Theodor Heuss Prize in 2005.

== Selected bibliography ==
- Der Unternehmensbegriff des Aktiengesetzes 1965. Unter besonderer Berücksichtigung der allgemeinen Problematik des Unternehmensbegriffs. Gehlen, Bad Homburg/Berlin/Zürich 1970 (Dissertation)
- mit Kurt H. Biedenkopf: Wege aus der Arbeitslosigkeit. Arbeitsmarktpolitik in der sozialen Marktwirtschaft. Verlag Bonn Aktuell, Stuttgart 1978, ISBN 3-87959-083-4
- Welches Wachstum und welchen Wohlstand brauchen wir?, in: Aus Politik und Zeitgeschichte, Bundeszentrale für Politische Bildung (Hrsg.), 27-28/2012, Juni 2012
