= Peter Sloterdijk =

German philosopher (born 1947)

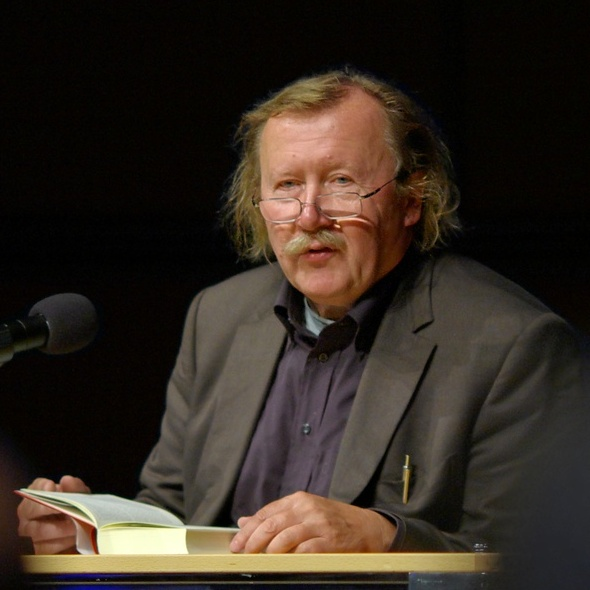
- Sloterdijk in 2009
- Born: 26 June 1947 (age 79); Karlsruhe, Württemberg-Baden, Germany

Education
- Education: LMU Munich; University of Hamburg
- Thesis: Genre theory and genre history of autobiography in the Weimar Republic 1918–1933
- Doctoral advisor: Klaus Briegleb

Philosophical work
- Era: Contemporary philosophy
- Region: Western philosophy
- School: Phenomenology, philosophical anthropology, posthumanism, social philosophy
- Institutions: Karlsruhe University of Arts and Design
- Notable ideas: Spherology (Sphärologie), human zoo (Menschenpark)

Peter Sloterdijk (/ˈsloʊtərdaɪk/; German: [ˈsloːtɐˌdaɪk]; born 26 June 1947) is a German philosopher and cultural theorist. He was a professor of philosophy and media theory at and Rector from 2001 to 2015 of the Karlsruhe University of Arts and Design. He co-hosted the German television show Das Philosophische Quartett from 2002 until 2012.

== Biography ==
Sloterdijk's father was Dutch; his mother was German. He studied philosophy, German studies and history at LMU Munich and the University of Hamburg from 1968 to 1974. In 1975, he received his PhD from the University of Hamburg. In 1978, he became a disciple of Rajneesh, and lived in his ashram until 1980. In the 1980s, he worked as a freelance writer, and published his Critique of Cynical Reason (German: Kritik der zynischen Vernunft) in 1983. Sloterdijk has since published a number of philosophical works acclaimed in Germany. In 2001, he was named chancellor of the Karlsruhe University of Arts and Design, part of the ZKM Center for Art and Media Karlsruhe. His best-known Karlsruhe student and former assistant is Marc Jongen, a member of the Bundestag. In 2002, Sloterdijk began to co-host Das Philosophische Quartett ('The Philosophical Quartet'), a show on the German ZDF television channel devoted to discussing key contemporary issues in-depth.

== Philosophical stance ==
Sloterdijk rejects the existence of dualisms—body and soul, subject and object, culture and nature, etc.—since their interactions, "spaces of coexistence", and common technological advancement create hybrid realities. Sloterdijk's ideas are sometimes referred to as posthumanism, and seek to integrate different components that have been, in his opinion, erroneously considered detached from each other. Consequently, he proposes the creation of an "ontological constitution" that would incorporate all beings—humans, animals, plants, and machines.

== Philosophical style ==
In the style of Nietzsche, Sloterdijk remains convinced that contemporary philosophers have to think dangerously and let themselves be "kidnapped" by contemporary "hyper-complexities": they must forsake our present humanist and nationalist world for a wider horizon at once ecological and global. Sloterdijk's philosophical style strikes a balance between the firm academicism of a scholarly professor and a certain sense of anti-academicism (witness his ongoing interest in the ideas of Osho, of whom he became a disciple in the late seventies). Taking a sociological stance, Andreas Dorschel sees Sloterdijk's timely innovation at the beginning of the 21st century in having introduced the principles of celebrity into philosophy. Sloterdijk himself, viewing exaggeration as necessary to catch attention, describes the way he presents his ideas as "hyperbolic" (hyperbolisch).

== Major works ==
=== Critique of Cynical Reason ===
The Kritik der zynischen Vernunft, published by Suhrkamp in 1983 (and in English as Critique of Cynical Reason, 1987), became the best-selling work on philosophy in the German language since the Second World War and launched Sloterdijk's career as an author.

=== Spheres ===
The trilogy Spheres is the philosopher's magnum opus. The first volume was published in 1998, the second in 1999, and the last in 2004.

Spheres deals with "spaces of coexistence", spaces commonly overlooked or taken for granted which conceal information crucial to developing an understanding of humanity. The exploration of these spheres begins with the basic difference between mammals and other animals: the biological and utopian comfort of the mother's womb, which humans try to recreate through science, ideology, and religion. From these microspheres (ontological relations such as fetus-placenta) to macrospheres (macro-uteri such as states), Sloterdijk analyzes spheres where humans try but fail to dwell and traces a connection between vital crises (e.g., emptiness and narcissistic detachment) and crises created when a sphere shatters.

Sloterdijk has said that the first paragraphs of Spheres are "the book that Heidegger should have written", a companion volume to Being and Time, namely, "Being and Space". He was referring to his initial exploration of the idea of Dasein, which is then taken further as Sloterdijk distances himself from Heidegger's positions.

=== Nietzsche Apostle ===
On 25 August 2000, in Weimar, Sloterdijk gave a speech on Nietzsche; the occasion was the centennial of the latter philosopher's death. The speech was later printed as a short book and translated into English. Sloterdijk presented the idea that language is fundamentally narcissistic: individuals, states and religions use language to promote and validate themselves. Historically however, Christianity and norms in Western culture have prevented orators and authors from directly praising themselves, so that for example they would instead venerate God or praise the dead in eulogies, to demonstrate their own skill by proxy. In Sloterdijk's account, Nietzsche broke with this norm by regularly praising himself in his own work.

For examples of classical Western "proxy-narcissism", Sloterdijk cites Otfrid of Weissenburg, Thomas Jefferson and Leo Tolstoy, each of whom prepared edited versions of the four Gospels: the Evangelienbuch, the Jefferson Bible and the Gospel in Brief, respectively. For Sloterdijk, each work can be regarded as "a fifth gospel" in which the editor validates his own culture by editing tradition to conform to his own historical situation. With this background, Sloterdijk explains that Nietzsche also presented his work Thus Spoke Zarathustra as a kind of fifth gospel. In Sloterdijk's account, Nietzsche engages in narcissism to an embarrassing degree, particularly in Ecce Homo, promoting a form of individualism and presenting himself and his philosophy as a brand. However, just as the Christian Gospels were appropriated by the above editors, so too was Nietzsche's thought appropriated and misinterpreted by the Nazis. Sloterdijk concludes the work by comparing Nietzsche's individualism with that of Ralph Waldo Emerson, as in Self-Reliance.

=== Globalization ===
Sloterdijk also argues that the current concept of globalization lacks historical perspective. In his view it is merely the third wave in a process of overcoming distances (the first wave being the metaphysical globalization of the Greek cosmology and the second the nautical globalization of the 15th and 16th centuries). The difference for Sloterdijk is that, while the second wave created cosmopolitanism, the third is creating a global provincialism. Sloterdijk's sketch of a philosophical history of globalization can be found in Im Weltinnenraum des Kapitals (2005; translated as In the World Interior of Capital), subtitled "Die letzte Kugel" ("The final sphere"). In an interview with Noema Magazine, Sloterdijk expanded upon the idea of "planetary co-immunism", referring to the need to "share the means of protection even with the most distant members of the family of man/woman" when faced with shared threats such as pandemics.

=== Rage and Time ===
In his Zorn und Zeit (translated as Rage and Time), Sloterdijk characterizes the emotion of rage as a psychopolitical force throughout human history. The political aspects are especially pronounced in the Western tradition, beginning with the opening words of Homer's Iliad, "Of the rage of Achilles, son of Peleus, sing, O Goddess...". Sloterdijk acknowledges the contributions of psychoanalysis for our understanding of strong emotional attitudes: "In conformity with its basic erotodynamic approach, psychoanalysis brought much hatred to light, the other side of life." (Rage and Time, p. 14) Importantly, for Sloterdijk, Judeo-Christian conceptions of God ultimately "piggyback" on the feelings of rage and resentment, creating "metaphysical revenge banks". For Sloterdijk, "God thus becomes the location of a transcendent repository of suspended human rage-savings and frozen plans of revenge."

== Reprogenetics dispute ==
Shortly after Sloterdijk conducted a symposium on philosophy and Heidegger, he stirred up controversy with his essay "Regeln für den Menschenpark" ("Rules for the Human Zoo", 1999). In this text, Sloterdijk regards cultures and civilizations as "anthropogenic hothouses," installations for the cultivation of human beings; just as we have established wildlife preserves to protect certain animal species, so too ought we to adopt more deliberate policies to ensure the survival of Aristotle's zoon politikon.

"The taming of man has failed", Sloterdijk laments. "Civilisation's potential for barbarism is growing; the everyday bestialisation of man is on the increase."

Because of the eugenic policies of the Nazis in Germany's recent history, such discussions are seen in Germany as carrying a sinister load. Breaking a German taboo on the discussion of genetic manipulation, Sloterdijk's essay suggests that the advent of new genetic technologies requires more forthright discussion and regulation of "bio-cultural" reproduction. In the eyes of Habermas, this made Sloterdijk a "fascist". Sloterdijk replied that this was, itself, resorting to "fascist" tactics to discredit him. The core of the controversy was not only Sloterdijk's ideas but also his use of the German words Züchtung ("breeding", "cultivation") and Selektion ("selection").

Sloterdijk rejected the accusation of Nazism, which he considered alien to his historical context. Still, the paper started a controversy in which Sloterdijk was strongly criticized, both for his alleged usage of a fascist rhetoric to promote Plato's vision of a government with absolute control over the population, and for committing a non-normative, simplistic reduction of the bioethical issue itself. This second criticism was based on the vagueness of Sloterdijk's position on how exactly society would be affected by developments in genetic science. After the controversy multiplied positions both for and against him, Die Zeit published an open letter from Sloterdijk to Habermas in which he vehemently accused Habermas of "criticizing behind his back" and espousing a view of humanism that Sloterdijk had declared dead.

== Welfare state dispute ==
Another dispute emerged after Sloterdijk's article "Die Revolution der gebenden Hand" (13 June 2009; transl. "The revolution of the giving hand") in the Frankfurter Allgemeine, one of Germany's most widely read newspapers. There Sloterdijk claimed that the national welfare state is a "fiscal kleptocracy" that had transformed the country into a "swamp of resentment" and degraded its citizens into "mystified subjects of tax law".

Sloterdijk opened the text with the famous quote of leftist critics of capitalism (made famous in the 19th century by Proudhon in his "What Is Property?") "Property is theft", stating, however, that it is nowadays the modern state that is the biggest taker. "We are living in a fiscal grabbing semi-socialism – and nobody calls for a fiscal civil war." He repeated his statements and stirred up the debate in his articles titled "Kleptokratie des Staates" (transl. "Kleptocracy of the state") and "Aufbruch der Leistungsträger" (transl. "Uprising of the performers") in the German monthly Cicero – Magazin für politische Kultur.

According to Sloterdijk, the institutions of the welfare state lend themselves to a system that privileges the marginalized, but relies, unsustainably, on the class of citizens who are materially successful. Sloterdijk's provocative recommendation was that income taxes should be deeply reduced, the difference being made up by donations from the rich in a system that would reward higher givers with social status. Achievers would be praised for their generosity, rather than being made to feel guilty for their success, or resentful of society's dependence on them.

In January 2010, an English translation was published, titled "A Grasping Hand – The modern democratic state pillages its productive citizens", in Forbes and in the Winter 2010 issue of City Journal. Sloterdijk's 2010 book, Die nehmende Hand und die gebende Seite, contains the texts that triggered the 2009–2010 welfare state dispute.

== Honours and awards ==
- 1993: Ernst Robert Curtius Prize for Essay Writing
- 2000: Friedrich Märker Prize for Essay Writing
- 2001: Christian Kellerer Prize for the future of philosophical thought
- 2005: Business Book Award for the Financial Times Deutschland
- 2005: Sigmund Freud Prize for Scientific Prose
- 2005: Austrian Decoration for Science and Art
- 2006: Commander of the Ordre des Arts et des Lettres
- 2008: Lessing Prize for Criticism
- 2008: Cicero Prize
- 2008: Leipzig International Mendelssohn Prize (category Social Responsibility)
- 2009: BDA award for architectural criticism
- 2013: Ludwig Börne Prize
- 2021: European Prize for Political Culture of the Hans Ringier Foundation (50,000 Franc)

Honorary doctorates

- 2011: Honorary doctorate from the University of Nijmegen, Netherlands
- 2023: Honorary doctorate from the West University of Timișoara, Romania

== Film appearances ==
- Marx Reloaded, Arte, April 2011

== List of works ==
=== Works in English translation ===
- Critique of Cynical Reason, translation by Michael Eldred; foreword by Andreas Huyssen, Minneapolis, University of Minnesota Press, 1988. ISBN 0-8166-1586-1
- Thinker on Stage: Nietzsche's Materialism, translation by Jamie Owen Daniel; foreword by Jochen Schulte-Sasse, Minneapolis, University of Minnesota Press, 1989. ISBN 0-8166-1765-1
- Theory of the Post-War Periods: Observations on Franco-German relations since 1945, translation by Robert Payne; foreword by Klaus-Dieter Müller, Springer, 2008. ISBN 3-211-79913-3
- Terror from the Air, translation by Amy Patton, Los Angeles, Semiotext(e), 2009. ISBN 1-58435-072-5
- God's Zeal: The Battle of the Three Monotheisms, Polity Pr., 2009. ISBN 978-0-7456-4507-0
- Derrida, an Egyptian, Polity Pr., 2009. ISBN 0-7456-4639-5
- Rage and Time, translation by Mario Wenning, New York, Columbia University Press, 2010. ISBN 978-0-231-14522-0
- Neither Sun nor Death, translation by Steven Corcoran, Semiotext(e), 2011. ISBN 978-1-58435-091-0 – Sloterdijk answers questions posed by German writer Hans-Jürgen Heinrichs, commenting on such issues as technological mutation, development media, communication technologies, and his own intellectual itinerary.
- Bubbles: Spheres Volume I: Microspherology, translation by Wieland Hoban, Los Angeles, Semiotext(e), 2011. ISBN 1-58435-104-7
- The Art of Philosophy: Wisdom as a Practice, translation by Karen Margolis, New York, Columbia University Press, 2012. ISBN 978-0-231-15870-1
- You Must Change Your Life, translation by Wieland Hoban, Cambridge, Polity Press, 2013. ISBN 978-0-7456-4921-4
- In the World Interior of Capital: Towards a Philosophical Theory of Globalization, translation by Wieland Hoban, Cambridge, Polity Press, 2013. ISBN 978-0-7456-4769-2
- Nietzsche Apostle, (Semiotext(e)/Intervention Series), translation by Steve Corcoran, Los Angeles, Semiotext(e), 2013. ISBN 978-1-58435-099-6
- Globes: Spheres Volume II: Macrospherology, translation by Wieland Hoban, Los Angeles, Semiotext(e), 2014. ISBN 1-58435-160-8
- Foams: Spheres Volume III: Plural Spherology, translation by Wieland Hoban, Los Angeles, Semiotext(e), 2016. ISBN 1-58435-187-X
- Not Saved: Essays after Heidegger, translation by Ian Alexander Moore and Christopher Turner, Cambridge, Polity Press, 2016.
- "The Domestication of Human Beings and the Expansion of Solidarities", in J. Koltan (ed.) Solidarity and the Crisis of Trust, translated by Jeremy Gaines, Gdansk: European Solidarity Centre, 2016, pp. 79–93 (http://www.ecs.gda.pl/title,pid,1471.html).
- What Happened in the 20th Century?, translation by Christopher Turner, Cambridge, Polity Press, 2018.
- After God, translation by Ian Alexander Moore, Polity Press, 2020.
- Infinite Mobilization, translation by Sandra Berjan, Polity Press, 2020.
- Making the Heavens Speak: Religion as Poetry, translation by Robert Hughes, Polity Press, 2022.
- Prometheus’s Remorse: From the Gift of Fire to Global Arson, translated by Hunter Bolin, Semiotext(e), 2024.
- The Terrible Children of Modernity: An Antigenealogical Experiment, translation by Oliver Berghof, Columbia University Press, 2025.

=== Works in Spanish translation ===
- Estrés y Libertad: traducción de Paula Kuffer, Buenos Aires, Ediciones Godot, 2017. ISBN 978-987-4086-20-4
- Crítica de la razón cínica, Ediciones Siruela; Edición 2019. ISBN 978-841-7996-07-9
- Esferas I, Ediciones Siruela; Edición 2003. ISBN 978-847-8446-54-4
- Esferas II, Ediciones Siruela; Edición 2014. ISBN 978-847-8447-54-1
- Esferas III, Ediciones Siruela; Edición 2014. ISBN 978-847-8449-51-4

=== Original German titles ===
- Kritik der zynischen Vernunft, 1983.
- Der Zauberbaum. Die Entstehung der Psychoanalyse im Jahr 1785, 1985.
- Der Denker auf der Bühne. Nietzsches Materialismus, 1986. (Thinker on Stage: Nietzsche's Materialism)
- Kopernikanische Mobilmachung und ptolmäische Abrüstung, 1986.
- Zur Welt kommen – Zur Sprache kommen. Frankfurter Vorlesungen, 1988.
- Eurotaoismus. Zur Kritik der politischen Kinetik, 1989.
- Versprechen auf Deutsch. Rede über das eigene Land, 1990.
- Weltfremdheit, 1993.
- Falls Europa erwacht. Gedanken zum Programm einer Weltmacht am Ende des Zeitalters seiner politischen Absence, 1994.
- Scheintod im Denken – Von Philosophie und Wissenschaft als Übung, Frankfurt am Main (Suhrkamp), 1995.
- Im selben Boot – Versuch über die Hyperpolitik, Frankfurt am Main (Suhrkamp), 1995.
- Selbstversuch, Ein Gespräch mit Carlos Oliveira, 1996.
- Der starke Grund zusammen zu sein. Erinnerungen an die Erfindung des Volkes, 1998.
- Sphären I – Blasen, Mikrosphärologie, 1998. (Spheres I)
- Sphären II – Globen, Makrosphärologie, 1999. (Spheres II)
- Regeln für den Menschenpark. Ein Antwortschreiben zu Heideggers Brief über den Humanismus, 1999.
- Die Verachtung der Massen. Versuch über Kulturkämpfe in der modernen Gesellschaft, 2000.
- Über die Verbesserung der guten Nachricht. Nietzsches fünftes Evangelium. Rede zum 100. Todestag von Friedrich Nietzsche, 2000.
- Nicht gerettet. Versuche nach Heidegger, 2001.
- Die Sonne und der Tod, Dialogische Untersuchungen mit Hans-Jürgen Heinrichs, 2001.
- Tau von den Bermudas. Über einige Regime der Phantasie, 2001.
- Luftbeben. An den Wurzeln des Terrors, 2002.
- Sphären III – Schäume, Plurale Sphärologie, 2004. (Spheres III)
- Im Weltinnenraum des Kapitals, 2005.
- Was zählt, kehrt wieder. Philosophische Dialogue, with Alain Finkielkraut (from French), 2005.
- Zorn und Zeit. Politisch-psychologischer Versuch, 2006. ISBN 3-518-41840-8
- Der ästhetische Imperativ, 2007.
- Derrida, ein Ägypter, 2007.
- Gottes Eifer. Vom Kampf der drei Monotheismen, Frankfurt am Main (Insel), 2007.
- Theorie der Nachkriegszeiten, (Suhrkamp), 2008.
- Du mußt dein Leben ändern, Frankfurt am Main (Suhrkamp), 2009.
- Philosophische Temperamente Von Platon bis Foucault, München (Diederichs) 2009. ISBN 978-3-424-35016-6
- Die nehmende Hand und die gebende Seite, (Suhrkamp), 2010.
- Die schrecklichen Kinder der Neuzeit, (Suhrkamp), 2014.
- Was geschah im 20. Jahrhundert? Unterwegs zu einer Kritik der extremistischen Vernunft, (Suhrkamp), 2016.
- Das Schelling-Projekt. Ein Bericht. Suhrkamp, Berlin 2016, ISBN 978-3-518-42524-4.
- Nach Gott: Glaubens- und Unglaubensversuche. Suhrkamp, Berlin 2017, ISBN 978-3-518-42632-6 bzw. ISBN 3-518-42632-X.
- Neue Zeilen und Tage. Notizen 2011–2013. Suhrkamp, Berlin 2018, ISBN 978-3-518-42844-3.
- Polyloquien. Ein Brevier. Hrsg. v. Raimund Fellinger, Suhrkamp, Berlin 2018, ISBN 978-3-518-42775-0.
- Den Himmel zum Sprechen bringen. Über Theopoesie. Suhrkamp, Berlin 2020, ISBN 978-3-518-42933-4.
- Der Staat streift seine Samthandschuhe ab. Ausgewählte Gespräche und Beiträge 2020–2021. Suhrkamp, Berlin 2021, ISBN 978-3-518-47222-4.
- Wer noch kein Grau gedacht hat. Eine Farbenlehre. Suhrkamp, Berlin 2022, ISBN 978-3-518-43068-2.
- Die Reue des Prometheus. Von der Gabe des Feuers zur globalen Brandstiftung. Suhrkamp, Berlin 2023, ISBN 978-3-518-02985-5.
- Zeilen und Tage III. Notizen 2013–2016. Suhrkamp, Berlin 2023, ISBN 978-3-518-43147-4
- Der Kontinent ohne Eigenschaften. Lesezeichen im Buch Europa. Suhrkamp, Berlin 2024 ISBN 978-3-518-43214-3
