= Charles Tyng =

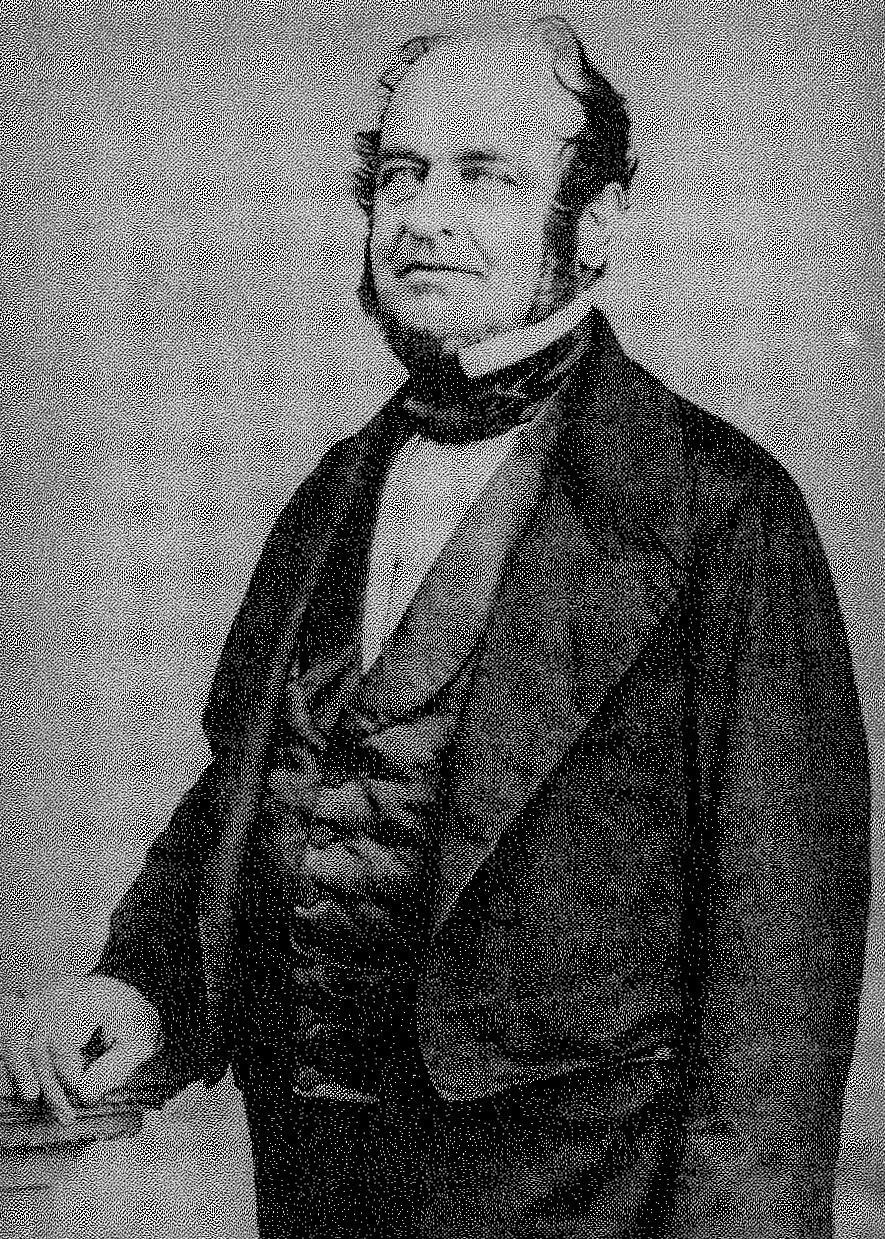
Charles Tyng (1801–1879)

Charles Tyng (August 24, 1801 – June 20, 1879) was a New England sea captain and merchant, notable for a memoir written near the end of his life.

Although Tyng was born, the fifth of eight children, to a prosperous upper-middle class family, his mother died when he was seven, and Tyng thereafter seemed unable to apply himself to his studies. Sent to sea at age thirteen, Tyng matured quickly and, by his early twenties—beginning within the empire of Boston merchant prince Thomas Handasyd Perkins—Tyng was captaining his own ships, in the process encountering sharks, pirates, mutinies, shipwrecks, horrific storms, and cholera. The memoir of his early life has been called "an irreplaceable account of the nation's seafaring history, an authentic chronicle that needs no fictional embellishment," for instance, shedding additional light on the Canton system in China and the folklore of early nineteenth-century seamen.

In 1826, Tyng married Anna Arnold (1804–1831), who died before they had been married seven years. In 1833, Tyng married Anna Amelia (or Amelia Anna) McAlpine (1816–1885), sister of civil engineer William J. McAlpine. The Tyngs spent thirty years of their married life in Havana (where Tyng played a significant role in a diplomatic contretemps called the Black Warrior Affair) before they retired to Newburyport, Massachusetts. Tyng died in 1879 while visiting his daughter in Providence, Rhode Island.

Tyng's memoir was published in 1999 as Before the Wind: The Memoir of an American Sea Captain, 1808–1833 (Viking Penguin, 1999). In his review for The New York Times, W. Jeffrey Bolster wrote that the book had "authenticity and nerve" and was "a testimonial to an ambitious but likable man with a penchant for the unusual," a writer with a "storyteller's flair" and a "novelist's eye for detail."
