= Norbert Bolz =

German philosopher (born 1953)

- Born: 17 April 1953 (age 73); Ludwigshafen, Rhineland-Palatinate, West Germany

Education
- Education: FU Berlin (PhD, Hab.)

Philosophical work
- Era: 20th-century philosophy
- Region: Western philosophy
- Main interests: Media theory, communication theory
- Notable ideas: Theorie der neuen Medien

Norbert Bolz (born 17 April 1953) is a German media theorist. He served as a professor at Technische Universität Berlin until his retirement in 2018.

Bolz developed a media theory, the "Theorie der neuen Medien", that is influenced by Friedrich Nietzsche, Walter Benjamin and Marshall McLuhan.

== Film and TV appearances ==
- Marx Reloaded, Arte, April 2011.
- Unter den Linden, Phoenix, June 2021.
