= List of films set in Madrid =

In the history of motion pictures, many films have been set in Madrid or a fictionalized version thereof.

The list that follows is sorted by the year the film was released.

== 1940s ==
- The Tower of the Seven Hunchbacks (Edgar Neville, 1944)
- The Crime of Bordadores Street (Edgar Neville, 1946)

== 1950s ==
- Furrows (José Antonio Nieves Conde, 1951)
- Death of a Cyclist (Juan Antonio Bardem, 1955)
- Uncle Hyacynth (Ladislao Vajda, 1956)
- Tip on a Dead Jockey (Richard Thorpe, 1957)
- Red Cross Girls (Rafael J. Salvia, 1958)
- El Pisito (Marco Ferreri, 1959)

== 1960s ==
- The Delinquents (Carlos Saura, 1960)
- Atraco a las tres (José María Forqué, 1962)
- The Executioner (Luis García Berlanga, 1963)
- The Pleasure Seekers (Jean Negulesco, 1964)
- La ciudad no es para mí (Pedro Lazaga, 1966)

== 1970s ==
- La cabina (Antonio Mercero, 1972)
- La escopeta nacional (Luis García Berlanga, 1978)
- Black Brood (Manuel Gutiérrez Aragón, 1977)
- Solos en la madrugada (José Luis Garci, 1978)
- Ogro (Gillo Pontecorvo, 1979)

== 1980s ==
- Opera prima (Fernando Trueba, 1980)
- Pepi, Luci, Bom (Pedro Almodóvar, 1980)
- Navajeros (Eloy de la Iglesia, 1980)
- Maravillas (Manuel Gutiérrez Aragón, 1981)
- Deprisa, deprisa (Carlos Saura, 1981)
- The Beehive (Mario Camus, 1982)
- Colegas (Eloy de la Iglesia, 1982)
- Labyrinth of Passion (Pedro Almodóvar, 1982)
- Bicycles Are for the Summer (Jaime Chávarri, 1984)
- What Have I Done to Deserve This? (Pedro Almodóvar, 1984)
- The Hit (Stephen Frears, 1984)
- The Last of Philip Banter (Hervé Hachuel, 1986)
- Law of Desire (Pedro Almodóvar, 1987)
- Hostages in the Barrio (Eloy de la Iglesia, 1987)
- Women on the Verge of a Nervous Breakdown (Pedro Almodóvar, 1988)
- Esquilache (Josefina Molina, 1989)
- Going South Shopping (Fernando Colomo, 1989)

== 1990s ==
- The Ages of Lulu (Bigas Luna, 1990)
- Lovers (Vicente Aranda, 1991)
- Prince of Shadows (Pilar Miró, 1991)
- High Heels (Pedro Almodóvar, 1991)
- Dream of Light (Víctor Erice, 1992)
- The Fencing Master (Pedro Olea, 1992)
- Kika (Pedro Almodóvar, 1993)
- Outrage! (Carlos Saura, 1993)
- Madregilda (Francisco Regueiro, 1993)
- The Worst Years of Our Lives (Emilio Martínez Lázaro, 1994)
- Todo es mentira (Álvaro Fernández Armero, 1994)
- Running Out of Time (Imanol Uribe, 1994)
- The Day of the Beast (Álex de la Iglesia, 1995)
- Nobody Will Speak of Us When We're Dead (Agustín Díaz Yanes, 1995)
- Mouth to Mouth (Manuel Gómez Pereira, 1995)
- Stories from the Kronen (Montxo Armendáriz, 1995)
- África (Alfonso Ungría, 1996)
- Thesis (Alejandro Amenábar, 1996)
- Taxi (Carlos Saura, 1996)
- Live Flesh (Pedro Almodóvar, 1997)
- Open Your Eyes (Alejandro Amenábar, 1997)
- Martín (Hache) (Adolfo Aristarain, 1997)
- Torrente, the Dumb Arm of the Law (Santiago Segura, 1998)
- Mensaka (Salvador García Ruiz, 1998)
- Lovers of the Arctic Circle (Julio Medem, 1998)
- Barrio (Fernando León de Aranoa, 1998)
- Spanish Fly (Daphna Kastner, 1998)
- A Time for Defiance (Antonio Mercero, 1998)
- Manolito Four Eyes (Miguel Albaladejo, 1999)

== 2000s ==
- What You Never Knew (Juan Vicente Córdoba, 2000)
- Friends Have Reasons (Gerardo Herrero, 2000)
- Asfalto (Daniel Calparsoro, 2000)
- Fill Me with Life (Josecho San Mateo, 2000)
- El Bola (Achero Mañas, 2000)
- Common Wealth (Álex de la Iglesia, 2000)
- Sex and Lucia (Julio Medem, 2001)
- Desire (Gerardo Vera, 2002)
- The Weakness of the Bolshevik (Manuel Martín Cuenca, 2003)
- Bulgarian Lovers (Eloy de la Iglesia, 2003)
- Chill Out! (Dunia Ayaso and Félix Sabroso, 2003)
- Tiovivo c. 1950 (José Luis Garci, 2004)
- Héctor (Gracia Querejeta, 2004)
- Princesses (Fernando León de Aranoa, 2005)
- Dark Blue Almost Black (Daniel Sánchez Arévalo, 2006)
- The Near East (Fernando Colomo, 2006)
- 13 Roses (Emilio Martínez-Lázaro, 2007)
- Mataharis (Icíar Bollaín, 2007)
- Boystown (Juan Flahn, 2007)
- Touch the Sky (Marcos Carnevale, 2007)
- The Bourne Ultimatum (Paul Greengrass, 2007)
- Blood in May (José Luis Garci, 2008)
- The Limits of Control (Jim Jarmusch, 2009)

== 2010s ==
- Lope: The Outlaw (Andrucha Waddington, 2010)
- Every Song Is About Me (Jonás Trueba, 2010)
- The Last Circus (Álex de la Iglesia, 2010)
- No Rest for the Wicked (Enrique Urbizu, 2011)
- Diamond Flash (Carlos Vermut, 2011)
- The Sleeping Voice (Benito Zambrano, 2011)
- Extraterrestrial (Nacho Vigalondo, 2011)
- I'm So Excited (Pedro Almodóvar, 2013)
- The Wishful Thinkers (Jonás Trueba, 2013)
- Stockholm (Rodrigo Sorogoyen, 2013)
- Magical Girl (Carlos Vermut, 2014)
- Beautiful Youth (Jaime Rosales, 2014)
- Truman (Cesc Gay, 2015)
- May God Save Us (Rodrigo Sorogoyen, 2016)
- The Fury of a Patient Man (Raúl Arévalo, 2016)
- Perfect Strangers (Álex de la Iglesia, 2017)
- Verónica (Paco Plaza, 2017)
- Pain and Glory (Pedro Almodóvar, 2019)
- The August Virgin (Jonás Trueba, 2019)
- The Goya Murders (Gerardo Herrero, 2019)
- The Plan (Polo Menárguez, 2019)

== 2020s ==
- The Rhythm Section (Reed Morano, 2020)
- 32 Malasana Street (Albert Pintó, 2020)
- Unknown Origins (David Galán Galindo, 2020)
- Sky High (Daniel Calparsoro, 2020)
- Sounds Like Love (Juana Macías, 2021)
- The Vault (Jaume Balagueró, 2021)
- The Grandmother (Paco Plaza, 2021)
- Venus (Jaume Balagueró, 2022)
- Manticore (Carlos Vermut, 2022)
- Ramona (Andrea Bagney, 2022)
- All the Names of God (Daniel Calparsoro, 2023)
- One Night with Adela (Hugo Ruiz, 2023)
- Something Is About to Happen (Antonio Méndez Esparza, 2023)
- Birth (Pau Teixidor, 2024)
- The Other Way Around (Jonás Trueba, 2024)
- Daniela Forever (Nacho Vigalondo, 2024)
- The Red Virgin (Paula Ortiz, 2024)
- Anathema (Jimina Sabadú, 2024)
- Goodbye Madrid (Diego Corsini, 2024)
- Ask Me What You Want (Lucía Alemany, 2024)
- Goat Girl (Ana Asensio, 2025)
- Mr. No One (Miguel Ángel Calvo Buttini, 2025)
- All in Favor (Santiago Requejo, 2025)
- The Dinner (Manuel Gómez Pereira, 2025)
- Cool Books (Andrés Salmoyraghi and Rafel López Saubidet, 2026)
- Hugo 24 (Luc Knowles, 2026)
- Dante (Hugo Ruiz, 2026)
- Sometimes Sadness, Sometimes Rebellion (María Aparicio, 2026)

== See also ==
- Comedia madrileña
- List of Spanish films
- Cinema of Spain
- European cinema
