= List of Argentine films of 2025 =

A list of Argentine-produced and co-produced feature films released or scheduled for release in Argentina in 2025. When applicable, the domestic theatrical release date is favoured.

== Films ==
Release		Title (Domestic title)	Cast & Crew	Distributor	Ref.
J A N U A R Y	9	Una muerte silenciosa	Director: Sebastián Schindel Cast: Joaquín Furriel, Soledad Villamil, Alejandro Awada, Sol Wainer, María Marull, Víctor Laplace, Gonzalo Garrido, Ramiro Pintor, Patricio Contreras, Camila Peralta, Javier Pedersoli	Star Distribution	
F E B R U A R Y	27	Biónica	Director: Sebastián Perillo Cast: Fabián Arenillas, Julia Martinez Rubio, Luciana Grasso, Santiago Pedrero.	Vi-DOC	
M A R C H	6	1978	Director: Luciano Onetti, Nicolás Onetti Cast: Agustín Pardella, Carlos Portaluppi, Mario Alarcón, Agustín Olcese, Jorge Lorenzo	3C Films	
M A R C H	6	White Roses, Fall! (¡Caigan las rosas blancas)	Director: Albertina Carri Cast: Luisa Gavasa, Carolina Alamino, Maru Marcet, Rocío Zuviría, Mijal Katzowicz	Santa Cine	
M A R C H	27	El beso de Judas	Director: Martín Murphy Cast: Alfredo Casero, Martín Campilongo, Freddy Villarreal, Adriana Salonia, Fernando Lupiz	Digicine	
A P R I L	17	Mazel Tov	Director: Adrián Suar Cast: Adrián Suar, Fernán Mirás, Natalie Pérez, Benjamín Rojas	Star Distribution	
A P R I L	24	La zurda	Director: Rosendo Ruiz Cast: Juan Cruz El Gáname, Marcio Ramsés Salas Ortuay, Alejandro Orlando, Majo Sorbello, Daniel Patiño Aguilar y Micaela Abdullatif	Cinetren	
M A Y	1	Mensaje en una botella	Director: Gabriel Nesci Cast: Luisana Lopilato, Benjamín Vicuña, Benjamín Amadeo, Luciano Cáceres, Rafael Spregelburd, Marina Bellati, Valeria Lois, Belén Chavanne	Digicine	
M A Y	1	Thesis on a Domestication (Tesis sobre una domesticación)	Director: Javier van De Couter Cast: Camila Sosa Villada, Alfonso Herrera, Carlos Cano, Romina Escobar, Ignacio Ferrechio	Cinetren	
M A Y	30	The Heart Knows (Corazón delator)	Director: Marcos Carnevale Cast: Benjamín Vicuña, Julieta Díaz	Netflix	
J U N E	5	La quinta	Director: Silvina Schnicer Cast: Valentín Salaverry, Milo Lis, Emma Cetrangolo, Cecilia Rainero, Sebastián Arzeno	—N/a	
J U L Y	17	El novio de mamá	Director: Nicolás Silbert, Leandro Mark Cast: José María Listorti, Daniela Viaggiamari, Francina Di Carlo, Fausto Fallesen, Jorgelina Aruzzi, Alex Pelao, Jerónimo Freixas, Facha Espi	Star Distribution	
A U G U S T	14	Homo Sapiens? (Homo Argentum)	Director: Gastón Duprat & Mariano Cohn Cast: Guillermo Francella	Star Distribution	
A U G U S T	28	Goodbye Madrid (Adiós Madrid)	Director: Diego Corsini Cast: Luciano Cáceres, Javier Godino, Fariba Sheikhan, Mónica Solaun, Ramón Esquinas, Sara Vega, Ingrid Rubio	3C Films	
S E P T E M B E R	4	The Woman in the Line (La mujer de la fila)	Director: Benjamin Ávila Cast: Natalia Oreiro, Alberto Ammann	Moving Pics	
S E P T E M B E R	11	Surfacing (La llegada del hijo)	Director: Cecilia Atán, Valeria Pivato Cast: Maricel Álvarez, Angelo Mutti Spinetta, Cristina Banegas, Greta Fernández	Cinetren	
S E P T E M B E R	18	Belén	Director: Dolores Fonzi Cast: Dolores Fonzi, Camila Plaate, Laura Paredes, Julieta Cardinali, Sergio Prina, Luis Machín, César Troncoso, Lili Juárez	Digicine	
S E P T E M B E R	18	Papa x dos	Director: Hernán Guerschuny Cast: Benjamín Vicuña, Celeste Cid, Lucas Akoskin, María Gracia Omegna	BF Paris	
O C T O B E R	2	Queen of Coal (Miss Carbón)	Director: Agustina Macri Cast: Lux Pascal, Laura Grandinetti, Romina Escobar, Paco León, Agostina Inella, Jorge Román, Santiago Loy, Simone Mercado	Moving Pics	
O C T O B E R	9	La noche sin mí	Director: María Laura Berch, Laura Chiabrando Cast: Natalia Oreiro, Pablo Cura, Matilde Creimer Chiabrando, Teo Inama Chiabrando	Cinetren	
O C T O B E R	16	El retorno	Director: Marcela Luchetta Cast: Franco Masini, Gabriel Gallicchio, Luis Gnecco, Juanjo Puigcorbé, Miriam Giovanelli, Mariano Saborido, Elvira Onetto, Giampaolo Samá	Digicine	
O C T O B E R	23	The Reborn (Los renacidos)	Director: Santiago Esteves Cast: Pedro Fontaine, Marco Antonio Caponi, Óscar de la Fuente, Verónica Gerez	Cinetren	
N O V E M B E R	13	The Currents (Las corrientes)	Director: Milagros Mumenthaler Cast: Isabel Aimé González Solá, Esteban Bigliardi, Jazmín Carballo	Cinetren	
N O V E M B E R	20	Death of a Comedian (La muerte de un comediante)	Director: Diego Peretti, Javier Beltramino Cast: Diego Peretti, Malena Villa	Moving Pics	
D E C E M B E R	11	Los ojos del abismo	Director: Daniel de la Vega Cast: Verónica Intile, Carolina Alfonsín, Kevin Schiele, Raymond Lee, Cristian Mariani, Pablo Turturiello, Gustavo Pardi	3C Films	
D E C E M B E R	11	Desbarrancada	Director: Cast: Carla Pandolfi, Pepe Monje	—N/a	
D E C E M B E R	11	Tres tiempos	Director: Marlene Grinberg Cast: Mara Bestelli, Florencia Dyszel, Violeta Postolski, Fernando Contigiani	—N/a	

== Box office ==
The ten most watched Argentine films in 2025, by domestic admissions, were as follows:

Most watched films of 2025
Rank	Title	Distributor	Admissions
1	Homo Sapiens? (Homo Argentum)	Star Distribution	1,803,592
2	Mazel Tov	Star Distribution	357,016
3	Belén	Digicine	135,950
4	El novio de mamá	Star Distribution	75,007
5	Una muerte silenciosa	Star Distribution	46,039
6	The Woman in the Line (La mujer de la fila)	Moving Pics	29,543
7	1978	3C Films	22,671
8	Thesis on a Domestication (Tesis sobre una domesticación)	Cinetren	17,483
9	Death of a Comedian (La muerte de un comediante)	Moving Pics	16,050
10	Mensaje en una botella	Digicine	13,939
