= Vito Sanz =

Spanish actor (born 1982)

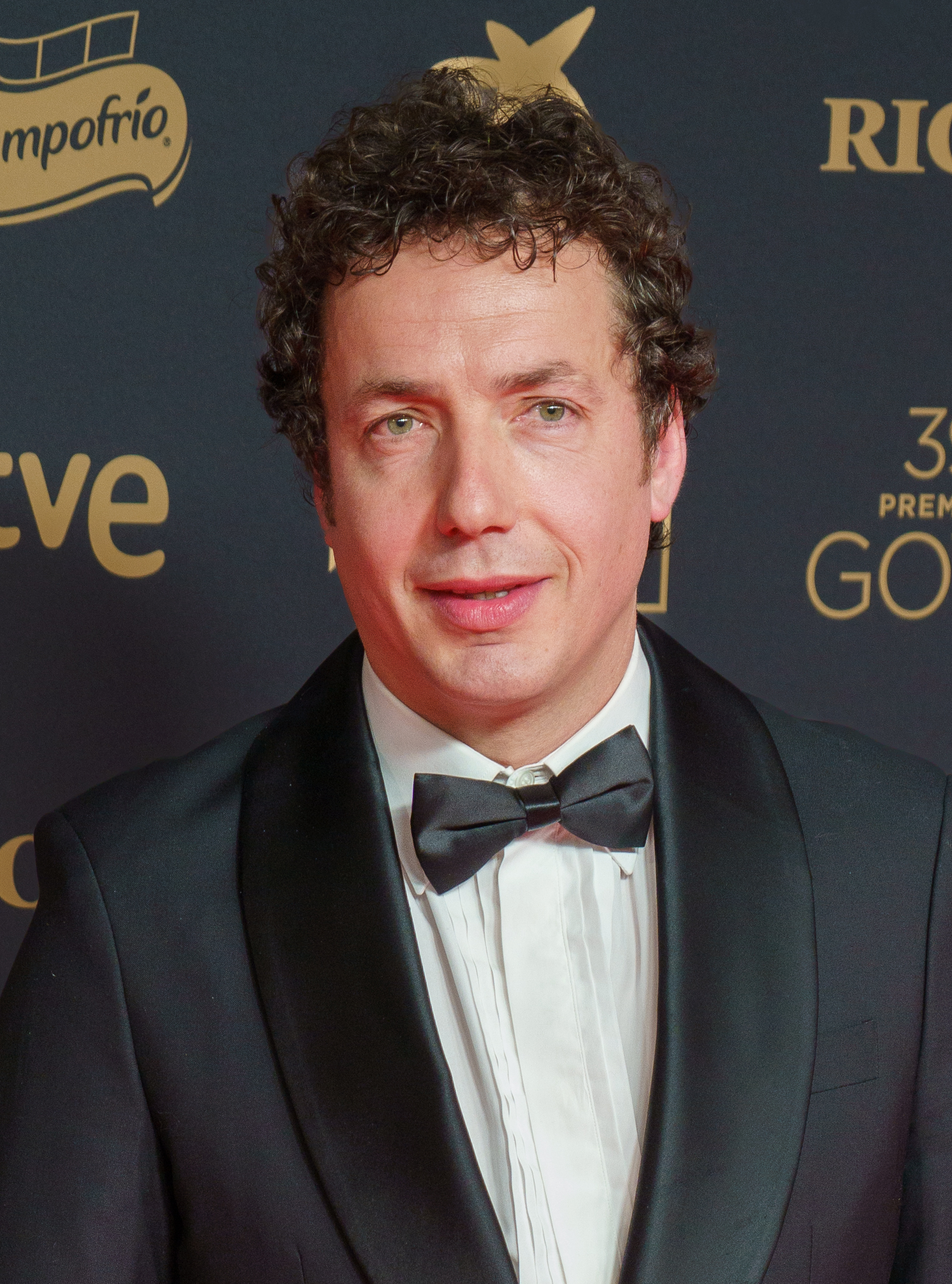
- Sanz in 2025
- Born: 1982 (age 42–43); Huesca, Aragon, Spain
- Occupation: Actor

Vito Sanz (born 1982) is a Spanish actor. He is a recurring collaborator of Jonás Trueba.

== Life and career ==
Vito Sanz was born in Huesca in 1982. He studied dramatic art in Barcelona and then moved to Madrid, where he has been based for over 15 years. He landed his first main film role in Jonás Trueba's The Wishful Thinkers (2013). He has since featured in other Trueba's films, namely The Romantic Exiles, The August Virgin, You Have to Come and See It, and The Other Way Around, which he also co-wrote and for which he won a nomination for the Goya Award for Best Actor. He has also worked with other members of the Trueba family such as David (Almost 40, A este lado del mundo, El hombre bueno) and Fernando (The Queen of Spain).

His non-Trueba filmography includes credits in films such as María (and Everybody Else), Hacerse mayor y otros problemas, Disco, Ibiza, Locomía, Myocardium, and series such as Vergüenza and The Minions of Midas.

== Accolades ==
Year	Award	Category	Work	Result	Ref.
2018	27th Actors and Actresses Union Awards	Best Television Actor in a Secondary Role	Vergüenza	Nominated	
2025	39th Goya Awards	Best Actor	The Other Way Around	Nominated	
