= Mazel Tov (film) =

- Theatrical release poster
- Directed by: Adrián Suar
- Screenplay by: Pablo Solarz
- Produced by: Adrián Suar; Diego Andrasnik; Juan Lovece
- Starring: Adrián Suar; Fernán Mirás; Natalie Pérez; Benjamín Rojas
- Cinematography: Guillermo Nieto
- Edited by: Alejandro Parysow
- Music by: Nicolás Sorín
- Production companies: Tolmur; Preludio Producciones
- Distributed by: Star Distribution
- Release date: 14 January 2025
- Running time: 97 minutes
- Country: Argentina
- Language: Spanish

Mazel Tov is a 2025 Argentine comedy-drama film directed by Adrián Suar. It tells the story of the complicated bond between four siblings whose relationship is further affected by the death of their father. The film stars Suar, Fernán Mirás, Natalie Pérez, and Benjamín Rojas. It had its world premiere on January 14, 2025, at the Miami Jewish Film Festival, while its commercial release in Argentine movie theaters was on April 17, 2025.

== Plot ==
It follows the life of Darío Roitman, a man who has lived in the United States for a long time, far from his entire family in Argentina. However, one day he decides to return to his home country to attend his sister Daniela's wedding and his niece's bat mitzvah. During his return, Darío receives the news that his father, Salomón, has died, which complicates Daniela's wedding plans. The relationship with his other siblings becomes increasingly intense as old conflicts resurface and new ones arise, such as the inheritance.

== Cast ==
- Adrián Suar as Darío Roitman
- Fernán Mirás as Gabriel Roitman
- Natalie Pérez as Daniela Roitman
- Benjamín Rojas as Guido Roitman
- Alberto Ajaka as "Negro"
- Lorena Vega as Valeria
- Guillermo Arengo as Damián
- Esteban Bigliardi as Ariel Rosemberg
- Ariadna Asturzzi as Ingrid Rosemberg
- Lucila Mangone as Judith
- Pablo Fábregas as David González
- Aarón Palomino as Santiago Roitman
- Adriana Aizemberg as Tía Shoshi
- Rodolfo Ranni as León Rosemberg
- Uma Burcaizea Eidelman as Irina Roitman
- Lucía Luna Li as Masami

== Reception ==
=== Critical response ===
The film received favorable reviews from the press. Juan Pablo Cinelli from Página 12 highlighted that "among its virtues, Mazel Tov has the effectiveness of a cast where everyone performs their roles efficiently, giving the protagonist a secure framework to move within." However, he questioned that "Suar indulges in excesses that at this point must be considered deliberate and conscious." Leonardo D'Esposito from La Nación stated that "it is likely that Mazel Tov is the best [Suar] has achieved as a producer, actor, and director [...] because it exudes sincerity and his character [...] looks at his flaws head-on and without shame."

In a review for La Voz del Interior, Jesús Rubio wrote, "Adrián Suar must be recognized for his great talent for comedy: he's funny and knows how to compose those verbose characters who always mess up, like few others can." He concluded by saying that "Mazel Tov is narrated with a pleasant and classic style, and with a dramatic comedic tone that has a long tradition in Argentine cinema, in addition to leaving a much-needed lesson." Pablo O. Scholz of Clarín noted that the film is "a dramatic comedy that makes the necessary shifts when it is too much of a comedy to turn to drama, and vice versa."

=== Box office ===
In its first week of release, the film sold 116,329 tickets in the 292 movie theaters in Argentina where it premiered. This made it the most successful Argentine film of 2025, surpassing Una muerte silenciosa and 1978. Overall, it was the second most-watched film of the first week of April, ranking just behind A Minecraft Movie. During its second week, Mazel Tov was seen by 65,010 viewers, which increased its total to 206,944 tickets sold, and it was once again the second most-watched film of that period.

== See also ==
- List of Argentine films of 2025
