= Toulouse Spanish Film Festival =

Annual film festival held in Toulouse, France

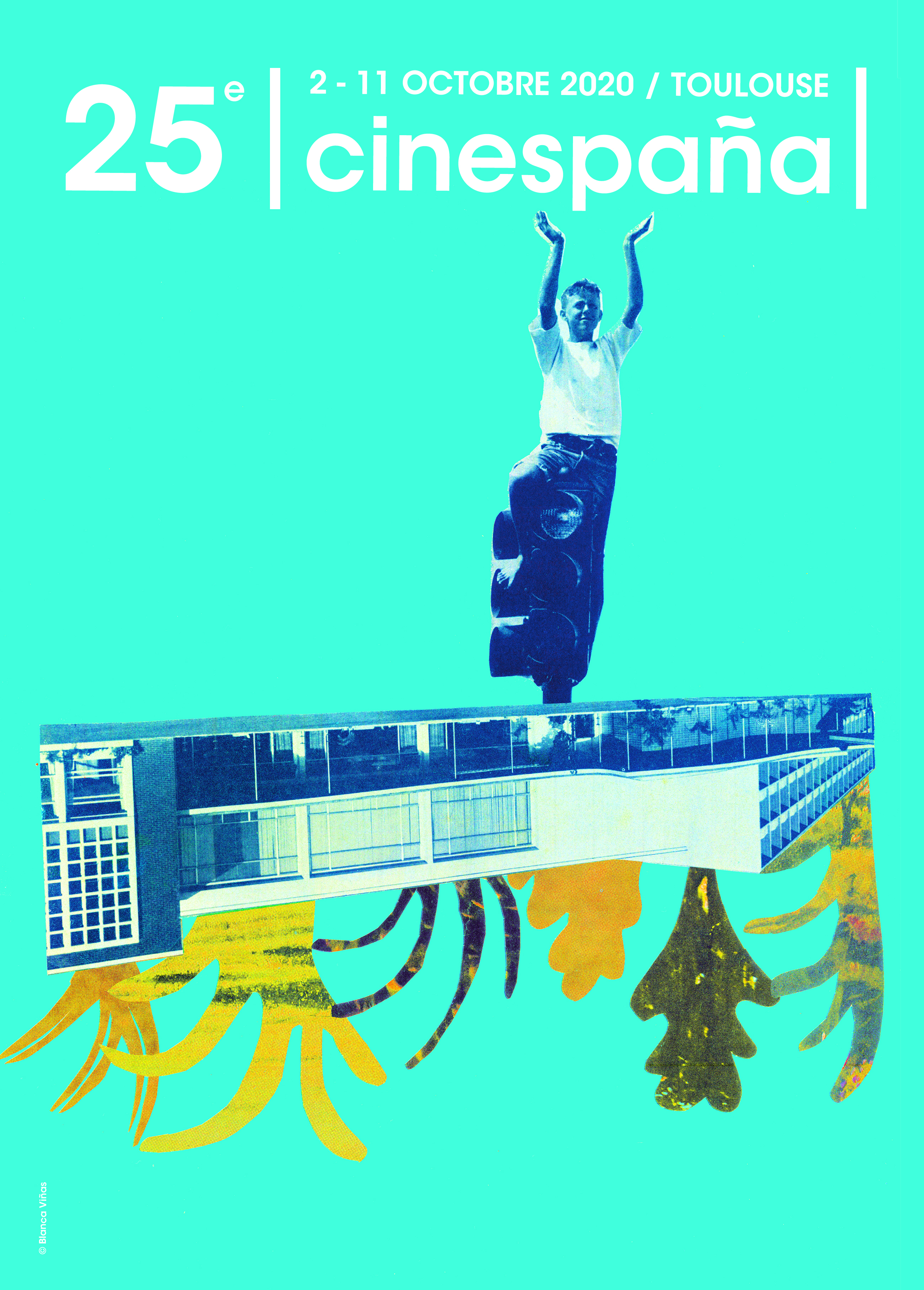
- 25th Toulouse Spanish Film Festival - Cinespaña 2020
- Location: Toulouse, France
- Founded: 1996; 30 years ago
- Awards: Golden Violet for Best Film
- Website: www.cinespagnol.com

The Toulouse Spanish Film Festival (French: Festival du Film Espagnol de Toulouse; Spanish: Festival de Cine Español de Toulouse), also known as Cinespaña, is an annual film festival held in Toulouse, France, which specialises in Spanish cinema. The festival awards the Golden Violet (Violette d'Or; Violeta de Oro), for the best full-length film from Spain previously unreleased in France. The festival is usually held in October.

The festival was established in 1996, as the successor to the Les écrans de l'histoire film festival. The 1996 festival was focussed on the Spanish Civil War, with later festivals showcasing Spanish cinema in general. The festival is supported by the Spanish government bodies Instituto de la Cinematografía y de las Artes Audiovisuales (ICAA) and Instituto Cervantes.

Since 1997, the festival's main competition has presented full-length films from Spain previously unreleased in France, which compete for the Golden Violet award. There are also awards for best director, actress, actor, screenplay, score, and cinematography.

== Golden Violet winning films ==
| Year of award | Original title | Original language | English title | Director |
|---|---|---|---|---|
| 1997 | Tranvía a la Malvarrosa | Spanish | Tramway to Malvarrosa | José Luis García Sánchez |
| 1998 | Sus ojos se cerraron y el mundo sigue andando | Spanish | Tangos Are for Two | Jaime Chávarri |
| 1999 | Los lobos de Washington | Spanish | Washington Wolves | Mariano Barroso |
| 2000 | Cascabel | Spanish | | Daniel Cebrián |
| 2002 | En la ciudad sin límites | Spanish | In the City Without Limits | Antonio Hernández |
| 2003 | Torremolinos 73 | Spanish, Danish | | Pablo Berger |
| 2004 | Cachorro | Spanish | Bear Club | Miguel Albaladejo |
| 2005 | Roma | Spanish | | Adolfo Aristarain |
| 2006 | Azuloscurocasinegro | Spanish | Dark Blue Almost Black | Daniel Sánchez Arévalo |
| 2007 | La caja | Spanish | The Wooden Box | Juan Carlos Falcón |
| 2008 | Todos estamos invitados | Spanish | | Manuel Gutiérrez Aragón |
| 2009 | Ander | Basque, Spanish | | Roberto Castón |
| 2010 | La mujer sin piano | Spanish | Woman Without Piano | Javier Rebollo |
| 2011 | Crebinsky | Galician | | Enrique Otero |
| 2012 | El muerto y ser feliz | Spanish | | Javier Rebollo |
| 2013 | Los ilusos | Spanish | The Wishful Thinkers | Jonás Trueba |
| 2014 | Ärtico | Spanish | | Gabriel Velázquez |
| 2015 | A cambio de nada | Spanish | Nothing in Return | Daniel Guzmán |
| 2016 | La reconquista | Spanish | The Reconquest | Jonás Trueba |
| 2017 | Vivir y otras ficciones | Spanish | | Jo Sol |
| 2018 | Carmen y Lola | Spanish | Carmen & Lola | Arantxa Echevarría |
| 2019 | Entre dos aguas | Spanish | Between Two Waters | Isaki Lacuesta |
| 2020 | Lúa vermella | Galician | | Lois Patiño |
| 2021 | Destello bravío | Spanish | | Ainhoa Rodríguez |
| 2023 | Mantícora | Spanish | Manticore | Carlos Vermut |
| 2024 | La estrella azul | Spanish | The Blue Star | Javier Macipe |
| 2025 | Quan un riu esdevé el mar | Catalan | When a River Becomes the Sea | Pere Vilà Barceló |
| 2026 | Yo no moriré de amor | | I Won't Die for Love | Marta Matute |
