= The Girls Are Alright =

- Theatrical release poster
- Spanish: Las chicas están bien
- Directed by: Itsaso Arana
- Screenplay by: Itsaso Arana
- Produced by: Itsaso Arana; Javier Lafuente; Jonás Trueba
- Starring: Bárbara Lennie; Irene Escolar; Itziar Manero; Helena Ezquerro; Itsaso Arana
- Cinematography: Sara Gallego
- Edited by: Marta Velasco
- Music by: Keith Jarrett; Niño Josele
- Production company: Los ilusos films
- Distributed by: Elastica
- Release dates: 1 July 2023 (Karlovy Vary); 25 August 2023 (Spain)
- Country: Spain
- Language: Spanish

The Girls Are Alright (Spanish: Las chicas están bien) is a 2023 Spanish drama film written and directed by Itsaso Arana in her directorial debut film. It stars Arana, Bárbara Lennie, Irene Escolar, Itziar Manero, and Helena Ezquerro.

== Plot ==
Set in Summer, the plot follows four actresses and one writer rehearsing a stage play in an old mill.

== Cast ==
- Itsaso Arana as Itsaso
- Bárbara Lennie as Barbara
- Irene Escolar as Irene
- Helena Ezquerro as Helena
- Itziar Manero as Itziar

== Production ==
Shooting took place in a mill in Nistal de la Vega, province of León. Sara Gallego lensed the film.

== Release ==
The film made it to the main slate of the 57th Karlovy Vary International Film Festival, in the Crystal Globe competition. Distributed by Elastica, the film was released theatrically in Spain on 25 August 2023. Filmin scooped video on demand rights to the film. The Girls Are Alright also screened at the 20th Santiago International Film Festival in August 2024.

== Reception ==
On the review aggregator website Rotten Tomatoes, 100% of 10 critics' reviews are positive, with an average rating of 7.40/10.

Wendy Ide of ScreenDaily wrote that "beguiling, tactile and intimate, [The Girls Are Alright] is a delightful film that revels in its femininity".

Guy Lodge of Variety deemed the film to be a "short, sweet, winsome freshman feature".

Irene Crespo of Cinemanía rated the film 4 out of 5 stars, deeming it to be a "luminous celebration of female friendship".

=== Top ten lists ===
The film also appeared on a number of critics' top ten lists of the best Spanish films of 2023:

- 3rd — El Cultural (critics)
- 5th — El Confidencial (consensus)
- 9th — El Español (Series & Más consensus)

== Accolades ==
Year	Award	Category	Nominee(s)	Result	Ref.
2024	11th Feroz Awards	Best Comedy Film		Nominated	
2024	38th Goya Awards	Best New Director	Itsaso Arana	Nominated	
2024	7th ALMA Awards	Best Screenplay in a Comedy Film	Itsaso Arana	Nominated	

== See also ==
- List of Spanish films of 2023
