= Ramona (2022 film) =

- Film poster
- Directed by: Andrea Bagney
- Written by: Andrea Bagney
- Produced by: Sergio Uguet de Resayre
- Starring: Lourdes Hernández; Bruno Lastra; Francesco Carril
- Cinematography: Pol Orpinell
- Edited by: Pablo Barce
- Production company: Tortilla Films
- Distributed by: Filmin
- Release dates: July 2022 (Karlovy Vary); 25 November 2022 (Spain)
- Country: Spain
- Language: Spanish

Ramona is a 2022 Spanish independent comedy film written and directed by Andrea Bagney in her feature film directorial debut which stars Lourdes Hernández as the title character alongside Bruno Lastra and Francesco Carril. It is primarily shot in black and white.

== Plot ==
Set in Madrid, the plot follows Ramona, who has returned to Madrid from London after years abroad, and tries her luck as an actress. The plot then tracks the love triangle formed by Ramona, Bruno (the director of the film she has auditioned for) and Ramona's longtime boyfriend Nico.

== Cast ==
- Lourdes Hernández as Ramona
- Bruno Lastra as Bruno
- Francesco Carril as Nico

== Production ==
A Tortilla Films production, Ramona was written by the helmer Andrea Bagney. Pol Orpinell worked as cinematographer. Filming began in Madrid on 29 April 2021. Shot in black and white, the film goes full color in the segments in which the title character (a wannabe actress) is being filmed.

== Release ==
The film had its world premiere in July 2022 at the 56th Karlovy Vary International Film Festival, selected in the festival's 'Proxima' slate. Filmin acquired the Spanish rights to the film whereas Best Friend Forever handled the international sales. It was theatrically released in Spain on 25 November 2022, followed by a December 2022 streaming release on Filmin.

== Reception ==
According to the American review aggregation website Rotten Tomatoes, Ramona has a 100% approval rating based on 5 reviews from critics, with an average rating of 8.0/10.

Jonathan Holland of ScreenDaily considered that Hernández "is always an engrossing presence in a role that demands a variety of registers", otherwise pointing out that "the spirit of the French New Wave lives on" Bagney's debut film, finding stylistic affinities between the helmer and Jonás Trueba.

Anna Smith of Deadline Hollywood deemed the film to be "a sharp, urban character portrait with a relationship that may or may not be romantic, yet engages to the end", singling out Hernández and Bagney as talents to follow.

== Accolades ==
| Year | Award | Category | Nominee(s) | Result | Ref. |
|---|---|---|---|---|---|
| 2022 | 17th Rome Film Festival | Best Screenplay | Andrea Bagney | Won | |
| 2022 | 17th Rome Film Festival | 'Ugo Tognazzi' Award | | Won | |

== See also ==
- List of Spanish films of 2022
