= Russian Red =

Spanish singer-songwriter

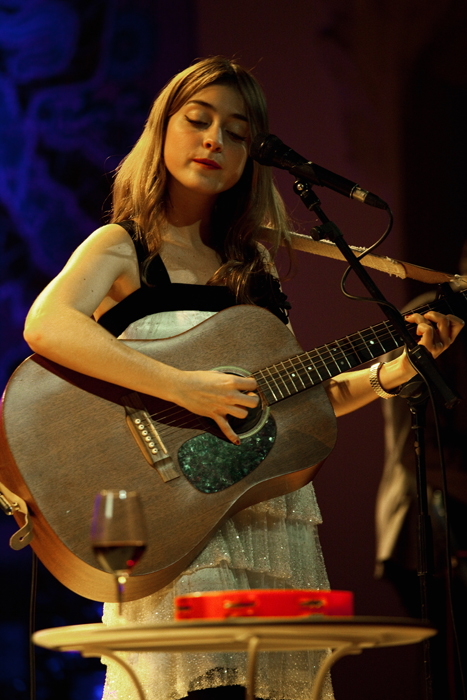
- Russian Red in 2009

Background information
- Born: Lourdes Hernández González; 20 November 1985 (age 40)
- Origin: Madrid, Spain
- Genres: Indie; folk
- Occupation: Singer-songwriter
- Instruments: Vocals; guitar
- Years active: 2007–present
- Labels: Octubre; Sony Music Entertainment
- Website: www.russianred.com

Lourdes Hernández González (born 20 November 1985), known professionally as Russian Red, is a Spanish indie and folk singer-songwriter.

== Life and career ==
Hernández is from Madrid, but writes and sings in English; she has said that she instinctively sings in English because she has always listened to music in English. She has been compared to the Canadian singer-songwriter Feist. She took her professional name from her preferred MAC lipstick color.

She began playing guitar in the Madrid Metro at the age of 21, while a law student. Her career took off after she met Brian Hunt, a musician with an English father and Spanish mother, with whom she recorded a demo that by 2008 had reached more than 70,000 visits on her MySpace page. In 2007 she performed more than 60 shows and took part in the prestigious Primavera Sound, among other festivals; by mid-2008 she had become well known in the Spanish indie scene.

She recorded her first album, I Love Your Glasses (2008) on Spanish label Eureka at the request of its owner, Fernando Vacas. The album was successful; a columnist in El País dubbed Russian Red the "revelation of the year".

After signing in late 2010 with Octubre, the music label of Sony Music Spain, Russian Red released her second album, Fuerteventura, in May 2011. Fuerteventura was recorded in Glasgow, with members of Belle and Sebastian and their producer Tony Doogan. Following the release of the album, she promoted it throughout Spain with presentations and concerts in major cities and appearances at the major summer festivals. She then toured in Asia, including Taiwan, where she achieved great success. After a break in December 2011, she resumed touring in Europe and Asia with a new concert format, accompanied by Hunt and Pablo Serrano; Serrano was later replaced by Juan Diego "Juandi" Gosálvez, and in late 2012 the three also performed five concerts as a tribute to the Beatles, with Alex Ferreira as bassist and vocalist in one of the songs.

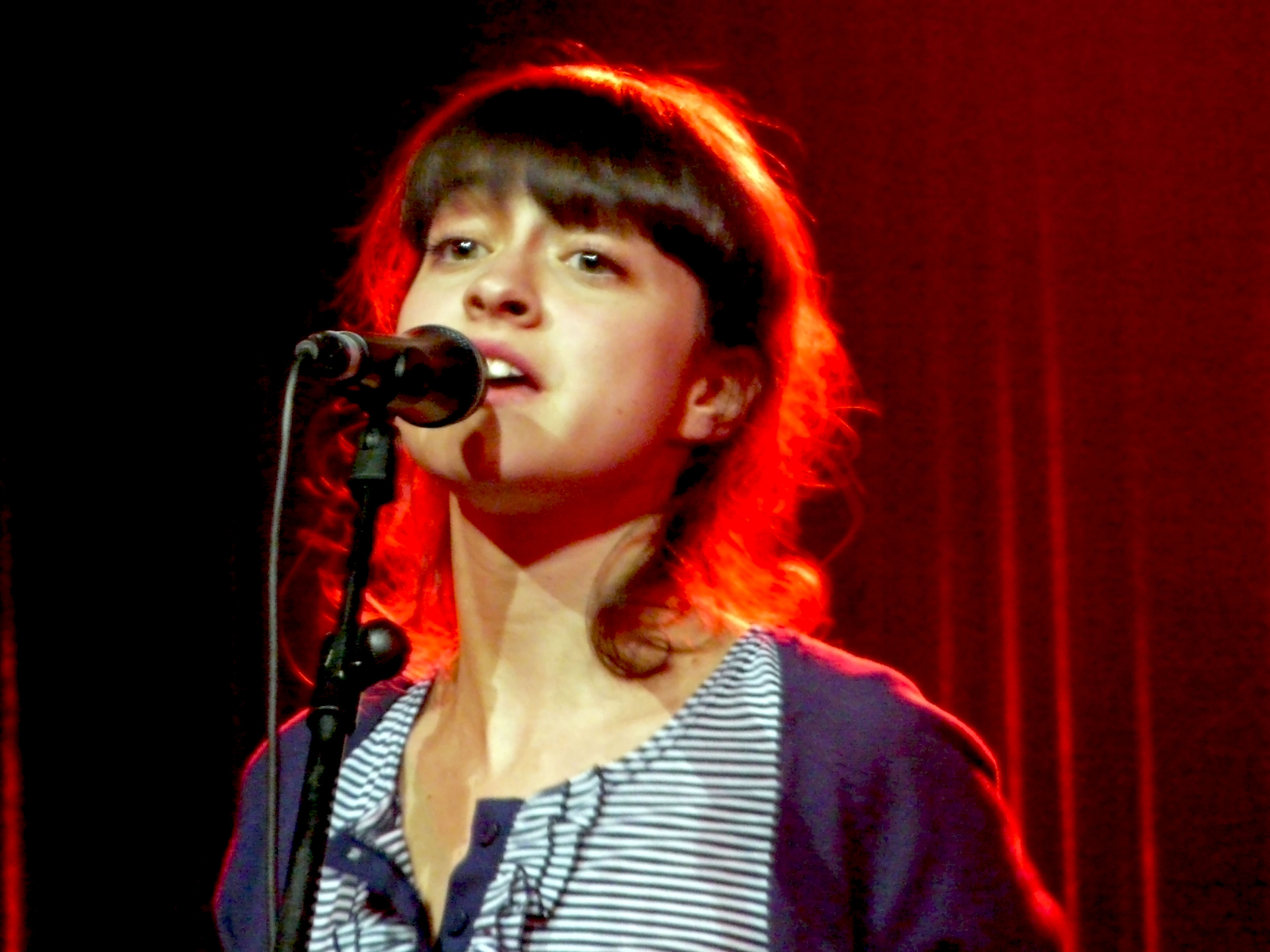
Russian Red in 2008

During this period, Russian Red also recorded a duet with Elvis Presley of his song "Love Me Tender" in the special Spanish edition of the album Viva Elvis, released in late 2010. In October 2011 she covered the Leonard Cohen song "So Long, Marianne" as a tribute to him, and she was the voice of Mérida on the Castilian Spanish version of the soundtrack of the 2012 Disney / Pixar film Brave.

Her move to a major label disappointed some of her indie fans, and there were rumors that she was in a relationship with soccer player Xabi Alonso, who was married. In 2013, she moved to Los Angeles, where in 2016 she married architect and musician Zack Leigh. The couple subsequently converted the church in which they had married into a residence and wedding venue. With Leigh and his brother Aaron, she formed the group Babes.

She recorded her third studio album, Agent Cooper, at Sunset Studios. It was produced by Joe Chiccarelli, mixed by Mark Needham, and engineered by Emily Lazar. It was released in 2014; during the promotional tour, she walked off-stage in Seattle and canceled the rest of the tour.

Her fourth album, Karaoke, was released in 2017. It includes covers of songs from the 1980s and 1990s; the Leighs and Hunt participated, with sound engineer David Greenbaum. At this time she began going by "Lourdes".

In 2015, she made her acting debut with Carlos Troya in El beso, a crowd-funded short film directed by David Priego. In late 2022, she starred in Ramona, a Spanish comedy feature film.

In 2019, she composed and performed the music for a production by the Los Angeles dance group Ate9 titled a blind LAdy. After a long recording hiatus, she released the single "This is un volcán" in August 2023.

== Personal life ==
Lourdes Hernández lives in the Los Feliz neighborhood of Los Angeles with her husband, architect Zach Leigh and their dog Chula.

== Discography ==
=== Albums ===
- I Love Your Glasses (2008)
- Fuerteventura (2011)
- Agent Cooper (2014)
- Karaoke (2017)
- Volverme a Enamorar (2024)

=== Singles ===
- "They Don't Believe" (2008)
- "Cigarettes" (2008)
- "Perfect Time" (2008)
- "I Hate You But I Love You" (2011)
- "The Sun, The Trees" (2011)
- "Everyday Everynight" (2012)
- "My Love Is Gone" (2012)
- "Casper" (2014)
- "John Michael" (2014)
- "Michael P" (2014)
- "This is un volcán" (2023)
- "No entiendo nada" (2024)

== Awards ==
- Best debut album, Premios Pop-Eye 2008 (I Love Your Glasses)
- MTV Europe Music Award for Best Spanish Act, 2011
- Medal of the Community of Madrid in silver, May 2, 2012, in recognition of her work
