= Disforia =

- Directed by: Christopher Cartagena
- Written by: Christopher Cartagena; Joan-Pol Argenter; Imanol Ortiz
- Based on: Disforia by David Jasso
- Produced by: Isabel G. Peralta; Pablo López Torres; Christopher Cartagena
- Starring: Fariba Sheikhan; Claudia Salas; Noah Casas; Eloy Azorín
- Cinematography: Jorge Roig
- Edited by: Juan Manuel Gamazo; Clara Martínez Malagelada
- Music by: Alberto Torres
- Production companies: Aliwood Mediterráneo Producciones; Robot Productions
- Release date: 20 September 2025 (Fantastic Fest)
- Country: Spain
- Language: Spanish

Disforia is a 2025 Spanish psychological horror film directed by Christopher Cartagena based on the novel by David Jasso. It stars Fariba Sheikhan and Claudia Salas.

== Plot ==
Set in the near future against the backdrop of widespread looting and societal collapse, the couple formed by Esther and Tomás and their daughter Say move to their summer house so they can promptly sell it and then flee from their country to France, drawing attention from a ring of voyeurs of real-life torture streamed on the dark web.

== Cast ==
- Fariba Sheikhan as Esther
- Eloy Azorín as Tomás
- Noah Casas as Say
- Claudia Salas as Vera
- Ferran Vilajosana
- Kike Guaza
- Aleida Torrent

== Production ==
The film was produced by Aliwood Mediterráneo Producciones along with Robot Productions. Shooting locations included El Espinar and Pozuelo de Alarcón. The film was lensed by Jorge Roig.

== Release ==
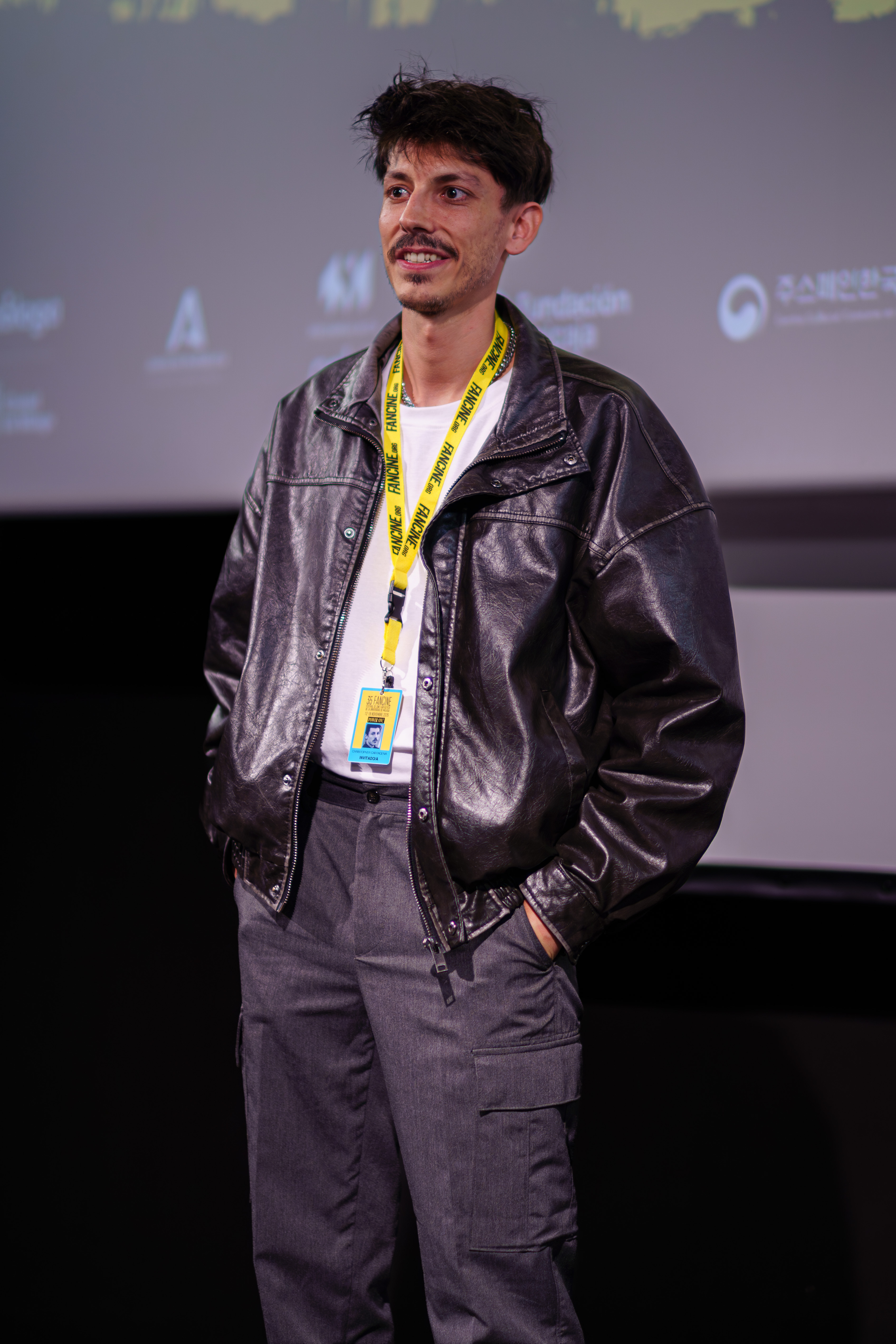
Cartagena attending the Málaga-based Fancine 2025

Disforia was set to have its world premiere at the 20th Fantastic Fest on 20 September 2025. It was also added to the lineups of the 18th Strasbourg European Fantastic Film Festival and the Melbourne-based Monster Fest 2025. Cercamon's genre label Vorteks acquired sales rights to the film.

== See also ==
- List of Spanish films of 2025
