= The Other Way Around =

- Theatrical release poster
- Spanish: Volveréis
- Directed by: Jonás Trueba
- Screenplay by: Jonás Trueba; Itsaso Arana; Vito Sanz
- Produced by: Jonás Trueba; Javier Lafuente
- Starring: Itsaso Arana; Vito Sanz
- Cinematography: Santiago Racaj
- Edited by: Marta Velasco
- Music by: Iman Amar; Ana Valladares; Guillermo Briales
- Production companies: Los Ilusos Films; Les Films du Worso
- Distributed by: Elastica (es); Arizona Distribution (fr)
- Release dates: 20 May 2024 (Cannes); 28 August 2024 (France); 30 August 2024 (Spain)
- Running time: 113 minutes
- Countries: Spain; France
- Language: Spanish

The Other Way Around (Spanish: Volveréis; titled Septembre sans attendre for the French market) is a 2024 comedy film directed by Jonás Trueba, who also wrote it in tandem with stars Itsaso Arana and Vito Sanz.

The film had its world premiere in the Directors' Fortnight sidebar section of the 77th Cannes Film Festival on 20 May 2024, where it won the Europa Cinemas Label Award. It was theatrically released in Spain by Elastica Films on 30 August.

== Plot ==
The plot is set in Madrid. A couple formed by actor Alex and filmmaker Ale throws a party to announce their breakup after 15 years of relationship, but none of their close ones believes them.

== Cast ==
- Itsaso Arana as Ale
- Vito Sanz as Alex
- Fernando Trueba
- Jon Viar
- Andrés Gertrúdix
- Ana Risueño
- Francesco Carril
- Isabelle Stoffel
- Sigfrid Monleón

== Production ==
The Other Way Around is a Spanish-French co-production by Los Ilusos Films, Les Films du Worso and Arte France Cinéma. Shooting locations included Madrid.

== Release ==
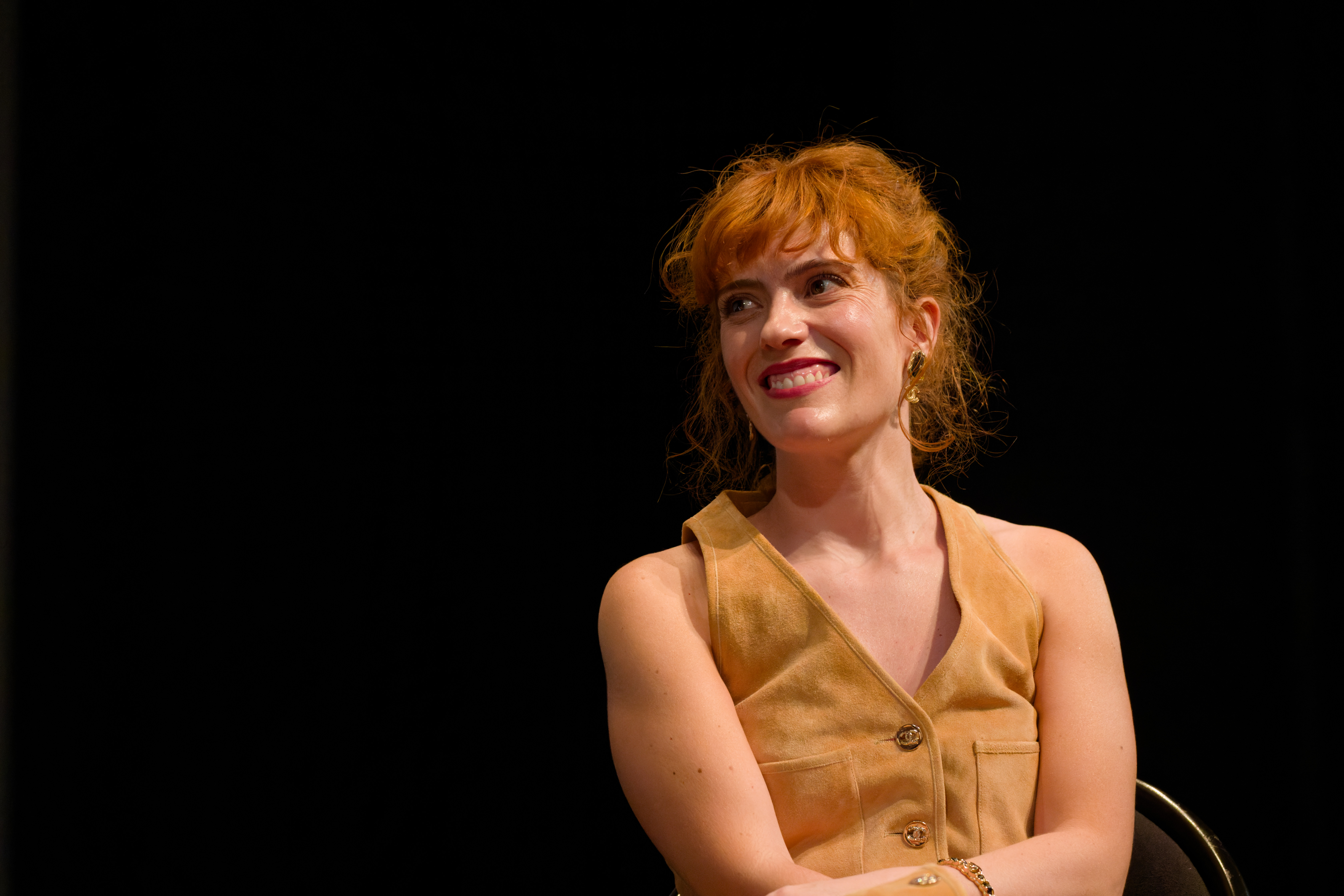
Arana during the presentation of the film at Cannes

The film had its world premiere in the Directors' Fortnight sidebar section of the 77th Cannes Film Festival on 20 May 2024. It also made it to the competitive slate of the 38th Cabourg Film Festival, and to the 'Laugh' strand of the 2024 BFI London Film Festival.

Distributed by Elastica, it was released theatrically in Spain on 30 August 2024. Arizona Distribution released the film in France on 28 August 2024.

The film also sold to Italy (Wanted Cinema) Germany (Piffl Medien), Austria (Panda Lichtspiele Filmverleih), Benelux (Vedette), Portugal (Leopardo), Greece (Rosebud), Poland (New Horizons), China (Hugoeast), the Baltics (Kino Pavasaris), ex-Yugoslavia (Discovery), and Indonesia (PT Falcon).

== Reception ==
On the review aggregator website Rotten Tomatoes, 92% of 24 critics' reviews are positive, with an average rating of 7.2/10.

Adam Solomons of IndieWire gave the film a 'B' rating, considering it "a refreshingly grown-up entry to a genre that seems to have got sillier and blander in recent years".

Reviewing for the International Cinephile Society, Alonso Aguilar rated the film 4 out of 5 stars, deeming it to be "a genuine attempt to capture something ephemeral, and try to frame it in all ways possible, before finally surrendering to its fleeting beauty".

Jonathan Holland of ScreenDaily wrote that Trueba "continues to satisfy film buffs with plenty of fun self-referential elements, designed to appeal to purists".

Luis Martínez of El Mundo gave the film 4 stars, deeming it to be "a rare miracle of the poetics of everyday [life]".

Jessica Kiang of Variety billed the film as "a delightful showcase for the Spanish director's lithe, airy style, here accented with glistening strands of Madrileño meta-melancholy".

María Bescós of HobbyConsolas gave the film 73 points ('good') highlighting "how well the meta-cinema is inserted into the story" as a positive point while mentioning that her biggest 'but' to the film was its reiteration.

Marta Medina of El Confidencial rated The Other Way Around 5 out of 5 stars, writing that the film "resists the idea of melodramatism as the only valid model of love, and proposes the beauty of small convergences, of recognising oneself in the other".

== Accolades ==
Year	Award	Category	Nominee(s)	Result	Ref.
2024	77th Cannes Film Festival	Europa Cinemas Label Award for Best European Film (Directors' Fortnight)	Jonás Trueba	Won	
2024	39th Guadalajara International Film Festival	Best Ibero-American Fiction Feature Film	The Other Way Around	Nominated	
2024	39th Guadalajara International Film Festival	Best Ibero-American Fiction Feature Film – Special Mention	The Other Way Around	Won	
2025	12th Feroz Awards	Best Comedy Film	The Other Way Around	Nominated	
2025	30th Lumière Awards	Best International Co-Production	The Other Way Around	Nominated	
2025	39th Goya Awards	Best Actor	Vito Sanz	Nominated	
2025	39th Goya Awards	Best Art Direction	Miguel Ángel Rebollo	Nominated	
2025	8th ALMA Awards	Best Screenplay in a Comedy Film	Itsaso Arana, Vito Sanz, Jonás Trueba	Nominated	

== See also ==
- List of Spanish films of 2024
- List of French films of 2024
