= The Cliff (film) =

- Theatrical release poster
- Spanish: Acantilado
- Directed by: Helena Taberna
- Screenplay by: Helena Taberna; Andrés Martorell; Natxo López
- Based on: El contenido del silencio by Lucía Etxebarria
- Produced by: Helena Taberna; Iker Ganuza
- Starring: Goya Toledo; Daniel Grao; Juana Acosta; Ingrid García-Jonsson; Jon Kortajarena
- Cinematography: Javier Agirre
- Edited by: Teresa Font
- Music by: Ángel Illarramendi
- Production company: Lamia Producciones
- Distributed by: Alfa Pictures
- Release dates: 25 April 2016 (Málaga); 3 June 2016 (Spain)
- Country: Spain
- Language: Spanish

The Cliff (Spanish: Acantilado) is a 2016 Spanish thriller film directed by Helena Taberna based on the novel El contenido del silencio by Lucía Etxebarria which stars Goya Toledo, Daniel Grao, Juana Acosta, Ingrid García-Jonsson, and Jon Kortajarena.

== Plot ==
Attorney Gabriel goes to the Canary Islands to look for his sister, cult adept Cordelia, missing since a collective suicide took place in the cult. He is helped by Cordelia's friend Helena, coming across the criminal investigation of inspector Santana.

== Cast ==
- Goya Toledo as Santana
- Daniel Grao as Gabriel
- Juana Acosta as Helena
- Ingrid García-Jonsson as Cordelia
- Jon Kortajarena as Julián
- Ana Gracia as Heidi
- Josean Bengoetxea as Martínez
- Xabier Elorriaga as Antonio
- Maiken Beitia as Marion
- Itsaso Arana as Patricia

== Production ==
The film is a Lamia production, with the participation of TVE, ETB, Movistar+, Euskaltel and Gobierno de Navarra. Shooting locations included Navarre, Gipuzkoa, and Gran Canaria.

== Release ==
The film premiered at the 19th Málaga Film Festival on 25 April 2016. Distributed by Alfa Pictures, the film was released theatrically in Spain on 3 June 2016.

== Reception ==
Andrea G. Bermejo of Cinemanía rated the film 3 out of 5 stars, deeming it to be a "cold and efficient" thriller.

Beatriz Martínez of Fotogramas rated the film 2 out of 5 stars, deeming it to be "a film without rhythm, weighed down by inconcretion and that only raises interesting ideas to leave them in a limbo of unanswered questions".

== See also ==
- List of Spanish films of 2016
