= Francesco Carril =

Spanish actor

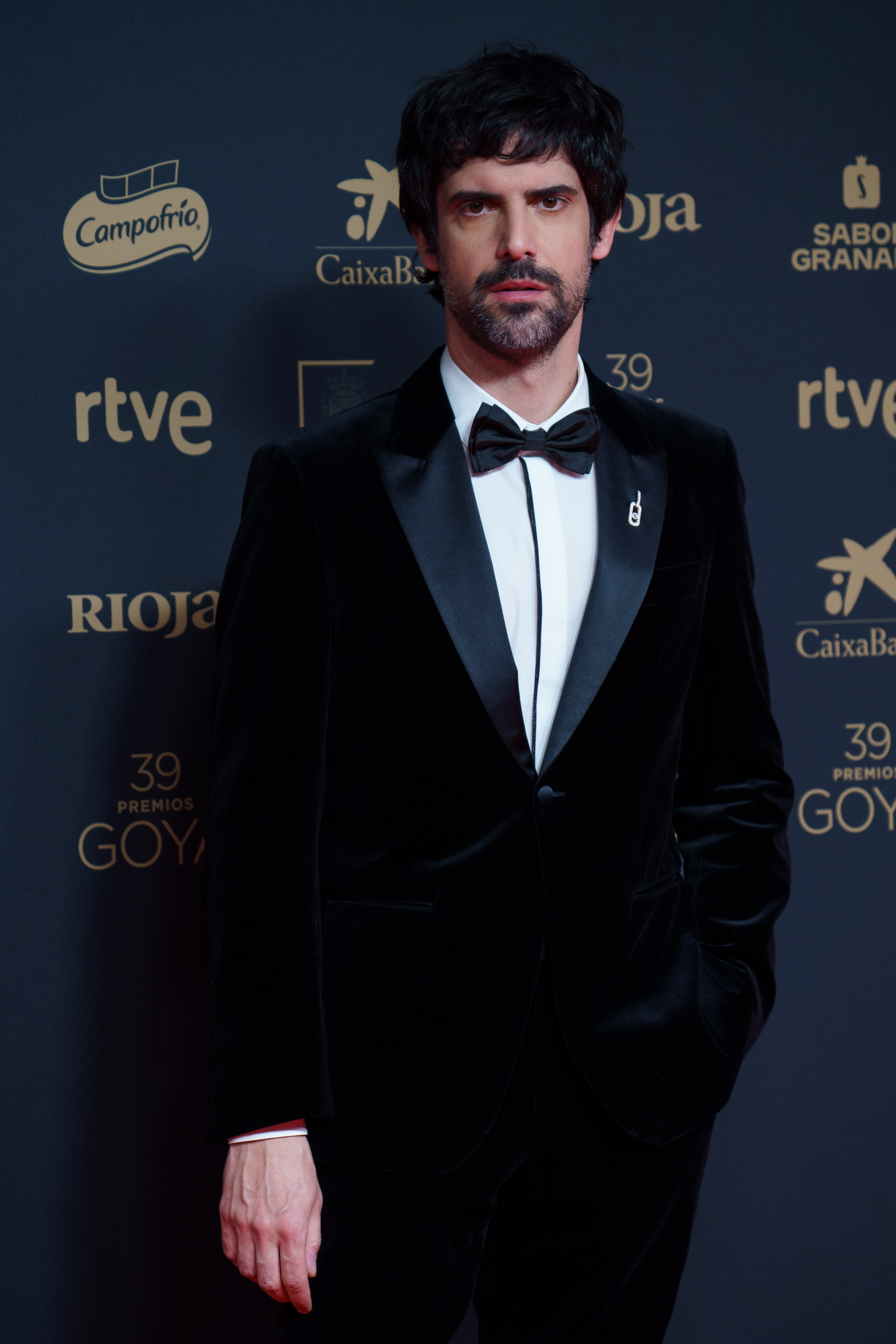
- Carril in 2025
- Born: 21 May 1986 (age 39); Madrid, Spain
- Education: RESAD
- Occupation: Actor

Francesco Carril (born 21 May 1986) is a screen and stage actor from Spain. He is a recurring collaborator of Jonás Trueba.

== Life and career ==
Carril was born on 21 May 1986 in Madrid. Of Italian descent, he spent multiple summers of his youth in Tuscany with his mother's family. At age 18, he joined the RESAD, where he earned an acting degree. In theatre, he worked for the Young National Classical Theater Company and for his own company, Saraband.

His film career is linked to filmmaker Jonás Trueba, starring in The Wishful Thinkers, The Romantic Exiles, The Reconquest, The August Virgin, and You Have to Come and See It.

His performance as a priest in Alfredo Sanzol's play El bar que se tragó a todos los españoles earned him nominations to a Max Award and an Actors and Actresses Union Award. His leading performance alongside Iria del Río in The New Years earned him a nomination for the Feroz Award for Best Actor in a Series.
