= Myocardium (film) =

- Theatrical release poster
- Spanish: Miocardio
- Directed by: José Manuel Carrasco
- Written by: José Manuel Carrasco
- Produced by: María del Puy Alvarado
- Starring: Vito Sanz; Marina Salas; Pilar Bergés; Luis Callejo
- Cinematography: Alberto Pareja
- Edited by: Vanessa Marimbert
- Music by: Laro Basterrechea
- Production company: Malvalanda
- Distributed by: Syldavia Cinema
- Release dates: 14 November 2024 (Seville); 24 January 2025 (Spain)
- Country: Spain
- Language: Spanish

Myocardium (Spanish: Miocardio) is a 2024 Spanish comedy-drama film written and directed by José Manuel Carrasco starring Vito Sanz and Marina Salas.

== Plot ==
Pablo, a middling writer in crisis and dumped by his wife, receives an unexpected visit from Ana, the former fling who broke his heart 15 years ago, upending his miserable existence.

== Cast ==
- Vito Sanz as Pablo
- Marina Salas as Ana
- Luis Callejo
- Pilar Bergés

== Production ==
Myocardium is a Malvalanda production and it had the participation of RTVE and Telemadrid and backing from Ayuntamiento de Madrid and the Madrid regional administration.

== Release ==
The film was presented in the 'Rampa' section of the 21st Seville European Film Festival. It is set to be released theatrically in Spain on 24 January 2025 by Syldavia Cinema.

== Reception ==
Alfonso Rivera of Cineuropa considered that, featuring a "simple" mise-en-scène, the film rests on the "committed" performances of its protagonists.

Sergio F. Pinilla of Cinemanía rated the film 3½ out of 5 stars, writing that Sanz and Salas "summon the ghosts of heartbreak and creative crisis in an eloquent and amusing way".

== See also ==
- List of Spanish films of 2025
