= I Love Your Glasses =

Studio album by Russian Red
- Released: June 29, 2008
- Genre: Indie folk
- Length: 42:11
- Label: Play It Again Sam

Russian Red chronology
I Love Your Glasses (2008)	Fuerteventura (2011)

I Love Your Glasses is the debut album by Spanish indie folk singer Russian Red. It was released in 2008.

== Track listing ==
1. Cigarettes
2. No Past Land
3. They Don't Believe
4. Gone, Play On
5. Hold It Inside
6. Nice Thick Feathers
7. Kiss My Elbow
8. Take Me Home
9. Walls Are Tired
10. Timing Is Crucial
11. Just Like a Wall
12. Girls Just Want to Have Fun
