= 17th Rome Film Festival =

17th edition of Rome Film Festival

Festa del Cinema di Roma
- Official poster
- Opening film: The Hummingbird by Francesca Archibugi
- Closing film: Forever Young by Valeria Bruni Tedeschi
- Location: Auditorium Parco della Musica, Rome
- Founded: 2006
- Hosted by: Cinema Per Roma Foundation; Rome City of Film
- Artistic director: Paola Malanga
- No. of films: 130
- Festival date: Opening: October 13, 2022; Closing: October 23, 2022
- Language: International
- Website: www.romacinemafest.it

Rome Film Festival
- 18th 16th

The 17th Rome Film Festival took place from 13 to 23 October 2022 in the Auditorium Parco della Musica, Rome. It became a competitive festival from 2022. The festival programme was unveiled by Paola Malanga, the festival's new artistic director, on 22 September 2022. It opened with The Hummingbird by Francesca Archibugi, preceded by short film Luciano Pavarotti, la stella by Gianluigi Toccafondo.

The official image of the event was dedicated to Joanne Woodward American retired actress, and her late husband Paul Newman, American actor, film director, race car driver, philanthropist, and entrepreneur, as tribute to legends.

The award ceremony took place on 22 October at the Auditorium Parco della Musica. Progressive Cinema Competition Award for Best Film was awarded to January, a coming-of-age story in the backdrop of Latvian independence by Viestur Kairish, a Latvian opera, movie and theatre director. The festival closed on 28 October with Forever Young, a French-Italian comedy-drama film by Valeria Bruni Tedeschi. James Ivory, an American film director, producer, and screenwriter, was honoured with Lifetime Achievement Award.

== Jury ==
=== Progressive Cinema Competition Award ===
- Marjane Satrapi, French-Iranian graphic novelist, cartoonist, illustrator, film director, and children's book author.
- Louis Garrel, French actor and filmmaker
- Juho Kuosmanen, Finnish film director and screenwriter
- Pietro Marcello, Italian film director
- Gabrielle Tana, British film producer

=== Best First Work Award BNL BNP Paribas ===
- Julie Bertuccelli, French director – president
- Roberto De Paolis, Italian director
- Daniela Michel, film critic

=== Ugo Tognazzi Award for Best Comedy ===
- Carlo Verdone, Italian actor, screenwriter and film director – president
- Marisa Paredes, Spanish actress
- Teresa Mannino, Italian comedian, actress, and television personality

== Official sections ==
=== Progressive Cinema Competition – Visions for the World of Tomorrow ===
- Alam, directed by Firas Khoury (France, Tunisia, Palestine, Saudi Arabia, Qatar)
- The Padilla Case, directed by Pavel Giroud (Spain, Cuba)
- Causeway, directed by Lila Neugebauer (United States)
- La Cura, directed by Francesco Patierno (Italy)
- Foudre, directed by Carmen Jaquier (Switzerland)
- Houria, directed by Mounia Meddour (France, Belgium, Algeria)
- In a Land That No Longer Exists, directed by Aelrun Goette (Germany)
- January, directed by Viesturs Kairišs (Latvia, Lithuania, Poland)
- Jeong-sun, directed by Jeong Ji-hye (South Korea)
- Lü Guan / The Hotel, directed by Wang Xiaoshuai (Hong Kong)
- I morti rimangono con la bocca aperta, directed by Fabrizio Ferraro (Italy)
- Ramona, directed by Andrea Bagney (Spain)
- Raymond & Ray, directed by Rodrigo García (Mexico, United States)
- Sanctuary, directed by Zachary Wigon (United States)
- Shttl, directed by Ady Walter (Ukraine, France)
- La Tour, directed by Guillaume Nicloux (France)

=== Freestyle ===
- 75 – Ronconi Venice Biennale, directed by Jacopo Quadri (Italy)
- ABOrisms, portraits and self-portraits, directed by Nunzio Massimo Nifosì (Italy)
- Beloved Shores, directed by Egidio Eronico (Italy)
- Slums, directed by Francesco Pividori (Italy)

=== Great Public ===
- The Hummingbird, directed by Francesca Archibugi (Italy, France) - opening film
- Luciano Pavarotti, the Star, directed by Gianluigi Toccafondo - documentary
- Amsterdam, directed by David O. Russell (United States)
- Never Too Late for Love, directed by Gianni Di Gregorio (Italy)
- Bros, directed by Nicholas Stoller (United States)
- Butcher's Crossing, directed by Gabe Polsky (United States)
- Physical Education, directed by Stefano Cipani (Italy, Poland)
- Still Time, directed by Alessandro Arondio (Italy)
- The Lost King, directed by Stephen Frears (United Kingdom)
- The Menu, directed by Mark Mylod (United States)
- Mrs. Harris Goes to Paris, directed by Anthony Fabian (United Kingdom, Hungary)
- Caravaggio's Shadow, directed by Michele Placido (Italy, France)
- The Prince of Rome, directed by Edoardo Falcone (Italy)
- Robbing Mussolini, directed by Renato De Maria (Italy)
- Rheingold, directed by Fatih Akın (Germany, Netherlands, Morocco, Mexico)
- Strangeness, directed by Roberto Andò (Italy)
- War - The desired war, directed by Gianni Zanasi (Italy, France)
- What's Love Got to Do with It?, directed by Shekhar Kapur (United Kingdom)

=== Special screenings ===
- Les années Super 8, directed by Annie Ernaux and David Ernaux-Briot (France)
- A Cooler Climate, directed by James Ivory and Giles Gardner (United Kingdom)
- Good Morning Tel Aviv, directed by Giovanna Gagliardo (Italy)
- Kill Me If You Can, directed by Alex Infascelli (Italy)
- Kordon, directed by Alice Tomassini (Italy)
- Now It's Our Turn - The Story of Pio La Torre, directed by Walter Veltroni (Italy)
- Polański, Horowitz. Hometown, directed by Mateusz Kudła and Anna Kokoszka-Romer (Poland)
- Portrait of a Queen, directed by Fabrizio Ferri (Italy)
- Rules of War, directed by Guido Hendrikx (Netherlands)
- Umberto Eco - The Library of the World, directed by Davide Ferrario (Italy)
- Via Argine 310, directed by Gianfranco Pannone (Italy)

=== Best of 2022 ===
- All That Breathes, directed by Shaunak Sen (India, United States, United Kingdom)
- The Beasts, directed by Rodrigo Sorogoyen (Spain, France)
- Boy from Heaven, directed by Tarik Saleh (Sweden, France, Finland)
- Corsage, directed by Marie Kreutzer (Austria, Luxembourg, Germany, France)
- The Fabelmans, directed by Steven Spielberg (United States)
- Final Cut, directed by Michel Hazanavicius (France)
- Forever Young , directed by Valeria Bruni Tedeschi (France) - closing film
- The Innocent, directed by Louis Garrel (France)
- Klondike, directed by Maryna Er Gorbach (Ukraine, Turkey)
- Rabiye Kurnaz vs. George W. Bush, directed by Andreas Dresen (Germany, France)
- Scarlet (L'Envol), directed by Pietro Marcello (France, Italy, Germany)
- Triangle of Sadness, directed by Ruben Östlund (Sweden, Germany, France, United Kingdom)

=== History of cinema ===
==== Homage to James Ivory ====
- Maurice, directed by James Ivory (United Kingdom, 1987) - Restored copy
- Mr. & Mrs. Bridge, directed by James Ivory (United Kingdom, United States, Canada, 1990) - Ms. Woodward and Mr. Newman Retrospective
- The Remains of the Day, directed by James Ivory (United Kingdom, United States, 1993)
- A Room with a View, directed by James Ivory (United Kingdom, 1985)

==== Tribute to Marisa Paredes ====
Marisa Paredes is a Spanish actress.

- High Heels, directed by Pedro Almodóvar (Spain, France, 1991)

==== Homage to Jean-Luc Godard ====
Jean-Luc Godard was a French and Swiss film director, screenwriter, and film critic.

- A Married Woman, directed by Jean-Luc Godard (France, 1964)

==== Restorations ====
- Duck in Orange Sauce, directed by Luciano Salce (Italy, 1975)

==== Documentaries ====
- Pure Silver, directed by Matteo Ceccarelli (Italy)

=== Retrospective ===
The tribute to Joanne Woodward and Paul Newman.

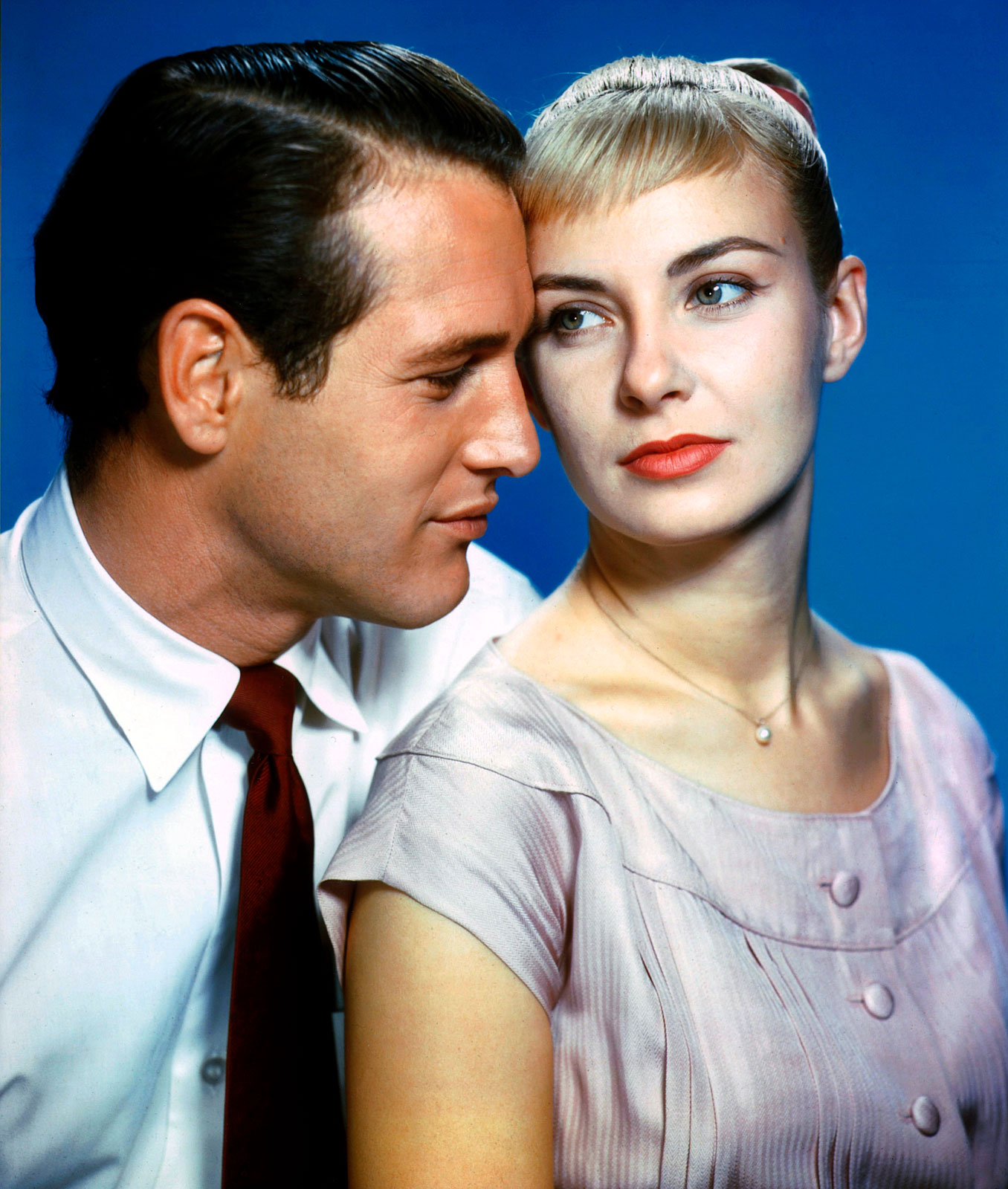
Joanne Woodward and Paul Newman in 1958

- Butch Cassidy and the Sundance Kid, directed by George Roy Hill (United States, Mexico, 1969)
- The Effect of Gamma Rays on Man-in-the-Moon Marigolds, directed by Paul Newman (USA, 1972)
- A Fine Madness, directed by Irvin Kershner (United States, 1966)
- The Fugitive Kind, directed by Sidney Lumet (United States, 1960)
- The Glass Menagerie, directed by Paul Newman (United States, 1987)
- Hud, directed by Martin Ritt (United States, 1963)
- The Hustler, directed by Robert Rossen (United States, 1961)
- A Kiss Before Dying, directed by Gerd Oswald (United States, 1956)
- The Long, Hot Summer, directed by Martin Ritt (United States, 1958)
- Mr. & Mrs. Bridge, directed by James Ivory (United Kingdom, United States, Canada, 1990)
- Rachel, Rachel, directed by Paul Newman (United States, 1968)
- Rally 'Round the Flag, Boys!, directed by Leo McCarey (United States, 1958)
- Sometimes a Great Notion, directed by Paul Newman (United States, 1971)
- The Three Faces of Eve, directed by Nunnally Johnson (United States, 1957)
- The Verdict, directed by Sidney Lumet (United States, 1982)

== Awards and winners ==
- Lifetime Achievement Award
  - James Ivory

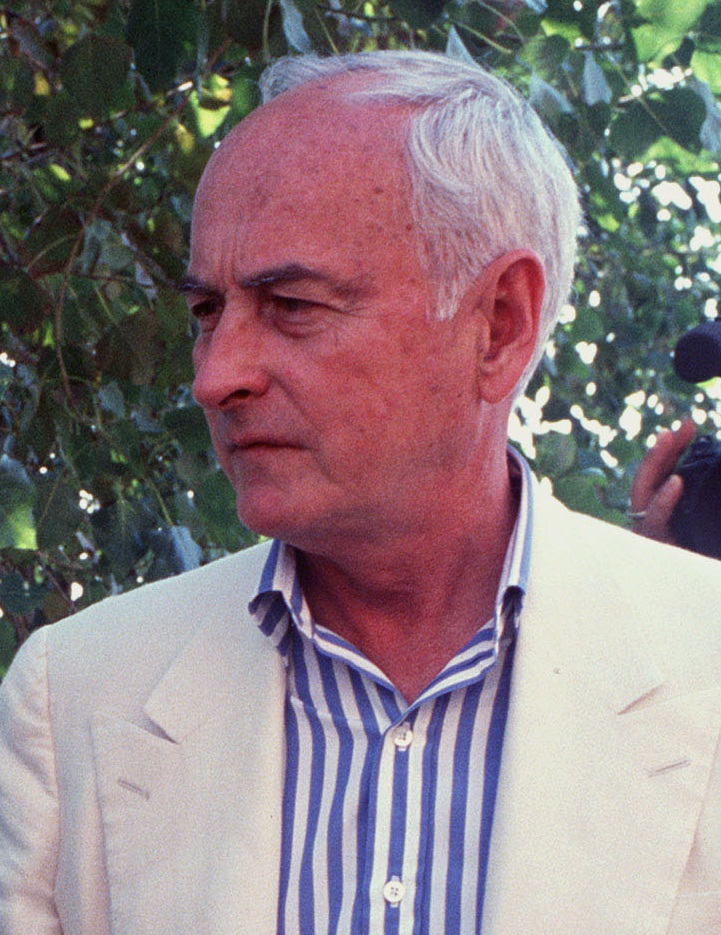
James Ivory, Lifetime Achievement Award

=== Progressive Cinema Competition ===
- Best Film: January by Viestur Kairish, Latvia, Lithuania, Poland
- Grand Jury Prize: Jeong Sun by Jeong Ji-hye, South Korea
- Best Director: Viestur Kairish for January, Latvia, Lithuania, Poland
- Monica Vitti Prize for Best Actress: Kim Kum-soon for Jeong Sun, South Korea
- Vittorio Gassman Prize for Best Actor: Karlis Arnolds Avots, January, Latvia, Lithuania, Poland
- Best Screenplay: Andrea Bagney for Ramona, Spain
- Special Jury Prizes: Thunder, Carmen Jaquier, Switzerland
- Special Jury Mention: Lilith Grasmug - Thunder
- Best Comedy: What's Love Got to Do with It? Shekhar Kapur (United Kingdom)
- Special Mention: “Ugo Tognazzi” Award: Ramona, Andrea Bagney
- BNL BNP Paribas Prize for Best First Film: Causeway, Lila Neugebauer (United States)
- Special Mentions
  - Ramona, Andrea Bagney, Spain
  - Thunder, Carmen Jaquier, Switzerland
- Audience Award Shttl, Ady Walter (Ukraine, France)

=== Alice nella città ===
- Best Film Award: Summer Scars, Simon Rieth (France)
- Special Mention: Il cerchio, Sophie Chiarello (Italy)
- Raffaella Fioretta Award for Italian Cinema: Primadonna - Marta Savina (Italy)
- Do-Cine Rising Star Award for Best International Young Actor: Mallory Manecque - The Worst Ones (France)
- RB Casting Award for Best Italian Young Actor: Giuseppe Pirozzi - Piano piano (Italy)
- Special Mention: Lorenzo Richelmy - The Man on the Road (Italy)
- Corbucci Award: Signs Of Love - Clarence Fuller (United States)
- Best Short Film Award: Torto marcio - Prospero Pensa (Italy)
- Special Mention: File - Sonia K. Hadad (Iran)
- Audience Award for Best Short Film: Caramelle - Matteo Panebarco (Italy)
