= The Wishful Thinkers =

- Film poster
- Spanish: Los ilusos
- Directed by: Jonás Trueba
- Written by: Jonás Trueba
- Produced by: Javier Lafuente; Jonás Trueba
- Starring: Francesco Carril; Aura Garrido; Vito Sanz; Mikele Urroz; Isabelle Stoffel; Luis Miguel Madrid
- Cinematography: Santiago Racaj
- Edited by: Marta Velasco
- Release date: 12 April 2013
- Country: Spain
- Language: Spanish

The Wishful Thinkers (Spanish: Los ilusos) is a 2013 Spanish independent drama film directed and written by Jonás Trueba. It is shot in black and white. The cast features Francesco Carril, Aura Garrido, Vito Sanz, Mikele Urroz, Isabelle Stoffel, and Luis Miguel Madrid.

== Plot ==
The plot follows the experiences of a group of film lovers living in Madrid.

== Cast ==
- Francesco Carril as León
- Aura Garrido as Sofía
- Mikele Urroz
- Vito Sanz as Bruno
- Isabelle Stoffel as Lilian
- Luis Miguel Madrid as Perucho

== Production ==
Footage for the film was shot from November 2011 to June 2012. The film was shot in Madrid in black and white on 16 mm. The Madrid's Plaza Mayor features in the film.

== Release ==
The film premiered on 12 April 2013. It did not have a conventional theatrical release, but it was self-distributed, with screenings in specialised theatres and film archives, in presence of the director.

== Reception ==
Jonathan Holland of The Hollywood Reporter summed up the film in a bottom line as "an engaging, free-rolling and faux-shambolic 16mm homage to lives lived for film far beyond the outer reaches of the film industry".

Jordi Costa of Fotogramas rated the film 3 out of 5 stars, praising its stylistic bet as an standout while warning that the film's self-absorbed nature may work against it.

Andrea G. Bermejo of Cinemanía rated it 4½ out of 5 stars, concluding that Trueba found his own Antoine Doinel in Francesco Carril.

Jordi Costa of El País, considered that Trueba advances his discourse and manners in relation to his debut film, yet [the director] essentially remains the same, also underscoring that he "has not made a film: he has gone out to look for one and what he has found is valuable".

== Accolades ==
Year	Award	Category	Nominee(s)	Result	Ref.
2013	15th Buenos Aires International Festival of Independent Cinema	Best Actor	Francesco Carril	Won	
2013	16th Toulouse Spanish Film Festival	Golden Violet		Won	
2013	16th Toulouse Spanish Film Festival	Best Actor	Francesco Carril	Won	
2013	16th Toulouse Spanish Film Festival	Best Original Score	Abel Hernández	Won	

== See also ==
- List of Spanish films of 2013
