= You Have to Come and See It =

- Theatrical release poster
- Spanish: Tenéis que venir a verla
- Directed by: Jonás Trueba
- Written by: Jonás Trueba
- Produced by: Javier Lafuente; Jonás Trueba
- Starring: Itsaso Arana; Vito Sanz; Francesco Carril; Irene Escolar
- Cinematography: Santiago Racaj
- Edited by: Marta Velasco
- Production company: Los Ilusos Films
- Distributed by: Atalante
- Release date: 17 June 2022
- Country: Spain
- Language: Spanish

You Have to Come and See It (Spanish: Tenéis que venir a verla) is a 2022 Spanish film written and directed by Jonás Trueba. It stars Itsaso Arana, Vito Sanz, Francesco Carril and Irene Escolar.

== Plot ==
Two couples of friends (Elena and Daniel and Guillermo and Susana) who have not seen each other in about a year meet again at a musical piece by Chano Domínguez at Madrid's Café Central. Guillermo and Susana have left Madrid and moved to a new house in the suburbs, inviting Elena and Daniel to come and see it, claiming that it is at about half an hour by train from Atocha. It also comes up the news that Susana is pregnant, which surprises Daniel, not so much Elena. Back to their apartment, Elena and Daniel discuss about the night and about having children.

Six months later, Elena and Daniel travel in a Cercanías train to their friends' new house, although they confuse the C-3 and C-10 lines and, instead of arriving in the intended station, they end up near Alpedrete. Guillermo picks them up by car, and presents them the distinct areas areas in his new town. They arrive to the house (which belonged to Susana's father) to find Susana, who apparently suffered the early termination of her pregnancy. Guillermo claims that he wants to take advantage of the utilities in the garage to do manual woodworking. While all four are having a lunch, Elena goes to search the book she has recently read—You Must Change Your Life by Peter Sloterdijk—and which is now being read by Daniel as, after discussing the book's concept of anthropotechnics, she wants to lecture her friends about another neologism described in the work. Elena and Susana talk about how Susana is not as happy as Guillermo is in their new life, and about how Susana is not sure if she is capable of carrying another pregnancy. The four friends play ping pong. The four friends take a walk in the countryside. Elena lags behind and takes the opportunity to take a leak in the wild, bringing smiles to her face. The film crew inserts itself in a segment shot in Super 8 film. The film ends.

== Cast ==
- Itsaso Arana as Elena
- Vito Sanz as Daniel
- Francesco Carril as Guillermo
- Irene Escolar as Susana

== Production ==
Produced by Los Ilusos Films, the film had the collaboration from the Ayuntamiento de Madrid and the Madrid regional administration.

== Release ==
Distributed by Atalante, the film was theatrically released in Spain on 17 June 2022. It also screened at the 56th Karlovy Vary International Film Festival's official competition in July 2022. It will have its North-American premiere at the 2022 New York Film Festival. It also made it to 'World Cinema' section of 27th Busan International Film Festival to be screened in October 2022.

== Reception ==
On the review aggregator website Rotten Tomatoes, 100% of 8 critics' reviews are positive, with an average rating of 8.3/10.

Quim Casas of El Periódico de Catalunya rated the film 4 out of 5 stars, deeming it to be, short of being an overly political film, "frank, direct, fluid, somewhat sad, well built around its four performers and with a beautiful experimental coda". Beatriz Martínez of Fotogramas rated the film 5 out of 5 stars, pointing out that Trueba displays "the unusual ability to capture a state of mind", with the film underpinning, in addition to a letter of love to cinema, "the best X-ray yet of the feeling of limbo in the aftermath of the [COVID-19] pandemic". Andrea G. Bermejo of Cinemanía scored 4 out of 5 stars, determining the film to be, out of all Trueba's works, the one connecting the most with the real, underscoring as a bottom line: "like a day in the country with friends. Pure enjoyment". Reviewing for Deadline, Anna Smith assessed that the film features "a simple but effective set up; a characterful ramble powered by four terrific performances and witty dialogue rooted in the truth". Jessica Kiang of Variety deemed the film ("one of the late-breaking joys of the Karlovy Vary competition") to be "as sociable and swiggable as a draught or 10 of sweetly fortified wine". Javier Ocaña of El País considered that, depending on who looks at it and lives it, the film can be either "placid, bitter, lucid and enveloping", or "simply ironic, provocative and even comical. And maybe they are all right".

=== Top ten lists ===
The film appeared on a number of critics' top ten lists of the best Spanish films of 2022:

- 1st — El Cultural (Mariona Burrull)
- 3rd — El Cultural (Carlos Reviriego)
- 3rd — El Cultural (Javier Yuste)
- 7th — El Confidencial (Marta Medina)

== Accolades ==
| Year | Award | Category | Nominee(s) | Result | Ref. |
|---|---|---|---|---|---|
| 2022 | 56th Karlovy Vary International Film Festival | Special Jury Prize | | Won | |
| 2023 | 10th Feroz Awards | Best Comedy Film | | Nominated | |

== See also ==
- List of Spanish films of 2022
