= Itsaso Arana =

Spanish actress and writer

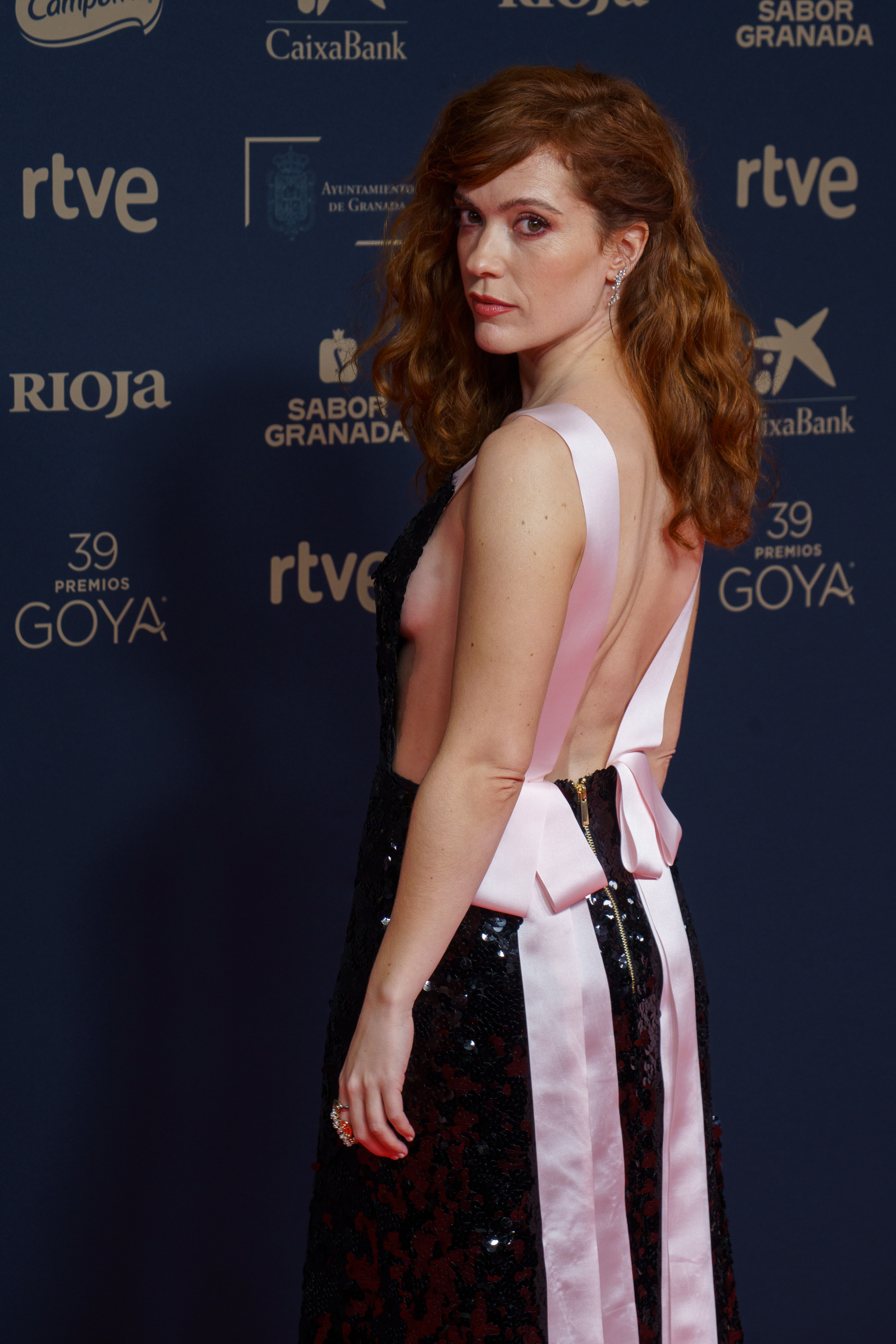
- Arana in 2025
- Born: Itsaso Arana Baztan; 20 August 1985 (age 41); Tafalla, Navarre, Spain
- Education: RESAD
- Occupations: Actress; screenwriter

Itsaso Arana Baztan (born 20 August 1985) is a Spanish actress and writer.

== Biography ==
Born on 20 August 1985 in Tafalla, Navarre, she earned a degree in Interpretación textual from the Madrid's RESAD. She founded the theatre company 'La tristura' alongside another two RESAD alumni. She has since featured in films such as The Cliff or Seventeen and series such as 14 de abril. La República, Vergüenza, High Seas, Dime Quién Soy: Mistress of War and Reyes de la noche.

In 2022, she wrapped shooting of her debut feature as a director, The Girls Are Alright, in which she also plays an acting part.

== Filmography ==
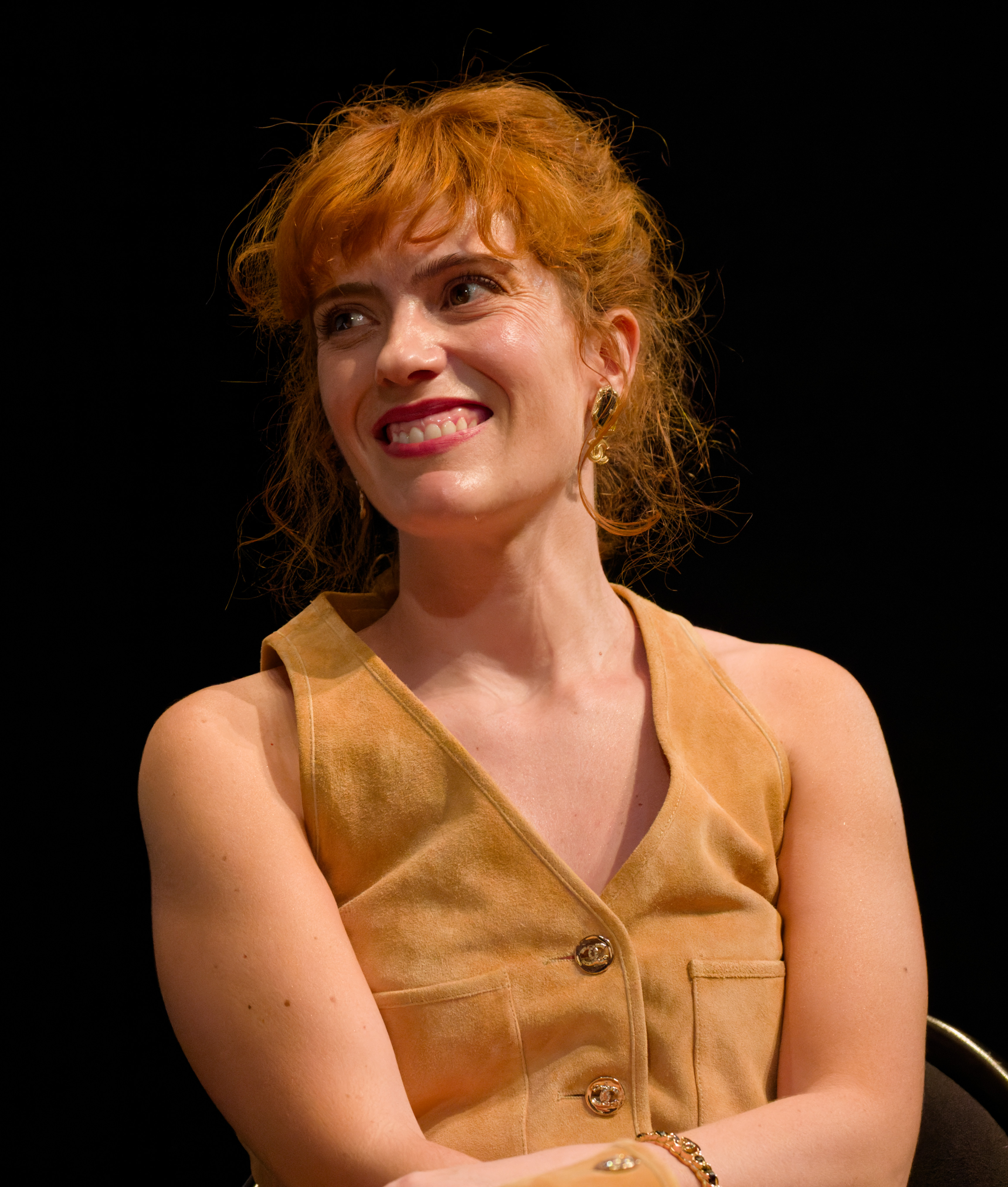
Arana at the 2024 Cannes Film Festival

=== Film ===
Key
†	Denotes films that have not yet been released

Year	Title	Role	Notes	Ref.
2016	Acantilado (The Cliff)			
2016	La reconquista (The Reconquest)	Manuela		
2019	La virgen de agosto (The August Virgin)	Eva	Also writer	
2019	Diecisiete (Seventeen)	Esther		
2022	Tenéis que venir a verla (You Have to Come and See It)	Elena		
2023	Las chicas están bien (The Girls Are Alright)	Itsaso	Also director and writer	
2024	Volveréis (The Other Way Around)	Ale	Also writer	
2026	La más dulce (Strawberries)	Pilar		
TBA	La Regenta †	Visitación		

=== Television ===
Year	Title	Role	Notes	Ref.
2008	Eva y kolegas	Josune		
2013	El don de Alba	Andrea		
2014	Prim, el asesinato de la calle del Turco	Josefa	TV movie	
2017–20	Vergüenza	Verónica		
2020–21	Dime quién soy (Dime Quién Soy: Mistress of War)	Edurne		
2021	Reyes de la noche	Marga Laforet		
2022	Las de la última fila (The Girls at the Back)	Sara		

== Accolades ==
Year	Award	Category	Work	Result	Ref.
2022	9th Feroz Awards	Best Supporting Actress in a TV Series	Reyes de la noche	Nominated	
