= Thunder (2022 film) =

- Film poster
- French: Foudre
- Directed by: Carmen Jaquier
- Written by: Carmen Jaquier
- Produced by: Flavia Zanon; Joëlle Bertossa
- Starring: Lilith Grasmug
- Cinematography: Marine Atlan
- Edited by: Xavier Sirven
- Music by: Nicolas Rabaeus
- Production companies: Close Up Films; RTS Radio Télévision Suisse
- Release date: 10 September 2022 (TIFF)
- Running time: 92 minutes
- Country: Switzerland
- Language: French

Thunder (French: Foudre) is a 2022 Swiss drama film written and directed by Carmen Jaquier. Set in Switzerland in 1900, it centres on a teenage girl whose religious vocation is unsettled by her return to the family home after her older sister’s death. The film was selected as the Swiss entry for the Best International Feature Film at the 96th Academy Awards. It won awards including prizes at the 2022 Rome Film Festival and the 2023 Swiss Film Awards.

== Synopsis ==
In the summer of 1900, Elisabeth, a 17-year-old novice who has spent five years in a convent, is forced to return to her family home in a valley in southern Switzerland after the sudden death of her older sister. Back in the village she left behind, she struggles against its strict social rules while confronting the circumstances surrounding her sister’s death.

== Cast ==
The cast includes:

- Lilith Grasmug as Elisabeth
- Lou Iff as Paule
- Diana Gervalla as Adèle
- Benjamin Python as Emile
- Noah Watzlawick as Pierrot
- Mermoz Melchior as Joseph
- Sabine Timoteo as the Mother
- Barbara Tobola as the Mother Superior
- François Revaclier as the Father
- Léa Gigon as Innocente
- Marco Calamandrei as the Priest

== Production ==
Jaquier said that she was inspired by notebooks belonging to her grandmother, which described her childhood in Valais at the beginning of the 20th century. The film was shot between August and September 2020 in the Binn Valley in Upper Valais. Jaquier also cited Pier Paolo Pasolini’s The Gospel According to Matthew as an influence on the film’s atmosphere.

== Reception ==
SRF described the film as a highly sensual yet naturalistically raw plea for female self-determination. Tages-Anzeiger called the film powerful, wrote that Jaquier had found her own aesthetic, and said that the historical drama nevertheless felt contemporary. NZZ described the film as a drama about the Church’s fear of desire, spiritual constriction, and irrepressible youthful curiosity.

== Awards and nominations ==
The film was selected as the Swiss entry for the Best International Feature Film at the 96th Academy Awards. In selecting the film, the Swiss jury described it as a feminist period film centred on liberation and sisterhood. It did not make the Academy’s December 2023 shortlist.

| Year | Award | Category | Nominee(s) | Result | Ref. |
|---|---|---|---|---|---|
| 2022 | 17th Rome Film Festival | Special Jury Prize | Carmen Jaquier | Won | |
| 2022 | 17th Rome Film Festival | Special Jury Mention | Lilith Grasmug | Won | |
| 2022 | 17th Rome Film Festival | BNL BNP Paribas Prize for Best First Film: Special Mention | Carmen Jaquier | Won | |
| 2023 | Swiss Film Award | Best Feature Film | Thunder | Nominated | |
| 2023 | Swiss Film Award | Best Sound | Carlos Ibañez Diaz and Denis Séchaud | Won | |
| 2023 | Swiss Film Award | Best Film Score | Nicolas Rabaeus | Won | |

== Festival screenings ==
The film premiered in the Platform section at the 2022 Toronto International Film Festival on September 10, 2022, and was later screened at festivals including the 2022 San Sebastián International Film Festival, the 2022 Zurich Film Festival, the 2023 Locarno Film Festival, the 2023 Sydney Film Festival, and the 2024 Visions du Réel.

== See also ==
- List of submissions to the 96th Academy Awards for Best International Feature Film
- List of Swiss submissions for the Academy Award for Best International Feature Film
