= Fariba Sheikhan =

Basque actress

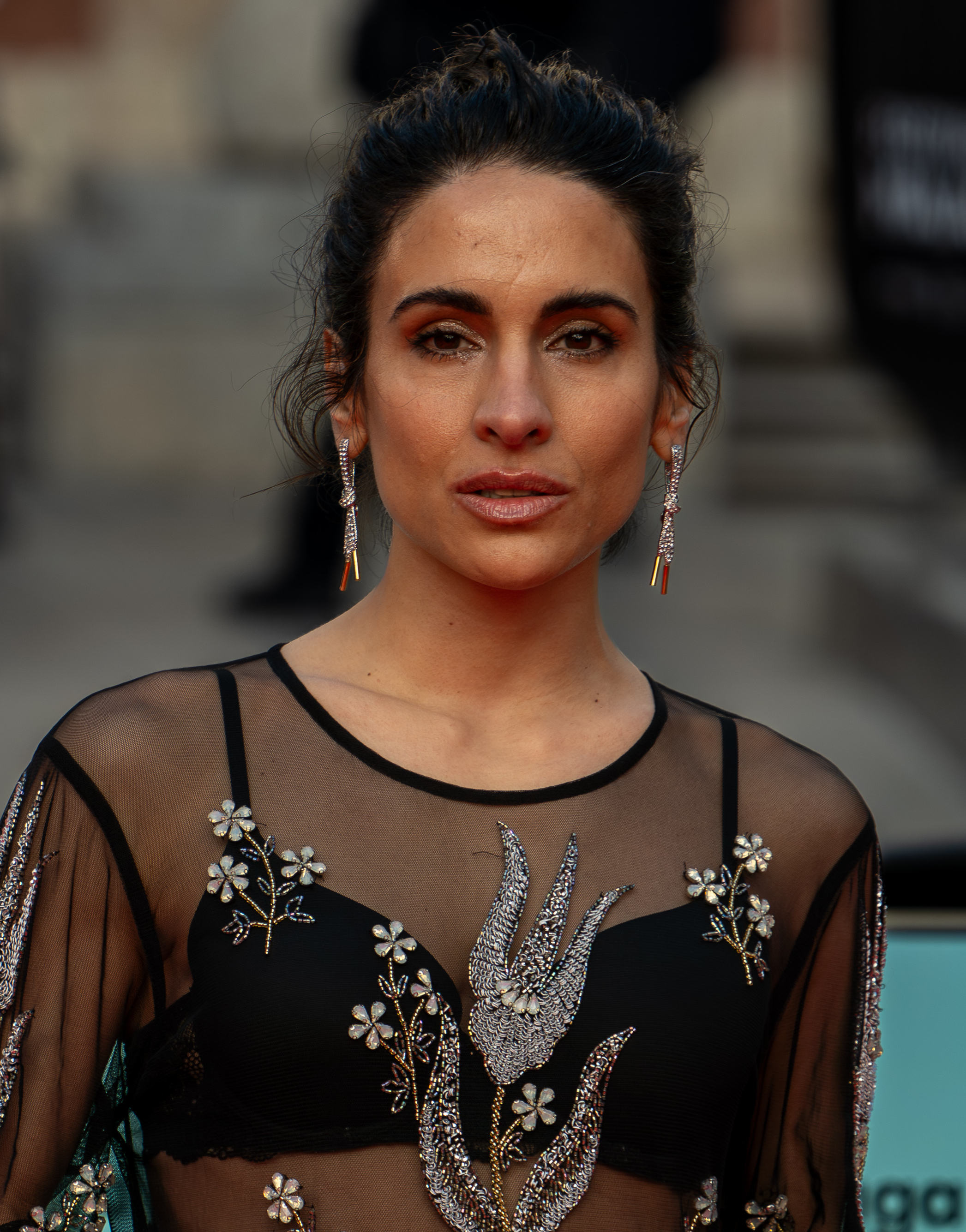
- Sheikhan in 2026
- Born: Fariba Sheikhan Uriarte; 7 March 1988 (age 38); Barakaldo, Basque Country, Spain
- Occupation: Actress

Fariba Sheikhan Uriarte (born 7 March 1988) is a Basque actress. She is known for her work in the television series El secreto de Puente Viejo and La unidad.

== Life and career ==
Born at the Hospital de Cruces of Barakaldo on 7 March 1988 to a Basque mother and an Iranian father, (Note: Older sources state Gernika as her birthplace.) Fariba Sheikhan Uriarte was raised in Gernika. She is fluent in Basque and Persian (her first languages) as well as Spanish. She trained at the Escuela Superior de Arte Dramático in Seville and the Cristina Rota acting school in Madrid. Following appearances in Basque shows such as Goenkale and Bi eta bat, she joined the soap opera El secreto de Puente Viejo in 2014 to portray Inés, making her jump to Spain-wide television.

She appeared in international works such as Guy Ritchie's The Covenant and Tehran. From 2020 to 2023, she starred as the cop Najwa in the police thriller television series La unidad and its follow-up La unidad: Kabul. After living in Seville, San Sebastián, London, and Málaga, she established in Madrid by 2023. She featured as Francesca in Goodbye Madrid (2024). Also in 2024, she wrapped shooting the horror film Disforia. Her television career continued with roles in Matices and Salvador.
