= Every Song Is About Me =

- Film poster
- Spanish: Todas las canciones hablan de mí
- Directed by: Jonás Trueba
- Screenplay by: Jonás Trueba; Daniel Gascón
- Produced by: Gerardo Herrero; Mariela Besuievsky
- Starring: Oriol Vila; Bárbara Lennie; Bruno Bergonzini; Valeria Alonso; Ángela Cremonte; Miriam Giovanelli; Ramón Fontserè
- Cinematography: Santiago Racaj
- Edited by: Marta Velasco
- Production companies: Castafiore Films; Tornasol Films
- Distributed by: Alta Classics
- Release date: 10 December 2010
- Country: Spain
- Language: Spanish

Every Song Is About Me (Spanish: Todas las canciones hablan de mí) is a 2010 Spanish romantic comedy-drama film directed by Jonás Trueba which stars Oriol Vila and Bárbara Lennie, also featuring Bruno Bergonzini, Valeria Alonso, Ángela Cremonte, Miriam Giovanelli and Ramon Fontserè.

== Plot ==
The story is set in Madrid. The plot follows the relationship between aspiring poet Ramiro and architecture student Andrea, as the former tries to get through the separation from the latter.

== Cast ==
- Oriol Vila as Ramiro
- Bárbara Lennie as Andrea
- Ramón Fontserè as Luismi
- Ángela Cremonte as Irene
- Bruno Bergonzini as Lucas
- Eloy Azorín as Nico
- Valeria Alonso as Silvia
- Daniel Castro as Gonzalo
- Miriam Giovanelli as Raquel

== Production ==
Every Song is About Me is Jonás Trueba's debut as a feature film director. The screenplay was penned by Trueba alongside Daniel Gascón. Gerardo Herrero and Mariela Besuievsky were credited as producers. The film is a Castafiore Films and Tornasol Films production and it had the participation of Canal+ and RTVV.

== Release ==
Distributed by Alta Classics, the film was theatrically released in Spain on 10 December 2010.

== Reception ==
Andrea G. Bermejo of Cinemanía rated the film with 3 out of 5 stars, deeming the filmmaking to be better than the writing, also considering that part of the film's supporting cast is squandered and that the story features an "intentionally naturalistic tone" "that makes us neither laugh nor cry".

Jordi Costa of Fotogramas scored 2 out of 5 stars, writing that the monologue laid out by Vila's character "is a perfect declaration of principles: Ramiro doesn't want to move... and Jonás Trueba's cinema doesn't seem willing to do so either".

== Accolades ==
Year	Award	Category	Nominee(s)	Result	Ref.
2011	25th Goya Awards	Best New Director	Jonás Trueba	Nominated	
2011	25th Goya Awards	Best New Actor	Oriol Vila	Nominated	

== See also ==
- List of Spanish films of 2010
