= Diamond Flash =

- Film poster
- Directed by: Carlos Vermut
- Written by: Carlos Vermut
- Starring: Ángela Boix; Miquel Insua; Klaus; Rocío León; Eva Llorach; Victoria Radonic; Ángela Villar
- Cinematography: Carlos Vermut
- Edited by: Carlos Vermut
- Production company: Psicosoda Films
- Distributed by: Filmin
- Release dates: October 2011 (Abycine); 8 June 2012 (Spain)
- Country: Spain
- Language: Spanish

Diamond Flash is a 2011 Spanish independent film directed, written and produced by Carlos Vermut in his directorial debut feature.

== Plot ==
The plot consists of five vignettes concerning five women (Violeta, Elena, Lola, Juana, and Enriqueta) who share a mutual connection to the mysterious Diamond Flash.

== Cast ==
- Ángela Boix as Juana
- Miquel Insua as Diamond Flash
- Klaus as Jaime
- Rocío León as Lola
- Eva Llorach as Violeta
- Victoria Radonic as Enriqueta
- Ángela Villar as Elena
- Javier Botet as hombre chistoso

== Production ==
Boasting a low budget of about €20,000, the film was financed by the money Vermut made from Jelly Jamm. The film blends genres such as giallo, science-fiction, comedy, drama, thriller, and superhero films. Shooting locations included the Centro district in Madrid, including the area of Malasaña.

== Release ==
The Albacete-based Abycine Festival selected the picture for the non-competitive slate, with the film premiering in 2011. Diamond Flash was later picked up for a screening at the Sitges Film Festival. It had a straight streaming release on Filmin on 8 June 2012. It eventually earned a cult status.

== Reception ==
Andrea G. Bermejo of Cinemanía rated Diamond Flash 4 out of 5 stars, assessing that Vermut delivers "a film of characters and powerful dramatic writing that is supported by a cast of amazing—and, paradoxically, semi-unknown actors".

== See also ==
- List of Spanish films of 2012
