= Miriam Giovanelli =

Spanish actress and model

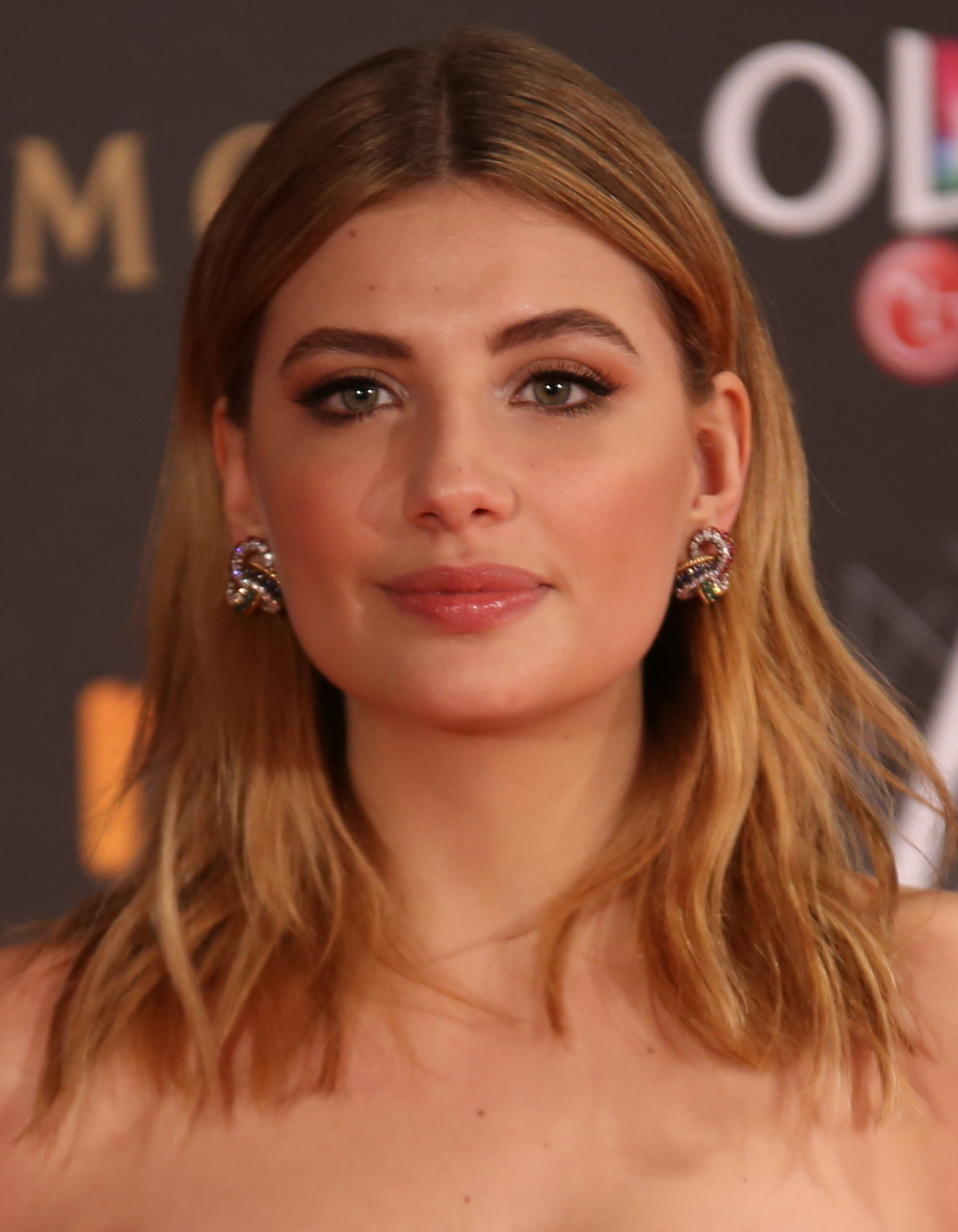
- Miriam Giovanelli at the Goya Awards in 2017
- Born: 28 April 1989 (age 36); Rome, Italy
- Citizenship: Italy; Spain
- Occupations: Actress; Model
- Years active: 2001-present
- Height: 1.68 m (5 ft 6 in)
- Spouse: Xabi Ortega (m. 2017)
- Children: 2

Miriam Giovanelli (born 28 April 1989) is an Italian-Spanish actress and model.

== Biography ==
Miriam Giovanelli was born in Rome, Italy to an Italian father and Spanish mother.

== Personal life ==
On 23 September 2017, she married the Spanish architect Xabi Ortega in Quintanilla de Arriba, Valladolid, Spain. On 26 November 2019, she gave birth to the couple's first child, a girl, whom they called Renata Ortega Giovanelli, who was born in the clínica Quirón de San José. On 11 January 2021, she gave birth to the couple's second child, a boy, whom they called Lorenzo Ortega Giovanelli.

== Career ==
Her filmography includes many Spanish language films and a growing number in the English and Italian languages. Several of these productions have achieved considerable success.

== Filmography ==
Year	Title	Role	Notes
2001	... ya no puede caminar	Irene	Short Film
2005	Los Serrano	Cameo Appearance	TV series
2005	El Comisario	Cameo Appearance	TV series
2007	Miguel y William	Consuelo	
2007	Limoncello	Tiziana	Short Film
2007	Canciones de amor en Lolita's Club	Alina	
2008	Rivales	Carla	
2008	El castigo	Simona	TV series
2008	Mentiras y gordas	Paz	
2009	Física o Química	Lucía	TV series
2009	Sin tetas no hay paraíso	Sandra Barrio	TV series
2010	Todas las canciones hablan de mí	Raquel	
2011	Dracula 3D	Tania	
2011	Drifters	Belinda	
2011	Violet	Violet	
2012	I 2 soliti idioti	Perla/Sheron	
2012/13	Il tredicesimo Apostolo	Rebecca	
2014–2016	Velvet	Patricia Márquez	TV series
2017	Velvet Colección	Patricia Márquez	TV series
2018	El año de la plaga	Lola	Film
2020	Caronte	Marta Pelayo	TV series
