= Goodbye Madrid =

- Theatrical release poster
- Spanish: Adiós Madrid
- Directed by: Diego Corsini
- Screenplay by: Mariana Cangas; Diego Corsini
- Story by: Mariana Cangas
- Produced by: Javier Ayvar; Gustavo Otero; Mariana Cangas; Diego Corsini; Luciano Cáceres
- Starring: Luciano Cáceres; Javier Godino; Fariba Sheikhan; Mónica Solaun; Ramón Esquinas; Sara Vega; Ingrid Rubio
- Cinematography: Pedro Calamar; Santiago Squadroni
- Edited by: Christian Valente; Santiago Squadroni; Mateo Merino
- Music by: Alan Senderovitsch; Andy Colombo
- Production companies: Madco; Cinescalas
- Distributed by: 39 Escalones Films (Spain); 3C Films (Argentina)
- Release dates: 19 September 2024 (FCM-PNR); 17 January 2025 (Spain); 28 August 2025 (Argentina)
- Countries: Spain; Argentina
- Language: Spanish

Goodbye Madrid (Spanish: Adiós Madrid) is a 2024 drama film directed by Diego Corsini. It stars Luciano Cáceres.

== Plot ==
Ramiro travels to Madrid to take a decision on the fate of his father Edgardo, who is in a coma and had been absent from Ramiro's life since long ago. In Madrid, he comes across Edgardo's friends and becomes acquainted with the city.

== Cast ==
- Luciano Cáceres as Ramiro
- Javier Godino as Julio
- Mónica Solaun as Paola
- Fariba Sheikhan as Francesca
- Ramón Esquinas as Ignacio
- Sara Vega as Elisa
- Nacho Marraco as Carlos
- Ingrid Rubio as Beatriz

== Production ==
Based on an original story by Mariana Cangas, the screenplay was written by Cangas and Diego Corsini. The film is a Spanish-Argentine co-production by Madco and Cinescalas and it had the collaboration of Cineworld. Filming began on 7 July 2023 in Madrid.

== Release ==
The film world premiered at the Madrid Film Festival-PNR on 19 September 2024. It also screened at the 39th Mar del Plata International Film Festival in November 2024. On 17 January 2025, it received a limited theatrical release in Spain by 39 Escalones Films. A 28 August 2025 release date was set for the film's commercial debut in Argentine theatres.

== Reception ==
Carmela López Lobo of La Razón rated Adiós Madrid 3 out of 5 stars, highlighting Cáceres' work as the best thing about the film while singling out the [protagonist's] father's "tiresome" friends, particularly at the beginning of the film, as its worst.

== See also ==
- List of Spanish films of 2025
- List of Argentine films of 2025
