= The Reconquest =

- Theatrical release poster
- Spanish: La reconquista
- Directed by: Jonás Trueba
- Written by: Jonás Trueba
- Produced by: Javier Lafuente
- Starring: Francesco Carril; Itsaso Arana; Candela Recio; Pablo Hoyos; Aura Garrido
- Cinematography: Santiago Racaj
- Edited by: Marta Velasco
- Production company: Los Ilusos Films
- Distributed by: Cine Binario
- Release dates: 22 September 2016 (SSIF); 30 September 2016 (Spain)

The Reconquest (Spanish: La reconquista) is a 2016 Spanish romantic drama film directed by Jonás Trueba which stars Francesco Carril, Itsaso Arana, Candela Recio, Pablo Hoyos and Aura Garrido.

== Plot ==
It is set in Madrid. Manuela and Olmo meet again 15 years after their first love.

== Cast ==
- Francesco Carril as Olmo
- Itsaso Arana as Manuela
- Aura Garrido as Clara
- Candela Recio as Manuela (teenager)
- Pablo Hoyos as Olmo (teenager)

== Production ==
Produced by Los Ilusos Films, the film had the participation of TVE and Movistar+. It was shot on location in Madrid. Santiago Racaj worked as cinematographer, whereas Javier Lafuente took over production duties.

== Release ==
The film was presented on 22 September 2016, screened in the 64th San Sebastián International Film Festival's official selection. Distributed by Cine Binario, it was theatrically released in Spain on 30 September 2016.

== Reception ==
Jonathan Holland of The Hollywood Reporter underscored the film to be "self-indulgent but sharp-eyed", Trueba's most intimate film yet, displaying "sincerity" and "evident love of cinema", yet being "less lively, less fun (and funny)" than prior Trueba's pictures and wondered that it be fun to see Trueba to try to work beyond his Rohmerian comfort zone.

Andrea G. Bermejo of Cinemanía gave the film 4 out 5 stars, assessing that Francesco Carril and Itsaso Arana are able to talk, drink and dance "as if the film were life itself".

Quim Casas of El Periódico de Catalunya scored 4 out of 5 stars, deeming The Reconquest to be "an excellent film about the passage of time and its consequences".

Pere Vall of Fotogramas gave it 4 out of 5 stars, praising the "beautiful" planning of the swing dance scene.

== See also ==
- List of Spanish films of 2016
