= The August Virgin =

- Theatrical release poster
- Spanish: La virgen de agosto
- Directed by: Jonás Trueba
- Written by: Jonás Trueba; Itsaso Arana
- Produced by: Javier Lafuente
- Starring: Itsaso Arana; Vito Sanz; Isabelle Stoffel; Joe Manjón; Mikele Urroz; Luis Heras; María Herrador; Naiara Carmona
- Cinematography: Santiago Racaj
- Edited by: Marta Velasco
- Production companies: La virgen de agosto, A.I.E.; Los Ilusos Films, S.L.
- Distributed by: BTeam Pictures
- Release date: 15 August 2019 (Spain)
- Running time: 129 minutes
- Country: Spain
- Language: Spanish

The August Virgin (Spanish: La virgen de agosto) is a 2019 Spanish drama film directed by Jonás Trueba which stars Itsaso Arana. The film was written by Trueba alongside Arana.

== Plot ==
Eva, an out-of-work actress aged 33 who is on her own, decides not to go away during the heat of August but to stay in Madrid, where a friend lets her have the use of his central apartment. She resolves to get to know the city and its inhabitants by just letting things happen. Wandering about the streets and dropping into bars, she meets old friends and makes new friends, both men and women.

Walking home in the early hours, she sees a man she fears is going to jump from a bridge and she hastily starts a conversation to distract him. He is Agos, who was just having a quiet cigarette before going to the bar where his girlfriend works. The Next evening, Eva follows Agos into the bar and continues the conversation. He is an out-of-work actor, separated from his wife and little daughter, who lives by odd jobs in bars. She goes back to his flat and they make love, after which she admits that she is pregnant. Later, when his daughter asks who the father is and Eva replies that she does not know, the little girl says that's just like the Virgin Mary.

== Cast ==
- Itsaso Arana as Eva
- Vito Sanz
- Isabelle Stoffel
- Joe Manjón
- Mikele Urroz
- Luis Heras
- María Herrador
- Naiara Carmona

== Production ==
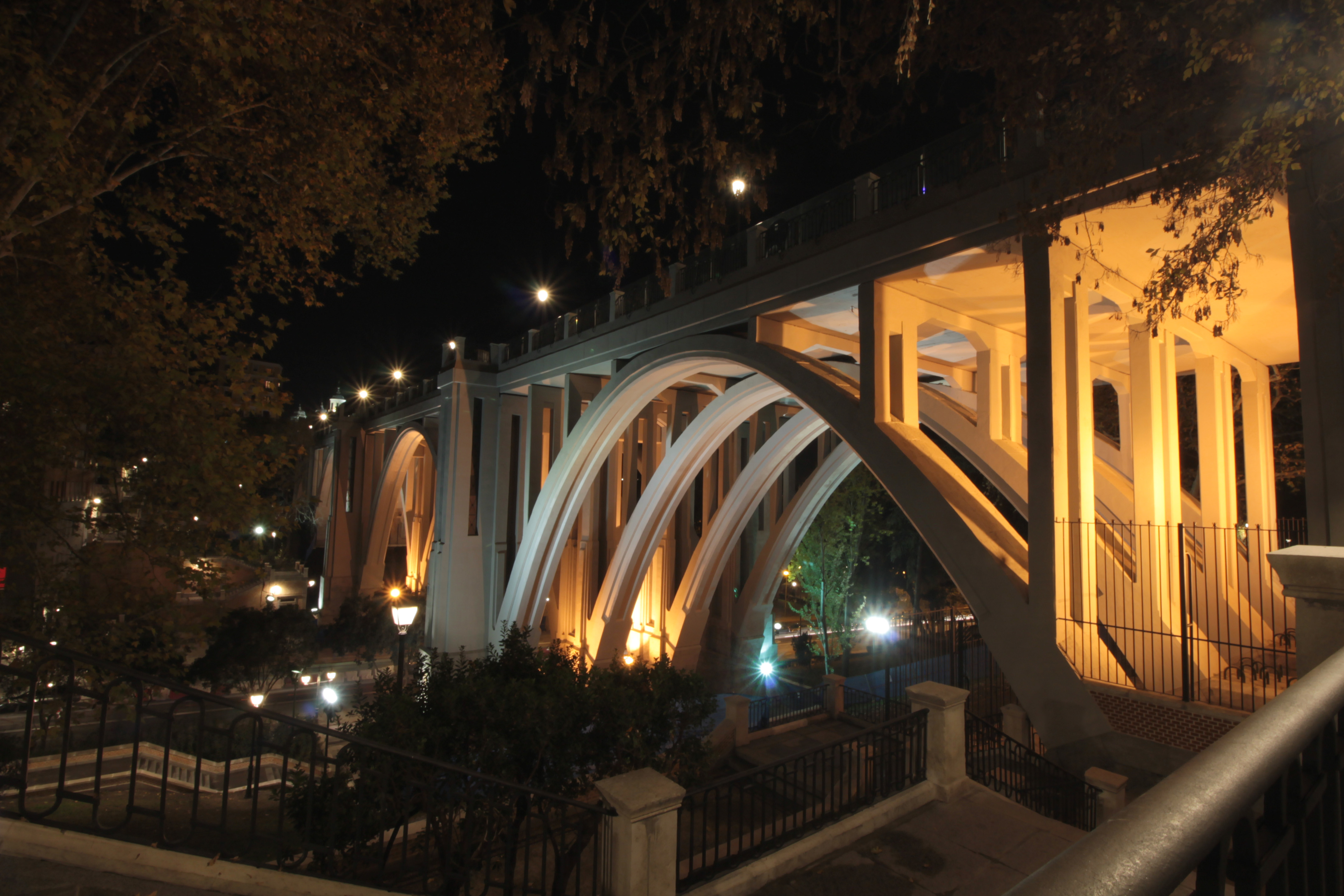
The Segovia Viaduct is featured in the movie.

The August Virgin was written by director Jonás Trueba alongside leading actress Itsaso Arana. The crew was completed by the likes of Santiago Racaj (cinematography), Marta Velasco (editing), Miguel Ángel Rebollo (art direction) and Laura Renau (costume direction).

The film was produced by Los Ilusos Films and La Virgen de Agosto AIE, and it had the participation from ICAA, the regional administration and Telemadrid. It was fully shot in Madrid in the Summer of 2018, from late July to mid August, during the verbenas of San Cayetano, San Lorenzo, and La Paloma.

Some of the outdoor locations include the Plaza de Cascorro, Plaza de Gabriel Miró, Plaza de la Paja, Calle de Argumosa, Calle de Santa Ana, Calle de las Dos Hermanas, the Temple of Debod, Las Vistillas, Calle de Bailén, the Sabatini Gardens, the Círculo de Bellas Artes, Madrid Río or the Segovia Viaduct.

== Release ==
The August Virgin made its world premiere at the 54th Karlovy Vary International Film Festival (28 June – 6 July 2019), as part of the festival's competitive lineup. Distributed by BTeam Pictures, the film was theatrically released in Spain on 15 August 2019. It premiered in France on 5 August 2020.

== Awards and nominations ==
Year	Award	Category	Nominee(s)	Result	Ref.
2019	24th Toulouse Spanish Film Festival	Best Actress	Itsaso Arana	Won	
2019	24th Toulouse Spanish Film Festival	Best Screenplay	Jonás Trueba & Itsaso Arana	Won	
2020	7th Feroz Awards	Best Film Poster	Laura Renau	Nominated	
2021	46th César Awards	Best Foreign Film		Nominated	

== See also ==
- List of Spanish films of 2019
