= 1978 (film) =

- Directed by: Luciano Onetti; Nicolas Onetti
- Written by: Luciano Onetti; Nicolas Onetti
- Produced by: Luciano Onetti; Carlos Goitia
- Starring: Agustin Olcense; Mario Alarcon
- Cinematography: Luciano Montes De Oca
- Edited by: Luciano Onetti; Nicolas Onetti
- Music by: Luciano Onetti
- Production company: Black Mandala
- Release dates: 9 December 2024 (Buenos Aires Rojo Sangre); March 2025 (Argentina)
- Country: Argentina
- Language: Spanish

1978 is a 2024 Argentinian horror film directed by Luciano and Nicolas Onetti and started by Agustin Pardella, Carlos Portaluppi, Mario Alarcon, Agustin Olcense, Maria Eugenia Rigon, Paula Silva among others. It's produced by black Mandala productions.

Set in 1978 in the final game between the Netherlands and Argentina, a paramilitary squadron kidnapped the wrong people, a deadly cult.

The movie had a domestic release in the Mar del Plata International Film Festival 2024, and afterwards in Buenos Aires Rojo festival of 2024 edition.

The release date in Argentine theaters was to be in March 2025.

== Plot ==
During the 1978 FIFA World Cup Final between Argentina and the Netherlands, at the height of the military dictatorship, a group of torturers violently breaks into a home and abducts young people, taking them to a clandestine detention center.

What begins as a brutal interrogation soon turns into a nightmare—the captors have chosen the wrong victims. The abducted individuals belong to a dark cult controlled by an unknown supernatural force.

== Principal cast ==
Augusto Pardella as Hugo

Carlos Portaluppi as Carancho

Agustin Olcense as Miguel

Santiago Rios as Alsina

Jorge Lorenzo as Baviera

Mario Alarcon as Moro

Paula Silva as Irene

Maria Eugenia Rigon as Diana

== Release date ==
The movie had a domestic release in The Buenos Aires Rojo Sangre Festival in November 2024.

It was also screened in the Venezuelan horror festival El Grito.

The movie was to be released in Argentina theaters in March 2025.

== Critical reception ==
Critics throwback the script and the effects.

Rotten Tomatoes gave 50% of approval from 30 critics.

The website Surgeon of Horror praised the movie with these words "its methodical pacing, relentless, brutality and grotesque atmosphere can be overwhelming".

Scream Anarchy praised the special effects in the movie with the following words, "There is a good share of gore and violence that happens in the back half of the movie. The special effects by Onetti Brothers regular Yanel Castellano and newcomer to the fold, Melisa Ontivero, are good. This includes a moment when another regular Maria Eugenia Rigon (Abrakadabra, Scars) and her co-star Justina Ceballos neuter a member of the death squad".
