= Carlos Vermut =

Spanish filmmaker and illustrator

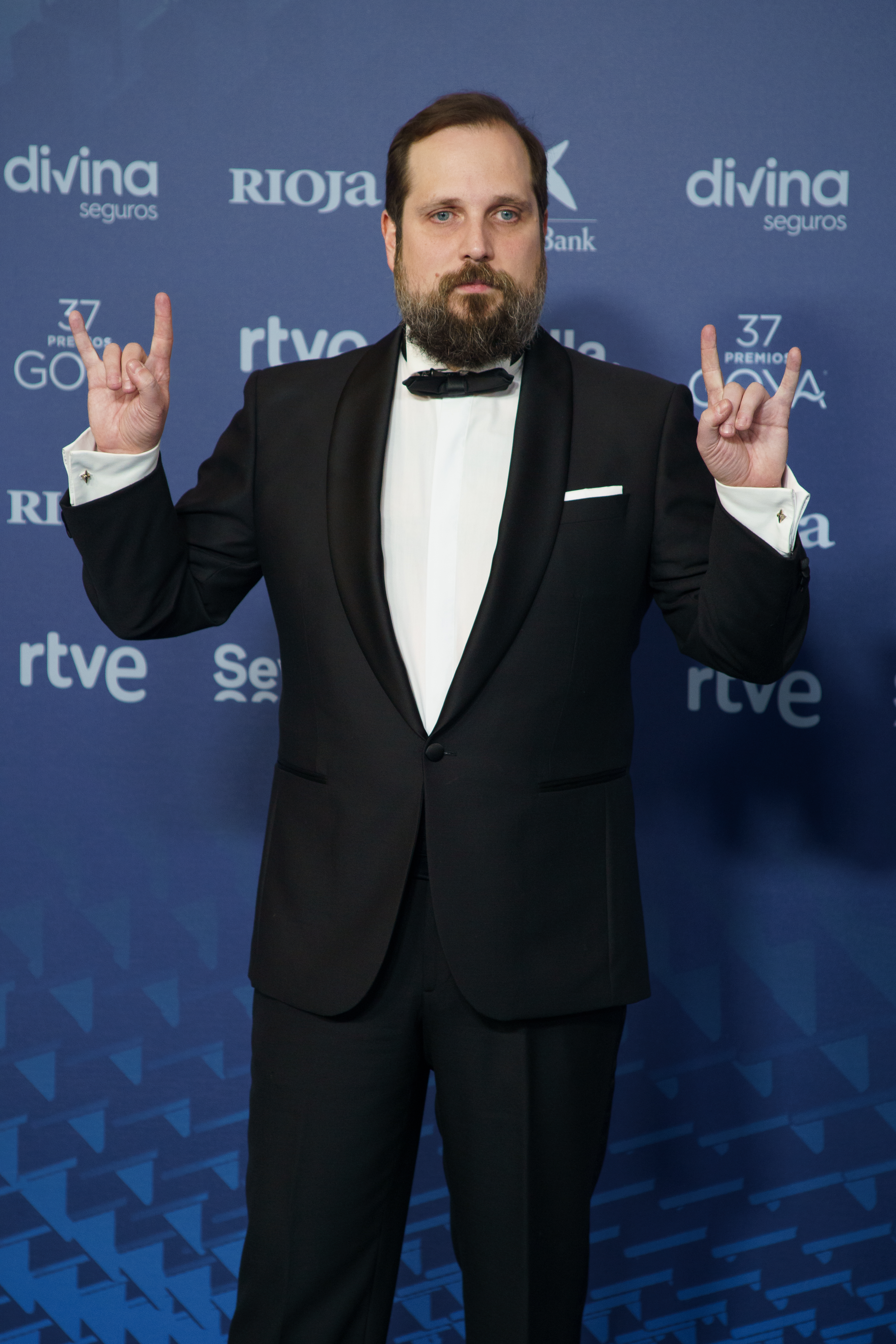
- Vermut at the 37th Goya Awards in 2023
- Born: Carlos López del Rey; 1980 (age 44–45); Madrid, Spain
- Occupations: Film director; screenwriter; illustrator

Carlos López del Rey (born 1980), known professionally as Carlos Vermut, is a Spanish filmmaker. Born in Madrid, he worked as illustrator, comic book artist and storyboard designer prior to filmmaking. Following his involvement in the animated television series Jelly Jamm, he made his feature film debut with Diamond Flash. His sophomore feature Magical Girl (2014) earned critical acclaim. He has since directed and written Quién te cantará (2018) and Manticore (2022), as well as penned the script of The Grandmother (2021).

== Sexual abuse allegations ==
In January and February 2024, El País published allegations by six women accusing Vermut of sexual abuse from 2012 to 2024. In September 2024, Vermut issued a statement through his legal representative denying ever engaging in non-consensual sexual practice, emphasising that no official investigation had been conducted against him to date, and stating that he was not made aware of the details of the allegations when El País contacted him, and that it misrepresented his response as though he was. The statement indicated that Vermut and his lawyer were deliberating legal action against El País. In December 2025, Vermut announced that he had filed with the judiciary a complaint against El País and the journalists who wrote the 2024 articles.

== Works ==
Feature films

Year	Title	Director	Writer	Notes	Ref.
2011	Diamond Flash	Yes	Yes	Also cinematographer and editor	
2014	Magical Girl	Yes	Yes		
2018	Quién te cantará	Yes	Yes		
2021	The Grandmother (La abuela)	No	Yes		
2022	Mantícora (Manticore)	Yes	Yes		
2023	La imatge permanent (The Permanent Picture)	No	Yes	Writing collaboration	
TBD	Mañana serás mi muerte	Yes	TBD		

== Accolades ==
Year	Award	Category	Nominated work	Result	Ref.
2014	62nd San Sebastián International Film Festival	Golden Shell (Best Film)	Magical Girl	Won	
2014	62nd San Sebastián International Film Festival	Silver Shell (Best Director)	Magical Girl	Won	
2015	2nd Feroz Awards	Best Director	Magical Girl	Nominated	
2015	2nd Feroz Awards	Best Screenplay	Magical Girl	Won	
2015	29th Goya Awards	Best Director	Magical Girl	Nominated	
2015	29th Goya Awards	Best Original Screenplay	Magical Girl	Nominated	
2019	6th Feroz Awards	Best Director	Quién te cantará	Nominated	
2019	6th Feroz Awards	Best Screenplay	Quién te cantará	Nominated	
2019	6th Feroz Awards	Best Film Poster	Quién te cantará	Won	
2023	10th Feroz Awards	Best Film Poster	Manticore	Won	
2023	37th Goya Awards	Best Director	Manticore	Nominated	
2023	37th Goya Awards	Best Original Screenplay	Manticore	Nominated	
