= Jonás Trueba =

Spanish filmmaker

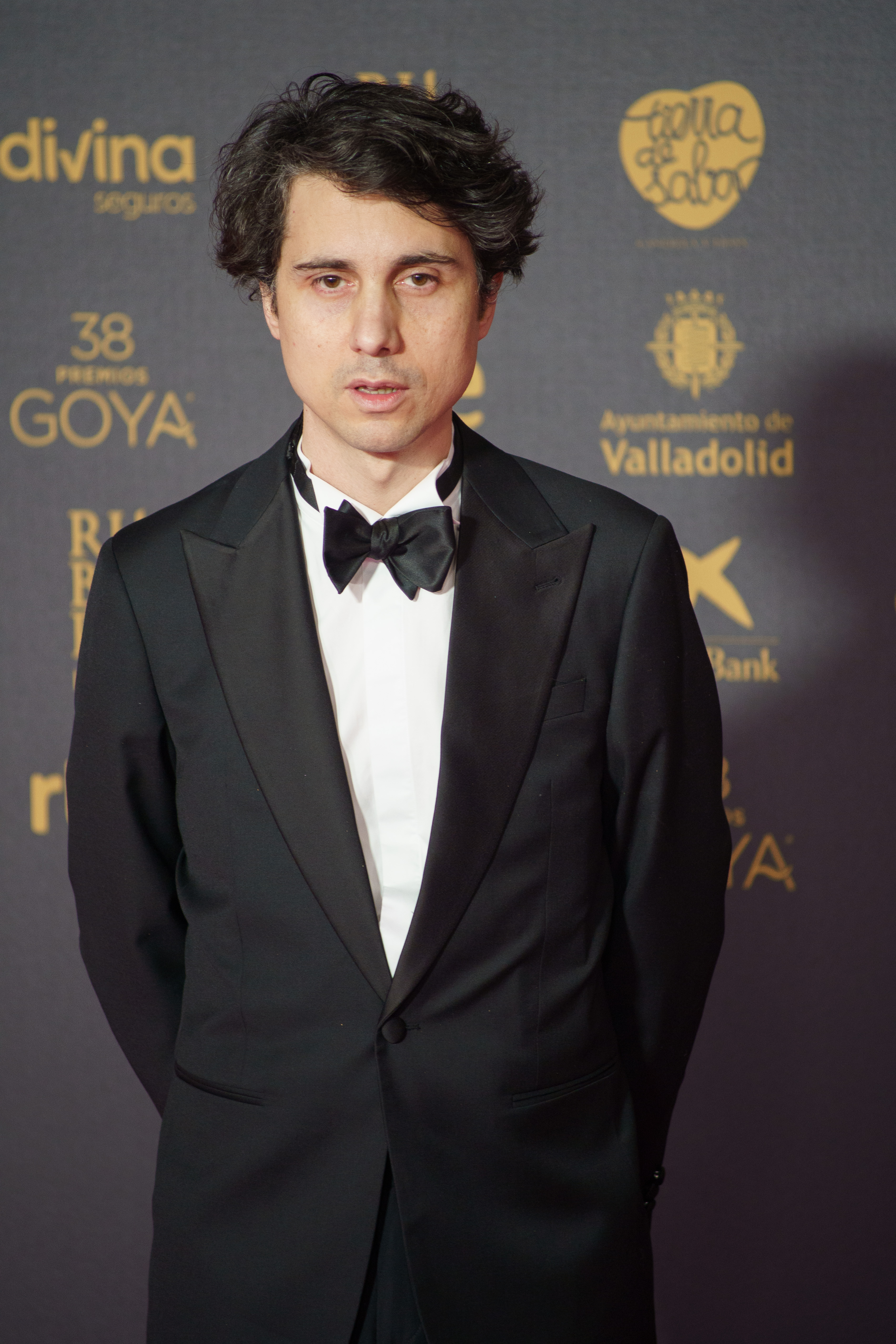
- Trueba in 2024
- Born: Jonás Groucho Rodríguez Huete; 1981 (age 44–45); Madrid, Spain
- Occupations: Film director; screenwriter; producer
- Parents: Fernando Trueba (father); Cristina Huete (mother)
- Relatives: David Trueba (uncle)
- Website: Official Website

Jonás Trueba (born 1981) is a Spanish filmmaker.

== Biography ==
Born in Madrid in 1981, Jonás Groucho Rodríguez Huete is the son of Fernando Trueba and Cristina Huete. Prior to his directorial debut in a feature film with Every Song Is About Me (2010), he directed the 2000 short film Cero en conciencia and collaborated as a writer in films such as No Pain, No Gain (2001), Go Away from Me (2006), and The Dancer and the Thief (2009). Following the production of the 2013 film The Wishful Thinkers, Trueba founded a production company (Los Ilusos Films) alongside Javier Lafuente. He was recognised with the Ojo Crítico Award in 2016.

== Filmography ==
Year	English Title	Original title	Director	Writer	Producer	Notes
2001	No Pain, No Gain	Más pena que gloria	No	Yes	No	Credited as "Jonás Groucho"
2006	Go Away from Me	Vete de mí	No	Yes	No	
2009	The Dancer and the Thief	El baile de la Victoria	No	Yes	No	
2010	Every Song Is About Me	Todas las canciones hablan de mí	Yes	Yes	No	
2013	The Wishful Thinkers	Los ilusos	Yes	Yes	Yes	
2015	The Romantic Exiles	Los exiliados románticos	Yes	Yes	No	
2016	The Reconquest	La reconquista	Yes	Yes	No	
2019	The August Virgin	La virgen de agosto	Yes	Yes	No	
2021	Who's Stopping Us (Note: On 2018, early rough cuts of the film were screened exclusively on various film festivals and were named as a series of the same title and divided into 4 chapters: "Principiantes", "Solo Somos", "Si vamos 28, volvemos 28" & "Tu también lo has vivido”)	Quién lo impide	Yes	Yes	No	Documentary film Also cinematographer
2022	You Have to Come and See It	Tenéis que venir a verla	Yes	Yes	Yes	
2024	The Other Way Around	Volveréis	Yes	Yes	Yes	
