= List of Sony Pictures Releasing International films =

The following is a list of films distributed by Sony Pictures Releasing International (formerly known as Columbia TriStar Film Distributors International) internationally.

== 1980s ==
Release date	Title	Distributor	Notes
September 30, 1988	Don Bosco	Columbia Tri-Star Films Italia	Italian distribution only; produced by Elle Di Ci Cinematografica and Tiber Cinematografica
December 16, 1988	Caruso Pascoski, Son of a Pole	Columbia Tri-Star Films Italia	Italian distribution only; produced by Cecchi Gori Group
December 21, 1988	Compagni di scuola	Columbia Tri-Star Films Italia	Italian distribution only; produced by Cecchi Gori Group
March 10, 1989	The Church	Columbia Tri-Star Films Italia	Italian distribution only; produced by ADC and Cecchi Gori Group Tiger Cinematografica
April 30, 1989	Marrakech Express	Columbia Tri-Star Films Italia	Italian distribution only; produced by A.M.A. Film

== 1990s ==
Release date	Title	Distributor	Notes
October 26, 1990	Graveyard Shift	Columbia Tri-Star Film Distributors International	select international distribution only; produced by Sugar Entertainment, Inc. and Graveyard, Inc.
February 14, 1991	The Silence of the Lambs	Columbia Tri-Star Film Distributors International	select international distribution only; produced by Orion Pictures and Strong Heart Productions
October 9, 1991	The Indian Runner	Columbia Tri-Star Film Distributors International	international distribution only; produced by The Mount Film Group and Mico/NHK Enterprises
November 16, 1991	The Addams Family	Columbia Tri-Star Film Distributors International	international distribution with Orion Pictures only; produced by Paramount Pictures
January 16, 1992	Knight Moves	Columbia Tri-Star Film Distributors International	select international distribution only; produced by Republic Pictures
February 7, 1992	Medicine Man	Columbia Tri-Star Film Distributors International	select international distribution only; produced by Cinergi Pictures
February 26, 1992	Vacas	Columbia Tri-Star Films de España	Spanish distribution only; produced by Sogetel and Sogepaq
January 27, 1993	Beck – De gesloten kamer	Columbia TriStar Film Distributors International	Belgian distribution only; produced by Prime Time
February 12, 1993	Why Do They Call It Love When They Mean Sex?	Columbia Tri-Star Films de España	Spanish distribution only; produced by Audiovisuales Neblí and Cristal PC
April 23, 1993	Huidos	Columbia Tri-Star Films de España	Spanish distribution only; produced by Sancho Gracia PC
July 28, 1993	Robin Hood: Men in Tights	Columbia TriStar Film Distributors International	international distribution outside France, Switzerland and Spain only; produced by Brooksfilms and Gaumont
September 3, 1993	Fortress	Columbia TriStar Film Distributors International	select international distribution only; produced by Davis Entertainment Company and Village Roadshow Pictures
November 5, 1993	RoboCop 3	Columbia TriStar Film Distributors International	international distribution only; produced by Orion Pictures
December 3, 1993	Pretty Princess	Columbia TriStar Films Italia	Italian distribution only; produced by Video 80 and Reteitalia
February 4, 1994	Gunmen	Columbia TriStar Film Distributors International	select international distribution only; produced by Davis Entertainment Company and Gray Gunmen Productions
April 14, 1994	Alegre ma non troppo	Columbia TriStar Films de España	Spanish distribution only; produced by Antena 3 Televisión and Fernando Colomo Producciones Cinematográficas S.L.
April 29, 1994	Escape from Absolom	Columbia TriStar Film Distributors International	international distribution outside the U.K., Ireland, Turkey, Poland and the CIS only; produced by Allied Filmmakers and Pacific Western
July 29, 1994	Barcelona	Columbia TriStar Film Distributors International	distribution in Latin America, the Benelux, Australia, New Zealand and Asia excluding Japan only; produced by Castle Rock Entertainment
August 19, 1994	Andre	Columbia TriStar Film Distributors International	distribution in Latin America, Australia, New Zealand and Asia excluding Japan with Turner Pictures only; produced by Paramount Pictures and The Kushner-Locke Company
October 14, 1994	It's All Lies	Columbia TriStar Films de España	Spanish distribution only; produced by Atrium Productions
November 18, 1994	The Swan Princess	Columbia TriStar Film Distributors International	international distribution only; produced by Nest Entertainment and Rich Animation Studios
December 16, 1994	The Turkish Passion	Columbia TriStar Films de España	Spanish distribution only; produced by LolaFilms
December 23, 1994	Street Fighter	Columbia TriStar Film Distributors International	international distribution under Columbia Pictures only; produced by Edward R. Pressman Productions and Capcom Co. Ltd.
January 6, 1995	Shallow Grave	Columbia TriStar Film Distributors International	select international distribution only; produced by Figment Films
April 21, 1995	You Shall Die in Chafarinas	Columbia TriStar Films de España	Spanish distribution only; produced by Altube Filmeak
September 8, 1995	A House on the Outskirts	Columbia TriStar Films de España	Spanish distribution only; produced by Pedro Costa PC and Atrium Productions
November 3, 1995	All Things Fair	Columbia TriStar Films (Sweden) AB	Swedish distribution only; produced by Per Holst Filmproduktion, Det Danske Filminstitut and Nordisk Film & TV-Fond
December 15, 1995	Jeffrey	Columbia TriStar Film Distributors International	distribution in Latin America, Australia, New Zealand, Asia Pacific and select European territories only; produced by the Booking Office
January 18, 1996	The Usual Suspects	Columbia TriStar Film Distributors International	distribution in Germany, Austria, Switzerland, Eastern Europe, Australia, New Zealand and India only; produced by PolyGram Filmed Entertainment, Bad Hat Harry Films, Blue Parrot Productions and Spelling Films International
February 2, 1996	Bits and Pieces	Columbia TriStar Films Italia	Italian distribution only; produced by Fandango, Colorado Film, RAI
April 24, 1996	We All Fall Down	Columbia TriStar Films Italia	Italian distribution only; produced by Hera International Film
May 17, 1996	África	Columbia TriStar Films de España	Spanish distribution only; produced by Sogetel and Bocaboca Producciones
September 27, 1996	2 Days in the Valley	Columbia TriStar Film Distributors International	distribution in France, Germany, Austria, Italy, Turkey, Hungary, the Czech Republic and India only; produced by Rysher Entertainment
November 27, 1996	The Dog in the Manger	Columbia TriStar Films de España	Spanish distribution only; produced by Enrique Cerezo PC, Cartel and Lolafilms
December 25, 1996	Michael	Columbia TriStar Film Distributors International	distribution in Latin America, the Benelux, Australia, New Zealand and Asia excluding Japan only; produced by Turner Pictures and Alphaville Films
January 10, 1997	Turbulence	Columbia TriStar Film Distributors International	French, German, Austrian and Italian distribution only; produced by Rysher Entertainment
January 10, 1997	Love Can Seriously Damage Your Health	Columbia TriStar Films de España	Spanish distribution only; produced by Sogetel, BocaBoca Producciones, Le Studio Canal+ and DMVB Films
January 30, 1997	Excuse Me Darling, but Lucas Loved Me	Columbia TriStar Films de España	Spanish distribution only; produced by Sogetel and Cristal PC
February 28, 1997	¿De qué se ríen las mujeres?	Columbia TriStar Films de España	Spanish distribution only; produced by BocaBoca
March 26, 1997	Cats Don't Dance	Columbia TriStar Film Distributors International	distribution in Latin America, the Benelux, Italy, Australia, New Zealand and Asia excluding Japan only; produced by Turner Feature Animation and David Kirschner Productions
April 4, 1997	Tramway to Malvarrosa	Columbia TriStar Films de España	Spanish distribution only; produced by Lola Films and Sogetel
April 10, 1997	The Wind in the Willows	Columbia TriStar Film Distributors International	international distribution outside the U.K. and Ireland only; produced by Allied Filmmakers
July 19, 1997	The Swan Princess: Escape from Castle Mountain	Columbia TriStar Film Distributors International	international distribution only; produced by Nest Entertainment and Rich Animation Studios
August 24, 1997	Albino Alligator	Columbia TriStar Film Distributors International	select international distribution only; produced by the Motion Picture Corporation of America
October 3, 1997	The Locusts	Columbia TriStar Film Distributors International	international distribution only; produced by Orion Pictures and Renegade Films
November 6, 1997	Heaven's Burning	Columbia TriStar Film Distributors International	distribution in Latin America, Portugal, Greece, Cyprus, Eastern Europe, South Africa and select Asian territories only
December 25, 1997	An American Werewolf in Paris	Columbia TriStar Film Distributors International	Spanish, Benelux and Scandinavian distribution only; produced by Cometstone Pictures
January 22, 1998	Pippi Longstocking	Columbia TriStar Film Distributors International	German distribution only; produced by Nelvana Limited, Svensk Filmindustri, IdunaFilm and TFC Trickompany
February 6, 1998	Little Bird	Columbia TriStar Films de España	Spanish distribution only; produced by Filmart
March 13, 1998	Torrente, the Dumb Arm of the Law	Columbia TriStar Films de España	Spanish distribution only; produced by Rocabruno, Creativos Asociados de Radio y Televisión and Vía Digital
March 19, 1998	A Little Bit of Soul	Columbia TriStar Film Distributors International	Australian and New Zealand distribution only; produced by Beyond Films and Faust Films Pty. Ltd.
June 2, 1998	Killing Time	Columbia TriStar Film Distributors International	international distribution only; produced by Pilgrim Films and Metrodome Films
June 12, 1998	A Perfect Couple	Columbia TriStar Films de España	Spanish distribution only; produced by Lolafilms, Cartel and Vía Digital
September 24, 1998	Dog Park	Columbia TriStar Film Distributors International	distribution in Latin America, the U.K., Ireland, Australia, New Zealand, South Africa, France, the Benelux, Spain, Germany, Austria, Eastern Europe and Japan only; produced by Independent Pictures and Accent Entertainment
November 27, 1998	Hi-Life	Columbia TriStar Film Distributors International	distribution in the U.K., Ireland, Australia, New Zealand, South Africa, France, the Benelux and Eastern Europe only; produced by Gun for Hire Films
December 2, 1998	Disturbing Behavior	Columbia TriStar Film Distributors International	international distribution outside Germany and Austria only; produced by Metro-Goldwyn-Mayer and Beacon Communications
December 18, 1998	A Time for Defiance	Columbia TriStar Films de España	Spanish distribution only; produced by Antena 3, Vía Digital and Enrique Cerezo
January 22, 1999	Between Your Legs	Columbia TriStar Films de España	Spanish distribution only; produced by Lola Films, S.A.
February 26, 1999	Yerma	Columbia TriStar Films de España	Spanish distribution only; produced by Artimagen Producciones
March 5, 1999	Lock, Stock and Two Smoking Barrels	Columbia TriStar Film Distributors International	distribution in Latin America, South Africa, Greece, Cyprus, Poland, the Czech Republic, Slovakia, Hungary, Bulgaria, the Middle East, Israel and Asia only; produced by HandMade Films, SKA Films and The Steve Tisch Company
April 23, 1999	Outlaw	Columbia TriStar Films Italia	Italian distribution only; produced by Hera International Film
June 25, 1999	Pyaar Mein Kabhi Kabhi	Columbia TriStar Film Distributors International	Indian film; distribution only; produced by Percept Picture Company
October 1, 1999	Tsatsiki, morsan och polisen	Columbia TriStar Films (Sweden) AB	Swedish distribution only; produced by Danmarks Radio, Felicia Film, Per Holst Filmproduktion, Ríkisútvarpið-Sjónvarp and TV 1000
October 22, 1999	Bats	Columbia TriStar Film Distributors International	international distribution only; produced by Destination Films
November 5, 1999	The Bone Collector	Columbia TriStar Film Distributors International	international distribution under Columbia Pictures only; produced by Universal Pictures and Bregman Productions
December 12, 1999	Simon Sez	Columbia TriStar Film Distributors International	international distribution only; produced by Independent Artists and Signature Films

== 2000s ==
Release date	Title	Distributor	Notes
April 14, 2000	American Psycho	Columbia TriStar Film Distributors International	distribution in South Africa, Spain, Portugal, Eastern Europe, the CIS, Australia, New Zealand, India and Thailand only; produced by Pressman Film and Muse Productions
August 25, 2000	The Crew	Columbia TriStar Film Distributors International	international distribution outside the Benelux, Germany, Austria, Switzerland, Turkey, the Nordics, Greece, Cyprus, Eastern Europe and the CIS only; produced by Sonnenfeld-Josephson Worldwide Entertainment
September 15, 2000	A Dog's Will	Columbia TriStar Film Distributors International	Brazilian distribution only; produced by Globo Filmes and Lereby Produções
September 15, 2000	Almost Famous	Columbia TriStar Film Distributors International	international distribution under Columbia Pictures only; produced by DreamWorks Pictures and Vinyl Films
September 22, 2000	Before the Storm	Columbia TriStar Films (Sweden) AB	Swedish distribution only; produced by Illusion Film & Television
October 4, 2000	The Crimson Rivers	Columbia TriStar Film Distributors International	international distribution outside France, Germany, Austria, Switzerland, Italy, Japan, Korea and Taiwan only; produced by Gaumont, Légende Entreprises, TF1 Films Production and Canal+
October 11, 2000	Living It Up	Columbia TriStar Films de España	Spanish distribution only; produced by BocaBoca Producciones
October 27, 2000	You're the One	Columbia TriStar Films de España	Spanish distribution only; produced by Nickel Odeon Dos S.A.
December 25, 2000	An Everlasting Piece	Columbia TriStar Film Distributors International	international distribution under Columbia Pictures only; produced by DreamWorks Pictures, Bayahibe Films and Baltimore Spring/Creek Pictures
February 1, 2001	Hostile Takeover	Columbia TriStar Film Gmbh	German distribution under Columbia Pictures only; produced by MPS Mediaproductions
April 11, 2001	Just Visiting	Columbia TriStar Film Distributors International	select international distribution only; produced by Gaumont and Hughes Entertainment
May 4, 2001	The Hold-Up	Columbia TriStar Films de España	Spanish distribution only; produced by BocaBoca Producciones
May 11, 2001	Shadow of the Vampire	Columbia TriStar Films (Sweden) AB	Swedish theatrical distribution only; produced by BBC Films and Saturn Films
June 8, 2001	Evolution	Columbia TriStar Film Distributors International	international distribution under Columbia Pictures only; produced by DreamWorks Pictures and The Montecito Picture Company
November 30, 2001	Monsoon Wedding	Columbia TriStar Films India	Indian theatrical distribution only; produced by iDream Productions, IFC Productions, Mirabai Films, Paradis Films, Key Films and Pandora Filmproduktion
January 25, 2002	Un amore perfetto	Columbia TriStar Films Italia	Italian distribution only; produced by Rita Rusic Company and Movieweb S.p.a.
January 25, 2002	Reflections	Columbia TriStar Films de España	Spanish distribution only; produced by Calle Cruzada, Ensueño Films and Vía Interactiva
February 8, 2002	Rollerball	Columbia TriStar Film Distributors International	international distribution outside Italy, Germany, Austria and Japan under Columbia Pictures only; produced by Metro-Goldwyn-Mayer and Mosaic Media Group
March 8, 2002	The Bankers of God: The Calvi Affair	Columbia TriStar Films Italia	Italian distribution only; produced by Sistina Cinematografica, Metropolis Film and Rai Cinema
June 5, 2002	The Dark Side of the Heart 2	Columbia TriStar Films de España	Spanish distribution only; produced by Enrique Cerezo PC, Tornasol Films and Argentina Sonfilm
June 14, 2002	X	Columbia TriStar Films de España	Spanish distribution only; produced by BocaBoca
July 12, 2002	Bend It Like Beckham	Columbia TriStar Films India	Indian co-distribution with iDream Productions only; produced by Kintop Pictures, Bend It Films, Roc Media and Road Movies Filmproduktion
August 16, 2002	The Crime of Padre Amaro	Columbia TriStar Film Distributors International	select international distribution only; produced by Almeda Films, Blu Films and Wanda Films
August 30, 2002	FeardotCom	Columbia TriStar Film Distributors International	select international distribution only; produced by MDP Worldwide
September 20, 2002	Mad Love	Columbia TriStar Films Italia	Italian distribution only; produced by Enrique Cerezo PC, Pedro Costa PC, Production Group, Sogepaq and Take 2000
October 25, 2002	Story of a Kiss	Columbia TriStar Films de España	Spanish distribution only; produced by Nickel Odeon Dos, Enrique Cerezo PC and PC 29
January 31, 2003	God Is Brazilian	Columbia TriStar Film Distributors International	Brazilian distribution only; produced by Luz Mágica Produções, Tele Image and Globo Filmes
March 28, 2003	Moscow Gold	Columbia TriStar Films de España	Spanish distribution only; produced Enrique Cerezo PC, Arriábala and Amiguetes Entertainment
May 4, 2003	The Pact of Silence	Columbia TriStar Film Distributors International	French and Belgian distribution under Columbia Pictures only; produced by Légende Entreprises
June 13, 2003	The Man Who Copied	Columbia TriStar Film Distributors International	Brazilian distribution under Columbia Pictures only; Casa de Cinema de Porto Alegre and Globo Filmes
July 2, 2003	Terminator 3: Rise of the Machines	Columbia TriStar Film Distributors International	international distribution outside the Middle East, Korea and Japan under Columbia Pictures only; produced by C2 Pictures, Intermedia Films and Mostow/Lieberman Productions
September 12, 2003	Dogville	Columbia TriStar Films (Sweden) AB	Swedish theatrical distribution only; produced by Nordisk Film, Filmek AB, Zoma Films UK, Canal+ and France 3 Cinéma
September 26, 2003	Danube Hotel	Columbia TriStar Films de España	Spanish distribution only; produced by Nickel Odeon Dos, Enrique Cerezo PC and PC 29
September 26, 2003	Evil	Columbia TriStar Films (Sweden) AB	Swedish theatrical distribution only; produced by Nordisk Film and Moviola
November 26, 2003	Bad Santa	Columbia TriStar Film Distributors International	distribution in Hispanic America, the U.K., Ireland, Australia, New Zealand, South Africa, France, Germany, Austria, Italy and Spain under Columbia Pictures only; produced by Dimension Films and Triptych Pictures
January 23, 2004	Trileros	Columbia TriStar Films de España	Spanish distribution only; produced by Máscara Films, Ensueño Films and Antena 3 Televisión
April 30, 2004	Envy	Columbia TriStar Film Distributors International	international distribution under Columbia Pictures only; produced by DreamWorks Pictures, Castle Rock Entertainment and Baltimore/Spring Creek Pictures
June 3, 2004	The Punisher	Columbia TriStar Film Distributors International	distribution in Latin America, the U.K., Ireland, Australia, New Zealand, South Africa, France, Germany, Austria, Switzerland, Italy, Spain, the Benelux, Portugal, the Nordics, Greece, Cyprus, Eastern Europe, the Baltics, the CIS, Israel, Japan, Korea, Thailand and the Philippines only; produced by Artisan Entertainment, Marvel Entertainment and Valhalla Motion Pictures
August 27, 2004	Suspect Zero	Columbia TriStar Film Distributors International	international distribution outside Israel and Turkey only; produced by Intermedia Films, Lakeshore Entertainment and Cruise/Wagner Productions
October 1, 2004	Layer Cake	Columbia TriStar Films (UK)	U.K. and Irish distribution under Columbia Pictures only; produced by Marv Films
October 15, 2004	Drowning Ghost	Columbia TriStar Films (Sweden) AB	Swedish theatrical distribution only; produced by Greta Film AB, Nordisk Film Production, Moviola Film och Television AB and SFI
November 12, 2004	Say I Do	Columbia TriStar Films de España	Spanish distribution under Columbia Pictures only; produced by Columbia Films Producciones Españolas and Zebra Producciones
January 7, 2005	Tainá 2: A New Amazon Adventure	Columbia TriStar Film Distributors International	Brazilian distribution under Columbia Pictures only
April 22, 2005	The Brown Bunny	Sony Pictures Releasing International	distribution in the U.K., Ireland, Australia, New Zealand, Italy, Scandinavia, Lebanon, Israel, Turkey and Asia excluding Japan and Thailand only; produced by Wild Bunch and Vincent Gallo Productions
June 10, 2005	The Adventures of Sharkboy and Lavagirl	Sony Pictures Releasing International	international distribution under Columbia Pictures only; produced by Dimension Films and Troublemaker Studios
June 23, 2005	Mindhunters	Sony Pictures Releasing International	distribution in Latin America, the U.K., Ireland, Australia, New Zealand, France, Portugal, Malaysia, India, Pakistan and Korea only; produced by Intermedia Films, Avenue Pictures, Weed Road Pictures and Outlaw Productions
August 19, 2005	Two Sons of Francisco	Sony Pictures Releasing International	Brazilian distribution under Columbia Pictures only
October 14, 2005	The Prize Winner of Defiance, Ohio	Sony Pictures Releasing International	international distribution outside Scandinavia, Portugal and Israel only; produced by Revolution Studios and ImageMovers
November 23, 2005	Yours, Mine & Ours	Sony Pictures Releasing International	international distribution under Columbia Pictures only; produced by Metro-Goldwyn-Mayer, Paramount Pictures, Nickelodeon Movies and Robert Simonds Productions
April 12, 2006	Kill Your Darlings	Sony Pictures Releasing International	Swedish theatrical distribution only; produced by Nordisk Film
July 20, 2007	Saneamento Básico	Sony Pictures Releasing International	Brazilian distribution under Columbia Pictures only; produced by Globo Filmes
September 21, 2007	Good Luck Chuck	Sony Pictures Releasing International	international distribution outside the U.K., Ireland and the CIS only; produced by Lionsgate and Karz Entertainment
September 21, 2007	Blinkers	Sony Pictures Releasing International	Spanish distribution under Columbia Pictures only; produced by Columbia Films Producciones Españolas, Morena Films and Telecinco Cinema
January 4, 2008	Meu Nome Não É Johnny	Sony Pictures Releasing International	Brazilian distribution under Columbia Pictures only
February 12, 2008	Rambo	Sony Pictures Releasing International	U.K., Irish, Australian and New Zealand distribution only; produced by Millennium Films and Equity Pictures
April 30, 2008	Iron Man	Sony Pictures Releasing International	Japanese and Spanish distribution only; produced by Marvel Studios and Fairview Entertainment
June 20, 2008	The Incredible Hulk	Sony Pictures Releasing International	Japanese and Spanish distribution only; produced by Marvel Studios and Valhalla Motion Pictures
December 4, 2008	Punisher: War Zone	Sony Pictures Releasing International	international distribution only; produced by Lionsgate, Marvel Entertainment, Valhalla Motion Pictures, MHF Zweite Academy Film and SGF Entertainment Inc.
December 25, 2008	The Spirit	Sony Pictures Releasing International	distribution in Latin America, France, Germany, Austria, Switzerland, the Benelux, Italy, Spain, Scandinavia and South Africa only; produced by OddLot Entertainment
January 22, 2009	The Best Movie 2	Sony Pictures Releasing International	Russian distribution under Columbia Pictures only; produced by Monumental Pictures and Comedy Club Production
January 30, 2009	The Hanged Man	Sony Pictures Releasing International	Spanish distribution only; produced by Amigo PC, Lenon Producciones, Ovideo TV and Subotica Entertainment
May 21, 2009	Terminator Salvation	Sony Pictures Releasing International	international distribution outside the Middle East and Korea under Columbia Pictures only; produced by The Halcyon Company and Wonderland Sound and Vision; co-distributed in Japan by Toho-Towa
July 1, 2009	Crank: High Voltage	Sony Pictures Releasing International	distribution in Latin America, France, Italy, Spain, Scandinavia, the Benelux, Australia, New Zealand, Japan and Korea only; produced by Lionsgate, Lakeshore Entertainment and Radical Media
July 11, 2009	Brüno	Sony Pictures Releasing International	distribution in Latin America, France, Spain, Portugal, Greece and Cyprus only; produced by Media Rights Capital, Four by Two Films and Everyman Pictures
July 25, 2009	Once Upon a Time in Rio	Sony Pictures Releasing International	Brazilian distribution only; produced by Conspiração Filmes, Globo Filmes and Lereby Produções
August 7, 2009	A Perfect Getaway	Sony Pictures Releasing International	distribution in Hispanic America, Scandinavia, France, Spain, Italy, Switzerland, South Africa, Israel and India only; produced by Rogue Pictures, Relativity Media and QED International
November 6, 2009	The Men Who Stare at Goats	Sony Pictures Releasing International	distribution in Latin America, Australia, New Zealand, France, Spain and Israel only; produced by Winchester Capital Partners, BBC Films and Smokehouse Pictures

== 2010s ==
Release date	Title	Distributor	Notes
January 14, 2010	Friendship!	Sony Pictures Releasing International	German and Austrian distribution under Columbia Pictures only; produced by Deutsche Columbia Pictures Filmproduktion, Wiedemann & Berg Filmproduktion and Mr. Brown Entertainment
January 22, 2010	Extraordinary Measures	Sony Pictures Releasing International	international distribution outside Germany, Austria and home media and television in German-speaking Switzerland only; produced by CBS Films and Double Feature Films
January 29, 2010	The Book of Eli	Sony Pictures Releasing International	distribution in Latin America, Australia, New Zealand, Spain, Portugal, Scandinavia, South Africa, the Baltics, Hungary, the Czech Republic, Slovakia, Bulgaria, Romania, former Yugoslavia and Asia excluding Japan and Korea only; produced by Alcon Entertainment and Silver Pictures
April 23, 2010	The Back-up Plan	Sony Pictures Releasing International	international distribution outside Germany, Austria and home media and television in German-speaking Switzerland only; produced by CBS Films and Escape Artists
November 1, 2010	Machete	Sony Pictures Releasing International	international distribution outside Italy, the Benelux, Eastern Europe, the Baltics, the CIS, Turkey, Thailand and Korea only; produced by Overnight Films and Troublemaker Studios
January 20, 2011	The Best Movie 3-De	Sony Pictures Releasing International	Russian distribution under Columbia Pictures only; produced by Monumental Pictures and Comedy Club Production
February 17, 2011	Lucky Trouble	Walt Disney Studios Sony Pictures Releasing	Russian distribution only; produced by Bazelevs Company
April 8, 2011	Hanna	Sony Pictures Releasing International	international distribution outside the U.K., Ireland, Australia, New Zealand, Greece, Cyprus, the Middle East, Israel and the CIS only; produced by Focus Features, Studio Babelsberg and Holleran Company
August 26, 2011	The Opposite of Love	Sony Pictures Releasing de España	Spanish distribution only; produced by Zeta Cinema and A3 Films
December 1, 2011	Vysotsky. Thank You For Being Alive	Sony Pictures Releasing International	Russian theatrical distribution under Columbia Pictures only; produced by Monumental Pictures
December 28, 2011	Paranormal Xperience 3D	Sony Pictures Releasing de España	Spanish distribution only; produced by Rodar y Rodar and Antena 3 Films
February 16, 2012	Yoko	Sony Pictures Releasing International	German and Austrian distribution under Columbia Pictures only; produced by Deutsche Columbia Pictures Filmproduktion, blue eyes Fiction and Fido Film AB
April 27, 2012	Winning Streak	Sony Pictures Releasing de España	Spanish distribution only; produced by Alea Docs & Films and Bausan Films
October 26, 2012	The Body	Sony Pictures Releasing de España	Spanish distribution only; produced by Rodar y Rodar, Antena 3 Films, Televisió de Catalunya and Canal+
August 2, 2013	2 Guns	Sony Pictures Releasing International	international distribution outside Latin America, the U.K., Ireland, the Middle East, Turkey and Thailand under Stage 6 Films and TriStar Pictures only; produced by Emmett/Furla Films, Marc Platt Productions, Boom! Studios, Herrick Entertainment, Envision Entertainment and Oasis Ventures
October 4, 2013	Parkland	Sony Pictures Releasing International	distribution in Latin America, Eastern Europe, the Nordics, Greece, Cyprus and Turkey only; produced by Exclusive Media, Playtone, the American Film Company and Millennium Entertainment
October 4, 2013	The To Do List	Sony Pictures Releasing International	distribution in Latin America, the U.K., Ireland, South Africa, Spain, Italy, the Benelux and Asia excluding Thailand only; produced by the Mark Gordon Company and Varsity Pictures
November 1, 2013	Drinking Buddies	Sony Pictures Releasing International	international distribution only; produced by Burn Later Productions
January 10, 2014	Confissões de Adolescente	Sony Pictures Releasing International	Brazilian distribution under Columbia Pictures only; produced by Globo Filmes and Lereby Productions
January 16, 2014	Not My Day	Sony Pictures Releasing International	German and Austrian distribution under Columbia Pictures only; produced by Deutsche Columbia Pictures Filmproduktion, Westside Filmproduktion, Donar Film and Mr. Brown Entertainment
January 16, 2014	Her	Sony Pictures Releasing International	co-distribution in Latin America, Australia, New Zealand, South Africa, Scandinavia, Eastern Europe and pan-Asian pay television with Stage 6 Films only; produced by Annapurna Pictures
March 14, 2014	The Zero Theorem	Sony Pictures Releasing International	co-distribution in all media excluding airlines in the U.K., Ireland, Australia, New Zealand, Spain and Scandinavia only; produced by MediaPro Studios, Zanuck Independent and A&E Productions
May 16, 2014	In Secret	Sony Pictures Releasing International	co-distribution in Latin America, the U.K., Ireland, Germany, Austria, Scandinavia and the Benelux with Stage 6 Films only; produced by LD Entertainment and Exclusive Media Group
July 30, 2014	Chef	Sony Pictures Releasing International	co-distribution in France, Italy, Spain, Scandinavia, the Benelux, China, Japan and Thailand with Stage 6 Films only; produced by Aldamisa Entertainment, Fairview Entertainment, Fetisov Teterin Films, Prescience, Altus Media, Kilburn Media and Fetisov Teterin Films
September 18, 2014	The Skeleton Twins	Sony Pictures Releasing International	co-distribution outside the U.S. with Stage 6 Films only; produced by Duplass Brothers Productions and Venture Forth
September 19, 2014	Tusk	Sony Pictures Releasing International	distribution outside the U.S., the Baltics, the CIS, the Middle East and Asia excluding India only; produced by SModcast Pictures, XYZ Films and Demarest Films
September 25, 2014	Who Am I	Sony Pictures Releasing International	German and Austrian distribution under Columbia Pictures only; produced by Deutsche Columbia Pictures Filmproduktion, Wiedemann & Berg Filmproduktion and SevenPictures Film
October 3, 2014	Torrente 5: Operación Eurovegas	Sony Pictures Releasing de España	Spanish theatrical distribution only; produced by Amiguetes Enterprises, Telefónica Studios, ONO and Atresmedia Cine
October 23, 2014	Whiplash	Sony Pictures Releasing International	uncredited onscreen; co-distribution in Latin America, the U.K., Ireland, Australia, New Zealand, Germany, Austria, Scandinavia, the Benelux, Greece, Cyprus, Spain, Italy, Portugal, South Africa and Eastern Europe with Stage 6 Films only; produced by Blumhouse Productions, Bold Films and Right of Way Films
January 29, 2015	Black Sea	Sony Pictures Releasing International	co-distribution in Latin America, Germany, Austria, German-speaking Switzerland, Eastern Europe and Scandinavia with Stage 6 Films only; produced by Focus Features, Film4 and Cowboy Films
February 20, 2015	Battalion	Sony Pictures Releasing International	Russian distribution under Columbia Pictures only; produced by Corner-Work and Art Pictures Studio
March 22, 2015	Wer	Sony Pictures Releasing International	distribution in Latin America, Scandinavia, Eastern Europe, Australia, New Zealand and South Africa only; produced by Sierra Pictures, Incentive Filmed Entertainment, Prototype and Room 101, Inc.
April 10, 2015	Felices 140	Sony Pictures Releasing de España	Spanish distribution only; produced by Foresta Films
June 19, 2015	It's Now or Never	Sony Pictures Releasing de España	Spanish distribution only; produced by Zeta Cinema and Atresmedia Cine
July 10, 2015	Love & Mercy	Sony Pictures Releasing International	co-distribution in Latin America, the U.K., Ireland, Scandinavia, Eastern Europe, Spain and Italy with Stage 6 Films only; produced by River Road Entertainment and Battle Mountain Films
July 31, 2015	The End of the Tour	Sony Pictures Releasing International	distribution outside the U.S., the Middle East, Turkey, the Benelux, Greece, Cyprus, China, Hong Kong and Taiwan only; produced by Anonymous Content, Kilburn Media and Modern Man Films
August 6, 2015	Dope	Sony Pictures Releasing International	international co-distribution with Stage 6 Films only; produced by Significant Productions, i am OTHER and Revolt Films
September 28, 2015	Man Up	Sony Pictures Releasing International	distribution in Latin America, Eastern Europe, the Nordics, Greece, Cyprus and Turkey only; produced by StudioCanal, Anton Capital Entertainment, BBC Films and Big Talk Productions
October 22, 2015	The Lobster	Sony Pictures Releasing International	distribution in Latin America, Australia, New Zealand, Germany, Austria, Switzerland, the Nordics, Eastern Europe, the Baltics, the CIS and Israel only; produced by the BFI, Film4, Element Pictures, Faliro House Productions, Haut et Court, Scarlet Films and Lemming Film
October 22, 2015	Without Borders	Walt Disney Studios Sony Pictures Releasing	Russian distribution only; produced by Nebo, Yellow, Black and White-Group and STS
November 23, 2015	Mr. Holmes	Sony Pictures Releasing International	Latin American, Nordic and Eastern European distribution only; produced by AI Film, Archer Gray, BBC Films, FilmNation Entertainment and See-Saw Films
December 17, 2015	Help, I Shrunk My Teacher	Sony Pictures Releasing International	German and Austrian distribution under Columbia Pictures only; produced by Deutsche Columbia Pictures Filmproduktion, blue eyes Fiction, Karibufilm and Minifilm
January 7, 2016	The Forest	Sony Pictures Releasing International	co-distribution in Australia, New Zealand, Eastern Europe, Israel, Portugal, the Nordics, South Africa, Spain and Asia excluding Japan with Stage 6 Films only; produced by AI-Film, Lava Bear Films and Phantom Four Films
January 7, 2016	Spotlight	Sony Pictures Releasing International	distribution in all media excluding airlines in Latin America, Scandinavia, Poland, Hungary, the Czech Republic, Slovakia, Romania, Bulgaria, Greece, Cyprus, the Middle East, Israel, Turkey and India only; produced by Participant Media, First Look Media, Anonymous Content and Rocklin/Faust Productions
February 4, 2016	Pride and Prejudice and Zombies	Sony Pictures Releasing International	uncredited onscreen; co-distribution in Latin America, the Nordics and Eastern Europe with Stage 6 Films only; produced by Sierra Pictures, Cross Creek Pictures, Madriver Pictures, QC Entertainment, Allison Shearmur Productions, Handsomecharlie Films and Head Gear Films
March 4, 2016	Rock the Kasbah	Sony Pictures Releasing International	distribution in all media excluding airlines in Latin America, the U.K., Ireland, Spain, Eastern Europe and Asian satellite television only; produced by QED International, Shangri-La Entertainment, Covert Media and Venture Forth
March 11, 2016	Triple 9	Sony Pictures Releasing International	Latin American, Scandinavian and Eastern European co-distribution with Stage 6 Films only; produced by Worldview Entertainment, Sierra Pictures, Anonymous Content, MadRiver Pictures and SureFire Capital
March 17, 2016	Digging for Fire	Sony Pictures Releasing International	international co-distribution with Stage 6 Films only; produced by Lucky Coffee Productions
April 8, 2016	Demolition	Sony Pictures Releasing International	Latin American, Eastern European, Nordic, Greek and Cypriot co-distribution with Stage 6 Films only; produced by Black Label Media, SKE, Mr. Mudd and Right of Way Films
June 16, 2016	Elvis & Nixon	Sony Pictures Releasing International	distribution in all media excluding airlines in Latin America, Eastern Europe, Spain, Portugal, the Nordics and pan-Asian pay television only; produced by Autumn Productions, Elevated Films, Holly Wiersma Productions, Johnny Mac & David Hansen Productions and Benaroya Pictures
August 19, 2016	Boy Missing	Sony Pictures Releasing de España	Spanish distribution only; produced by Rodar y Rodar
September 27, 2016	Hunt for the Wilderpeople	Sony Pictures Releasing International	international co-distribution outside the U.K., Ireland, Australia, New Zealand, France and the Middle East with Stage 6 Films only; produced by Defender Films, Piki Films, Curious and the New Zealand Film Commission
October 6, 2016	The Family Fang	Sony Pictures Releasing International	distribution in Canada, Latin America, the U.K., Ireland, Australia, New Zealand, France, Scandinavia, Spain, Eastern Europe, Greece and Cyprus only; produced by Red Crown Productions, Olympus Pictures, Blossom Films, Aggregate Films, West Madison Entertainment, Minerva Productions and QED International
October 14, 2016	War on Everyone	Sony Pictures Releasing International	distribution in Latin America, Scandinavia, Eastern Europe, the Benelux, Spain, Portugal, Greece, Cyprus, South Africa, Israel, Turkey and Asia excluding Japan and Korea only; produced by the BFI, Bankside Films, Head Gear Films, Kreo Films FZ, Metrol Technology and Reprisal Films
November 3, 2016	Indignation	Sony Pictures Releasing International	distribution in Latin America, the U.K., Ireland, Eastern Europe, the CIS, the Benelux, Spain, India and worldwide airlines only; produced by Likely Story and Symbolic Exchange
November 4, 2016	A Street Cat Named Bob	Sony Pictures Releasing International	co-distribution in all media excluding airlines in Latin America, the U.K., Ireland, Australia, New Zealand, the Nordics, Eastern Europe, the CIS, the Baltics, Spain, Portugal, Greece, Cyprus, Turkey and Israel with Stage 6 Films only; produced by Prescience and Shooting Script Films
November 10, 2016	Arrival	Sony Pictures Releasing International	international co-distribution outside the U.K., Ireland, Australia, New Zealand, Greece, Cyprus, the Middle East, Turkey, Israel, India and China with Stage 6 Films only; produced by FilmNation Entertainment, 21 Laps Entertainment and Lava Bear Films
November 18, 2016	Bleed for This	Sony Pictures Releasing International	co-distribution in all media excluding airlines in Canada, Latin America, Australia, New Zealand, South Africa, Germany, Austria, France, Spain, the Benelux, Scandinavia, Eastern Europe, Greece and Cyprus with Stage 6 Films only; produced by Bruce Cohen Productions, Magna Entertainment, Sikelia Productions, The Solution Entertainment Group, Verdi Productions and Younger Than You
December 23, 2016	Manchester by the Sea	Sony Pictures Releasing International	co-distribution in Latin America, the Nordics, Asian pay television, the Baltics, the Czech Republic, Slovakia, former Yugoslavia, Hungary, Poland and Romania with Stage 6 Films only; produced by K Period Media, the A/Middleton Project and Pearl Street Films
December 29, 2016	Denial	Sony Pictures Releasing International	Latin American, Scandinavian, Eastern European and Israeli distribution only; produced by Krasnoff/Foster Entertainment, Shoebox Films, Participant Media and BBC Films
January 3, 2017	Sleepless	Sony Pictures Releasing International	co-distribution in Canada, Latin America, Spain, Eastern Europe, the Nordics, Greece, Cyprus, the Middle East, Turkey and India with Stage 6 Films only; produced by Riverstone Pictures and Vertigo Entertainment
January 4, 2017	Don't Tell Her	Sony Pictures Releasing International	French and Belgian distribution only; produced by Entre Chien et Loup
January 13, 2017	The Edge of Seventeen	Sony Pictures Releasing International	international co-distribution outside the U.K., Ireland, Australia, New Zealand, South Africa, the Middle East and China with Stage 6 Films only; produced by STX Entertainment, H. Brothers, Tang Media Productions, Gracie Films and Virgin Produced
March 30, 2017	20th Century Women	Sony Pictures Releasing International	co-distribution in Latin America, Eastern Europe, Spain, Italy, the Baltics, the CIS and Asia excluding Japan and Korea with Stage 6 Films only; produced by Annapurna Pictures, Archer Gray and Modern People
March 31, 2017	Free Fire	Sony Pictures Releasing International	co-distribution in Latin America, Scandinavia, Eastern Europe, Spain, Greece, Cyprus, Australia, New Zealand, South Africa, Israel, Turkey, India and Southeast Asia with Stage 6 Films only; produced by the BFI, Film4 and Rook Films
May 15, 2017	The Sea of Trees	Sony Pictures Releasing International	Latin American, Scandinavian and Eastern European distribution only; produced by Bloom, Gil Netter Productions and Waypoint Entertainment
May 22, 2017	A Kind of Murder	Sony Pictures Releasing International	distribution in Canada, Latin America, the U.K., Ireland, Australia, New Zealand, South Africa, the Nordics, Spain, Portugal, the Benelux, Poland, Romania, Bulgaria, Hungary, the Czech Republic, Slovakia, former Yugoslavia, Greece and Cyprus only; produced by Sierra Pictures, Electric Shadow, 120 dB Films and Killer Films
September 8, 2017	Sleight	Sony Pictures Releasing International	international co-distribution with Stage 6 Films only; produced by Diablo Entertainment
October 20, 2017	Marshall	Sony Pictures Releasing International	international co-distribution with Stage 6 Films only; produced by Starlight Media, Chestnut Ridge Productions and Hudlin Entertainment
November 3, 2017	The Lovers	Sony Pictures Releasing International	international co-distribution with Stage 6 Films only; produced by A24
February 14, 2018	Ice	Sony Pictures Releasing International	Russian distribution under Columbia Pictures only; produced by Art Pictures Studio, Vodorod, Russia-1, National Media Group Studio, Cinema Foundation and STS
April 27, 2018	Disobedience	Sony Pictures Releasing International	co-distribution in Latin America, Scandinavia, Eastern Europe, Germany, Austria, Spain, the Baltics, the CIS, the Benelux, Greece, Cyprus, Portugal, Spain, Turkey, South Africa and Asia with Stage 6 Films only; produced by FilmNation Entertainment, Film4, Element Pictures, LC6 Productions and Braven Films; co-distributed in Japan by Happinet Phantom Studios
May 3, 2018	Just Getting Started	Sony Pictures Releasing International	distribution in Latin America, the Nordics, Greece, Cyprus, Poland, Hungary, the Czech Republic, Slovakia, Romania, former Yugoslavia and Turkey only; produced by Entertainment One Features and Gerber Pictures
May 25, 2018	A Rough Draft	Sony Pictures Releasing International	Russian distribution under Columbia Pictures only; produced by New People Film Company
May 25, 2018	Show Dogs	Sony Pictures Releasing International	distribution in Latin America, Scandinavia, Eastern Europe, Spain, Greece, Cyprus, the Middle East and India only; produced by Global Road Entertainment, Riverstone Pictures, Kintop Pictures, Wales Screen, LipSync and Alive Entertainment
June 29, 2018	Leave No Trace	Sony Pictures Releasing International	international co-distribution outside France with Stage 6 Films only; produced by Bron Creative, Topic Studios, Harrison Productions, Reisman Productions and Still Rolling Productions; co-distributed theatrically in Italy by Adler Entertainment
September 28, 2018	Life Itself	Sony Pictures Releasing International	co-distribution in Eastern Europe, the Baltics, the CIS, Greece, Cyprus, Portugal, the Middle East, India, Indonesia, Malaysia, Thailand, the Philippines and Vietnam with Stage 6 Films only; produced by FilmNation Entertainment, Temple Hill Entertainment and Nostromo Pictures
October 11, 2018	The Perfect Ones	Sony Pictures Releasing International	Russian distribution under Columbia Pictures only; produced by Sinetrain and Mars Media Entertainment
December 7, 2018	Wildlife	Sony Pictures Releasing International	co-distribution in Latin America, Eastern Europe, Scandinavia, Germany, Austria, Switzerland, Spain, Italy, Greece, Cyprus, Portugal, South Africa and Asia excluding Japan and Korea with Stage 6 Films only; produced by June Pictures, Sight Unseen Pictures and Nine Stories Productions
January 1, 2019	A.X.L.	Sony Pictures Releasing International	co-distribution in Canada, Latin America, Eastern Europe, Greece, Cyprus, Scandinavia, Spain, the Middle East, Turkey and India with Stage 6 Films only; produced by Global Road Entertainment, Lakeshore Entertainment and Phantom Four Films
January 3, 2019	Eighth Grade	Sony Pictures Releasing International	international co-distribution outside Japan with Stage 6 Films only; produced by A24 and IAC Films; co-distributed in the Benelux by Cinemien
January 10, 2019	Cold Feet	Sony Pictures Releasing International	German and Austrian distribution under Columbia Pictures only; produced by Deutsche Columbia Pictures Filmproduktion, Claussen + Putz Filmproduktion and Lotus-Film
January 25, 2019	If Beale Street Could Talk	Sony Pictures Releasing International	co-distribution in Latin America, Eastern Europe, the Baltics, the CIS, Scandinavia, Greece, Cyprus, Portugal, South Africa, the Middle East, Israel, Turkey and Asia excluding China and Japan with Stage 6 Films only; produced by Annapurna Pictures, Plan B Entertainment and PASTEL
February 6, 2019	City Hunter	Sony Pictures Releasing International	French distribution only; produced by Les Films du 24 and Axel Films
March 8, 2019	Gloria Bell	Sony Pictures Releasing International	co-distribution in Latin America, Portugal, Spain, Scandinavia, Eastern Europe, the Baltics, the CIS, Greece, Cyprus, South Africa, the Middle East, Turkey and Asia excluding Japan with Stage 6 Films only; produced by FilmNation Entertainment and Fabula
March 21, 2019	The Goldfish	Sony Pictures Releasing International	German and Austrian distribution under Columbia Pictures only; produced by Deutsche Columbia Pictures Filmproduktion, Wiedemann & Berg Filmproduktion and SevenPictures Film
May 10, 2019	Leaving Afghanistan	Walt Disney Studios Pictures Releasing	Russian distribution only; produced by Pavel Lungin Studio
July 25, 2019	The Best of Enemies	Sony Pictures Releasing International	international co-distribution with Stage 6 Films only; produced by Astute Films and Material Pictures
August 1, 2019	Father There Is Only One	Sony Pictures Releasing de España	Spanish distribution only; produced by Bowfinger International Pictures, Mamá se fue de viaje la película A.I.E., Cindy Teperman, Mogambo and Atresmedia Cine
August 2, 2019	Late Night	Sony Pictures Releasing International	international co-distribution outside the U.K., Ireland, Australia, New Zealand, France, Germany, Austria, Switzerland, Israel and airlines with Stage 6 Films only; produced by FilmNation Entertainment, 30West, Imperative Entertainment, 3 Arts Entertainment and Kaling International
August 2, 2019	The Tomorrow Man	Sony Pictures Releasing International	international co-distribution with Stage 6 Films only; produced by Symbolic Exchange and Anonymous Content
September 12, 2019	The Space Between the Lines	Sony Pictures Releasing International	German and Austrian distribution under Columbia Pictures only; produced by Deutsche Columbia Pictures Filmproduktion, Komplizen Film and Erfttal Film
September 19, 2019	Ode to Joy	Sony Pictures Releasing International	international distribution only; produced by Mosaic and Small Dog Picture Company
October 8, 2019	American Woman	Sony Pictures Releasing International	international co-distribution outside the U.K., Ireland and Italy with Stage 6 Films only; produced by Romulus Productions and Scott Free Productions
November 14, 2019	Sin	Walt Disney Studios Pictures Releasing	Russian distribution only; produced by Andrei Konchalovsky Studios, Jean Vigo Italia, Rai Cinema and Perviy Kanal
November 21, 2019	Them That Follow	Sony Pictures Releasing International	international co-distribution with Stage 6 Films only; produced by G-BASE and Amasia Entertainment
December 6, 2019	Honey Boy	Sony Pictures Releasing International	co-distribution outside the U.S. and Japan with Stage 6 Films only; produced by Automatik and Delirio Films
December 11, 2019	Brian Banks	Sony Pictures Releasing International	international co-distribution with Stage 6 Films only; produced by ShivHans Pictures and Gidden Media

== 2020s ==
Release date	Title	Distributor	Notes
January 23, 2020	The Magic Kids: Three Unlikely Heroes	Sony Pictures Releasing International	German and Austrian distribution under Columbia Pictures only; produced by Deutsche Columbia Pictures Filmproduktion, Rat Pack Filmproduktion and Westside Filmproduktion
February 20, 2020	The Lodge	Sony Pictures Releasing International	international co-distribution outside France, Germany, Austria, Switzerland, the Benelux, Italy, Australia, New Zealand and Israel with Stage 6 Films only; produced by FilmNation Entertainment and Hammer Film Productions
March 2, 2020	Narcissus and Goldmund	Sony Pictures Releasing International	German and Austrian distribution under Columbia Pictures only; produced by Deutsche Columbia Pictures Filmproduktion, Mythos Film Produktions, Tempest Film and Lotus Film
March 11, 2020	A Mermaid in Paris	Sony Pictures Releasing International	French distribution under Columbia Pictures only; produced by Overdrive Productions, Entre Chien et Loup, Sisters and Brother Mitevski Production, EuropaCorp and Proximus
August 7, 2020	I WeirDo	Sony Pictures Releasing International	Taiwanese distribution only; produced by Activator
August 20, 2020	Bull	Sony Pictures Releasing International	international co-distribution with Stage 6 Films only; produced by Bert Marcus Film and Invisible Pictures
August 26, 2020	Eternal Beauty	Sony Pictures Releasing International	international co-distribution outside the U.K., Ireland, France, Germany, Austria, Switzerland, the Middle East, China, Korea and Japan with Stage 6 Films only; produced by the BFI, Wellcome, FFilm Cymru Wales and Cliff Edge Pictures
October 8, 2020	The Whaler Boy	Sony Pictures Releasing International	Russian distribution under Columbia Pictures only
October 9, 2020	Saint Maud	Sony Pictures Releasing International	international co-distribution outside the U.K., Ireland and France with Stage 6 Films only; produced by the BFI, Film4 and Escape Plan
October 22, 2020	Deeper!	Sony Pictures Releasing International	Russian distribution under Columbia Pictures only; produced by Bubblegum Production, Kinoprime Foundation, Kinofon LLC and Okko Studios
November 6, 2020	Words on Bathroom Walls	Sony Pictures Releasing International	international co-distribution outside Latin America, Italy, the Benelux and the CIS with Stage 6 Films only; produced by LD Entertainment and Kick the Habit Productions
November 26, 2020	The Glorias	Sony Pictures Releasing International	co-distribution in Latin America, Eastern Europe, the CIS, the Baltics, Scandinavia, Portugal, Greece, Cyprus, the Middle East, Turkey, Australia, New Zealand and Asia excluding China and Japan with Stage 6 Films only; produced by Page Fifty-Four Pictures and Artemis Rising Foundation
December 4, 2020	Sound of Metal	Sony Pictures Releasing International	uncredited onscreen; international co-distribution in all media excluding streaming outside France, Germany and Austria with Stage 6 Films only; produced by Caviar, Ward Four and Flat 7 Productions; co-distributed in the U.K. and Ireland by Vertigo Releasing
December 10, 2020	Ammonite	Sony Pictures Releasing International	international co-distribution outside the U.K., Ireland, France, Germany, Austria, Switzerland, Australia, New Zealand, Japan and airlines with Stage 6 Films only; produced by the BFI, BBC Films, Cross City Films and See-Saw Films
December 31, 2020	Horse Julius and Big Horse Racing	Sony Pictures Releasing International	Russian distribution under Columbia Pictures only; produced by Melnitsa Animation Studio and CTB Film Company
January 14, 2021	Don't Heal Me	Sony Pictures Releasing International	Russian distribution under Columbia Pictures only; produced by Russky Sever
February 11, 2021	The Relatives	Sony Pictures Releasing International	Russian distribution under Columbia Pictures only; produced by RHype film, TNT and Ministry of Culture of Russia
February 12, 2021	The World to Come	Sony Pictures Releasing International	international co-distribution with Stage 6 Films only; produced by Killer Films, Sea Change Media, M.Y.R.A. Entertainment, Yellow Bear Films, Hype Film and Ingenious Media
March 4, 2021	Russian South	Sony Pictures Releasing International	Russian distribution under Columbia Pictures only; produced by Vodorod Film Company, Art Pictures Studio, STS Media, National Media Group Studio and Cinema Foundation
March 19, 2021	City of Lies	Sony Pictures Releasing International	distribution in Canada, Latin America, Spain, Eastern Europe, the Nordics, Greece, Cyprus, the Middle East, Turkey and India only; produced by Global Road Entertainment, Miramax, FilmNation Entertainment, Infinitum Nihil, Good Films, Lipsync and Romulus Entertainment
April 28, 2021	Waiting for Rain	Sony Pictures Releasing International	Korean theatrical distribution under Columbia Pictures only; produced by Kidari Ent and AZIT Pictures
June 10, 2021	Dream Horse	Sony Pictures Releasing International	international co-distribution in all media excluding airlines outside the U.K., Ireland, France, Germany, Austria, Switzerland, Italy and Japan with Stage 6 Films only; produced by Cornerstone Films, Film4, Raw, Ingenious Media and FFilm Cymru Wales
August 6, 2021	Zola	Sony Pictures Releasing International	international co-distribution outside China and Japan with Stage 6 Films only; produced by A24, Killer Films, Gigi Films and Ramona Films
November 24, 2021	Authentik	Sony Pictures Releasing International	French and Belgian distribution only; produced by Nord-Ouest Films, France 2 Cinéma and Auvergne-Rhône-Alpes Cinéma
February 16, 2022	Chickenhare and the Hamster of Darkness	Sony Pictures Releasing International	distribution in France and Italy under Sony Pictures International Productions only; produced by nWave Pictures and Octopolis
February 17, 2022	Pinocchio: A True Story	Sony Pictures Releasing International	Russian distribution only; produced by Licensing Brands LLC and Cinema Fund Russia
April 14, 2022	Locked-in Society	Sony Pictures Releasing International	German and Austrian distribution under Sony Pictures International Productions only; produced by Deutsche Columbia Pictures Filmproduktion, Bantry Bay Productions and ARD Degeto
May 27, 2022	Infinite Storm	Sony Pictures Releasing International	uncredited onscreen; international co-distribution with Stage 6 Films only; produced by Maven Screen Media and the Polish Film Institute; co-distributed in Poland by Gutek Film
July 14, 2022	Father There Is Only One 3	Sony Pictures Releasing International	Spanish distribution under Sony Pictures International Productions only
August 5, 2022	Bodies Bodies Bodies	Sony Pictures Releasing International	uncredited onscreen; co-distribution outside the U.S. and China with Stage 6 Films only; produced by A24 and 2AM
October 19, 2022	The New Toy	Sony Pictures Releasing International	French and Belgian distribution under Sony Pictures International Productions only; produced by Eskwad
October 28, 2022	Four's a Crowd	Sony Pictures Releasing International	Spanish distribution under Sony Pictures International Productions only
November 29, 2022	Sharp Stick	Sony Pictures Releasing International	international co-distribution with Stage 6 Films only; produced by FilmNation Entertainment and Good Thing Going
January 26, 2023	Die drei ??? – Erbe des Drachen	Sony Pictures Releasing International	German and Austrian distribution under Sony Pictures International Productions only; produced by Deutsche Columbia Pictures Filmproduktion, Wiedemann & Berg Filmproduktion and SevenPictures Film
April 26, 2023	Wicked Little Letters	Sony Pictures Releasing International	uncredited onscreen; distribution in Latin America, Eastern Europe, the Baltics, the CIS, Scandinavia, Greece, Cyprus, the Middle East, Turkey, Israel and Asia only; produced by StudioCanal, Film4 and South of the River Pictures; distributed under Sony Pictures Classics in China and Stage 6 Films in all other territories
May 3, 2023	La Marginale	Sony Pictures Releasing International	French distribution under Sony Pictures International Productions only; produced by Moana Films
May 19, 2023	Beau Is Afraid	Sony Pictures Releasing International	co-distribution in the U.K., Ireland, the Middle East, pan Asian pay television and worldwide airlines and ships with Stage 6 Films only; produced by A24 and Square Peg
October 23, 2023	One for the Road (2023)	Sony Pictures Releasing International	German and Austrian distribution under Sony Pictures International Productions only; produced by Deutsche Columbia Pictures Filmproduktion, Sunny SideUp Film Produktion, Wiedemann & Berg Filmproduktion, Pictures in a Frame and SevenPictures Film
July 17, 2024	Father There Is Only One 4	Sony Pictures Releasing International	Spanish distribution under Sony Pictures International Productions only
August 7, 2024	Dead Talents Society	Sony Pictures Releasing International	Taiwanese distribution under Sony Pictures International Productions only; produced by Activator
August 23, 2024	I Hate Summer	Sony Pictures Releasing International	Spanish distribution under Sony Pictures International Productions only;
September 27, 2024	My Hero Academia: You're Next	Sony Pictures Releasing International	select international theatrical distribution under Crunchyroll only; produced by Bones
November 7, 2024	I'm Still Here	Sony Pictures Releasing International	distribution in Latin America, Eastern Europe, the Baltics, the Middle East, Turkey, Portugal, Australia and New Zealand only; produced by VideoFilmes, RT Features, Mact Productions, Arte France Cinéma, Conspiração and Globoplay; distributed under Sony Pictures International Productions in Brazil and under Sony Pictures Classics in all other territories
November 20, 2024	37: l'ombre et la proie	Sony Pictures Releasing International	French distribution under Sony Pictures International Productions only; produced by Moana Films
November 24, 2024	Christmas Balls	Sony Pictures Releasing International	distribution in France, Belgium and Switzerland under Sony Pictures International Productions only
December 20, 2024	Un lío de millones	Sony Pictures Releasing International	Spanish distribution under Sony Pictures International Productions only; produced by Tornasol Media and Mis hijos valen oro AIE
December 25, 2024	Green Bones	Sony Pictures Releasing International	Filipino distribution only; produced by GMA Pictures, GMA Public Affairs and Brightburn Entertainment
January 23, 2025	Die drei ??? und der Karpatenhund	Sony Pictures Releasing International	German and Austrian distribution under Sony Pictures International Productions only; produced by Deutsche Columbia Pictures Filmproduktion and Wiedemann & Berg Filmproduktion
March 28, 2025	Barren Land	Sony Pictures Releasing International	Spanish distribution under Sony Pictures International Productions only
April 11, 2025	Un funeral de locos	Sony Pictures Releasing International	Spanish distribution under Sony Pictures International Productions only
May 29, 2025	Bring Her Back	Sony Pictures Releasing International	uncredited onscreen; international co-distribution outside Russia, China and Japan with Stage 6 Films only; produced by A24, Causeway Films and RackaRacka
June 12, 2025	Materialists	Sony Pictures Releasing International	uncredited onscreen; international co-distribution outside Russia, China and Japan with Stage 6 Films only; produced by A24, 2AM and Killer Films
June 26, 2025	Father There Is Only One 5	Sony Pictures Releasing International	Spanish distribution under Sony Pictures International Productions only
August 22, 2025	A Family Knight-Mare	Sony Pictures Releasing International	Spanish distribution under Sony Pictures International Productions only
September 11, 2025	You Gotta Believe	Sony Pictures Releasing International	international distribution only; produced by Media Finance Capital and Santa Rita Film Co.
September 12, 2025	Spinal Tap II: The End Continues	Sony Pictures Releasing International	uncredited onscreen; co-distribution outside the U.S. with Stage 6 Films only; produced by Castle Rock Entertainment
October 17, 2025	After the Hunt	Sony Pictures Releasing International	theatrical distribution in the U.K., Ireland, Latin America, Australia, New Zealand, Spain, Italy, Germany, Austria, Scandinavia, Eastern Europe, the Benelux, Portugal, Greece, Cyprus and Israel only; produced by Amazon MGM Studios, Imagine Entertainment, Frenesy Film Company and Big Indie Pictures
October 23, 2025	Twinless	Sony Pictures Releasing International	uncredited onscreen; international co-distribution with Stage 6 Films only; produced by Republic Pictures, Permut Presentations and TPC
October 29, 2025	Yoroï	Sony Pictures Releasing International	distribution in France, Belgium and French-speaking Switzerland under Sony Pictures International Productions only
November 7, 2025	Jujutsu Kaisen: Execution	Sony Pictures Releasing International	select international theatrical distribution under Crunchyroll only; produced by MAPPA
November 26, 2025	KMJS Gabi ng Lagim: The Movie	Sony Pictures Releasing International	Filipino distribution only; produced by GMA Pictures and GMA Public Affairs
December 5, 2025	Me has robado el corazón	Sony Pictures Releasing International	Spanish distribution under Sony Pictures International Productions only
January 22, 2026	Die drei ??? - Toteninsel	Sony Pictures Releasing International	German and Austrian distribution under Sony Pictures International Productions only; produced by Deutsche Columbia Pictures Filmproduktion and Wiedemann & Berg Filmproduktion
January 23, 2026	Mercy	Sony Pictures Releasing International	international theatrical distribution only; produced by Amazon MGM Studios, Atlas Entertainment and Bazelevs Company
January 30, 2026	Aida, the Movie	Sony Pictures Releasing International	Spanish distribution under Sony Pictures International Productions only; produced by The Mediapro Studio and Telecinco Cinema
February 13, 2026	Crime 101	Sony Pictures Releasing International	international theatrical distribution outside France only; produced by Amazon MGM Studios, Raw, Working Title Films, The Story Factory and Wild State
February 18, 2026	Kiss of the Spider Woman	Sony Pictures Releasing International	distribution in all media excluding airlines in the U.K., Ireland, France, Germany, Austria and Spain only; produced by Artists Equity, Josephson Entertainment, Nuyorican Productions, Tom Kirdahy Productions and Mohari Media
March 13, 2026	Torrente for President	Sony Pictures Releasing International	Spanish distribution under Sony Pictures International Productions only
March 20, 2026	Project Hail Mary	Sony Pictures Releasing International	international theatrical distribution only; produced by Amazon MGM Studios, Pascal Pictures, Lord Miller Productions, Waypoint Entertainment and Open Invite Films
April 10, 2026	Boulevard	Sony Pictures Releasing International	Spanish distribution under Sony Pictures International Productions only
May 8, 2026	The Sheep Detectives	Sony Pictures Releasing International	international theatrical distribution only; produced by Amazon MGM Studios, Working Title Films, Lord Miller Productions and Three Strange Angels
June 5, 2026	Masters of the Universe	Sony Pictures Releasing International	international theatrical distribution outside France only; produced by Amazon MGM Studios, Mattel Studios and Escape Artists
August 5, 2026	Nobody's Son	Sony Pictures Releasing International	French and Belgian distribution under Sony Pictures International Productions only
August 5, 2026	Kyma, l'onde mystérieuse	Sony Pictures Releasing International	French and Swiss distribution under Sony Pictures International Productions only; produced by Moana Films
September 17, 2026	Henry's First Dates	Sony Pictures Releasing International	international distribution outside Thailand only; produced by GDH 559
October 3, 2026	Verity	Sony Pictures Releasing International	international theatrical distribution outside Australia, New Zealand, Spain and Mexico only; produced by Amazon MGM Studios, Eat the Cat, Semi-Formal Productions, Somewhere Pictures, Heartbones Entertainment and Shiny Penny
October 23, 2026	Ali G: Who Iz I?	Sony Pictures Releasing International	select international theatrical distribution only; produced by Four by Two Films
November 13, 2026	How to Rob a Bank	Sony Pictures Releasing International	international theatrical distribution outside Japan only; produced by Amazon MGM Studios, Imagine Entertainment and 87North Productions
January 15, 2027	The Beekeeper 2	Sony Pictures Releasing International	international theatrical distribution outside the U.K., Ireland, Australia, New Zealand, Spain, Italy, Mexico, Greece, Cyprus, German-speaking Europe, the Middle East and Asia excluding India only; produced by Miramax, Punch Palace Productions and Long Shot Productions
March 5, 2027	The Thomas Crown Affair	Sony Pictures Releasing International	international theatrical distribution outside the U.K., Ireland, Australia, New Zealand, France, Spain and Mexico only; produced by Amazon MGM Studios, Atlas Entertainment, Outlier Society and Toberoff Productions
November 5, 2027	Charlie vs. The Chocolate Factory	Sony Pictures Releasing International	international theatrical distribution outside China and Russia only; produced by Netflix Animation Studios and the Roald Dahl Story Company

== See also ==
- List of Columbia Pictures films
- List of TriStar Pictures films
- List of Screen Gems films
