= List of Spanish films of 2025 =

A list of Spanish-produced and co-produced feature films released or scheduled for release in Spain in 2025. When applicable, the domestic theatrical release date is favoured.

== Film openings ==
Release		Title (Domestic title)	Cast and crew	Distribution label	Ref.
J A N U A R Y	7	Justicia para Diego	Eduardo Mendoza (director/screenplay); Jorge Valcárcel (director)	RTVE Play	
J A N U A R Y	10	Becoming Ana (La mitad de Ana)	Marta Nieto (director/screenplay); Beatriz Herzog (screenplay); Marta Nieto, Noa Álvarez, Nahuel Pérez Biscayart	Elastica	(Note: Spain-France co-production)
J A N U A R Y	10	Dismantling an Elephant (Desmontando un elefante)	Aitor Echevarría (director/screenplay); Pep Garrido (screenplay); Emma Suárez, Natalia de Molina, Darío Grandinetti	Filmax	
J A N U A R Y	10	Ciento volando	Arantxa Aguirre (director/screenplay); Eduardo Chillida, Jone Laspiur	A Contracorriente Films	
J A N U A R Y	10	The Human Hibernation	Anna Cornudella (director/screenplay); Lluís Sellarès (screenplay); Clara Muck Dietrich, Brian Stevens, Neil O'Neil, Janet Hubbell	Begin Again Films	
J A N U A R Y	10	Sin él	Emilio Martínez-Borso (director/screenplay); Aleida Torrent, David Marce, Aida Flix, David Ramírez	Moon Entertainment	
J A N U A R Y	17	Norbert	José Corral Llorente (director/screenplay)	Buena Vista International	(Note: Spain-Argentina co-production)
J A N U A R Y	17	Goodbye Madrid (Adiós Madrid)	Diego Corsini (director/screenplay); Mariana Cangas (screenplay); Luciano Cáceres, Javier Godino, Fariba Sheikhan, Mónica Solaun, Ramón Esquinas, Ingrid Rubio	39 Escalones Films	(Note: Argentina-Spain co-production)
J A N U A R Y	17	From My Cold Dead Hands	Javier Horcajada Fontecha (director/screenplay)	Sideral Cinema	
J A N U A R Y	24	Rich Flu (La fiebre de los ricos)	Galder Gaztelu-Urrutia (director/screenplay); Pedro Rivero, Sam Steiner, David Desola (screenplay); Mary Elizabeth Winstead, Lorraine Bracco, Jonah Hauer-King, Timothy Spall	Filmax	
J A N U A R Y	24	Bad Influence (Mala influencia)	Chloé Wallace (director/screenplay); Diana Muro (screenplay); Alberto Olmo, Eléa Rochera, Selam Ortega, Clara Chaín, Mirela Balić, Enrique Arce	Tripictures	
J A N U A R Y	24	Myocardium (Miocardio)	José Manuel Carrasco (director/screenplay); Marina Salas, Vito Sanz, Pilar Bergés, Luis Callejo	Syldavia Cinema	
J A N U A R Y	24	Itoiz Summer Sessions (Itoiz udako sesioak)	Larraitz Zuazo, Zuri Goikoetxea, Ainhoa Andraka (directors/screenplay); Juan Carlos Pérez	Atera Films	
J A N U A R Y	31	Mikaela	Daniel Calparsoro (director); Arturo Ruiz Serrano (screenplay); Antonio Resines, Natalia Azahara, Adriana Torrebejano, Cristina Kovani, Roger Casamajor	Buena Vista International	
J A N U A R Y	31	The Party's Over (Fin de fiesta)	Elena Manrique (director/screenplay); Edith Martínez-Val, Beatriz Arjona, Sonia Barba	A Contracorriente Films	
J A N U A R Y	31	The Low Land (Tierra baja)	Miguel Santesmases (director/screenplay); Ángeles González-Sinde (screenplay); Aitana Sánchez-Gijón, Pere Arquillué	Benecé	
J A N U A R Y	31	Siete días en mayo	Rosana Pastor (director/screenplay); Pedro García Ríos, Miguel Ángel Sánchez (screenplay); David Riondino, José M. Mohedano, Manuela Carmena, Paca Sauquillo, Alejandro Ruiz-Huerta	Syldavia Cinema	
F E B R U A R Y	7	Still Life with Ghosts (Bodegón con fantasmas)	Enrique Buleo (director/screenplay); Jordi Aguilar, Eduardo Antuña, José Carabias, Pilar Matas, Nuria Mencía, Bianca Kovacs	Sideral Cinema	
F E B R U A R Y	7	Break a Leg (Mucha mierda)	Alba Sotorra (director/screenplay); David Arnanz (screenplay); Ana Belén, Marisa Paredes, Juan Diego, Tina Sainz, Enriqueta Carballeira, Rocío Dúrcal, José Sacristán, Juan Margallo, Gloria Berrocal, José Carlos Plaza, Alberto Alonso, Petra Martínez	39 Escalones Films	
F E B R U A R Y	14	The Drunkmen's Marseillaise (La marsellesa de los borrachos)	Pablo Gil Rituerto (director/screenplay); Alba Lombardia (screenplay)	Begin Again Films	(Note: Spain-France-Italy co-production)
F E B R U A R Y	14	Giants of La Mancha (Los exploradores)	Gonzalo Gutiérrez (director); Carlos Kotkin, Pablo Ricardo Biondi (screenplay)	Cinemaran Spain	(Note: Argentina-Spain-Germany co-production)
F E B R U A R Y	14	Descalzos	Santos Blanco (director/screenplay); Javier Lorenzo (screenplay)	Bosco Films A Contracorriente Films	
F E B R U A R Y	21	Daniela Forever	Nacho Vigalondo (director/screenplay); Henry Golding, Beatrice Grannò, Aura Garrido	Filmax	
F E B R U A R Y	21	Padres	José Ángel Bohollo (director/screenplay); Natalia Verbeke, Fernando Cayo, Carlos Fuentes, Angelina Stoian	A Contracorriente Films	
F E B R U A R Y	21	Limonov: The Ballad (Limonov)	Kirill Serebrennikov (director/screenplay); Ben Hopkins, Paweł Pawlikowski (screenplay); Ben Whishaw, Viktoria Miroshnichenko, Tomas Arana, Corrado Invernizzi	Filmin	(Note: France-Italy-Spain co-production)
F E B R U A R Y	21	Memories of a Burning Body (Memorias de un cuerpo que arde)	Antonella Sudasassi Furniss (director/screenplay); Sol Carballo, Paulina Bernini, Juliana Filloy	Mosaico Filmes	(Note: Costa Rica-Spain co-production)
F E B R U A R Y	27	Valientes	Andrés Garrigó (director/screenplay); Josepmaria Anglès, Josemaría Muñoz (screenplay); Eduardo Verástegui, Amy Sinclair, Michael Warsaw, José Antonio Kast, Jaime Mayor Oreja, Alfonso Bullón de Mendoza, Bernardito Auza	European Dreams Factory	
F E B R U A R Y	28	The Story of Us (Nosotros)	Helena Taberna (director/screenplay); Virginia Yagüe (screenplay); María Vázquez, Pablo Molinero	Vértigo Films	
F E B R U A R Y	28	The Goldsmith's Secret (El secreto del orfebre)	Olga Osorio (director/screenplay); Mario Casas, Michelle Jenner, Zoe Bonafonte, Enzo Oliver	Warner Bros. Pictures	
F E B R U A R Y	28	Hard Truths (Mi única familia)	Mike Leigh (director/screenplay); Marianne Jean-Baptiste, Michele Austin	BTeam Pictures	
F E B R U A R Y	28	Equipo Crónica. Arte de trinchera	Rafael Sesa, Felipe Villaplana (directors); Carlos López Olano (screenplay); Manolo Valdés	Versión Digital	
M A R C H	7	Afternoons of Solitude (Tardes de soledad)	Albert Serra (director/screenplay); Andrés Roca Rey	A Contracorriente Films	
M A R C H	7	A Bathroom of One's Own (Un bany propi)	Lucía Casañ Rodríguez (director/screenplay); Nuria González, Carles Sanjaime, Amparo Ferrer-Báguena, Manuel Valls	Begin Again Films	
M A R C H	7	Esto no es Hollywood (La historia inacabada de los hermanos Ibarretxe)	Jone Ibarretxe, Nere Falagan (directors/screenplay); María Maestre, Garazi Velasco, Javier Echániz (screenplay); Javi Ibarretxe, Josemi Ibarretxe, Esteban Ibarretxe	Selected Films	
M A R C H	7	La revolución de las musas	Mar Nantas (director/screenplay); Yaiza de Lamo, Juno Álvarez (directors); Violeta Rodríguez, Josep Julien, Arnau Comas, Gonzalo Ramos, Yolanda Sey, Albert Pla, Laura Corbacho, Laura Roig	Moira Pictures	
M A R C H	7	Atín Aya: Retrato del silencio	Hugo Cabezas, Alejandro Toro (directors/screenplay); Atín Aya	—N/a	
M A R C H	14	Wolfgang (Wolfgang (Extraordinari))	Javier Ruiz Caldera (director); Laia Aguilar, Carmen Marfà, Yago Alonso, Valentina Viso (screenplay); Miki Esparbé, Jordi Catalán, Àngels Gonyalons, Berto Romero, Anna Castillo	Universal Pictures	
M A R C H	14	Morlaix	Jaime Rosales (director/screenplay); Fanny Burdino, Samuel Doux, Delphine Gleize (screenplay); Aminthe Audiard, Samuel Kircher, Mélanie Thierry, Alex Brendemühl	A Contracorriente Films	
M A R C H	14	Todos lo sabían	Iratxe Pérez Barandalla (director/screenplay); José Luis Pérez, César Apesteguía, Juan Arbizu, Patxi Azpilikueta, Koldo Eslava, Mariví Martinicorena	—N/a	
M A R C H	21	Breaking Walls (Los aitas)	Borja Cobeaga (director/screenplay); Valentina Viso (screenplay); Quim Gutiérrez, Juan Diego Botto, Iñaki Ardanaz, Mikel Losada, Laura Weissmahr, Ramón Barea	BTeam Pictures	
M A R C H	21	8	Julio Medem (director/screenplay); Ana Rujas, Javier Rey, Álvaro Morte, Tamar Novas, Loreto Mauleón, María Isasi, Carla Díaz, Mateo Medina	Vercine	
M A R C H	21	One Year and One Day (Un año y un día)	Alex San Martín (director/screenplay); Luis Fernández, Nicole Wallace, Nadia de Santiago	#ConUnPack	
M A R C H	21	Misericordia	Alain Guiraudie (director/screenplay); Félix Kysyl, Catherine Frot, Jacques Develay, Jean-Baptiste Durand, David Ayala	Karma Films	(Note: France-Spain-Portugal co-production)
M A R C H	21	Salvaxe, salvaxe	Emilio Fonseca (director/screenplay); Xiana do Teixeiro (screenplay)	Walkie Talkie Films	
M A R C H	21	Sugar Island	Johanne Gómez Terrero (director/screenplay); María Abenia (screenplay)	Pleamar Films	
M A R C H	28	Barren Land (Tierra de nadie)	Albert Pintó (director); Fernando Navarro (screenplay); Luis Zahera, Karra Elejalde, Jesús Carroza	Sony Pictures	
M A R C H	28	A Whale (Una ballena)	Pablo Hernando (director/screenplay); Ingrid García-Jonsson, Ramón Barea, Paolo Sassanelli	Elastica	
M A R C H	28	Fury (La furia)	Gemma Blasco (director/screenplay); Eva Pauné (screenplay); Ángela Cervantes, Àlex Monner	Filmax	
M A R C H	28	Un hombre libre	Laura Hojman (director/screenplay); María D. Valderrama (screenplay); Agustín Gómez-Arcos	Surtsey Films	
M A R C H	28	Más cinco	Luis C. Lagos, Pablo Moreno (directors); Benjamín Lorenzo (screenplay); Antonio Reyes, Assumpta Serna, Juan Rueda, Daniel Ramos-Lorenzo, Javier Lorenzo, María Cort	European Dreams Factory	
A P R I L	3	Mercenario	Juanma Arizmendi (director/screenplay); Anna Surinyach, Ignacio Acconcia, Marçal Cebrian (screenplay); Joan Estéves	Movistar Plus+	
A P R I L	4	Deaf (Sorda)	Eva Libertad (director/screenplay); Miriam Garlo, Álvaro Cervantes, Elena Irureta, Joaquín Notario	A Contracorriente Films	
A P R I L	4	The Cavern Crimes (La huella del mal)	Manuel Ríos San Martín (director/screenplay); Victoria Dal Vera (screenplay); Blanca Suárez, Daniel Grao, Aria Bedmar, Víctor Palmero, Cosimo Fusco, Fernando Cayo, Juanma Cifuentes	Alfa Pictures	
A P R I L	4	To Our Friends (A nuestros amigos)	Adrián Orr (director/screenplay); Celso Giménez, Samuel M. Delgado (screenplay); Sara Toledo, Pedro Izquierdo, Paula Mira, Manuel Cantelli, Itziar Manero, Pablo Díaz	Márgenes Distribución	
A P R I L	4	Kantauri	Xabier Mina (director/screenplay); Isaías Cruz (director); Beatriz Iso (screenplay); Marta Gil, Patxi Zubizarreta	Barton Films	
A P R I L	4	Código Marcos	Patricia Pérez Fernández, Liena Cid Navia (directors/screenplay); Liena Cid Navia, Pablo Ventosa, Marcos Ventosa, Julio Cid, Óscar Ventosa	Sideral Cinema	
A P R I L	11	Goat Girl (La niña de la cabra)	Ana Asensio (director/screenplay); Alessandra González, Juncal Fernández, Lorena López, Javier Pereira, Enrique Villén, Gloria Muñoz	Avalon	
A P R I L	11	Un funeral de locos	Manuel Gómez Pereira (director); Yolanda García Serrano (screenplay); Quim Gutiérrez, Ernesto Alterio, Belén Rueda, Hugo Silva, Inma Cuesta, Antonio Resines	Sony Pictures	
A P R I L	11	The Light of Aisha (La luz de Aisha)	Shadi Adib (director); Xavier Romero, Llorenç Español (screenplay)	Filmax	
A P R I L	11	Away (Molt lluny)	Gerard Oms (director/screenplay); Mario Casas, David Verdaguer, Ilyass El Ouahdani	BTeam Pictures	
A P R I L	16	McMansion (El casoplón)	Joaquín Mazón (director); Roberto Jiménez (screenplay); Pablo Chiapella, Raquel Guerrero, Edurne, Iñaki Miramón	Buena Vista International	
A P R I L	16	Our Father, Our President (Parenostre)	Manuel Huerga (director); Toni Soler (screenplay); Josep Maria Pou, Carme Sansa, Alberto San Juan	Filmax	
A P R I L	16	¡Caigan las rosas blancas!	Albertina Carri (director/screenplay); Agustín Godoy, Carolina Alamino (screenplay); Carolina Alamino, Rocío Zuviria, Mijal Katzowicz, Maru Marcet, Laura Paredes, Valeria Correa, Renata Carvalho, Luisa Gavasa	Vitrine Filmes	(Note: Argentina-Spain co-production)
A P R I L	25	Devil Dog Road (Lo carga el diablo)	Guillermo Polo (director/screenplay); David Pascual, Guillermo Herrero, Vicente Peñarrocha (screenplay); Pablo Molinero, Mero González, Isak Férriz, Antonia San Juan	Begin Again Films	
A P R I L	25	Everything I Don't Know (Todo lo que no sé)	Ana Lambarri (director/screenplay); Susana Abaitua, Ane Gabarain, Andrés Lima, Francesco Carril, Natalia Huarte, Stéphanie Magnin	39 Escalones Films	
A P R I L	25	Pheasant Island (Faisaien Irla)	Asier Urbieta (director/screenplay); Andoni de Carlos (screenplay); Jone Laspiur, Sambou Diaby	BTeam Pictures	
A P R I L	30	The Good Manners (La buena letra)	Celia Rico (director/screenplay); Loreto Mauleón, Enric Auquer, Roger Casamajor, Ana Rujas	Caramel Films	
A P R I L	30	Kayara (Kayara. La guerrera del Imperio Inca)	Cesar Zelada (director/screenplay); Brian Cleveland, Jason Cleveland (screenplay)	Flins y Pinículas	(Note: Peru-Spain co-production)
M A Y	8	The Silence of Marcos Tremmer (El silencio de Marcos Tremmer)	Miguel García de la Calera (director); Benjamín Vicuña, Adriana Ugarte, Daniel Hendler, Félix Gómez	Amazon Prime Video	
M A Y	9	The Portuguese House (Una quinta portuguesa)	Avelina Prat (director/screenplay); Manolo Solo, Maria de Medeiros, Branka Katić	Filmax	
M A Y	9	The Heaven of Animals (El cielo de los animales)	Santi Amodeo (director/screenplay); Raúl Arévalo, Manolo Solo, Paula Díaz, Jesús Carroza	Maravillas Films	
M A Y	9	Enemies (Enemigos)	David Valero (director/screenplay); Alfonso Amador (screenplay); Christian Checa, Hugo Welzel, Estefanía de los Santos	Vértice 360	
M A Y	9	This Too Shall Pass (También esto pasará)	Maria Ripoll (director/screenplay); Olga Iglesias (screenplay); Marina Salas, Susi Sánchez, Carlos Cuevas	A Contracorriente Films	
M A Y	9	Surfacing (La llegada del hijo)	Cecilia Atán, Valeria Pivato (director/screenplay); Maricel Álvarez, Cristina Banegas, Angelo Mutti Spinetta	BTeam Pictures	
M A Y	9	Secundarias	Arturo Dueñas (director/screenplay); Béatrice Fulconis, Olga Mansilla, Inés Acebes, Marta Ruiz de Viñaspre, Pino de Pablos (screenplay); Béatrice Fulconis, Olga Mansilla, Pino de Pablos, Inés Acebes, Marta Ruiz de Viñaspre, Pablo Rodríguez, Raúl Escudero	Moon Entertainment	
M A Y	9	Erreplika	Pello Gutiérrez (director/screenplay); David Aguilar Iñigo, Iñaki Sagastume (screenplay)	Atera Films	
M A Y	16	The Instinct (El instinto)	Juan Albarracín (director/screenplay); Javier Pereira, Fernando Cayo, Eva Llorach	Barton Films	
M A Y	16	El cuento del lobo	Norberto López Amado (director/screenplay); Daniel Grao, Lucía Jiménez, Paco Tous, María Romanillos	A Contracorriente Films	
M A Y	16	The Remnants of You (Lo que queda de ti)	Gala Gracia (director/screenplay); Laia Manzanares, Ángela Cervantes	Karma Films	
M A Y	16	The Stepmother's Bond (Tras el verano)	Yolanda Centeno (director/screenplay); Jesús Luque (screenplay); Alexandra Jiménez, Juan Diego Botto, Ruth Gabriel, Álex Infantes	Alfa Pictures	
M A Y	16	Almudena	Azucena Rodríguez (director/screenplay); Almudena Grandes	Syldavia Cinema	
M A Y	16	Centaures de la nit	Marc Recha (director/screenplay); Nadine Lamari (screenplay); Lluís Soler, Montse Germán, Muntsa Alcañiz, Eulàlia Ramon, Raquel Ferri, Ola Planas, Cristina Dilla, Ignasi Terraza	A Contracorriente Films	
M A Y	16	Negro limbo	Lorenzo Benítez (director/screenplay); David Morello, Món Fernández-Danx (screenplay); Acacio Mañé Ela	—N/a	
M A Y	16	Miguel Velázquez. El catedrático del ring	David Cánovas (director/screenplay); Raúl Jiménez Pastor (screenplay); Miguel Velázquez	—N/a	
M A Y	22	Ellas en la ciudad	Reyes Gallegos (director/screenplay); Rafael Cobos (screenplay)	Movistar Plus+	
M A Y	23	The Exiles (Los Tortuga)	Belén Funes (director/screenplay); Marçal Cebrian (screenplay); Antonia Zegers, Elvira Lara, Mamen Camacho	A Contracorriente Films	
M A Y	23	Antes de Nós	Ángeles Huerta (director); Pepe Coira (screenplay); Xoán Fórneas, Cris Iglesias, Nancho Novo	Atalante	
M A Y	23	Fine Young Men (Hombres íntegros)	Alejandro Andrade (director/screenplay); Armando López (screenplay); Andrés Revo, María Aura, Tomás Rojas	Syldavia Cinema	(Note: Mexico-Spain-France co-production)
M A Y	23	Hija del volcán	Jenifer de la Rosa Martín (director/screenplay)	Surtsey Films	
M A Y	23	Grup Natural	Nina Solà (director/screenplay)	#ConUnPack	
M A Y	30	Kill the Jockey (El jockey)	Luis Ortega (director/screenplay); Fabián Casas, Rodolfo Palacios (screenplay); Nahuel Pérez Biscayart, Úrsula Corberó, Daniel Giménez Cacho, Mariana Di Girolamo	Caramel Films	(Note: Argentina-Mexico-Spain-Denmark-United States co-production)
M A Y	30	Hamburg (Hamburgo)	Lino Escalera (director/screenplay); Daniel Remón, Roberto Martín Maiztegui (screenplay); Jaime Lorente, Roger Casamajor, Ioana Bugarin, Asia Ortega, Mona Martínez, Antonio Buil	Filmax	
M A Y	30	A Widow's Game (La viuda negra)	Carlos Sedes (director); Ivana Baquero, Tristán Ulloa, Carmen Machi	Netflix	
M A Y	30	Graduation Trip: Mallorca (Viaje de fin de curso: Mallorca)	Paco Caballero (director); Eric Navarro, Natalia Durán (screenplay); Yolanda Ramos, Berta Castañé, Sara Vidorreta, Claudia Roset, Nadia Vilaplana, Diego Garisa, Aiden Botía, Martí Cordero	Amazon Prime Video	
M A Y	30	Doñana	Carmen Rodríguez (director)	Wanda Visión	
J U N E	6	The Good Luck (La buena suerte)	Gracia Querejeta (director/screenplay); María Ruiz (screenplay); Megan Montaner, Hugo Silva, Miguel Rellán, Eva Ugarte, Ismael Martínez, Chani Martín	Karma Films	
J U N E	6	Sirāt (Sirat. Trance en el desierto)	Oliver Laxe (director/screenplay); Santiago Fillol (screenplay); Sergi López, Bruno Núñez	BTeam Pictures	
J U N E	6	Cuatro paredes	Ibon Cormenzana (director/screenplay); Roger Danès, Alfred Pérez-Fargas, Manuela Vellés (screenplay); Sofía Otero, Manuela Vellés, Roberto Álamo, Elena Irureta, Ramón Barea	A Contracorriente Films	
J U N E	12	All in Favor (Votemos)	Santiago Requejo (director/screenplay); Clara Lago, Tito Valverde, Gonzalo de Castro, Raúl Fernández de Pablo, Neus Sanz, Christian Checa, Charo Reina	DeAPlaneta	
J U N E	12	Queen of Coal (Miss Carbón)	Agustina Macri (director); Erika Halvorsen (screenplay); Lux Pascal, Paco León, Laura Grandinetti, Romina Escobar	Caramel Films	
J U N E	12	Join Me for Breakfast (Esmorza amb mi)	Iván Morales (director/screenplay); Almudena Monzú, Marta Armengol (screenplay); Anna Alarcón, Ivan Massagué, Álvaro Cervantes, Marina Salas, Oriol Pla	Filmax	
J U N E	12	Entre mareas	Oriol Cardús (director/screenplay); Quirze Codina	—N/a	
J U N E	12	1,17	Javier Linares Cadenas de Llano, Javier Linares Sabater (directors); Rubén Casas Oché (screenplay)	—N/a	
J U N E	13	Los bárbaros	Javier Barbero, Martín Guerra (directors/screenplay); Àlex Monner, Greta Fernández, Eliza Rycembel, Job Mansilla	Pantalla Partida	
J U N E	13	Rider	Ignacio Estaregui (director); S. Sureño (screenplay); Mariela Martínez	Begin Again Films	
J U N E	13	Amores brujos	Lucía Álvarez (director); José Ramón Fernández (screenplay); Lucía Álvarez, Jesús Barranco, Clara Muñiz, Luis García Montero	Syldavia Cinema	
J U N E	19	Quinografía	Mariano Donoso, Federico Cardone (directors); Mariana Guzzante (screenplay); Quino	—N/a	
J U N E	20	Virgins (Vírgenes)	Álvaro Díaz Lorenzo (director/screenplay); Carlos Scholz, César Vicente, Xavi Caudevilla, Natalia Azahara, Cristina Kovani	Filmax	
J U N E	20	Bajo un volcán	Martín Cuervo (director/screenplay); Irene Niubó (screenplay); William Levy, Maggie Civantos, Adriana Torrebejano, Fabiola Guajardo, Elia Galera, Pino Montesdeoca, Antón Lofer	Beta Fiction	
J U N E	20	La furgo	Eloy Calvo (director); Mercè Sàrrias, Ramón Pardina (screenplay); Pol López, Martina Lleida	Sideral Cinema	
J U N E	20	Dani Fernández. Todo cambia	Charlie Arnaiz, Alberto Ortega (directors); Myriam Casin (screenplay); Dani Fernández	—N/a	
J U N E	20	Cariñena, vino del mar	Javier Calvo (director/screenplay); Diego Garisa, Alejandro Bordanove, Itziar Miranda, Alba Martínez, Blanca Laínez, Nacho Rubio, Ricardo Joven, Paco Paricio, Javier Aranda	Filmax	
J U N E	20	Fandango	Remedios Malvárez (director/screenplay); Arturo Andújar (director); Miguel Ángel Parra (screenplay)	—N/a	
J U N E	26	Father There Is Only One 5 (Padre no hay más que uno 5: Nido repleto)	Santiago Segura (director/screenplay); Marta González de Vega (screenplay); Santiago Segura, Toni Acosta, Loles León, Calma Segura, Luna Fulgencio	Sony Pictures	
J U N E	27	Ramón and Ramón (Ramón y Ramón)	Salvador del Solar (director/screenplay); Héctor Gálvez (screenplay); Emanuel Soriano, Álvaro Cervantes, Darío Yazbek Bernal	BTeam Pictures	
J U N E	27	Infiltrada en el búnker	Pablo de la Chica (director/screenplay), Goize Blanco	Amazon Prime Video	
J U N E	27	Borau y el cine	Germán Roda (director/screenplay); José Luis Borau	Me Lo Creo	
J U N E	27	Azul de niño	Raúl Guardans (director/screenplay); Raúl Guardans, Eva de Luis, Tony Corvillo, Raúl Guardans, Meritxell Huertas, Kathy Sey	#ConUnPack	
J U N E	27	Las hijas del trueno	José Martínez, Marisol Picón (directors)	Moon Entertainment	
J U L Y	4	Capitolio vs Capitolio	Javier Horcajada (director)	Sideral Cinema	
J U L Y	18	Voy a pasármelo mejor	Ana de Alva (director); David Serrano, Luz Cipriota (screenplay); Izan Fernández, Renata Hermida, Alba Planas, Rodrigo Gibaja, Raúl Arévalo, Karla Souza	Beta Fiction	
J U L Y	25	Les irresponsables	Laura Mañá (director/screenplay); Marta Buchaca (screenplay); Laia Marull, Betsy Túrnez, Àgata Roca, Jordi Sánchez, Rut Llopis, Berto Romero	A Contracorriente Films	
A U G U S T	1	¿Quién quiere casarse con un astronauta?	David Matamoros (director/screenplay); Xènia Puiggrós (screenplay); Raúl Tejón, Raúl Fernández de Pablo, Alejandro Nones, Sabrina Praga	Alfa Pictures	
A U G U S T	8	One X Two (Uno equis dos)	Alberto Utrera (director/screenplay); Carlos Soria (screenplay); Paco León, Raúl Tejón, Kimberley Tell, Stéphanie Magnin, Adam Jeziersky	Raabta Pictures	
A U G U S T	8	Los Futbolísimos 2: El misterio del tesoro pirata	Miguel Ángel Lamata (director); Bárbara Alpuente (screenplay); Nicolás Rodicio, Joaquín Reyes, Carmen Ruiz, Stephanie Gil, William Miller, Arturo Valls, Miguel Ángel Muñoz	Filmax	
A U G U S T	14	Mr. No One (Mr. Nadie)	Miguel Ángel Calvo Buttini (director); Félix Gómez, Ainara Elejalde, Susana Córdoba, Myriam Mézières, Mariano Llorente	Barton Films	
A U G U S T	14	The Mortimers (Los Muértimer)	Álvaro Fernández Armero (director); Jelen Morales (screenplay); Víctor Clavijo, Alexandra Jiménez, Fele Martínez, Belén Rueda	Paramount Pictures	
A U G U S T	22	A Family Knight-Mare (Sin cobertura)	Mar Olid (director); Olatz Arroyo (screenplay); Alexandra Jiménez, Ernesto Sevilla, Luna Fulgencio	Sony Pictures	
A U G U S T	22	Heidi: Rescue of the Lynx (Heidi. El rescate del lince)	Tobias Schwarz (director); Rob Sprackling (screenplay)	SelectaVisión	(Note: Germany-Spain-Belgium co-production)
A U G U S T	22	The Collector: Mirrored Nightmares (La coleccionista)	Manuel Sanabria (director/screenplay); Óscar Gómez Chacón (screenplay); Belén López, Canco Rodríguez, Maggie Civantos, Daniel Grao, Assumpta Serna, Paco Tous	Yelmo Films	
A U G U S T	29	Bear Claw Camp (Campamento Garra de Oso)	Sílvia Quer (director); Marta Armengol, Daniel González (screenplay); Júlia Raya, Martín Abelló Sevillano, Anabel Alonso, Edu Soto, Ana Morgade, Carlos Latre	Filmax	
A U G U S T	29	The Black Land (La terra negra)	Alberto Morais (director/screenplay); Samuel del Amor (screenplay); Laia Marull, Sergi López, Andrés Gertrúdix	Syldavia Cinema	
S E P T E M B E R	5	The Talent (El talento)	Polo Menárguez (director/screenplay); Fernando León de Aranoa (screenplay); Ester Expósito, Pedro Casablanc, Mirela Balić	Tripictures	
S E P T E M B E R	5	Romería	Carla Simón (director); Llúcia Garcia, Mitch, Tristán Ulloa, Celine Tyll	Elastica	
S E P T E M B E R	5	The Penguin Lessons (Lo que aprendí de mi pinguino)	Peter Cattaneo (director); Jeff Pope (screenplay); Steve Coogan, Jonathan Pryce, Vivian El Jaber, Björn Gustafsson	Nostromo Pictures	(Note: United Kingdom-Spain co-production)
S E P T E M B E R	12	The Captive (El cautivo)	Alejandro Amenábar (director/screenplay); Alejandro Hernández (screenplay); Julio Peña, Alessandro Borghi, Miguel Rellán, Fernando Tejero, Luis Callejo, José Manuel Poga, Roberto Álamo, Luna Berroa	Buena Vista International	(Note: Spain-Italy co-production)
S E P T E M B E R	12	Jone, Sometimes (Jone, batzuetan)	Sara Fantova (director/screenplay); Núria Dunjó, Nuria Martín (screenplay), Olaia Aguayo, Josean Bengoetxea	Atera Films	
S E P T E M B E R	12	Follow My Voice (Sigue mi voz)	Inés Pintor, Pablo Santidrián (directors/screenplay); Berta Castañé, Jae Woo, Claudia Traisac	Beta Fiction	
S E P T E M B E R	12	Temps mort	Fèlix Colomer Vallès (director/screenplay); Carlos Jiménez (screenplay); Charles Thomas	A Contracorriente Films	
S E P T E M B E R	12	Resistance Reels (Caja de resistencia)	Concha Barquero, Alejandro Alvarado (directors/screenplay)	Nueve Cartas	
S E P T E M B E R	12	Solo Javier	Josepmaria Anglès (director/screenplay); Javier Sartorius	Bosco Films	
S E P T E M B E R	19	My Friend Eva (Mi amiga Eva)	Cesc Gay (director/screenplay); Eduard Sola (screenplay); Nora Navas, Juan Diego Botto, Rodrigo de la Serna	Filmax	
S E P T E M B E R	19	The Delights of the Garden (Las delicias del jardín)	Fernando Colomo (director/screenplay); Pablo Colomo (screenplay); Fernando Colomo, Carmen Machi, Antonio Resines, María Hervás, Luis Bermejo, Brays Efe, Pablo Colomo, Javier de Juan	Vértice 360	
S E P T E M B E R	26	Maspalomas	Jose Mari Goenaga (director/screenplay); Aitor Arregi (director); José Ramón Soroiz, Nagore Aranburu	BTeam Pictures	
S E P T E M B E R	26	The Treasure of Barracuda (El tesoro de Barracuda)	Adrià Garcia (director); Llanos Campos, Amèlia Mora (screenplay)	Filmax	
S E P T E M B E R	26	The Gentleman (Ya no quedan junglas)	Gabriel Beristain (director); Juma Fodde (screenplay); Ron Perlman, Hovik Keuchkerian, Megan Montaner, Karra Elejalde	Universal Pictures	
O C T O B E R	3	She Walks in Darkness (Un fantasma en la batalla)	Agustín Díaz Yanes (director/screenplay); Susana Abaitua, Andrés Gertrúdix, Iraia Elias, Raúl Arévalo, Jaime Chávarri	Tripictures	
O C T O B E R	3	The Osha Rule (Maleficio (La regla de Osha))	Ángel González (director/screenplay); Sara Vicente Laguna (screenplay); Mariela Garriga, Blas Polidori, Édgar Vittorino, Noakis Salazar, Felipe Londoño, Adil Koukouh, West Dubai	SelectaVisión	
O C T O B E R	3	Hidden Murder (Parecido a un asesinato)	Antonio Hernández (director); Rafa Calatayud (screenplay); Blanca Suárez, Eduardo Noriega, Tamar Novas, Claudia Mora	Vértice 360	
O C T O B E R	3	Sofia's Suspicion (La sospecha de Sofía)	Imanol Uribe (director); Álex González, Aura Garrido, Zoe Stein, Irina Bravo	Universal Pictures	
O C T O B E R	3	Strange River (Estrany riu)	Jaume Claret Muxart (director/screenplay); Meritxell Colell (screenplay); Jan Monter, Nausicaa Bonnín, Jordi Oriol, Bernat Solé, Francesco Wenz, Roc Colell	Elastica	
O C T O B E R	10	Crazy Old Lady (Vieja loca)	Martín Mauregui (director/screenplay); Carmen Maura, Daniel Hendler, Olivia Nuss	DeAPlaneta	
O C T O B E R	10	Karmele	Asier Altuna (director/screenplay); Jone Laspiur, Eneko Sagardoy, Nagore Aranburu	Caramel Films	
O C T O B E R	10	The Truce (La tregua)	Miguel Ángel Vivas (director/screenplay); Fran Carballal, Ignasi Rubio (screenplay); Arón Piper, Miguel Herrán, José Pastor	Tripictures	
O C T O B E R	16	Our Fault (Culpa nuestra)	Domingo González (director/screenplay); Sofía Cuenca (screenplay); Nicole Wallace, Gabriel Guevara, Marta Hazas, Iván Sánchez, Víctor Varona, Eva Ruiz, Goya Toledo, Gabriela Andrada, Álex Béjar, Javier Morgade, Felipe Londoño, Fran Morcillo	Amazon Prime Video	
O C T O B E R	17	The Dinner (La cena)	Manuel Gómez Pereira (director/screenplay); Joaquín Oristrell, Yolanda García Serrano (screenplay); Mario Casas, Alberto San Juan, Asier Etxeandia	A Contracorriente Films	
O C T O B E R	17	The Redemption (La deuda)	Daniel Guzmán (director); Daniel Guzmán, Itziar Ituño, Susana Abaitua	Wanda Visión	
O C T O B E R	17	Sujétame el cubata	Fernando Ayllón (director); Carolina Noriega, Dani Rovira, Fernando Albizu, Goyo Jiménez, J.J Vaquero, Jorge Cremades, Luna Vaquero, Nadia Torrijos, Patricia Conde	Alfa Pictures	
O C T O B E R	24	Sundays (Los domingos)	Alauda Ruiz de Azúa (director/screenplay); Blanca Soroa, Patricia López Arnaiz, Miguel Garcés	BTeam Pictures	
O C T O B E R	24	Decorado	Alberto Vázquez (director/screenplay); Francesc Xavier Manuel Ruiz (screenplay)	Barton Films	
O C T O B E R	24	Pet Peeves (Pequeños calvarios)	Javier Polo (director); Arturo Valls, Berta Vázquez, Andrea Duro, Pablo Molinero, Marta Belenguer, Vito Sanz, Enrique Arce, Javier Coronas	Syldavia Cinema	
O C T O B E R	31	Los Tigres	Alberto Rodríguez (director/screenplay); Rafael Cobos (screenplay); Antonio de la Torre, Bárbara Lennie, Joaquín Núñez	Buena Vista International	
O C T O B E R	31	Cuerpos locos	Ana Murugarren (director/screenplay), Ana Galán (screenplay); Paz Padilla, Maia Zaitegi, Antonio Resines	A Contracorriente Films	
N O V E M B E R	7	Subsuelo	Fernando Franco (director); Julia Martínez, Diego Garisa, Nacho Sánchez, Sonia Almarcha, Itzan Escamilla	LaZona Pictures	
N O V E M B E R	7	Always Winter (Siempre es invierno)	David Trueba (director/screenplay); David Verdaguer, Isabelle Renauld, Amaia Salamanca	BTeam Pictures	
N O V E M B E R	7	Leo & Lou	Carlos Solano (director/screenplay); Carlos Camba Tomé (screenplay); Isak Férriz, Julia Sulleiro, Manuel Manquiña	Filmax	
N O V E M B E R	7	Reversion (Reversión)	Jacob Santana (director/screenplay); Frank Ariza, Marco Lagarde (screenplay); Jaime Lorente, Belén Rueda, Fernando Cayo, Manu Vega	AF Pictures	
N O V E M B E R	14	Gaua	Paul Urkijo Alijo (director/screenplay); Yune Nogueiras, Ane Gabarain, Elena Irureta, Iñake Irastorza	Filmax	
N O V E M B E R	14	Every Side of the Bed (Todos los lados de la cama)	Samantha López Speranza (director); Carlos del Hoyo, Irene Bohoyo (screenplay); Ernesto Alterio, Pilar Castro, Jan Buxaderas, Lucía Caraballo, Natalia Verbeke, Alberto San Juan, María Esteve, Secun de la Rosa, Guillermo Toledo, Sergio Abelaira	Buena Vista International	
N O V E M B E R	21	Sleepless City (Ciudad sin sueño)	Guillermo Galoe (director/screenplay); Víctor Alonso Berbel (screenplay); Antonio Fernández Gabarre, Bilal Sedraoui	BTeam Pictures	
N O V E M B E R	21	Olivia and the Invisible Earthquake (L'Olívia i el terratrèmol invisible)	Irene Iborra (director/screenplay); Maite Carranza, Júlia Prats (screenplay)	Filmax	
N O V E M B E R	28	Singular	Alberto Gastesi (director/screenplay); Álex Merino (screenplay); Patricia López Arnaiz, Javier Rey, Miguel Iriarte	Warner Bros. Pictures	
N O V E M B E R	28	Flores para Antonio	Elena Molina, Isaki Lacuesta (directors/screenplay); Antonio Flores, Alba Flores, Ana Villa, Rosario Flores, Lolita Flores	A Contracorriente Films	
N O V E M B E R	28	Coartadas	Martín Cuervo (director); Curro Velázquez, Benjamín Herranz (screenplay), Jaime Lorente, Adriana Torrebejano, Leo Harlem, Llum Barrera, Antón Lofer, Ana Jara, Paula Prendes, Salva Reina, Mariam Hernández	Beta Fiction	
N O V E M B E R	28	Beef (Ruido)	Ingride Santos (director/screenplay); Lluís Segura (screenplay); Latifa Drame, Judith Álvarez, Asaari Bibang	Vercine	
N O V E M B E R	28	Awakening Beauty (Bella)	Manuel H. Martín, Amparo Martínez Barco (directors)	Syldavia Cinema	
D E C E M B E R	5	Golpes	Rafael Cobos (director/screenplay); Fernando Navarro (screenplay); Luis Tosar, Jesús Carroza, Teresa Garzón	A Contracorriente Films	
D E C E M B E R	5	Me has robado el corazón	Chus Gutiérrez (director); Óscar Casas, Ana Jara, Luis Zahera	Sony Pictures	
D E C E M B E R	5	Amira's Land (La tierra de Amira)	Roberto Jiménez (director) Pedro García Ríos, Rodrigo Martín (screenplay); Mina El Hammani, Manuel Morón, Pilar Gómez	Filmax	
D E C E M B E R	5	Papers (Papeles)	Arturo Montenegro (director); Megan Montaner, Carlos Bardem, Antonio Dechent, Gustavo Bassani, Jaime Newbal, Nick Romano, Agustín Della Corte, Verónica Ortiz	#ConUnPack	
D E C E M B E R	5	Wolf Beach (Playa de Lobos)	Javier Veiga (director/screenplay); Guillermo Francella, Dani Rovira	Tripictures	
D E C E M B E R	5	The Night My Dad Saved Christmas 2 (La Navidad en sus manos 2)	Joaquín Mazón (director); Francisco Arnal, Daniel Monedero (screenplay); Ernesto Sevilla, Santiago Segura, Unax Hayden, Pablo Chiapella, Joaquín Reyes, Josema Yuste, María Botto, Emilio Gavira	Netflix	
D E C E M B E R	12	Frontier (Frontera)	Judith Colell (director); Miguel Ibáñez Monroy, Gerard Giménez (screenplay); Miki Esparbé, Maria Rodríguez Soto, Asier Etxeandia, Bruna Cusí, Jordi Sánchez, Kevin Janssens	Filmax	
D E C E M B E R	12	Balearic	Ion de Sosa (director/screenplay); Juan González, Chema García Ibarra, Julián Génisson, Lorena Iglesias (screenplay); Lara Gallo, Elias Hwidar, Ada Tormo	Silencio Cinema	
D E C E M B E R	12	Fragments (Fragmentos)	Horacio Alcalá (director); Frank Ariza (screenplay); Asia Ortega, Manu Vega, Emma Suárez, José Luis García Pérez	AF Pictures	
D E C E M B E R	12	Tell Me Softly (Dímelo bajito)	Denis Rovira (director); Alícia Falcó, Fernando Lindez, Diego Vidales, Celia Freijeiro, Patricia Vico, Andrés Velencoso, Eve Ryan, Fernando Nagore	Amazon Prime Video	
D E C E M B E R	12	Aro berria	Irati Gorostidi (director/screenplay); Maite Mugerza, Oscar Pascual, Edurne Azkarate	Elastica	
D E C E M B E R	19	Emergency Exit	Lluís Miñarro (director/screenplay); Marisa Paredes, Emma Suárez, Oriol Pla	Sideral Cinema	
D E C E M B E R	24	Ariel	Lois Patiño (director); Irene Escolar, Agustina Muñoz	Atalante	

== Box office ==
The ten highest-grossing Spanish films in 2025, by in-year domestic box office gross revenue, were as follows:

Highest-grossing Spanish films of 2025
Rank	Title	Distributor	Admissions	Domestic gross (€)
1	Father There Is Only One 5 (Padre no hay más que uno 5)	Sony Pictures	2,043,434	13,406,008
2	The Captive (El cautivo)	Buena Vista International	792,007	5,284,665
3	Wolfgang (Wolfgang (extraordinari))	Universal Pictures	597,938	3,974,083
4	Sundays (Los domingos)	BTeam Pictures	628,500	3,946,830
5	The Dinner (La cena)	A Contracorriente Films	587,645	3,606,931
6	McMansion (El casoplón)	Buena Vista International	489,967	3,311,753
7	Un funeral de locos	Sony Pictures	437,336	3,024,460
8	A Family Knight-Mare (Sin cobertura)	Sony Pictures	454,350	2,925,496
9	Sirāt (Sirat, trance en el desierto)	BTeam Pictures	438,644	2,899,613
10	Romería	Elastica	276,083	1,783,277

== See also ==
- 40th Goya Awards
- List of 2025 box office number-one films in Spain
