= Gaua (film) =

- Theatrical release poster
- Directed by: Paul Urkijo Alijo
- Screenplay by: Paul Urkijo Alijo
- Produced by: Ander Sagardoy; Ander Barinaga-Rementeria; Xabier Berzosa; Paul Urkijo Alijo; Fernando Larrondo
- Starring: Yune Nogueiras; Elena Irureta; Ane Gabarain; Iñake Irastorza
- Cinematography: Gorka Gómez Andreu
- Edited by: Elena Ruiz
- Music by: Aránzazu Calleja; Maite Arroitajauregi
- Production companies: Irusoin; Ikusgarri; Gaua AIE; Vilaüt Films; 34T LLC
- Distributed by: Filmax
- Release dates: 11 October 2025 (Sitges); 14 November 2025 (Spain)
- Running time: 91 minutes
- Countries: Spain; United States
- Language: Basque

Gaua is a 2025 historical fantasy drama film directed by Paul Urkijo Alijo. Shot in Basque, it stars Yune Nogueiras along with Elena Irureta, Ane Gabarain, and Iñake Irastorza.

The film premiered at the 58th Sitges Film Festival on 11 October 2025 ahead of its Spanish theatrical release by Filmax on 14 November 2025.

== Plot ==
Set in the 17th century against the backdrop of witch hunting, the plot follows a woman (Kattalin) who ventures into the forest at night and comes across three storytelling women.

== Cast ==
- Yune Nogueiras as Kattalin
- Ane Gabarain as Beltra
- Elena Irureta as Graxiana
- Iñake Irastorza as Remedios
- Xabi Jabato as Kattalin's husband
- Erika Olaizola as Maritxu
- Manex Fuchs as Mateo
- Elena Uriz as Estertxi

== Production ==
The project was publicly presented at the 57th Sitges Film Festival during the 'Sitges FanPitch' event on 7 October 2024. Produced by Irusoin, Ikusgarri Films, Gaua AIE, Vilaüt Films, and 34T, the film is the first collaboration of Urkijo with Basque outfit Irusoin. It also had the backing from EiTB, Prime Video, RTVE, ICAA, the Basque Government, Ayuntamiento de Vitoria-Gasteiz, and the Álava Chartered Deputation. Filming was reported to have started on 20 January 2025. On 27 January 2025, cast members Yune Nogueiras (lead), Ane Gabarain, Elena Irureta, Iñake Irastorza, Xabi Jabato, Erika Olaizola, Manex Fuchs, and Elena Uriz were revealed. It is fully shot in Basque.

Urkijo handled influences that included the ethnographic research of Basque priest Jose Miguel Barandiaran, Mike Mignola's work, Goya's Black Paintings and Neil Jordan's The Company of Wolves.

== Release ==
Gaua had its world premiere at the 58th Sitges Film Festival on 11 October 2025. Filmax handled theatrical distribution in Spain as well as international sales. The film is scheduled to be released theatrically in Spain on 14 November 2025. For its international premiere, Gaua made it to the 'Harbour' programme of the 55th International Film Festival Rotterdam.

== Reception ==
Javier Ocaña of El País lamented that "subtlety is invisible in Gaua, with one-dimensional characters, good guys and bad guys from conventional fantasy films", with the film finding its way by leaving behind the "discursive thickness of its first half with a second part that is much more spectacular and freer in its use of special effects".

Miguel Ángel Romero of Cinemanía rated Gaua 4 out of 5 stars, describing it as a "a film that that goes from less to more, reaching its climax thanks to Kattalin, played by the outstanding Yune Nogueiras, and a coven worthy of Elena Irureta, Ane Gabarain, and Iñake Irastorza".

Carmen L. Lobo of La Razón rated the film 4 out of 5 stars, highlighting "the terrifying, so well-shot and orgiastic coven of the final stretch" as the best thing about the film.

== Accolades ==
Award / Festival	Date of ceremony	Category	Recipient(s)	Result	Ref.
Sitges Film Festival	19 October 2025	Best Feature Film	Gaua	Pending	
Goya Awards	28 February 2026	Best Costume Design	Nerea Torrijos	Nominated	
Goya Awards	28 February 2026	Best Makeup and Hairstyles	Patricia López, Paco Rodríguez H., Nacho Díaz	Nominated	
Goya Awards	28 February 2026	Best Special Effects	Jon Serrano, Mariano García Marty, David Heras, Iñaki Gil "Ketxu"	Nominated	

== See also ==
- List of Spanish films of 2025
