= Samsara (2023 film) =

2001 film by Lois Patiño

- Official poster
- Directed by: Lois Patiño
- Written by: Lois Patiño; Garbiñe Ortega
- Starring: Amid Keomany; Toumor Xiong; Simone Milavanh; Mariam Vuaa Mtego; Juwairiya Idrisa Uwesu
- Cinematography: Mauro Herce; Jessica Sarah Rinland
- Production company: Señor y Señora
- Release date: 2023
- Running time: 113 minutes
- Country: Spain
- Languages: Lao; Swahili

Samsara (also known as Dream of Reincarnation) is a 2023 docufiction drama film directed by Lois Patiño and written by Patiño and Garbiñe Ortega. It follows a dying woman in Laos and a baby goat on a Zanzibar seaweed farm. It premiered on 20 February 2023 at the 73rd Berlin International Film Festival, where it won the Jury Special Award in the Encounters section. It was released in Spain on 20 December 2023.

== Summary ==
The film begins with a boy reading the Bardo Thodol to Mon (Simone Milavanh), an elderly woman. Mon dies and text on-screen invites the audience to shut their eyes in order to experience the following 15-minute "guided meditation" sequence of abstract light and color alongside a variety of sound. The story then continues on to a young goat born on a shoreline community of Zanzibar.

== Production ==
The film was shot on 16 mm film with two different cinematographers for each half (Mauro Herce and Jessica Sarah Rinland). The meditation segment of the film was inspired by Derek Jarman's Blue (1993) and the hypnagogic works of Stan Brakhage. The dialogue is mainly in the Lao and Swahili languages.

== Reception ==
Wendy Ide from The Guardian compared the film to Michelangelo Frammartino’s documentary Le Quattro Volte and summarized Patiño's Samsara as a "strikingly original and profound artwork." Strand Magazine called the film "visually delicious, structurally intriguing, and textually profound," encouraging a theatrical experience for the meditation sequence. Ben Nicholson from Sight and Sound appreciated the use of two different cinematographers, stating how "the passage between them allows us to marvel at cinema’s miraculous capacity for the transportive and sublime."
