= Antes de Nós =

- Theatrical release poster
- Directed by: Ángeles Huerta
- Screenplay by: Pepe Coira
- Produced by: Zaza Ceballos
- Starring: Xoán Forneas; Cris Iglesias; Nancho Novo
- Cinematography: Lucía C. Pan
- Edited by: Lucía Iglesias
- Music by: Sofía Oriana Infante
- Production company: Retrincos AIE
- Distributed by: Atalante
- Release dates: 22 May 2025 (Cans); 23 May 2025 (Spain)
- Country: Spain
- Language: Galician

Antes de Nós is a 2025 Spanish biographical drama film directed by Ángeles Huerta and written by Pepe Coira exploring the early years of Galician pater patriae Castelao. It stars Xoán Forneas alongside Cris Iglesias and Nancho Novo.

== Plot ==
The plot explores two periods in the life of Castelao: in 1918, when he left his post as a civil servant to work as a doctor in Rianxo during the flu pandemic and 1929, when he travelled to Brittany with his wife Virxinia after they lost their son.

== Cast ==
- Xoán Forneas as Castelao
- Cris Iglesias as Virxinia Pereira
- Nancho Novo as Sobral
- Manuel Cortés as Castelao's father
- Adrián Ríos as Moure
- Aldám Santos Vilela as Castelao's and Virxinia's son

== Production ==
The film is a Retrincos AIE production with the participation of TVG, backing from Xunta de Galicia and ICAA, and the collaboration of Diputación de Pontevedra, Diputación de Lugo, Diputación de Ourense, and Concello de Pontevedra. The music score was authored by Sofía Oriana Infante and As Boubas.

Filming started on 2 September 2024. Shooting locations included Rianxo and Pontevedra.

== Release ==
The film opened the 22nd Cans Festival on 22 May 2025. Distributed by Atalante, it was released theatrically in Spain on 23 May 2025.

== Reception ==
Philipp Engel of La Vanguardia rated the film 3 out of 5 stars, billing it as a "measured and elegant period drama".

Paula Arantzazu Ruiz of Cinemanía rated the film 3 out of 5 stars, writing that it "manages to break in some moments the usual biopic tropes".

== See also ==
- List of Spanish films of 2025
