= Coartadas =

- Theatrical release poster
- Directed by: Martín Cuervo
- Screenplay by: Curro Velázquez; Benjamín Herranz
- Based on: Alibi.com by Julien Arruti, Philippe Lacheau, and Pierre Dudan
- Produced by: Mercedes Gamero; Pablo Nogueroles; Ignacio Corrales; Eduardo Campoy
- Starring: Jaime Lorente; Adriana Torrebejano; Leo Harlem; Llum Barrera; Antón Lofer; Ana Jara; Paula Prendes; Salva Reina; Mariam Hernández
- Cinematography: Pablo Bürmann
- Edited by: Ángel Hernández Zoido
- Music by: Iván Valdés
- Production companies: Buendía Estudios Canarias; Secuoya Studios; Beta Fiction Spain; Álamo Producciones
- Distributed by: Beta Fiction Spain
- Release date: 28 November 2025
- Running time: 94 minutes
- Country: Spain
- Language: Spanish

Coartadas is a 2025 Spanish comedy film directed by Martín Cuervo based on the 2017 French film Alibi.com. It stars Jaime Lorente alongside Adriana Torrebejano and Leo Harlem.

== Plot ==
Miguel, the owner of an alibi agency, crashes with a car on the judge Noelia, and then they fall for each other at the hospital. As Noelia hates lies and fraudsters, Miguel claims to lead a funerary services company instead. The situation gets a crazier turn when José María (Noelia's father and Miguel's client) comes into action.

== Cast ==
- Jaime Lorente as Miguel
- Adriana Torrebejano as Noelia
- Leo Harlem
- Llum Barrera
- Antón Lofer
- Ana Jara
- Paula Prendes
- Salva Reina
- Mariam Hernández

== Production ==
Coartadas is a Buendía Estudios Canarias, Secuoya Studios, Beta Fiction Spain, and Álamo Producciones production, and it had the participation of Atresmedia and Movistar Plus+. It was shot in Tenerife.

== Release ==
Distributed by Beta Fiction, the film was released theatrically in Spain on 28 November 2025.

== Reception ==
In a wholly negative review, Manuel J. Lombardo of Diario de Sevilla assessed Coartadas as a "sclerotic romantic comedy" "who thinks it is funny and cheeky without actually being so".

Sergio F. Pinilla of Cinemanía rated the film 2½ out of 5 stars, writing that the blend of buddy movie and romantic comedy features a "gaudy and frivolous" humour.

== See also ==
- List of Spanish films of 2025
