= Intimacy (TV series) =

Spanish drama series

- Intimidad
- Genre: Drama
- Created by: Verónica Fernández; Laura Sarmiento
- Written by: Verónica Fernández; Laura Sarmiento
- Directed by: Jorge Torregrossa; Ben Gutteridge; Marta Font; Koldo Almandoz
- Starring: Itziar Ituño; Patricia López Arnaiz; Emma Suárez; Verónica Echegui; Ana Wagener; Yune Nogueiras
- Country of origin: Spain
- Original language: Spanish
- No. of seasons: 1
- No. of episodes: 8

Production
- Production location: Basque Country
- Running time: 44–51 min
- Production company: Txintxua Films

Original release
- Network: Netflix
- Release: 10 June 2022

Intimacy (Spanish: Intimidad) is a Spanish drama television series created by Verónica Fernández and Laura Sarmiento and produced by Txintxua Films for Netflix. It stars Itziar Ituño, Patricia López Arnaiz, Emma Suárez, Verónica Echegui, Ana Wagener and Yune Nogueiras. It premiered on 10 June 2022.

== Premise ==
A sex tape of a politician is leaked when she is running for the Mayorship of Bilbao.

== Cast ==
- Itziar Ituño as Malen Zubiri
- Patricia López Arnaiz as Begoña Uribe
- Emma Suárez as Miren
- Verónica Echegui as Ane Uribe
- Ana Wagener as Alicia Vásquez
- Yune Nogueiras as Leire
- Marc Martínez as Alfredo
- Jaime Zatarain as Kepa
- Eduardo Lloveras as César Barretxeguren
- Francesco Carril as Hugo
- Fernando Albizu as Txema Lezkano
- Iñigo Aranburu as Gorka
- Iraia Elias as Itxaso
- Miguel Garcés as Bizen
- Miren Gaztañaga as Amaia
- Jon Guridi as Julen
- Rebeca Mantellán as Maria
- Arnatz Puertas as Xabi
- Hegoi Zubizarreta as Ibai
- César Sarachu as Juan Mari
- Ione Irazabal as Luz
- Elisabeth Larena as Idoia
- Amancay Gaztañaga as Oihane
- Mikel Tello as Andoni Segurola
- Miren Tirapu as Maider
- Kandido Uranga as Peio
- Anartz Zuazua as Manu
- Luisa Gavasa as Maite
- Mikel Losada as Jon
- Aitor Merino as Jokin
- Gabriel Ocina as Olarriaga
- Juan Viadas as Paco
- Leire Ucha as Irati
- Sandra Ferrús as Nagore
- Antton Bastero as Etxeburu
- Iñaki Beraetxe as Larrea
- Ainara Ortega as Lorea
- Iban Garate as himself (ETB 1 anchor)
- Ilaski Serrano as herself (ETB 1 anchor)

== Accolades ==
Year	Award	Category	Nominee(s)	Result	Ref.
2022	24th Iris Awards	Best Actress	Itziar Ituño	Nominated	
2022	24th Iris Awards	Best Fiction		Nominated	
2022	24th Iris Awards	Best Screenplay	Verónica Fernández, Laura Sarmiento	Won	
2022	24th Iris Awards	Best Fiction Direction	Jorge Torregrossa, Ben Gutteridge, Koldo Almandoz, Marta Font	Won	
2022	28th Forqué Awards	Best TV Actress	Itziar Ituño	Nominated	
2023	10th Feroz Awards	Best Drama Series		Nominated	
2023	10th Feroz Awards	Best Actress in a TV Series	Itziar Ituño	Nominated	
2023	10th Feroz Awards	Best Supporting Actress in a TV Series	Patricia López Arnaiz	Won	
2023	10th Feroz Awards	Best Screenplay in a TV Series	Verónica Fernández, Laura Sarmiento, José Luis Martín	Nominated	
2023	31st Actors and Actresses Union Awards	Best Television Actress in a Minor Role	Elisabeth Larena	Nominated	
