= McMansion (film) =

- Theatrical release poster
- Spanish: El casoplón
- Directed by: Joaquín Mazón
- Written by: Roberto Jiménez
- Produced by: Juan Moreno; Guillermo Sempere; Koldo Zuazua
- Starring: Raquel Guerrero; Pablo Chiapella; Nerea Pascual; Álvaro Lafuente; Noah Casas; Edurne
- Cinematography: Chiqui Palma
- Edited by: Jani Madrileño
- Music by: Vicente Ortiz
- Production companies: Kowalski Films; Feelgood Media; Casoplón AIE; Bajo el mismo techo AIE
- Distributed by: Buena Vista International
- Release date: 16 April 2025
- Country: Spain
- Language: Spanish

McMansion (Spanish: El casoplón) is a 2025 Spanish comedy film directed by Joaquín Mazón and written by Roberto Jiménez. It stars Pablo Chiapella and Raquel Guerrero.

== Plot ==
Gardener Carlos takes his wife Toñi and their three children to the empty luxury mansion in La Moraleja he is working in as their apartment's air conditioning system is not working during the scorching summer, turning out to be some unforgettable holidays.

== Cast ==
- Pablo Chiapella as Carlos
- Raquel Guerrero as Toñi
- Mónica Solaun as agente inmobiliaria ('real estate agent')
- Edurne as herself
- Iñaki Miramón as jefe de Carlos ('Carlos' boss')
- María Córdoba as Estefanía
- Nerea Pascual as Alba
- Álvaro Lafuente as Mateo
- Noah Casas as Elisa

== Production ==
McMansion is a Kowalski Films and Feelgood Media production, with the participation of RTVE, EiTB, and Movistar Plus+. Shooting locations included Madrid and Bilbao.

== Release ==
Distributed by Buena Vista International, the film was released theatrically in Spain on 16 April 2025.

== Reception ==
Pablo Vázquez of Fotogramas rated the film 3 out of 5 stars, highlighting Guerrero, "a scenic whirlwind", and her chemistry with Chiapella as the best thing about the film, while lamenting that Edurne does not know how to (or is not allowed to) laugh at herself.

Manuel J. Lombardo of Diario de Sevilla rated the film 1 out of 5 stars, lamenting that the self-serving formula [of the Segura family] is fastly and bluntly deployed "for all audiences, that is to say, for none".

== See also ==
- List of Spanish films of 2025
