= Death at a Funeral =

Death at a Funeral may refer to:

- Death at a Funeral (2007 film), a British comedy film
- Death at a Funeral (2010 film), an American remake of the 2007 film
