= Ariel (2025 film) =

- Theatrical release poster
- Directed by: Lois Patiño
- Written by: Lois Patiño
- Story by: Matías Piñeiro; Lois Patiño
- Based on: The Tempest by William Shakespeare
- Produced by: Rodrigo Areias; Roi Carballido; Beli Martínez
- Starring: Agustina Muñoz; Irene Escolar; Hugo Torres; José Díaz; Marta Pazos; Susana Salema; César Lima; Filipe Porteiro
- Cinematography: Ion de Sosa
- Edited by: Lois Patiño
- Distributed by: Atalante Cinema
- Release dates: 1 February 2025 (IFFR); 24 December 2025 (Spain)
- Running time: 104 minutes
- Countries: Spain; Portugal
- Languages: Spanish; Portuguese; Galician

Ariel is a 2025 meta-narrative film directed by Lois Patiño based on the play The Tempest by William Shakespeare. It stars Agustina Muñoz and Irene Escolar. It is a Spanish-Portuguese co-production.

== Plot ==
Argentine actress Agustina travels to the Azores to perform in a play of The Tempest, but she finds the inhabitants of one of the islands to be under a collective enchantment.

== Cast ==
- Agustina Muñoz as Agustina
- Irene Escolar as herself / Ariel
- Agustina Muñoz as Agustina
- Hugo Torres as Stephano
- José Díaz as Trinculo
- Marta Pazos as Voadora
- Susana Salema as Próspero
- César Lima as Calibán 1
- Filipe Porteiro as Calibán 2
- Keven Santos as Xemelgo 1
- Jason Santos as Xemelgo 2
- Ana Odete Pérez as Tía
- Saladin Fernández as Tía
- Laura Rezende as Xulieta
- Elisa Muraro as Romeo

== Production ==
Inspired by the play The Tempest, the film also incorporates to a lesser extent samples from other Shakespeare's works such as Hamlet, Macbeth, and Othello, as well as from Pirandello. Ion de Sosa took over cinematography duties whilst Cora Patiño worked as art director. Shooting took place in the Azores and Galicia from April to May 2023.

== Release ==
Ariel had its world premiere on 1 February 2025 in the 'Harbour' section of 54th International Film Festival Rotterdam (IFFR). For its Spanish premiere, it opened the 'Curtocircuíto' International Film and Visual Arts Festival on 1 July 2025. For its U.S. premiere, it received a screening at the Refocus Film Festival on 11 October 2025. It was also programmed in the 'Xaloc' section of the 40th Mostra de València, the 'Create' strand of the 2025 BFI London Film Festival, and the 'Pases Especiales' selection of the 63rd Gijón International Film Festival. Distributed by Atalante Cinema, it is scheduled to be released theatrically in Spain on 24 December 2025.

== Reception ==
David Katz of Cineuropa assessed that if you exposed "a good edition of William Shakespeare's complete works to mild hallucinogens, the end result would be something" like the film.

== See also ==
- List of Spanish films of 2025
