= Nick Meyer =

American film producer

Nick Meyer is an American film producer. He is the CEO of Sierra/Affinity and president of film operations for Entertainment One. Meyer was the president of Paramount Vantage until December 2008. In 2007, with Meyer as co-head of Paramount, the Studio received 19 Academy Award nominations. Formerly, Meyer was the president of Lionsgate International, a division of Lionsgate. He founded Sierra Pictures in 2009. In 2011, his Sierra Pictures merged with film sales company Affinity International to become Sierra/Affinity.

In addition to representing sales of third party films, Sierra/Affinity is as the exclusive sales agent for films developed and produced by Sidney Kimmel Entertainment, Bold Films and Sierra Pictures. Following Entertainment One's (eOne) strategic equity investment in Sierra Pictures in January 2016, the international sales and distribution of films produced and acquired by eOne Features, as well as eOne-distributed films from The Mark Gordon Company, are handled by Sierra/Affinity outside of Canada, the UK, Australia/New Zealand, Benelux and Spain, where eOne directly distributes films. In July 2018, eOne acquired the remaining stake in the company and Meyer was appointed as president of the company's film operations. On August 22, 2019, Hasbro announced it will acquire eOne for $4 billion. In August 2023, Hasbro announced that it would sell the assets to Lionsgate for $500 million. The deal closed on December 27, 2023.

He is a graduate of Wesleyan University and an MA from Middlebury. He is a member of the ADL Entertainment Leadership Council to combat antisemitism.
