= Adriana Torrebejano =

Spanish actress

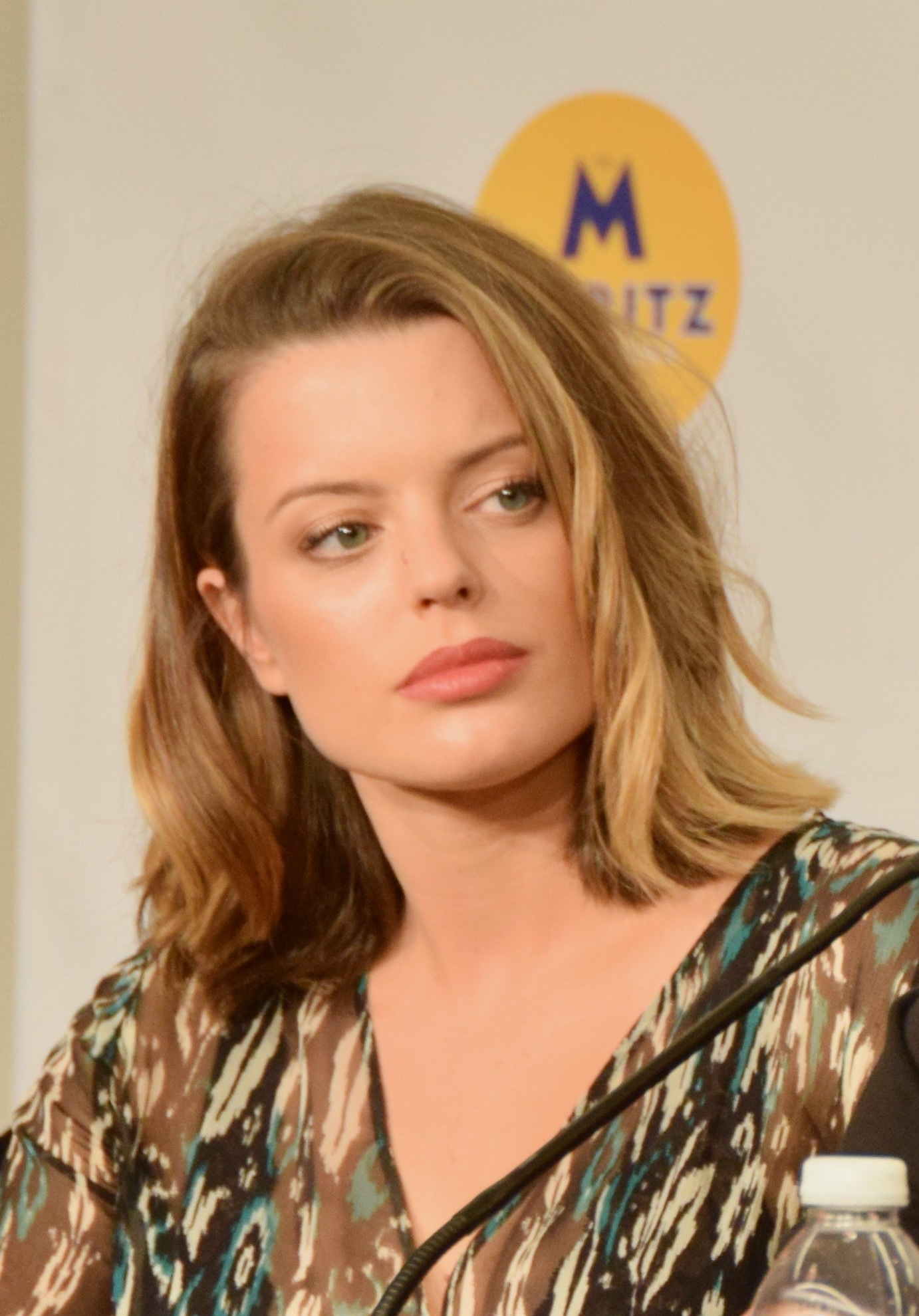
- Torrebejano at Sitges Film Festival in 2018
- Born: Adriana Torrebejano Giménez; 3 November 1991 (age 35); Barcelona, Spain
- Occupation: Actress
- Height: 1.65 m (5 ft 5 in)

Adriana Torrebejano Giménez (3 November 1991) is a Spanish actress.

She played Sandra with Ana Obregón in the Antena 3 TV series Ellas y el sexo débil. From 2010 to 2013 she played Isabel Lobo in the Telecinco TV series Tierra de lobos. In 2012 she appeared in the TV miniseries El Rey in the role of the Countess Olghina di Robilant. In 2015 she played Sol in El secreto de Puente Viejo.

== Biography ==
Born on November 3, 1991, and raised in Castellbisbal, in the province of Barcelona, Torrebejano's first television role came on Televisión Española in the series Abuela de verano, where she played Aurora when she was only 12 years old. The series was very well received by the public, and she filmed 13 episodes.

A year later, Adriana joined the cast of the Antena 3 series Ellas y el sexo débil, where she played Sandra. Although the series started with good ratings, it soon began to decline, and after only three episodes had been aired, the network decided to cancel it. That same year, the actress recorded three episodes of the Telecinco series Hospital Central, where she played Ana.

In 2007, she signed on for the new Antena 3 series C.L.A. No somos ángeles, where she played Carlota. That same year, Torrebejano recorded three episodes for the TVE series Cuéntame cómo pasó, where she played Rosario, and also made a cameo appearance in the Telecinco series El comisario.

In 2008, she played Lucía in the series Fuera de lugar, where she recorded 11 episodes. That same year, she recorded an episode for the first season of Antena 3's teen series Física o química, where she played Cristina, and also appeared in an episode of the second season of the series Cuenta atrás, broadcast on Cuatro (TV channel).

A year later, in 2009, Torrebejano made a cameo appearance in the Telecinco series Acusados, and a few months later the network signed her up for its new series De repente, los Gómez, where she played Cris Tamayo.

In 2010, Torrebejano was selected to be part of the Telecinco series Tierra de lobos, where she played Isabel Lobo until 2013. This series was a huge hit on television, and she appeared in 41 of the 42 episodes that made up the series (she did not appear in the last episode).

A year after being signed by Tierra de lobos, she also joined the cast of the 19th season of the television series Hospital Central, where she played Irene Valencia. She juggled filming for both series in 2011. She premiered three plays: Sexo 10.0 (alongside Silvia Alonso and Jorge Suquet), Futuro 10.0, and Los que besan bien (alongside Javier Calvo (actor) and Fernando Tielve).

In 2012, she recorded the TV movie El Rey for Telecinco, which premiered in 2014, where she played the role of Countess Olghina. That same year, she starred in the play Perversiones sexuales en Chicago, alongside Javier Pereira, Cristina Alcázar, and Javier Mora.

At the end of 2013, she signed up for the daily television series Ciega a citas, broadcast on Cuatro, where she played Beatriz. Between 2013 and 2015, she starred in the play La vida resuelta, by Marta Sánchez and David S. Olivas. In 2015, she joined the Antena 3 afternoon series El secreto de Puente Viejo, where she played Sol Santacruz for more than 350 episodes.

In 2016, the actress was cast in the film La madriguera, directed by Kurro González and Francisco Conde.

== Filmography ==
=== Films ===
- La noche rota (2011) as Chica bus
- Tarde (2012) as Ella
- La madriguera (2016) as Caterina
- Luz azul (2018) as Voz Luz Azul
- Gun City (2018) as Lola
- Mañana y siempre (2018)
- Políticamente incorrectos (2024) as Laura
- Coartadas (2025) as Noelia

2025 White Rush

=== TV ===
- Hospital Valle Norte (2018)
- La resistencia (2018)
- Capítulo 0 (2018) as Clienta
- Cuerpo de élite (2018) as Berta Capdevila
- El secreto de Puente Viejo (2015-2017) as Sol Santacruz
- El Rey (2014) as Condesa Olghina
- Ciega a citas (2014) as Beatriz
- Tierra de lobos (2010-2014) as Isabel Lobo
- Con el culo al aire (2013) as Cris
- Hospital Central (2006-2011) as Irene Valencia / Ana
- De repente, los Gómez (2009) as Cris Tamayo
- Acusados (2009) as Amiga de Patricia
- Fuera de lugar (2008) as Lucía Hidalgo
- Física o química (2008) as Cristina
- Cuéntame cómo pasó (2007) as Rosario
- El comisario (2007) as Yolanda Cobos
- C.L.A. No somos ángeles (2007) as Carlota
- Ellas y el sexo débil (2006) as Sandra
- Abuela de verano (2005) as Aurora
