= Barren Land =

- Theatrical release poster
- Spanish: Tierra de nadie
- Directed by: Albert Pintó
- Screenplay by: Fernando Navarro
- Story by: Álvaro Ariza
- Produced by: Álvaro Ariza
- Starring: Luis Zahera; Karra Elejalde; Jesús Carroza
- Cinematography: David Acereto
- Edited by: Miguel Burgos
- Music by: Sara Cáceres Huerta
- Production companies: Esto también pasará; Glow; En tierra de nadie Films AIE; SDB Films
- Distributed by: Sony Pictures
- Release dates: 15 March 2025 (Málaga); 28 March 2025 (Spain)
- Countries: Spain; Mexico
- Language: Spanish

Barren Land (Spanish: Tierra de nadie) is a 2025 thriller film directed by Albert Pintó from a screenplay by Fernando Navarro starring Luis Zahera, Karra Elejalde, and Jesús Carroza.

== Plot ==
Set against the backdrop of the illegal drug trade in the province of Cádiz, the plot examines the tested friendship between Guardia Civil agent Mateo "El Gallego", resourceful bailiff Benito "El Yeye", and fisherman-turned-drug dealer Juan "El Antxale".

== Cast ==
- Luis Zahera as Mateo "el Gallego"
- Karra Elejalde as Juan "el Antxale"
- Jesús Carroza as Benito "el Yeye"
- Emilio Palacios
- Vicente Romero as "el Colorao"
- Paco Mora
- Antonio Gil
- Antonio Gómiz
- Paula Díaz
- Tamara Casellas
- Mona Martínez as Ana
- Jero Medina
- Damián Alcázar

== Production ==
The screenplay was written by Fernando Navarro from an original idea by producer Álvaro Ariza. The film is a Spanish-Mexican co-production by Esto también pasará, Glow, En tierra de nadie Films AIE and SDB Films, and it had the participation of Amazon Prime Video, RTVE, Canal Sur, Mogambo and Crea SGR, and the backing from ICAA. Filming began on 18 April 2024. The film was shot in the province of Cádiz (Cádiz, San Fernando, and Jerez de la Frontera) and the Madrid region (San Sebastián de los Reyes, El Pilar, and Campo Real).

== Release ==
Barren Land was presented at the 28th Málaga Film Festival on 15 March 2025. The film is scheduled to be released theatrically in Spain on 28 March 2025 by Sony Pictures.

== Reception ==
Pere Vall of Fotogramas rated the "energetic and vibrant" film 4 out of 5 stars, highlighting the performances from the top four cast (including Romero's) and the "brilliant" making as the best things about the film.

Begoña Piña of Cinemanía rated the film 2 out of 5 stars, lamenting that "with blurred female characters, the film becomes an anecdote".

== See also ==
- List of Spanish films of 2025
