= Christmas Balls =

- Directed by: Alexandra Leclère
- Written by: Alexandra Leclère
- Produced by: François Kraus; Denis Pineau-Valencienne
- Starring: Valérie Bonneton; Kad Merad; Noémie Lvovsky
- Cinematography: Jean-Marc Fabre
- Edited by: Marie Silvi; Loanne Trevisan
- Music by: Valentin Couineau
- Production companies: Les Films du Kiosque; TF1 Films Production; Moana Films; Umedia
- Distributed by: Sony Pictures Releasing International
- Release date: 27 November 2024
- Running time: 90 minutes
- Country: France
- Language: French
- Budget: €8 million
- Box office: $9 million

Christmas Balls (French: Les Boules de Noël) is a 2024 French Christmas comedy film directed and written by Alexandra Leclère.

The film was released in France on 27 November 2024.

== Cast ==
- Valérie Bonneton as Nathalie
- Kad Merad as Antonin
- Noémie Lvovsky as Nicole

== Production ==
=== Development ===
When Alexandra Leclère met producers François Kraus and Denis Pineau-Valencienne, they came up with an idea of making a "cruel and funny" Christmas film.

=== Casting ===
Christmas Balls marks the third collaboration between Valérie Bonneton and Alexandra Leclère.

=== Filming ===
Filming took place at Nouvelle-Aquitaine from June 17 to August 2, 2024.

== Release ==
Christmas Balls was released in France on 27 November 2024.

== Reception ==
Didier Stiers of Le Soir reviewed the film, and has written "A crazy and sometimes acidic comedy".
