= A Family Knight-Mare =

- Theatrical release poster
- Spanish: Sin cobertura
- Directed by: Mar Olid
- Written by: Olatz Arroyo
- Produced by: Jaime Ortiz de Artiñano; Gonzalo Salazar Simpson; Ignacio Corrales; Luis Ferrón
- Starring: Alexandra Jiménez; Ernesto Sevilla; Luna Fulgencio; Amaia Miranda; Aimar Miranda; Luis Callejo; Pepe Viyuela; Carmen Ruiz; Salva Reina; Candela Camacho; Joaquín Reyes; Petra Martínez
- Cinematography: Luis Ángel Pérez
- Edited by: Carolina Martínez Urbina
- Music by: Vanessa Garde
- Production companies: Lazona Zinema; Buendía Estudios Bizkaia; Lazona Producciones; Atresmedia Cine
- Distributed by: Sony Pictures
- Release date: 22 August 2025
- Running time: 94 minutes
- Country: Spain
- Language: Spanish

A Family Knight-Mare (Spanish: Sin cobertura, lit. 'no coverage') is a 2025 Spanish family comedy film directed by Mar Olid and written by Olatz Arroyo. It stars Alexandra Jiménez, Ernesto Sevilla, Luna Fulgencio, and Amaia and Aimar Miranda.

== Plot ==
Dismayed by her family's problematic mobile phone use, young Rita's wish for the mobile phones to disappear takes them to the Middle Ages.

== Cast ==
- Alexandra Jiménez as Alicia
- Ernesto Sevilla
- Luna Fulgencio as Blanca
- Amaia Miranda as Rita
- Aimar Miranda as Darío
- Luis Callejo as García Fernández
- Pepe Viyuela as obispo ('bishop')
- Carmen Ruiz
- Salva Reina
- Carlos Serrano as Sancho
- Candela Camacho
- Germán Alcarazu
- Joaquín Reyes as Bermudo II
- Petra Martínez as pitonisa ('foreteller')

== Production ==
The film was produced by Lazona Zinema, Buendía Estudios Bizkaia, Lazona Producciones, and Atresmedia Cine. It also had the association of Sony Pictures Entertainment Iberia, the participation of Atresmedia and Netflix and the financial backing from ICAA and CreaSGR. Luis Ángel Pérez worked as cinematographer. Shooting locations in Biscay and Álava included Víllodas, Muskiz, Zeanuri, Otxandio, Dima, Igorre, Amorebieta, and Plentzia.

== Release ==
Distributed by Sony Pictures, the film was released theatrically in Spain on 22 August 2025.

== Reception ==
Raquel Hernández Luján of HobbyConsolas gave the film 60 points ('acceptable'), assessing that while, being "entertaining and pleasant", it does not "stand out for its sense of humor or for displaying any originality".

== See also ==
- List of Spanish films of 2025
