= Yune Nogueiras =

Spanish actress (born 1998)

- Nogueiras in 2021
- Born: 24 October 1998 (age 28); Bergara, Gipuzkoa, Spain
- Education: Dantzerti
- Occupation: Actress
- Years active: 2020–present

Yune Nogueiras (born 24 October 1998) is a Spanish actress.

== Biography ==
Nogueiras was born in Bergara. She has a brother, Iker. She originally intended to study psychology, but her father urged her to pursue her passion of acting. After finishing high school, she enrolled at Dantzerti in Bilbao. In her second year at Dantzerti, she was cast in Coven (2020), marking her film debut.

== Filmography ==
=== Film ===
Year	Title	Role	Ref.
2020	Coven	María	
2024	Undercover	Nagore	
2025	Gaua	Kattalin	
2026	The Daughters	Ane	

=== Television ===
Year	Title	Role	Notes	Ref.
2022	Intimacy	Leire	8 episodes	
2024	Detective Touré	Edurne	1 episode	
2026	Piztiak	Miren	6 episodes	
2026	Atasco	Agent	1 episode	
