= Un funeral de locos =

- Theatrical release poster
- Directed by: Manuel Gómez Pereira
- Screenplay by: Yolanda García Serrano
- Based on: Death at a Funeral by Dean Craig
- Produced by: María Luisa Gutiérrez; Álvaro Ariza
- Starring: Quim Gutiérrez; Ernesto Alterio; Inma Cuesta; Gorka Otxoa; Hugo Silva; Belén Rueda; Arturo Valls; Secun de la Rosa; Antonio Resines; Jordi Sánchez; Santi Ugalde; Esmeralda Pimentel
- Cinematography: Aitor Mantxola
- Edited by: Fran Amaro
- Music by: María Vértiz
- Production companies: Bowfinger International Pictures; Esto También Pasará; Glow Animation; Un funeral de muerte AIE; SDB Films
- Distributed by: Sony Pictures
- Release date: 11 April 2025 (Spain)
- Countries: Spain; Mexico
- Language: Spanish

Un funeral de locos is a 2025 comedy film directed by Manuel Gómez Pereira from an adapted screenplay by Yolanda García Serrano based on the British film Death at a Funeral written by Dean Craig. Its cast features Quim Gutiérrez, Ernesto Alterio, Inma Cuesta, Gorka Otxoa, Hugo Silva, Belén Rueda, Arturo Valls, Secun de la Rosa, Antonio Resines, Jordi Sánchez, Santi Ugalde, and Esmeralda Pimentel.

== Plot ==
The funeral of a Basque patriarch brings together the family members, with the meeting taking a crazy turn upon the disclosure of the deceased's best kept secret.

== Cast ==
- Quim Gutiérrez as Daniel
- Ernesto Alterio as Robert
- Inma Cuesta as Amaia
- Gorka Otxoa as Iker
- Hugo Silva
- Belén Rueda as Edurne
- Arturo Valls as Julio
- Secun de la Rosa as Héctor
- Antonio Resines as Imanol
- Jordi Sánchez
- Santi Ugalde as Bittor
- Esmeralda Pimentel

== Production ==
The screenplay was written by Yolanda García Serrano, remaking the British comedy Death at a Funeral, written by Dean Craig and directed by Frank Oz. The film is a Bowfinger International Pictures co-production with Esto También Pasará, Glow Animation, Un funeral de muerte AIE, and SDB Films, with the association of Sony Pictures Entertainment Iberia and the participation of Atresmedia, Amazon Prime Video, and CreaSGR. Shooting locations included a country house in the surroundings of San Sebastián.

== Release ==
Distributed by Sony Pictures, the film is scheduled to be released theatrically in Spain on 11 April 2025.

== See also ==
- List of Spanish films of 2025
