= Lois Patiño =

- Patiño at the Festival de Málaga, 2020
- Born: 26 January 1983 (age 43); Vigo, Galicia, Spain
- Occupations: Film director; screenwriter
- Years active: 2012–present
- Notable work: Samsara (2023)

Lois Patiño is a Spanish-Galician filmmaker known for his short film work and his feature films Samsara (2023) and Ariel (2025).

== Life ==
Born in Vigo in Galicia, Spain in 1983, Patiño studied film and art at the New York Film Academy and the Berlin University of the Arts before getting a master's degree in documentary filmmaking at the Pompeu Fabra University. Patiño directed the short films Mountain in Shadow (2012) in Iceland and Fajr (2017) in Morocco returning to Galicia. Mountain in Shadow won the Jury of the Minister Award at the Oberhausen Film Festival and Patiño received the prize for best emerging director for his film Costa da Morte (2013) at the Locarno Film Festival. Patiño then directed Samsara (2023) in Laos and Zanzibar and Ariel (2025) on the Azores. Patiño's next feature film, Adarna, is set for a 2026 release and was filmed in the Philippines, following a character named Denis who steals a supposedly magical rooster.

== Filmography ==
=== Feature films ===
Year	Title	Director	Writer	Editor	Notes
2013	Costa da Morte	Yes	No	Yes	Documentary
2020	Lúa vermella	Yes	Yes	Yes	
2023	Samsara	Yes	Yes	Yes	
2025	Ariel	Yes	Yes	No	
2026	Adarna	Yes	No	No	

=== Short films and television ===
Year	Title	Director	Writer	Editor	Notes
2012	Montaña en sombra	Yes	Yes	Yes	Short film
2013	La imagen arde	Yes	No	No	Short film
2015	Noite sem distância	Yes	No	Yes	Short film
2015	Estratos de la Imagen	Yes	No	No	Short film
2017	Fajr	Yes	Yes	Yes	Short film
2021	Sycorax	Yes	No	No	Short film; co-directed with Matías Piñeiro
2022	El sembrador de estrellas	Yes	Yes	Yes	Short film
2022	Jogo Cruzado	Yes	No	No	Television series (1 episode)
2023	Lavadoiro	Yes	Yes	Yes	Short film
