= Natalia Huarte =

Spanish actress (born 1989)

- Born: November 28, 1989 (age 36); Pamplona, Navarre, Spain
- Education: RESAD
- Occupation: Actress

Natalia Huarte (born 28 November 1989) is a Spanish actress. She won the 2024 Premios Max for Best Actress for her performance in Sarah Kane's 4.48 Psychosis and the 2026 Actors and Actresses Union Award for best supporting actress on television for Ena. Queen Victoria Eugenia.

Her career has included classical theatre with the Compañía Nacional de Teatro Clásico, the monologues Psicosis 4.48 and Leonora, television roles in Querer, Legado and Innato, and a move into film.

== Early life and training ==
Huarte was born in Pamplona on 28 November 1989. At 17, she played Mirandolina in Carlo Goldoni's La posadera at the theatre workshop of IES Navarro Villoslada; the performance earned her a special mention as best actress in the regional round of the Buero Vallejo Awards.

She studied acting at RESAD from 2007 to 2011 and completed further training at the Michael Chekhov Acting Studio in New York in 2011; she began working professionally in 2012.

== Theatre ==
Huarte performed in Lope de Vega's La noche toledana and La cortesía de España with the young company of the Compañía Nacional de Teatro Clásico. She later played Marcela in Helena Pimenta's production of Lope de Vega's El perro del hortelano, for which she won the 2019 Ercilla Award for Best Newcomer Actress.

She worked with Alfredo Sanzol on La valentía in 2018 and played Carmen in his 2021 production El bar que se tragó a todos los españoles. In 2022 she appeared in Esther F. Carrodeguas's Supernormales, directed by Iñaki Rikarte, a production about the sexuality of people with disabilities. That year she also played Claudia in Josep Maria Flotats's París 1940 at the Teatro Español.

In 2023 she appeared in Lucía Carballal's Los pálidos and in Sarah Kane's Psicosis 4.48. The latter, directed by Luz Arcas, was her first monologue. Huarte won the 2024 Premios Max for Best Actress for the performance.

She returned to the Compañía Nacional de Teatro Clásico in La fortaleza, written and directed by Carballal; the production premiered in October 2024 and Huarte performed it at the 2025 Almagro Festival. In 2025 she played the title role in Laila Ripoll's production of Natacha, based on Luisa Carnés's novel about working women in a 1930s hat workshop, at the Teatro Español.

In October 2025 Huarte starred in the premiere of Leonora, a monologue written and directed by Alberto Conejero about the surrealist artist Leonora Carrington, at Contemporánea Condeduque in Madrid. In September 2026 the production opened the Teatro de la Abadía's 2026–27 season.

== Film ==
Huarte shared the best actress award in the short-film section of the seventh FIBABC in 2017 for her work in Escala en Madrid. Her later film credits included Amparo Climent's documentary Las cartas perdidas (2021), Ángeles González-Sinde's El comensal (2022) and Javier Celay's short film Yegua (2023).

In 2025 she appeared in Ana Lambarri's Todo lo que no sé, presented in the official section of the Málaga Film Festival before its Spanish cinema release on 25 April. The film was entered in 11 categories for the 2026 Goya Awards, with Huarte listed for Best Supporting Actress. In September 2026 Huarte was cast in Ignacio Lasierra's debut feature Perseidas as Cata, a chef who returns from Uruguay to Aragón; filming was scheduled to begin on 28 September.

== Television ==
In 2018 Huarte joined the seventh season of Amar es para siempre as Carolina Álvarez de Tudela. She played Maite, one of Manuela's sisters, in Heridas, which debuted on Atresplayer Premium in 2022 before its 2023 broadcast on Antena 3. In 2024 she appeared in Alauda Ruiz de Azúa's four-part series Querer, presented at the 72nd San Sebastián International Film Festival and released on Movistar Plus+ on 17 October.

Huarte played Guadalupe Seligman in Netflix's Rotten Legacy (Legado), released globally on 16 May 2025. That year she also portrayed actress Carmen Moragas in Ena. Queen Victoria Eugenia. The role won her the 2026 Actors and Actresses Union Award for best supporting actress on television. She also played Andrea in the Netflix thriller Innato, available in Spain from 23 December 2025. In 2026 she appeared in Movistar Plus+'s Por cien millones, a dramatisation of the 1981 kidnapping of footballer Enrique Castro "Quini".
