= Kimberley Tell =

Canarian actress

- Tell in 2026
- Born: 1989; Lanzarote, Canary Islands, Spain
- Education: University of Barcelona
- Occupations: Actress, singer

Kimberley Tell (born 1989) is an actress and singer from the Canary Islands. She is known for her performances in TV series such as Hierro, Algo que celebrar and Buscando el norte.

== Biography ==
Tell was born in Lanzarote, Canary Islands, in 1989. She is the daughter of a Danish father and an English mother. She earned a degree in Fine Arts from the University of Barcelona, after which she took acting courses.

Once she finished her studies, she landed a guest role as 'Gracia de Mónaco' (Grace Kelly) in a 2014 episode of Velvet, after which she moved to Madrid. She was later given a supporting role in 2015 in the police procedural comedy series Olmos y Robles, aired on La 1, and starred in the TV series adaptation of the film Perdiendo el norte, Buscando el norte, in which she played Ulrike, a German-raised young woman without a sense of humour, keen on boasting about the purported moral high ground of Germans. She played the character 'Rose' in the comedy series Algo que celebrar, aired on Antena 3.

She performed in a main role in the 2016 feature film La Mina (The Night Watchman), a psychological thriller. She starred in the Fernando Soto's musical stage play Drac Pack, together with Najwa Nimri, Alba Flores and Anna Castillo, performed at the Teatro de la Luz Philips in Gran Vía.

Tell joined the cast of the first season of Hierro, aired on Movistar+ in 2019: she played 'Pilar', the daughter of the banana businessman suspect of the murder central to the plot of the mystery series. Tell also appeared in the role of 'Fanny' (an actress) in the 2019 series 45 revoluciones (45 rpm), a drama around the birth of a record company set in 1960s' Madrid.

Together with Itzan Escamilla, Tell co-starred in Planeta 5000, a 2020 film inspired by the religious cult of The Children of God, in which she played 'Iris', "a prostitute of Jesus". She performed the role of 'Olivia' (a depressed young woman) in Campamento Albanta, a 2020 mystery drama series shot in Peguerinos about a rehabilitation camp for people suffering from problems of drug addiction, low self-esteem and bullying. Tell took part in the filming of the second season of Hierro in 2020, which was hampered by the COVID-19 lockdown.

Also in 2020, she released her first EP, titled 135, an indie-pop work featuring 6 songs. Prior to that, some of Kimberley Tell's songs had been already played in The Night Watchman and the TV series Elite (in the latter case, Lo que no me dices). She has also collaborated with David Bisbal in the videoclip Culpable and in Sidonie's video Me llamo Abba.

== Filmography ==
Television

Year	Title	Role	Notes	Ref.
2014	Velvet	Gracia de Mónaco	Guest role	
2015	Olmos y Robles	Preston		
2015	Algo que celebrar	Rose		
2016	Buscando el norte	Ulrike Ruiz		
2016	Ebre, del bressol a la batalla	Nan Green	TV movie	
2019	45 revoluciones (45 rpm)	Fanny		
2018–2021	Hierro	Pilar		
2020	Campamento Albanta	Olivia		
2024	Operación Barrio Inglés	Agatha	Main role	
2024-2025	Ena. Queen Victoria Eugenia	Victoria Eugenie of Battenberg		
2025	El centro	Marta Serra	Main role	
2025	Entrepeneurs	Gala Gardel		

Film

Year	Title	Role	Notes	Ref.
2016	La Mina (The Night Watchman)	Alma		
2020	Planeta 5000	Iris		
2025	Uno equis dos (One X Two)	Paula		
