= Campamento Albanta =

Spanish television series

- Genre: Supernatural thriller; Mystery; Horror
- Screenplay by: Nico Frasquet; Amanda Encinas
- Directed by: Alfredo López
- Starring: Kimberley Tell; Pol Monen; Lucía Martín; Eva Llorach; Pep Llopis; Javier Ruesga; Jorge Clemente
- Country of origin: Spain
- Original language: Spanish
- No. of seasons: 1
- No. of episodes: 6

Production
- Running time: 25 min (approx.)
- Production company: Lucky Road

Original release
- Network: Atresplayer Premium
- Release: 26 July – 9 August 2020

Campamento Albanta is a Spanish supernatural thriller streaming television series, starring Kimberley Tell, Pol Monen and Eva Llorach, among others. It was released in 2020 on Atresplayer Premium.

== Premise ==
The fiction, a medley of mystery, supernatural thriller, horror and science fiction, is set in a rehabilitation camp for young adults in the middle of the forest. The plot follows Olivia, who feigns a depression to enter the camp and thus discover the reasons for her brother's suicide soon after returning from a stay at the camp.

== Cast ==
- Kimberley Tell as Olivia, who feigns a depression to enter the camp.
- Pol Monen as Abel, suffers from a tendency to frustration.
- Lucía Martín as Carolina, incapable of taking anything seriously.
- Eva Llorach as Idalia, the founder of the camp.
- Pep Llopis as Dídac, camp instructor, Idalia's son.
- Javier Ruesga as Audrey, a non-binary character, who may know better than the rest of internees what is actually happening at the camp.
- Jorge Clemente as Marcos, the youngest intern at the camp.

== Production and release ==
Produced by Lucky Road, the writing team was formed by Nico Frasquet and Amanda Encinas whereas Alfredo López directed the 6 episodes, featuring a running time of around 25 minutes. The series was shot in the northern hemisphere Summer of 2019 in Peguerinos, Province of Ávila.

While nominally presented under the Flooxer brand, Atresmedia rather programmed an original release on Atresplayer Premium on a two episodes per week basis, premiering on 26 July 2020 on the latter platform.

Series	Episodes	Originally released			Ref.
Series	Episodes	First released	Last released	Network	Ref.
1	6	26 July 2020	9 August 2020	ATRESplayer Premium	

No.	Title	Original release date
1	"La montaña mágica"	26 July 2020
2	"Una mirada a la oscuridad"	26 July 2020
3	"La metamorfosis"	2 August 2020
4	"Los paraísos artificiales"	2 August 2020
5	"Confesiones de una"	9 August 2020
6	"El fin de la eternidad"	9 August 2020
