= La Moderna =

Spanish television soap opera

- Genre: Soap opera; Period drama
- Based on: Tea Rooms. Mujeres obreras by Luisa Carnés
- Starring: Helena Ezquerro; Almagro San Miguel; Stéphanie Magnin; Sara Rivero; Teresa Hurtado de Ory; Miryam Gallego; Berta Castañé; Rodrigo Simón; Cosette Silguero; Bàrbara Mestanza; Llorenç González; Carles Sanjaime; Lorea Carballo; Xabier Murua; Carlos Librado "Nene"; Andrea Fiorillo; María José Parra; Pablo Álvarez; Germán Alcarazu; José Luis García-Pérez
- Original language: Spanish
- No. of seasons: 3
- No. of episodes: 356

Production
- Production companies: RTVE; Mediawan; Boomerang TV

Original release
- Network: La 1
- Release: 27 September 2023 – 7 March 2025

Salón de té La Moderna or simply La Moderna is a Spanish period television soap opera. It premiered in Spain on 27 September 2023 on La 1 of Televisión Española, and it concluded on 7 March 2025, after three seasons and 356 episodes. It stars Helena Ezquerro, Almagro San Miguel, and Stéphanie Magnin, among others. It is inspired by the book Tea Rooms. Mujeres obreras by Luisa Carnés.

== Premise ==
Set in 1930 in Madrid, the series follows young Matilde, who enters to work at the tearoom "La Moderna" in Puerta del Sol. Matilde comes across old flame Íñigo, ambitioned by former girlfriend Doña Carla, the wife of Don Jaime, the businessman Íñigo works for.

== Cast ==
- Helena Ezquerro as Matilde
- Almagro San Miguel as Íñigo Peñalver
- Stéphanie Magnin as Carla de Morcuende
- Sara Rivero as Teresa
- Teresa Hurtado de Ory as Antonia
- Miryam Gallego as Rosario Martín
- Berta Castañé as Luisa Garcés
- Rodrigo Simón as Pablo Garcés
- Cosette Silguero as Clara Garcés
- Bàrbara Mestanza as Trini
- Llorenç González as Miguel
- Carles Sanjaime as Fermín Villanueva
- Lorea Carballo as Marta
- Xabier Murua as Elías
- Carlos Librado "Nene" as Francisco Cañete
- Andrea Fiorillo as Pietro
- María José Parra as Esperanza
- Pablo Álvarez as Raimundo
- Germán Alcarazu as Emilio
- José Luis García-Pérez as Jaime de Morcuende
- Berta Galo as Laurita
- Diana Palazón as Pepita
- Lola Marceli as Maruja
- Magdalena Tejado as Paula
- Jesús Mosquera as Rodrigo
- Miguel Hermoso as Emiliano Pedraza
- Pepe Nufrio as Iván
- Clara Alvarado as Mercedes
- Miguel Ángel Muñoz as César Morel

== Production ==
The series takes inspiration from Tea Rooms. Mujeres obreras by Generation of '27 author Luisa Carnés. It was produced by RTVE and Mediawan in collaboration with Boomerang TV. Helmed by Carlos Martín Eguía and Joaquín Santamaría, the writing team also featured Miquel Peidró, José Antonio López (Kata), Remedios Crespo, Ignasi Rubio, Juan Manuel Beiro, Ángela Armero, Neus Peidró, Sergio Barrejón, José Ángel Domínguez, and Laura Molpeceres.

== Episodes ==
Season	Episodes	Originally released		Avg. viewers (millions)	Avg. share
Season	Episodes	First released	Last released	Avg. viewers (millions)	Avg. share
1	120	27 September 2023	14 March 2024	0.750	8.2%
2	116	15 March 2024	20 September 2024	0.713	8.3%
3	120	23 September 2024	7 March 2025	0.799	9,4%

== Release ==
RTVE premiered the first two episodes in prime time on La 1, La 2, Clan, and RTVE Play on 27 September 2023, with regular sobremesa broadcast on La 1 beginning the following day.
