= A Commonplace =

- Film poster
- Spanish: Un lugar común
- Directed by: Celia Giraldo
- Screenplay by: Celia Giraldo; Bianca Franceza Omonte
- Produced by: Aintza Serra; Sergi Casamitjana; Nadine Rothschild
- Starring: Eva Llorach; Mia Sala-Patau; Felix Pons; Teo Soler; Jordina Sala; Marta Aguilar; Aina Clotet
- Cinematography: José Cachón
- Edited by: Javier Gil
- Music by: Jona Hamann
- Production companies: Escac Studio; Escándalo Films; Materia Cinema
- Distributed by: Alfa Pictures
- Release dates: 7 April 2024 (D'A); 14 August 2024 (Spain)
- Country: Spain
- Language: Spanish

A Commonplace (Spanish: Un lugar común) is a 2024 Spanish drama film directed by Celia Giraldo in her directorial full-length solo debut starring Eva Llorach.

== Plot ==
52-year-old Pilar is forced out of her job as a nurse in an early retirement. She enters an existential crisis after desperately clinging to the care of her family.

== Cast ==
- Eva Llorach as Pilar
- Mia Sala-Patau
- Felix Pons
- Teo Soler
- Jordina Sala
- Marta Aguilar
- Aina Clotet

== Production ==
The film was produced by Escac Studio, Escándalo Films, and Materia Cinema and it had the collaboration of TV3. It was shot in Catalonia.

== Release ==
The film was programmed to have its world premiere at the D'A Film Festival Barcelona on 7 April 2024. It also received a screening at the Atlàntida Mallorca Film Fest on 25 July 2024. It is scheduled to be released theatrically in Spain on 14 August 2024 by Alfa Pictures.

== Reception ==
Eulàlia Iglesias of Fotogramas rated A Commonplace—"a film celebrating the talent of Eva Llorach"—3 out of 5 stars, singling out the catharsis of the party scene as the best thing about the film, while negatively citing the somewhat predictable personal evolution of the protagonist.

Nuria Vidal of Cinemanía rated the film 4 out of 5 stars, declaring it "one of the most interesting debut films of the year".

== Accolades ==
Year	Award	Category	Nominee(s)	Result	Ref.
2025	17th Gaudí Awards	Best New Director	Celia Giraldo	Won	

== See also ==
- List of Spanish films of 2024
