= The Instinct (film) =

- Theatrical release poster
- Spanish: El instinto
- Directed by: Juan Albarracín
- Written by: Juan Albarracín
- Produced by: Juan Poveda; José Egea; Dany Campos; Iván Emery
- Starring: Javier Pereira; Fernando Cayo; Eva Llorach
- Cinematography: Iván Emery Arnáiz
- Edited by: Álvaro Delgado
- Music by: Pablo Serrano
- Production companies: Twin Freaks Studio; Horizon Media; Pópulos Films; Trilita Films
- Distributed by: Barton Films
- Release dates: 18 October 2024 (Abycine); 16 May 2025 (Spain)
- Country: Spain
- Language: Spanish

The Instinct (Spanish: El instinto) is a 2024 Spanish psychological thriller film written and directed by Juan Albarracín in his directorial debut feature. It stars Javier Pereira, Fernando Cayo, and Eva Llorach.

== Plot ==
After Sonia warns agoraphobic architect Abel that his career is imperiled, Abel accepts to receive an alternative treatment by dog trainer Jose.

== Cast ==
- Javier Pereira as Abel
- Fernando Cayo as José
- Eva Llorach as Sonia
- Rocío Bernal as Elisa
- Pepe Villena as padre de Abel ('Abel's father')
- Silvia Conesa as la madre ('the mother')
- Nicolás Edo as Abel (child)

== Production ==
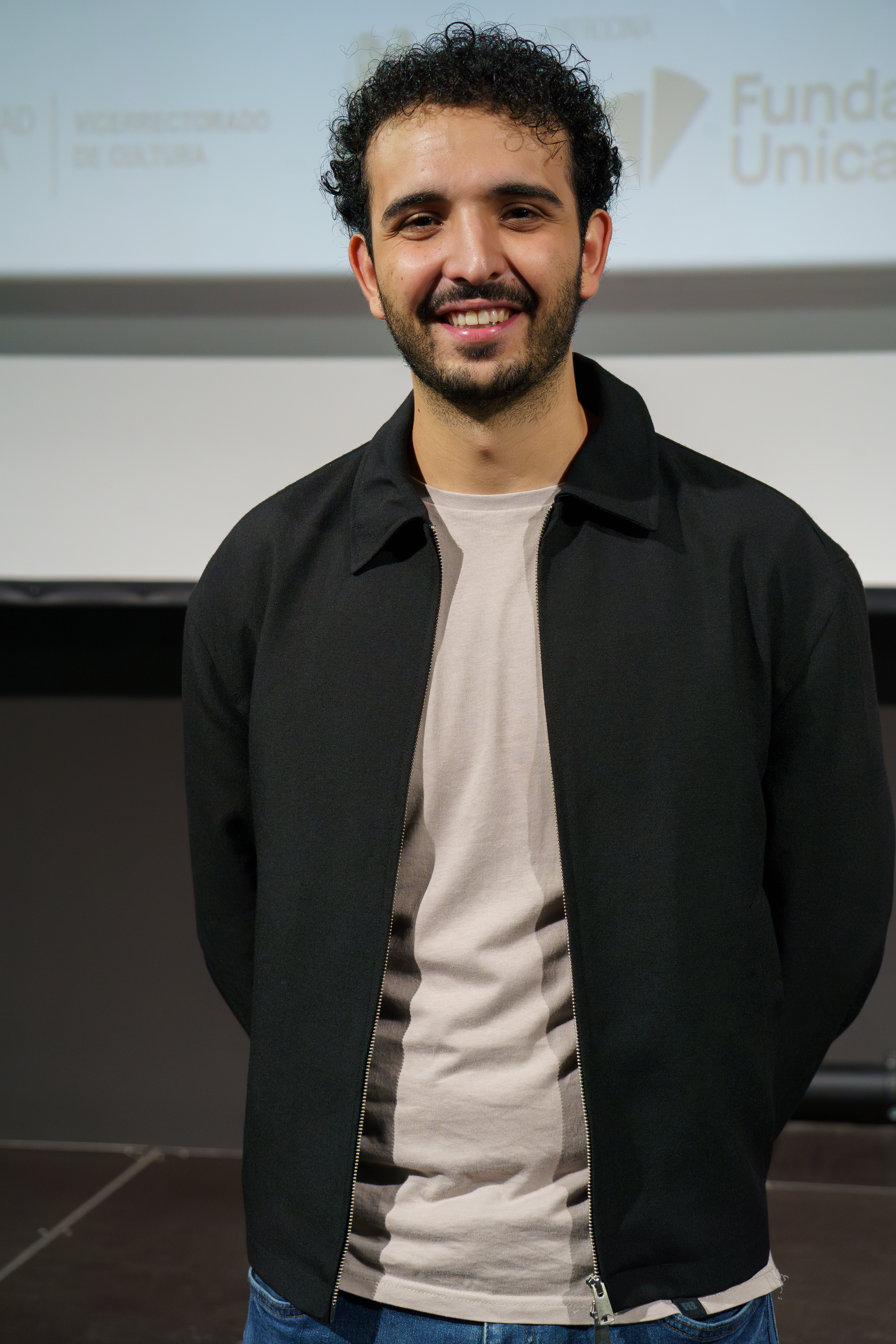
Juan Albarracín at the FANCINE Fantastic Film Festival of Málaga in November 2024

The Instinct was produced by Twin Freaks Studio, Horizon Media, Pópulos Films, and Trilita Films, and it had the participation of La 7. Shooting locations in the Region of Murcia included Molina de Segura, Bullas, La Hoya (Lorca) La Galera Beach (Águilas).

The film had a budget of around €398,000 and was partially financed by crowdfunding.

== Release ==
The film was slated to have its world premiere at the 26th Abycine Independent Film Festival in October 2024. It also made it to the slate of the Ramaskrik filmfestival, and the 22nd Alicante Film Festival. Distributed by Barton Films, it is expected to be released theatrically on 16 May 2025.

== Reception ==
Raquel Hernández Luján of HobbyConsolas gave the film 60 points ('acceptable'), deeming it to be a "dark and twisted minimalist single-location thriller".

Carmen L. Lobo of La Razón rated the film 3 out of 5 stars, declaring it "an unsettling, very disturbing debut featuring two fully committed actors".

== See also ==
- List of Spanish films of 2025
