= The Truthers =

- Promotional release poster
- Spanish: Los creyentes
- Directed by: Roger Gual
- Screenplay by: Carlos Montero; Darío Madrona
- Starring: Stéphanie Magnin; José Coronado
- Cinematography: Juana Jiménez
- Music by: Nico Casal
- Production company: El Desorden Crea
- Distributed by: Netflix
- Release date: 24 July 2026
- Country: Spain
- Language: Spanish

The Truthers (Spanish: Los creyentes) is a 2026 Spanish psychological thriller film directed by Roger Gual and written by Carlos Montero and Darío Madrona. It stars Stéphanie Magnin and José Coronado.

== Plot ==
The plot takes place in a town in northern Spain. After the death of her mother, Berlin-based DJ Ruth returns to her hometown and meets her estranged father, a grumpy man who has become a truther. Because of Martín's erratic behavior, Ruth begins to suspect that he is responsible for her mother's death.

== Cast ==
- José Coronado as Martín
- Stéphanie Magnin as Ruth
- Fanny Gautier as Lucía
- Alberto Olmo as Arón

== Production ==
The film is an El Desorden Crea production. It was filmed by Juana Jiménez and scored by Nico Casal. Shooting locations included Asturias, Berlin, and Madrid.

== Release ==
The films was released on Netflix on 24 July 2026.

== Reception ==
Javier Ocaña of El País deemed the film to be a "well-crafted product suitable for all audiences, whose greatest strength lies in the chosen theme".

Simon Abrams of RogerEbert.com rated the film 2 out of 4 stars, lamenting that "it does repeatedly deny viewers the formulaic pleasures that it promises".

== See also ==
- List of Spanish films of 2026
