= Olmos y Robles =

- Genre: Police procedural Comedy
- Created by: Carlos Martín; Jorge A. Lara
- Based on: An original idea by Flipy, David Troncoso and Rafa Parbús
- Starring: Pepe Viyuela; Rubén Cortada; Enrique Villén; Ana Morgade; Asunción Balaguer; Álex O'Dogherty; Pilar Castro; Luis Miguel Seguí; Santi Marín; Andrea Duro
- Country of origin: Spain
- Original language: Spanish
- No. of seasons: 2
- No. of episodes: 18

Production
- Running time: 60 minutes approx.
- Production company: 100 Balas

Original release
- Network: La 1
- Release: September 8, 2015 – November 21, 2016

Olmos y Robles (Olmos and Robles) is a Spanish police procedural comedy television series produced by 100 Balas for Televisión Española (TVE). It premiered on September 8, 2015, on TVE's main channel La 1. The series focuses on two civil guards of very different backgrounds who have to work together solving relevant crimes.

The series was renewed for a second season, but not for a third one.

== Plot ==
Olmos is a corporal of the Civil Guard's Public Order and Prevention service who works in the station of his birthplace, Ezcaray, a small peaceful town in La Rioja. Robles is a lieutenant of the Rapid Reaction Group, one of the most prestigious units of the Civil Guard, an urban and modern officer. They see themselves forced to work together if they want to solve the international case which, as luck would have it, has united them in this town in La Rioja, the serial murder of a group of mercenaries. They are polar opposites, but together they make up a great team.

In season 2, both guards have to work together in order to solve another important crime, which includes the death of Robles' parents, the assassination attempt of a Spanish high-ranked NATO politician and an international corruption plot related to an important arms trade enterprise.

== Production ==
Filming of the series began in July 2015. Indoor scenes were filmed in studio in Madrid. Outdoor scenes were filmed on location in Ezcaray and other locations in La Rioja: Logroño, Haro, San Millán de la Cogolla, Nájera and Zaldierna.

== Cast and characters ==
The following is the cast of the series:

=== Main characters ===
- Pepe Viyuela as Cp. Sebastián Olmos
- Rubén Cortada as Lt. Agustín Robles
- Enrique Villén as agent Gregorio Atiza
- Ana Morgade as Catalina "Cata"
- Asunción Balaguer as Doña Domitilla "Domi" (Olmos' grandmother)
- Álex O'Dogherty as Damián Navarro, the mayor of Ezcaray
- Pilar Castro as Isabel "Isa" Antúnez
- Luis Miguel Seguí as César Alcides
- Santi Marín as Lucas "Lucky" Mellado
- Andrea Duro as Nuria Atiza

=== Recurring characters ===
- Antonio Tato as Claudio
- Ricardo Lacámara as Braulio
- Sara Sálamo as Doctora Aguilar
- Kimberley Tell as Preston

== Episodes ==
=== Season 1 ===
No. overall	No. in season	Title	Directed by	Original release date	Viewers (millions)	Share
1	1	"La venganza de los siete infantes de Lara"	Carlos Theron	September 8, 2015	3.309	19.5%
2	2	"En barrica no siempre envejece mejor"	Juanma Pachón	September 15, 2015	3.332	18.8%
3	3	"El misterio de Sor Trinidad"	Antonio Recio	September 22, 2015	2.625	14%
4	4	"En tumba cerrada no entran moscas"	Juan González	September 29, 2015	2.492	13.4%
5	5	"La venganza de Emiliano Pozuelo"	Juanma Pachón	October 6, 2015	2.441	12.7%
6	6	"El negro augurio del cuervo blanco"	Rafa Parbús	October 13, 2015	2.309	12%
7	7	"El juego de Almanzor"	Antonio Recio	October 20, 2015	2.398	12.6%
8	8	"Solos ante el peligro"	Carlos Theron	October 27, 2015	2.403	12.8%

=== Season 2 ===
No. overall	No. in season	Title	Directed by	Original release date	Viewers (millions)	Share
9	1	"Las dos caras de Ezcaray"	Juanma Pachón	September 12, 2016	1.660	10.2%
10	2	"Los asesinatos del Murder Club"	Antonio Recio	September 19, 2016	1.651	9.5%
11	3	"El misterio del bosque tenebroso"	Javier Roldán	September 26, 2016	2.095	12.2%
12	4	"Único testigo"	Rafa Parbús	October 3, 2016	1.920	10.8%
13	5	"El asesino de la taquillaparte 1)"	Juanma Pachón	October 10, 2016	1.861	10.6%
14	6	"El asesino de la taquillaparte 2)"	Antonio Recio	October 17, 2016	2.000	11%
15	7	"Expediente X-ezcaray"	Rafa Parbús	October 24, 2016	1.812	10.1%
16	8	"Tras el Corazón Verde"	David Molina	November 7, 2016	1.862	10.6%
17	9	"Secuestro de un delantero"	Juanma Pachón	November 14, 2016	1.837	10.2%
18	10	"Fin del camino"	Antonio Recio	November 21, 2016	1.921	11.2%
