= Saturn Return (2024 film) =

- Spanish theatrical release poster
- Spanish: Segundo premio
- Directed by: Isaki Lacuesta; Pol Rodríguez
- Screenplay by: Isaki Lacuesta; Fernando Navarro
- Produced by: Cristóbal García
- Starring: Daniel Ibáñez; Cristalino; Stéphanie Magnin; Mafo; Chesco Ruiz; Edu Rejón
- Cinematography: Takuro Takeuchi
- Edited by: Javi Frutos
- Music by: Ylia
- Production companies: La Terraza Films; Áralan Films; Ikiru Films; BTeam Prods; Sideral Cinema; Capricci; Los Ilusos Films; Toxicosmos AIE
- Distributed by: BTeam Pictures (Spain); Capricci Films (France)
- Release dates: 5 March 2024 (Málaga); 24 May 2024 (Spain); 12 July 2025 (France)
- Running time: 109 minutes
- Countries: Spain; France
- Language: Spanish

Saturn Return (Spanish: Segundo premio) is a 2024 musical drama film directed by Isaki Lacuesta and Pol Rodríguez starring Daniel Ibáñez, Stéphanie Magnin, and Cristalino. Set in the late 1990s against the backdrop of Granada's musical scene, the plot fictionalizes the creative process behind Los Planetas' third album.

The film premiered on 5 March 2024, in competition at the 27th Málaga Film Festival, where it won the Golden Biznaga, ahead of its Spanish theatrical release on 24 May 2024 by BTeam Pictures. It was released theatrically in France on 16 July 2025 by Capricci Films. It won three Goya Awards (Best Director, Editing, and Sound). It was also selected as the Spanish submission for the Academy Award for Best International Feature Film.

== Plot ==
Granada. 20th century. A man and a woman walk away from a ski slope. The man (the singer) recriminates the woman (May) about her decision to leave [the band] (Los Planetas). The woman recalls that was not the way things happened, and proceeds to narrate her version, the version of a bassist who performed live with her back to the audience and the member who left the musical act. According to her, at 27 years old, when the other members wanted to release an album, the woman simply wanted to depart.

The band's guitarist plays some guitar chords to the singer. The films depicts the singer and the guitarist awkwardly performing at a television show along with pre-recorded music, the guitarist's struggles with substance abuse, the singer and the guitarist asking a reluctant record company in Madrid to record their third album in New York City, the singer and the guitarist search for a drummer and a bassist, managing to recruit the former, who divagates about what makes Granada special about its musical scene. The plot depicts the guitarist's hallucinations and fantasies after a gig, a casual meeting of the guitarist with May, who has started a university degree, and a guitarist's mishap that lands him in hospital, with his hands bandaged. While having a full lineup, the band struggles to meet their creative deadlines with the label, and the guitarist tells the singer that May did not leave because of the accident stuff. The singer meets with a defiant May at the university and they later talk and smoke on a terrace. After attending the same procession, the drummer and the guitarist meet and question's about the singer's NYC plans. The guitarist experiences hallucinations with NYC.

The guitarist proposes to the singer and the drummer to seclude themselves to meet their creative deadlines with the album. The group showcases their advances to the music label executives. The singer is pushed to continue working on a hit song and suggested to leave the guitarist behind should they travel to NYC to record the album. The singer phones May to talk about the band's advances and fails to convince her into rejoining the band.

The singer finally travels to NYC without the guitarist, who was taken to Madrid by Santa to undergo some rehab. The memory of the guitarist haunts the singer, who phones the guitarist and proposes him to rejoin the band in NYC. The guitarist and the singer meet again there and the band records the third album, Una semana en el motor de un autobús. May receives a compact disc copy of the album.

== Cast ==
- Daniel Ibáñez as the singer
- Stéphanie Magnin as May, the bassist
- Cristalino as the guitarist
- Mario Fernández "Mafo"
- Javier "Chesco" Ruiz

== Production ==
Saturn Return was originally set to be directed by Jonás Trueba, but Trueba eventually left the project for undisclosed reasons and Isaki Lacuesta took over, while Fernando Navarro remained in writing duties. The film is Spanish-French co-production by La Terraza Films, Áralan Films, Ikiru Films, Capricci Films, Bteam Prods., Sidereal Cinema, Los Ilusos Films, and Toxicosmos AIE production.

In April 2023, days before the start of production, Lacuesta's and Isa Campo's daughter Luna became ill, and so Lacuesta directed the film remotely from the hospital, with the on-site collaboration of assistant director Pol Rodríguez. The film is dedicated to Luna, who died from leukemia before the film's premiere.

Shooting locations in Granada included the Campo del Príncipe. The film was additionally shot in Seville, Madrid, and New York.

== Release ==
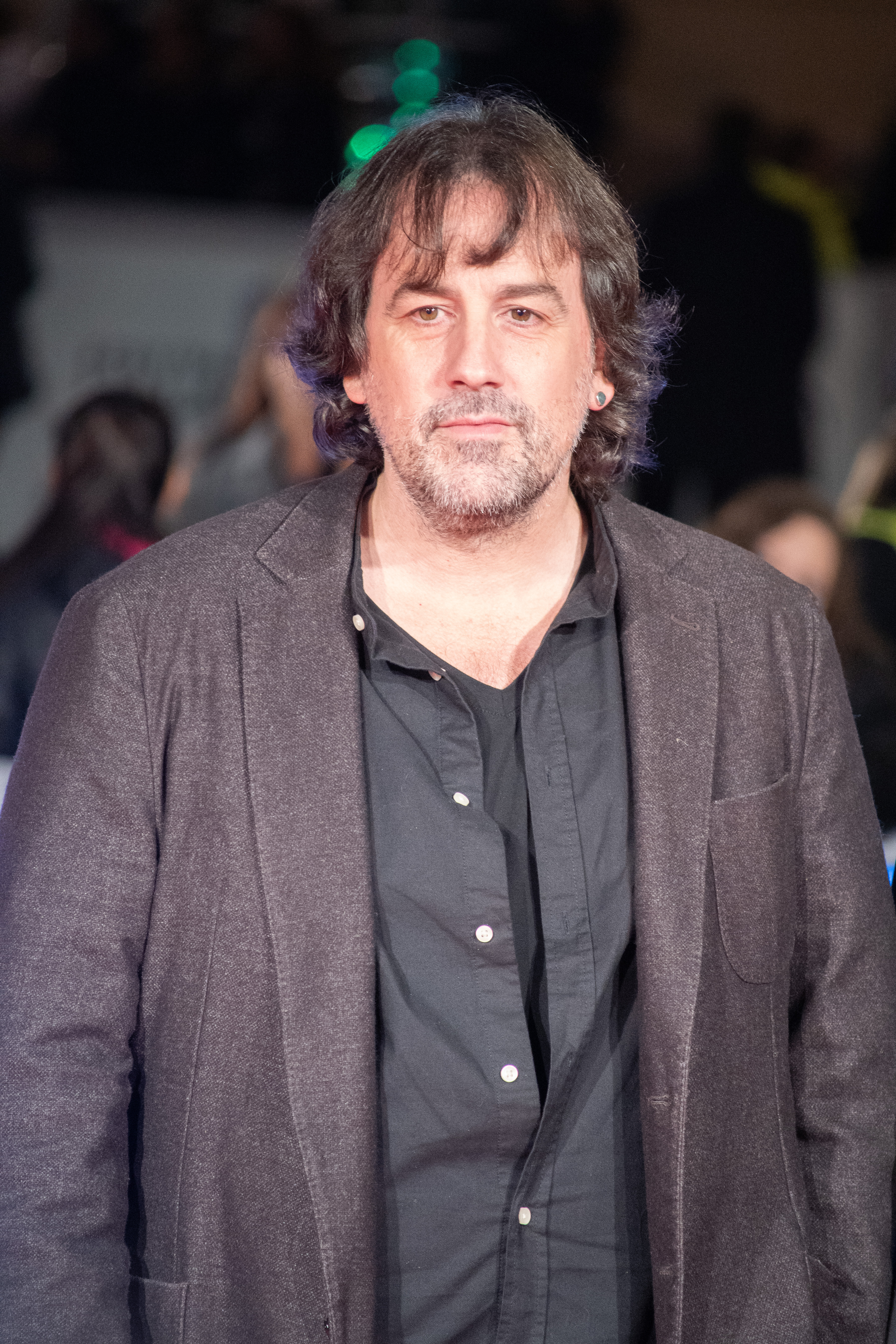
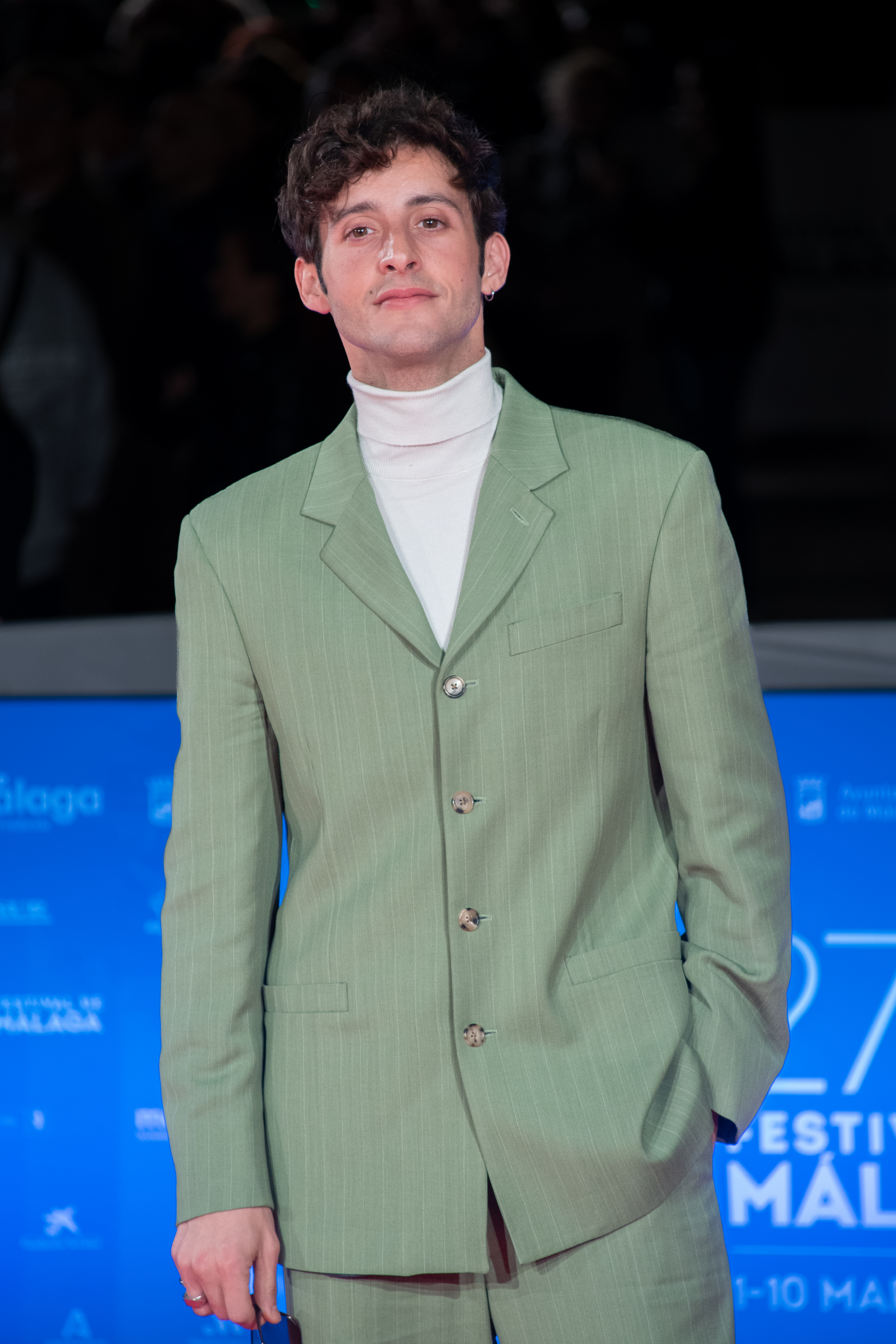
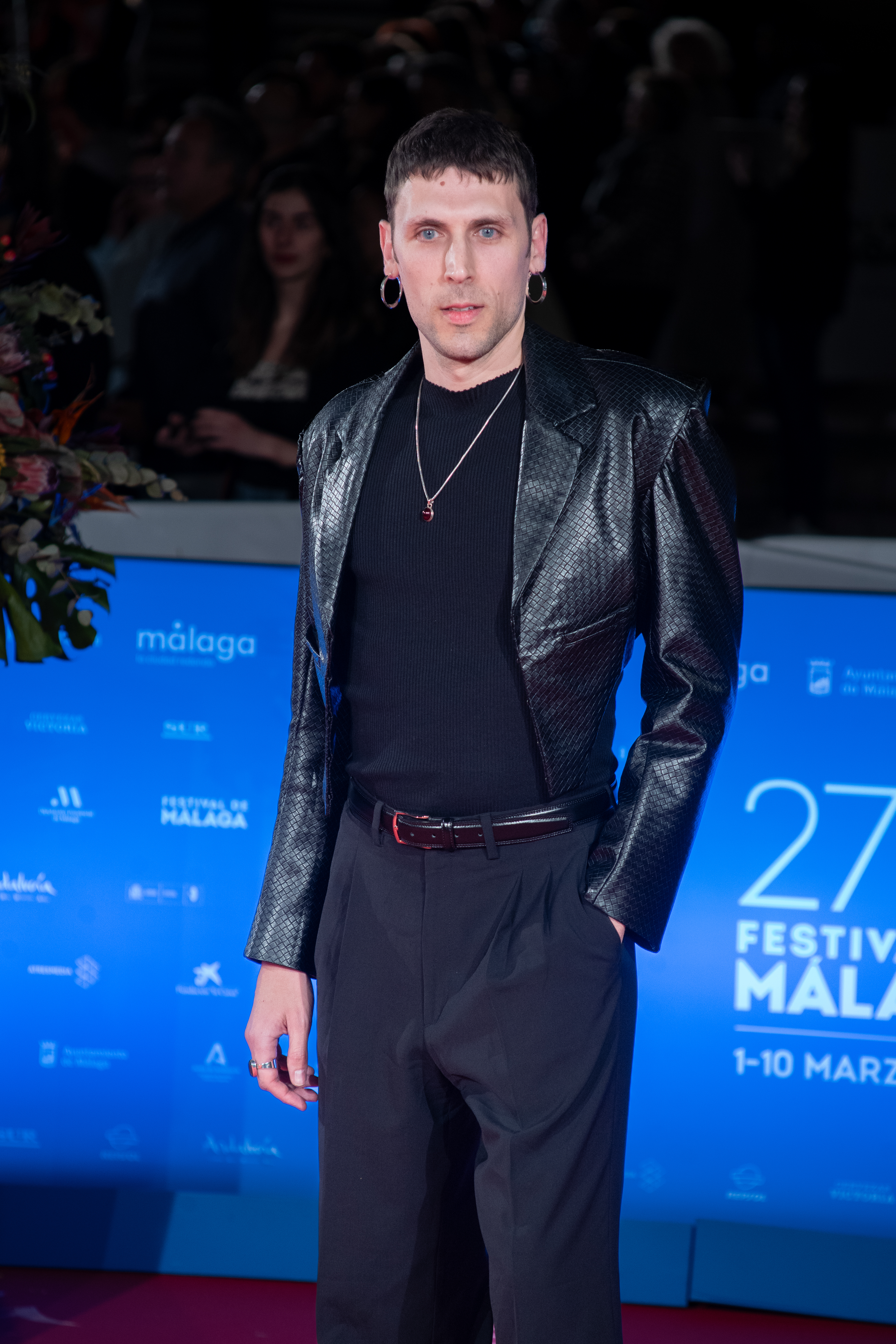
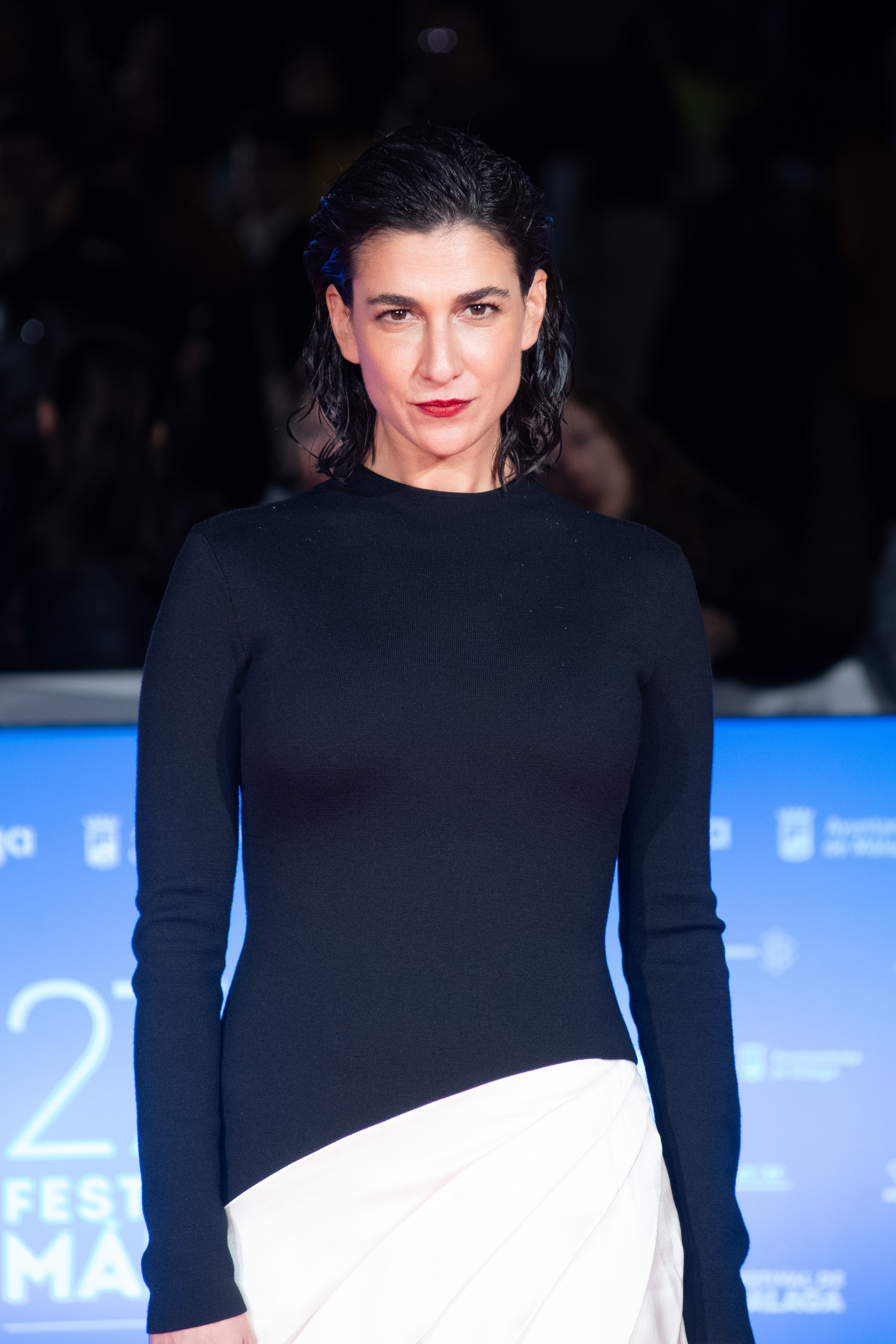
Director Isaki Lacuesta and cast members Daniel Ibáñez, Cristalino, and Stéphanie Magnin attending the 2024 Málaga Film Festival

Film distribution was handled by BTeam Pictures in Spain and Capricci Films in France. Latido Films acquired international sales rights.

For its world premiere, the film was presented at the 27th Málaga Film Festival on 5 March 2024. It was also selected for screenings at the 14th D'A Film Festival Barcelona, the 25th Buenos Aires International Festival of Independent Cinema (BAFICI), the 39th Guadalajara International Film Festival (Ibero-American Fiction Feature Film selection), and the Seattle Film Festival. It was released theatrically in Spain on 24 May 2024. Outsider Pictures acquired North-American rights to the film. Distributed by Capricci Films, it opened in French theatres on 16 July 2025.

== Reception ==
=== Critical response ===
On the review aggregator website Rotten Tomatoes, 85% of 13 critics' reviews are positive, with an average rating of 8.3/10.

Jonathan Holland of ScreenDaily deemed the film to be something both "very watchable and artistically satisfying".

Andrea G. Bermejo of Cinemanía rated the film 5 out of 5 stars and praised the work of the cast, both the musicians who had never acted before and the actors who never had had a Granadan accent.

Raúl Julián of Mondo Sonoro gave the film an 8 out of 10 score, writing about "100 minutes of focus and approach far removed from conventionalisms and well maintained by the filmmakers, as well as supported by actors in a state of grace".

Eulàlia Iglesias of Ara rated the film 4½ out of 5 stars, pointing out that a number of features in the film "move the proposal away from the prosaic routines of musical biopics with an exhaustive, mimetic and Wikipedist vocation".

Sergi Sánchez of La Razón rated the film 5 out of 5 stars, considering it one of "the most exciting films about friendship and artistic creation that recent Spanish cinema has produced".

Marta Medina of El Confidencial rated the film 4 out of 5 stars, considering it "one of the most suggestive films of the year".

Carlos Aguilar of Variety found the film to be one of the "most honest and reinvigorating music biopics in years".

In September 2024, the Academy of Cinematographic Arts and Sciences of Spain selected Saturn Return for a shortlist of 3 films to determine their final submission for Best International Feature Film at the 97th Academy Awards, eventually becoming Spain's submission to the aforementioned award.

=== Listicles ===
The film appeared on a number of critics' lists of top Spanish films of 2024:

- 1st — El Periódico de Catalunya (critics and journalists)
- 1st — El Cultural
- 2nd — Cadena SER (consensus)
- 2nd — Cadena SER (José M. Romero)
- 2nd — El Mundo (Luis Martínez)
- 3rd — Cadena SER (Elio Castro)
- 5th — Cadena SER (Pepa Blanes)

=== Accolades ===
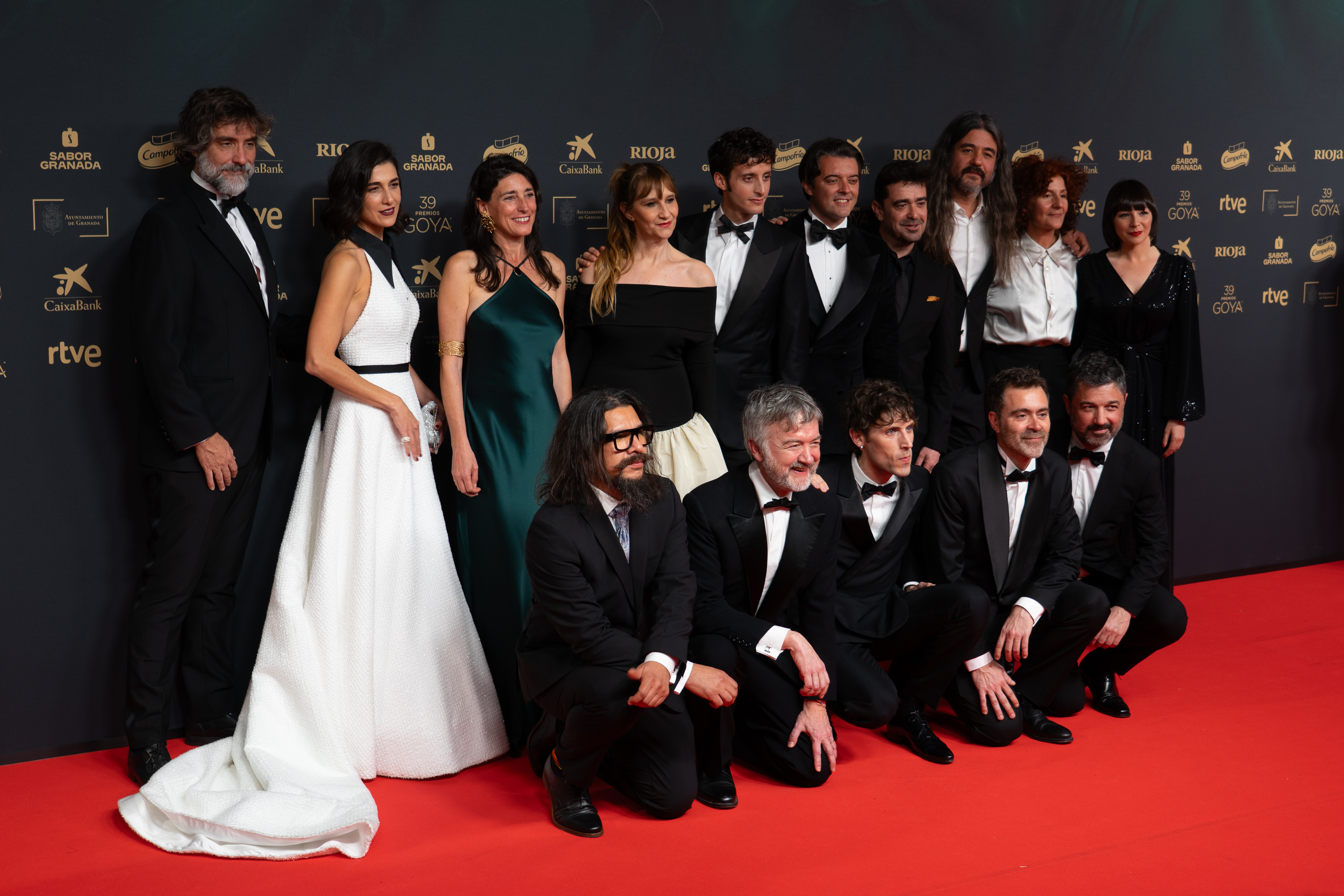
Crew and cast members attending the 39th Goya Awards in February 2025

Year	Award	Category	Nominee(s)	Result	Ref.
2024	27th Málaga Film Festival	Golden Biznaga for Best Spanish Film		Won	
2024	27th Málaga Film Festival	Best Director	Isaki Lacuesta, Pol Rodríguez	Won	
2024	27th Málaga Film Festival	Best Editing	Javi Frutos	Won	
2024	30th Forqué Awards	Best Film		Nominated	
2025	17th Gaudí Awards	Best Non-Catalan Language Film		Nominated	
2025	17th Gaudí Awards	Best Director	Isaki Lacuesta, Pol Rodríguez	Won	
2025	17th Gaudí Awards	Best Original Screenplay	Isaki Lacuesta, Fernando Navarro	Nominated	
2025	17th Gaudí Awards	Best Production Supervision	Carlos Amoedo	Nominated	
2025	17th Gaudí Awards	Best Cinematography	Takuro Takeuchi	Won	
2025	17th Gaudí Awards	Best Costume Design	Lourdes Fuentes	Nominated	
2025	17th Gaudí Awards	Best Makeup and Hairstyles	Yolanda Piña, Inés Díaz	Nominated	
2025	17th Gaudí Awards	Best Sound	Diana Sagrista, Alejandro Castillo, Eva Valiño, Antonin Dalmasso	Won	
2025	17th Gaudí Awards	Best Visual Effects	María Magnet, Marion Delgado, Iñaki Gil "Ketxu", Sebastien Launay	Nominated	
2025	4th Carmen Awards	Best Film		Won	
2025	4th Carmen Awards	Best Original Screenplay	Fernando Navarro	Won	
2025	4th Carmen Awards	Best New Actor	Cristalino	Won	
2025	4th Carmen Awards	Best Costume Design	Lourdes Fuentes	Won	
2025	4th Carmen Awards	Best Editing	Javier Frutos	Won	
2025	4th Carmen Awards	Best Sound	Diana Sagrista	Nominated	
2025	4th Carmen Awards	Best Art Direction	Pepe Domínguez, Gigia Pellegrini	Won	
2025	4th Carmen Awards	Best Makeup and Hairstyles	Yolanda Piña	Won	
2025	4th Carmen Awards	Best Special Effects	María Magnet, Marian Delgado	Won	
2025	39th Goya Awards	Best Film		Nominated	
2025	39th Goya Awards	Best Director	Isaki Lacuesta, Pol Rodríguez	Won	
2025	39th Goya Awards	Best New Actor	Cristalino	Nominated	
2025	39th Goya Awards	Best New Actor	Daniel Ibáñez	Nominated	
2025	39th Goya Awards	Best Cinematography	Takuro Takeuchi	Nominated	
2025	39th Goya Awards	Best Editing	Javi Frutos	Won	
2025	39th Goya Awards	Best Original Song	"Love Is the Worst" by Alondra Bentley, Isaki Lacuesta	Nominated	
2025	39th Goya Awards	Best Art Direction	Pepe Domínguez del Olmo	Nominated	
2025	39th Goya Awards	Best Costume Design	Lourdes Fuentes	Nominated	
2025	39th Goya Awards	Best Sound	Diana Sagrista, Eva Valiño, Alejandro Castillo, Antonin Dalmasso	Won	
2025	39th Goya Awards	Best Production Supervision	Carlos Amoedo	Nominated	
2025	33rd Actors and Actresses Union Awards	Best Film Actor in a Leading Role	Daniel Ibáñez	Nominated	
2025	33rd Actors and Actresses Union Awards	Best New Actor	Cristalino	Nominated	
2025	12th Platino Awards	Best Sound	Diana Sagrista, Alejandro Castillo, Eva Valiño, Antonin Dalmasso	Won	

== See also ==
- List of Spanish films of 2024
- List of submissions to the 97th Academy Awards for Best International Feature Film
- List of Spanish submissions for the Academy Award for Best International Feature Film
