= Everything I Don't Know =

- Theatrical release poster
- Spanish: Todo lo que no sé
- Directed by: Ana Lambarri Tellaeche
- Written by: Ana Lambarri Tellaeche
- Produced by: Yadira Ávalos; David Torres Vázquez; Carlos Guerrero
- Starring: Susana Abaitua; Francesco Carril; Natalia Huarte; Ane Gabarain; Stéphanie Magnin; Andrés Lima; Iñaki Ardanaz; Fran Cantos; Mark Schardan
- Cinematography: Carlos de Miguel
- Edited by: Juan Manuel Gamazo
- Music by: Alberto Torres
- Production companies: Naif Films; The Other Film; 39 Escalones Films; Robot Films
- Distributed by: 39 Escalones Films
- Release dates: 19 March 2025 (Málaga); 25 April 2025 (Spain)
- Country: Spain
- Language: Spanish

Everything I Don't Know (Spanish: Todo lo que no sé) is a 2025 Spanish drama film written and directed by Ana Lambarri Tellaeche (in her directorial debut feature) starring Susana Abaitua.

== Plot ==
After funds for her tech project are removed, thirtysomething computer engineer Laura starts working as a cashier in a Fnac retail store. As she is eventually given the chance to resume her project, she decides to prioritize herself.

== Cast ==
- Susana Abaitua as Laura
- Francesco Carril as Javi
- Natalia Huarte as Irati
- Ane Gabarain as madre de Laura ('Laura's mother')
- Stéphanie Magnin as Susana
- Andrés Lima as Martín
- Iñaki Ardanaz as Xabier
- Fran Cantos as Julián
- Mark Schardan as Matthew

== Production ==
The film is a Yadira Ávalos (Naif Films), Carlos Guerrero (39 Escalones), and David Torres Vázquez (The Other Film Production) co-production along with Robot Films, with the participation of RTVE and Movistar Plus+ and funding from the Madrid regional administration and ICAA. Shooting locations included Madrid. The poster art was designed by Octavio Terol.

== Release ==
Everything I Don't Know was presented at the 28th Málaga Film Festival on 19 March 2025. Distributed by 39 Escalones Films, that also handled international sales, the film is scheduled to be released theatrically in Spain on 25 April 2025.

== Reception ==
Víctor A. Gómez of La Opinión de Málaga described Everything I Don't Know as an "inoperative" feature film, "which circles around itself without getting anywhere beyond emotional puerility and expressive poverty".

Javier Ocaña of El País deemed the film to be a "meritory" debut, assessing that Lambarri avoids the usual mistake in Spanish cinema of sticking "to a skeletal script with a single conflict", while pointing out that "due to the mise-en-scène, more functional than creative" [the film] "looks more faded and dull than it should".

Paula Arantzazu Ruiz of Cinemanía rated the film 2½ out of 5 stars, lamenting that it is "too absorbed in the conflict".

== See also ==
- List of Spanish films of 2025
