= Ena. Queen Victoria Eugenia =

Spanish television series

- Spanish: Ena. La reina Victoria Eugenia
- Genre: Biographical; Period drama
- Created by: Javier Olivares
- Based on: Ena by Pilar Eyre
- Written by: Javier Olivares; Isa Sánchez; Daniel Corpas; Pablo Lara Toledo
- Directed by: Anaïs Pareto; Estel Díaz
- Starring: Kimberley Tell
- Music by: Bronquio
- Country of origin: Spain
- Original languages: Spanish; English; Catalan

Production
- Executive producers: Juan López Olivar; Nieves Fernández Blanco; Blanco Gerardo Iracheta; Luis Hernández; Rosa Díaz; Javier Olivares; Juan Navarrete
- Production companies: RTVE; La Cometa TV

Original release
- Network: Yle Areena
- Release: April 2025
- Network: La 1 RTVE Play
- Release: 24 November 2025

Ena. Queen Victoria Eugenia (Spanish: Ena. La reina Victoria Eugenia) is a Spanish period drama miniseries created by Javier Olivares based on a novel by Pilar Eyre starring Kimberley Tell as Victoria Eugenie of Battenberg.

== Plot ==
The plot tracks the life of queen consort Victoria Eugenie of Battenberg, who never managed to integrate in Spain, and suffered from a painful marriage to adulterous King Alfonso XIII and scorn because of her blood condition (carrier of hemophilia).

== Cast ==
- Kimberley Tell as Victoria Eugenia
- Joan Amargós as Alfonso XIII
- Elvira Mínguez as María Cristina
- Lucía Guerrero as Beatriz de Sajonia
- Raúl Mérida as Alfonso de Orleans
- Juan Gea as Conde de Romanones
- María Morales as Duquesa de la Victoria
- Pedro Mari Sánchez as Marqués de Villalobar
- Luisa Gavasa as Eugenia de Montijo
- Joaquín Notario as Marqués de Viana
- Mariano Peña as Miguel Primo de Rivera
- Jaume Madaula as Mateo Morral
- Tomás del Estal as Torres Mendoza
- Ángel Ruiz as Federico García Lorca

== Production ==
The series was produced by RTVE in collaboration with La Cometa TV.

== Release ==
The series received a pre-screening at the MIPCOM trade show in October 2024. It debuted on the Finnish public broadcaster Yle Areena in April 2025, and on Portuguese public broadcasters RTP2 and RTP Play in May 2025. RTVE's protractedly delayed release of the series in its home market angered the creator Javier Olivares, who ranted if the series was going to premiere in Ganymede before doing it in Spain.

== Accolades ==
Year	Award	Category	Nominee(s)	Result	Ref.
2026	34th Actors and Actresses Union Awards	Best Television Actress in a Minor Role	Natalia Huarte	Won	

== See also ==
- 2025 in Spanish television
