= One X Two =

- Theatrical release poster
- Spanish: Uno equis dos
- Directed by: Alberto Utrera
- Written by: Alberto Utrera; Carlos Soria
- Starring: Paco León; Raúl Tejón; Stéphanie Magnin; Adam Jezierski; Kimberley Tell
- Cinematography: Miguel Ángel García Rosado
- Edited by: Alberto Utrera
- Music by: Fede Pájaro
- Production company: Garajonay Producciones
- Distributed by: Raabta Pictures
- Release dates: 15 March 2025 (Málaga); 8 August 2025 (Spain)
- Country: Spain
- Language: Spanish

One X Two (Spanish: Uno equis dos) is a 2025 Spanish black comedy thriller film directed by Alberto Utrera. It stars Paco León, Raúl Tejón, Stéphanie Magnin, Adam Jezierski, and Kimberley Tell.

== Plot ==
After playing the quiniela football betting game together for years since they were in university, Chino and Josu, move to a mountain house with their partners Paula and Cris and Cris' divorced work colleague David for the weekend as they have matched the first 12 of the 15 results of the weekly quiniela. The situation escalates as they face the possibility of becoming rich.

== Cast ==
- Paco León as Chino
- Raúl Tejón as Josu
- Stéphanie Magnin as Cris
- Adam Jezierski
- Kimberley Tell as Paula

== Production ==
One X Two is a Garajonay Producciones production, and it had the association of Buendía Estudios. The film was shot in the 'Karibu Lodge' estate in Vega de San Mateo, Gran Canaria, in July and August 2024. Additional shooting locations in the island of Gran Canaria also included Playa de Las Canteras and Puerto de Mogán.

== Release ==
The film premiered in a non-competitive official selection slot of the 28th Málaga Film Festival on 15 March 2025. It is scheduled to be released theatrically in Spain on 8 August 2025 by Raabta Pictures.

== Reception ==
Javier Ocaña of El País assessed that Utrera's filmography echoes 1990s cinema, finding similarities in the film with Shallow Grave (1994).

Meanwhile, Alfonso Rivera of Cineuropa wrote that the film recalls Carnage, The Hateful Eight, and Perfect Strangers.

== See also ==
- List of Spanish films of 2025
