= 45 rpm (TV series) =

Spanish-language television series

- Spanish: 45 revoluciones
- Genre: Drama
- Created by: Ramón Campos; Gema R. Neira
- Directed by: David Pinillos; Gustavo Ron
- Starring: Carlos Cuevas; Guiomar Puerta; Iván Marcos
- Country of origin: Spain
- Original language: Spanish
- No. of seasons: 1
- No. of episodes: 13

Production
- Executive producers: Ramón Campos; Teresa Fernández-Valdés; Sonia Martínez
- Cinematography: Alfonso Postigo; Daniel Sosa Segura; Miguel P. Gilaberte
- Running time: 50 minutes
- Production companies: Atresmedia; Bambú Producciones

Original release
- Network: Antena 3
- Release: March 18 – May 30, 2019

45 rpm (Spanish: 45 revoluciones) is a 2019 Spanish drama television series created by Ramón Campos and Gema R. Neira that originally aired on Antena 3 from March 18 to May 30, 2019. Starring Carlos Cuevas, Guiomar Puerta and Iván Marcos, the plot revolves around the establishment of a music label in the 1960s and the people involved inside the complex music industry.

== Cast ==
- Carlos Cuevas as Robert Aguirre
- Guiomar Puerta as Maribel Campoy
- Iván Marcos as Guillermo Rojas
- Israel Elejalde as Pedro Zabala
- Luis Larrodera as Tino
- Diana Gómez as Clara Aguirre
- Silvana Navas as Nines
- Eudald Font as Diego Salinas
- Carmen Gutiérrez as Elisa
- Vito Sanz as Ignacio Betancourt
- Pau Vinyals as Chimo
- Pere Ponce as Alberto
- Héctor Black as Paco
- Marina San José as Ángeles Costa
- Joan Pera as D. Alfredo
- Kimberley Tell as Fanny
- Joseba Apaolaza as Eugenio Vidal
- Guim Puig as Juan
- Esmeralda Moya as Celia Vera
- Fanny Gautier as Feli
- Héctor Colorado as Jorge Rojas
- Nikola Zalduegui as Gary
- José Luis Hijón as Santi
- Nieve de Medina as Silvia
- Juanma Cifuentes as Salvador Quintana
- Amaia Aberasturi as Carmen
- Edgar Moreno as Valentín Quesada
- Javier Ibarz as a doctor

== Episodes ==
No.	Title	Directed by	Written by	Original release date	Spain viewers (millions)
1	"Futura" (Futura)	David Pinillos	Ramón Campos, Gema R. Neira, Paula Fernández, Javier Chacártegui, Salvador S. Molina, David Orea	March 18, 2019	1.53
Disgraced music executive Guillermo Rojas discovers talented singer Robert and teams up with his assistant Maribel Campoy to launch Futura, an imprint of Golden Records which will focus on the modern music trends.
2	"The License" (El carnet)	David Pinillos	Campos, Neira, Fernández, Chacártegui, Molina, Orea	March 25, 2019	1.10
Robert auditions for a license to perform professionally, but Guillermo's past gets in the way. Maribel learns Robert's best kept secret.
3	"The Single" (El sencillo)	Gustavo Ron	Campos, Neira, Fernández, Chacártegui, Molina, Orea	April 1, 2019	0.81
Guillermo struggles to find a studio to record Robert's debut single. Maribel comes up with an unorthodox solution.
4	"The Campaign" (La promoción)	Gustavo Ron	Campos, Neira, Fernández, Chacártegui, Curro Serrano, D. C. Torallas	April 8, 2019	0.73
Maribel and Robert's connection becomes deeper just as his career begins to take off. Meanwhile, some of Guillermo's past mistakes come back to haunt him.
5	"The Album" (El álbum)	David Pinillos	Campos, Neira, Fernández, Chacártegui, Serrano, Torallas	April 15, 2019	0.62
The Futura team faces a series of challenges as they try to record Robert's debut album, and Maribel faces sexism at work and lies at home.
6	"The Concert" (El concierto)	David Pinillos	Campos, Neira, Fernández, Chacártegui, Serrano, Orea, Molina	April 22, 2019	0.60
Maribel takes the helm in helping prepare Robert's concert at the iconic Circo Price, but an unexpected lawsuit involving songwriter Ignacio Betancourt spells trouble, not just for Robert, but for all of Golden Records.
7	"The Movie" (La película)	Gustavo Ron	Campos, Neira, Fernández, Chacártegui, Serrano, Moisés Gómez Ramos	April 29, 2019	0.62
Robert is cast in a movie opposite film star Fanny. Meanwhile, Maribel awaits medical results.
8	"The Tour" (La gira)	Gustavo Ron	Campos, Neira, Fernández, Chacártegui, Serrano, Gómez Ramos	May 9, 2019	0.47
The new majority shareholder of Golden Records tells Robert, who is getting ready to head off on a nationwide tour, to fake a relationship with Fanny to help promote the movie.
9	"The Premiere" (El estreno)	David Pinillos	Campos, Neira, Fernández, Chacártegui, Serrano, Gómez Ramos	May 16, 2019	0.43
Robert and Fanny are instructed to continue to lie about being in love, but the press catches wind of Robert's romance with Maribel.
10	"The Debut" (La puesta de largo)	David Pinillos	Campos, Neira, Fernández, Chacártegui, Serrano, Gómez Ramos	May 23, 2019	0.41
Ignacio is arrested, and his only hope to be released is Robert accepting to perform at a military party.
11	"The Offer" (La oferta)	Gustavo Ron	Campos, Neira, Fernández, Chacártegui, Serrano	May 23, 2019	0.19
The future of Golden Records is up in the air after a tragic death, leaving Guillermo and Zabala to scramble for money to save the company. Meanwhile, Robert receives a deal offer from Decca Records.
12	"The Competition" (El concurso)	Gustavo Ron	Campos, Neira, Fernández, Chacártegui, Serrano, Gómez Ramos	May 30, 2019	0.42
The government requests Robert take part in a singing competition to represent the Franco regime.
13	"The Last Song" (La última canción)	David Pinillos	Campos, Neira, Fernández, Chacártegui, Serrano	May 30, 2019	0.28
News of Robert's illness breaks, so Guillermo and Maribel organize a farewell concert for him. Meanwhile, Robert has a surprise of his own.

== Release ==
45 rpm premiered on March 18, 2019, on Antena 3. The original broadcasting run ended on May 30, 2019, in what it was one of the biggest blunders in the history of Spanish private television channels, with the series averaging a 4.3% audience share. It was released on Netflix on August 16, 2019 but later removed in May 2025.
