= Innate (TV series) =

Spanish television series

- Spanish: Innato
- Genre: Psychological thriller; Crime thriller
- Created by: Fran Carballal; Enrique Lojo
- Directed by: Lino Escalera; Inma Torrente
- Starring: Elena Anaya; Imanol Arias
- Countries of origin: Spain; United States
- Original language: Spanish

Production
- Executive producers: César Benítez; Emilio Amaré; Álvaro Benítez; Fran Carballal; Dan March; Carrie Stein
- Production companies: Plano a Plano Bilbao; Innato, La Serie AIE; Dynamic Television

Original release
- Network: Netflix
- Release: 23 December 2025

Innate (Spanish: Innato) is a psychological crime thriller television series created by Fran Carballal and Enrique Lojo. It stars Elena Anaya and Imanol Arias.

== Plot ==
After pulling through a traumatic childhood and remaking her life with a new identity, psychologist Sara sees her life upended upon the release from jail of her father Félix Garay, the serial murderer known as 'the Diesel Killer', as a new series of murders mirroring those from the past is unleashed.

== Cast ==
- Elena Anaya as Sara
- Imanol Arias as Félix Garay
- Emma Suárez as Arias
- Roberto Álamo as Aitor
- Teo Soler as Sebas
- Clara Sans as Lorena
- Ane Gabarain as Mercedes
- Mónica Solaun as Nagore
- Fernando Guallar as Jaime
- Natalia Huarte as Andrea

== Production ==
Innate was created by Fran Carballal and Enrique Lojo. The series was produced by Plano a Plano's Basque subsidiary Plano a Plano Bilbao and Innato, La Serie AIE alongside Dynamic Television. Shooting locations in Álava included the Vitoria-Gasteiz City Hall, Kuartango, the Miñano Tech Park, Maeztu, and Urturi.

== Release ==
Netflix acquired the rights for a Spanish streaming window, releasing the series on 23 December 2025. Hulu acquired U.S. rights to the series.

== Reception ==
Raquel Hernández Luján of HobbyConsolas gave the series a 73 point score, declaring it "very adictive" and "with great performances", particularly Anaya's and Arias'.

== See also ==
- 2025 in Spanish television
