= To the Max (film) =

- Film poster
- Spanish: La fiera
- Directed by: Salvador Calvo
- Screenplay by: Alejandro Hernández
- Produced by: Jaime Ortiz de Artiñano; Fernando Bovaira; Guillem Vidal-Folch
- Starring: Carlos Cuevas; Miguel Bernardeau; Miguel Ángel Silvestre; Candela González; Stéphanie Magnin; David Marcé; José Manuel Poga
- Cinematography: Ángel Iguácel
- Edited by: Jaime Colis
- Music by: Roque Baños
- Production companies: MOD Producciones; MOD Pictures; Atresmedia Cine
- Distributed by: Buena Vista International
- Release date: 6 February 2026
- Country: Spain
- Language: Spanish

To the Max (Spanish: La fiera) is a 2026 Spanish drama film directed by Salvador Calvo and written by Alejandro Hernández. Tackling BASE jumping, it stars Carlos Cuevas, Miguel Bernardeau, and Miguel Ángel Silvestre.

== Plot ==
The plot follows Carlos, who leaves behind his climbing past after discovering BASE jumping, acquainting with Darío and Armando, also practitioners of the recreational sport.

== Cast ==
- Carlos Cuevas as Carlos Suárez
- Miguel Bernardeau as Armando del Rey
- Miguel Ángel Silvestre as Darío Barrio
- Candela González as Myriam
- Stéphanie Magnin as Iris
- David Marcé as Álvaro Bultó
- José Manuel Poga as Manolo Chana

== Production ==
An Atresmedia Cine and MOD Producciones production, the film was written by Alejandro Hernández. It had the participation of Atresmedia and Netflix. The story is based on the life of Carlos Suárez and his friends Manolo Chana, Álvaro Bultó, Darío Barrio, and Armando del Rey, all of which were pioneers in BASE jumping in Spain. Chana, Bultó, and Barrio all died while jumping, and Carlos Suárez returned to BASE jumping in order to pay an homage to them in the film. Joining the film as a stunt, Carlos Suárez died on 1 April 2025 in La Villa de Don Fadrique during a collective jump from a balloon taking place on set.

Shooting locations included Spain and Switzerland.

== Release ==
Buena Vista International is scheduled to release theatrically the film in Spain on 6 February 2026.

== Reception ==
Raquel Hernández Luján of HobbyConsolas gave the film 78 points, praising how it "pits the viewer against extreme situations and offers a spectacular viewing experience", while pointing out that the female characters receive lesser and worse development.

Paula Hernández Platero of Cinemanía rated the film 4 out of 5 stars, declaring the story to be thrilling.

Javier Ocaña of El País wrote that "the result is interesting, [though] perhaps a bit uneven".

== See also ==
- List of Spanish films of 2026
