= The Patients of Dr. García =

Spanish drama television series

- Promotional release poster
- Spanish: Los pacientes del doctor García
- Genre: Drama
- Based on: Los pacientes del doctor García by Almudena Grandes
- Written by: José Luis Martín
- Directed by: Joan Noguera
- Starring: Javier Rey; Verónica Echegui; Tamar Novas
- Country of origin: Spain
- Original language: Spanish

Production
- Production companies: RTVE; Diagonal; DeAPlaneta

Original release
- Network: La 1
- Release: 19 April 2023

The Patients of Dr. García (Spanish: Los pacientes del doctor García) is a Spanish drama television series adapting the novel of the same name by Almudena Grandes. The cast is led by Javier Rey, Verónica Echegui, and Tamar Novas.

== Plot ==
Doctor Guillermo García, a communist sympathiser, remains living in Madrid after the takeover of the country by the Francoists. To save his life, he is forced to hide and adopt the false identity of Rafael Cuesta Sánchez, facilitated by his friend Manuel Arroyo, a spy for the Republican side. Years later, in 1946, García meets Arroyo again as the latter returns from exile to carry out a secret mission in the city under the assumed identity of Adrián Gallardo, a former member of the Blue Division, who is considered a war criminal for collaborating with the Nazis.

Arroyo, in the guise of a Blue Division veteran, emigrates to Argentina and infiltrates the ratlines between Juan Domingo Perón and Franco in favor of the Nazis who feel safe in South America, with the promise that the United States, through the CIA, will intervene at some point against both dictators.

== Cast ==
- Javier Rey as doctor Guillermo García Medina, a.k.a. Rafael Cuesta Sánchez
- Verónica Echegui as Amparo Priego
- Tamar Novas as Manuel Arroyo Benítez, a.k.a. Felipe Ballesteros, Peter Louzan, Adrián Gallardo
- Jon Olivares as Adrián Gallardo Ortega, a.k.a. Alfonso Navarro
- Eva Llorach as Clara Stauffer
- Stephanie Cayo as Meg Williams
- Claudia Traisac as Rita Velázquez
- Raúl Jiménez as Pepe Moya
- Nancho Novo as Fortunato Quintanilla
- Pepa Pedroche as Experta Fernández
- Luis Bermejo as Juan Negrín
- Enrique Villén as Pirulo
- Mario de la Rosa as Alfonso Navarro
- Daniel Albaladejo as Antonio Ochoa
- Martina Gusmán as Simona Gaitán
- Itziar Atienza as Geni León
- Toni Sevilla as Gabino de la Fuente
- Iñaki Miramón as Basilio Rodríguez
- Javier Lara as Jesús Romero
- Marius Biegai as Otto Skorzeny, a.k.a. Rolf Steinbauer
- Carmen Molinar as Ingrid Weiss
- Eduard Farelo as Pablo de Azcárate

== Production ==
The series is a RTVE, Diagonal (Banijay Iberia), and DeAPlaneta production, and it had the participation of Netflix. An adaptation of the novel of the same name by Almudena Grandes, the series was written by José Luis Martín and directed by Joan Noguera. Shooting started in January 2022 in Segovia and wrapped by June 2022 in Madrid. Shooting locations also included Guadalajara.

== Release ==
The series debuted on La 1 on 19 April 2023.
