= Eva Llorach =

Spanish actress (born 1979)

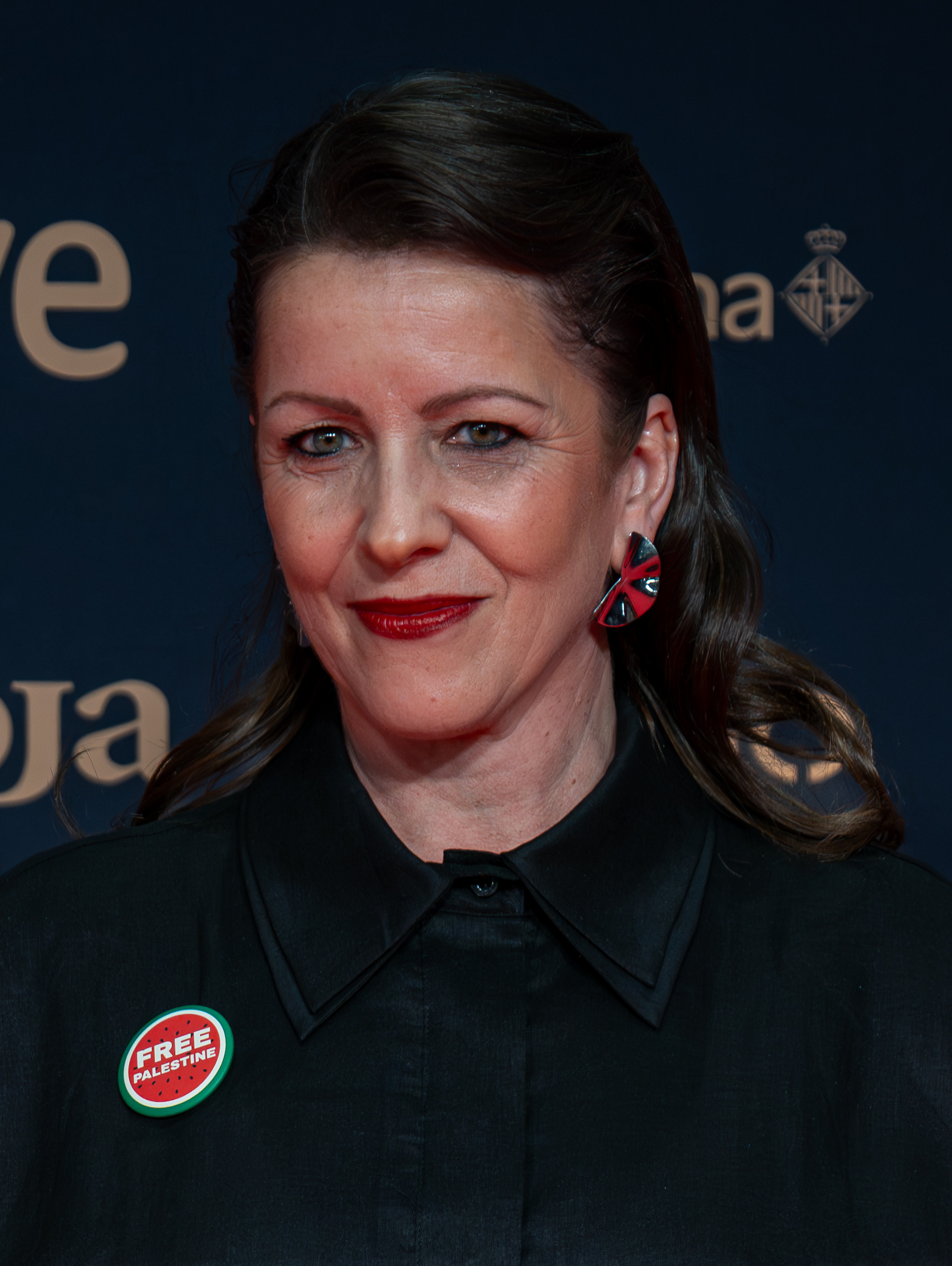
- Llorach in 2026
- Born: 1979 (age 46–47); Murcia, Spain
- Occupation: Actress

Eva Llorach (born 1979) is a Spanish actress. She had a breakout performance in the 2018 drama film Quién te cantará, which earned her the Goya Award for Best New Actress in 2019.

== Biography ==
She was born in Murcia in 1979. She worked in the company owned by his father, specialised in machine industry. A lateblooming actress, she previously studied Tourism, and also dropped out in Psychology. She trained as an actress at the Escuela Superior de Arte Dramático de Murcia.

She worked in advertising as well as she was also given a minor role in the TV series Los Quién, aired in 2011 on Antena 3. Her first performance in a feature film after she moved to Madrid was her leading role as 'Violeta' in Diamond Flash, a 2011 film directed by Carlos Vermut.

During her early career, Eva Llorach was mostly restricted to the circuit of independent cinema, and was only given minor roles in television series. She starred in the film #Realmovie (2013), in which she played the character 'Eva Binoff', a famous Spanish actress who experiences the kidnapping of her sister and has to found her she is murdered. She played too the role of a fictional actress in La lava en los labios (2013).

Her breakout performance was her role in the 2018 film Quién te cantará. She played 'Violeta', a single mother psychologically abused by her daughter 'Marta' (Natalia de Molina) and who works in a karaoke and likes to perform singer 'Lila Cassen' (Najwa Nimri), of whom Violeta is a passionate fan. Her performance in the film brought her a Forqué Award, a Feroz Award and a Goya Award in 2019.

Following her performance in Quién te cantará, she joined the cast of Elite to portray 'Sandra', the mother of 'Rebeca' (Claudia Salas) in the series. Llorach also appeared in the limited web terror series Terror y Feria. She later starred in the TV series Campamento Albanta, aired in 2020 on Atresplayer Premium: she played the role of Idalia, the founder of the camp for young people with problems central to the plot.

== Filmography ==
=== Television ===
Year	Title	Role	Notes	Ref.
2019	Elite	Sandra		
2020	Campamento Albanta	Idalia		
2023	Los pacientes del doctor García (The Patients of Dr. García)	Clara Stauffer		
2023	El cuerpo en llamas (Burning Body)	Ester		

=== Film ===
Year	Title	Role	Notes	Ref.
2011	Diamond Flash	Violeta		
2013	#Realmovie	Eva Binoff		
2013	La lava en los labios	Toni		
2013	Gente en sitios (People in Places)			
2014	Magical Girl			
2018	Quién te cantará	Violeta		
2021	Errante corazón (Wandering Heart)	Eloísa		
2022	Jaula (The Chalk Line)	Maite		
2023	La desconocida (Girl Unknown)	Elisa		
2024	Disco, Ibiza, Locomía	Nieves		
2024	Un lugar común (A Commonplace)	Pilar		
2024	El instinto (The Instinct)	Sonia		
2025	Islas (Islands)	Britt		

== Accolades ==
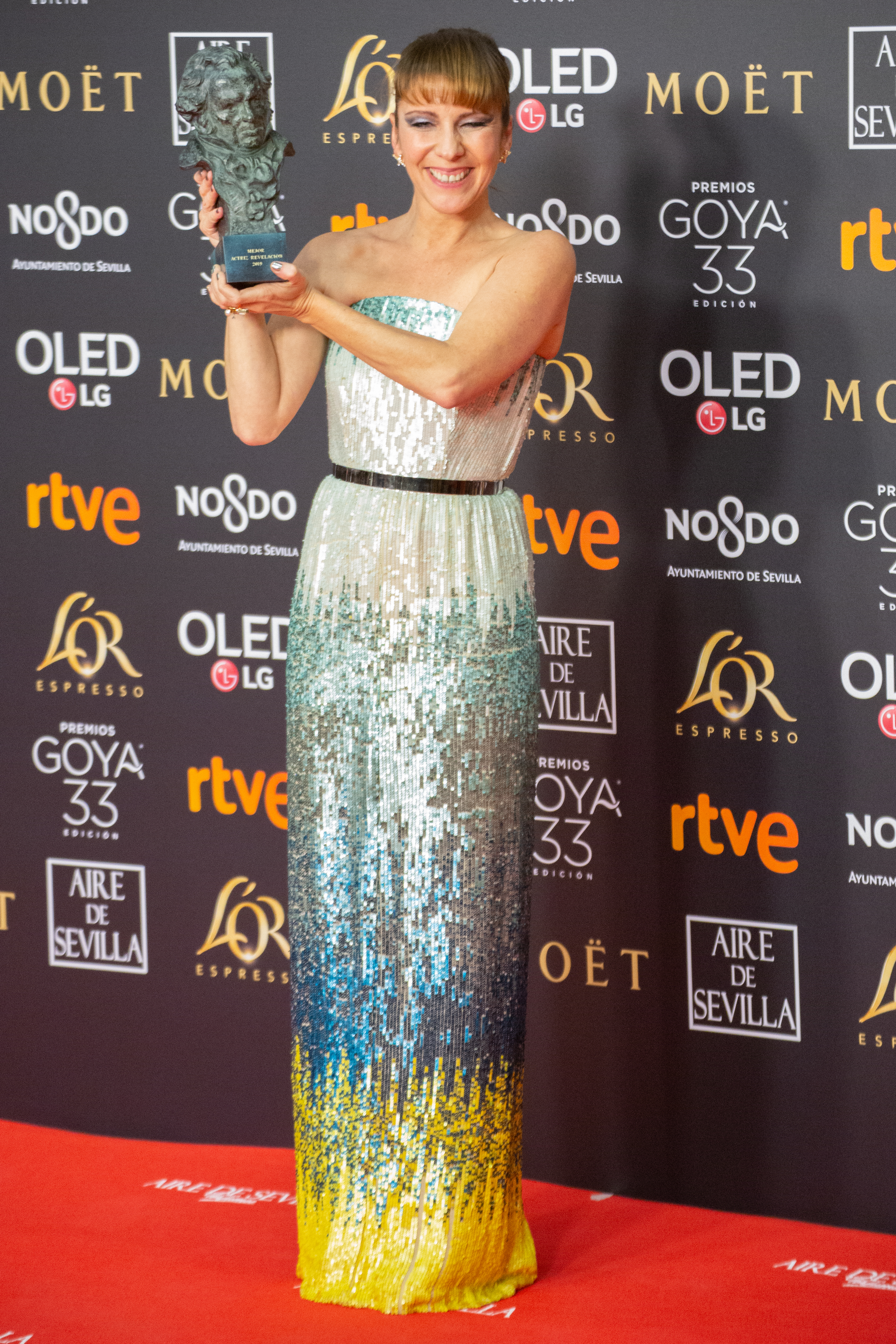
Llorach holding her Goya award statuette in 2019

Year	Award	Category	Work	Result	Ref.
2019	24th Forqué Awards	Best Leading Actress	Quién te cantará	Won	
2019	6th Feroz Awards	Best Actress in a Film	Quién te cantará	Won	
2019	74th CEC Awards	Best New Actress	Quién te cantará	Won	
2019	33rd Goya Awards	Best New Actress	Quién te cantará	Won	
2019	28th Actors and Actresses Union Awards	Best New Actress	Quién te cantará	Won	
