= Stéphanie Magnin =

Spanish actress (born 1990)

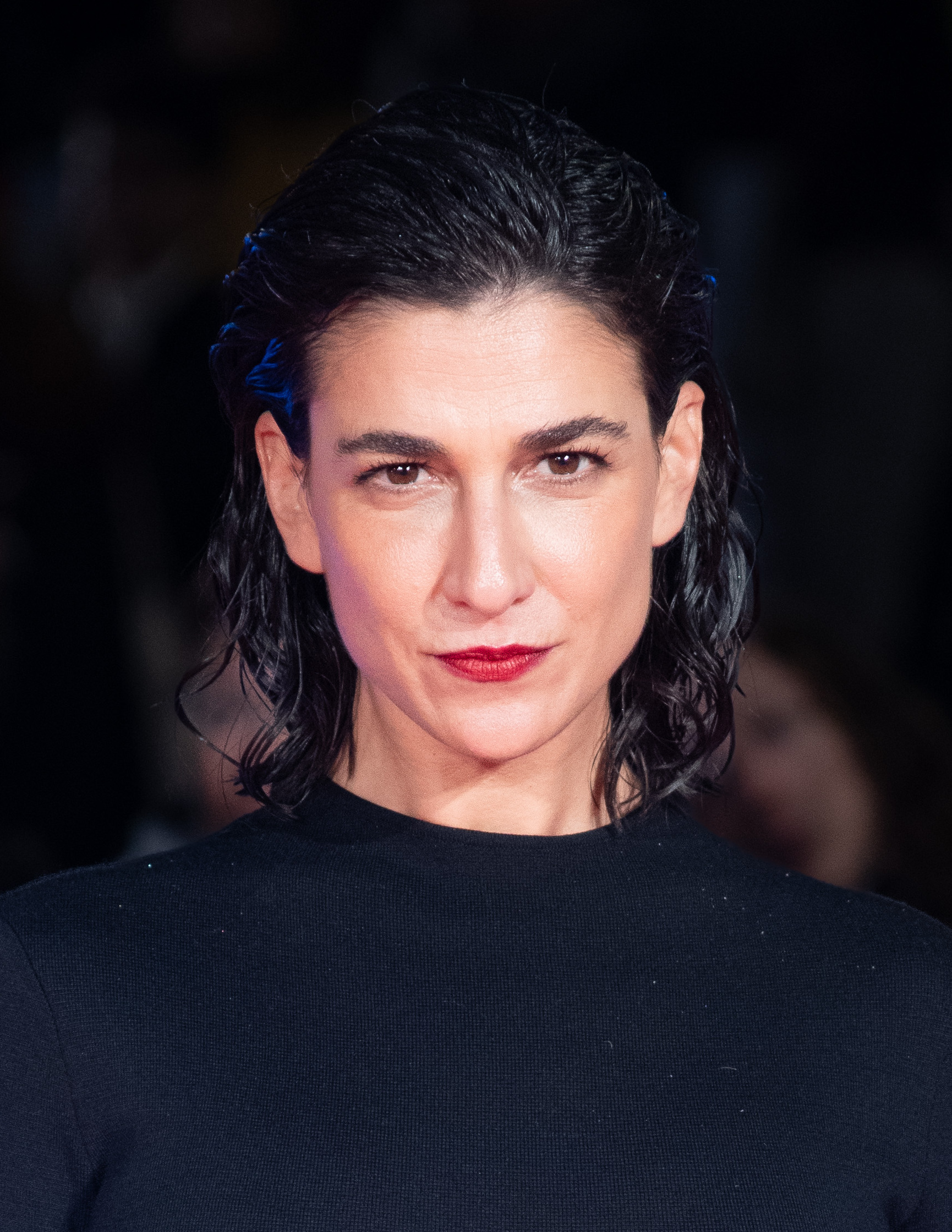
- Magnin at the 27th Málaga Film Festival on 9 March 2024
- Born: Stéphanie Magnin Vella; 1990 (age 35–36); Málaga, Andalusia, Spain
- Occupation: Actress

Stéphanie Magnin Vella (born 1990) is an actress from Spain.

== Life and career ==
Magnin was born in Málaga in 1990 to a French father and a Morocco-born Italian (Sicilian) mother. She moved to Madrid to finish a law degree, but upon completing it, she joined a theatre workshop to pursue an acting career instead.

In 2017 she directed and starred in the short film Grandfather. She made her feature film debut in the black comedy Advantages of Travelling by Train (2019). She portrayed Dora Maar in season 4 of the television series El ministerio del tiempo. She has since featured in television roles as cabo Martín in Fuerza de paz, Paola Malinverni in Mía es la venganza, Doña Carla de Morcuende in La Moderna, and in a minor part as a tour guide in The Crown's season 5, likewise featuring in films such as Piggy (2022) and How to Become a Modern Man (2023). In 2023, she wrapped shooting Isaki Lacuesta's Saturn Return.

== Filmography ==
=== Film ===
Year	Title	Role	Notes	Ref.
2019	Ventajas de viajar en tren (Advantages of Travelling by Train)	Doctora Linares		
2022	Cerdita (Piggy)	Rosa		
2023	Como Dios manda (How to Become a Modern Man)	Ana		
2024	Segundo premio (Saturn Return)	Mai		
2025	Uno equis dos (One X Two)	Cris		
2025	Todo lo que no sé (Everything I Don't Know)	Susana		
2026	La fiera (To the Max)	Iris		
2026	Los creyentes (The Truthers)	Ruth		

=== Television ===
Year	Title	Role	Notes	Ref.
2020	El ministerio del tiempo	Dora Maar	Season 4	
2022	Fuerza de paz	Cabo Martín		
2022	The Crown	Tour guide	Season 5	
2023	Mía es la venganza	Paola Malinverni		
2023	La Moderna	Doña Carla		
