= Clara Stauffer =

Spanish Falangist (1904–1984)

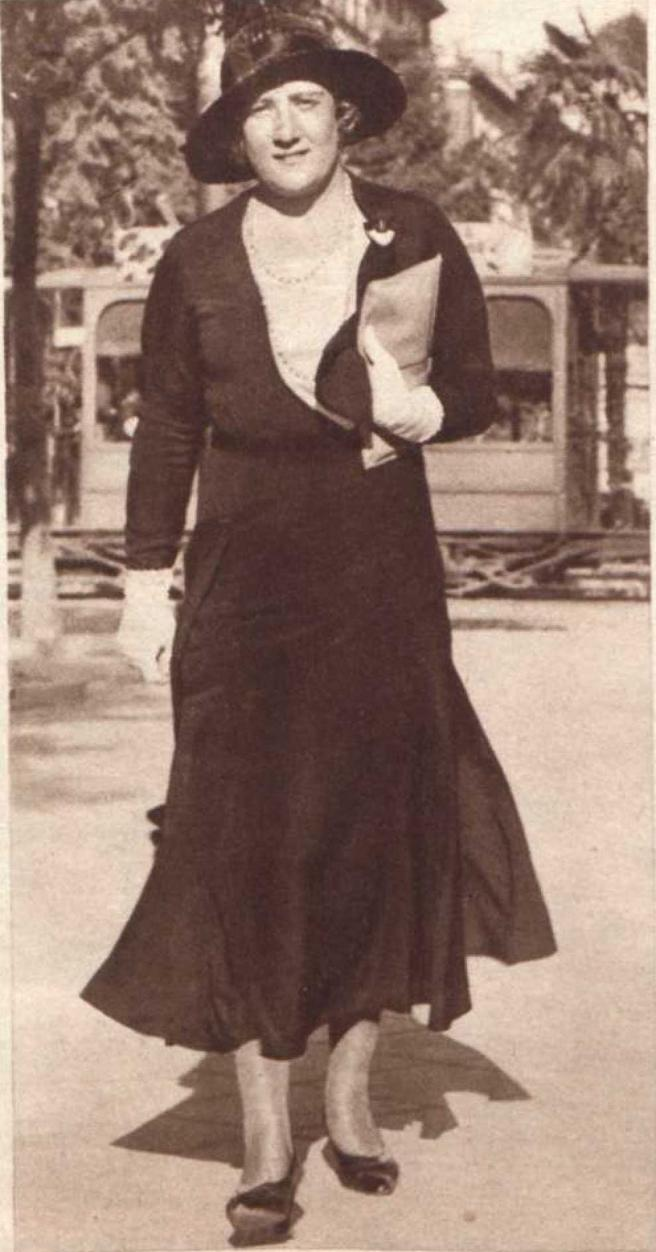
- Clara Stauffer (1931)
- Born: 1904; Madrid, Spain
- Died: 4 October 1984 (aged 79–80); Madrid, Spain
- Organization: Sección Femenina
- Movement: Falangism

Clara Stauffer (1904 – October 4, 1984) was a Spanish Falangist and Nazi ratline operator. She was a member of the Sección Femenina, a women's Falangist group, during the Spanish Civil War. She served as its chief propagandist and later as its head of foreign affairs. She was involved with the group's efforts to strengthen ties between Francoist Spain and Nazi Germany in World War II. After the war, she was one of the most prominent smugglers of Nazi fugitives, giving them shelter in Spain and arranging their travel to Argentina.

== Early life and Spanish Civil War ==
Clara Stauffer was born in Madrid in 1904. Her father was Konrad Stauffer, a German brewer that had taken charge of the Mahou brewery after he immigrated to Spain in 1889. Her mother was Clara Sofía Loewe, a member of the prominent Loewe family. Stauffer spent some of her childhood in Germany, while also spending time among Madrid's high society. She was already a prominent figure in Madrid by 1931 due to her athletic accomplishments as one of the city's first female athletes, where she excelled in swimming and skiing. Stauffer won a swimming competition in 1931 by crossing the Peñalara lagoon in under two minutes, and in 1938 she was the first woman to attempt the Flying Kilometer skiing race of St. Moritz. She failed to complete the latter event, but at one point achieved a speed of 65.59 miles per hour (105.56 km/h). To maintain her athletic prowess, she insisted on walking wherever she traversed the city. Besides athletics, she was also multilingual and was able to play the piano.

Stauffer moved back to Spain permanently in 1936. She was a member of the Sección Femenina and a close ally of its leader Pilar Primo de Rivera. During the Spanish Civil War, Stauffer worked as Sección Femenina's chief propagandist and was responsible for its press. She suggested "Auxilio Invierno" as the original name of the Nationalist charity organization during the Spanish Civil War, naming it after the Winterhilfe, both translating to "Winter Aid". Stauffer supported far-right politics and political leaders, keeping large portraits of Francisco Franco, José Antonio Primo de Rivera, Adolf Hitler, and Benito Mussolini on the wall in her office. The same year, she published a book about the Sección Femenina.

== Nazi collaboration ==
In 1943, Stauffer accompanied Pilar Primo de Rivera to Germany on a mission to strengthen relations between Germany and Spain. On this trip, she met Nazi diplomat Wilhelm Faupel, among other high-ranking Nazis. Stauffer and Faupel are believed to have collaborated regularly after this, particularly in their work protecting Nazis.

After the end of World War II in Europe, Stauffer became a major figure in Spanish–German relief efforts, which she helped form alongside José Boos. The Spanish government tacitly endorsed the operation but advised them not to heavily publicize or formalize their work. Over the following years, she worked to hide and find employment for Nazis escaping to Spain, and she became involved with the ratlines that smuggled Nazis to Argentina. Her work was primarily funded by Johannes Bernhardt, a German–Spanish businessman.

Much of her work involved securing the release of Nazis who were imprisoned in Spain, such as those at the Sobron internment camp, by taking charge of them in the capacity of a charitable organization. Stauffer's apartment became a hub for the smuggling effort, and she kept numerous outfits to serve as disguises for Nazis. Her supply was considerable; her nephew described each room as "filled with dozens of pairs of boots, shirts, jackets, trousers, socks, and gloves". She is estimated to have aided 800 Nazis in their escape to Spain, including figures such as Léon Degrelle, Otto Skorzeny, and Adolf Eichmann.

Stauffer's activities became publicly known on 23 January 1945, after British journalist Sefton Delmer published an interview with her in the Daily Express. The interview was allegedly about her work in assisting refugees, but it was coupled with an anonymous statement from a Nazi, signed "Rodak", explaining that her refugees were exclusively Nazis escaping from justice. Two years later, her name was included on the Allied Control Council repatriation list of 104 individuals in Spain wanted for their involvement in Nazi crimes. She was the only woman on the list, and she was responsible for sheltering many of the others. She maintained a working relationship with the Spanish government, which permitted her activities and prevented her extradition. In 1948, Stauffer was afflicted with pleurisy, which was attributed to the constant working and traveling she engaged in as part of the ratline.

== Death and legacy ==
Stauffer lived in Madrid for the rest of life, where she was a prominent member of the city's social life. She died in Madrid on 4 October 1984. She was a main character in two historical fiction novels: Los pozos de la nieve by Berta Vias Mahou (Acantilado, 2008; Ladera Norte, 2024) and Los pacientes del doctor García by Almudena Grandes. She was also portrayed by Eva Llorach in its television adaptation of the same name.
