= Por cien millones =

- Promotional release poster
- Genre: Comedy-drama
- Created by: Oriol Capel; Nacho G. Velilla
- Written by: Oriol Capel; Nacho G. Velilla
- Directed by: Nacho G. Velilla
- Starring: Raúl Arévalo; Vito Sanz; Gabriel Guevara
- Country of origin: Spain
- Original language: Spanish
- No. of seasons: 1
- No. of episodes: 3

Production
- Executive producers: Nacho G. Velilla; Fran Araújo; Gustavo Ferrada; Leonor Acosta
- Cinematography: Andreu Ortoll
- Production companies: Movistar Plus+; Felicitas Media

Original release
- Network: Movistar Plus+
- Release: 26 March 2026

Por cien millones is a 2026 Spanish comedy-drama miniseries created by Nacho G. Velilla and Oriol Capel. Tackling the 1981 kidnapping of football striker Quini, it stars Raúl Arévalo, Vito Sanz, and Gabriel Guevara.

The miniseries was released on Movistar Plus+ on 26 March 2026.

== Plot ==
In 1981, three mechanics from Zaragoza, desperate for work and money, kidnap FC Barcelona's striker Quini.

== Cast ==
- Raúl Arévalo as Alfonso
- Vito Sanz as Jorge
- Gabriel Guevara as Salva
- Agustín Otón as Quini
- Aixa Villagrán
- Natalia Huarte
- María de Nati
- La Dani as Alexanco
- Julia de Castro
- Nacho Guerreros
- Teresa Rabal
- Josele Román

== Production ==
Por cien millones is a Movistar Plus+ original series produced in collaboration with Felicitas Media. Shooting locations included Madrid, Barcelona, Zaragoza, and Switzerland. Andreu Ortoll worked as cinematographer.

== Release ==
The series was presented on 8 March 2026 at the 29th Málaga Film Festival. It was released on 26 March 2026 on Movistar Plus+.

== Reception ==
Laura Pérez of Fotogramas rated the series 4 out of 5 stars pointing out that the secret lies in the writing and in actors' performances of its three lead characters, corresponding to archetypes of Spanish picaresque.

Raquel Hernández Luján of HobbyConsolas gave the film 75 points, describing it as a "good period portrait that uses humour to highlight uncomfortable realities".

Jose Madrid of El Confidencial rated the series 3½ out of 5 stars, deeming the "efficient" miniseries to be "a farce performed by a trio of losers that taps into something deeply Spanish".
