= Luisa Carnés =

Spanish fiction writer and journalist

Luisa Carnés (3 January 1905 – 12 March 1964) was a Spanish fiction writer and journalist.

== Early life and work ==
Carnés was born in Madrid, the daughter of a barber and a seamstress and the oldest of six children. Economic hardship in her family caused her to leave school at age eleven to become a hatmaker's apprentice. An autodidact, she was an avid reader of Cervantes, Dostoevsky, Tolstoy, and Gorky, among others, and began to write in the evenings. In 1928 she published a collection of short stories, Peregrinos de Calvario, and in 1930, her first novel, Natacha. Both were published by her employer, the Compañía Iberoamericana de Publicaciones (CIAP), where she did editorial work and where she met her first husband, the graphic artist Ramón Puyol (1907-1981).

In 1931, after the publisher went bankrupt, she and Puyol moved from Madrid to Algeciras. In 1932 she separated from Puyol and returned to Madrid. Unable to support herself by writing, she began waitressing in a tea room, an experience that inspired what is generally regarded as her best work, Tea Rooms. Mujeres obreras (Tea Rooms. Working-Class Women).

She was a member of the Communist Party of Spain (PCE) and an advocate for women's suffrage. An avid defender of the Spanish Republic, after the Spanish Civil War broke out in 1936 she wrote articles and plays in its defense. When the Spanish Republic fell in 1939, she crossed the border to France and from there sailed to Mexico, where, like many Spanish Republicans, she was granted asylum. She lived in Mexico City until her death in 1964 in a car accident.

Long forgotten in Spain, since 2002 much of her work has been brought back into print. In 2019 a commemorative plaque was placed on the building where she was born, at Calle Lope de Vega, 31, Madrid. In 2020 her short story "Without a Compass" was published in an English translation by Catherine Nelson in Barricade: A Journal of Antifascism & Translation.

== Bibliography ==
- Cumpleaños. Los bancos del Prado. Los vendedores de miedo, Publicaciones de la Asociación de Directores de Escena de España, Madrid, 2002.
- El eslabón perdido, Editorial Renacimiento, Sevilla, 2002.
- Tea Rooms. Mujeres obreras, Hoja de Lata, Asturias, 2016
- De Barcelona a la Bretaña francesa, Editorial Renacimiento, 2017
- Trece cuentos (1931-1963), Hoja de Lata, Asturias, 2017.
- De Barcelona a la Bretaña francesa. Memorias, Biblioteca del exilio, Sevilla, 2017.
- Rosalía. Raíz apasionada de Galicia, Hoja de Lata, Asturias, 2018.
- Rojo y gris, Editorial Renacimiento, Sevilla, 2018.
- Donde brotó el laurel, Editorial Renacimiento, Sevilla, 2018.
- Natacha, Editorial Renacimiento, Sevilla, 2019.
