= Peguerinos =

- municipality
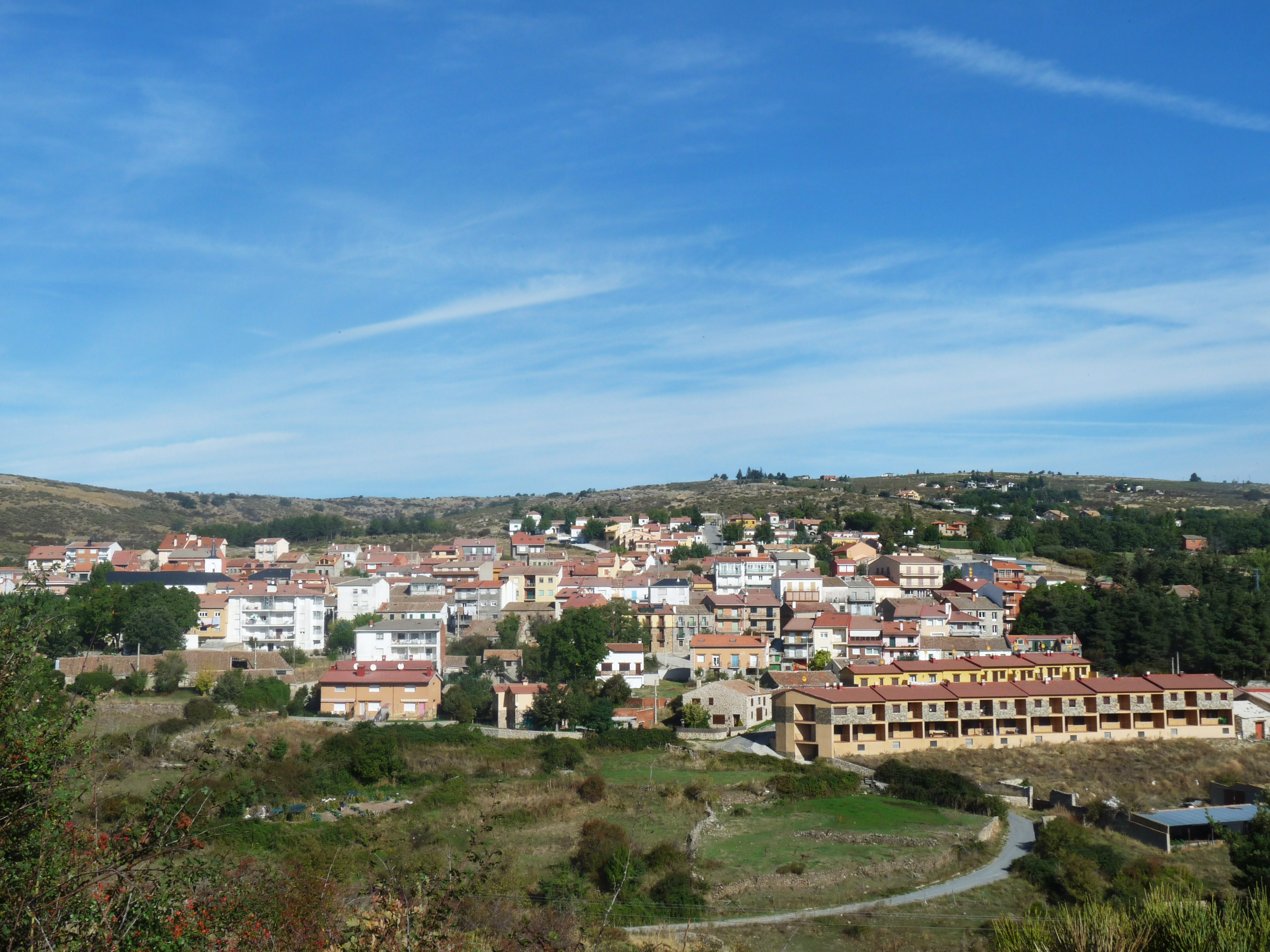

- Flag Coat of arms

- Location in Spain. Peguerinos (Spain)
- Coordinates: 40°37′38″N 4°13′58″W
- Country: Spain
- Autonomous community: Castile and León
- Province: Ávila
- Municipality: Peguerinos

Area
  - Total: 87.01 km^{2} (33.59 sq mi)
- Elevation: 1,351 m (4,432 ft)

Population (2025-01-01)
  - Total: 283
  - Density: 3.25/km^{2} (8.42/sq mi)
- Time zone: UTC+1 (CET)
  - Summer (DST): UTC+2 (CEST)
- Website: Official website

Peguerinos is a municipality located in the province of Ávila, Castile and León, Spain.

== Population ==
Historical population
Year	Pop.	±% p.a.
2023	303	—
2024	294	−2.97%
2025	283	−3.74%
Source: INE
