= Alberto Gracia =

Spanish artist (born 1978)

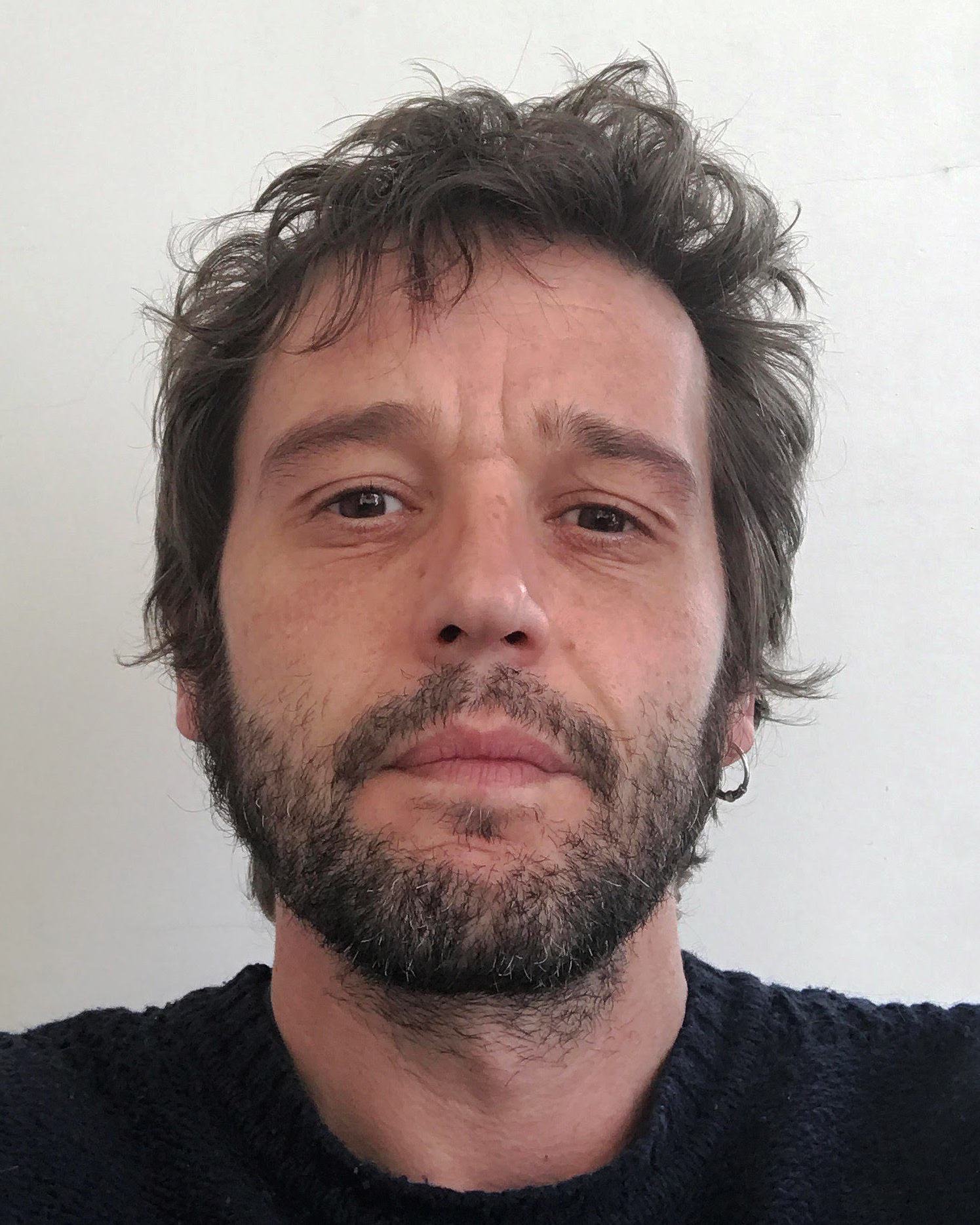
- Gracia in 2022
- Born: 1978 (age 47–48); Ferrol, Galicia, Spain
- Education: University of Vigo
- Occupations: Artist; Filmmaker

Alberto García Hermida (born 1978), known professionally as Alberto Gracia, is a Spanish artist and filmmaker.

== Career ==
Gracia was born in 1978 in Ferrol, Galicia. He studied sculpture at the Faculty of Fine Arts of Pontevedra, the art school of the University of Vigo. After graduating, he moved to Barcelona in 2002, where he lived until 2014. Gracia currently lives in Madrid.

Between 2008 and 2009, Gracia received a Hangar grant. During this time, he exhibited his work at the Barcelona Museum of Contemporary Art, the Centre de Cultura Contemporània de Barcelona, LABoral Centro de Arte y Creación Industrial in Gijón, and the Museo de Arte Contemporáneo Gas Natural Fenosa in A Coruña, in addition to internationally in Austria and France.

Since 2013, Gracia's work has primarily focused on film. Alongside filmmakers like Oliver Laxe, Lois Patiño and Jaione Camborda, he has been described as being part of New Galician Cinema. His first short film, Microfugas (2008), was followed by a 2010 essay, Microfugas. Teoría y juego de la profanación. In 2013, Gracia released his first full-length film, O quinto evanxeo de Gaspar Hauser, for which he won the International Federation of Film Critics' Critics' Prize at the International Film Festival Rotterdam.

Gracia's second film, The Wandering Star, screened at the Seville European Film Festival in 2018. His third film, La Parra, premiered in the main competition at the 2024 International Film Festival Rotterdam. In 2024, Gracia was awarded the Cineuropa Prize, alongside Spanish-Swedish actress Ingrid García-Jonsson and Brazilian filmmaker Flavia Castro. That same year, he had a supporting role in Carla Simón's film Romería, alongside Llúcia Garcia, Mitch Robles, Tristán Ulloa, Janet Novás, Miryam Gallego, José Ángel Egido and Alberto Gracia. The film premiered as part of the official selection at the 2025 Cannes Film Festival.
