= Ahmed Hammoud =

Moroccan actor

- أحمد حمود
- Born: July 12, 1991 (age 34); Morocco
- Occupation: Actor
- Years active: 2015–present
- Website: hammoud3000.com

Ahmed Hammoud (born 12 July 1991) is a Moroccan actor. He is best known for the roles in the films 13 Hours, Mimosas and Zanka Contact.

== Career ==
He started acting career with several commercial advertisements. Then in 2016, he was selected for a minor role in the American biographical action thriller war film 13 Hours: The Secret Soldiers of Benghazi directed by Michael Bay. He played the role of 'Attacker at Embassy'. Filming began on April 27, 2015 in Malta and Morocco and the film was released on January 15, 2016, by Paramount Pictures. The film later received an Oscar nomination for Best Sound Mixing at the 89th Academy Awards.

With the success of the film, he was then selected for the lead role in the drama film Mimosas directed by Oliver Laxe. In the film, he played one of the lead role 'Ahmed'. The film was produced as a collaborative work between Spain, Morocco, France and Qatar. It was screened in the Critics' Week section at the 2016 Cannes Film Festival and later won the Nespresso Grand Prize.

In 2017, he joined the French television serial The Bureau with the role 'Djihadiste Botte'. In 2020, he starred in the French drama film Home Front and played the supportive role 'Idir'.

== Filmography ==
Year	Film	Role	Genre	Ref.
2016	13 Hours: The Secret Soldiers of Benghazi	Attacker at Embassy	Film	
2016	Mimosas	Ahmed	Film	
2017	The Bureau	Djihadiste Botte	TV series	
2019	The Breitner Commando	Walid	Film	
2020	Home Front	Idir	Film	
2020	Zanka Contact	Larsen	Film	
