= Mitch Robles =

Spanish actor (born 2003)

- Robles in 2025
- Born: 2003 (age 22–23)
- Citizenship: Spain
- Occupations: Actor; Musician
- Mother: Marta Robles

Miguel Martín de Bustamente (born 2003), known professionally as Mitch Robles or simply Mitch, is a Spanish musician and actor.

== Career ==
Robles is the second child of journalist and writer Marta Robles and Luis Martín de Bustamente, the former president of the multinational telecommunications company Telefónica. Robles started playing the guitar from the age of 15, and as a teenager was a member of the band The Boston Babies.

As an actor, Robles had a main role in the third series of the Televisión Española high school drama series HIT. In 2024, he had a leading role in Carla Simón's film Romería, alongside Llúcia Garcia, Tristán Ulloa, Janet Novás, Miryam Gallego, José Ángel Egido and Alberto Gracia. The film premiered as part of the official selection at the 2025 Cannes Film Festival. For his role in Romería, Robles was nominated for the CEC Award for Best New Actor.
