= Goya Award for Best New Actress =

Annual award by the Spanish Film Academy

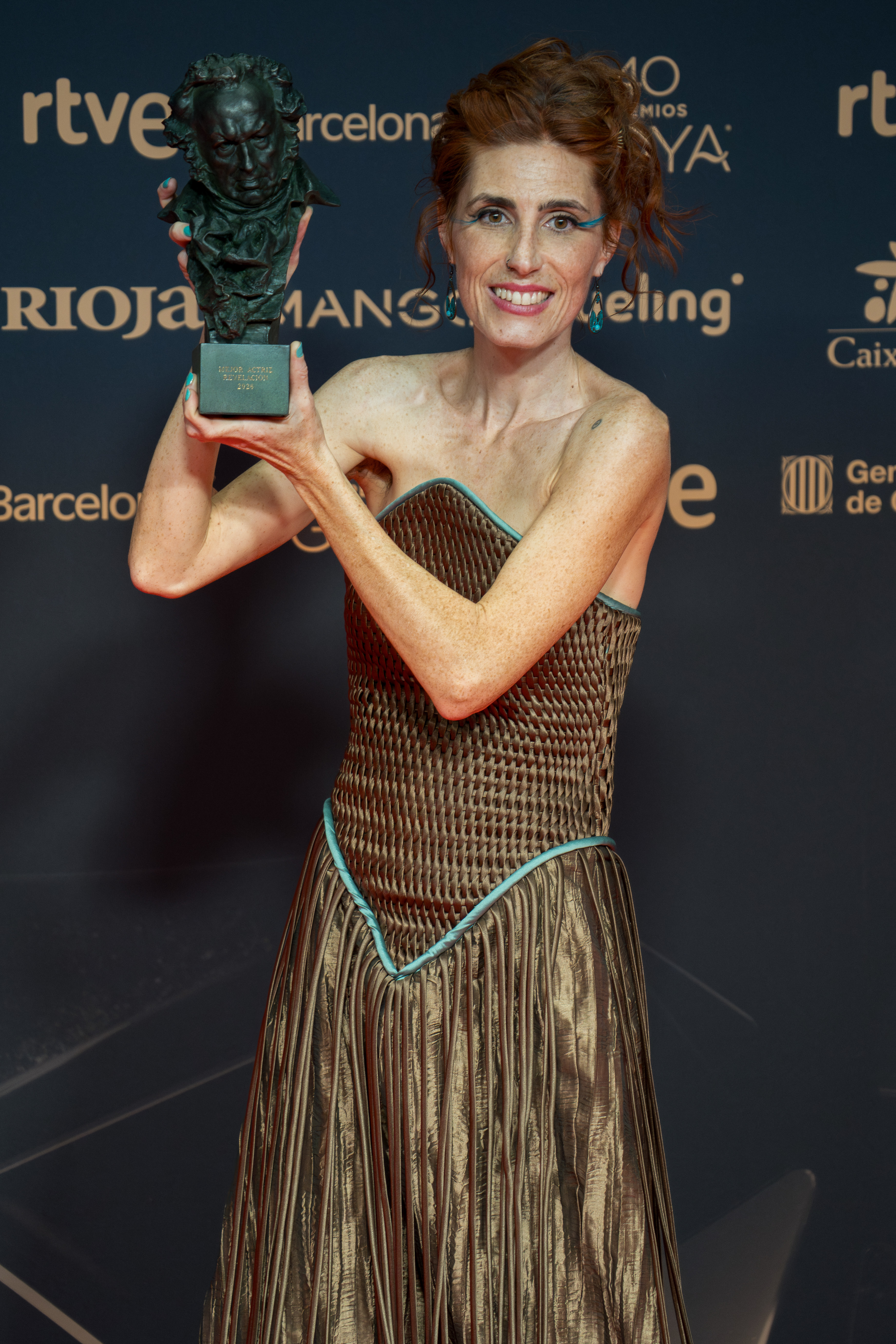
- The 2026 winner: Miriam Garlo
- Native name: Premio Goya a la mejor actriz revelación
- Awarded for: Best performance by a debuting actress in a Spanish film of the year
- Country: Spain
- Presented by: Academy of Cinematographic Arts and Sciences of Spain (AACCE)
- First award: 9th Goya Awards (1994)
- Most recent winner: Miriam Garlo; Deaf (2025)
- Website: Official website

The Goya Award for Best New Actress (Spanish: Premio Goya a la mejor actriz revelación) is one of the Goya Awards presented annually by the Academy of Cinematographic Arts and Sciences of Spain (AACCE) since the 9th edition of the awards in 1994. It is given in honor of an actress, in one of their first prominent film roles, who has delivered an outstanding leading or supporting performance in a Spanish film.

== History ==
Since its inception, the award has been given to 30 actresses. At the 9th Goya Awards ceremony held in 1995, Ruth Gabriel was the first winner of this award for her role in Running Out of Time.

Multiple winners and nominees in the category have gone on to win or be nominated for the other two female performance categories at the Goya Awards (Best Actress and Best Supporting Actress). Winner Natalia de Molina and nominees Candela Peña, Blanca Portillo, Malena Alterio, Nathalie Poza, and Bárbara Lennie have all won Best Actress. Additionally, the only actress who has won Goya awards in all three female acting categories is Laia Marull.

Since the 26th edition (2011) to be a candidate in any acting category, the only condition is to be over 16 years of age. Before that edition, four actresses under 16 years of age won the award: Ivana Baquero, Nerea Camacho, Marina Comas and María Valverde. Benedicta Sánchez is the oldest winner at the age of 84 for her role in Fire Will Come.

For the 39th ceremony, the Academy of Cinematographic Arts and Sciences of Spain introduced a modification consisting of the requirement of an authorization signed by the actress accepting her participation in the Goya Awards. For the 41st ceremony, new regulations were established, setting as a requirement that candidates must not have appeared in more than four feature films released in commercial theaters as a supporting actress, and that they must not have worked professionally as a film actress for more than 10 years.

As of the 2026 ceremony, Miriam Garlo is the most recent winner in this category for her role as Ángela in Deaf.

== Winners and nominees ==
In the following table, the years are listed as per Academy convention, and generally correspond to the year of film release; the ceremonies are always held the following year.

Table key
‡	Indicates the winner

=== 1990s ===
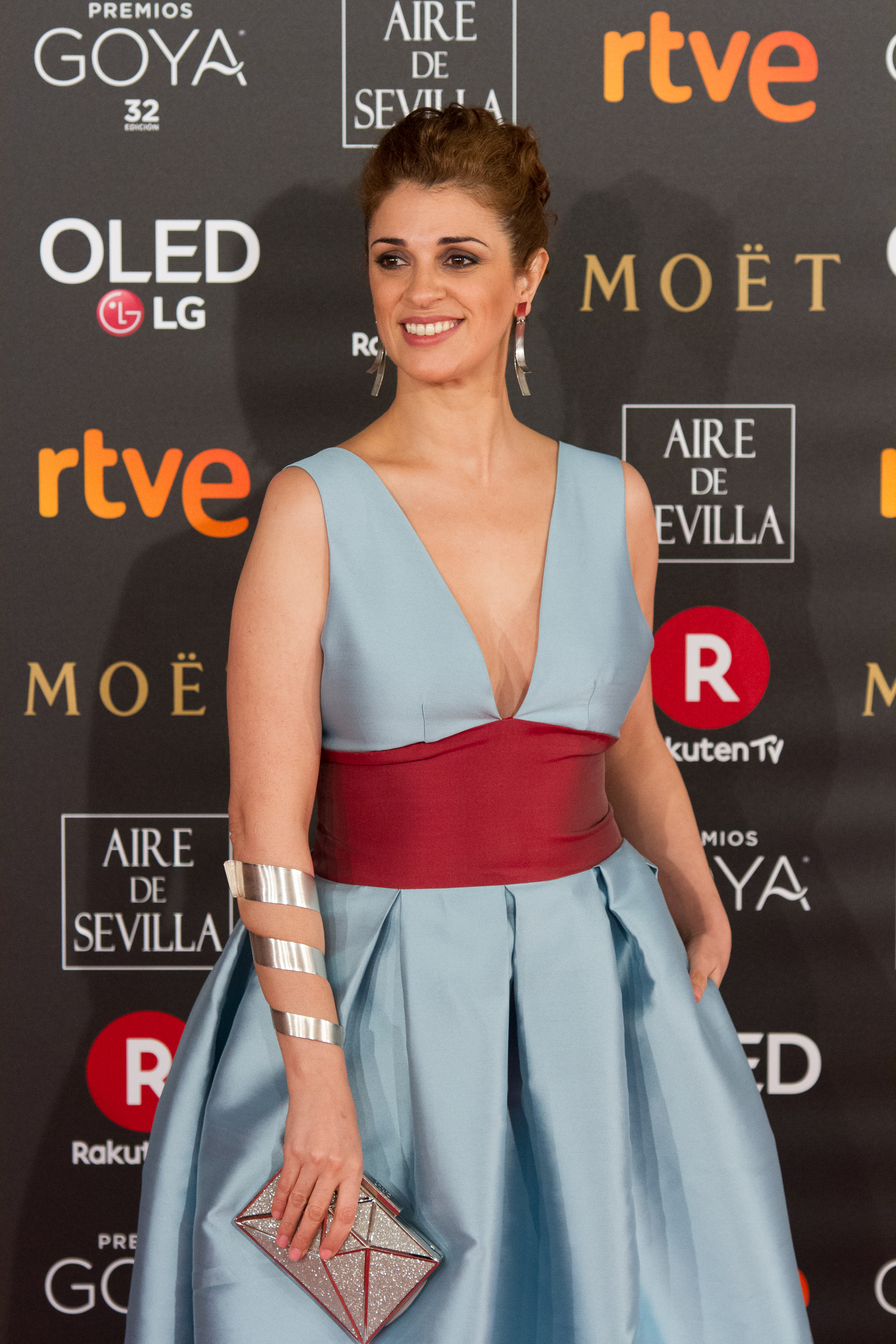
Ruth Gabriel was the first winner in this category for her performance in Running Out of Time (1994)

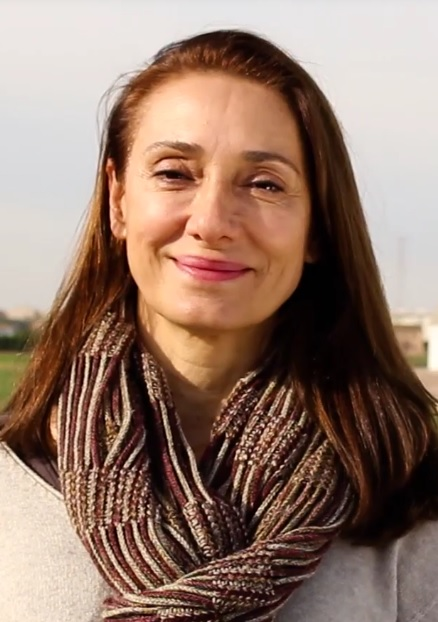
Rosana Pastor won for Beyond the Garden in 1996.

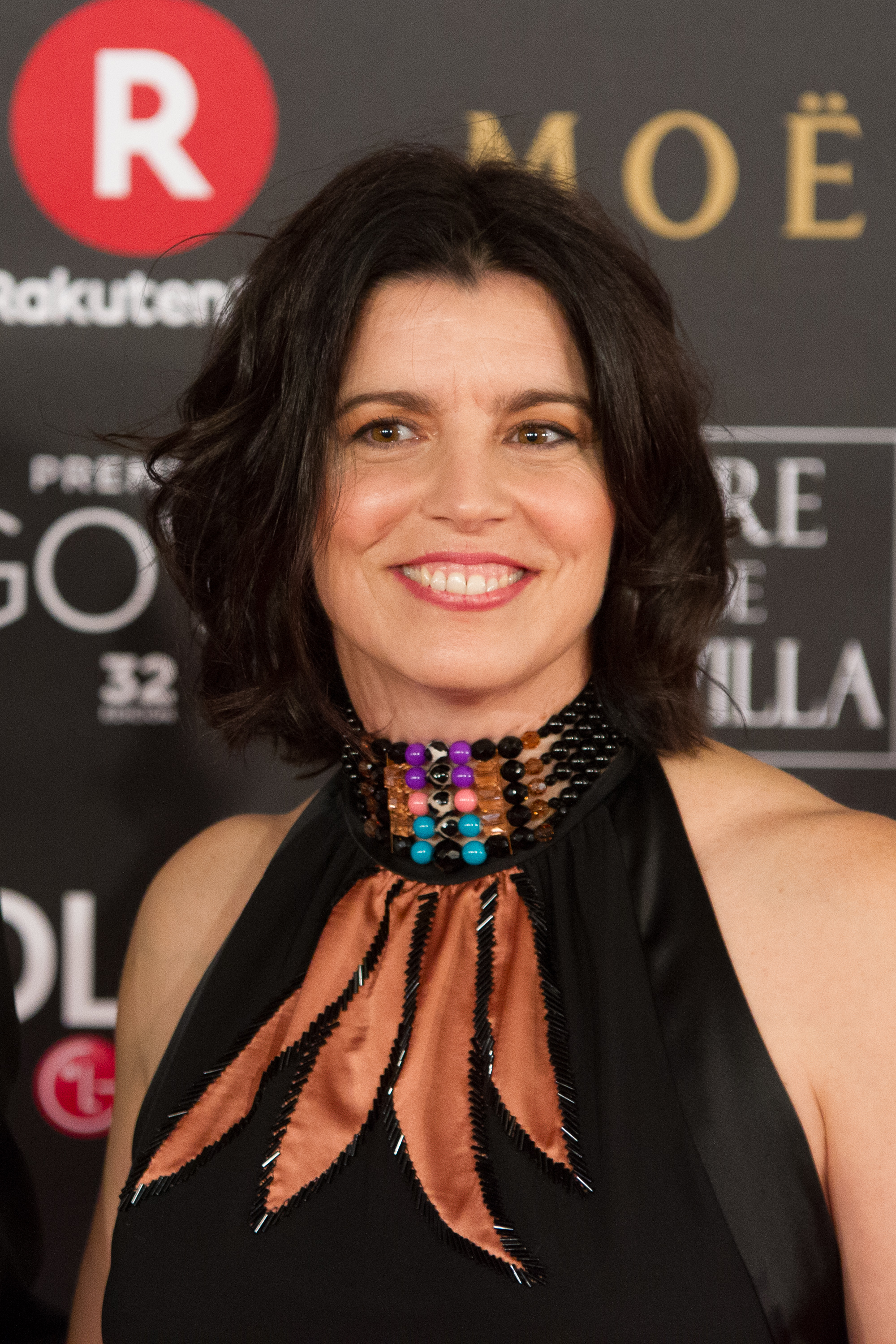
The only performer who has won Goya awards in all three acting categories is Laia Marull, who won best new actress in 2000 for Fugitives, best actress in 2003 for Take My Eyes, and best supporting actress in 2010 for Black Bread

Year	Actress	Role(s)	English title	Original title
1994 (9th)	Ruth Gabriel ‡	Charo	Running Out of Time	Días contados
1994 (9th)	Elvira Mínguez	Lourdes	Running Out of Time	Días contados
1994 (9th)	Candela Peña	Vanesa	Running Out of Time	Días contados
1995 (10th)	Rosana Pastor ‡	Blanca	Land and Freedom	Tierra y libertad
1995 (10th)	Amara Carmona	Lucía	Gypsy Soul	Alma gitana
1995 (10th)	María Pujalte	Cata	Women in Prison	Entre rojas
1996 (11th)	Íngrid Rubio ‡	Helena	Beyond the Garden	Más allá del jardín
1996 (11th)	Lucía Jiménez	Lucía	The Good Life	La buena vida
1996 (11th)	Silke	Mari	Earth	Tierra
1997 (12th)	Isabel Ordaz ‡	Lucía	Chevrolet	
1997 (12th)	Paulina Gálvez	Cristina de León	Retrato de mujer con hombre al fondo	
1997 (12th)	Blanca Portillo	Mother	The Color of the Clouds	El color de las nubes
1998 (13th)	Marieta Orozco ‡	Susi	Barrio	
1998 (13th)	María Esteve	Carlota	Nothing in the Fridge	Nada en la nevera
1998 (13th)	Violeta Rodríguez	Nena	Things I Left in Havana	Cosas que dejé en La Habana
1998 (13th)	Goya Toledo	Mararía	Mararía	
1999 (14th)	Ana Fernández ‡	María	Alone	Solas
1999 (14th)	Silvia Abascal	Lola	The Yellow Fountain	La fuente amarilla
1999 (14th)	María Botto	Cinta	Jealousy	Celos
1999 (14th)	Antonia San Juan	Agrado	All About My Mother	Todo sobre mi madre

=== 2000s ===
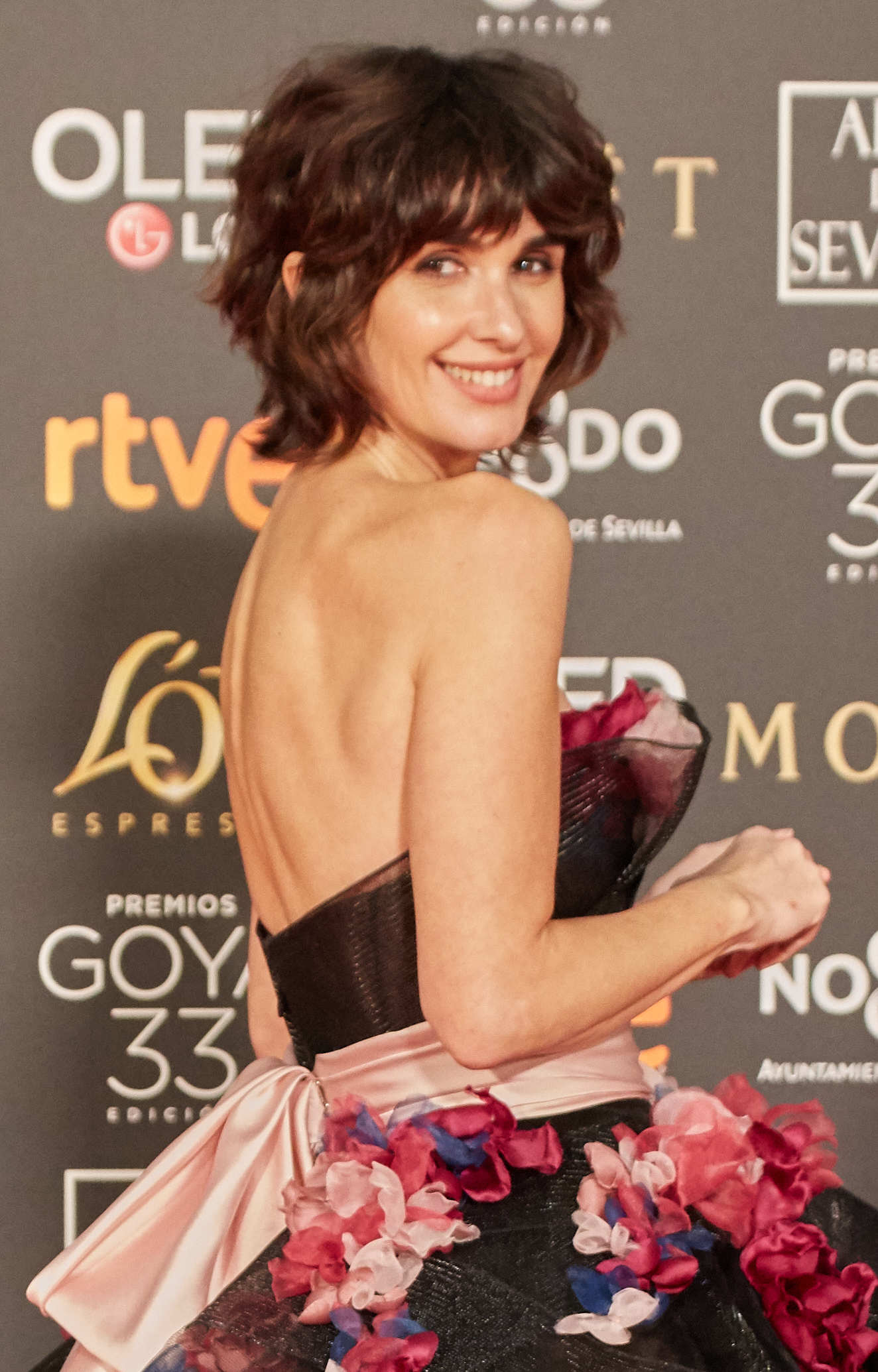
Paz Vega won for Sex and Lucia (2001)

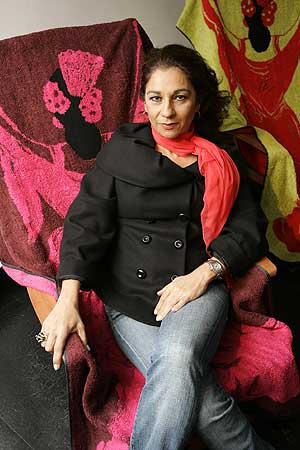
Singer Lolita Flores won for Rancour (2002)

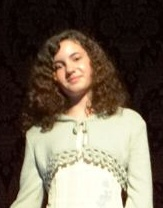
Ivana Baquero is the youngest recipient of the award at 12 years of age for her role in Pan's Labyrinth (2006)

Year	Actress	Role(s)	English title	Original title
2000 (15th)	Laia Marull ‡	Tony	Fugitives	Fugitivas
2000 (15th)	Pilar López de Ayala	Rocío	Kisses for Everyone	Besos para todos
2000 (15th)	Luisa Martín	Julia	Miserable Life	Terca vida
2000 (15th)	Antònia Torrens	Sister Francisca	The Sea	El mar
2001 (16th)	Paz Vega ‡	Lucía	Sex and Lucia	Lucía y el sexo
2001 (16th)	Malena Alterio	Violeta "Pecholata"	The Hold-Up	El palo
2001 (16th)	María Isasi	Lucía	Savages	Salvajes
2001 (16th)	Alakina Mann	Anne Stewart	The Others	The Others
2002 (17th)	Lolita Flores ‡	Chelo	Rancour	Rencor
2002 (17th)	Nieve de Medina	Ana	Mondays in the Sun	Los lunes al sol
2002 (17th)	Clara Lago	Carol	Carol's Journey	El viaje de Carol
2002 (17th)	Marta Etura	Rosana	Nobody's Life	La vida de nadie
2003 (18th)	María Valverde ‡	María	The Weakness of the Bolshevik	La flaqueza del bolchevique
2003 (18th)	Verónica Sánchez	Juliana	Al sur de Granada	
2003 (18th)	Nathalie Poza	Patricia	Football Days	Días de fútbol
2003 (18th)	Elisabet Gelabert	Lola	Take My Eyes	Te doy mis ojos
2004 (19th)	Belén Rueda ‡	Julia	The Sea Inside	Mar adentro
2004 (19th)	Teresa Hurtado de Ory	Laura	Astronauts	Astronautas
2004 (19th)	Mónica Cervera	Lourdes	The Ferpect Crime	Crimen ferpecto
2004 (19th)	Núria Gago	Fany	Héctor	
2005 (20th)	Micaela Nevárez ‡	Zulema	Princesas	
2005 (20th)	Isabel Ampudia	Isabel	15 Days with You	15 días contigo
2005 (20th)	Bárbara Lennie	Lourdes	Obaba	Obaba
2005 (20th)	Alba Rodríguez	Patri	7 Virgins	7 vírgenes
2006 (21st)	Ivana Baquero ‡	Ofelia / Princess Moanna	Pan's Labyrinth	El laberinto del fauno
2006 (21st)	Bebe	Sezar	The Education of Fairies	La educación de las hadas
2006 (21st)	Verónica Echegui	Juani	My Name Is Juani	Yo soy la Juani
2006 (21st)	Adriana Ugarte	Consuelo	Doghead	Cabeza de perro
2007 (22nd)	Manuela Velasco ‡	Ángela Vidal	[•REC]	
2007 (22nd)	Gala Évora	Lola Flores	Lola, the Movie	Lola, la película
2007 (22nd)	Barbara Goenaga	Emma	Oviedo Express	Oviedo Express
2007 (22nd)	Nadia de Santiago	Carmen	13 Roses	13 rosas
2008 (23rd)	Nerea Camacho ‡	Camino	Camino	
2008 (23rd)	Farah Hamed	Leila	Return to Hansala	Retorno a Hansala
2008 (23rd)	Esperanza Pedreño	Milagros	One Word from You	Una palabra tuya
2008 (23rd)	Ana Wagener	Dolores	My Prison Yard	El patio de mi cárcel
2009 (24th)	Soledad Villamil ‡	Irene Menéndez Hastings	The Secret in Their Eyes	El secreto de sus ojos
2009 (24th)	Blanca Romero	Ana	After	
2009 (24th)	Leticia Herrero	Sofía	Fat People	Gordos
2009 (24th)	Nausicaa Bonnín	Léa	Three Days With the Family	Tres dies amb la família

=== 2010s ===
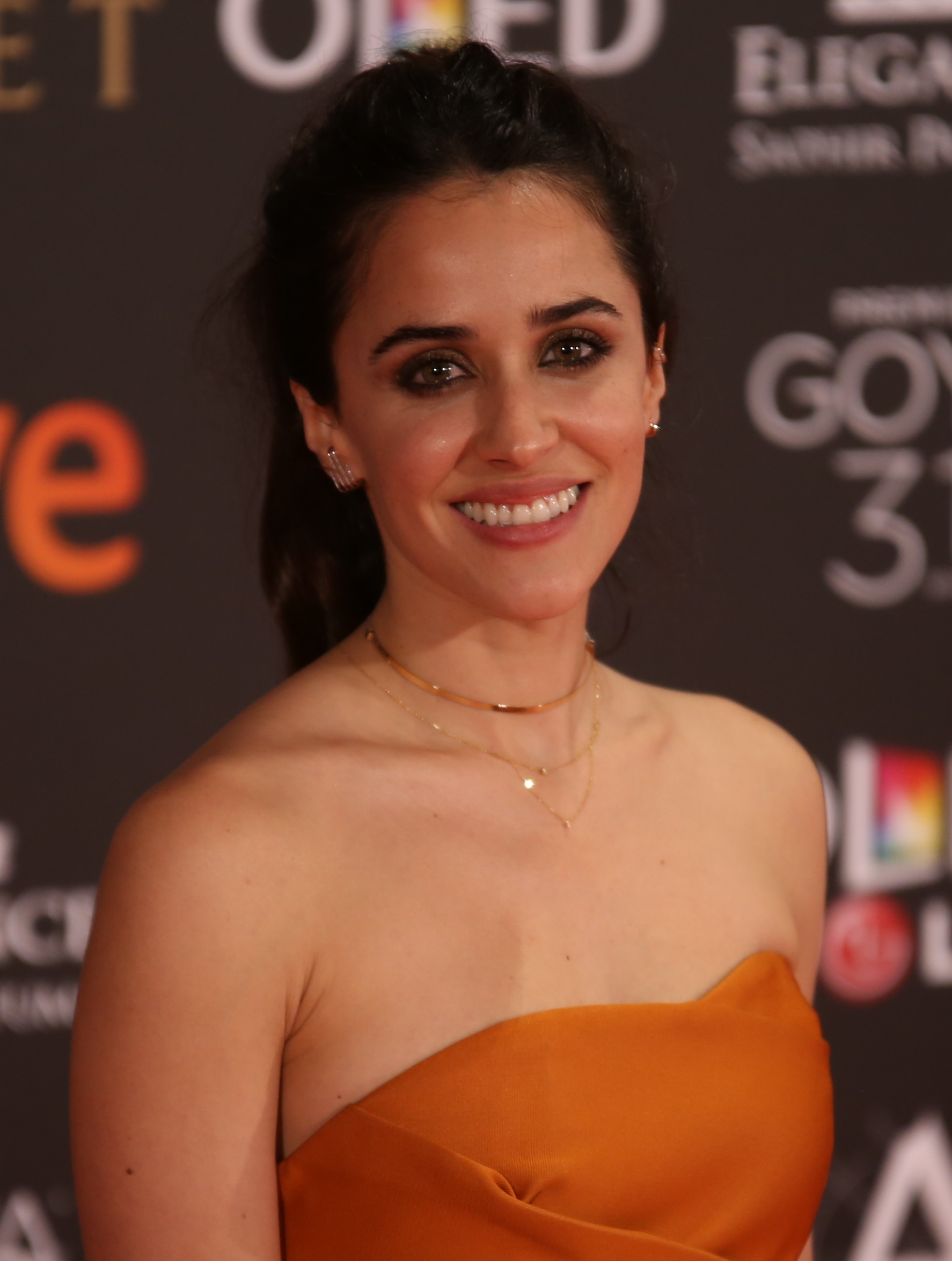
Macarena García won for her performance in Snow White (2012)

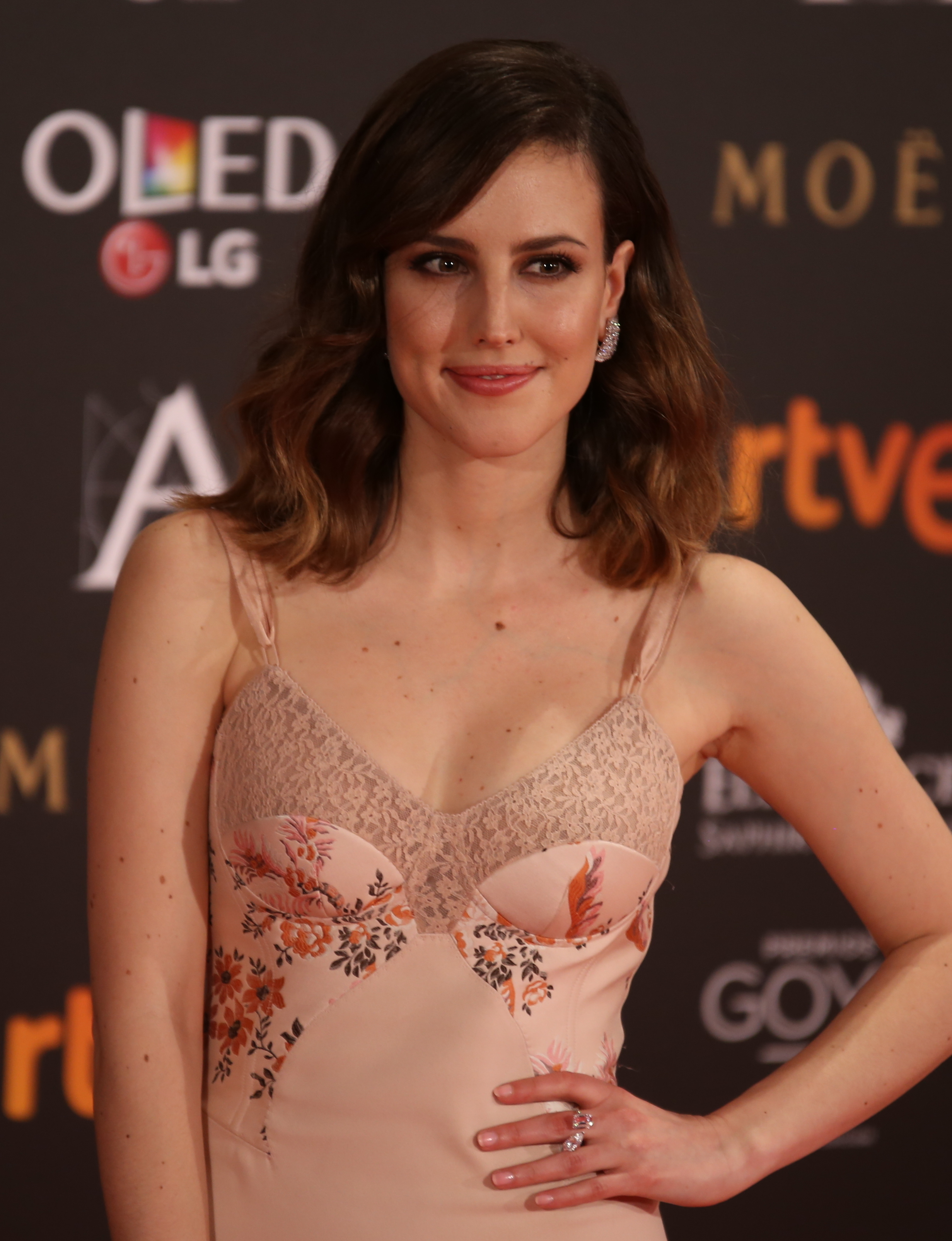
Natalia de Molina won for her role in Living Is Easy with Eyes Closed (2013) and went on to win best actress award for Food and Shelter (2015)

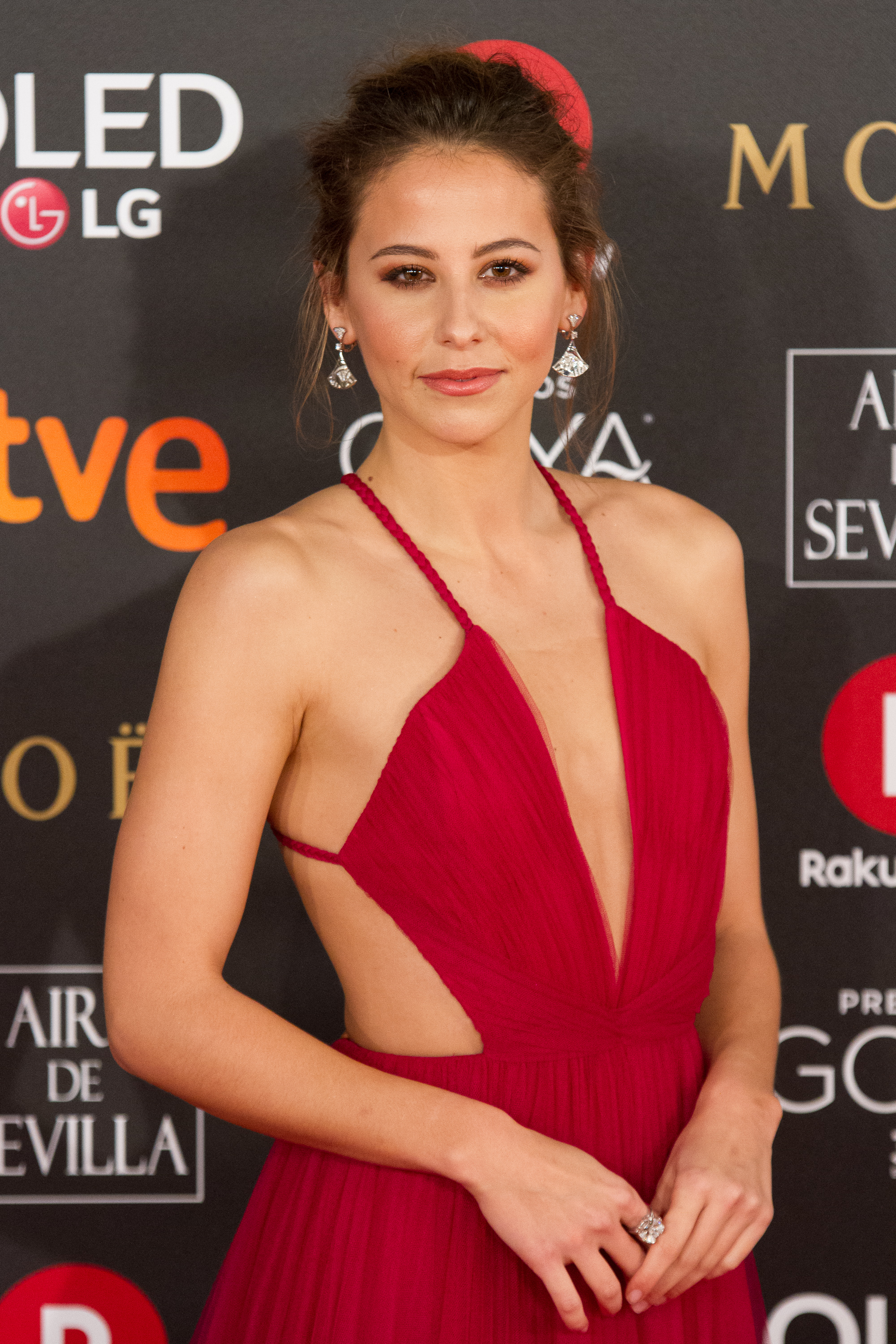
Irene Escolar won for her performance in An Autumn Without Berlin (2015)

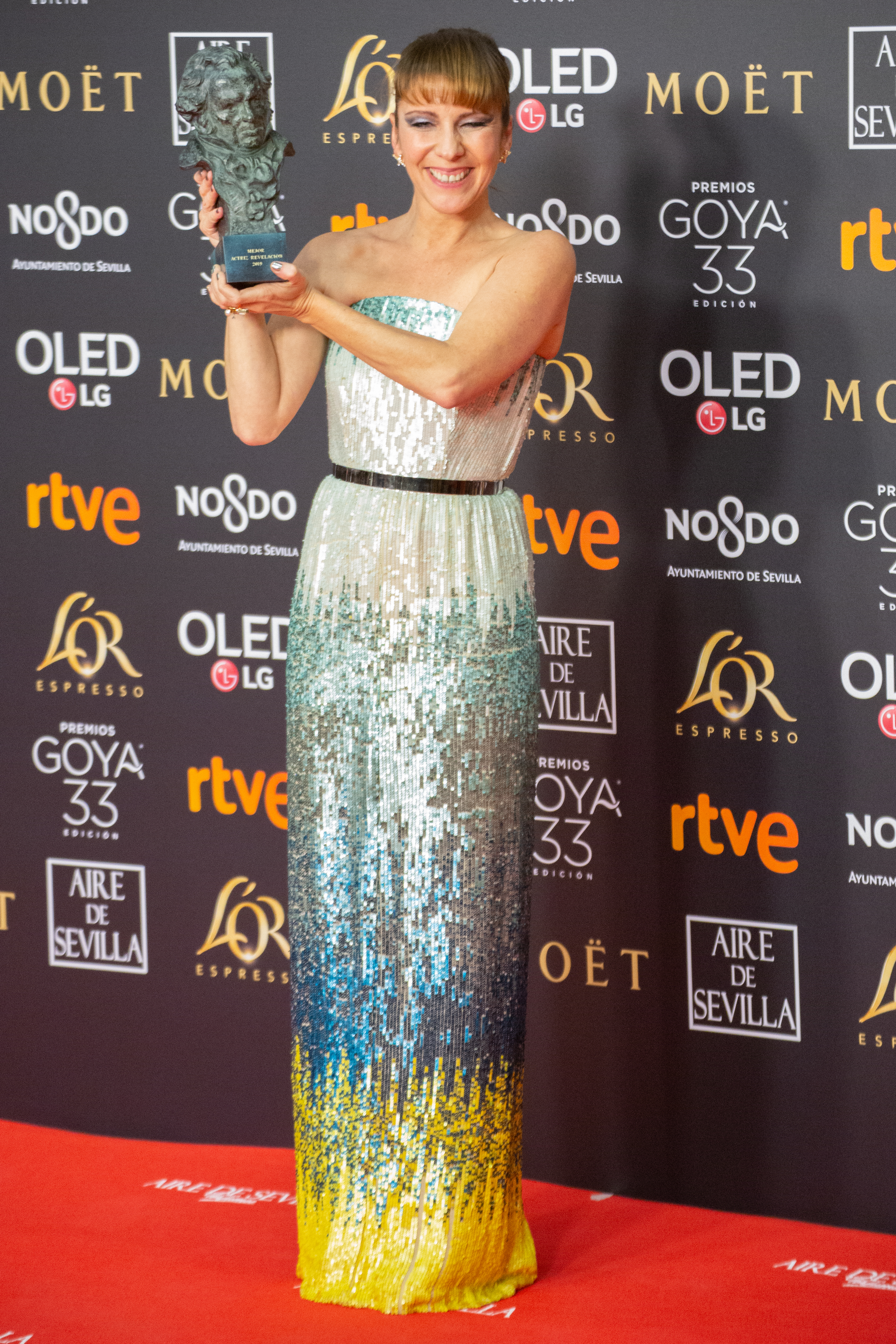
Eva Llorach won for her performance in Quién te cantará (2018).

Year	Actress	Role(s)	English title	Original title
2010 (25th)	Marina Comas ‡	Núria	Black Bread	Pa negre
2010 (25th)	Natasha Yarovenko	Natacha	Room in Rome	Habitación en Roma
2010 (25th)	Carolina Bang	Natalia	The Last Circus	Balada triste de trompeta
2010 (25th)	Aura Garrido	Mónica	Plans for Tomorrow	Planes para mañana
2011 (26th)	María León ‡	Pepita	The Sleeping Voice	La voz dormida
2011 (26th)	Alba García	Sara	Verbo	
2011 (26th)	Michelle Jenner	Silvia	Don't Be Afraid	No tengas miedo
2011 (26th)	Blanca Suárez	Norma Ledgard	The Skin I Live In	La piel que habito
2012 (27th)	Macarena García ‡	Carmen Villalta / Snow White	Snow White	Blancanieves
2012 (27th)	Carmina Barrios	Carmina	Carmina or Blow Up	Carmina o revienta
2012 (27th)	Estefanía de los Santos	La Caoba	Unit 7	Grupo 7
2012 (27th)	Cati Solivellas	Lola	The Wild Ones	Els nens salvatges
2013 (28th)	Natalia de Molina ‡	Belén	Living Is Easy with Eyes Closed	Vivir es fácil con los ojos cerrados
2013 (28th)	Belén López	Aledo	15 Years and One Day	15 años y un día
2013 (28th)	Olimpia Melinte	Alexandra / Nina	Cannibal	Caníbal
2013 (28th)	María Morales	Marga	All the Women	Todas las mujeres
2014 (29th)	Nerea Barros ‡	Rocío	Marshland	La isla mínima
2014 (29th)	Natalia Tena	Alex	10,000 km	10.000 km
2014 (29th)	Yolanda Ramos	Yoli	Carmina and Amen	Carmina y amén
2014 (29th)	Ingrid García Jonsson	Natalia	Beautiful Youth	Hermosa juventud
2015 (30th)	Irene Escolar ‡	June	An Autumn Without Berlin	Un otoño sin Berlín
2015 (30th)	Antonia Guzmán	Antonia	Nothing in Return	A cambio de nada
2015 (30th)	Iraia Elias	Amaia	When a Tree Falls	Amama
2015 (30th)	Yorkanda Ariosa	Magda	The King of Havana	El rey de La Habana
2016 (31st)	Anna Castillo ‡	Alma	The Olive Tree	El olivo
2016 (31st)	Belén Cuesta	Belén	Kiki, Love to Love	Kiki, el amor se hace
2016 (31st)	Ruth Díaz	Ana	The Fury of a Patient Man	Tarde para la ira
2016 (31st)	Sílvia Pérez Cruz	Sònia	At Your Doorstep	Cerca de tu casa
2017 (32nd)	Bruna Cusí ‡	Marga	Summer 1993	Estiu 1993
2017 (32nd)	Adriana Paz	Irene	The Motive	El autor
2017 (32nd)	Itziar Castro	Itziar	Skins	Pieles
2017 (32nd)	Sandra Escacena	Verónica	Verónica	
2018 (33rd)	Eva Llorach ‡	Violeta	Quién te cantará	
2018 (33rd)	Gloria Ramos	Collantes	Champions	Campeones
2018 (33rd)	Rosy Rodríguez	Carmen	Carmen & Lola	Carmen y Lola
2018 (33rd)	Zaira Romero	Lola	Carmen & Lola	Carmen y Lola
2019 (34th)	Benedicta Sánchez ‡	Benedicta	Fire Will Come	O que arde
2019 (34th)	Carmen Arrufat	Lis	The Innocence	La innocència
2019 (34th)	Pilar Gómez	Maravilla	Bye	Adiós
2019 (34th)	Ainhoa Santamaría	Enriqueta	While at War	Mientras dure la guerra

=== 2020s ===
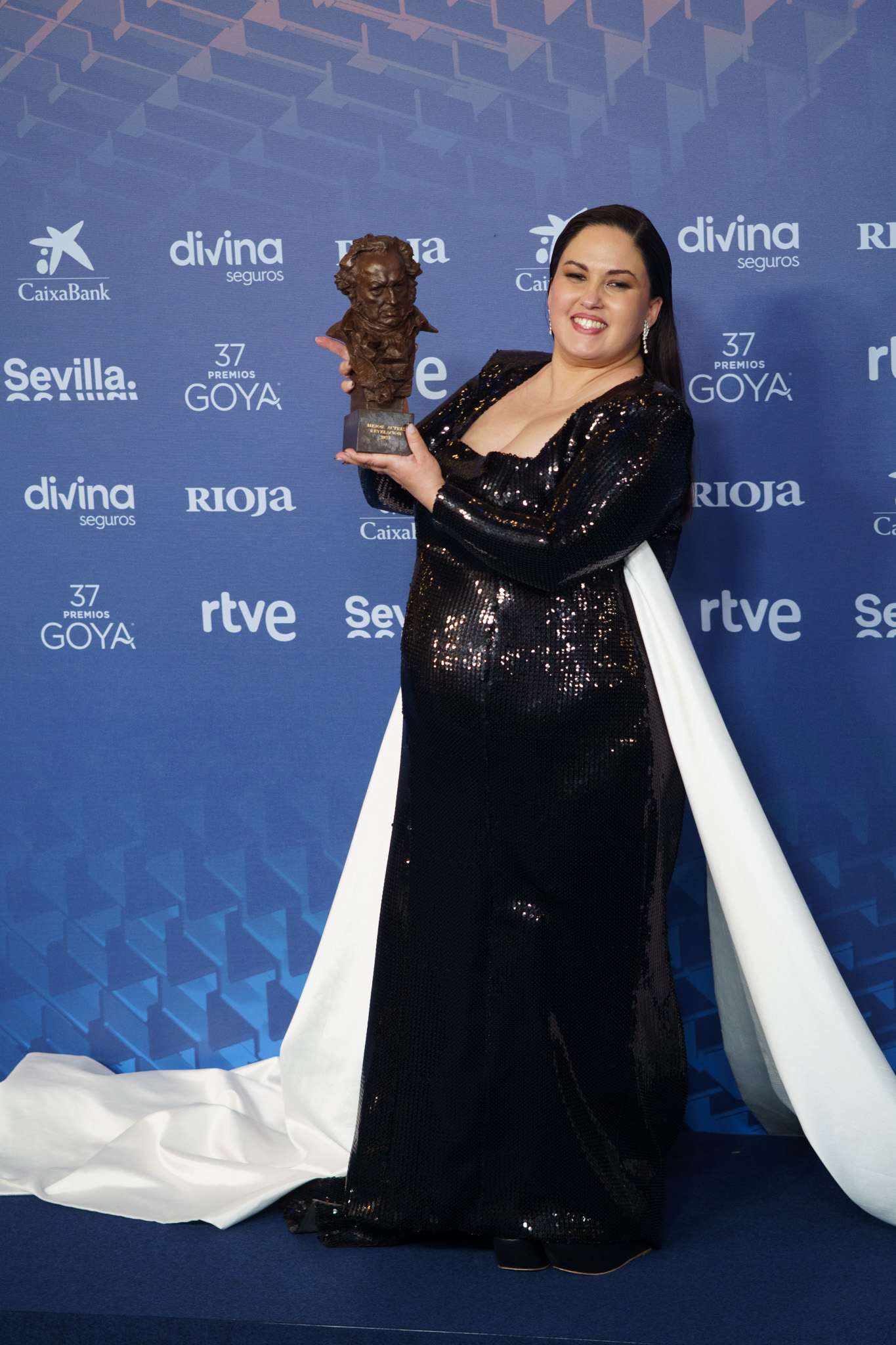
Laura Galán won for Piggy (2022).

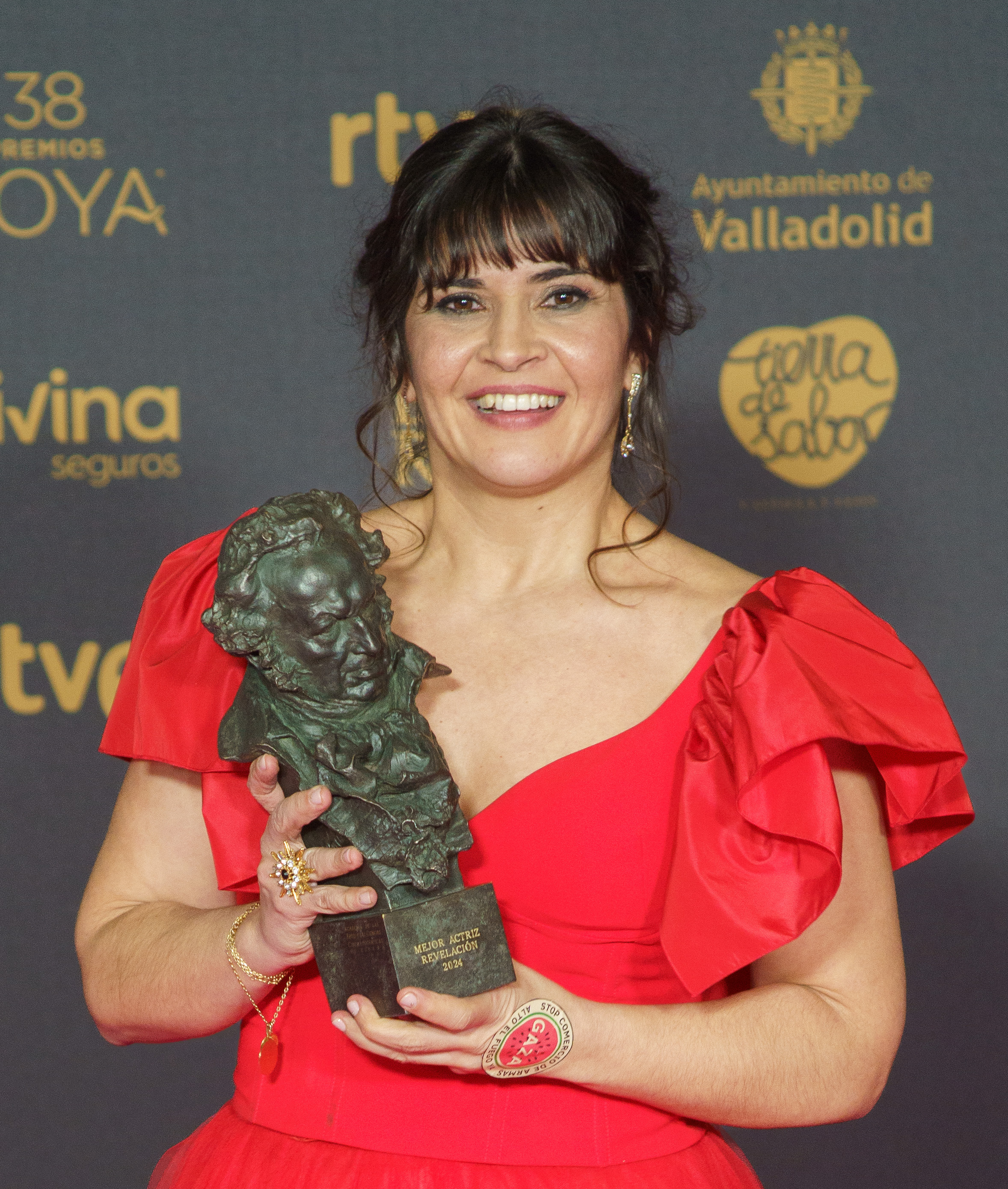
Janet Novás won for The Rye Horn (2023).

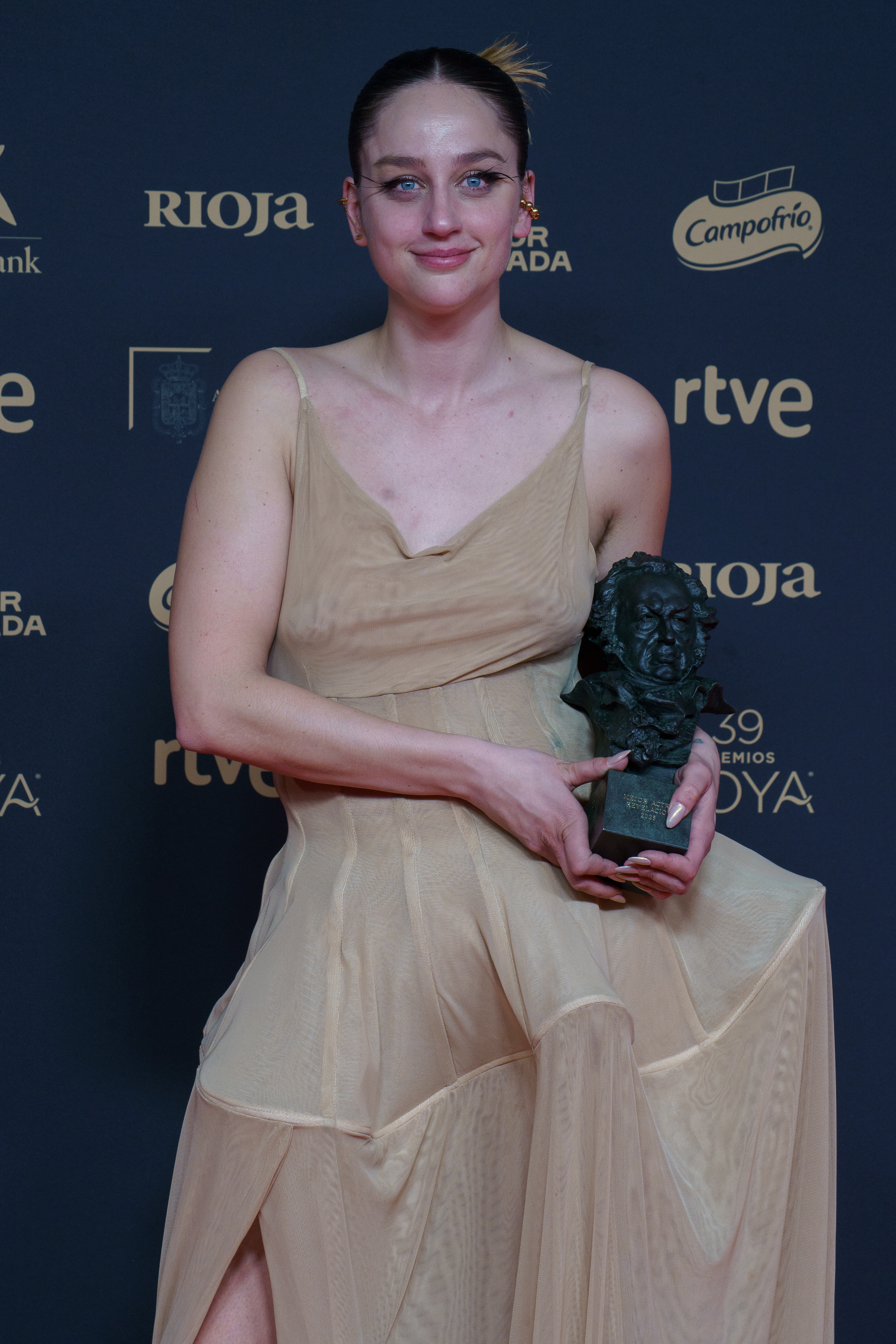
Laura Weissmahr won for Salve María (2024).

Year	Actress	Role(s)	English title	Original title
2020 (35th)	Jone Laspiur ‡	Ane	Ane Is Missing	Ane
2020 (35th)	Paula Usero	Lidia	Rosa's Wedding	La boda de Rosa
2020 (35th)	Milena Smit	Mila	Cross the Line	No matarás
2020 (35th)	Griselda Siciliani	Ana	The People Upstairs	Sentimental
2021 (36th)	María Cerezuela ‡	María	Maixabel	
2021 (36th)	Ángela Cervantes	Soraya	Girlfriends	Chavalas
2021 (36th)	Almudena Amor	Liliana	The Good Boss	El buen patrón
2021 (36th)	Nicolle García	Libertad	Libertad	
2022 (37th)	Laura Galán ‡	Sara	Piggy	Cerdita
2022 (37th)	Ana Otín	Dolors	Alcarràs	
2022 (37th)	Luna Pamies	Ana	The Water	El agua
2022 (37th)	Valèria Sorolla	Laura	The Rite of Spring	La consagración de la primavera
2022 (37th)	Zoe Stein	Diana	Manticore	Mantícora
2023 (38th)
2023 (38th)	Janet Novás ‡	María	The Rye Horn	O corno
2023 (38th)	Xinyi Ye	Claudia	Chinas, a Second Generation Story	Chinas
2023 (38th)	Yeju Ji	Shul	Chinas, a Second Generation Story	Chinas
2023 (38th)	Clàudia Malagelada	Mila	Creatura	
2023 (38th)	Sara Becker	María Margarita	The Movie Teller	La contadora de películas
2024 (39th)	Laura Weissmahr ‡	Maria Agirre	Salve Maria	
2024 (39th)	Zoe Bonafonte	Joana	The 47	El 47
2024 (39th)	Mariela Carabajal	Andrea Carabajal	The Blue Star	La estrella azul
2024 (39th)	Marina Guerola	Madalen	Glimmers	Los destellos
2024 (39th)	Lucía Veiga	Charo Velasco	I'm Nevenka	Soy Nevenka
2025 (40th)	Miriam Garlo ‡	Ángela	Deaf	Sorda
2025 (40th)	Nora Hernández	María	The Dinner	La cena
2025 (40th)	Blanca Soroa	Ainara	Sundays	Los domingos
2025 (40th)	Elvira Lara	Anabel	The Exiles	Los tortuga
2025 (40th)	Llúcia Garcia	Marina	Romería	
