= Janet Novás =

Galician dancer, choreographer and actress (born 1982)

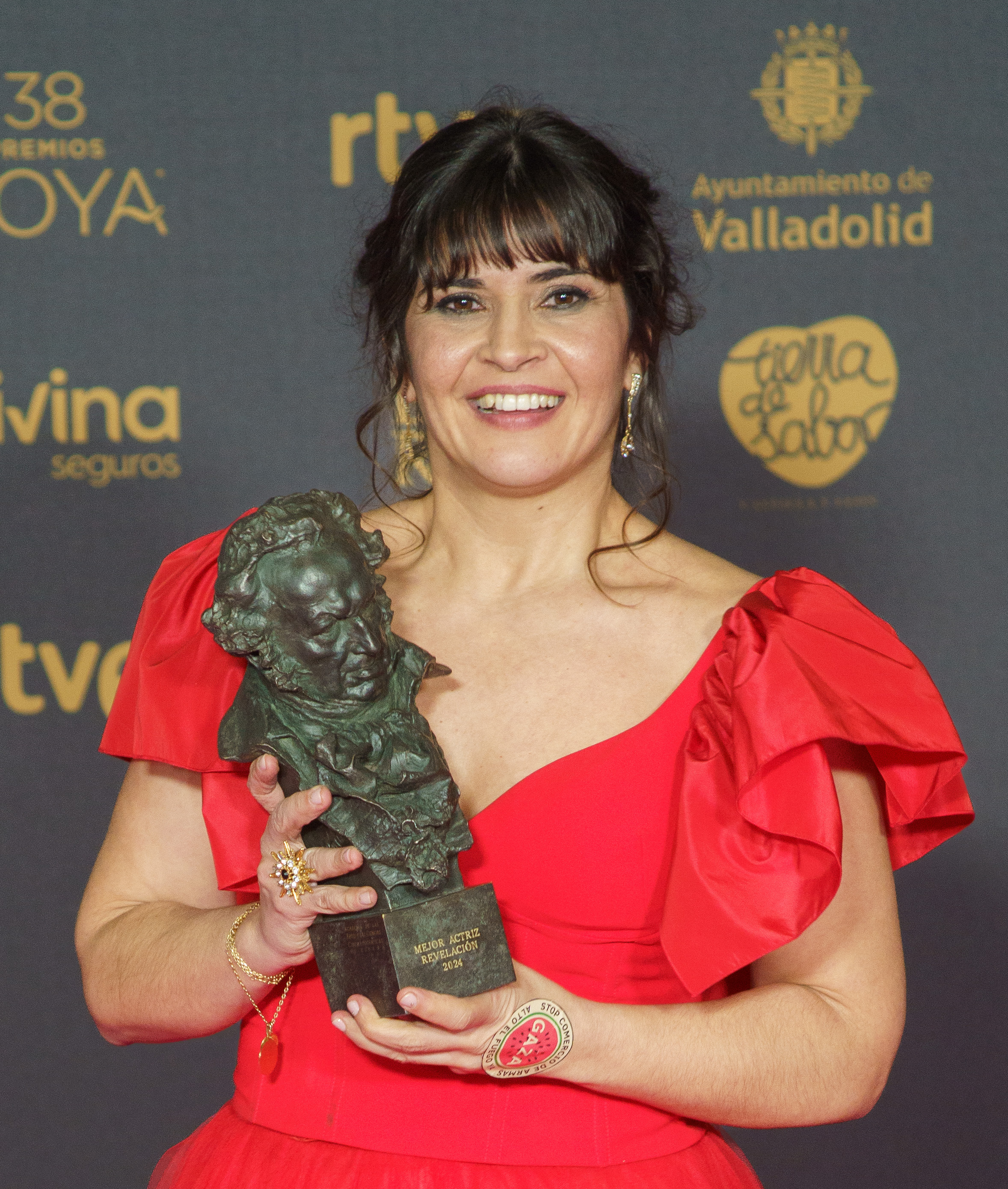
- Novás at the 2024 Goya Awards
- Born: 1982 (age 43–44); O Porriño, Pontevedra, Spain
- Occupations: Dancer; choreographer; actress
- Awards: Goya Award for Best New Actress (2024); National Dance Prize (2025)

Janet Novás (born 1982) is a Spanish dancer, choreographer and actress from Galicia. After some two decades in contemporary dance, during which she created solo pieces such as Cara pintada, Mercedes máis eu and Where is Janet?, she made her acting debut as the lead of Jaione Camborda's Galician-language film O corno (2023), winner of the Golden Shell at the San Sebastián International Film Festival, and won the Goya Award for Best New Actress in 2024; the following year she received Spain's National Dance Prize in the performance category.

== Early life and training ==
Novás was born in 1982 in O Porriño, in the Province of Pontevedra. She trained in contemporary dance in Madrid, Brussels and Berlin, and from 2008 began to create and develop her own projects, characterised by experimentation and self-research.

== Dance career ==
=== Early work and recognition ===
Novás won second prize at the 21st Madrid Choreographic Competition in 2007, and in 2008 received a danceWEB Europe scholarship in Vienna and the artistic assistance award at the B.Motion festival in Bassano del Grappa. In 2011 she won the InJuve Prize for her piece Cara pintada and was selected for the ChoreoRoam Europe workshop and residency programme, organised by The Place in London together with the Operaestate Festival, Dansateliers, the Danceweek Festival and the Madrid Choreographic Competition. As a choreographer she has directed the movement sections of the 2014 Max Awards gala and of the Mestre Mateo Awards gala, and she combines performing and creating with teaching, giving classes and workshops in centres across Spain, Europe, Latin America and Asia.

=== Choreographic works ===
Novás built her reputation on solo pieces that she performed almost always alone on stage. Among them are Cara pintada (2010), Who will save me today? (2013), the street piece Feelings (2015) and Si pudiera hablar de esto no haría esto (2016). In 2018 she created Mercedes máis eu together with the Galician composer and singer Mercedes Peón. Her piece Where is Janet?, which she described as arising from a state of exhaustion and a wish to work on healing and care, premiered in 2021 at the Plataforma festival in the Galician Centre for Contemporary Art in Santiago de Compostela, and was later shown at Dansa València and at the Festival de Otoño in Madrid.

Based in Barcelona since 2020, Novás developed the group work Proto (SN1806) as a resident artist at the Graner creation factory over two seasons. The piece was co-produced with the Xunta de Galicia through the Galician Choreographic Centre, the TNT Festival in Terrassa and the Auditorio de Tenerife.

=== Awards for her dance work ===
In 2021 Novás won the dance category of the El Ojo Crítico awards, given annually by Radio Nacional de España to artists under 40. Her name was announced alongside those of the theatre company El Patio Teatro, the illustrator Genie Espinosa, the tenor Xabier Anduaga and the actress Vicky Luengo.

On 2 October 2025 the Spanish Ministry of Culture announced that Novás had won the National Dance Prize in the performance category, an award granted through the National Institute of Performing Arts and Music and endowed with €30,000. The jury cited the technical excellence and magnetism of Si pudiera hablar de esto no haría esto, Mercedes máis eu and the final version of Where is Janet?, describing her as a dancer committed to contemporary languages who takes risks in every project and connects with audiences through honesty and emotional intensity. The prize in the creation category went the same year to Guillermo Weickert.

== Film career ==
=== O corno ===
Camborda cast Novás, who had no previous acting experience, as the lead of O corno after seeing her on stage; the director said she was drawn to the physical force Novás brought to the role and to her background in a rural, farming family in Galicia close to the Portuguese border. The film is set on A Illa de Arousa in 1971, during the final years of the Franco dictatorship, and follows María, a shellfish gatherer known in her village for the care with which she assists other women in childbirth, who is forced to flee across the border into Portugal after helping a young woman to end a pregnancy. O corno was the first film in Galician to compete in the official section at San Sebastián, and Camborda became the first Spanish woman director to win the festival's top award.

The film premiered in the Platform section of the Toronto International Film Festival before taking the Golden Shell at San Sebastián. Reviewing it for Cineuropa, Cristóbal Soage highlighted the ten-minute childbirth sequence that opens the film and wrote that its interest is sustained in large part by the work of Novás, who draws on her experience as a dancer to give the character a striking physical expressiveness. Writing in Variety, Jessica Kiang was more reserved about the film as a whole but described Novás's work as a committed, physical performance.

=== Awards for O corno ===
Novás won the Goya Award for Best New Actress at the 38th Goya Awards, held in Valladolid in February 2024, ahead of Clàudia Malagelada, Xinyi Ye, Yeju Ji and Sara Becker. She received the award from the vice-president of the Spanish Film Academy, Susi Sánchez, and opened her acceptance speech in Galician, thanking the cinemas that had shown O corno in that language and sharing the prize with the film's team. Alternating Spanish and Galician, she dedicated the award to her grandmothers, Carmen and Saladina, saying that they had been as wild and as wise as her character and that theirs was a knowledge that settles in the body and then walks, dances and sings.

She was also nominated for best leading actress at the 22nd Mestre Mateo Awards, presented by the Galician Audiovisual Academy at a ceremony held on 23 March 2024 at the Coliseum in A Coruña. The award went to María Vázquez for Matria, while O corno was the night's biggest winner with seven prizes, among them best feature film and best director and best screenplay for Camborda.

=== Later films ===
Novás joined the cast of Romería, the third feature by Carla Simón, which was shot in and around Vigo from August 2024 alongside Llúcia Garcia, Mitch Robles, Tristán Ulloa, Celine Tyll, Miryam Gallego, José Ángel Egido and Sara Casasnovas.

She also plays the mother of the young protagonist in La buena hija, the second feature by Júlia de Paz Solvas, adapted from de Paz's short film Harta and co-written with Nuria Dunjó, with Julián Villagrán as the father and Petra Martínez as the grandmother.
