= Benedicta Sánchez =

Spanish actress

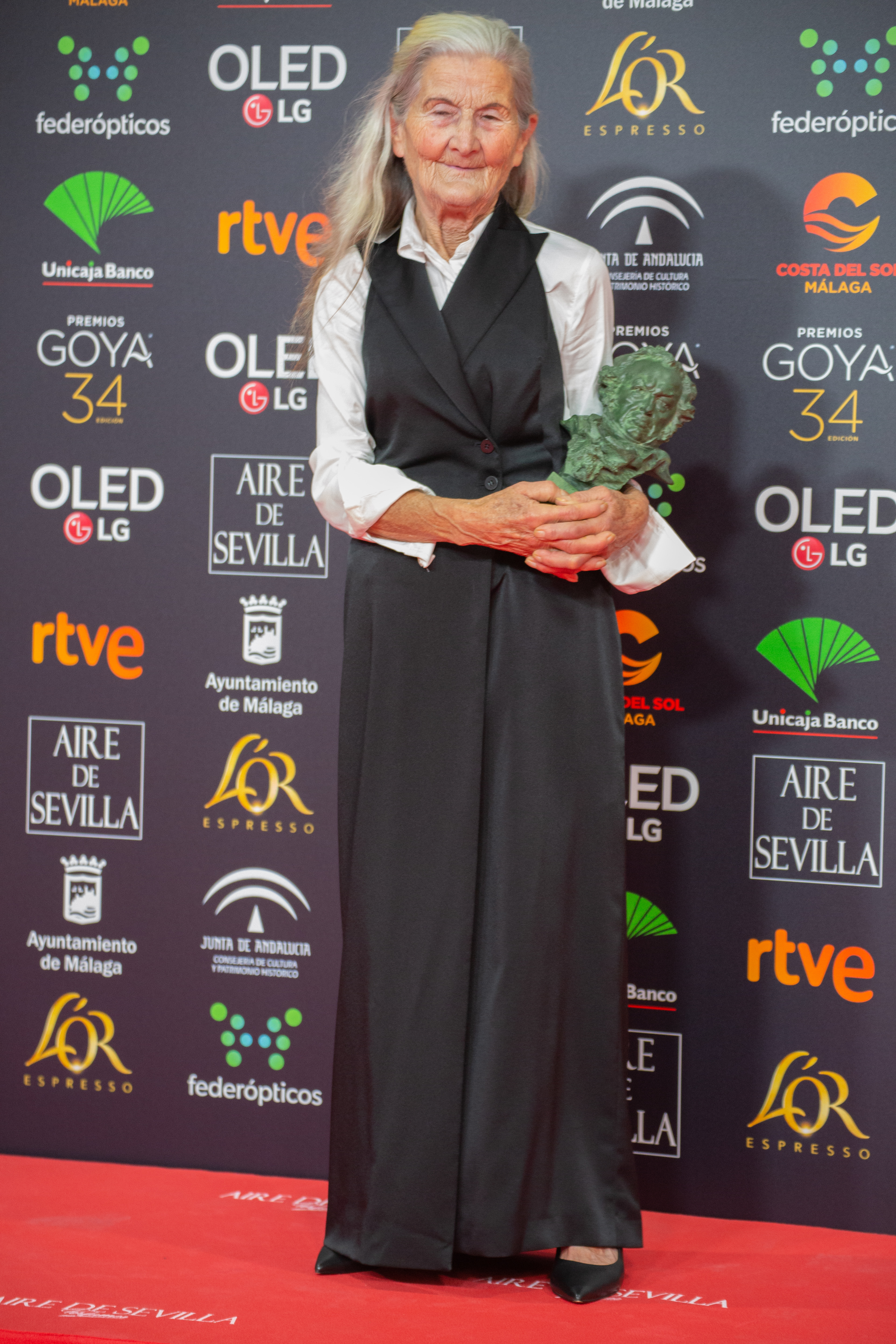
- Benedicta Sánchez in 2020
- Born: Benedicta Sánchez Vila; 24 October 1934 (age 91); San Fiz de Paradela, Spain
- Occupation: Actress
- Years active: 2019-present

Benedicta Sánchez Vila (born October 24, 1934, in San Fiz de Paradela, Lugo) is a Spanish photographer and actress.

== Biography ==
She married at the age of 17, and emigrated to Brazil with her husband. There she worked in a bar, as a bookseller at the Francisco Laissue bookstore in Rio de Janeiro and also as a photographer for 15 years, a profession she left in 1979. At the age of 17 she became a vegetarian at a time when it was not common to do so.

=== Acting career ===
In 2019 she debuted as an actress with a leading role in the film Lo que arde, by Óliver Laxe, a film that won at the Cannes Film Festival the Jury Prize in the Un certain regard.

In 2020, at the age of 84, she won the Goya Award for Best New Actress. She was the oldest actress to win the film award in this category, being the second oldest in the categories of female performers only surpassed by Julieta Serrano, who won her first Goya award at the age of 87 in the same edition.

=== Collaborations ===
She was the town crier of the 45th edition of the cheese festival of Arzúa, in the province of A Coruña. She was also in charge of giving the chimes of 2020 for TVG. In 2020 she was the protagonist of an advertising campaign for the fashion brand Adolfo Domínguez and of the Galicia volve campaign created by the Junta de Galicia to boost tourism in the region after the COVID-19 crisis.

== Acknowledgments ==
In 2019, Sánchez received the Castelao Medal, a recognition given by the Junta de Galicia and that in the 2019 edition was the first occasion in which all the awardees were women. Among them were the canoeist María Teresa Portela Rivas, the cardiologist and teacher Marisa Crespo Garrido, the delegate in Galicia of Stop Accidentes Jeanne Piccard and the Federation of Redeiras Artesás de Galicia O Peirao. That same year, she was one of the nominees for the CEC medal for best supporting actress, an award that Greta Fernández finally received. In addition, that same year it was announced that the day care center in O Corgo, the Galician town where Benedicta Sánchez lives, would be named in her honor.

In 2020, she was named comendadora of the cocido de Lalín. During the 52nd edition of the Feria del cocido de Lalín, a celebration recognized as a Festival of International Tourist Interest, in addition to Sánchez, the mayor of Madrid, José Luis Martínez-Almeida and Yosi Domínguez, the leader of the Spanish rock band Los Suaves, among others. In February 2020, the Provincial Council of Lugo recognized Sánchez's work in a tribute that took place in the Exhibition Hall of the Pazo de San Marcos.

In 2021, Sánchez was recognized during the 31st edition of the Galician of the Year Awards presented by El Correo Gallego.
