= Marta Robles =

Spanish journalist and writer

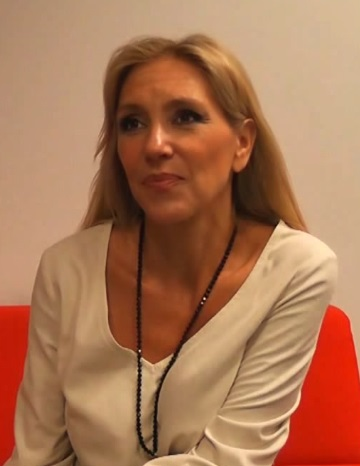
- Robles in October 2012
- Born: Marta Susana Robles Gutiérrez; 30 June 1963 (age 63); Madrid, Spain
- Education: Complutense University of Madrid
- Occupations: Journalist; writer
- Spouses: Ramón Langa (m. 1996; div. 1997); Luis Martín de Bustamante (m. 2002)
- Children: 3
- Awards: TP de Oro (1995); Antena de Oro (2000, 2011); Fernando Lara Novel Award (2013)
- Website: www.martarobles.es

Marta Susana Robles Gutiérrez (born 30 June 1963) is a Spanish journalist and writer.

== Radio ==
Marta Robles holds a degree in Information Sciences, Journalism branch, from the Complutense University of Madrid. Before graduating she began working at the magazine Tiempo in 1987. In 1989 she made the leap to the world of radio, presenting the program Caliente y frío on Radio Intercontinental, at the same time as her early work in television, where she started in 1988.

From there she went to Cadena SER, where she directed and presented an early-morning show entitled De la noche a la mañana. On the same station she hosted El Serial in 1993, with Javier Capitán and Luis Figuerola-Ferreti, and directed and presented Si amanece nos vamos from 1993 to 1994 and A vivir que son dos días from 1994 to 1996.

In 1998 she joined Onda Cero, where she directed and presented the afternoon program A toda radio until 2000. In 2001 she collaborated on Carlos Herrera's program Herrera en la onda.

From September 2008 to June 2010 Robles worked on the Punto Radio program Queremos hablar, presented by Ana García Lozano.

In 2011 she contributed to the program En Casa de Herrero on esRadio.

Since March 2013, she has directed and presented Entre Comillas, a magazine dedicated to the creation of Spanish literature, cinema, and music for EFE.

== Television ==
Robles' first opportunity in television was offered in 1988 by Canal 10, a satellite station created by José María Calviño, before the birth of private networks and that broadcast from London. There she worked alongside Mon Santiso and Daniel Écija, among others.

In October 1989, she returned to Madrid and began to work as coordinator, scriptwriter, and presenter of TVE's regional magazine for Castilla–La Mancha, that was then broadcast from the center in Paseo de la Habana.

When the center moved to Toledo, Marta Robles decided to try her luck on Telemadrid, a newly created regional station, on which she presented the program El Ruedo. She later directed and presented Verano en La Complutense, and then the cultural magazine A todo Madrid. Finally she presented the weekend edition of Telenoticias with Rafa Luque. She remained with that station until 1991.

In 1992 she became an editor on Telecinco's news programs, where she would also present on some occasions.

In 1993, Jesús Hermida signed her to his new Antena 3 program Con Hermida y Cía. A year later, she was called on to present A toda página (1994–1997), which collected news of social interest and events.

In April 1996, she presented the historical memory program Qué memoria la mía, directed by José María Íñigo, which only remained on the air for two weeks.

From October 1996 to January 1997, she presented and co-hosted the 9:00 pm edition of the news program Antena 3 Noticias (1996), replacing Pedro Piqueras.

In 1998, still on Antena 3, she presented the investigative program Contraportada, and then the network's international news. A year later, she led the magazine El tiempo pasa, corazón.

In 2002 Robles presented the current events program Equipo de Investigación on Onda 6, and also contributed assiduously to TVE's Esta es mi historia.

In 2004 she returned to Telemadrid to present the magazine Gran Vía de Madrid (2004–2005) and then Madrid a la última (2005–2011), a show about fashion, trends, and current events, which she also created and directed. In 2012 she presented and directed the daily magazine Ahora, Marta, also on Telemadrid.

From 2014 to 2017, she worked on the TVE program Amigas y conocidas. Currently, she contributes to Espejo público on Antena 3, El cascabel on 13TV, and ¿Cómo lo ves? on TVE. In 2018, she covered the wedding of Prince Harry and Meghan Markle for DKiss.

== Print media ==
Robles has contributed to publications such as Man, Woman, Panorama, Elle, Dunia, El Semanal XXL, the supplement of La Vanguardia, the magazine and website Wapa, and Guía del Ocio. She currently writes for the publications La Razón, La Gaceta de Salamanca, and Objetivo Bienestar.

From 2014 to 2015 she created, directed, and edited the online magazine Mass Bienestar.

== Books ==
- El mundo en mis manos (1991), with Pedro J. Ramírez, nonfiction
- La dama del PSOE (1992), with Almudena Bermejo, biography of Carmen Romero
- Los elegidos de la fortuna (1999), nonfiction
- Las once caras de María Lisboa (2001), fiction
- Parque Oceanográfico Universal de Valencia (2003), nonfiction
- Diario de una cuarentona embarazada (2008), fiction
- Don Juan (2008), collective fiction
- Madrid me Marta (2010), nonfiction
- Luisa y los espejos (2013), fiction
- Usted primero (2015), with Carmen Posadas, nonfiction
- Obscena. Antología de relatos pornocriminales (2016), collective fiction
- Haz lo que temas. (2016), nonfiction
- A menos de cinco centímetros (2017), fiction

== Awards ==
- 1995 Antena de Plata for radio for Si amanece nos vamos
- 1995 TP de Oro for Best Presenter for A toda página
- 1995 Woman de Oro
- 2000 Antena de Oro for A toda radio
- 2004 Condado de Noreña National Journalism Award
- 2005 Special Communication Award from the Madrid Association of Communication and Public Relations
- 2006 Antena de Plata for television for A la última
- 2006 Cosmopolitan TV Award
- 2011 Antena de Oro Premio extraordinario
- 2013 Fernando Lara Novel Award for Luisa y los espejos

== Private life ==
Marta Robles was married to actor Ramón Langa, father of her son Ramón, from 1996 to 1997. She is currently married to Luis Martín de Bustamante, father of her sons Miguel, known professionally as Mitch Robles, and Luis.
