= The Rye Horn =

- Film poster
- Galician: O corno
- Directed by: Jaione Camborda
- Written by: Jaione Camborda
- Produced by: Jaione Camborda; Andrea Vázquez; María Zamora
- Starring: Janet Novás; Siobhan Fernandes; Carla Rivas; Daniela Hernán Marchán; Julia Gómez; Nuria Lestegás; Diego Anido
- Cinematography: Rui Poças
- Edited by: Cristóbal Fernández
- Music by: Camilo Sanabria
- Production companies: Esnatu Zinema; Miramemira; Elastica Films; Bando à Parte; Bulletproof Cupid
- Distributed by: Elastica
- Release dates: 10 September 2023 (TIFF); 11 October 2023 (Spain)
- Running time: 105 minutes
- Countries: Spain; Portugal; Belgium
- Languages: Galician; Portuguese
- Box office: $497,073

The Rye Horn (Galician: O corno) is a 2023 drama film directed by Jaione Camborda which stars Janet Novás. A Spanish-Belgian-Portuguese co-production, it features dialogue in Galician and Portuguese.

The film landed its world premiere at the 2023 Toronto International Film Festival. It won the Golden Shell at the 71st San Sebastián International Film Festival.

== Plot ==
Set in 1971 Galicia, the plot tracks the plight of María, a woman who performs abortions in a village forced to leave the island of Arousa and cross the Portuguese border through smuggling routes.

== Cast ==
- Janet Novás
- Siobhan Fernandes
- Carla Rivas
- Daniela Hernán Marchán
- Julia Gómez
- Nuria Lestegás
- Diego Anido

== Production ==
The Rye Horn is a Spanish-Portuguese-Belgian international co-production. It was produced by Esnatu Zinema, Miramemira and Elastica Films alongside Bando à Parte and Bulletproof Cupid, with the participation of TVE, TVG, Movistar Plus+, backing from ICAA, Eurimages, and AGADIC.

== Release ==
The Rye Horn was selected in the Platform Prize slate of the 48th Toronto International Film Festival, with a screening premiere set for 10 September 2023. It also made it to the official selection of the 71st San Sebastián International Film Festival for its European premiere, and to the 'Debate' programme of the 2023 BFI London Film Festival. Distributed by Elastica, it was released theatrically in Spain on 11 October 2023.

== Reception ==
=== Top ten lists ===
The film also appeared on a number of critics' top ten lists of the best Spanish films of 2023:

- 5th — El Cultural (critics)

=== Accolades ===
Award	Date	Category	Recipient	Result	Ref.
San Sebastián International Film Festival	30 September 2023	Golden Shell	The Rye Horn	Won	
Feroz Awards	26 January 2024	'Arrebato' Special Award (Fiction)	The Rye Horn	Nominated	
Goya Awards	10 February 2024	Best New Actress	Janet Novás	Won	
Mestre Mateo Awards	23 March 2024	Best Film	The Rye Horn	Won	
Mestre Mateo Awards	23 March 2024	Best Director	Jaione Camborda	Won	
Mestre Mateo Awards	23 March 2024	Best Screenplay	Jaione Camborda	Won	
Mestre Mateo Awards	23 March 2024	Best Actress	Janet Novás	Nominated	
Mestre Mateo Awards	23 March 2024	Best Supporting Actress	Carla Rivas	Nominated	
Mestre Mateo Awards	23 March 2024	Best Supporting Actor	Diego Anido	Nominated	
Mestre Mateo Awards	23 March 2024	Best Cinematography	Rui Poças	Nominated	
Mestre Mateo Awards	23 March 2024	Best Editing	Cristobal Fernández	Nominated	
Mestre Mateo Awards	23 March 2024	Best Production Supervision	José Alberto Fuentes	Nominated	
Mestre Mateo Awards	23 March 2024	Best Art Direction	Melania Freire	Won	
Mestre Mateo Awards	23 March 2024	Best Sound	Sergio Silva, David Machado	Won	
Mestre Mateo Awards	23 March 2024	Best Original Score	Camilo Sanabria	Nominated	
Mestre Mateo Awards	23 March 2024	Best Costume Design	Uxía Vaello	Won	
Mestre Mateo Awards	23 March 2024	Best Makeup and Hairstyles	Bárbara Brouke, Lorena Calvo, Silvia Neira	Won	

== See also ==
- List of Spanish films of 2023
