= Castelao Medal =

Civil distinction awarded in Galicia, Spain

Medalla de Castelao
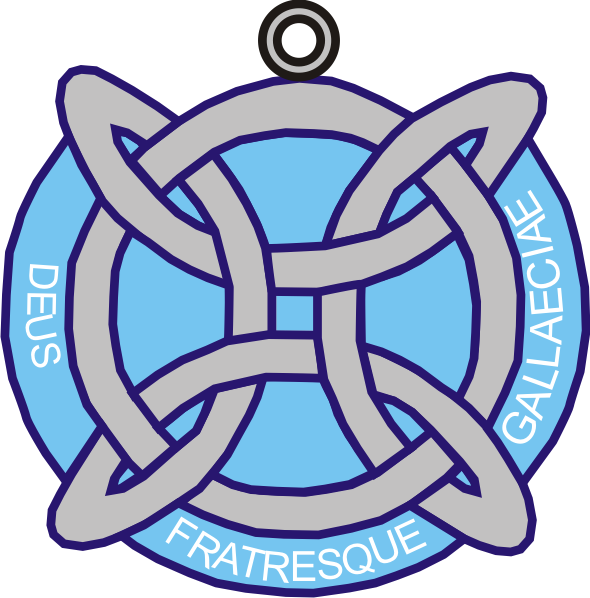
- The Castelao Medal is modeled after one of his designs.
- Awarded for: having "made contributions in different fields and taken the name of Galicia beyond its borders in ways similar to Castelao"
- Location: Santiago de Compostela
- Country: Spain
- Presented by: Xunta de Galicia
- First award: 1984

The Castelao Medal (Galician: Medalla Castelao), established in 1984, is one of the highest civil distinctions awarded in Galicia, surpassed only by the Medalla de Galicia. The award is presented by the Xunta de Galicia to honour the people and institutions that have created exceptional works in the arts, culture, literature, science, or in any other field that is worthy of distinction. The award can be bestowed upon Galicians whether they reside in Galicia or abroad. The medal was created and named in honour of writer and politician Alfonso Daniel Rodríguez Castelao.

== History ==
The award was conceived in 1984 and is presented annually on 28 June. The date coincides with the return of the remains of writer and politician Alfonso Daniel Rodríguez Castelao from Argentina to Galicia in 1984, which were buried in the Panteón de Galegos Ilustres (Panthenon of Distinguished Galicians), in Santiago de Compostela. The Castelao Medals are given to a different number of people each year. It is stipulated that the award cannot be given posthumously.

== Medal description ==
The Medal measures 50 by 36 mm (2.0 by 1.4 in). On the front is a cross designed by Castelao, which is inspired by the monumental stone crucifixes found in Galicia. On a blue background, the motto reads Deus fratresque Gallaeciae (English: God, Brothers and Galicia). The name of the recipient of the award and the date are inscribed on the back. The medal hangs on entwined chains of white and blue, the national colours of Galicia.

== Recipients ==
=== Partial list of laureates ===
==== 2019 ====
- Benedicta Sánchez, Jeanne Picard, Marisa Crespo, Teresa Portela and the Galician professional collective of netmakers.

==== 2020 ====
- A Roda, Xosé Manuel Piñeiro, Ana Peleteiro, Pilar Cernuda and Asociación de Amigos do Camiño de Santiago.

==== 2021 ====
- Santiago Péman, Esther Eiros, Manuel Vila, Xoán Luis Saco Cid and the Centro Superior de Hostelería de Galicia.

==== 2022 ====
- Javier Sánchez de Dios, Camilo Nogueira Román, Javier Olleros, CD Burela FS and El Eco de A Coruña.

==== 2023 ====
- Ledicia Costas, Siniestro Total, Lino de Prado, Susana Gacio and Rafael López López.

== See also ==
- List of European art awards
