= Mimosas (film) =

- Film poster
- Directed by: Oliver Laxe
- Written by: Oliver Laxe; Santiago Fillol
- Produced by: Felipe Lage Coro; Lamia Chraibi; Nadia Turincev
- Starring: Ahmed Hammoud; Shakib Ben Omar; Said Aagli
- Cinematography: Mauro Herce
- Edited by: Cristóbal Fernández
- Production companies: Zeitun Films; La Prod; Rouge International
- Distributed by: UFO Distribution (France); NUMAX Distribución (Spain)
- Release dates: 16 May 2016 (Cannes); 24 August 2016 (France); 5 January 2017 (Spain)
- Running time: 96 minutes
- Countries: Spain; Morocco; France; Qatar
- Languages: Arabic; Galician

Mimosas is a 2016 drama film directed and co-written by Oliver Laxe, described by Laxe as 'a Religious Western'. The film is a co-production between Spain, Morocco, France and Qatar. It was screened in the Critics' Week section at the 2016 Cannes Film Festival where it won the Nespresso Grand Prize.

The film shares some footage with Ben Rivers's The Sky Trembles and the Earth is Afraid and the Two Eyes Are Not Brothers and an installation by Artangel that accompanied it: Rivers's film portrays a high-handed Western film-maker working in North Africa, and uses footage of the making of Mimosas. In the assessment of Jonathan Romney, 'this is partly a consummate figures-in-a-landscape study, with characters – and their accompanying mules – often merging into the vastness of a varied, but usually profoundly inhospitable landscape. But the cast makes striking use of non-professionals, and Laxe has an unerring eye for faces that tell a story.'

== Summary ==
The film is divided into three sections, named after different prayer positions from the Islamic rakat. Its pace is meditative, with little dialogue or music. It seems to portray two different worlds, implicitly of different temporalities: one characterised by modern dress, battered cars, electricity pylons, and urban life ('perhaps present-day Skoura'); and one characterised by traditional clothing, travel by foot and mules, camp fires and wilderness.

In the modern setting, Shakib is characterised as a young, abstracted man, noted for his knowledge of spirituality, who appears to be a mechanic. He is chosen by his boss to ensure a sheikh's successful journey look after one Ahmed, and driven into the desert, towards the Atlas Mountains.

In the other setting, a small caravan led by an aged sheikh is travelling towards the ancient (and now ruined) city of Sijilmasa. He seeks to reach his family so that he can die among his loved ones. With the caravan are two wanderers, Ahmed and Saïd, who are initially hoping to rob the caravan. Despite the misgivings of his companions, the sheikh insists on travelling through the mountains in order to shorten their journey. However, he dies in the mountains. For payment, Ahmed and Saïd offer to take his body for inhumation in Sijilmasa while the rest of the caravan turn back. It is at this point that Shakib appears and joins them. Ahmed secretly frees the mule carrying the sheikh's body, hoping to spare himself the journey, but Shakib insists they find it, and gradually the group develops a growing commitment to their purpose. Finding the mule with two more odd travellers, the elderly Mohammed and his mute daughter Ikram, they proceed, and Shakib tries to coax Ahmed into finding inner leadership skills.

They enter bandit country, are attacked, and Mohammed is killed. Shakib struggles in his role as spiritual mentor, more than once telling Ahmed 'If you do well, I will do better!' Later, Ahmed tries to abandon the journey, and while the group is fragmented, Saïd and Ikram are attacked: Saïd is killed and Ikram abducted. At this point the film flits increasingly between its two temporalities: it appears that in the modern setting, Ahmed is a junkie, and conceivably that events are in his imagination. Shakib, now mounted and armed with a sword, takes Ahmed on a mission to rescue Ikram, whom we see being tortured to death. The film ends with the two men charging into the bandit camp.

== Cast ==
- Ahmed Hammoud as Ahmed
- Shakib Ben Omar as Shakib
- Said Aagli as Saïd
- Ikram Anzouli as Ikram
- Ahmed El Othemani as Mohammed
- Hamid Fardjad as Sheikh
- Margarita Albores as Noor
- Abdelatif Hwidar as Guide
