= Fire Will Come =

2019 film

- Theatrical release poster
- Galician: O que arde
- Directed by: Óliver Laxe
- Written by: Óliver Laxe; Santiago Fillol
- Produced by: Mani Mortazavi; Andrea Queralt
- Starring: Amador Arias; Benedicta Sánchez
- Cinematography: Mauro Herce
- Edited by: Cristóbal Fernández
- Production companies: 4 A 4 Productions; Kowalski Films; Miramemira; Tarantula Luxembourg
- Distributed by: Pyramide Distribution
- Release date: 21 May 2019 (Cannes)
- Running time: 85 minutes
- Countries: Spain; France; Luxembourg
- Language: Galician
- Box office: $715,757

Fire Will Come (Galician: O que arde) is a 2019 Galician-language drama film directed by Óliver Laxe. Filmed in the Serra dos Ancares area of Galicia, many of the cast were local people and not professional actors.

== Plot ==
The story takes place in the Serra dos Ancares mountain range in the Galician province of Lugo, in north west Spain. It tells the story of Amador Coro, who has recently been released from prison after a conviction for arson – he had started a fire in the thick forests that cover the local mountains. Returning to live with his mother Benedicta in her farm house, he lives an uneventful life, tending his mother's cows and avoiding unnecessary contact with other people. However, when a large forest fire devastates the area, tensions against him appear due to his arson conviction.

== Cast ==
- Amador Arias Mon as Amador Coro
- Benedicta Sánchez as Benedicta, Amador's Mother
- Inazio Brao as Inazio
- Nuria Sotelo as Nuria
- Rubén Gómez Coelho as Ruben
- Iván Yáñez as Ivan
- Luis Manuel Guerrero Sánchez as Luis Manuel
- Luna as German Shepherd dog

== Reception ==
=== Critical response ===
Fire Will Come has an approval rating of 90% on review aggregator website Rotten Tomatoes, based on 59 reviews, and an average rating of 7.6/10. The website's critical consensus states: "Deliberately paced yet richly rewarding, Fire Will Come slowly but surely draws the viewer into its unsettling grasp". Metacritic assigned the film a weighted average score of 73 out of 100, based on 12 critics, indicating "generally favorable reviews".

=== Accolades ===
The film was screened in the Un Certain Regard section at the 2019 Cannes Film Festival, where it won the Jury Prize. The film competed at the 34th Mar del Plata International Film Festival, the most prestigious film festival in Latin America, where it won the Golden Astor for Best Film.

In 2019, Benedicta Sánchez was awarded the Castelao Medal by the President of the Regional Government of Galicia for her performance as the mother. The medal is awarded to those who promote Galician culture.

Year	Award	Category	Nominee(s)	Result	Ref.
2020	34th Goya Awards	Best Film		Nominated	
2020	34th Goya Awards	Best Director	Oliver Laxe	Nominated	
2020	34th Goya Awards	Best New Actress	Benedicta Sánchez	Won	
2020	34th Goya Awards	Best Cinematography	Mauro Herce	Won	
