= Romería (film) =

2025 film by Carla Simón

- Spanish theatrical release poster
- Directed by: Carla Simón
- Written by: Carla Simón
- Produced by: María Zamora
- Starring: Llúcia Garcia; Mitch; Tristán Ulloa; Miryam Gallego; Sara Casasnovas; Alberto Gracia; Marina Troncoso; José Ángel Egido; Janet Novás; Celine Tyll
- Cinematography: Hélène Louvart
- Edited by: Sergio Jiménez; Ana Pfaff
- Music by: Ernest Pipó
- Production companies: Elastica; Ventall Cinema; Dos Soles Media; Romería Vigo AIE
- Distributed by: Elastica Films (Spain); Piffl Medien (Germany)
- Release dates: 21 May 2025 (Cannes); 5 September 2025 (Spain); 2 April 2026 (Germany)
- Running time: 112 minutes
- Countries: Spain; Germany
- Languages: Spanish; Catalan; Galician; French
- Budget: €3.2 million
- Box office: $3 million

Romería is a 2025 drama film written and directed by Carla Simón. It stars Llúcia Garcia as Marina, a young woman seeking the truth about her deceased biological father. The plot consists of a fictionalized account of Simón's own experiences.

The film premiered at the 78th Cannes Film Festival on 21 May 2025, where it competed for the Palme D'Or. It received positive reviews from critics. It was theatrically released in Spain by Elastica Films on 5 September 2025.

== Plot ==
In 2004, Marina Piñeiro, an 18-year-old orphan, attempts to apply for a scholarship to study film at university, but is told that she must have herself recognised on her father's death certificate, from which her name is missing. Marina is told that this can only be corrected through an attestation from her paternal grandparents before a notary. Marina travels to Vigo for five days in order to rectify the certificate and, at the same time, meet her paternal family for the first time. Upon arrival, Marina is welcomed by her uncle Lois, with whom she stays on his houseboat along with his wife Denise and their sons Nuno, Basilio, and Eugene. Marina takes a liking to Nuno, who is a similar age to her.

During her stay, Marina asks about where her parents lived. Lois tells her that they resided in an apartment in Playa Samil, but Marina insists they lived in Toralla, a version later confirmed by her uncle Iago and Marina's mother's diary, which she carries with her on the trip. Throughout the days, the family constantly remarks on the striking physical resemblance between Marina and her mother.

Marina visits her aunt Olalla, who makes her a red dress in her boutique before going to the beach with her aunt Virxinia. As the rest of the family learns of her arrival, awkward situations arise, such as when some young cousins tell Marina that Olalla warned them not to touch her, claiming “she is sick because of her blood”. Meanwhile, Marina grows closer to Iago, a figure the family views with disappointment, as he reminds them of Marina's father. Tension rises during a visit to aunt Xulia's cabin, where Xulia reveals that Marina’s father died in 1992, contradicting the version Marina had believed for years, that he had died in 1987 when she was just a baby.

When the family visits the grandparents, Marina is greeted coldly by her grandmother, while her grandfather gives her an envelope with money to support her future film career. Marina insists she would prefer a scholarship to the money, but ultimately accepts it. Marina is disappointed to learn from Nuno that her grandparents kept her father isolated and socially distant from the time he contracted AIDS until the day he died.

That night, Marina and Nuno escape from the houseboat. Marina leaves the envelope at the entrance of the grandparents' house and throws old leaves into their swimming pool. They then attend the Fiestas de Vigo, where Marina meets Iago at a bar. There, Iago explains that her father did not raise her not because he did not want to, but because he could not, due to his heroin addiction, and that he decided to stay away before the situation worsened. Marina walks alone through the streets of Vigo and follows a cat until she reaches the port, where she enters a rowboat.

In a dream-like sequence, Marina is transported back to 1983, and takes the rowboat to Toralla. Marina meets her parents on the rooftop of the building where they lived together. Her mother's voice narrates her story through fragments of her diary, written in Catalan, in which she is seen with Marina's father traveling by boat, playing naked on the beach, attending the Fiestas de Vigo, and consuming drugs. Their relationship ends abruptly in 1986 after they both run out of money and also suffer severe heroin withdrawal, forcing Marina's mother to leave Vigo while pregnant with her.

Back in the present, Marina reunites with her grandparents to correct the documentation, proving that she is her father's daughter and enabling her to apply for a scholarship to study film in Barcelona. At that moment, Marina is told by her grandmother how she resembles her father as she watches her gazing at the sea from a window. That afternoon, Marina sails on Lois's boat with him and his family, where they encounter dolphins, which Marina films with the video camera she used to document her entire trip to Vigo.

== Cast ==
- Llúcia Garcia as Marina / Mother
- Mitch Robles as Nuno / Father
- Tristán Ulloa as Lois
- Celine Tyll as Denise
- León Romagosa as Basilio
- Hans Romagosa as Eugene
- Marina Troncoso as abuela ('grandmother')
- José Ángel Egido as abuelo ('grandfather')
- Miryam Gallego as Olalla
- Sara Casasnovas as Virxinia
- Toño Casais as Ramón
- Lia Mora as Carlota
- Helena González as Sabela
- Gala Rodríguez as Antía
- Antón Lemos as Quique
- Laura Nuñez as Uxía
- Alberto Gracia as Iago
- Janet Novás as Xulia

== Production ==
Partially inspired by Simón's own life, Romería is a fictionalized retelling of the story of how her parents met and fell in love in Vigo. It also portrays the beginning of their addiction to drugs, with teen protagonist Marina conforming a sort of alter ego of Simón.

The film is an Elastica Films co-production with Ventall Cinema, Dos Soles Media, and Romería Vigo AIE. It received funding from ICAA, ICEC, Xunta de Galicia, Eurimages, Creative Europe MEDIA, FFA, the Madrid regional administration, RTVE, Vodafone, Movistar Plus+, Netflix, 3Cat, ZDF/ARTE, and The Post Republic. It had a budget of around €3.2 million.

Filming began in the summer of 2024 in Vigo. The old centre of Vigo and the Praza de Almeida was used for a scene set during the 2004 Festas do Carmen. It was shot in Spanish, Catalan, Galician, and French.

== Release ==
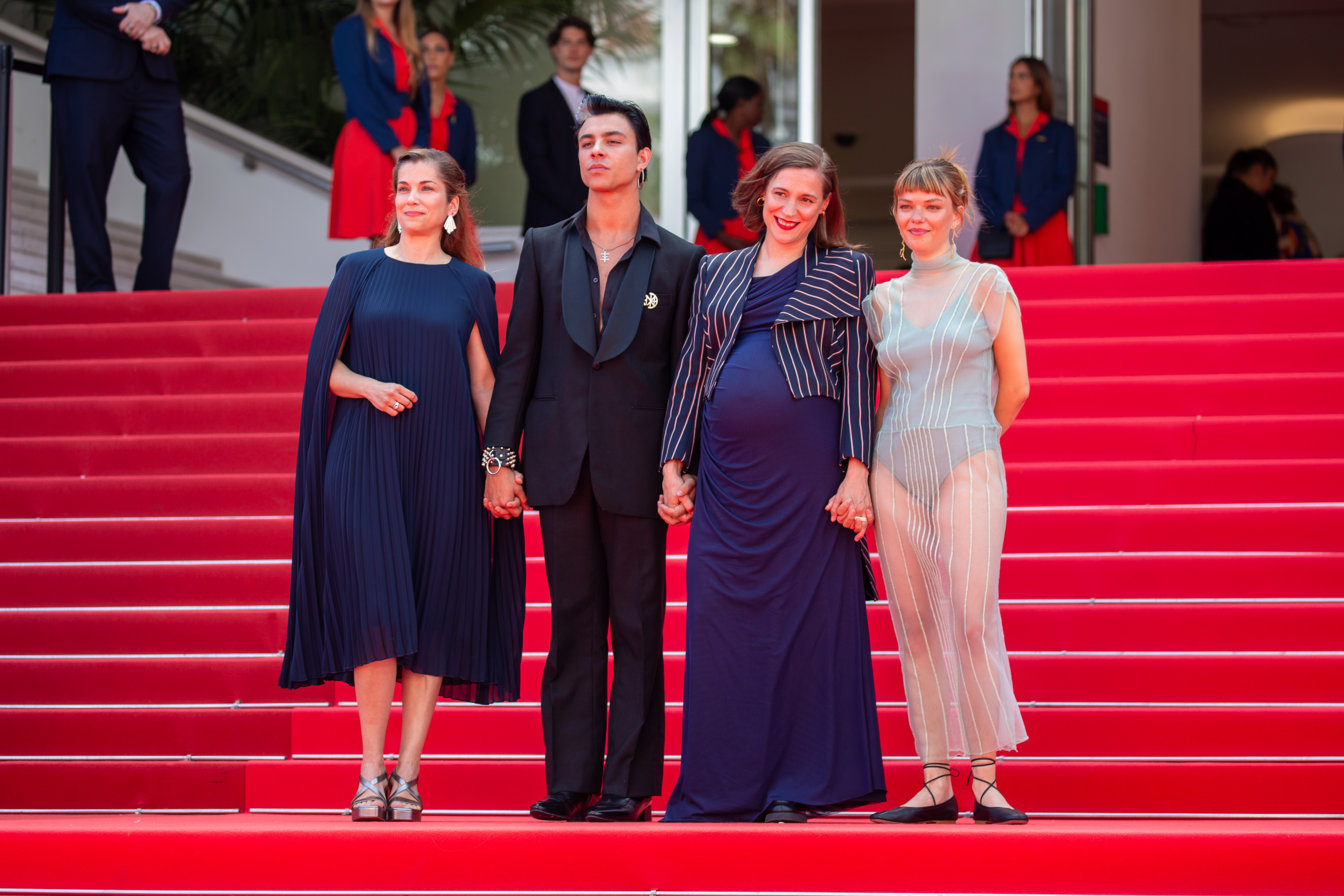
María Zamora, Mitch, Carla Simón, and Llúcia Garcia during the 2025 Cannes Film Festival

Prior to the start of production, the film was tentatively planned to be released in 2025. Selected in the competitive slate of the 2025 Cannes Film Festival, the film premiered on 21 May 2025 at the Grand Thèâtre Lumiére. Romería received a pre-screening at the Mar de Vigo Auditorium on 26 August 2025, ahead of its Spanish theatrical release by Elastica on 5 September 2025. mk2 Films acquired international sales rights. The film's festival run also included selections for screenings in the competitive slate of the 72nd Sydney Film Festival, in the 'Kinoscope' programme of the 31st Sarajevo Film Festival, in the 'Icons' section of the 30th Busan International Film Festival, in the main slate of the 63rd New York Film Festival (for its North-American premiere), and in the 'Love' strand of the 2025 BFI London Film Festival.

Piffl Medien acquired German distribution rights. The German theatrical release date was scheduled for 2 April 2026. Ad Vitam released theatrically the film in France on 8 April 2026.

The film was also sold in the United Kingdom and Ireland (Curzon), the Benelux (Cherry Pickers Film Distribution), Italy (I Wonder Pictures), Sweden (Folkets Bio), Denmark (Filmbazar), Norway (Arthaus), Finland (Cinemanse), Switzerland (Cineworx), Greece (Weirdwave), Portugal (Alambique), the Baltic countries (Kino Pavasaris), Poland (New Horizons), Hungary (Vertigo), former Yugoslavia (MCF), Romania (Bad Unicorn), Bulgaria (Beta), Australia and New Zealand (Palace), Japan (Gnome), South Korea (M&M International), Taiwan (Swallow Wings), Indonesia (Falcon), Latin America (Impacto), and North America (Janus Films).

== Reception ==
=== Critical response ===
On the review aggregator website Rotten Tomatoes, 92% of 88 critics' reviews are positive, with an average rating of 7.7/10. The website's consensus reads: "Romería unfolds as a quietly observed, beautifully acted family study, where director Carla Simón's delicate sense of place and Llúcia Garcia's luminous presence combine to create a quietly powerful film." Metacritic, which uses a weighted average, assigned the film a score of 77 out of 100, based on 19 critics, indicating "generally favorable" reviews.

Marc van de Klashorst of the International Cinephile Society rated the film 4½ out of 5 stars, assessing that "it is Simón's one move away from realism that turns Romería into her best film to date." Wendy Ide of ScreenDaily wrote that Simón demonstrates again a "rare gift for capturing the unpredictable, mercurial beast that is the family". Peter Bradshaw of The Guardian rated Romería 4 out of 5 stars, billing it as a "distinctive, intelligent, sympathetic drama".

David Rooney of The Hollywood Reporter determined the film to be "more visually beguiling than intimately involving". Manu Yáñez of Fotogramas rated Romería four out of five stars, pointing out that should the film be Simón's best is because of "the small miracles emerging from her impure approach to fiction". Philipp Engel of Cinemanía rated the film 4½ out of 5 stars, writing that the feeling that remains after watching the film is that the rational and sensible Simón "has let loose to indulge in the most pleasurable poetic escapades". Carlos Boyero of El País billed Romería as a film that he respects, but what does not really grab him, singling out Llúcia Garcia's presence as the thing he liked the most about it.

Glenn Kenny of RogerEbert.com rated the film 3½ out of 4 stars, deeming it to be a "splendid, sometimes languorous, sometimes heartbreaking picture". Stephanie Zacharek of Time considered that the film possesses a "quiet, restorative power".

=== Accolades ===
In September 2025, the Academy of Cinematographic Arts and Sciences of Spain included the film within the shortlist of three candidate films to represent Spain in the Best International Film category of the 98th Academy Awards.

Award	Date of ceremony	Category	Recipient(s)	Result	Ref.
Cannes Film Festival	24 May 2025	Palme d'Or	Carla Simón	Nominated	
Sydney Film Festival	15 June 2025	Sydney Film Prize	Romería	Nominated	
Feroz Awards	24 January 2026	Best Drama Film	Romería	Nominated	
Feroz Awards	24 January 2026	Best Director	Carla Simón	Nominated	
Feroz Awards	24 January 2026	Best Screenplay	Carla Simón	Nominated	
Feroz Awards	24 January 2026	Best Original Soundtrack	Ernest Pipó	Nominated	
Feroz Awards	24 January 2026	Best Trailer	Miguel Ángel Trudu, Jorge García Soto	Nominated	
Feroz Awards	24 January 2026	Best Film Poster	Jose A. Peña, Quim Vives	Nominated	
Gaudí Awards	8 February 2026	Best Non-Catalan Language Film	Romería	Nominated	
Gaudí Awards	8 February 2026	Best Director	Carla Simón	Nominated	
Gaudí Awards	8 February 2026	Best Adapted Screenplay	Carla Simón	Nominated	
Gaudí Awards	8 February 2026	Best New Performance	Llúcia Garcia	Won	
Gaudí Awards	8 February 2026	Best Original Score	Ernest Pipó	Nominated	
Gaudí Awards	8 February 2026	Best Production Supervision	Elisa Sirvent Aguirre	Nominated	
Gaudí Awards	8 February 2026	Best Art Direction	Mónica Bernuy	Nominated	
Gaudí Awards	8 February 2026	Best Cinematography	Hélène Louvart	Nominated	
Gaudí Awards	8 February 2026	Best Editing	Sergio Jiménez, Ana Pfaff	Nominated	
Gaudí Awards	8 February 2026	Best Costume Design	Anna Aguilà	Nominated	
Gaudí Awards	8 February 2026	Best Sound	Eva Valiño, Alejandro Castillo	Nominated	
Gaudí Awards	8 February 2026	Best Visual Effects	Anna Aragonès, Bernat Aragonès, Alice Rathert, Christian Pundschus	Nominated	
Gaudí Awards	8 February 2026	Best Makeup and Hairstyles	Paty López, Paco Rodríguez H.	Nominated	
CEC Medals	23 February 2026	Best Director	Carla Simón	Nominated	
CEC Medals	23 February 2026	Best Adapted Screenplay	Carla Simón	Nominated	
CEC Medals	23 February 2026	Best New Actress	Llucia Garcia	Nominated	
CEC Medals	23 February 2026	Best New Actor	Mitch	Nominated	
CEC Medals	23 February 2026	Best Cinematography	Hélène Louvart	Nominated	
Goya Awards	28 February 2026	Best Director	Carla Simón	Nominated	
Goya Awards	28 February 2026	Best Adapted Screenplay	Carla Simón	Nominated	
Goya Awards	28 February 2026	Best New Actress	Llúcia Garcia	Nominated	
Goya Awards	28 February 2026	Best New Actor	Mitch	Nominated	
Goya Awards	28 February 2026	Best Supporting Actress	Miryam Gallego	Nominated	
Goya Awards	28 February 2026	Best Costume Design	Anna Aguilà	Nominated	
Actors and Actresses Union Awards	16 March 2026	Best Film Actor in a Secondary Role	Tristán Ulloa	Nominated	
Actors and Actresses Union Awards	16 March 2026	Best Film Actress in a Secondary Role	Miryam Gallego	Nominated	

== See also ==
- List of Spanish films of 2025
