= The Good Daughter (film) =

- Theatrical release poster
- Spanish: La buena hija
- Directed by: Júlia de Paz Solvas
- Screenplay by: Núria Dunjó; Júlia de Paz Solvas
- Based on: Harta (short film) by Júlia de Paz Solvas and Núria Dunjó
- Produced by: Sergio Grobas; Stefan Schmitz
- Starring: Kiara Arancibia; Janet Novás; Julián Villagrán; Petra Martínez
- Cinematography: Sandra Roca
- Edited by: Oriol Milán
- Music by: Natasha Pirard
- Production companies: Astra Pictures; Avalon; Krater Films
- Distributed by: Avalon
- Release dates: 15 November 2025 (PÖFF); 10 April 2026 (Spain)
- Countries: Spain; Belgium
- Languages: Spanish; Catalan

The Good Daughter (Spanish: La buena hija) is a 2025 drama film directed by Júlia de Paz Solvas from a screenplay co-written by Núria Dunjó. It stars newcomer Kiara Arancibia alongside Janet Novás, Julián Villagrán, and Petra Martínez. It is a Spanish-Belgian co-production.

The film world premiered at the 29th Tallinn Black Nights Film Festival on 15 November 2025 and went on to win the festival's Grand Prix. It was released theatrically in Spain by Avalon on 10 April 2026.

== Plot ==
After the separation of her parents, Carmela lives with her mother and grandmother while yearning for spending more time with her father, a plastic artist she idolises.

== Cast ==
- Kiara Arancibia as Carmela
- Janet Novás as Carmela's mother
- Petra Martínez as Carmela's grandmother
- Julián Villagrán as Carmela's father

== Production ==
Based on Júlia de Paz's short film Harta (2021), the project was known under the working title of Harta during the production stage. The feature only saw the return of actor Julián Villagrán from the short film's cast. De Paz stated that Close (2022) was also a clear inspiration for the film in its portrayal of luminous and resilience moments with children. The film is an Astra Pictures, Avalon, and Krater Films co-production with backing from ICAA, ICEC, Eurimages, RTVE, TV3, and Movistar+. Shooting locations included Sant Cugat del Vallès.

== Release ==
The Good Daughter had its world premiere in the main competition of the 29th Tallinn Black Nights Film Festival (PÖFF) in November 2025. It was also programmed in the 'International Competition' section of the 49th Göteborg Film Festival and at the 27th Arras Film Festival.

The film was presented in the official selection of the 29th Málaga Film Festival on 12 March 2026. Avalon distributes the film in Spain, with a tentative theatrical release scheduled for 10 April 2026. Beta Cinema took over handling of international sales.

== Reception ==
Wendy Ide, senior international critic of ScreenDaily, deemed the film to be an "assured and sensitively handled work", showcasing Júlia de Paz's "nuanced writing and skill in working with young actors".

Mariana Hristova of Cineuropa considered that, with the film, the director proved again "her knack for extracting the singular from stories that seem everyday and banal, and for bringing to light a sensitivity to the silent catastrophe that cuts deeper than meets the eye".

Andrea G. Bermejo of Cinemanía rated the film, her favourite so far in 2026, 4 out of 5 stars, lauding Villagrán's character, "at last, a character full of nuance, deeply complex and a match for his talent".

Juan Pando of Fotogramas rated the film 4 out of 5 stars, assessing that De Paz delivers "a calm, unhurried, profound film, without resorting to easy solutions", featuring a "colossal" Arancibia and a "splendid" supporting cast, particularly Villagrán.

Javier Ocaña of El País deemed the film to be a "sincere and balanced" work in which the director "deploys an arsenal of highly nuanced techniques", only missing perhaps more exposition about the underlying legal case presumably involving a restraining order and supervised visits.

Manuel J. Lombardo of Diario de Sevilla gave the film a 3-star rating, declaring it "a complex and nuanced portrayal of the processes of separation and personal growth experienced by children", without descending into propaganda, "which is no small feat".

== Accolades ==
Year	Award	Category	Nominee(s)	Result	Ref.
2025	29th Tallinn Black Nights Film Festival	Grand Prix		Won	
2025	29th Tallinn Black Nights Film Festival	Best Actress	Kiara Arancibia	Won	
2025	29th Tallinn Black Nights Film Festival	PÖFF Audience Award		Won	

== See also ==
- List of Spanish films of 2026
