= You All Are Captains =

- Film poster
- Todos vós sodes capitáns
- Directed by: Óliver Laxe
- Screenplay by: Óliver Laxe
- Produced by: Zeitun Films
- Cinematography: Ines Thomsen
- Edited by: Fayçal Algandouzi
- Release date: 19 May 2010 (Cannes)
- Running time: 79 minutes
- Country: Spain
- Languages: Arabic; French; Spanish

You All Are Captains (original title: Todos vós sodes capitáns) is a 2010 drama film written and directed by Óliver Laxe.

== Synopsis ==
A European filmmaker is making a movie with children living in a foster home for socially excluded youngsters in Tangier, Morocco. While filming, the director's unorthodox methods of working cause his relationship with the children to disintegrate to such a point that the initial course of the project is altered.

== Awards ==
- FIPRESCI Prize, 2010 Cannes Film Festival
- Mar del Plata 2010
- Gijón 2010
- Cineuropa Santiago de Compostela 2010
