= Sara Casasnovas =

Spanish actress (born 1984)

- Casasnovas in 2023
- Born: 8 May 1984 (age 42); Ourense, Galicia, Spain
- Occupation: Actress

Sara Casasnovas Pumar (born 3 May 1984) is a Spanish actress. After starting her career in local productions in her native Galicia, she gained national prominence in 2007 after appearing in the third series of the popular soap opera Amar en tiempos revueltos.

== Career ==
Casasnovas was born on 3 May 1984 in Ourense, Galicia, Spain. She trained as an actress at the Casa Hamlet Dramatic Art School in A Coruña, and later at the Sala Cuarta Pared in Madrid. Casasnovas is trained in cabaret and classical dance.

Casasnovas began her career performing in local Galician language productions, such as Miña sogra e máis eu and Maridos e mulleres. She gained national attention after appearing as Alicia Peña, the main character in the third series (2007) of the Televisión Española period soap opera Amar en tiempos revueltos, set during the Spanish Civil War. She later reprised the role in the 2009 television special ¿Quién mató a Hipólito Roldán?. Between 2006 and 2007, Casasnovas was part of the cast of the daily teen drama series [[SMS: Sin Miedo a Soñar]], created by Daniel Écija and Carmen Ortiz and broadcast on LaSexta. She went on to play José, a doctor in the medical drama Hospital Central.

In June 2009, while Casasnovas was appearing in the play The Night of the Iguana, a German national attempted to shoot her with a crossbow outside the theatre. The assailant was subdued by Casasnovas' friends, and she was not harmed.

In August 2010, Casasnovas played the titular role in Benito Pérez Galdós' play Electra at the Roman Theatre in Mérida.

Between 2014 and 2015, Casasnovas was part of the cast of the thriller television series Sin identidad, which aired on Antena 3. In 2019, she appeared in the film Elisa and Marcela, a romantic biopic directed by Isabel Coixet.

In 2025, Casasnovas was featured in the Carla Simón film Romería, which premiered in competition at the 2025 Cannes Film Festival.
