= Llúcia Garcia =

Spanish actress (born 2006)

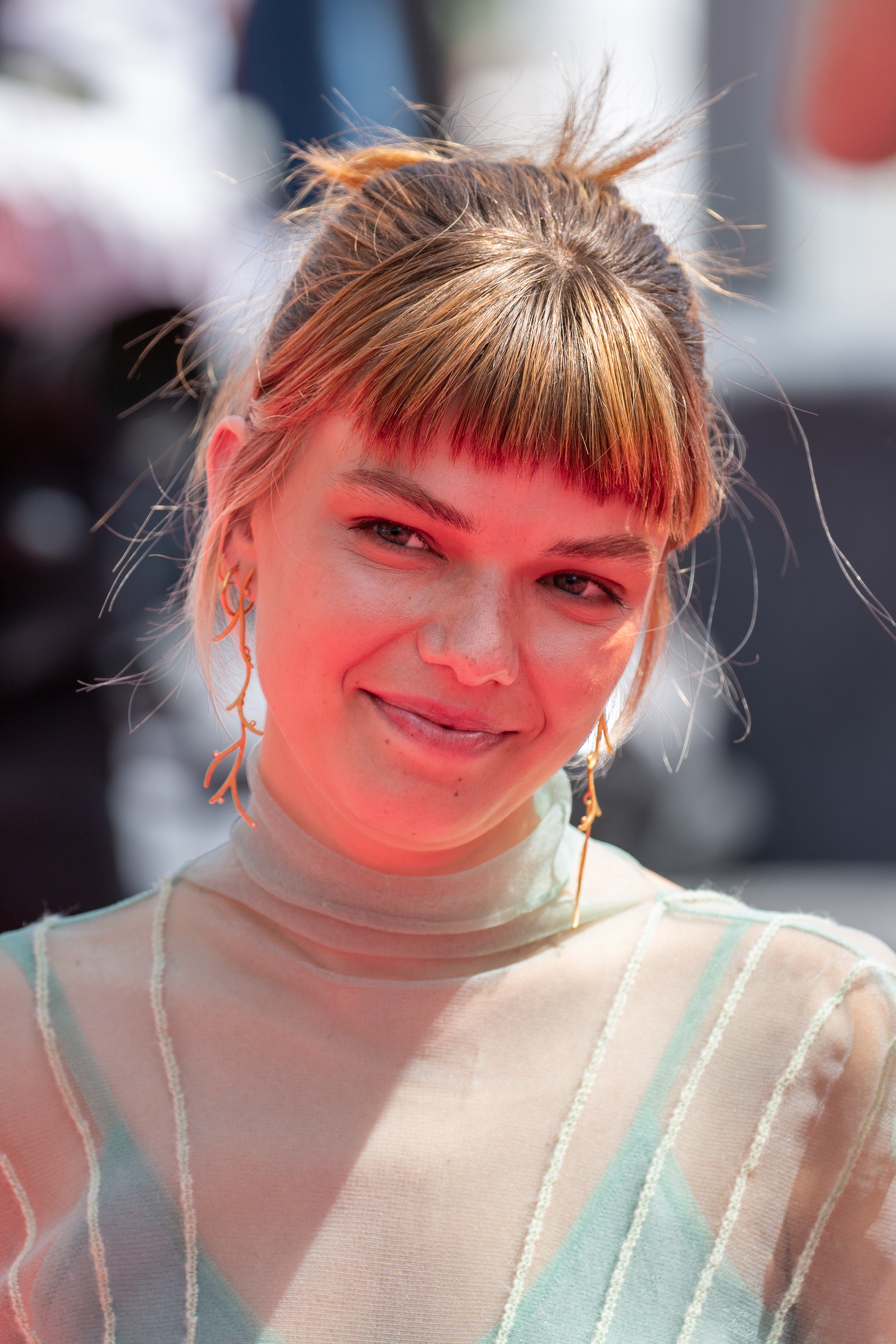
- Garcia at the 2025 Cannes Film Festival
- Born: Llúcia Garcia Torras; 2006 (age 19–20); Barcelona, Catalonia, Spain
- Occupation: Actress
- Years active: 2025–present

Llúcia Garcia Torras (born 2006) is a Spanish actress. She made her film debut in Carla Simón's Romería (2025), earning a Goya Award nomination for her starring role.

== Early life ==
Born in Barcelona, Garcia grew up in the neighborhood of Vila de Gràcia. She is the granddaughter of historian Josep Maria Torras i Ribé.

== Career ==
Garcia had no professional acting experience before taking on the starring role in Carla Simón's film Romería. She was invited to audition having just returned to Barcelona from a five-day camping trip. Inspired by Simón's own life, Romería follows a young woman, Marina, who seeks traces of the lives of her parents who died of AIDS when she was young. Garcia played the dual role of Marina and her mother. The film received positive reviews after premiering at the 2025 Cannes Film Festival, including praise for Garcia with particular attention to her naturalness and her eyes. She was nominated for Best New Actress at the Goya Awards and earned the prize for Best New Performance at the Gaudí Awards. Despite the film's success, she said after its release that she had not decided whether she wanted to pursue a film career.
