= Jaione Camborda =

Spanish film director and screenwriter (born 1983)

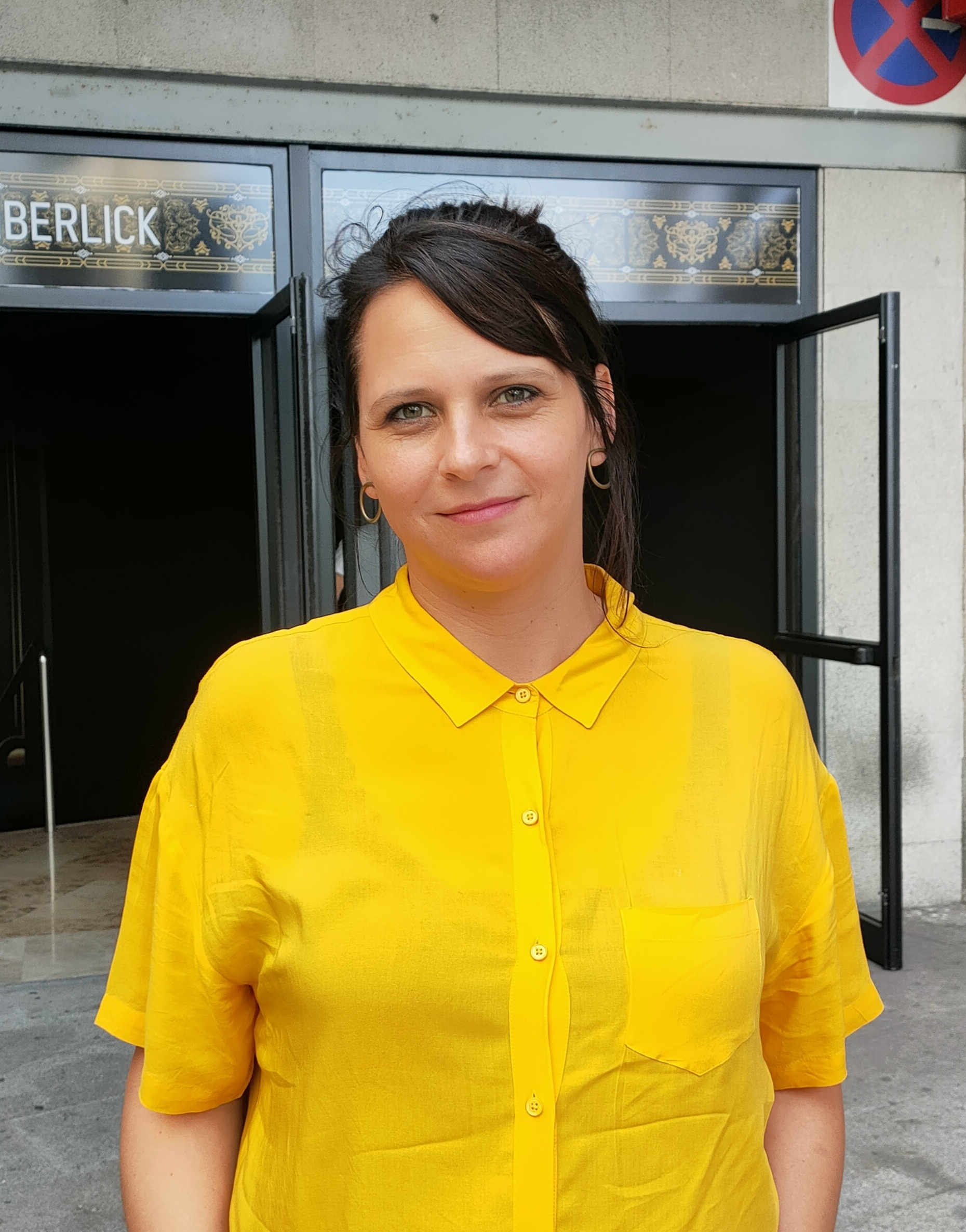
- Camborda in 2023
- Born: Jaione Camborda Coll; 1 March 1983 (age 43); San Sebastián, Basque Country, Spain
- Education: Film and TV School of the Academy of Performing Arts in Prague; University of Television and Film Munich
- Occupation: Film director
- Years active: 2010–present
- Notable work: The Rye Horn

Jaione Camborda Coll (born 1 March 1983) is a Spanish film director and screenwriter. Camborda's second feature, The Rye Horn (2023), won the Golden Shell at the San Sebastián Film Festival.

== Biography ==
Camborda was born in San Sebastián. She studied film directing at FAMU and HFF Munich.

Camborda is a part of the Novo Cine Galego, an artistic movement of Galician cinema creators. She took part in many projects as a co-director, such as O ouro do Tempo, 2011 film by Xavier Bermúdez. As an art director, she worked on Encallados (2013), Os fenómenos (2014), and Red Moon Tide (2020). She co-authored the screenplay of Alfonso Zarauza's Ons (2020). Camborda founded her own production company Esnatu Zinema, and directed several experimental short films, such as Wild Mane Crop, Agility and Nimbos.

Her first feature, Arima, was shot entirely on celluloid film. The movie was presented at the 16th Seville Film Festival. It won the Best Film Award at the IX Festival Márgenes de Madrid.

Her second feature, The Rye Horn, won the Golden Shell at the San Sebastián Film Festival, making Camborda the first Spanish female director winner in the 71 years of the festival's history.
