= Oliver Laxe =

French-Galician actor and filmmaker

Óliver Laxe
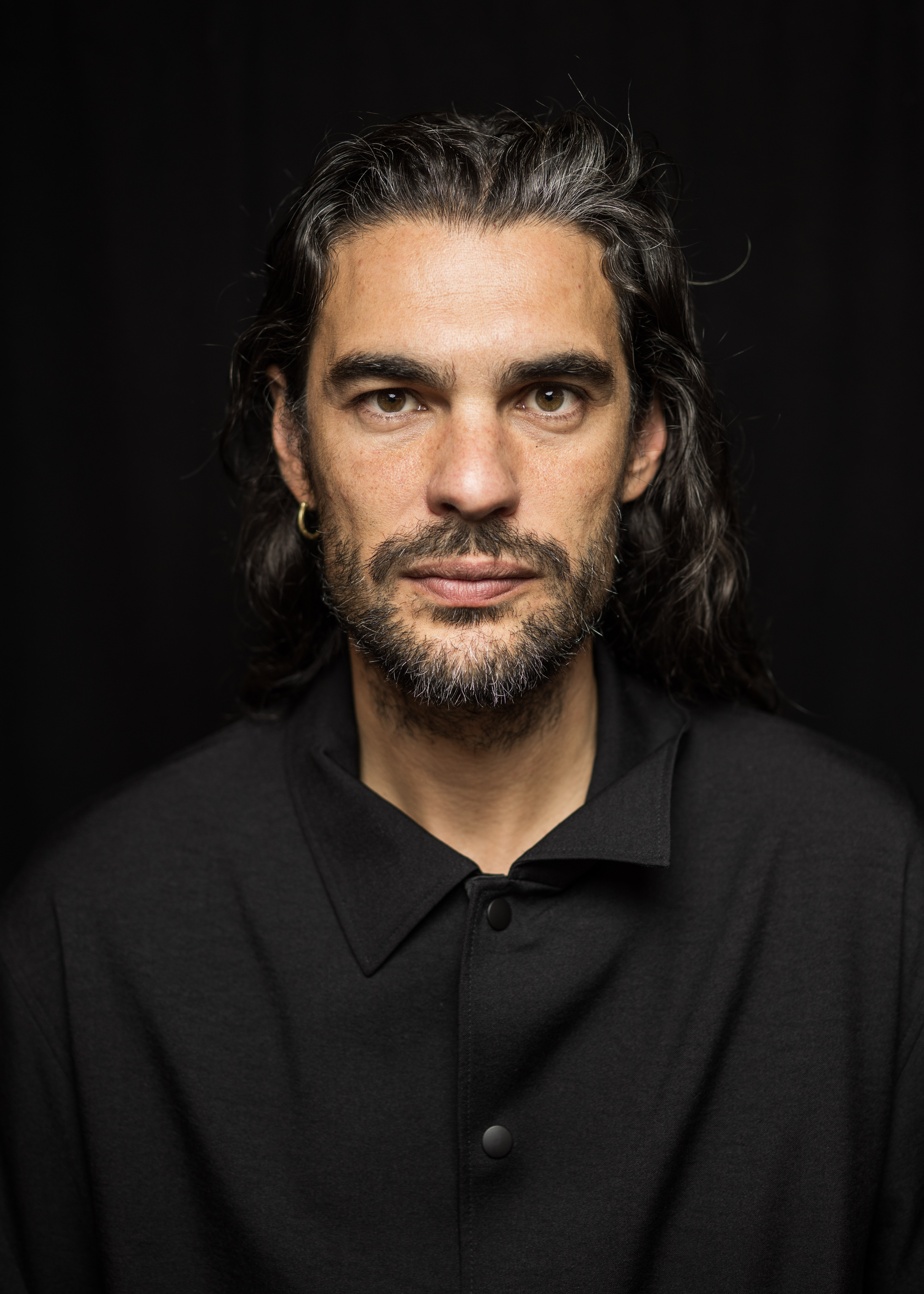
- Laxe in 2025
- Born: Óliver Lage Coro; 1982 (age 43–44); Paris, France
- Education: Pompeu Fabra University
- Occupation: Filmmaker
- Years active: 2006–present

Óliver Laxe Coro (Galician: [ˈlaʃɪ]; born 1982) is a French-born Galician film director, screenwriter, and actor. He is known for his films You All Are Captains (2010), Mimosas (2016), Fire Will Come (2019), and Sirāt (2025). The latter was nominated for Best International Film and Best Sound at the 98th Academy Awards and earned Laxe the Jury Prize at the 2025 Cannes Film Festival.

== Early life and education ==
Laxe was born Óliver Lage Coro, later changing his surname from the castilianized version Lage to Laxe. He was born in 1982 in Paris to Galician parents. They had met at Bataclan at a dance party for emigrants and worked as concierges in the 16th arrondissement. Laxe's grandparents were peasants from Lugo, his mother is from Vilela, Navia de Suarna, while his father is from A Ponte de Outeiro, Castro de Rei.

He grew up in the city in a room shared with his parents and attended the Spanish government-operated school Federico García Lorca until the age of six. In 1988, after a picture taken by his father Jacinto won a prize at the Paris Photography Salon, Laxe's father was hired to work selling photography materials in Manlleu, Catalonia. As the job was not what he expected, the family moved back to Galicia and settled in A Coruña. Óliver attended the IES Monelos and in his teens played for Básquet Coruña's youth team.

After completing his secondary education, he moved to Pontevedra and studied for two years Advertising and Public Relations at the University of Vigo's Faculty of Communication, during which time he lived in the Plaza de la Verdura and discovered arthouse cinema at the Pontevedra Film Club. He associated with the college's fine art students, and staged several art installations during this time. Disillusioned with his major, he moved to Barcelona where he finally studied filmmaking at the Pompeu Fabra University and did his Erasmus in London where he filmed his first short and final degree project Y las chimeneas decidieron escapar. After graduating in 2006, he moved to Morocco.

Laxe has a brother, Felipe, who works as a film producer and often collaborates on his films.

== Career ==
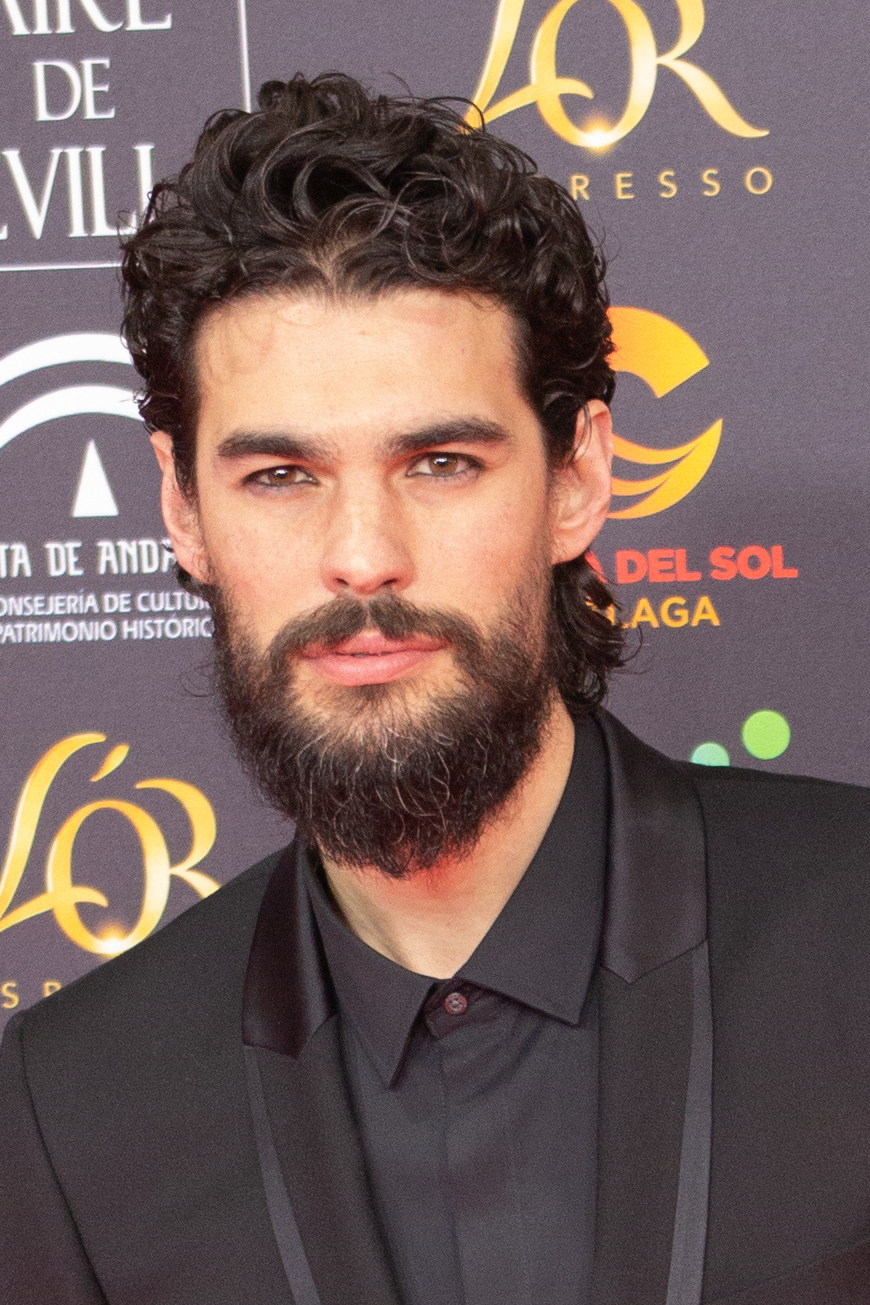
Laxe at the Goya Awards in 2020

His directorial debut feature film, You All Are Captains, premiered in the Directors' Fortnight (Quinzaine des réalisateurs) section at the 2010 Cannes Film Festival, where it won the FIPRESCI Prize.

In 2013 he acted in the experimental film O quinto evanxeo de Gaspar Hauser, directed by Alberto Gracia.

His second feature as director, Mimosas, was filmed in the Atlas Mountains and screened in the Critics' Week section at the 2016 Cannes Film Festival, where it won the Nespresso Grand Prize. The project was developed through the TorinoFilmLab Interchange programme in 2011.

Returning to his native Galicia, he directed Fire Will Come, which premiered at the 2019 Cannes Film Festival and won the Un Certain Regard Jury Prize.

His fourth feature, Sirāt, premiered in Competition at the 2025 Cannes Film Festival and won the Jury Prize.

== Personal life ==
Aside from his native Galician and Spanish, Laxe is fluent in French. He can also speak Catalan and English. He changed his surname from the castilianized version Lage.

Laxe has been living in Navia de Suarna, Lugo since 2020. The family house, named Casa Quindós after his maternal grandmother, also functions as the headquarters of the Ser Association, which promotes cultural and environmentalist activities in rural Galicia. He was married to costume designer and casting director Nadia Acimi for five years. They divorced in 2024, shortly before they both started filming for Sirāt.

== Filmography ==
=== Feature films ===
Year	English Title	Original Title
2010	You All Are Captains	Todos vós sodes capitáns
2016	Mimosas	
2019	Fire Will Come	O que arde
2025	Sirāt	

=== Short films ===
Year	Title
2006	Y las chimeneas decidieron escapar
2007	Suena la trompeta, ahora veo otra cara
2008	París #1

=== Other Credits ===
Year	Title	Notes
2010	Moussem les morts	Only actor
2015	The Sky Trembles and the Earth Is Afraid and the Two Eyes Are Not Brothers	Only actor

== Awards and nominations ==
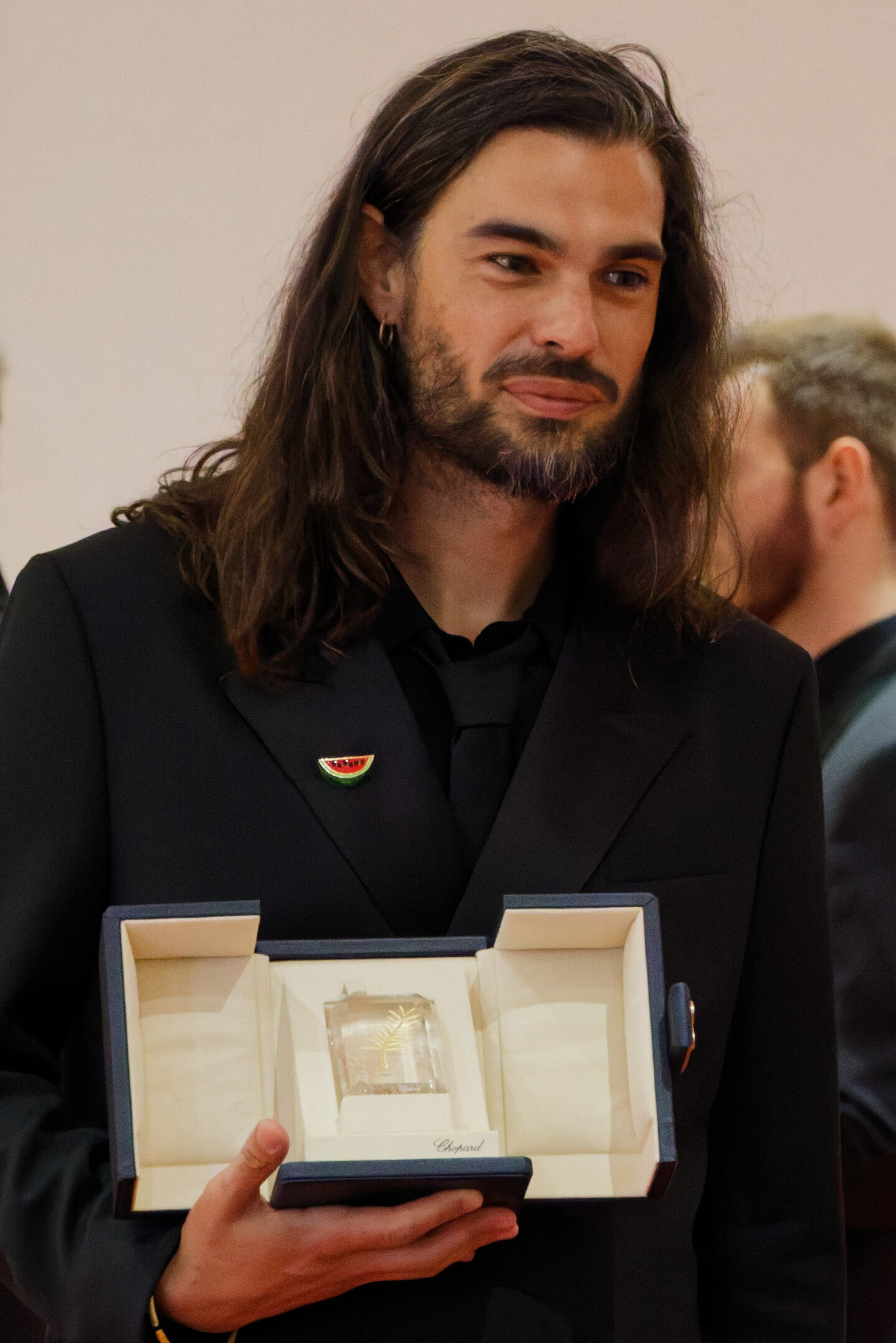
Laxe with the Jury Prize at the 78th Cannes Film Festival

Award	Year	Category	Film	Result	Ref.
Academy Awards	2025	Best International Feature Film	Sirāt	Nominated	
Golden Globes	2025	Best Non-English Language Film	Sirāt	Nominated	
British Independent Film Awards	2025	Best International Independent Film	Sirāt	Nominated	
Cairo International Film Festival	2016	Golden Pyramid	Mimosas	Won	
Cannes Film Festival	2010	FIPRESCI Prize – Quinzaine des réalisateurs	You All Are Captains	Won	
Cannes Film Festival	2010	Caméra d'Or	You All Are Captains	Nominated	
Cannes Film Festival	2016	Critics' Week Grand Prize	Mimosas	Won	
Cannes Film Festival	2019	Un Certain Regard Jury Prize	Fire Will Come	Won	
Cannes Film Festival	2025	Palme d'Or	Sirāt	Nominated	
Cannes Film Festival	2025	Jury Prize	Sirāt	Won	
Chicago International Film Festival	2025	Gold Hugo	Sirāt	Won	
Denver Film Festival	2025	Krzysztof Kieslowski Award	Sirāt	Won	
European Film Awards	2026	European Film	Sirāt	Nominated	
European Film Awards	2026	European Director	Sirāt	Nominated	
European Film Awards	2026	European Screenwriter	Sirāt	Nominated	
Gaudí Awards	2020	Best European Film	Fire Will Come	Won	
Gaudí Awards	2026	Best Non-Catalan Language Film	Sirāt	Won	
Gaudí Awards	2026	Best Director	Sirāt	Nominated	
Gotham Awards	2025	Best Director	Sirāt	Nominated	
Goya Awards	2026	Best Director	Sirāt	Nominated	
Goya Awards	2026	Best Original Screenplay	Sirāt	Nominated	
Goya Awards	2020	Best Director	Fire Will Come	Nominated	
Hainan International Film Festival	2019	Special Jury Prize	Fire Will Come	Won	
Lumière Awards	2017	Best French-Language Film	Mimosas	Nominated	
Seville European Film Festival	2016	Grand Jury Award	Mimosas	Won	
Taipei Film Festival	2017	Special Jury Prize	Mimosas	Won	
Thessaloniki Film Festival	2019	Golden Alexander	Fire Will Come	Won	
