= List of Spanish films of 2019 =

A list of Spanish-produced and co-produced feature films released in Spain in 2019. When applicable, the domestic theatrical release date is favoured.

== Films ==
Release		Title (Domestic title)	Cast & Crew	Distribution label	Ref.
J A N U A R Y	4	Memoirs of a Man in Pajamas (Memorias de un hombre en pijama)	Director: Carlos FerFer Cast: Raúl Arévalo	Begin Again Films	
J A N U A R Y	18	In Family I Trust (Gente que viene y bah)	Director: Patricia Font Cast: Clara Lago, Álex García, Alexandra Jiménez, Paula Malia, Fernando Guallar, Carlos Cuevas, Carmen Maura	DeAPlaneta	
F E B R U A R Y	1	Under the Same Roof (Bajo el mismo techo)	Director: Juana Macías Cast: Jordi Sánchez, Silvia Abril, Daniel Guzmán, Malena Alterio, Álvaro Cervantes, Cristina Castaño, Ana Morgade	Sony Pictures	
F E B R U A R Y	15	Off Course... To China (Perdiendo el este)	Director: Paco Caballero Cast: Julián López, Miki Esparbé, Silvia Alonso, Younes Bachir, Chacha Huang, Edu Soto	Warner Bros. Pictures	
M A R C H	1	4L (4 latas)	Director: Gerardo Olivares Cast: Jean Reno, Hovik Keuchkerian, Susana Abaitua, Arturo Valls, Enrique San Francisco	Wanda Visión	
M A R C H	1	Hostage Radio (Feedback)	Director: Pedro C. Alonso Cast: Ivana Baquero, Eddie Marsan, Paul Anderson, Richard Brake, Alexis Rodney	eOne Films	
M A R C H	8	70 Big Ones (70 binladens)	Director: Koldo Serra Cast: Emma Suárez, Nathalie Poza, Hugo Silva	Filmax	
M A R C H	15	Taxi to Gibraltar (Taxi a Gibraltar)	Director: Alejo Flah Cast: Dani Rovira, Ingrid García-Jonsson, Joaquín Furriel	Warner Bros. Pictures	(Note: Co-production Spain–Argentina (80%–20%).)
M A R C H	22	Pain and Glory (Dolor y gloria)	Director: Pedro Almodóvar Cast: Antonio Banderas, Asier Etxeandia, Leonardo Sbaraglia, Nora Navas, Penélope Cruz	Sony Pictures	
M A R C H	29	Get Her... If You Can (¿Qué te juegas?)	Director: Inés de León Cast: Leticia Dolera, Amaia Salamanca, Javier Rey, Mariam Hernández, Daniel Pérez Prada, Brays Efe	A Contracorriente Films	
M A R C H	29	¡Ay, mi madre!	Director: Frank Ariza Cast: Estefanía de los Santos, Secun de la Rosa, Paz Vega, Mariola Fuentes, Marta Torné, Terele Pávez	World Line Cinema	
A P R I L	5	7 Reasons to Run Away (7 raons per fugir)	Director: Gerard Quinto, Esteve Solar, David Torras Cast: Emma Suárez, Lola Dueñas, Sergi López, Francesc Orella, David Verdaguer, Jordi Sánchez, Pepe Viyuela, Alex Brendemühl, Manuel Solo	Syldavia Cinema	
A P R I L	12	I Can Quit Whenever I Want (Lo dejo cuando quiera)	Director: Carlos Therón Cast: David Verdaguer, Ernesto Sevilla, Carlos Santos, Cristina Castaño, Miren Ibarguren, Amaia Salamanca, Ernesto Alterio	Sony Pictures	
A P R I L	26	The Little Switzerland (La pequeña Suiza)	Director: Kepa Sojo Cast: Reparto: Jon Plazaola, Maggie Civantos, Ingrid García Jonsson, Secun de la Rosa, Enrique Villén, Ramón Barea	eOne Films	
A P R I L	26	Buñuel in the Labyrinth of the Turtles (Buñuel en el laberinto de las tortugas)	Director: Salvador Simó	Wanda Visión	
M A Y	10	The Incredible Shrinking Wknd (El increíble finde menguante)	Director: Jon Mikel Caballero Cast: Iria del Río, Adam Quintero, Nadia de Santiago, Jimmy Castro, Adrián Expósito, Irene Ruiz, Luis Tosar	Oliete Films	
M A Y	17	The Year of the Plague (El año de la plaga)	Director: Carlos Martín Ferrera Cast: Iván Massagué, Ana Serradilla, Miriam Giovanelli	Filmax	(Note: Co-production Spain–Mexico–Belgium (70%–15%–15%).)
M A Y	24	Elisa & Marcela (Elisa y Marcela)	Director: Isabel Coixet Cast: Natalia de Molina, Greta Fernández	Netflix	
J U N E	7	The Burning (Antes de la quema)	Director: Fernando Colomo Cast: Salva Reina, Joaquín Núñez, Manuela Velasco, Maggie Civantos, Manuel Manquiña	Vértice 360	
J U N E	21	The Influence (La influencia)	Director: Denis Rovira van Boekholt Cast: Emma Suárez, Manuela Vellés, Maggie Civantos, Alain Hernández, Claudia Placer, Mariana Cordero	Sony Pictures	
J U N E	28	Los Japón (Los Japón)	Director: Álvaro Díaz Lorenzo Cast: Dani Rovira, María León, Antonio Dechent, Cinta Ramírez, Iker Castiñeira, Maya Murofushi, Boré Buika	Warner Bros. Pictures	
J U N E	28	The Days to Come (Els dies que vindran)	Director: Carlos Marques-Marcet Cast: David Verdaguer, Maria Rodríguez Soto	Avalon	
J U L Y	5	Elcano & Magellan: The First Voyage Around the World (Elcano y Magallanes, la primera vuelta al mundo)	Director: Ángel Alonso	Filmax	
J U L Y	12	The Weasel's Tale (El cuento de las comadrejas)	Director: Juan José Campanella Cast: Graciela Borges, Óscar Martínez, Luis Brandoni, Marcos Mundstock, Nicolás Francella, Clara Lago	Syldavia Cinema	(Note: Co-production Spain–Argentina (30%–70%).)
J U L Y	12	Life Without Sara Amat (La vida sense la Sara Amat)	Director: Laura Jou Cast: Biel Rossell, Maria Morera, Francesca Piñón, Isaac Alcayde, Pau Escobar, Joan Amargós	Alfa Pictures	
J U L Y	12	Lo nunca visto	Director: Marina Seresesky Cast: Carmen Machi, Pepón Nieto, Jon Kortajarena, Kiti Mánver, Paco Tous	Filmax	
J U L Y	26	Me, Myself and My Dead Wife (Yo, mi mujer y mi mujer muerta)	Director: Santi Amodeo Cast: Carlos Areces, Oscar Martínez, Ingrid García-Jonsson	#ConUnPack	
A U G U S T	1	Father There Is Only One (Padre no hay más que uno)	Director: Santiago Segura Cast: Santiago Segura, Toni Acosta, Leo Harlem, Silvia Abril	Sony Pictures	
A U G U S T	2	Remember Me	Director: Martín Rosete Cast: Bruce Dern, Caroline Silhol, Isabel García Lorca, Verónica Forqué	Filmax	
A U G U S T	15	The August Virgin (La virgen de agosto)	Director: Jonás Trueba Cast: Itsaso Arana	BTeam Pictures	
A U G U S T	30	Eye for an Eye (Quien con hierro mata)	Director: Paco Plaza Cast: Luis Tosar, Xan Cejudo, Ismael Martínez, Enric Auquer, María Vázquez	Sony Pictures	
S E P T E M B E R	6	Live Twice, Love Once (Vivir dos veces)	Director: María Ripoll Cast: Óscar Martínez, Inma Cuesta, Mafalda Carbonell, Nacho López, Aina Clotet	Filmax	
S E P T E M B E R	13	The Silent War (Sordo)	Director: Alfonso Cortés-Cavanillas Cast: Asier Etxeandia, Aitor Luna, Hugo Silva, Imanol Arias, Marian Álvarez, Olimpia Melinte	Filmax	
S E P T E M B E R	13	Litus	Director: Dani de la Orden Cast: Belén Cuesta, Adrián Lastra, Álex García, Quim Gutiérrez, Miquel Fernández, Marta Nieto	A Contracorriente Films	
S E P T E M B E R	27	While at War (Mientras dure la guerra)	Director: Alejandro Amenábar Cast: Karra Elejalde, Eduard Fernández, Santi Prego, Tito Valverde, Patricia López Arnaiz	Buena Vista International	
O C T O B E R	4	Seventeen (Diecisiete)	Director: Daniel Sánchez Arévalo Cast: Biel Montoro, Nacho Sánchez	A Contracorriente Films	
O C T O B E R	11	Paradise Hills	Director: Alice Waddington Cast: Emma Roberts, Danielle Macdonald, Awkwafina, Milla Jovovich	Alfa Pictures	(Note: Co-production Spain–United States (80%–20%).)
O C T O B E R	11	Fire Will Come (O que arde)	Director: Oliver Laxe Cast: Amador Arias, Benedicta Sánchez	Nocturama	(Note: Co-production Spain–France–Luxembourg (49.59%–31.51%–18.90%).)
O C T O B E R	18	The Goya Murders (El asesino de los caprichos)	Director: Gerardo Herrero Cast: Maribel Verdú, Aura Garrido, Roberto Álamo, Daniel Grao, Ruth Gabriel	A Contracorriente Films	(Note: Co-production Spain–Belgium (80%–20%).)
O C T O B E R	25	Twin Murders: The Silence of the White City (El misterio de la ciudad blanca)	Director: Daniel Calparsoro Cast: Belén Rueda, Aura Garrido, Javier Rey	DeAPlaneta	
O C T O B E R	31	The Endless Trench (La trinchera infinita)	Director: Josemari Goenaga, Luiso Berdejo Cast: Antonio de la Torre, Belén Cuesta, José Manuel Poga, Vicente Vergara	eOne Films	
O C T O B E R	31	The Rodriguez and the Beyond (Los Rodríguez y el más allá)	Director: Paco Arango Cast: Edu Soto, Mariana Treviño, Geraldine Chaplin, Plácido Domingo, Santiago Segura, Rossy de Palma, Omar Chaparro	European Dreams Factory	
N O V E M B E R	8	The Platform (El hoyo)	Director: Galder Gaztelu-Urrutia Cast: Iván Massagué, Antonia San Juan, Zorion Eguileor, Emilio Buale, Alexandra Masangkay	Festival Films	
N O V E M B E R	8	Advantages of Travelling by Train (Ventajas de viajar en tren)	Director: Aritz Moreno Cast: Luis Tosar, Ernesto Alterio, Belén Cuesta, Pilar Castro, Quim Gutiérrez	Filmax	
N O V E M B E R	15	Mother (Madre)	Director: Rodrigo Sorogoyen Cast: Marta Nieto, Jules Porier, Alex Brendemühl, Anne Consigny, Frédéric Pierrot	Wanda Visión	
N O V E M B E R	15	Klaus	Director: Sergio Pablos	Netflix	
N O V E M B E R	15	If I Were Rich (Si yo fuera rico)	Director: Álvaro Fernández Armero Cast: Álex García, Alexandra Jiménez, Jordi Sánchez, Adrián Lastra, Diego Martín, Franky Martín, Antonio Resines, Paula Echevarría	Paramount Pictures	
N O V E M B E R	22	Bye (Adiós)	Director: Paco Cabezas Cast: Mario Casas, Natalia de Molina, Ruth Díaz	Sony Pictures	
N O V E M B E R	22	Out in the Open (Intemperie)	Director: Benito Zambrano Cast: Luis Tosar, Luis Callejo, Jaime López	A Contracorriente Films	(Note: Co-production Spain–Portugal (80%–20%).)
N O V E M B E R	29	A Thief's Daughter (La hija de un ladrón)	Director: Belén Funes Cast: Greta Fernández, Eduard Fernández, Àlex Monner	BTeam Pictures	
N O V E M B E R	29	Heroic Losers (La odisea de los giles)	Director: Sebastián Borensztein Cast: Ricardo Darín, Luis Brandoni, Chino Darín, Verónica Llinás, Daniel Aráoz	Alfa Pictures	(Note: Co-production Spain–Argentina (20%–80%).)
D E C E M B E R	5	The Legacy of the Bones (Legado en los huesos)	Director: Fernando González Molina Cast: Marta Etura, Carlos Librado, Leonardo Sbaraglia, Francesc Orella, Imanol Arias, Susi Sánchez	DeAPlaneta	

== Box office ==
The ten highest-grossing Spanish feature films in 2019, by domestic box office gross revenue, are as follows:

Highest-grossing films of 2019
Rank	Title	Distributor	Admissions	Domestic gross (€)
1	Father There Is Only One (Padre no hay más que uno)	Sony Pictures	2,396,195	13,622,686
2	I Can Quit Whenever I Want (Lo dejo cuando quiera)	Sony Pictures	1,838,819	11,094,891
3	If I Were Rich (Si yo fuera rico)	Paramount Pictures	1,767,740	10,773,156
4	While at War (Mientras dure la guerra)	Buena Vista International	1,862,495	10,697,110
5	Pain and Glory (Dolor y gloria)	Sony Pictures	934,169	5,668,113
6	Under the Same Roof (Bajo el mismo techo)	Sony Pictures	588,678	3,527,676
7	Off Course... To China (Perdiendo el este)	Warner Bros. Pictures	494,585	2,971,962
8	The Japon (Los Japón)	Warner Bros. Pictures	461,310	2,649,996
9	Eye for an Eye (Quien a hierro mata)	Sony Pictures	413,871	2,444,933
10	Twin Murders: The Silence of the White City (El silencio de la ciudad blanca)	DeAPlaneta	461,415	2,313,307

== See also ==
- 34th Goya Awards
