= 75th CEC Awards =

Spanish film awards

- Date: 20 January 2020
- Site: Palacio de la Prensa, Madrid, Spain
- Hosted by: Eva Ugarte; Franky Martín
- Organized by: Círculo de Escritores Cinematográficos

Highlights
- Most awards: Pain and Glory (5)
- Most nominations: Pain and Glory (10)

The 75th CEC Medals ceremony, presented by the Círculo de Escritores Cinematográficos, took place on 20 January 2020 at the Palacio de la Prensa in Madrid. The gala was hosted by Eva Ugarte and Franky Martín.

== Winners and nominees ==
The winners and nominees are listed as follows:

Best Film: Pain and Glory; The Endless Trench; While at War; Out in the Open; El crack cero	Best Animation Film: Buñuel in the Labyrinth of the Turtles; Klaus; Elcano & Magellan: The First Voyage Around the World
Best Director: Pedro Almodóvar – Pain and Glory; Alejandro Amenábar – While at War; Jon Garaño, Aitor Arregi, Jose Mari Goenaga – The Endless Trench; José Luis Garci – El crack cero; Benito Zambrano – Out in the Open	Best New Director: Salvador Simó – Buñuel in the Labyrinth of the Turtles; Belén Funes – A Thief's Daughter; Santiago Requejo – Grandfathers; Galder Gaztelu-Urrutia – The Platform
Best Original Screenplay: Pedro Almodóvar – Pain and Glory; Alejandro Amenábar y Alejandro Hernández – While at War; Luiso Berdejo, Jose Mari Goenaga – The Endless Trench; Santiago Fillol, Oliver Laxe – Fire Will Come	Best Adapted Screenplay: Eligio R. Montero, Salvador Simó – Buñuel in the Labyrinth of the Turtles; Pablo Remón, Daniel Remón, Benito Zambrano – Out in the Open; Javier Gullón – Advantages of Travelling by Train; Rodrigo Sorogoyen, Isabel Peña – Mother
Best Actor: Antonio Banderas – Pain and Glory; Carlos Santos – El crack cero; Antonio de la Torre – The Endless Trench; Luis Tosar – Out in the Open; Karra Elejalde – While at War	Best Actress: Marta Nieto – Mother; Greta Fernández – A Thief's Daughter; Belén Cuesta – The Endless Trench; Pilar Castro – Advantages of Travelling by Train
Best Supporting Actor: Eduard Fernández – While at War; Miguel Ángel Muñoz – El crack cero; Asier Etxeandia – Pain and Glory; Luis Callejo – Out in the Open	Best Supporting Actress: Natalia de Molina – Bye; Julieta Serrano – Pain and Glory; Penélope Cruz – Pain and Glory; Mona Martínez – Bye
Best New Actor: Enric Auquer – Eye for an Eye; Nacho Sánchez – Seventeen; Santi Prego – While at War; Jaime López – Out in the Open	Best New Actress: Greta Fernández – A Thief's Daughter; Carmen Arrufat – The Innocence; Benedicta Sánchez – Fire Will Come; Elena Andrada – El viatge de la Marta (Staff Only)
Best Cinematography: Luis Ángel Pérez – El crack cero; José Luis Alcaine – Pain and Glory; Alex Catalán – While at War; Mauro Herce – Fire Will Come	Best Editing: Luis de la Madrid, Miguel A. Trudu – Bye; Carolina Martínez Urbina – While at War; Teresa Font – Pain and Glory; Laurent Dufreche, Raúl López– The Endless Trench
Best Music: Alberto Iglesias – Pain and Glory; Arturo Cardelús – Buñuel in the Labyrinth of the Turtles; Pascal Gaigne – The Endless Trench; Zeltia Montes – Bye	Best Documentary Film: El cuadro; Aute Retrato; Regresa El Cepa; Ara Malikian: Una vida entre las cuerdas
Best Foreign Film: Parasite; The Irishman; Joker; Marriage Story

== Special awards ==
- Honorary Medal: José Sacristán
- Medal for the Promotion of Cinema: Nieves Peñuelas and Elena Vázquez
- Medal for the Journalistic Merit: Carlos Pumares
- 'Solidaridad' Medal: Grandfathers
