= 7th Feroz Awards =

2020 Spanish film and television awards

- Date: January 16, 2020
- Site: Teatro Auditorio Ciudad de Alcobendas, Alcobendas
- Hosted by: María Hervás
- Organized by: Asociación de Informadores Cinematográficos de España

Highlights
- Best Picture: Pain and Glory (Drama); Advantages of Travelling by Train (Comedy)
- Best Direction: Pedro Almodóvar; Pain and Glory
- Best Actor: Antonio Banderas; Pain and Glory
- Best Actress: Belén Cuesta; The Endless Trench
- Most awards: Pain and Glory (6)
- Most nominations: Pain and Glory (10)

Television coverage
- Network: Telemadrid

The 7th award ceremony of the Feroz Awards was held at the Teatro Auditorio Ciudad de Alcobendas in Alcobendas, Community of Madrid, on January 16, 2020. The ceremony was hosted by María Hervás and was televised by Telemadrid.

== Nominees ==
Nominations were announced on 29 November 2019 in Madrid by María Guerra and Greta Fernández.

=== Film ===
Best Drama Film: Pain and Glory; The Platform; The Endless Trench; Fire Will Come; The Days to Come; Eye for an Eye	Best Comedy Film: Advantages of Travelling by Train; Seventeen; The Incredible Shrinking Wknd; Litus; I Can Quit Whenever I Want
Best Director: Pedro Almodóvar — Pain and Glory; Aitor Arregi, Jon Garaño, Jose Mari Goenaga — The Endless Trench; Galder Gaztelu-Urrutia — The Platform; Oliver Laxe — Fire Will Come; Aritz Moreno — Advantages of Travelling by Train	Best Screenplay: Pedro Almodóvar — Pain and Glory; David Desola, Pedro Rivero — The Platform; Luiso Berdejo, Jose Mari Goenaga — The Endless Trench; Santiago Fillol, Oliver Laxe — Fire Will Come; Javier Gullón — Advantages of Travelling by Train
Best Main Actor: Antonio Banderas — Pain and Glory; Antonio de la Torre — The Endless Trench; Karra Elejalde — While at War; Luis Tosar — Eye for an Eye; David Verdaguer — The Days to Come	Best Main Actress: Belén Cuesta — The Endless Trench; Pilar Castro — Advantages of Travelling by Train; Greta Fernández — A Thief's Daughter; Marta Nieto — Mother; María Rodríguez Soto — The Days to Come
Best Supporting Actor: Enric Auquer — Eye for an Eye; Asier Etxeandia — Pain and Glory; Eduard Fernández — A Thief's Daughter; Quim Gutiérrez — Advantages of Travelling by Train; Leonardo Sbaraglia — Pain and Glory	Best Supporting Actress: Julieta Serrano — Pain and Glory; Penélope Cruz — Pain and Glory; Mona Martínez — Bye; Laia Marull — The Innocence; Antonia San Juan — The Platform
Best Original Soundtrack: Alberto Iglesias — Pain and Glory; Zeltia Montes — Bye; Arturo Cardelús — Buñuel in the Labyrinth of the Turtles; Pascal Gaigne — The Endless Trench; Alejandro Amenábar — While at War; Cristobal Tapia de Veer — Advantages of Travelling by Train	Best Trailer: Bye; Carmen & Lola; Pain and Glory; The Platform; Fire Will Come; While at War
Best Film Poster: El crack cero; The Platform; The August Virgin; Fire Will Come; Advantages of Travelling by Train	Best Documentary Film: The Hidden City; El cuadro; El cuarto reino. El reino de los plásticos; Enero; Zumiriki
Special Award: The Silent War; Boi; La banda; The August Virgin; Ojos negros

=== Television ===
Best Drama Series: Hierro (season 1, Movistar+); En el corredor de la muerte (limited series, Movistar+); Foodie Love (season 1, HBO Europe); Money Heist (season 3, Netflix); La peste (season 2, Movistar+)	Best Comedy Series: Perfect Life (season 1, Movistar+); Paquita Salas (season 3, Netflix); Vota Juan (season 1, TNT España)
Best Main Actor in a Series: Javier Cámara — Vota Juan; Brays Efe — Paquita Salas; Darío Grandinetti — Hierro; Álvaro Morte — Money Heist; Miguel Ángel Silvestre — En el corredor de la muerte	Best Main Actress in a Series: Candela Peña — Hierro; Toni Acosta — Señoras del (h)AMPA; Laia Costa — Foodie Love; Leticia Dolera — Vida perfecta; Eva Ugarte — Mira lo que has hecho
Best Supporting Actor in a Series: Enric Auquer — Perfect Life; Jesús Carroza — La peste; Óscar Casas — Instinto; Eduard Fernández — Criminal: Spain; Adam Jezierski — Vota Juan	Best Supporting Actress in a Series: Yolanda Ramos — Paquita Salas; Belén Cuesta — Paquita Salas; Celia Freijeiro — Perfect Life; Alba Flores — Money Heist; Aixa Villagrán — Perfect Life

=== Feroz de Honor ===
- Julia Gutiérrez Caba and Emilio Gutiérrez Caba

== See also ==
- 34th Goya Awards
