= 12th Gaudí Awards =

- Date: 19 January 2020
- Site: CCIB's auditorium, Barcelona, Catalonia, Spain
- Hosted by: Anna Moliner
- Organized by: Catalan Film Academy

Highlights
- Best Picture: The Days to Come

The 12th Gaudí Awards, organised by the Catalan Film Academy, were presented on 19 January 2020 at CCIB's Auditorium in Barcelona. Directed by Jordi Prat and produced by Dagoll Dagom, the gala was hosted by Anna Moliner. The nominations were read by Anna Castillo and Oriol Pla on 5 December 2019 at La Pedrera's auditorium.

== Winners and nominees ==
The winners and nominees are listed as follows:

Best Film: The Days to Come; 7 Reasons to Run Away; Staff Only; The Innocence	Bet Non-Catalan Language Film: A Thief's Daughter; The Platform; Liberté; Ojos negros
Best Director: Belén Funes — A Thief's Daughter; Carlos Marques-Marcet — The Days to Come; Lucía Alemany — The Innocence; Neus Ballús — Staff Only	Best Screenplay: Belén Funes, Marçal Cebrian — A Thief's Daughter; Carlos Marques-Marcet, Clara Roquet, Coral Cruz — The Days to Come; Lucía Alemany, Laia Soler — The Innocence; David Desola, Pedro Rivero — The Platform
Best Actress: María Rodríguez Soto — The Days to Come; Aina Clotet — La filla d'algú; Carmen Arrufat — The Innocence; Greta Fernández — A Thief's Daughter	Best Actor: Karra Elejalde — While at War; David Verdaguer — The Days to Come; Eduard Fernández — A Thief's Daughter; Sergi López — Staff Only
Best Production Supervision: Oriol Maymó — Eye for an Eye; Aritz Cirbián, Albert Molins — 7 Reasons to Run Away; Marta Ramírez — A Thief's Daughter; Sergi Moreno, Tono Folguera, Mayca Sanz — The Days to Come	Best Documentary Film: El cuarto reino. El reino de los plásticos; City for Sale; Idrissa. Crònica d'una mort qualsevol; Peret: jo sóc la rumba
Best European Film: Fire Will Come; The Favourite; Happy as Lazzaro; Portrait of a Lady on Fire	Best Short Film: Suc de síndria; Después también; La higuera; Tahrib
Best Television Film: Cathedral of the Sea; Cançó per a tu; L'enigma Verdaguer; La dona del segle	Best Art Direction: Sylvia Steinbrecht — Elisa & Marcela; Ana Pons-Formosa — The Days to Come; Laia Colet — Paradise Hills; Marta Bazaco — A Thief's Daughter
Best Editing: Ana Pfaff, Carlos Marqués-Marcet, Òscar de Gispert — The Days to Come; Bernat Aragonés — A Thief's Daughter; Juliana Montañés — The Innocence; Teresa Font — Pain and Glory	Best Cinematography: Mauro Herce — Fire Will Come; Àlex García — The Days to Come; Gris Jordana — Life Without Sara Amat; Neus Ollé — A Thief's Daughter
Best Supporting Actress: Laia Marull — The Innocence; Aina Clotet — 7 Reasons to Run Away; Julieta Serrano — Pain and Glory; Nora Navas — Pain and Glory	Best Supporting Actor: Enric Auquer — Eye for an Eye; Àlex Brendemühl — Mother; Àlex Monner — A Thief's Daughter; Eduard Fernández — While at War
Best Original Music: Pau Vallvé — Life Without Sara Amat; Maika Makovski — Eye for an Eye; Raül Fernández "Refree" — Ojos negros; Sofía Oriana — Elisa & Marcela	Best Costume Design: Rosa Tharrats — Liberté; Desirée Guirao — A Thief's Daughter; Mercè Paloma — Elisa & Marcela; Vinyet Escobar — Eye for an Eye
Best Sound: Sergio Bürmann, Marc Orts — Pain and Glory; Amanda Villavieja, Albert Manera — Staff Only; Diego Casares, Borja Barrera, Jonathan Darch, Dani Zacarias — The Days to Come; Sergio Rueda, Enrique G. Bermejo, Carlos Jiménez — A Thief's Daughter	Best Visual Effects: Mario Campoy, Irene Río, Iñaki Madariaga — The Platform; Bernat Aragonés — Born a King; Esther Ballesteros, Alex Villagrasa — Paradise Hills; Montse Ribé, Óscar Abades, Eduardo Díaz, Inma Nadela — Pain and Glory
Best Makeup and Hairstyles: Armande Monteiro, Laurence Abraham, Antoine Mancini — Liberté; Elisa Alonso — A Thief's Daughter; Montse Sanfeliu, Paco Rodríguez Frías — Elisa & Marcela; Natalia Montoya — The Innocence

=== Public's Choice Special Award ===
- 7 Reasons to Run Away
  - The Platform
  - Staff Only
  - The Days to Come
  - Ojos negros
  - Liberté
  - The Innocence
  - A Thief's Daughter

=== Honorary Award ===
Filmmaker Francesc Betriu was the recipient of the Gaudí honorary award.
