= 29th Actors and Actresses Union Awards =

2020 Spanish award ceremony

- Date: 9 March 2020
- Site: Circo Price, Madrid, Spain
- Hosted by: Ana Cerdeiriña & Jorge Bedoya
- Organized by: Actors and Actresses Union

Highlights
- Honorary career award: Carmen Maura

The 29th Actors and Actresses Union Awards were held on 9 March 2020 at the Circo Price, in Madrid. The gala was hosted by Ana Cerdeiriña and Jorge Bedoya.

In addition to the competitive awards, Pilar Bardem received the 'Mujeres en Unión' award, Carmen Maura the 'A toda una vida' career award and the writers' union ALMA the Special Award.

== Winners and nominees ==
The winners and nominees are listed as follows:

=== Film ===
Best Male Performance in a Leading Role: Karra Elejalde — While at War; Antonio Banderas — Pain and Glory; Antonio de la Torre — The Endless Trench	Best Female Performance in a Leading Role: Belén Cuesta — The Endless Trench; Marta Nieto — Mother; Penélope Cruz — Pain and Glory
Best Male Performance in a Secondary Role: Asier Etxeandia — Pain and Glory; Nacho Sánchez — Seventeen; Eduard Fernández — While at War	Best Female Performance in a Secondary Role: Nathalie Poza — While at War; Antonia San Juan — The Platform; Inma Cuevas — While at War
Best Male Performance in a Minor Role: Leonardo Sbaraglia — Pain and Glory; David Luque — The Influence; Emilio Palacios — The Endless Trench	Best Female Performance in a Minor Role: Julieta Serrano — Pain and Glory; Mona Martínez — Bye; Susi Sánchez — Pain and Glory

=== Television ===
Best Male Performance in a Leading Role: Javier Cámara — Vota Juan; Javier Gutiérrez — Estoy vivo; Miguel Ángel Silvestre — En el corredor de la muerte	Best Female Performance in a Leading Role: Candela Peña — Hierro; Alba Flores — Money Heist; Toni Acosta — Señoras del (h)AMPA
Best Male Performance in a Secondary Role: Alejo Sauras — Estoy vivo; Alberto Velasco — Locked Up; Enric Auquer — Perfect Life	Best Female Performance in a Secondary Role: Carmen Ruiz — Matadero; Aixa Villagrán — Perfect Life; Nuria Mencía — Vota Juan
Best Male Performance in a Minor Role: Fernando Cayo — Money Heist; Jesús Castejón — Estoy vivo; Manolo Caro — Brigada Costa del Sol	Best Female Performance in a Minor Role: Goizalde Núñez — Estoy vivo; Candela Cruz — La peste; Leonor Watling — Unauthorized Living

=== Theatre ===
Best Male Performance in a Leading Role: Nacho Guerreros — Juguetes rotos; Alberto Berzal — Divinas palabras; Ernesto Alterio — Shock, el cóndor y el puma	Best Female Performance in a Leading Role: Verónica Forqué — Las cosas que sé que son verdad; Adriana Ozores — Los hijos; Aitana Sánchez-Gijón — Juana
Best Male Performance in a Secondary Role: Víctor Clavijo — Lehman trilogy; Jorge Muriel — Las cosas que sé que son verdad; Luis Rallo — Divinas palabras	Best Female Performance in a Secondary Role: Pilar Gómez — Las cosas que sé que son verdad; Esperanza Elipe — Hombres que escriben en habitaciones pequeñas; Lucía Fuengallego — Titus Andronicus
Best Male Performance in a Minor Role: Fran Cantos — Jauría; David Tortosa — El curioso incidente del perro a medianoche; Eduard Alejandre — Gross Indecency	Best Female Performance in a Minor Role: Consuelo Trujillo — La geometría del trigo; Concha Velasco — Metamorfosis; Natalie Pinot — Desatadas

=== Newcomers ===
Best New Actor: Kike Guaza — Juguetes rotos; César Vicente — Pain and Glory; Enric Auquer — Eye for an Eye	Best New Actress: Irene Arcos — El embarcadero; Claudia Salas — La peste; Greta Fernández — Elisa & Marcela

=== International productions ===
Best Male Performance in an International Production: Óscar Jaenada — Hernán; Paco León — The House of Flowers; Jordi Mollà — Jack Ryan	Best Female Performance in an International Production: Ana de Armas — Knives Out; María León — The House of Flowers; Paz Vega — The OA
