= Liberté (2019 film) =

2019 film

- Film poster
- Directed by: Albert Serra
- Written by: Albert Serra
- Starring: Helmut Berger; Marc Susini; Iliana Zabeth; Laura Poulvet; Baptiste Pinteaux; Theodora Marcadé; Alexander García Düttmann; Lluís Serrat; Xavier Pérez; Francesc Daranas; Catalin Jugravu; Montse Triola; Safira Robens
- Cinematography: Artur Tort
- Edited by: Ariadna Ribas
- Release date: 18 May 2019 (Cannes)
- Running time: 132 minutes
- Countries: France; Germany; Portugal; Spain
- Languages: French; German; Italian

Liberté (English: Liberty) is a 2019 drama film written and directed by Albert Serra. Set in the 18th century, it tells the story of a group of libertines that spend a night of sexual debauchery in the forest. An international coproduction, the film had its world premiere in the Un Certain Regard section at the 2019 Cannes Film Festival on 18 May 2019. It was the final film appearance of Helmut Berger before his death in May 2023.

== Plot ==
In the 18th century, libertines spend a night of sexual debauchery in the forest.

== Cast ==
- Helmut Berger as Duc de Walchen
- Marc Susini as Comte de Tésis
- Iliana Zabeth as Mademoiselle de Jensling
- Laura Poulvet as Mademoiselle de Geldöbel
- Baptiste Pinteaux as Duc de Wand
- Theodora Marcadé as Madame de Dumeval
- Alexander García Düttmann as Comte Alexis Danshire
- Lluís Serrat as Armin
- Xavier Pérez as Capitaine Benjamin Hephie
- Francesc Daranas as Libertine
- Catalin Jugravu as Catalin
- Montse Triola as Madame Montavril
- Safira Robens as Mademoiselle de Rubens

== Production ==
The film was preceded by an installation at the Reina Sofia Museum in Madrid and a theater play. For the film, Albert Serra got inspiration from the French painters such as Alexandre-Évariste Fragonard and François Boucher. The cast consists of a mix of professional and non-professional actors.

Initially the scene in which the men pour milk and semen on the totally naked body of Mademoiselle de Jensling, played by Iliana Zabeth, was supposed to be a little different. "In my main scene, for example, I was supposed to be tied up, but not suspended, this was decided later. Then I did a lot of research on shibari. Then other elements were added to the shooting, such as milk. We explored a lot on set," said Zabeth.

Talking about the 'golden shower' scene, director Albert Serra revealed that the guy being urinated on by Theodora Marcadé (playing Madame de Dumeval) and by off-screen participants, wasn't a professional actor. "It's played by the guy who does the post-production of all my films, he came on set especially for that, it's the only time I made a request," Serra said.

The cast consists of a mix of professional and non-professional actors and includes two of the film's technicians. One of them is Laura Poulvet, who is the set decorator but also plays Mademoiselle de Geldöbel's character.

== Release ==
The film had its world premiere in the Un Certain Regard section at the 2019 Cannes Film Festival on 18 May 2019. It was also screened at the Toronto International Film Festival, the New York Film Festival, and the International Film Festival Rotterdam. It was released in France on 4 September 2019.

== Reception ==
=== Critical reception ===
On review aggregator website Rotten Tomatoes, the film holds an approval rating of 71% based on 38 reviews, with an average rating of 6.6/10. The website's critical consensus reads, "It may prove more tedious than titillating for some, but Liberté boldly blurs the line between filmgoer and voyeur." On Metacritic, the film has a weighted average score of 50 out of 100, based on 8 critics, indicating "mixed or average reviews".

Carson Lund of Slant Magazine gave the film 3 out of 4 stars, writing, "Serra's overriding impulse in Liberté is to bask in the atmospheric peculiarities of his fantasized scenario, a drive that places the film in closer proximity to an immersive museum exhibition than to narrative cinema." Leslie Felperin of The Hollywood Reporter commented that "even as pornography, it's not much of a source of joy, and the dialogue is even more risible than some of the worst efforts out of the San Fernando Valley."

=== Accolades ===
| Award | Year of ceremony | Category | Recipient(s) | Result | Ref(s) |
|---|---|---|---|---|---|
| Cannes Film Festival | 2019 | Special Jury Prize: Un Certain Regard | Liberté | Won | |
| Gaudí Awards | 2020 | Best Costume Design | Rosa Tharrats | Won | |
| Gaudí Awards | 2020 | Best Makeup and Hairstyles | Antoine Mancini, Armande Monteiro, and Laurence Abraham Yaeger | Won | |
| Gaudí Awards | 2020 | Best Non-Catalan Language Film | Liberté | Nominated | |
