= The Platform (film) =

2019 film by Galder Gaztelu-Urrutia

- Theatrical release poster
- Spanish: El hoyo
- Literally: The Hole
- Directed by: Galder Gaztelu-Urrutia
- Screenplay by: David Desola; Pedro Rivero
- Story by: David Desola
- Produced by: Carlos Juárez
- Starring: Iván Massagué; Antonia San Juan; Zorion Eguileor; Emilio Buale; Alexandra Masangkay
- Cinematography: Jon D. Domínguez
- Edited by: Haritz Zubillaga; Elena Ruiz
- Music by: Aranzazu Calleja
- Production companies: Basque Films; Mr. Miyagi Films; Plataforma La Película A.I.E
- Distributed by: Festival Films
- Release dates: 6 September 2019 (TIFF); 8 November 2019 (Spain)
- Running time: 94 minutes
- Country: Spain
- Language: Spanish
- Box office: $1.1 million

The Platform (Spanish: El hoyo, lit. 'The Hole') is a 2019 Spanish dystopian thriller film directed by Galder Gaztelu-Urrutia. The film is set in a large, industrial tower named the "Vertical Self-Management Center" that houses criminal convicts. Every month, prisoners switch between the tower's many floors and are fed by a vertically moving platform with food on it. The platform is initially filled with large amounts of food, and gradually descends through the tower's levels, stopping for a fixed amount of time on each floor. Since the residents of each floor tend to eat as much food as they can, those on the lower floors are unable to eat as much food as those at the top, leading to conflict.

The film's cast includes Iván Massagué, Antonia San Juan, Zorion Eguileor, Emilio Buale Coka and Alexandra Masangkay. It premiered at the 2019 Toronto International Film Festival (TIFF), where it won the People's Choice Award for Midnight Madness. At TIFF, the film also secured a worldwide streaming deal with Netflix. It was released theatrically in Spain on 8 November 2019 by Festival Films. It received generally positive reviews from critics.

== Plot ==
A man named Goreng awakens in a cell numbered 48. His cellmate Trimagasi explains that they are in a tower-style holding facility. Once per day, food arrives on "the platform" that lowers from level 0, stopping for two minutes on each level. Prisoners can eat only while the platform is stopped on their level, and are subjected to fatal temperatures if they keep any food. Prisoners are randomly reassigned to a new level each month. Trimagasi reveals that when assigned to level 132, he and his former cellmate cannibalized someone. One day, a woman named Miharu rides down the platform, whom Trimagasi explains regularly descends the pit to search for her child. Goreng explains that he volunteered to spend six months in the facility in exchange for a diploma, while Trimagasi confides that he is serving a year-long sentence for manslaughter.

The following month, they are reassigned to level 171. Trimagasi ties up Goreng and explains his plans to feed himself using Goreng's flesh. When he begins cutting into Goreng's leg, Miharu arrives, attacks Trimagasi, and frees Goreng, who kills Trimagasi. Encouraged by Miharu, Goreng eats Trimagasi's flesh and subsequently becomes haunted by hallucinations of Trimagasi.

The next month, Goreng wakes on level 33 with a woman named Imoguiri and her dog, Ramesses II. Imoguiri was the administration official who interviewed Goreng before sending him to the pit, having admitted herself after being diagnosed with terminal cancer. Imoguiri only eats every other day, letting Ramesses II eat on the days that she does not, and tries unsuccessfully to convince the pair below them to ration their food. One day, Miharu arrives injured. Goreng and Imoguiri nurse her back to health. That night, Goreng breaks up a fight between Miharu and Imoguiri to then discover that Miharu has killed Ramesses II. After Miharu leaves, Goreng mentions her child to Imoguiri, who says there are no children in the pit and Miharu came alone. The following morning, Goreng wakes to find that they have been reassigned to level 202 and that Imoguiri has hanged herself. He consumes her flesh, plagued with hallucinations of his former cellmates.

The next month, Goreng is assigned to level 6. His new cellmate, Baharat, is a religious man who has been attempting to escape the pit for months. Estimating that there are 250 levels, Goreng convinces Baharat to ride the platform down with him and ration the food. They forbid anyone on the first fifty levels to receive any, arguing that they get to eat every day, and fend off those who defy them. Fellow prisoner Sr. Brambang advises them that civility is more effective than violence and convinces them to send a symbolic message to the administration by leaving a single panna cotta untouched.

As they descend further, they hand out portions to the prisoners, attacking those who refuse to cooperate. They encounter Miharu being attacked and try to save her, but she is killed and they are both left severely injured. Goreng and Baharat continue to descend, eventually stopping at level 333, where Goreng notices a child whom he deduces is Miharu's daughter. They get off the platform, letting it continue downward, and reluctantly feed the girl the panna cotta.

That night, Baharat shakes Goreng awake and tells him, "The girl is the message." Goreng awakens, revealing this encounter to have been a dream, and finds that the real Baharat has bled to death. Goreng and the girl ride the platform to the very bottom level. Goreng once again hallucinates Trimagasi, who encourages him to get off the platform. Goreng insists that he has to ride the platform back up to the top, as he is the bearer of the "message," but Trimagasi replies, "The message requires no bearer." Goreng gets off the platform and the two walk away, watching as the child ascends.

== Cast ==
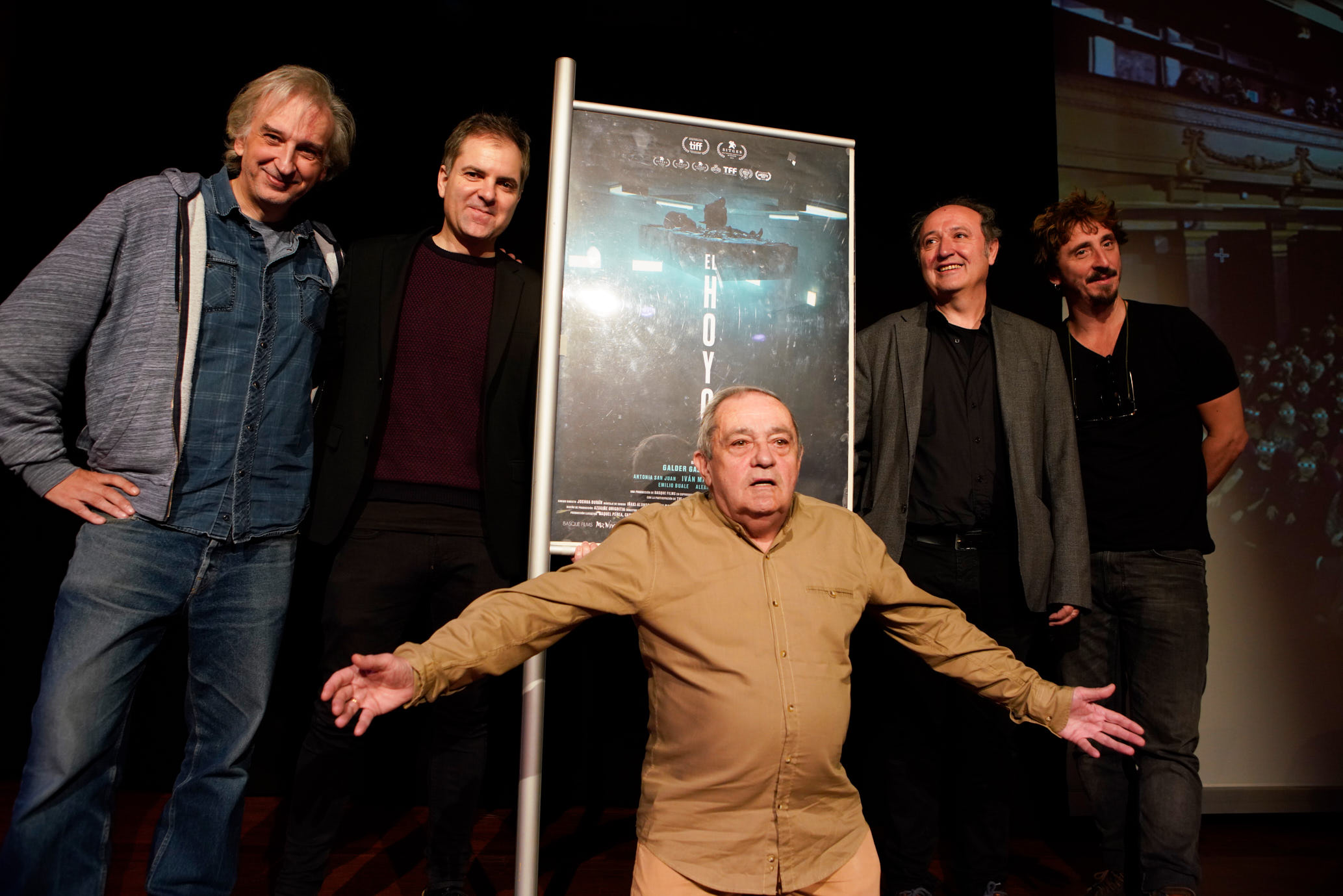
Cast and crew members at a press conference in October 2019

- Iván Massagué as Goreng
- Zorion Eguileor as Trimagasi
- Antonia San Juan as Imoguiri
- Emilio Buale as Baharat
- Alexandra Masangkay as Miharu
- Zihara Llana as Mali (Miharu’s daughter)
- Eric L. Goode as Sr. Brambang
- Mario Pardo as Baharat's friend
- Txubio Fernández de Jáuregui as Chef

== Production ==
The film was produced by Basque Films alongside Mr. Miyagi Films and Plataforma la película AIE, with the participation of RTVE and ETB and support from ICAA, the Basque administration, and ICO. Shooting lasted for six weeks.

Galder Gaztelu-Urrutia says the film's key message is that "humanity will have to move towards the fair distribution of wealth", exploring the importance of individual initiative in driving political change. The screenplay is adapted from a theatre script by David Desola and Pedro Rivero, to which more action and physical elements were added to make it more suitable for a film. "Extensive" rewriting was required to convert the unproduced theater script into a screenplay. The director said it was a "torturous ordeal", as the writers defended their artistic vision and did not want some of the changes to be made.

The concrete prison cells were built for the production in a Red Cross facility in a port in Bilbao. The director asked for cells that looked "economical, robust, [and] impregnable", which emphasized a sense of architectural and engineering proportion. Only two tiers of concrete cells were built; the appearance of many tiers of cells extending above and below each cell (visible from the hole in the center of each cell) was added in post-production using visual effects. The director says the vertical tower of cells "represents the dehumanized coldness of the Vertical Self-Management Center".

The director states that the film's lavish "food was treated as another character in the story, one that is aesthetically antagonistic to the architecture of the prison." The luxurious displays of gourmet food were presented on "Versailles worthy tableware" to depict "excessive, almost erotic, opulent desire" that is eventually "desecrated" once the near-empty platform reaches the abject, starving inmates on the lower levels.

The director acknowledges the film can be difficult to watch, but he says the purpose of this approach is to generate discussion and debate by viewers about the political messages. When asked about the film's brutal violence and cannibalism, the director explained that the prison "is a reflection of our society, [so] it couldn’t hide the violence. It had to show how we rip each other apart."

The film uses two actors cast against type; Iván Massagué and Antonia San Juan, both of whom are known for their comedic roles. The pair were chosen to lighten the film's weighty subject by adding "humour, irony, and surrealism". The film was shot chronologically, as the main actor Iván had to lose 12 kg (26 lbs) over the six-week shoot in order to display his character's physical deterioration.

== Release ==
The film was released in Spain on 8 November 2019 by Festival Films. The Platform was released onto Netflix internationally (including Spain) on 20 March 2020. In July 2020, Netflix revealed the film had been watched by 56 million households over its first four weeks of release, among the highest viewing figures ever for one of their original films.

== Reception ==
=== Critical response ===
On review aggregator Rotten Tomatoes, the film holds an approval rating of 81% based on 99 reviews, with an average rating of 7.3/10. The site's critical consensus reads: "While it may feel muddled at times, The Platform is an inventive and captivating dystopian thriller." On Metacritic, the film has a weighted average score of 73 out of 100, based on 15 critics, indicating "generally favourable reviews".

Norman Wilner of Now correctly predicted that the film would win the People's Choice Award, giving it a five-N rating and writing that the film "has everything: low comedy, political allegory, left-field twists, crowd-pleasing surprises, spectacular violence, sadism, altruism, and yet more spectacular violence, all wrapped up in a high-concept horror film that moves the premise of Cube into a merciless vertical structure. It’s grotesque and compelling, like grindhouse Buñuel. And it never blinks."

Amy Nicholson of Variety wrote that "the film’s minimalist fury feels like the plays of Samuel Beckett. Massagué and Eguileor are up to being in a zesty Waiting for Godot. And Eguileor's nasty, delightful, occasionally tender performance feels like an audition to play a Bond villain, or perhaps the Spanish resurrection of Hannibal Lecter."

The film garnered new reviews after a surge in popularity during the COVID-19 pandemic. Sam Jones in The Guardian suggested it was "the perfect parable for life in the time of the coronavirus and a visceral investigation of how a crisis can expose not only the stratification of human society but also the immutable strands of selfishness coded into our DNA."

=== Accolades ===
Year	Award	Category	Nominee(s)	Result	Ref.
2020	7th Feroz Awards	Best Drama Film		Nominated	
2020	7th Feroz Awards	Best Director	Galder Gaztelu-Urrutia	Nominated	
2020	7th Feroz Awards	Best Screenplay	David Desola, Pedro Rivero	Nominated	
2020	7th Feroz Awards	Best Supporting Actress	Antonia San Juan	Nominated	
2020	7th Feroz Awards	Best Film Poster		Nominated	
2020	7th Feroz Awards	Best Trailer		Nominated	
2020	12th Gaudí Awards	Best Non-Catalan Language Film		Nominated	
2020	12th Gaudí Awards	Best Screenplay	David Desola, Pedro Rivero	Nominated	
2020	12th Gaudí Awards	Best Visual Effects	Mario Campoy, Irene Río, Iñaki Madariaga	Won	
2020	75th CEC Medals	Best New Director	Galder Gaztelu-Urrutia	Nominated	
2020	34th Goya Awards	Best Original Screenplay	David Desola, Pedro Rivero	Nominated	
2020	34th Goya Awards	Best New Director	Galder Gaztelu-Urrutia	Nominated	
2020	34th Goya Awards	Best Special Effects	Mario Campoy, Iñaki Madariaga	Won	
2020	29th Actors and Actresses Union Awards	Best Film Actress in a Secondary Role	Antonia San Juan	Nominated	
2020	33rd European Film Awards	Best Visual Effects	Iñaki Madariaga	Won	

== Prequel ==
Discussions around a potential sequel took place after the film's streaming success in 2020. In May 2023, Netflix reported the beginning of filming of The Platform 2, with Galder Gaztelu-Urrutia returning as director and starring Hovik Keuchkerian and Milena Smit. In July 2024, Netflix released the first trailer for the film and the movie was released on October 4, 2024.

== See also ==
- List of Spanish films of 2019
