= While at War =

Spanish-Argentine war drama film

- Theatrical release poster
- Spanish: Mientras dure la guerra
- Directed by: Alejandro Amenábar
- Written by: Alejandro Amenábar; Alejandro Hernández
- Produced by: Fernando Bovaira; Domingo Corral; Hugo Sigman; Alejandro Amenábar
- Starring: Karra Elejalde; Eduard Fernández; Santi Prego; Luis Bermejo; Tito Valverde; Patricia López Arnaiz; Inma Cuevas; Carlos Serrano-Clark; Luis Zahera; Ainhoa Santamaría; Mireia Ruiz; Luis Callejo; Dafnis Balduz; Jorge Andreu; Nathalie Poza
- Cinematography: Alex Catalán
- Edited by: Carolina Martínez Urbina
- Music by: Alejandro Amenábar
- Production companies: Movistar+ MOD Producciones; Himenóptero; K&S Films; Mientras Dure La Guerra A.I.E.
- Distributed by: Buena Vista International
- Release dates: 6 September 2019 (Toronto); 27 September 2019 (Spain)
- Running time: 107 minutes
- Countries: Spain; Argentina
- Language: Spanish
- Budget: €6.4 million
- Box office: €11 million

While at War (Spanish: Mientras dure la guerra) is a 2019 historical drama film directed by Alejandro Amenábar. Set in 1936, during the Spanish Civil War, the plot tracks the plight and moral shift of philosopher and writer Miguel de Unamuno (portrayed by Karra Elejalde) in Salamanca, a city controlled by the Rebel faction, as his acquaintances are detained and go missing amid the Francoist rearguard repression. It is a Spanish-Argentine co-production.

It premiered at the 44th Toronto International Film Festival in September 2019 ahead of its 27 September 2019 theatrical release in Spain by Buena Vista International. It won Best Art Direction, Production Supervision, Costume Design, and Makeup and Hairstyles at the 34th Goya Awards.

== Plot ==
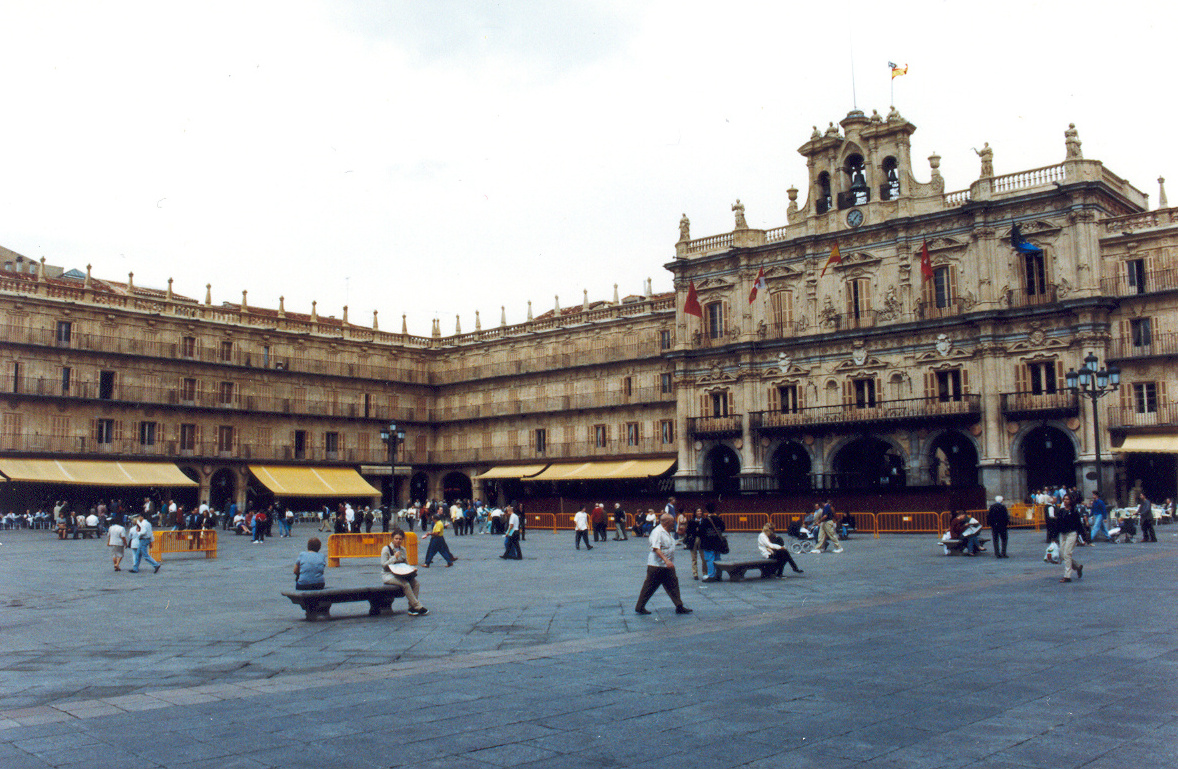
Some footage was shot at Salamanca's Plaza Mayor.

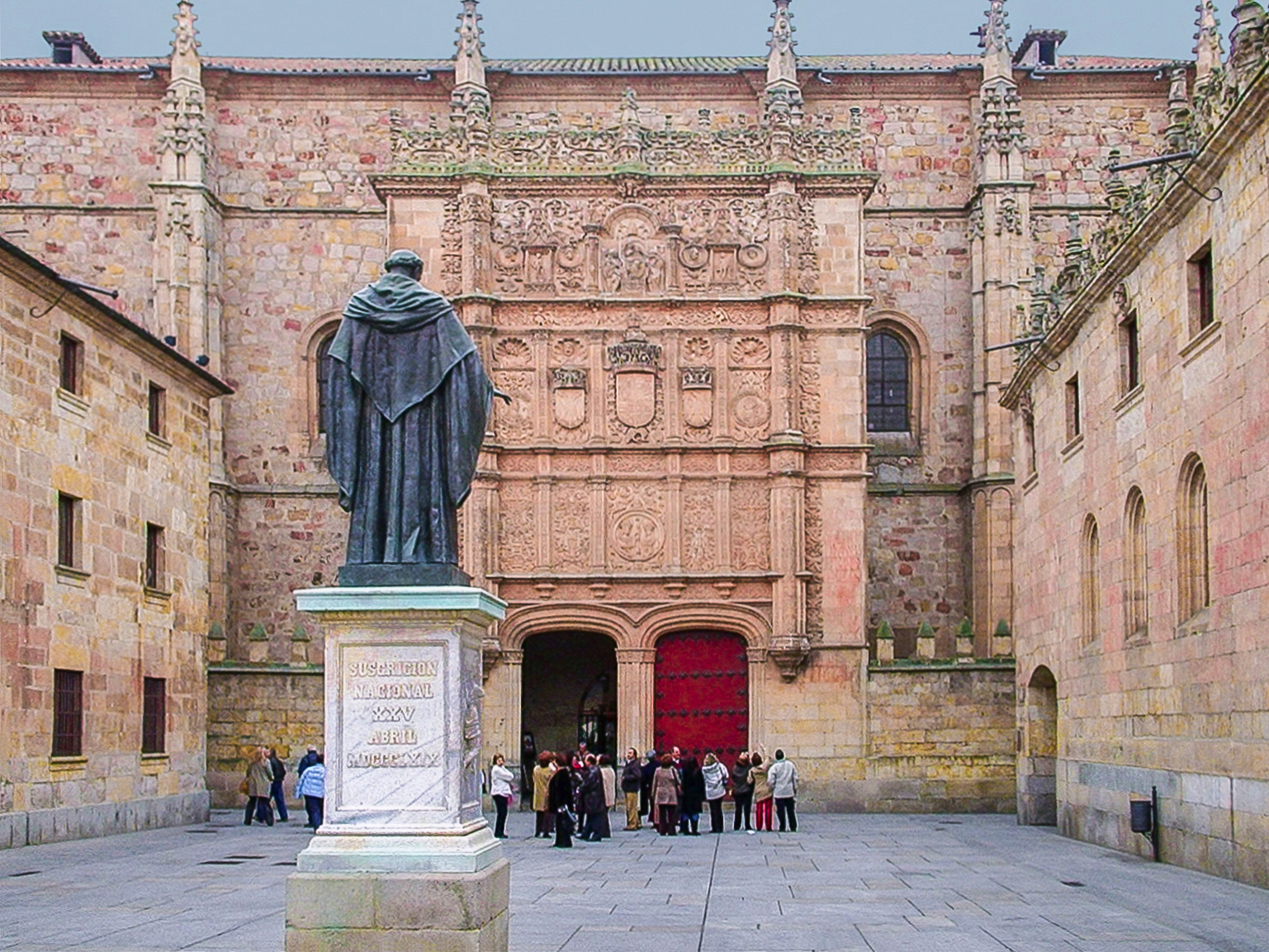
The buildings of the university also appear in the film.

During the Spanish coup of July 1936, Nationalist troops occupy Salamanca. In the process, the city's Socialist mayor is arrested. Revered author Miguel de Unamuno convenes with two colleagues, Protestant pastor and freemason Atilano Coco and left-leaning professor Salvador Vila; they discuss the coup briefly, after which Unamuno leaves for an interview to publicly support the coup. During the interview, the mayor's wife interrupts to ask him to intervene regarding her husband's imprisonment; Unamuno offers monetary assistance instead, which she rejects.

Meanwhile, in Spanish Morocco, a German delegation meets with General Francisco Franco to pressure the formation of a single Nationalist leader following the death of General José Sanjurjo. Franco maintains that the Burgos junta holds power, even as his collaborators pressure him to take leadership. Back in Salamanca, Unamuno is removed from his position as rector at the University of Salamanca by the government of the Second Spanish Republic in response to his support of the coup. Unamuno meets with Atilano and Salvador again, with the meeting culminating in a heated argument from which Coco leaves. Unamuno later goes to Coco's residence to speak with him, only to find that he is not there. Elsewhere, General José Millán-Astray meets with Franco in Cáceres, while the junta in Burgos reinstates Unamuno as rector of the university, where he finds that he has been prompted to write a manifesto supporting the coup, a task he rejects. Unamuno attempts to meet with Atilano but his wife Enriqueta reveals that he had been taken into Nationalist custody days prior. Unamuno meets with Salvador, who attempts to convince him of the fascist nature of the coup.

Meanwhile, Millán-Astray urges Franco to relieve the Siege of the Alcázar in Toledo, but is rebuffed on strategic grounds—allocating resources to relieve the siege rather than going all in with the direct assault on Madrid would delay the war's end by years. Millán-Astray pressures Franco to assume leadership, a proposal Franco once again rejects. Later, Franco replaces the Republic's flag on his headquarters with the old monarchist flag, stirring discontent within the junta. The junta then arrive in Salamanca to meet with Franco, with whom Unamuno is called to meet. Unamuno attempts to plead for Coco's release, and is told that his case will be reviewed. Unamuno is then quietly confronted by Millán-Astray about his unwillingness to sign the manifesto, leaving Unamuno to make a decision. The junta leave to hold a vote on the leadership question, during which Millán-Astray exhorts his colleagues to vote for Franco. At the same time, the administration of the University of Salamanca meet regarding the manifesto. Unamuno assents and signs, while Franco is voted in as commander-in-chief. While leaving the meeting, Unamuno is met by Coco's wife, who presents him a letter testifying to her husband's innocence. Meanwhile, strategic caveats notwithstanding, Franco becomes determined to relieve the siege of the Alcázar, confessing to his brother Nicolás that he considered that a long war of attrition was necessary to cleanse the country anyway.

Unamuno goes for a walk along the road to Zamora with the company of Salvador, with whom he debates regarding the war in the countryside. On the way back home, Salvador is accosted and arrested, leaving Unamuno to walk back alone in the rain. He slips into a delirious state for several days, after which he attempts to make a personal appeal to Franco and his wife Carmen Polo to have his colleagues released; the attempt fails, and Unamuno, anguished, informs Coco's wife. Meanwhile, Millán-Astray confronts Unamuno once again and informs him that he will be taking Franco's place in a Nationalist event at the university the following day. At the event, Unamuno initially refuses to speak, though he changes his mind after reading Coco's wife's letter. He presents a speech criticizing the nationalists, causing the crowd to turn on him, thereby forcing him out. An epilogue details the fates of several of the figures in the film, including the facts that Atilano and Salvador were both executed without trials, and that Unamuno was dismissed as Dean following his speech and died of a heart attack two months later.

== Cast ==
- Karra Elejalde as Miguel de Unamuno
- Eduard Fernández as José Millán-Astray
- Santi Prego as Francisco Franco
- Nathalie Poza as Ana Carrasco
- Patricia López Arnaiz as María de Unamuno
- Luis Zahera as Atilano Coco
- Luis Bermejo as Nicolás Franco
- Inma Cuevas as Felisa de Unamuno
- Mireia Rey as Carmen Polo
- Tito Valverde as General Cabanellas
- Luis Callejo as General Mola
- Carlos Serrano-Clark as Salvador Vila
- Ainhoa Santamaría as Enriqueta Carbonell
- Itziar Aizpuru
- Pep Tosar as Enrique Pla y Deniel
- Miquel García Borda as General Kindelán
- Dafnis Balduz
- Jorge Andreu
- Martina Cariddi as Concha
- Mariano Llorente as Casto Prieto

== Production ==
The film is a Spanish-Argentine co-production by Movistar+, MOD Producciones, Himenóptero, K&S Films, and Mientras dure la guerra AIE and it had the backing of ICAA and INCAA. It had a reported budget of €6.38 million.

== Release ==
The film had its world premiere on 6 September 2019, at the Toronto International Film Festival. The film was also included in the official selection of the 67th San Sebastián International Film Festival.

Distributed by Buena Vista International, the film was released in cinemas in Spain on 27 September 2019.

Tentative plans for a theatrical distribution in Argentina under Warner Bros. Pictures were shelved following the onset of the COVID-19 pandemic and the film was eventually made available in the country on HBO Max.

== Reception ==
=== Box office ===
The film grossed around €11 million in its theatrical run, and became the fourth highest grossing local release in the 2019 Spanish box office.

=== Critical response ===
On the review aggregator Rotten Tomatoes, the film has an approval rating of 64% based on 22 reviews, with an average rating of 7/10. On Metacritic, the film has a score of 55 out of 100, based on 4 critics, indicating "mixed or average reviews".

Carlos Boyero of El País found the film to be "a good, restrained and also daring film, told with both brains and heart". Fionnuala Halligan of ScreenDaily deemed While at War to be a "complex, steady, deeply intelligent film with a chilling resonance today", commending how, "careful and composed, it never stoops to simplification". Marta Medina of El Confidencial rated the film 2 out of 5 stars, declaring it to be "more like a history lesson than a dramatic narrative", featuring "an innocuous, unambitious narrative which, moreover, suffers from a lack of imagination in its formal aspect".

Dennis Harvey of Variety gave it a mixed review and wrote: "This is a worthy enterprise that errs on the side of caution, carrying the slightly stale whiff of awards-bait cinema in which greatness is frequently signaled but inspiration somehow lacking." Jonathan Holland of The Hollywood Reporter called it "Ambitious in scope, carefully crafted and featuring several fine performances" but was in the final impression felt that the film had been limited by its faithfulness to the book.

=== Millán-Astray controversy ===
The Plataforma Patriótica Millán-Astray (Millán-Astray Patriotic Platform), an organization of veterans of the Spanish Legion, accused the script writers of plagiarism of the 1941 work Unamuno's Last Lecture by Luis Portillo, a text the organization claims is defamatory towards José Millán-Astray, founder of the Spanish Legion. The accusation was based on the content of the official trailers. The organization demanded the return of the public funds received for the making of the film.

=== Accolades ===
| Year | Award | Category | Nominee(s) | Result | Ref. |
|---|---|---|---|---|---|
| 2020 | 25th Forqué Awards | Best Film | | Nominated | |
| 2020 | 25th Forqué Awards | Best Actor | Karra Elejalde | Nominated | |
| 2020 | 7th Feroz Awards | Best Main Actor in a Film | Karra Elejalde | Nominated | |
| 2020 | 7th Feroz Awards | Best Supporting Actor in a Film | Eduard Fernández | Nominated | |
| 2020 | 7th Feroz Awards | Best Original Soundtrack | Alejandro Amenábar | Nominated | |
| 2020 | 7th Feroz Awards | Best Trailer | Rafa Martínez | Nominated | |
| 2020 | 12th Gaudí Awards | Best Actor | Karra Elejalde | Won | |
| 2020 | 12th Gaudí Awards | Best Supporting Actor | Eduard Fernández | Nominated | |
| 2020 | 75th CEC Medals | Best Film | | Nominated | |
| 2020 | 75th CEC Medals | Best Director | Alejandro Amenábar | Nominated | |
| 2020 | 75th CEC Medals | Best Actor | Karra Elejalde | Nominated | |
| 2020 | 75th CEC Medals | Best Supporting Actor | Eduard Fernández | Won | |
| 2020 | 75th CEC Medals | Best New Actor | Santi Prego | Nominated | |
| 2020 | 75th CEC Medals | Best Original Screenplay | Alejandro Amenábar, Alejandro Hernández | Nominated | |
| 2020 | 75th CEC Medals | Best Cinematography | Alex Catalán | Nominated | |
| 2020 | 75th CEC Medals | Best Editing | Carolina Martínez Urbina | Nominated | |
| 2020 | 34th Goya Awards | Best Film | | Nominated | |
| 2020 | 34th Goya Awards | Best Director | Alejandro Amenábar | Nominated | |
| 2020 | 34th Goya Awards | Best Actor | Karra Elejalde | Nominated | |
| 2020 | 34th Goya Awards | Best Supporting Actor | Eduard Fernández | Won | |
| 2020 | 34th Goya Awards | Best Supporting Actress | Nathalie Poza | Nominated | |
| 2020 | 34th Goya Awards | Best New Actor | Santi Prego | Nominated | |
| 2020 | 34th Goya Awards | Best New Actress | Ainhoa Santamaría | Nominated | |
| 2020 | 34th Goya Awards | Best Original Screenplay | Alejandro Amenábar, Alejandro Hernández | Nominated | |
| 2020 | 34th Goya Awards | Best Cinematography | Alex Catalán | Nominated | |
| 2020 | 34th Goya Awards | Best Editing | Carolina Martínez Urbina | Nominated | |
| 2020 | 34th Goya Awards | Best Art Direction | Juan Pedro de Gaspar | Won | |
| 2020 | 34th Goya Awards | Best Production Supervision | Carla Pérez de Álbeniz | Won | |
| 2020 | 34th Goya Awards | Best Sound | Aitor Berenguer, Gabriel Gutiérrez | Nominated | |
| 2020 | 34th Goya Awards | Best Special Effects | Raúl Romanillos, Juanma Nogales | Nominated | |
| 2020 | 34th Goya Awards | Best Costume Design | Sonia Grande | Won | |
| 2020 | 34th Goya Awards | Best Makeup and Hairstyles | Ana López-Puigcerver, Belén López-Puigcerver and Nacho Díaz | Won | |
| 2020 | 34th Goya Awards | Best Original Score | Alejandro Amenábar | Nominated | |
| 2020 | 29th Actors and Actresses Union Awards | Best Film Actor in a Leading Role | Karra Elejalde | Won | |
| 2020 | 29th Actors and Actresses Union Awards | Best Film Actress in a Secondary Role | Nathalie Poza | Won | |
| 2020 | 29th Actors and Actresses Union Awards | Best Film Actress in a Secondary Role | Inma Cuevas | Nominated | |
| 2020 | 29th Actors and Actresses Union Awards | Best Film Actor in a Secondary Role | Eduard Fernández | Nominated | |
| 2020 | 7th Platino Awards | Best Director | Alejandro Amenábar | Nominated | |
| 2020 | 7th Platino Awards | Best Actor (film) | Karra Elejalde | Nominated | |
| 2020 | 7th Platino Awards | Best Screenplay | Alejandro Amenábar, Alejandro Hernández | Nominated | |
| 2020 | 7th Platino Awards | Best Original Score | Alejandro Amenábar | Nominated | |
| 2020 | 7th Platino Awards | Best Cinematography | Alex Catalán | Nominated | |
| 2020 | 7th Platino Awards | Best Art Direction | Juan Pedro de Gaspar | Won | |
| 2020 | 7th Platino Awards | Best Sound | Aitor Berenguer, Gabriel Gutiérrez | Nominated | |
| 2022 | 70th Silver Condor Awards | Best Film in Co-Production with Argentina | | Nominated | |

== See also ==
- List of Spanish films of 2019
