= Sylvia Steinbrecht =

Andorran designer (born 1977)

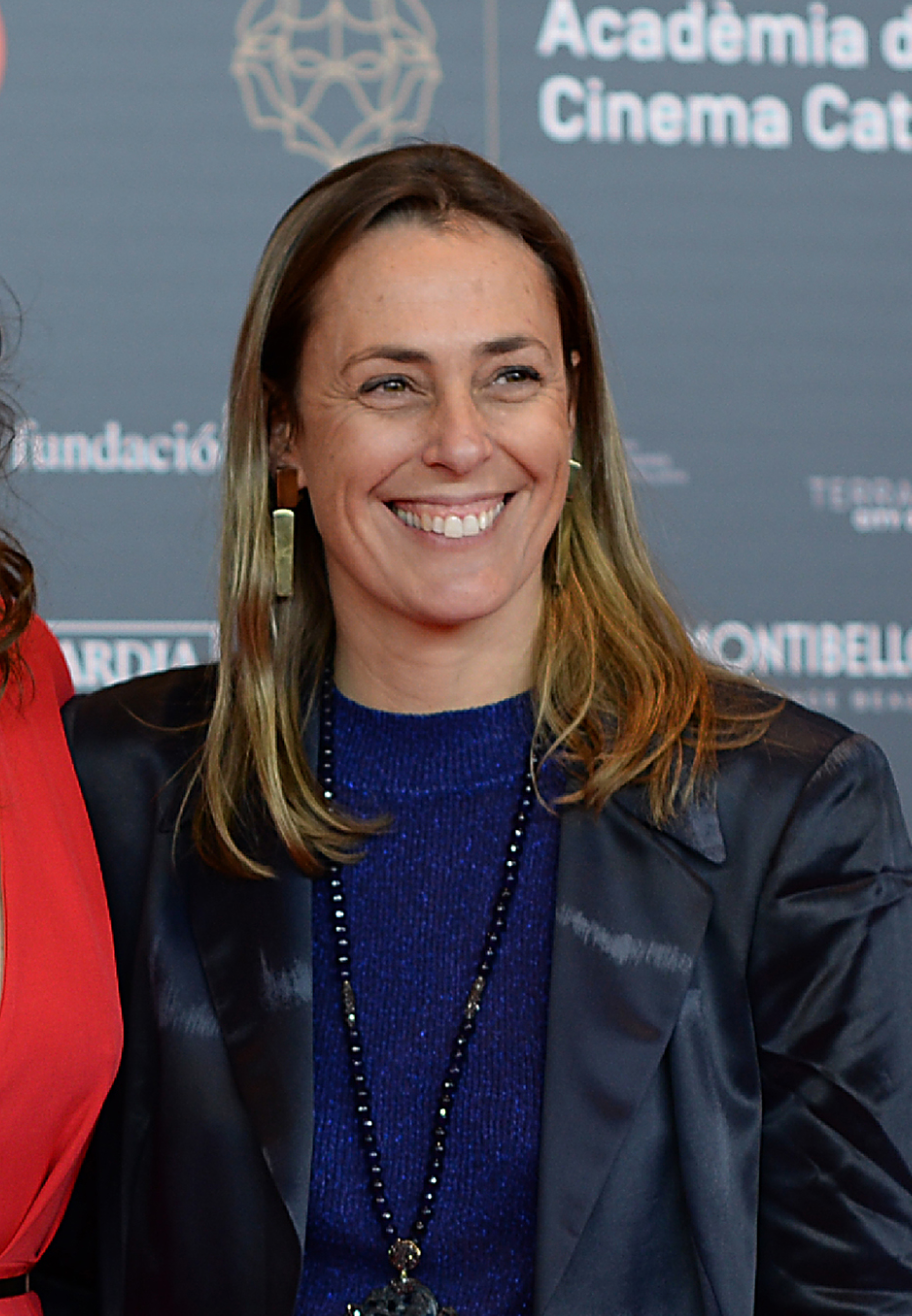
- Steinbrecht at the Gaudí Awards in 2020
- Born: 1977 (age 48–49); Bern, Switzerland
- Citizenship: Andorra
- Education: Cinema and Audiovisual School of Catalonia, University of Barcelona
- Children: 2
- Awards: Gaudí Award for Best Art Direction (2020)

Sylvia Steinbrecht Aleix (born 1977) is an Andorran artistic director and production designer of Swiss origin. She has worked with directors including Brad Anderson, Woody Allen, Isabel Coixet, Cesc Gay, Alejandro González Iñárritu, Ramón Salazar and Tom Tykwer. She is a winner of the Gaudí Award for Best Art Direction.

== Career ==
Steinbrecht was born in 1977 in Bern, Switzerland. She studied at the Cinema and Audiovisual School of Catalonia (ESCAC), part of the University of Barcelona, graduating from the second class.

In 2004, Steinbrecht was set decorator for The Machinist.

In 2008, Steinbrecht worked as set director for Woody Allen's Vicky Cristina Barcelona.

In 2013, Steinbrecht won the Best Art Direction award at the Global Nonviolent Film Festival for her work on the live action/animated adventure film Snowflake, the White Gorilla.

In 2020, Steinbrecht won the Gaudí Award for Best Art Direction at the 12th Gaudí Awards for Elisa & Marcela.

Steinbrechy was nominated again for the Gaudí Award for her work on Los renglones torcidos de Dios, for which she was also nominated for the Goya Award for Best Art Direction at the 37th Goya Awards.

In 2023, Steinbrecht was production designer for Creatura, which won Europa Cinemas Best European Film Prize. She was nominated at the 16th Gaudí Awards for her work on Creatura.
