= A Thief's Daughter =

- Film poster
- Spanish: La hija de un ladrón
- Directed by: Belén Funes
- Written by: Marçal Cebrian; Belén Funes
- Produced by: Antonio Chavarrías
- Starring: Greta Fernández; Eduard Fernández; Àlex Monner
- Cinematography: Neus Ollé
- Edited by: Bernat Aragonés
- Distributed by: BTeam Pictures
- Release dates: 25 September 2019 (Zinemaldia); 29 November 2019 (Spain)
- Running time: 102 minutes
- Country: Spain
- Language: Spanish

A Thief's Daughter (Spanish: La hija de un ladrón) is a 2019 Spanish drama film directed by Belén Funes, starring Greta and Eduard Fernández.

The film was nominated for two Goya Awards with Funes winning award for Best New Director.

== Cast ==
- Greta Fernández as Sara
- Eduard Fernández as Manuel
- Àlex Monner as Dani
- Tomás Martín as Martín
- Adela Silvestre as Noe
- Borja Espinosa as Borja
- Frank Feys as Marcel

== Release ==
Distributed by BTeam Pictures, it was released theatrically in Spain on 29 November 2019.

== Reception ==
A Thief's Daughter received positive reviews from film critics. It holds a 92% approval rating on review aggregator website Rotten Tomatoes, based on 13 reviews with an average rating of 8/10.

Andrea G. Bermejo of Cinemanía rated the film 4 out of 5 stars, finding similarities with the filmography of the Dardenne brothers and the gaze of Isaki Lacuesta and Isa Campo.

== Accolades ==
Year	Award	Category	Nominee(s)	Result	Ref.
2019	67th San Sebastián International Film Festival	Silver Shell for Best Actress	Greta Fernández	Won	
2020	7th Feroz Awards	Best Actress	Greta Fernández	Nominated	
2020	12th Gaudí Awards	Best Non-Catalan Language Film		Won	
2020	12th Gaudí Awards	Best Director	Belén Funes	Won	
2020	12th Gaudí Awards	Best Screenplay	Belén Funes, Marçal Cebrián	Won	
2020	12th Gaudí Awards	Best Actress	Greta Fernández	Nominated	
2020	12th Gaudí Awards	Best Actor	Eduard Fernández	Nominated	
2020	12th Gaudí Awards	Best Production Supervision	Marta Ramírez	Nominated	
2020	12th Gaudí Awards	Best Art Direction	Marta Bazaco	Nominated	
2020	12th Gaudí Awards	Best Editing	Bernat Aragonés	Nominated	
2020	12th Gaudí Awards	Best Supporting Actor	Àlex Monner	Nominated	
2020	12th Gaudí Awards	Best Cinematography	Neus Ollé	Nominated	
2020	12th Gaudí Awards	Best Costume Design	Desirée Guirao	Nominated	
2020	12th Gaudí Awards	Best Sound	Sergio Rueda, Enrique G. Bermejo, Carlos Jiménez	Nominated	
2020	12th Gaudí Awards	Best Makeup and Hairstyles	Elisa Alonso	Nominated	
2020	75th CEC Medals	Best New Director	Belén Funes	Nominated	
2020	75th CEC Medals	Best Actress	Greta Fernández	Nominated	
2020	75th CEC Medals	Best New Actress	Greta Fernández	Won	
2020	34th Goya Awards	Best Actress	Greta Fernández	Nominated	
2020	34th Goya Awards	Best New Director	Belén Funes	Won	

== See also ==
- List of Spanish films of 2019
