= Maria Rodríguez Soto =

Spanish actress

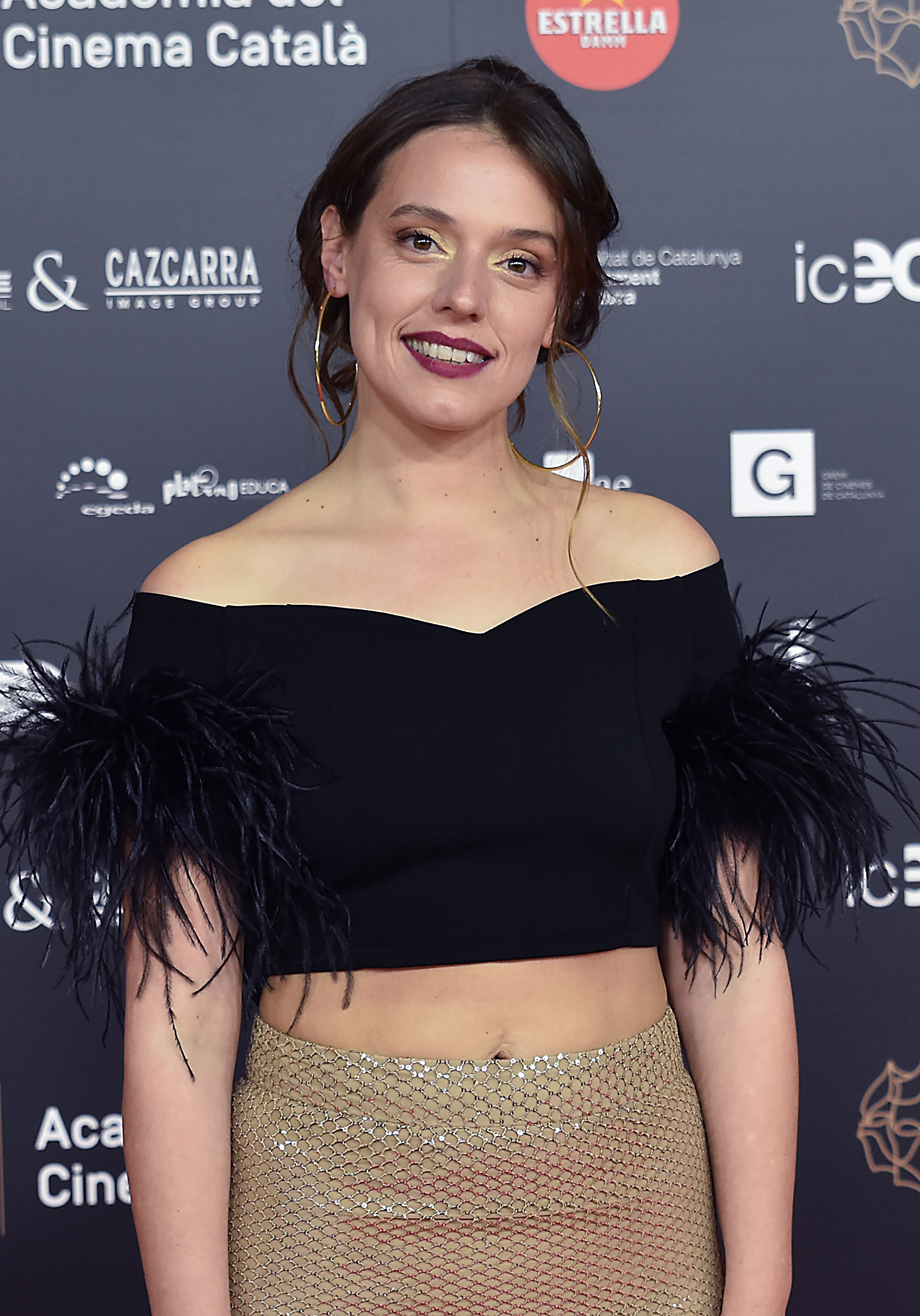
- Rodríguez Soto in 2021
- Born: 1986 (age 39–40); Barcelona, Catalonia, Spain
- Other names: María Rodríguez Soto; María Rodríguez
- Education: Institut del Teatre

Maria Rodríguez Soto (born 1986) is a Spanish actress from Catalonia. She has featured in films such as The Days to Come, Mamifera, and A House on Fire.

== Life and career ==
Maria Rodríguez Soto was born in Barcelona in 1986. She earned a degree in dramatic art from the Institut del Teatre. Some of her stage credits include performances in Misteri de dolor, L'habitació blava, Victòria d'Enric V, and Una gossa en un descampat.

Early film credits include appearances in Animals and 100 Meters, while she also worked in television series such as El ministerio del tiempo (portraying Enriqueta Martí, the vampire of the Raval), and Heirs to the Land (portraying Regina).

Her portrayal of the pregnant woman Vir in The Days to Come (2019) won her the Best Actress award at the 12th Gaudí Awards. She appeared in the film as a real-life expectant woman alongside her then partner David Verdaguer. In 2022, she featured as Carol in comedy-drama television series The Girls at the Back. Her portrayal of Lola, a 40-year-old-woman whose happy life is temporarily upended by an unexpected pregnancy, in Liliana Torres' comedy-drama Mamifera (2024) earned her the Best Performance award at the Austin-based SXSW festival.

== Accolades ==
Year	Award	Category	Work	Result	Ref.
2019	22nd Málaga Film Festival	Silver Biznaga for Best Actress	The Days to Come	Won	
2020	7th Feroz Awards	Best Main Actress in a Film	The Days to Come	Nominated	
2020	12th Gaudí Awards	Best Actress	The Days to Come	Won	
2024	2024 SXSW Film Festival	Special Jury Award for Performance	Mamifera	Won	
2025	17th Gaudí Awards	Best Actress	Mamifera	Nominated	
2025	17th Gaudí Awards	Best Supporting Actress	A House on Fire	Nominated	
2025	12th Feroz Awards	Best Supporting Actress in a Film	A House on Fire	Nominated	
2025	39th Goya Awards	Best Supporting Actress	A House on Fire	Nominated	
2025	47th Moscow International Film Festival	Silver St. George for Best Actress	A House on Fire	Won	
2026	18th Gaudí Awards	Best Actress	Frontier	Nominated	
