= 34th Goya Awards =

- Date: 25 January 2020
- Site: Palacio de Deportes José María Martín Carpena, Málaga
- Hosted by: Andreu Buenafuente; Silvia Abril
- Organized by: Academy of Cinematographic Arts and Sciences of Spain

Highlights
- Best Film: Pain and Glory
- Best Actor: Antonio Banderas; Pain and Glory
- Best Actress: Belén Cuesta; The Endless Trench
- Most awards: Pain and Glory (7)
- Most nominations: While at War (17)

Television coverage
- Network: La 1
- Viewership: 3.60 million (26.0%)

The 34th Goya Awards ceremony, presented by the Academy of Cinematographic Arts and Sciences (AACCE), honored the best in Spanish films of 2019 and took place at the Palacio de Deportes José María Martín Carpena in Málaga on 25 January 2020. The ceremony was televised in Spain by Televisión Española (TVE) and was hosted for the second consecutive year by television presenter and comedian Andreu Buenafuente and actress Silvia Abril. It was also televised for the international public by the TVE Internacional channel. It was the third overall time and the second consecutive year that the ceremony was held outside of Madrid: previously the 14th edition and the 33rd edition had taken place in Barcelona and Seville respectively. It was also the second consecutive year that the ceremony takes place in Andalusia.

Nominations were announced on 2 December 2019 by Elena Anaya and Miguel Herrán. While at War received the most nominations with seventeen, followed by Pain and Glory and The Endless Trench with sixteen and fifteen nominations respectively.

Pain and Glory won seven awards including Best Film, Best Director for Pedro Almodóvar, Best Actor for Antonio Banderas, Best Supporting Actress for Julieta Serrano, and Best Original Screenplay. The broadcast on La 1 commanded 3,598,000 viewers (26.0% audience share).

== Winners and nominees ==
The winners and nominees are listed as follows:

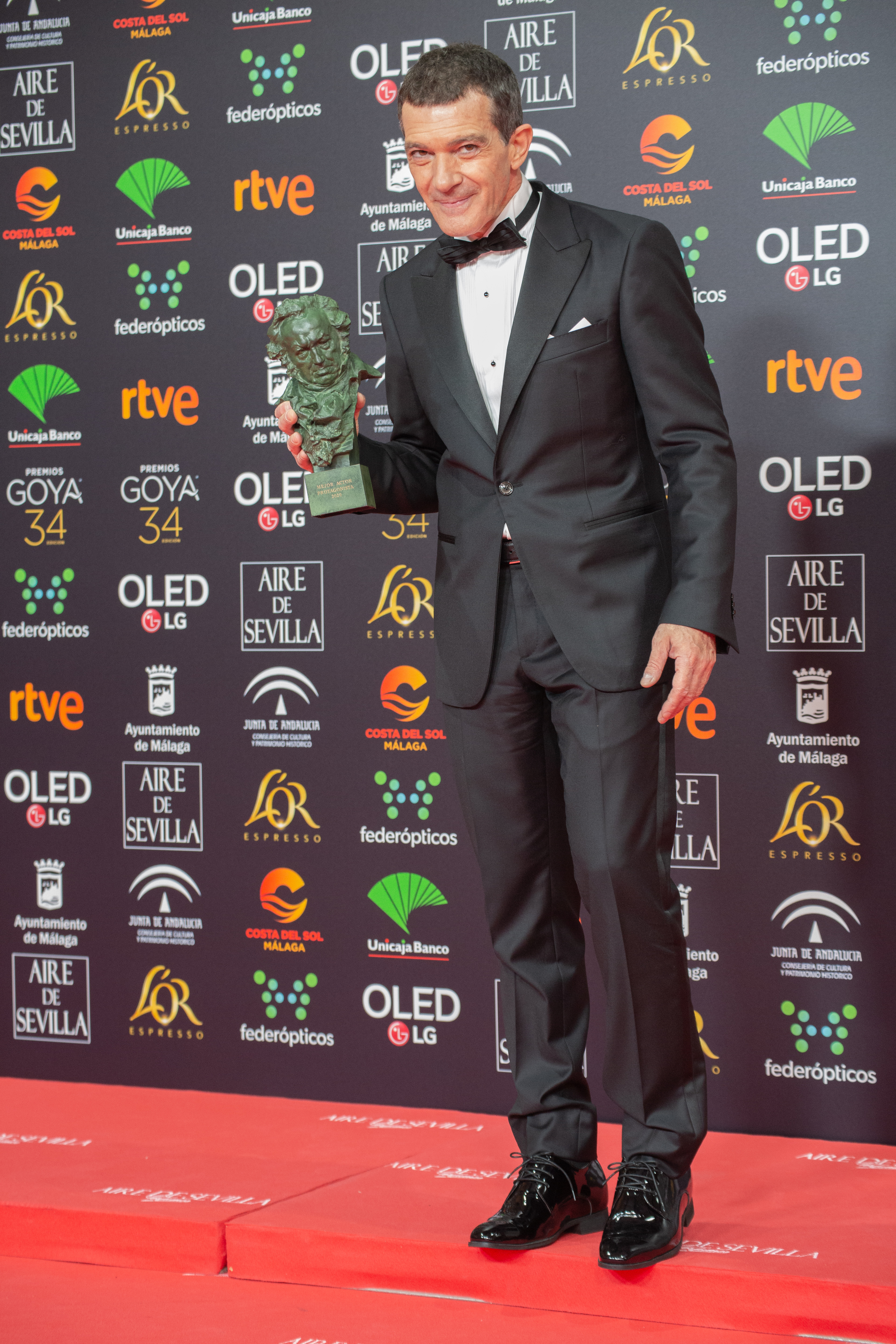
Antonio Banderas, Best Actor winner

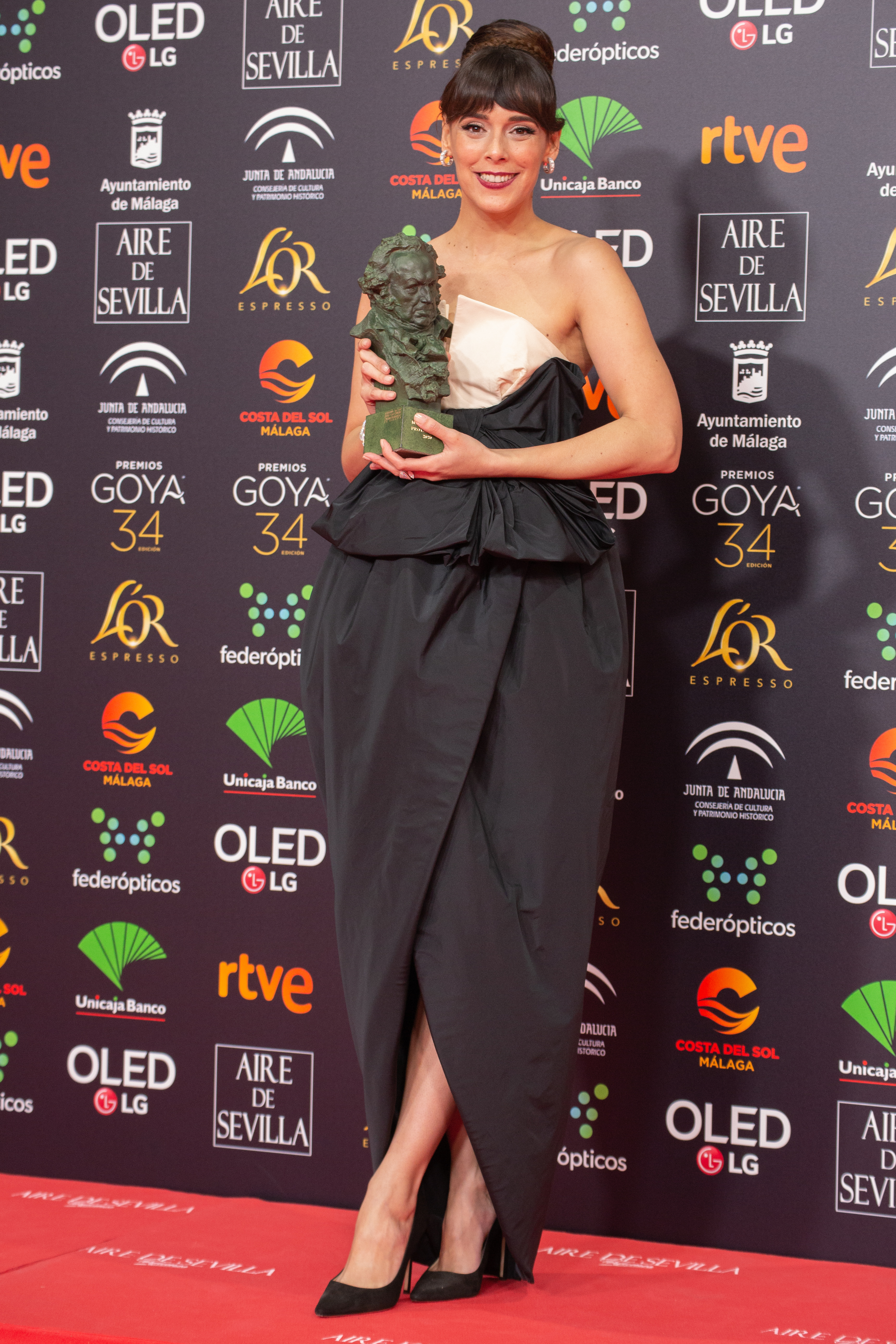
Belén Cuesta, Best Actress winner

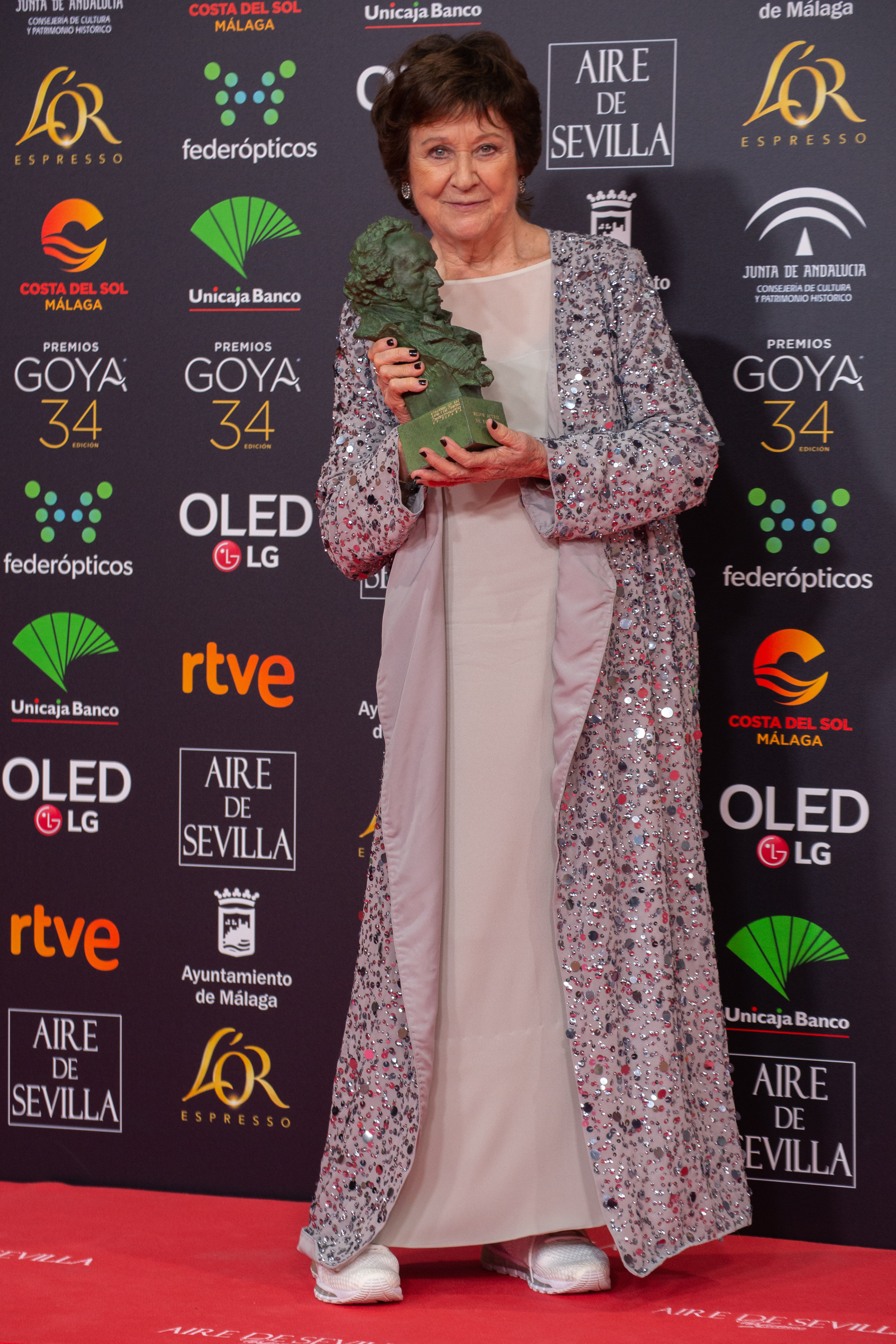
Julieta Serrano, Best Supporting Actress winner

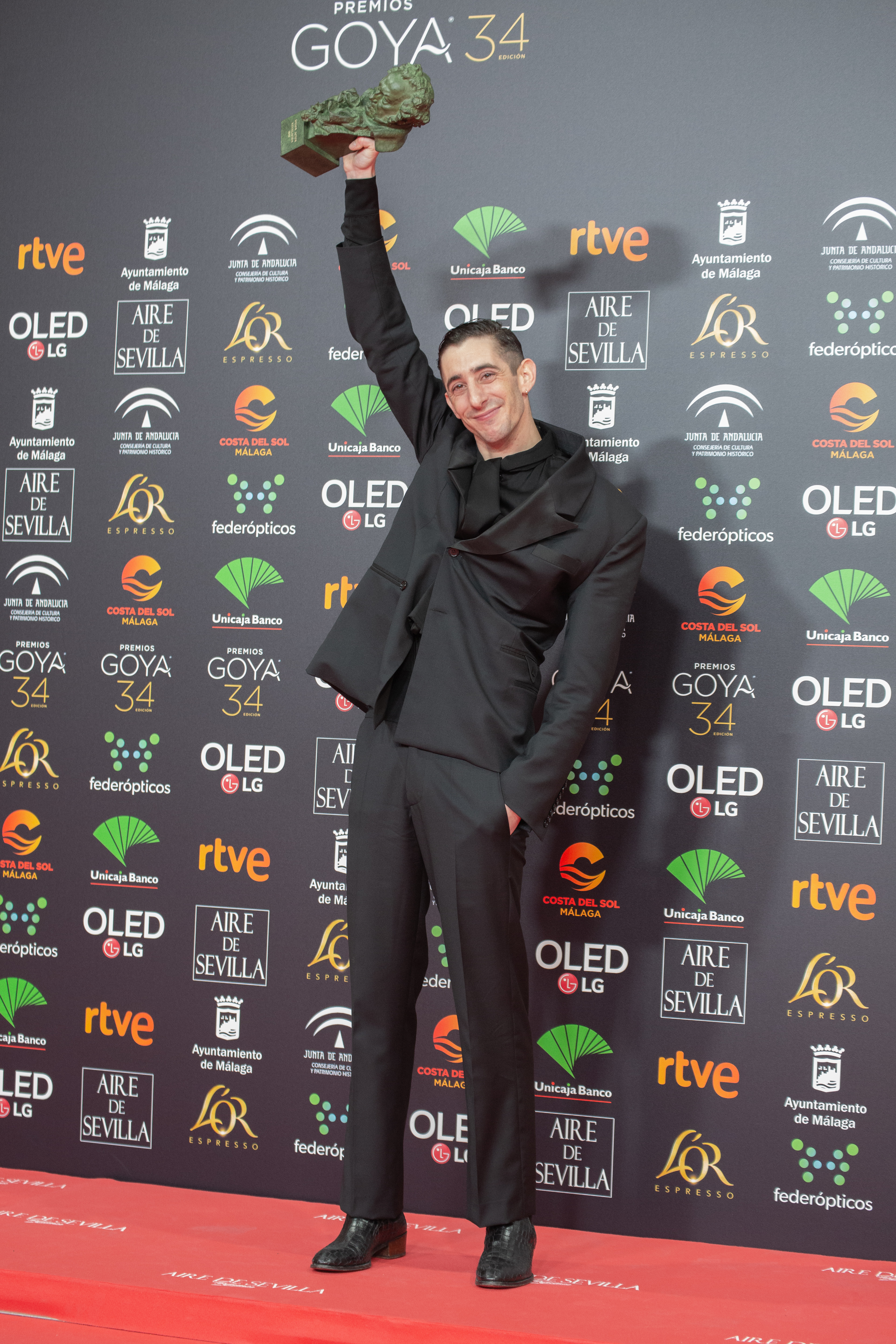
Enric Auquer, Best New Actor winner

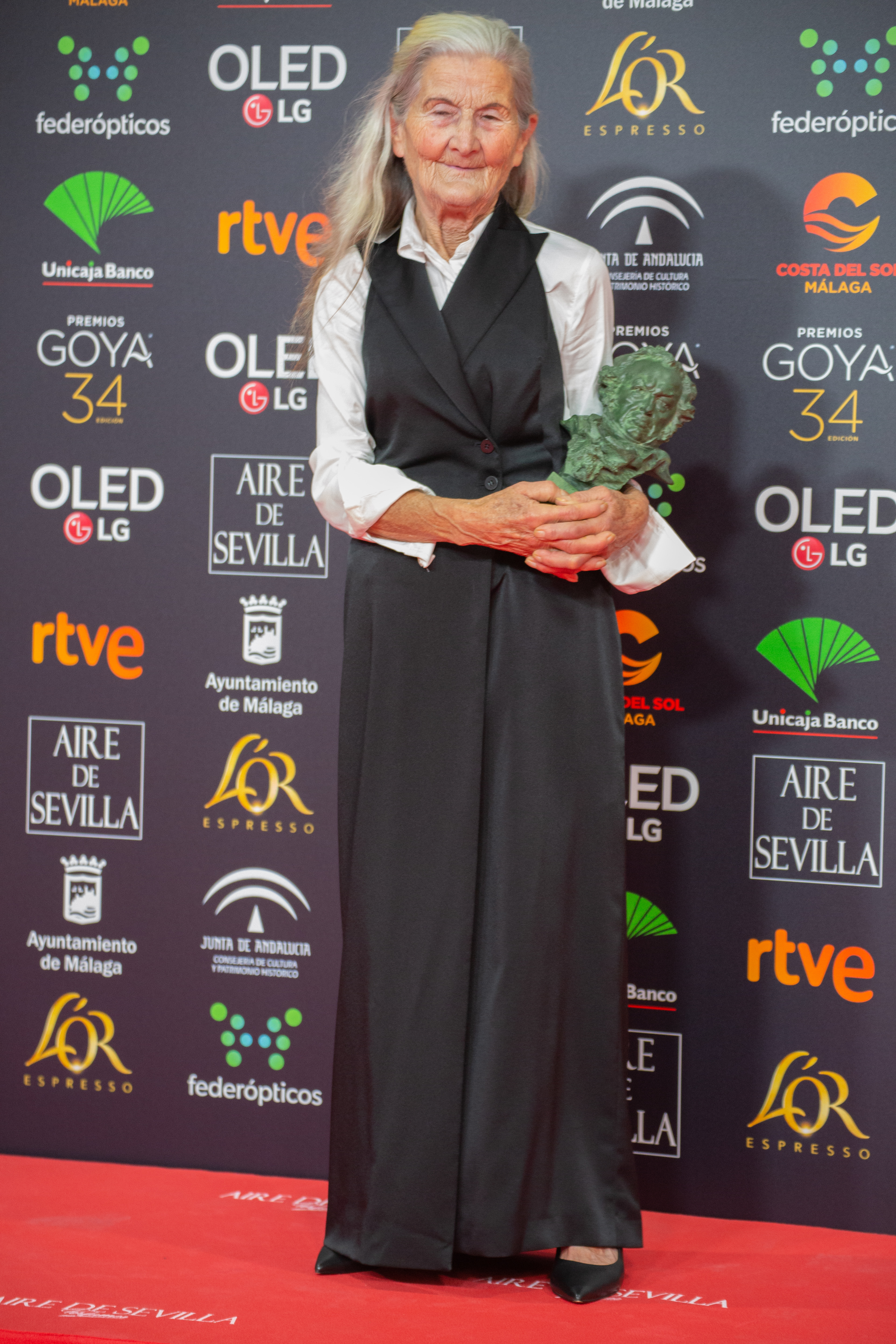
Benedicta Sánchez, Best New Actress winner

Best Film: Pain and Glory; Out in the Open; The Endless Trench; Fire Will Come; While at War	Best Director: Pedro Almodóvar – Pain and Glory; Alejandro Amenábar – While at War; Aitor Arregi, Jon Garaño, Jose Mari Goenaga – The Endless Trench; Oliver Laxe – Fire Will Come
Best Actor: Antonio Banderas – Pain and Glory; Antonio de la Torre – The Endless Trench; Karra Elejalde – While at War; Luis Tosar – Eye for an Eye	Best Actress: Belén Cuesta – The Endless Trench; Penélope Cruz – Pain and Glory; Greta Fernández – A Thief's Daughter; Marta Nieto – Mother
Best Supporting Actor: Eduard Fernández – While at War; Luis Callejo – Out in the Open; Asier Etxeandia – Pain and Glory; Leonardo Sbaraglia – Pain and Glory	Best Supporting Actress: Julieta Serrano – Pain and Glory; Natalia de Molina – Bye; Mona Martínez – Bye; Nathalie Poza – While at War
Best New Actor: Enric Auquer – Eye for an Eye; Santi Prego – While at War; Nacho Sánchez – Seventeen; Vicente Vergara – The Endless Trench	Best New Actress: Benedicta Sánchez – Fire Will Come; Carmen Arrufat – The Innocence; Pilar Gómez – Bye; Ainhoa Santamaría – While at War
Best Original Screenplay: Pedro Almodóvar – Pain and Glory; David Desola, Pedro Rivero – The Platform; Jose Mari Goenaga, Luiso Berdejo – The Endless Trench; Alejandro Amenábar, Alejandro Hernández – While at War	Best Adapted Screenplay: Benito Zambrano, Daniel Remón, Pablo Remón – Out in the Open; Eligio Montero, Salvador Simó – Buñuel in the Labyrinth of the Turtles; Isabel Peña, Rodrigo Sorogoyen – Mother; Javier Gullón – Advantages of Travelling by Train
Best Ibero-American Film: Heroic Losers · Argentina; Spider · Chile; The Awakening of the Ants · Costa Rica; Monos · Colombia	Best European Film: Les Misérables; Border; Portrait of a Lady on Fire; Yesterday
Best New Director: Belén Funes – A Thief's Daughter; Galder Gaztelu-Urrutia – The Platform; Aritz Moreno – Advantages of Travelling by Train; Salvador Simó – Buñuel in the Labyrinth of the Turtles	Best Animated Film: Buñuel in the Labyrinth of the Turtles; Elcano & Magellan: The First Voyage Around the World; Klaus
Best Cinematography: Mauro Herce – Fire Will Come; José Luis Alcaine – Pain and Glory; Javi Agirre Erauso – The Endless Trench; Alex Catalán – While at War	Best Editing: Teresa Font – Pain and Glory; Laurent Dufreche, Raúl López – The Endless Trench; Alberto del Campo – Mother; Carolina Martínez Urbina – While at War
Best Art Direction: Juan Pedro de Gaspar – While at War; Antxón Gómez – Pain and Glory; Pepe Domínguez – The Endless Trench; Mikel Serrano – Advantages of Travelling by Train	Best Production Supervision: Carla Pérez de Albéniz – While at War; Toni Novella – Pain and Glory; Manolo Limón – Out in the Open; Ander Sistiaga – The Endless Trench
Best Sound: Iñaki Díez, Alazne Ameztoy, Xanti Salvador, Nacho Royo-Villanova – The Endless Trench; Sergio Bürmann, Pelayo Gutiérrez, Marc Orts – Pain and Glory; Aitor Berenguer, Gabriel Gutiérrez – While at War; David Machado, Gabriel Gutiérrez, Yasmina Praderas – Eye for an Eye	Best Special Effects: Mario Campoy, Iñaki Madariaga – The Platform; Jon Serrano, David Heras – The Endless Trench; Raúl Romanillos, Juanma Nogales – While at War; Juan Ramón Molina, Félix Bergés – Off Course... To China
Best Costume Design: Sonia Grande – While at War; Paola Torres – Pain and Glory; Lourdes Fuentes, Saioa Lara – The Endless Trench; Alberto Valcárcel – Paradise Hills	Best Makeup and Hairstyles: Ana López-Puigcerver, Belén López-Puigcerver, Nacho Díaz – While at War; Ana Lozano, Sergio Pérez Berbel, Montse Ribé – Pain and Glory; Yolanda Piña, Félix Terrero, Nacho Díaz – The Endless Trench; Karmele Soler, Olga Cruz – Advantages of Travelling by Train
Best Original Score: Alberto Iglesias – Pain and Glory; Arturo Cardelús – Buñuel in the Labyrinth of the Turtles; Pascal Gaigne – The Endless Trench; Alejandro Amenábar – While at War	Best Original Song: "Intemperie" by Javier Ruibal – Out in the Open; "Invisible" by Caroline Pennell, Jussi Ilmari Karvinen (Jussifer) and Justin Tranter – Klaus; "Allí en la arena" by Toni M. Mir – The Innocence; "Miel y agua" by Lorena López Martínez – La noche de las dos lunas
Best Fictional Short Film: Suc de Síndria; El nadador; Foreigner; Maras; Xiao Xian	Best Animated Short Film: Madrid 2120; El árbol de las almas perdidas; Homomaquia; Muedra
Best Documentary Film: Ara Malikian, una vida entre las cuerdas; Auterretrato; El cuadro; Historias de nuestro cine	Best Documentary Short Film: Nuestra vida como niños refugiados en Europa; 2001 Destellos en la oscuridad; El infierno; El sueño europeo: Serbia

=== Films with multiple nominations and awards ===
Films with multiple nominations
Nominations	Film
17	While at War
16	Pain and Glory
15	The Endless Trench
5	Out in the Open
4	Fire Will Come
4	Advantages of Travelling by Train
4	Buñuel in the Labyrinth of the Turtles
3	The Platform
3	Mother
3	Eye for an Eye
2	A Thief's Daughter
2	The Innocence
2	Klaus

Films with multiple awards
Awards	Film
7	Pain and Glory
5	While at War
2	The Endless Trench
2	Fire Will Come
2	Out in the Open

== Honorary Goya ==
Pepa Flores "Marisol" was awarded the Honorary Goya Award. She did not attend the ceremony and the trophy was received by her daughters Celia, María, and Tamara.

== Performances ==
The following artists performed musical performances.

Artist	Featuring	Performed
Ana Mena; Rayden	Silvia Abril; Andreu Buenafuente	Opening number
Pablo Alborán		"Sobreviviré"
Jamie Cullum		"Endings Are Beginnings" during the annual "In Memoriam" tribute
Amaia; Celia Flores		"Canción de Marisol" "Estando contigo" as part of the tribute to Marisol
A Chorus Line (2019 Spain revival cast)	Antonio Banderas	"One"
