= The Innocence (film) =

- Theatrical release poster
- Catalan: La innocència
- Directed by: Lucía Alemany
- Written by: Laia Soler; Lucía Alemany
- Produced by: Lina Badenes; Juan Gordon; Belén Sánchez
- Starring: Carmen Arrufat; Laia Marull; Sergi López; Joel Bosqued
- Cinematography: Joan Bordera
- Edited by: Juliana Montañés
- Music by: Òscar Senén
- Production companies: Turanga Films; Un Capricho de Producciones; Lagarto Films
- Distributed by: Filmax
- Release dates: 23 September 2019 (SSIFF); 10 January 2020 (Spain)
- Running time: 92 minutes
- Country: Spain
- Languages: Catalan; Spanish

The Innocence (Catalan: La innocència) is a 2019 Spanish drama film directed by Lucía Alemany (in her feature film debut), starring Carmen Arrufat alongside Laia Marull, Sergi López, and Joel Bosqued.

The film was nominated for two Goya Awards.

== Plot ==
Set in a rural area of the province of Castellón, the plot deals about Lis, a girl who dreams of becoming a circus artist and escaping her small town, even though she knows that to achieve this she'll have to defy her parents. It's summer, and Lis spends her days playing in the street and flirting with a boy. When the neighbors begin to whisper about their relationship, Lis is forced to keep it a secret from her parents. It will be a relationship that changes her life forever.

== Cast ==
- Carmen Arrufat as Lis
- Laia Marull as Soledad
- Sergi López as Catalano
- Joel Bosqued as Néstor
- Estelle Orient as Sara
- Laura Fernández as Rocío
- Sonia Almarcha as Remedios Naturales

== Production ==
The film was produced by Turanga Films, Un Capricho de Producciones, and Lagarto Films, with additional backing from IVC, ICEC, À Punt, TV3, Movistar Plus+ and ECAM's La Incubadora.

Director-screenwriter Alemany had an abortion when she was 17 and was raised in Traiguera, the main shooting location for the film.

== Themes ==
=== Female perspective in cinema ===
Director Lucía Alemany has described The Innocence as a film that could "only have been made by a woman," highlighting its focus on intimate female relationships and lived experience. In an interview with eCartelera, she positioned the film within a broader wave of contemporary Spanish cinema made by women, such as Summer 1993 by Carla Simón and Journey to a Mother's Room by Celia Rico Clavellino. These works, she argued, offer narratives shaped by a specifically female gaze, particularly in their exploration of mother–daughter dynamics: "She’s the one who gave you life, you’ve been in her womb for nine months and she’s passed everything on to you, her fears and phobias… Healing that relationship is important — otherwise, your life feels a bit blocked."

=== Adolescence and embodiment ===
A central theme of the film is the transition from girlhood to womanhood, especially as experienced in a small, conservative town. Alemany portrays the physical and emotional shifts of adolescence in a candid and non-idealised manner. She noted that she wanted the lead character Lis to reflect a recognisable teenage reality, including the discomfort that arises when a young girl’s body is prematurely sexualised by society: "One of the requirements I had for Lis was that she have big boobs, because there’s something in that — in the sense that ‘two days ago I was a child, and now I have something that is sexually very attractive’."

=== Representation vs. voyeurism ===
Alemany was deliberate in how the teenage characters’ bodies were portrayed on screen. While scenes depict girls in underwear or in intimate situations, she emphasised that the intent was never to sexualise the characters, but rather to reflect everyday adolescent behaviour authentically and without judgement: "It’s really common when you’re getting ready to go out, at home with your friends, to be in that kind of underwear. But I didn’t want it to have a sexualised gaze, because what you’re seeing is a girl. But at the same time, they are sexual objects." This duality – the contrast between internal experience and external perception – underlines the film’s broader concern with how young women are seen, judged, and constrained by their environments.

== Release ==
The film premiered at the 67th San Sebastián International Film Festival in September 2019. Distributed by Filmax, the film was released theatrically in Spain on 10 January 2020.

== Reception ==
The Innocence received positive reviews from film critics. It holds a 100% approval rating on review aggregator website Rotten Tomatoes based on six reviews, with an average rating of 6.8/10.

== Awards ==
Year	Award	Category	Nominee(s)	Result	Ref.
2019	2nd Valencian Audiovisual Awards	Best Film		Nominated	
2019	2nd Valencian Audiovisual Awards	Best Director	Lucia Alemany	Won	
2019	2nd Valencian Audiovisual Awards	Best Actress	Carmen Arrufat	Won	
2019	2nd Valencian Audiovisual Awards	Best Supporting Actress	Laia Marull	Nominated	
2019	2nd Valencian Audiovisual Awards	Best Supporting Actor	Sergi López	Won	
2019	2nd Valencian Audiovisual Awards	Best Art Direction	Asier Musitu, Bea Toro	Nominated	
2019	2nd Valencian Audiovisual Awards	Best Costume Design	Giovanna Ribes	Nominated	
2019	2nd Valencian Audiovisual Awards	Best Editing and Post-Production	Juliana Montañés	Nominated	
2019	2nd Valencian Audiovisual Awards	Best Sound	Carlos Lidón, Dani Zacarías	Nominated	
2020	7th Feroz Awards	Best Supporting Actress in a Film	Laia Marull	Nominated	
2020	12th Gaudí Awards	Best Catalan-language Film		Nominated	
2020	12th Gaudí Awards	Best Direction	Lucía Alemany	Nominated	
2020	12th Gaudí Awards	Best Screenplay	Lucía Alemany, Laia Soler	Nominated	
2020	12th Gaudí Awards	Best Actress	Carmen Arrufat	Nominated	
2020	12th Gaudí Awards	Best Supporting Actress	Laia Marull	Won	
2020	12th Gaudí Awards	Best Editing	Juliana Montañés	Nominated	
2020	12th Gaudí Awards	Best Makeup and Hairstyles	Natalia Montoya	Nominated	
2020	34th Goya Awards	Best New Actress	Carmen Arrufat	Nominated	
2020	34th Goya Awards	Best Original Song	"Allí en la arena" by Toni M. Mir	Nominated	

== See also ==
- List of Spanish films of 2020
