= Greta Fernández =

Spanish actress

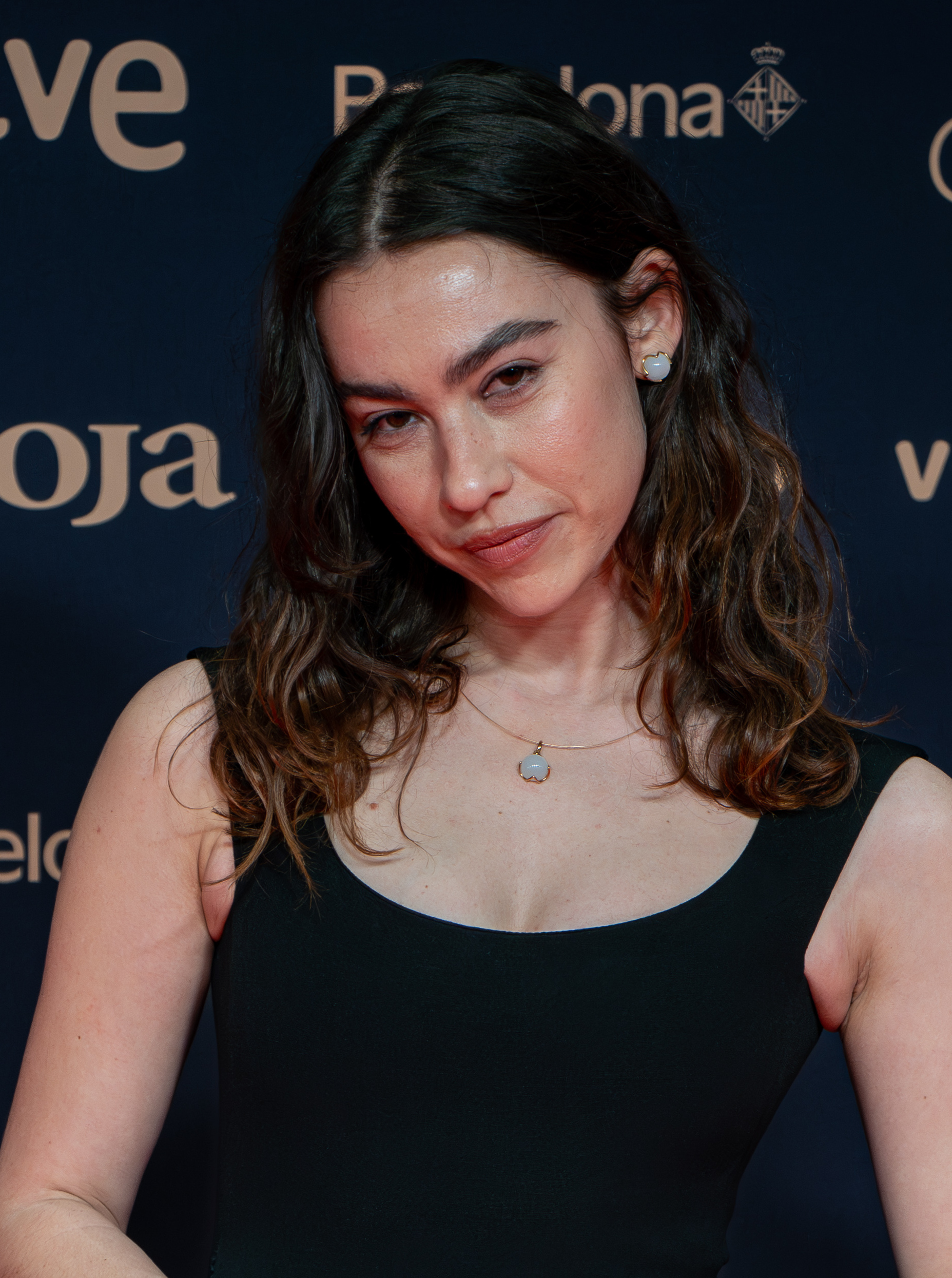
- Fernández in 2026
- Born: Greta Fernández Berbel; 4 February 1995 (age 31); Barcelona, Catalonia, Spain
- Occupation: Actress
- Years active: 2006–present
- Father: Eduard Fernández

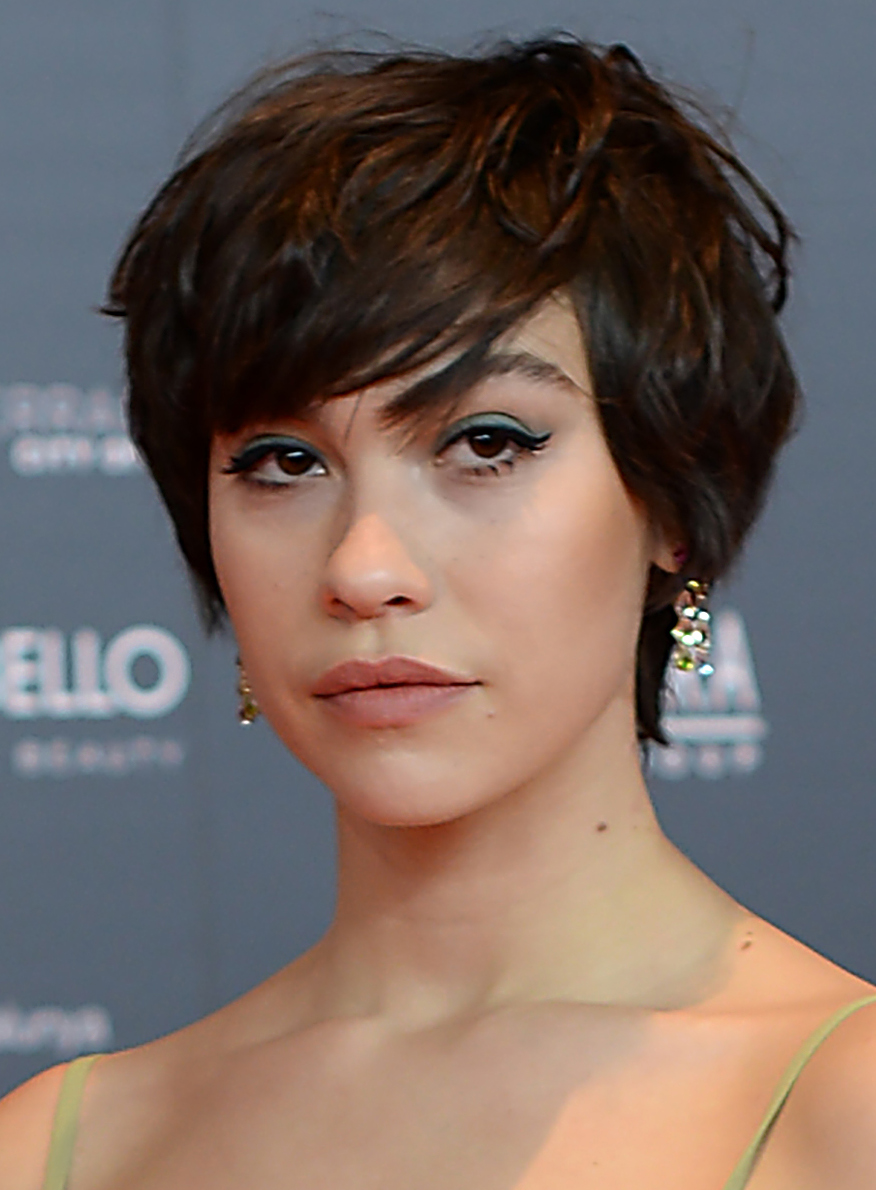
Fernández in 2020

Greta Fernández Berbel (born 4 February 1995) is a Spanish actress, best known for her roles in Elisa & Marcela and A Thief's Daughter.

== Early life ==
Greta Fernández Berbel was born in Barcelona on 4 February 1995. She is the daughter of actor Eduard Fernández and writer Esmeralda Berbel. When she was 10 years old, she featured in Cesc Gay's film Ficció (also starring her father), making her feature film debut.

== Filmography ==
=== Film ===
Key
†	Denotes films that have not yet been released

Year	Title	Original title	Role	Notes	Ref.
2006	Fiction	Ficció	Andrea		
2009	Three Days With the Family	Tres dies amb la família	Bet		
2015	Truman	Truman	Girl		
2015	Embers	Embers	Miranda		
2016	The Next Skin	La propera pell	Clara		
2017	Amar	Amar	Lola		
2017	Can't Say Goodbye	No sé decir adiós	Gloria		
2018	Sunday's Illness	La enfermedad del domingo	Greta		
2019	Elisa & Marcela	Elisa y Marcela	Marcela Gracia Ibeas		
2019	Asamblea	Asamblea	Tosca		
2019	A Thief's Daughter	La hija de un ladrón	Sara	Nominated - Goya Award for Best Actress	
2019	The Shortest Path	El camino más corto	Greta		
2020	Weights	Pessoas	Greta		
2022	The Burning Cold	El fred que crema	Sara		
2023	Unicorns	Unicornis	Isa		
2023	Teresa	Teresa	Teresa		
2024	Cuckoo	Cuckoo	Trixie		
2024	Surfacing	La llegada del hijo			
TBA	Los bárbaros †				

=== Television ===
Year	Title	Original title	Role	Notes	Ref.
2011–2015	La Riera	La Riera	Bet	Recurring role (14 episodes)	
2012	Olor de colònia	Olor de colònia	Cèlia	Mini-series	
2017	I Know Who You Are	Sé quién eres	Vero	Recurring role (4 episodes)	
2018	Killing the Father	Matar al padre	Valeria	Mini-series	
2019	Remember When	Cuéntame	Laia	Recurring role (4 episodes)	
2019	Foodie Love	Foodie Love	Greta	Guest role (2 episodes)	
2021–2023	30 Coins	30 monedas	Cristina Miralles	Recurring role (4 episodes)	
2022	Santo	Santo	Susana "Susi" Jackson	Main role	
2024	El gran salto	El gran salto	Ainhara	Main role	
2025	The Walking Dead: Daryl Dixon	–	Elena	Recurring role (4 episodes)	

== Accolades ==
Year	Award	Category	Work	Result	Ref.
2017	9th Gaudí Awards	Best Supporting Actress	The Next Skin	Nominated	
2019	67th San Sebastián International Film Festival	Silver Shell for Best Actress	A Thief's Daughter	Won	
2020	7th Feroz Awards	Best Actress	A Thief's Daughter	Nominated	
2020	12th Gaudí Awards	Best Actress	A Thief's Daughter	Nominated	
2020	34th Goya Awards	Best Actress	A Thief's Daughter	Nominated	
2020	29th Actors and Actresses Union Awards	Best New Actress	Elisa & Marcela	Nominated	
2023	6th Berlanga Awards	Best Actress	Unicorns	Nominated	
2024	32nd Actors and Actresses Union Awards	Best Film Actress in a Minor Role	Teresa	Nominated	
