= The Days to Come =

2019 film

- Catalan: Els dies que vindran
- Directed by: Carlos Marques-Marcet
- Written by: Coral Cruz; Clara Roquet; Carlos Marqués-Marcet
- Produced by: Sergi Moreno; Tono Folguera; María Zamora; Stefan Schmitz
- Starring: Maria Rodríguez Soto; David Verdaguer
- Cinematography: Alex García
- Edited by: Óscar de Gispert; Ana Pfaff; Carlos Marques-Marcet
- Production companies: Lastor Media; Avalon PC
- Distributed by: Avalon
- Release dates: 31 January 2019 (IFFR); 28 June 2019 (Spain)
- Running time: 95 minutes
- Country: Spain
- Language: Catalan

The Days to Come (Catalan: Els dies que vindran) is a 2019 Spanish drama film directed by Carlos Marques-Marcet. The film is about the emotions of a couple during pregnancy and stars real-life expectant couple Maria Rodríguez and David Verdaguer.

The film was produced by Lastor Media and Avalon PC, with the participation of Movistar+, TVE, and TVC and support from ICAA and ICEC.

Distributed by Avalon, the film was theatrically released in Spain on 28 June 2019.

== See also ==
- List of Spanish films of 2019
