= Belén Funes =

Spanish film director

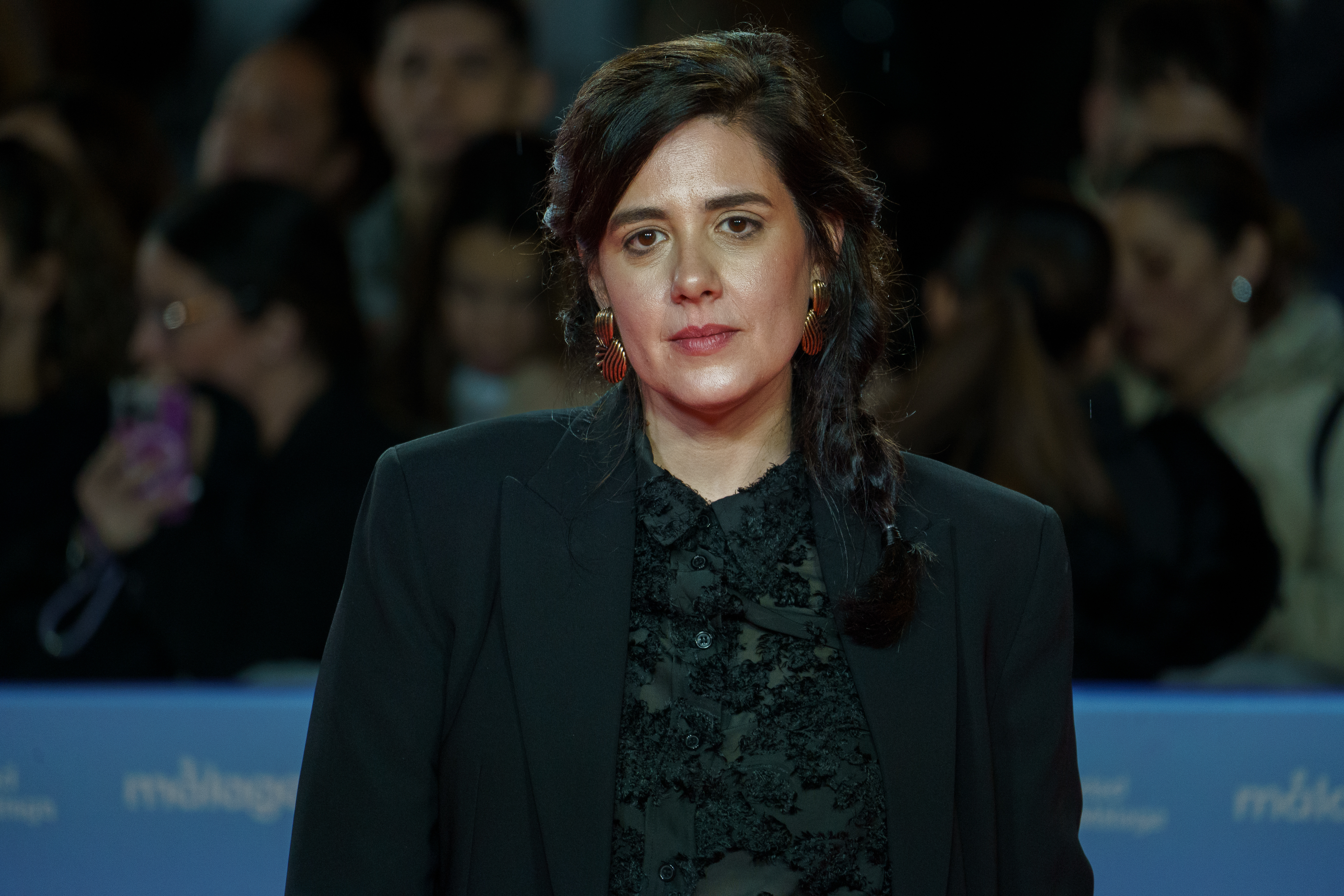
- Funes in 2025
- Born: 1984; Barcelona, Catalonia, Spain
- Education: ESCAC
- Years active: 2010s–present

Belén Funes (born 1984) is a Catalan film director. She is most noted for her 2019 feature film debut A Thief's Daughter (La hija de un ladrón), for which she won the Gaudí Award for Best Director at the 12th Gaudí Awards, and the Goya Award for Best New Director at the 34th Goya Awards.

Born in Barcelona, Funes earned a degree from the ESCAC and continued her filmmaking education in Cuba.

== Filmography ==
- A Thief's Daughter (La hija de un ladrón) - 2019
- The Exiles (Los Tortuga) - 2024
