= Enric Auquer =

Catalan actor

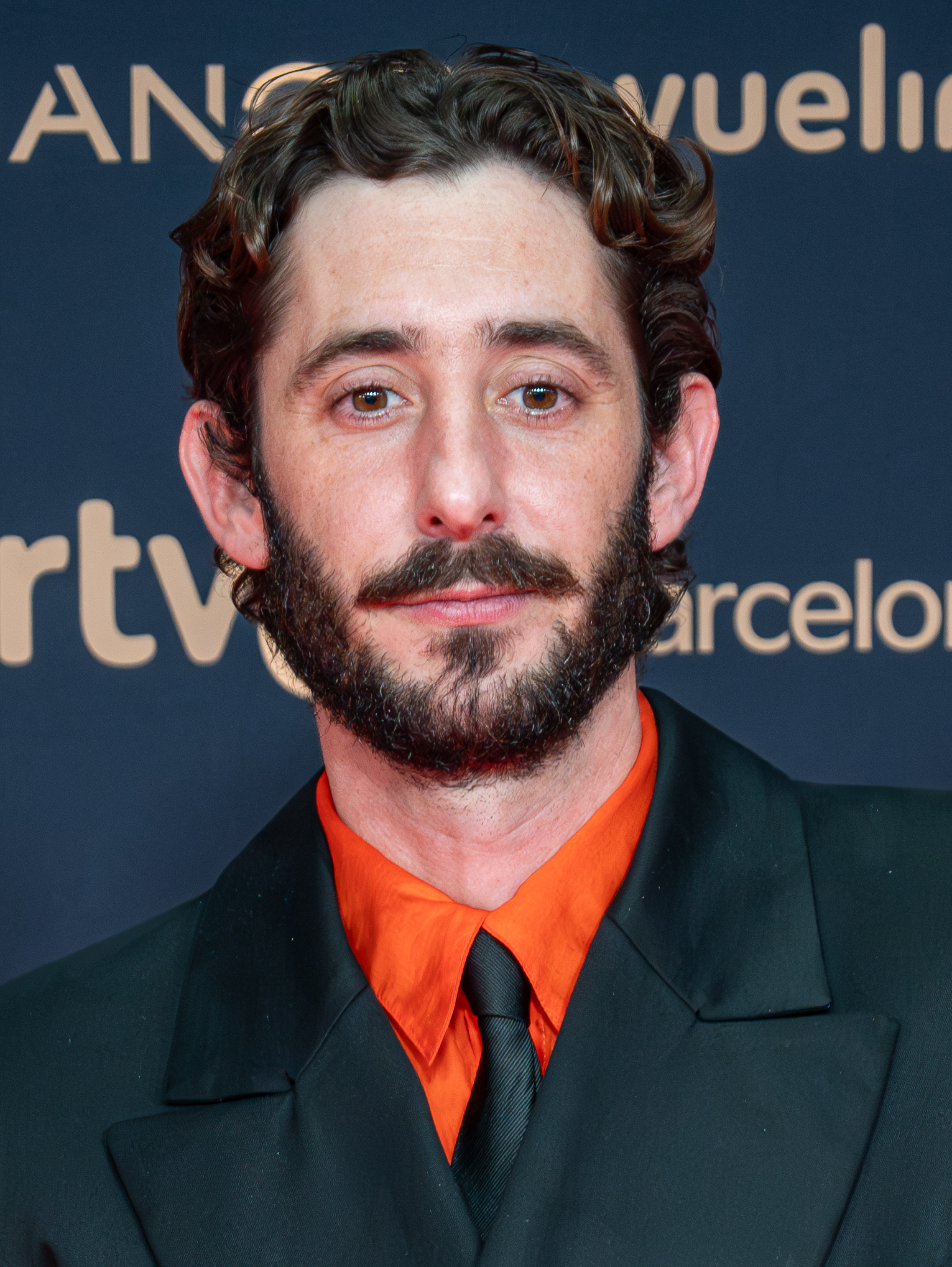
- Auquer in 2026
- Born: Enric Auquer Sardà; 28 August 1988 (age 38); Verges, Catalonia, Spain
- Occupation: Actor
- Years active: 2009–present

Enric Auquer Sardà (born 28 August 1988) is a Spanish actor.

== Career ==
Auquer's interest in acting began in 2008 after his mother encouraged him to enroll in a drama school in Barcelona. Drama classes helped him with his ADHD, as he stated: "It was the first time I felt I could be good at something. Acting healed me a lot".

He got his first acting role in 2009 when he starred in the film Mediterranean Food. After that, he began performing in theaters and, in 2017, he was cast in the television series Com si fos ahir, gaining popularity in Catalonia.

In 2019, he got his major role to date as a young Galician drug dealer in the film Eye for an Eye. For the role, he was awarded Best New Actor at the 34th Goya Awards., Best Supporting Actor in a Film at the 7th Feroz Awards and Best Actor in a Supporting Role at the 12th Gaudí Awards. In television, he got a supporting role in the series Perfect Life in which he played a young man with intellectual disability that becomes a father.

== Filmography ==
=== Film ===
Year	Title	Role	Notes	Ref.
2009	Mediterranean Food	Álex (Teenager)		
2013	Los Inocentes	Chino		
2015	Barcelona, nit d'hivern	Tècnic		
2016	Ebre, del bressol a la batalla	Fermí Quintana		
2017	Framed	Javi		
2019	La filla d'algú	Josep		
2019	Eye for an Eye	Kike		
2022	La vida padre (Two Many Chefs)	Mikel		
2023	Quest	Lluc		
2023	El maestro que prometió el mar (The Teacher Who Promised the Sea)	Antoni Benaiges		
2023	Me he hecho viral	Berto		
2024	Mamífera (Mamifera)	Bruno		
2024	Casa en flames (A House on Fire)	David		
2026	Cortafuego (Firebreak)	Santi		

=== Television ===
Year	Title	Role	Notes	Ref.
2012–2014	Kubala, Moreno y Manchón	Oriol	5 episodes	
2014	El Crack	N/A	1 episode	
2015	Cuéntame cómo pasó	Jordi	1 episode	
2016	Cites	Bernat	2 episodes	
2017–2019	Com si fos ahir	Eloi	Recurring role	
2019	Perfect Life	Gari	Main role	
2020	La línea invisible	José Antonio Etxebarrieta	Main role	
2021	Sky Rojo	Christian Expósito	Main role (season 1–2)	
2024	Mano de hierro (Iron Reign)	Ricardo		

== Stage ==
- In Memoriam
- Nit de Reis
- Natale in casa Cupiello
- Sacrificios de Iban Valero
- Titus Andrònic
- Pervertimento
- Tonio, el poeta
- Teatro sin animales
- Titus Andronicus

== Awards and nominations ==
Year	Award	Category	Work	Result	Ref.
2020	7th Feroz Awards	Best Supporting Actor in a Series	Perfect Life	Won	
2020	7th Feroz Awards	Best Supporting Actor in a Film	Eye for an Eye	Won	
2020	12th Gaudí Awards	Best Supporting Actor	Eye for an Eye	Won	
2020	75th CEC Medals	Best New Actor	Eye for an Eye	Won	
2020	34th Goya Awards	Best New Actor	Eye for an Eye	Won	
2020	67th Ondas Awards	Best Actor	Perfect Life	Won	
2022	9th Feroz Awards	Best Supporting Actor in a Series	Perfect Life	Won	
2022	9th Platino Awards	Best Supporting Actor in a Miniseries or TV Series	Perfect Life	Nominated	
2023	15th Gaudí Awards	Best Supporting Actor	One Year, One Night	Nominated	
2024	11th Feroz Awards	Best Main Actor in a Film	The Teacher Who Promised the Sea	Nominated	
2024	16th Gaudí Awards	Best Actor	The Teacher Who Promised the Sea	Nominated	
2024	38th Goya Awards	Best Actor	The Teacher Who Promised the Sea	Nominated	
2025	17th Gaudí Awards	Best Actor	Mamifera	Nominated	
2025	17th Gaudí Awards	Best Supporting Actor	A House on Fire	Won	
2025	12th Feroz Awards	Best Supporting Actor in a Film	A House on Fire	Nominated	
2025	80th CEC Medals	Best Supporting Actor	A House on Fire	Nominated	
2026	32nd Forqué Awards	Best Actor in a Series	Ravalear	Pending	
