= Eye for an Eye (2019 film) =

2019 Spanish film

- Film poster
- Spanish: Quien a hierro mata
- Directed by: Paco Plaza
- Written by: Juan Galiñanes; Jorge Guerricaechevarría
- Starring: Luis Tosar; Xan Cejudo; Ismael Martínez; Enric Auquer; María Vázquez
- Production companies: Vaca Films; Atresmedia Cine; Quien a hierro mata AIE; Playtime Production
- Distributed by: Sony Pictures Releasing International
- Release date: August 30, 2019 (Spain)
- Running time: 107 minutes
- Countries: Spain; France
- Language: Spanish

Eye for an Eye (Spanish: Quien a hierro mata; lit. 'Who kills by iron') (Note: The title refers to the idiom Spanish: Quien a hierro mata, a hierro muere; Who lives by the sword, dies by the sword)) is a 2019 drama-thriller film directed by Paco Plaza, written by Juan Galiñanes and Jorge Guerricaechevarría and starring Luis Tosar, Xan Cejudo, Ismael Martínez, Enric Auquer and María Vázquez. The movie follows an elderly drug dealer that gets released from prison due to his health problems and gets admitted in an elderly home. His nurse turns to have had his life tragically affected by the drug dealer's actions.

== Plot ==
The film opens with Kike (Enric Auquer) on a fishing platform. A man is seen with his hands chained together and thrown in a large underwater cage. In prison, semi-retired drug lord Antonio Padín (Xan Cejudo) is given a series of tests, showing that his mobility is limited, and decreasing due to an unnamed condition. Padín is released from prison due to his medical state, and picked up by one of his children, Toño (Ismael Martínez) who says he is here to take him home. Kike calls to ask Padín to do with the man they've captured and are torturing. Padín tells him to break his legs before informing Toño that he doesn't want to come home and is instead going to a nursing home "because I fucking feel like it".

Cut to Mario (Luis Tosar) and Julia (María Vázquez) at a class for pregnant couples. After the class ends she drops him at his work; he is head nurse at an assisted living facility. He is shown to be good at his job, able to talk a sullen patient into eating his dinner, though the method he uses (promising the man smokes before saying he won't remember the promise) maybe suspect. Another staff member, Ana (María Luisa Mayol) informs Mario that Padín will be coming to stay there. Mario recognizes the name, and that Padín is/was a drug lord.

Padín argues with Kike and Toño about dealings with the Chinese and Colombians. Kike is shown to have little respect for Padín, who in turn has no patience for his immaturity. Mario runs Padín through some simple hand stretches to improve his mobility, seeming to earn a begrudging trust from the older man. Toño tells Padín that they're going ahead "with or without you" as Kike threatens Mario with violence if Mario does anything to harm Padín. A clearly shaken Mario retreats to the bathroom and stares at himself in the mirror. Back at home a news report about Padín affects him strongly but he hides this from Julia, his wife.

The next morning, Padín refuses to get out of bed. Mario tells him that some people prefer nursing homes to living at home because they don't have to deal with pity from their family before asserting that Padín can still enjoy things in life. He continues to care for Padín and help him with his mobility. That night, after being helped into bed Padín thanks him sincerely. After work Mario drives to a sketchy part of town, lying to Julia about why he'll be late. He purchases drugs from an inebriated man who then calls after him "I recognize your face, but you were dead!" which he ignores. He is shown preparing the drugs (heroin) at the hospital, drawing it into a syringe that he injects between Padín's toes after telling the man it's not oral medication so it won't "tax his throat". Mario then meets Julia outside who notices he's shaken and asks him what's wrong. He lies again, and she comforts him by having him feel her pregnant stomach.

Kike discusses the Chinese deal with Toño once more, saying it "has to be now". They visit the nursing home where they see Padín with a group of other seniors, playing a game with a parachute. They ask him again about the business deal, leading Padín to realize they've lied to the others about his approval of the deal. Kike insults him and storms off. Mario continues to care for Padín as his condition progresses, shown through a montage of shaving him, helping him dress and eat, and more, even as he continues to inject him with the street drugs every night, always between the toes. At an ultrasound, Julia and Mario find out the baby is a boy. While listening to the heartbeat, Mario has a flashback to a younger version of himself injecting something into an unknown person's arm in what appears to be a drug den.

Toño is shown nervously waiting by several cell phones in an office at a packing plant. Kike calls him twice before pulling out a different phone and having a coded conversation about rice with a truck driver. The driver heads for a warehouse but before he can enter, police show up and he is arrested. It's shown to be a diversion as they search the truck and find nothing but clams. A different truck filled with drugs successfully makes a delivery to a separate warehouse. Shortly after, both deliverymen and one of the drivers are shot by the Chinese mobsters. Kike's car is shown to have a tracker on it, which leads the police directly to the packing plant where Toño was. They arrest Kike but Toño evades them.

Back at the nursing home, the staff meets to discuss the residents. Mario informs them that he feels Padín's physical condition is worsening quickly and other staff agree. After Mario feeds him dinner, Padín sees a news report about Kike being arrested. While trying to reach the remote, he falls out of bed and injures himself. Mario stares at him on the floor until another staff member walks by, at which point they both help Padín. Toño is shown talking to his lawyer who assures him the evidence is all circumstantial, and all they need to do is bail Kike out. Toño admits that he doesn't have the money. The lawyer tells him to get it from Padín, forcing Toño to admit that his father wasn't in on the deal. He then visits Padín to tell him what happened and ask for bail money. Padín responds by silently flipping him off.

Mario goes home and dances with his wife. Toño visits Kike in prison. Kike tells him that unless he pays the people he owes, they're both in danger. Toño admits that Padín refused to help leading Kike to break down and cry from fear. Toño promises to get him out and returns to the nursing home. Mario finds his tires slashed in the parking lot. Xepas (Dani Currás) arrives in a camo truck and motions for him to get in before taking him to meet Toño. He orders Mario to convince Padín to come home and threatens both him and Julia. Xepas roughs him up before letting him out of the truck and informing Toño that he recognized Mario from years before; he used to buy "horse" (heroin) from the bar. Julia returns home, angry at Mario for not picking her up. She finds him crouched over a bass drum, having flashbacks of his time in a band, assumedly also when he was doing drugs.

Back at the nursing home, Mario shows Padín a picture of his brother, Sergio, and tells Padín he died of an overdose when he was 26, over two decades ago. He goes on to explain that Sergio was dealing for Padín at the time in exchange for his own supply. Mario tells Padín that not only has he been giving him heroin, but he hasn't been giving him his usual medication, and in fact has been feeding him bleach to make him sicker. Meanwhile, Toño is holding another staff member, Andrés, from the nursing home hostage in his own home in order to threaten him into declaring his father legally insane, but the staff is accidentally killed during a struggle. In prison, Kike is assaulted by three men who tell him they want their money or they're going to kill him. At the nursing home Padín struggles to tell a nurse about the hidden drugs but Mario interrupts them. Julia visits Mario at work and learns who Padín is right before her water breaks and she goes into labor.

Julia tries to question Mario about Padín but it interrupted by the doctor. After she is given a sedative, he leaves and heads for the nursing home. When he arrives he sees the police there to talk about Andrés death, and sees an unknown man in a suit. He threatens Padín with an overdose unless he tells him who the man is. Padín refuses but Mario learns from a doctor that the man was a notary. Instead of returning to Julia, Mario hurries to replace Padín's blood samples before they can be tested. He then returns to Padín intending to make good on his threat to kill him. Before he does, he admits to killing his brother purposefully after his brother begged him to do so. He then injects Padín and leaves.

Toño is shown in his car having a heated argument over the phone. He sees Mario driving away and gives chase as Julia is shown in the middle of labor. Mario is saved when a flower truck hits Toño's car, killing the two drivers, but leaving Mario unscathed. Mario retrieves the syringe he killed Padín with and cleans his fingerprints off before pressing it to Toño's hand. Toño revives briefly but Mario smothers him. At the hospital Mario arrives in time for Julia to give birth. Padín is shown overdosing in bed. The baby is born healthy and they agree to name him Sergio.

Mario attends Padín's funeral. Kike is also there, escorted by prison guards. After, the notary approaches Mario and asks to speak with him. In his office, the notary presents Mario and Kike with Padín's will, in which he leaves everything to Mario's firstborn son. Since Mario himself is not the recipient, he can't refuse it. Kike makes a call to Xepas who heads for Julia and the baby. Immediately after, he is caught in the prison yard by the Colombians and killed.

Mario returns home to find Julia dead. The baby, still alive, nurses at her breast.

== Cast ==
- Luis Tosar as Mario
- Xan Cejudo as Antonio Padín
- Ismael Martínez as Toño
- Enric Auquer as Kiko
- María Vázquez as Julia
- Daniel Currás as Xepas
- Rebeca Montero as Mercedes
- María Luisa Mayol as Ana (as Luisa Mayol)
- Jessica Serna as Raquel
- Tamara Canosa as Sofía
- Xosé Manuel Esperante as Andrés
- Víctor Duplá as Alfredo
- Xoel Fernández as Santiago
- César Valdés as Sánchez
- Pepo Suevos as Vicente

== Production ==
The film was produced by Vaca Films, Atresmedia Cine and Quien a hierro mata AIE alongside Playtime Production and it had the participation of Atresmedia, Movistar+, TVG and Netflix and support from ICAA, AGADIC and Creative Europe's MEDIA. Shooting locations included A Coruña, Vilanova de Arousa and the Island of Arousa.

== Release ==
Distributed by Sony Pictures Entertainment Iberia, Eye for an Eye was theatrically released in Spain on August 30, 2019. It was released on Netflix on March 30, 2021.

== See also ==
- List of Spanish films of 2019
