= Feroz Award for Best Director =

Annual Spanish film award

- Awarded for: Best Directing in a Spanish Film
- Country: Spain
- Presented by: Asociación de Informadores Cinematográficos de España
- Currently held by: Pedro Almodóvar – The Room Next Door (2025)
- Website: http://www.feroz.es/

The Feroz Award for Best Director (Spanish: Premio Feroz a la mejor dirección) is one of the annual awards given at the Feroz Awards, presented by the Asociación de Informadores Cinematográficos de España.

It was first presented in 2014, with David Trueba being the first recipient of the award for his film Living Is Easy with Eyes Closed.

== Winners and nominees ==
‡ Goya Award for Best Director winner
† Goya Award for Best Director nominee
≠ Goya Award for Best New Director winner
§ Goya Award for Best New Director nominee

=== 2010s ===
Year	Recipient(s)	English title	Original title
2014	David Trueba ‡	Living Is Easy with Eyes Closed	Vivir es fácil con los ojos cerrados
2014	Fernando Franco ≠	Wounded	La herida
2014	Álex de la Iglesia	Witching and Bitching	Las brujas de Zugarramurdi
2014	Manuel Martín Cuenca †	Cannibal	Caníbal
2014	Daniel Sánchez Arévalo †	Family United	La gran familia española
2015	Alberto Rodríguez ‡	Marshland	La isla mínima
2015	Jon Garaño and Jose Mari Goenaga	Loreak	
2015	Paco León	Carmina and Amen	Carmina y amén
2015	Carlos Marqués-Marcet ≠	10,000 km	10.000 km
2015	Carlos Vermut †	Magical Girl	
2016	Paula Ortiz †	The Bride	La novia
2016	Cesc Gay ‡	Truman	
2016	Daniel Guzmán ≠	Nothing in Return	A cambio de nada
2016	Fernando León de Aranoa	A Perfect Day †	Un día perfecto
2016	Dani de la Torre §	Retribution	El desconocido
2017	Raúl Arévalo ≠	The Fury of a Patient Man	Tarde para la ira
2017	Pedro Almodóvar †	Julieta	
2017	Juan Antonio Bayona ‡	A Monster Calls	
2017	Alberto Rodríguez †	Smoke & Mirrors	El hombre de las mil caras
2017	Rodrigo Sorogoyen †	May God Save Us	Que Dios nos perdone
2018	Carla Simón ≠	Summer 1993	Estiu 1993
2018	Aitor Arregi and Jon Garaño †	Giant	Handia
2018	Isabel Coixet ‡	The Bookshop	La librería
2018	Manuel Martín Cuenca †	The Motive	El autor
2018	Paco Plaza †	Veronica	
2019	Rodrigo Sorogoyen ‡	The Realm	El reino
2019	Arantxa Echevarría §	Carmen & Lola	Carmen y Lola
2019	Javier Fesser †	Champions	Campeones
2019	Ramón Salazar	Sunday's Illness	La enfermedad del domingo
2019	Carlos Vermut	Quién te cantará	

=== 2020s ===
Year	Recipient(s)	English title	Original title
2020	Pedro Almodóvar ‡	Pain and Glory	Dolor y gloria
2020	Aitor Arregi, Jon Garaño and Jose Mari Goenaga †	The Endless Trench	La trinchera infinita
2020	Galder Gaztelu-Urrutia §	The Platform	El hoyo
2020	Oliver Laxe †	Fire Will Come	O que arde
2020	Aritz Moreno §	Advantages of Travelling by Train	Ventajas de viajar en tren
2021	Pilar Palomero ≠	Schoolgirls	Las niñas
2021	Icíar Bollaín †	Rosa's Wedding	La boda de Rosa
2021	Cesc Gay	The People Upstairs	Sentimental
2021	Luis López Carrasco	The Year of the Discovery	El año del descubrimiento
2021	David Victori	Cross the Line	No matarás
2022	Rodrigo Cortés	Love Gets a Room	El amor en su lugar
2022	Pedro Almodóvar	Parallel Mothers	Madres paralelas
2022	Icíar Bollaín	Maixabel	
2022	Fernando León de Aranoa	The Good Boss	El buen patrón
2022	Clara Roquet	Libertad	
2023	Carla Simón †	Alcarràs	
2023	Pilar Palomero †	Motherhood	La Maternal
2023	Carlota Pereda ≠	Piggy	Cerdita
2023	Alauda Ruiz de Azúa §	Lullaby	Cinco lobitos
2023	Rodrigo Sorogoyen ‡	The Beasts	As bestas
2024	J. A. Bayona ‡	Society of the Snow	La sociedad de la nieve
2024	Isabel Coixet †	Un amor	
2024	Víctor Erice †	Close Your Eyes	Cerrar los ojos
2024	Elena Martín Gimeno †	Creatura	
2024	Estibaliz Urresola Solaguren ≠	20,000 Species of Bees	20.000 especies de abejas
2025	Pedro Almodóvar †	The Room Next Door	
2025	Arantxa Echevarría †	Undercover	La infiltrada
2025	Dani de la Orden	A House on Fire	Casa en flames
2025	Paula Ortiz †	The Red Virgin	La virgen roja
2025	Pilar Palomero	Glimmers	Los destellos
2026	Jose Mari Goenaga, Aitor Arregi	Maspalomas	
2026	Oliver Laxe	Sirāt	
2026	Eva Libertad	Deaf	Sorda
2026	Alauda Ruiz de Azúa	Sundays	Los domingos
2026	Carla Simón	Romería	

== See also ==
- Goya Award for Best Director
- Goya Award for Best New Director
