= 67th San Sebastián International Film Festival =

2019 film festival

- Opening film: Blackbird
- Location: San Sebastián, Spain
- Awards: Golden Shell (Pacified)
- Directors: José Luis Rebordinos
- Festival date: 20–28 September 2019

San Sebastián International Film Festival
- 68th 66th

The 67th San Sebastián International Film Festival took place from 20 to 28 September 2019 in San Sebastián, Gipuzkoa, Spain.

The competitive awards were presented on 28 September 2019. Pacified by Paxton Winters won the Golden Shell, as well as Best Actor and Cinematography.

== Background ==
In May 2019, actress Penélope Cruz was announced as the recipient of a Donostia Award as well as the protagonist of the official poster of the 67th edition The opening gala was hosted by Cayetana Guillén Cuervo and Loreto Mauleón. The official selection's opener was Roger Michell's Black Bird. The official selection awards were presented on 28 September 2019 during the closing gala at the Kursaal hosted by Natalia de Molina and Edurne Ormazabal.

== Juries ==
Official Selection

- Neil Jordan, Irish director and screenwriter (President)
- Bárbara Lennie, Spanish actress
- Mercedes Morán, Argentine actress
- Pablo Cruz, Mexican producer
- Katriel Schory, Israeli producer
- Lisabi Fridell, Swedish cinematographer

Latin Horizons

- Meritxell Colell Aparicio, Catalan director (president)
- Sofía Gala Castiglione, Argentine actress
- Juan Antonio Vigar, director of the Málaga Film Festival

New Directors

- Yuji Sadai, Japanese producer and distributor (President)
- Mark Adams, director of the Edinburgh International Film Festival
- Mariana Enríquez, Argentine writer and journalist
- Isabel Lamberti, German filmmaker
- Laura Mora, Colombian director

Zabaltegi-Tabakalera

- Laida Lertxundi, filmmaker and artist from Bilbao (President)
- Silvia Cruz, Brazilian producer
- Jean-Pierre Rehm, director of FIDMarseille

== Sections ==
=== Official Selection ===
The official selection lineup included the following films:

Highlighted title indicates award winner.

English title	Original title	Director(s)	Production country
The Audition	Das Vorspiel	Ina Weisse	Germany; France
And the Birds Rained Down	Il pleuvait des oiseaux	Louise Archambault	Canada
Blackbird		Roger Michell	United States
The Endless Trench	La trinchera infinita	Aitor Arregi, Jon Garaño, Jose Mari Goenaga	Spain; France
A Dark, Dark Man	Чёрный, чёрный человек	Adilkhan Yerzhanov	Kazakhstan; France
Death Will Come and Shall Have Your Eyes	Vendrá la muerte y tendrá tus ojos	José Luis Torres Leiva	Chile; Argentina; Germany
Lhamo and Skalbe	ལྷ་མོ་དང་སྐལ་བྷེ།	Sonthar Gyal	China
The Other Lamb		Małgorzata Szumowska	Ireland; Belgium; Poland; United States
Pacified	Pacificado	Paxton Winters	Brazil
Patrick		Gonçalo Waddington	Portugal; Germany
Proxima		Alice Winocour	France; Germany
Rocks		Sarah Gavron	United Kingdom
Thalasso		Guillaume Nicloux	France
A Thief's Daughter	La hija de un ladrón	Belén Funes	Spain
While at War	Mientras dure la guerra	Alejandro Amenábar	Spain; Argentina
Workforce	Mano de obra	David Zonana	Mexico

Out of competition

English title	Original title	Director(s)	Production countrie(s)
Seventeen	Diecisiete	Daniel Sánchez Arévalo	Spain
Zeroville		James Franco	United States
The Song of Names		François Girard	Canada; United Kingdom; Hungary
Special Screenings
Heroic Losers	La odisea de los giles	Sebastián Borensztein	Argentina; Spain

=== Latin Horizons ===
The following films were selected for the Latin Horizons section:

Highlighted title indicates award winner.

English title	Original title	Director(s)	Production countrie(s)
The Cordillera of Dreams	La cordillera de los sueños	Patricio Guzmán	Chile
La Llorona		Jayro Bustamante	Guatemala; France
August	Agosto	Armando Capó	Cuba; Costa Rica; France
Spider	Araña	Andrés Wood	
The Moneychanger	Así hablo el cambista	Federico Veiroj	Uruguay; Argentina; Germany
Chicuarotes		Gael García Bernal	Mexico
Again Once Again	De nuevo otra vez	Romina Paula	Argentina
The Prince	El príncipe	Sebastián Muñoz	Chile; Argentina; Belgium
La bronca		Diego Vega, Daniel Vega	Peru; Colombia
The Sleepwalkers	Los sonámbulos	Paula Hernández	Argentina; Uruguay
The Sharks	Los tiburones	Lucía Garibaldi	Uruguay; Argentina; Spain
Monos		Alejandro Landes	Colombia; Argentina; Netherlands; Germany; Sweden; Uruguay
Our Mothers	Nuestras madres	César Díaz	France; Belgium; Guatemala
Tremors	Temblores	Jayro Bustamante	Guatemala; France; Luxembourg
Let It Be Law	La ola verde (Que sea ley)	Juan Diego Solanas	Argentina; Uruguay; France

=== New Directors ===
The following films were selected for the New Directors section:

Highlighted title indicates award winner.

English title	Original title	Director(s)	Production countrie(s)
Africa	אפריקה	Oren Gerner	Israel
Bonfire at Dawn	よあけの焚き火	Koichi Doi	Japan
Beyond the Horizon	Le Milieu de l'horizon	Delphine Lehericey	Switzerland; Belgium
Disco		Jorunn Myklebust Syversen	Norway
The Giant		David Raboy	United States; France
The Good Intentions	Las buenas intenciones	Ana García Blaya	Argentina
The Innocence	La innocència	Lucía Alemany	Spain
Jordi's Letters	Las letras de Jordi	Maider Fernandez Iriarte	Spain
Lynn + Lucy		Fyzal Boulifa	United Kingdom; France
Nematoma		Ignas Jonynas	Lithuania; Latvia; Ukraine
Noura's Dream	نورا تحلم	Hinde Boujeema	Tunisia; Belgiun; France
Scattered Night	흩어진 밤	Lee Jihyoung, Kim Sol	
Sister		Svetla Tsotsorkova	Bulgaria; Qatar
Some Beasts	Algunas bestias	Jorge Riquelme Serrano	Chile

=== Zabaltegi-Tabakalera ===
The following films were selected for the Zabaltegi-Tabakalera section:

Highlighted title indicates award winner.

English title	Original title	Director(s)	Production countrie(s)
Atlantics	Atlantique	Mati Diop	France; Senegal; Belgium
Blue Boy		Manuel Abramovich	Germany; Argentina
Delphine and Carole	Delphine et Carole, insoumuses	Callisto McNulty	France; Switzerland
Nisman. The Prosecutor, the President and the Spy	El fiscal, la presidenta y el espía	Justin Webster	Spain; Germany
Private Fiction	Ficción privada	Andrés Di Tella	Argentina
Giraffe		Anna Sofie Hartmann	Germany; Denmark
First Love	初恋	Takashi Miike	Japan; United Kingdom
I Was at Home, But	Ich war zuhause, aber	Angela Schanelec	Germany; Serbia
Bird Island	L'Île aux oiseaux	Maya Kosa, Sergio da Costa	Switzerland
Isadora's Children	Les Enfants d'Isadora	Damien Manivel	France; South Korea
The Golden Legend	Leyenda dorada	Ion de Sosa, Chema García Ibarra	Spain
Lursaguak		Izibene Oñederra	Spain
The Wild Goose Lake	南方車站的聚會	Diao Yinan	China; France
Nimic		Yorgos Lanthimos	Germany; United Kingdom; United States
Our Defeats	Nos défaites	Jean-Gabriel Périot	France
Play		Anthony Marciano	France
Ghost Town Anthology	Répertoire des villes disparues	Denis Côté	Canada
Shakti		Martín Rejtman	Argentina; Chile
Urpean lurra		Maddi Barber	Spain
Zombi Child		Bertrand Bonello	France

== Awards ==
=== Official selection jury awards ===
The official selection jury (chaired by Neil Jordan and also featuring Lisabi Fridell, Pablo Cruz, Bárbara Lennie, Mercedes Morán, and Katriel Schory) granted the following awards:

- Golden Shell: Pacified by Paxton Winters
- Special Jury Prize: Proxima by Alice Winocour
- Silver Shell for Best Director: Aitor Arregi, Jon Garaño, Jose Mari Goenaga (The Endless Trench)
- Silver Shell for Best Actress: Nina Hoss (The Audition) and Greta Fernández (A Thief's Daughter)
- Silver Shell for Best Actor: Bukassa Kabengele (Pacified)
- Best Screenplay: Luiso Berdejo and Jose Mari Goenaga (The Endless Trench)
- Best Cinematography: Laura Merians (Pacified)

=== Other official awards ===
- Kutxabank-New Directors Award: Some Beasts
  - Special Mention: Sister
- Horizontes Award: Again Once Again
  - Special Mention: La bronca
- Zabaltegi-Tabakalera Award: I Was at Home, But
  - Special Mention: Isadora's Children
- City of Donostia / San Sebastián Audience Award: The Specials
- City of Donostia / San Sebastián Audience Award for Best European Film: Sorry We Missed You
- Irizar Basque Film Award: The Endless Trench

=== Non-official awards ===
- FIPRESCI Grand Prix: Roma
- FIPRESCI Award: The Endless Trench
- Feroz Zinemaldia Award: The Endless Trench
- SIGNIS Award: Rocks
- Sebastiane Award: Monos
