= 2nd Feroz Awards =

2015 Spanish film and television awards

- Date: January 25, 2015
- Site: Gran Teatro Ruedo Las Ventas, Madrid
- Hosted by: Bárbara Santa-Cruz
- Organized by: Asociación de Informadores Cinematográficos de España

Highlights
- Best Picture: Marshland (Drama); Carmina and Amen (Comedy)
- Best Direction: Alberto Rodríguez; Marshland
- Best Actor: Javier Gutiérrez; Marshland
- Best Actress: Bárbara Lennie; Magical Girl
- Most awards: Marshland (5)
- Most nominations: Marshland (9)

Television coverage
- Network: Canal+

The 2nd ceremony of the Feroz Awards was held at the Gran Teatro Ruedo Las Ventas in Madrid, on January 25, 2015. It was hosted by actress Bárbara Santa-Cruz and aired on Canal+ Spain.

== Winners and nominees ==
The nominees were announced on December 16, 2014 in Barcelona. The winners and nominees are listed as follows:

Best Drama Film: Marshland; 10,000 km; Beautiful Youth; Loreak; Magical Girl	Best Comedy Film: Carmina and Amen; Spanish Affair; Justi&Cía; Mortadelo and Filemon: Mission Implausible; The Unexpected Life
Best Director: Alberto Rodríguez — Marshland; Jon Garaño, Jose Mari Goenaga — Loreak; Paco León — Carmina and Amen; Carlos Marqués-Marcet — 10,000 km; Carlos Vermut — Magical Girl	Best Screenplay: Carlos Vermut — Magical Girl; Carlos Marqués-Marcet, Clara Roquet — 10,000 km; Jaime Rosales, Enric Rufas - Beautiful Youth; Alberto Rodríguez, Rafael Cobos — Marshland; Jose Mari Goenaga, Aitor Arregi, Jon Garaño — Loreak
Best Main Actor: Javier Gutiérrez — Marshland; Raúl Arévalo — Marshland; Luis Bermejo — Magical Girl; Javier Cámara — La vida inesperada; David Verdaguer — 10,000 km	Best Main Actress: Bárbara Lennie — Magical Girl; Natalia Tena — 10,000 km; Ingrid García Jonsson — Beautiful Youth; Carmina Barrios — Carmina and Amen; Elena Anaya — They Are All Dead
Best Supporting Actor: José Sacristán — Magical Girl; Jesús Carroza — El Niño; Karra Elejalde — Spanish Affair; Eduard Fernández — El Niño; Antonio de la Torre — Marshland	Best Supporting Actress: Itziar Aizpuru — Loreak; Nerea Barros — Marshland; María León — Carmina and Amen; Carmen Machi — Spanish Affair; Yolanda Ramos — Carmina and Amen
Best Original Soundtrack: Julio de la Rosa — Marshland; Pascal Gaigne — Loreak; Rafael Arnau — Mortadelo and Filemon: Mission Implausible; Roque Baños — El Niño; Lucio Godoy, Federico Jusid — La vida inesperada	Best Trailer: Marshland; 10,000 km; Spanish Affair; Carmina and Amen; Magical Girl
Best Film Poster: Magical Girl; Hidden Away; Carmina and Amen; Marshland; Loreak

=== Honorary Award ===
- Honorary Feroz Award: Carlos Saura

=== Special Award ===
- Special Award: Costa da Morte

== See also ==
- 29th Goya Awards
