= Manuel Cortés Quero =

Spanish Republican and mayor

Mayor of Mijas
- In office 3 March 1936 – 23 November 1936

Personal details
- Born: 1906
- Died: 1991 (aged 84–85)
- Political party: Spanish Socialist Workers' Party
- Occupation: Politician

Manuel Cortés Quero (1906-1991), known as "The Mole of Mijas", was a Spanish politician and the last Republican mayor of Mijas (Málaga) between 3 March and 23 November 1936.

== Biography ==
With the outbreak of the Spanish Civil War, he fled the municipality, to which he returned incognito on the night of 17 November 1939, beginning a long confinement in his own home that would last 30 years.

When on 28 March 1969 he heard on his radio the news that the Government had decreed the statute of limitations for crimes committed until 1 April 1939, he decided to leave his confinement. The then mayor of Mijas, Miguel González Berral, accompanied him to the Civil Guard Headquarters in Málaga, where the lieutenant colonel in command said: "You are free".

He was a founder of the local PSOE and presided over it until his death in 1991.

== Tributes ==
His life was reflected in the works of Manu Leguineche and Jesús Torbado ("Los topos", 1977) and Ronald Fraser ("Escondido", "In hiding: the life of Manuel Cortés", 1972).

In the Mijas House Museum, a recreation of what his house and hideout were for 30 years can be visited.

In 2012, the animated documentary, 30 years of darkness by Manuel H. Martín, was released, telling the story of the "moles", among them Manuel Cortés.

In 2015, the PSOE of Mijas inaugurated a headquarters in his honour, 'La Casa del Pueblo de Mijas Pueblo: Manuel Cortes, the mole of Mijas', which is located in the central street Carril of the village environment. The inauguration, held on 7 March, was attended by hundreds of neighbours to remember his figure together with his granddaughter, María Peña.

His life served as inspiration for the directors of the 2019 film The Endless Trench.
