= Proxima (film) =

2019 film directed by Alice Winocour

- Film poster
- Directed by: Alice Winocour
- Written by: Alice Winocour; Jean-Stéphane Bron
- Produced by: Isabelle Madelaine; Émilie Tisné
- Starring: Eva Green; Matt Dillon; Lars Eidinger; Sandra Hüller
- Cinematography: Georges Lechaptois
- Edited by: Julien Lacheray
- Music by: Ryuichi Sakamoto
- Production companies: Dharamsala; Darius Films; Pathé Films; Pandora Film Produktion
- Distributed by: Pathé
- Release dates: September 7, 2019 (TIFF); November 27, 2019 (France)
- Running time: 107 minutes
- Country: France
- Languages: French; English; Russian; German
- Box office: $777,286

Proxima is a 2019 French drama film, directed by Alice Winocour.

The film stars Eva Green as Sarah, a woman trying to balance her work as an astronaut preparing for a year-long stint on the International Space Station with her family life as mother to an eight-year-old daughter Stella (Zélie Boulant). It also stars Lars Eidinger as Thomas, her ex-husband and Stella's father; Matt Dillon as Mike, her colleague, who is dismissive of her abilities as an astronaut; and Sandra Hüller as Wendy, a psychologist helping to guide Sarah and Stella through the complexities of the situation.

The film was shot in various real training facilities of the European Space Agency and Roscosmos such as Star City and Baikonur Cosmodrome.

== Plot ==
Sarah is a French woman who has been dreaming and training her whole life to be an astronaut. She learns that she is a late addition to the Proxima crew, an International Space Station mission which will be the final precursor before a mission to Mars.

While Sarah is thrilled to be going she struggles with leaving Stella, her daughter for whom she is the primary caregiver after separating from her spouse, Thomas. Despite her worries, she leaves Stella with Thomas and prepares for her mission.

In addition to being a late comer to the mission Sarah is also the only woman on the Mars crew. She is met with open hostility by the American captain, Mike, who lets her know that he prefers the male substitute training to be her replacement. However, Sarah gradually wins his respect as he watches her determination while training.

During training, Stella is allowed to visit Sarah once. Sarah insists that special allowances be made to accommodate her daughter and allow them more time together. While the meeting initially goes well, it ends badly as Stella becomes anxious and bored and runs away, once again causing friction between Sarah and Mike, who berates Sarah for her actions. The following day, Stella leaves while Sarah is still sleeping.

Increasingly struggling with the emotional toll of leaving, Sarah is surprised when Mike attempts to cheer her up, telling her that it is impossible to be a perfect mother or astronaut and they are only human. Later, at the last meeting before Sarah and the other astronauts go into a two-week quarantine before leaving for space, Sarah is devastated when Stella and Thomas miss their flight and her last opportunity to be with her daughter before the scheduled launch.

Sarah and Stella do see each other one more time, but it is through a pane of glass as Sarah is in quarantine. Stella reminds her mother that she promised they would be able to see the rocket she was leaving on together, and that Sarah has not kept her promise. Early in the morning, a devastated Sarah sneaks unseen out of quarantine and awakens Stella and takes her to see the rocket.

That evening, the rocket launches with Sarah on board with a picture of Stella by her side. On Earth, a teary-eyed Thomas and a smiling Stella watch the rocket launch.

== Cast ==
- Eva Green as Sarah Loreau
- Zélie Boulant-Lemesle as Stella Akerman Loreau
- Matt Dillon as Mike Shannon
- Lars Eidinger as Thomas Akerman
- Sandra Hüller as Wendy Hauer
- Aleksey Fateev as Anton Ocheivsky
- Thomas Pesquet as himself

== Release ==
Proxima premiered in the Platform Prize program at the 2019 Toronto International Film Festival and received an honorable mention from the jury. It was shortlisted to be the French submission for the 2020 Academy Award for Best International Feature Film.

== Reception ==
=== Critical response ===
Proxima has an approval rating of 86% on review aggregator website Rotten Tomatoes, based on 122 reviews, and an average rating of 7.1/10. The website's critical consensus states: "Proxima sometimes struggles to communicate its themes, but worthy intentions and a powerful central performance from Eva Green more than compensate". Metacritic assigned the film a weighted average score of 71 out of 100, based on 20 critics, indicating "generally favorable reviews".

=== Accolades ===
- César Awards, France 2020 - Best Actress - Eva Green - Nominee César
- Göteborg Film Festival 2020 - International Competition - Alice Winocour - Nominee Dragon Award
- Lumière Awards, France 2020 - Best Actress - Eva Green - Nominee Lumière Award
- Miami Film Festival 2020 - Alice Winocour - Nominee Knight Marimbas Award
- San Sebastián International Film Festival 2019 - Alice Winocour - Winner SIGNIS Award - Special Mention
- San Sebastián International Film Festival 2019 - Alice Winocour - Winner Special Mention of the Jury
- San Sebastián International Film Festival 2019 - Alice Winocour - Winner Special Prize of the Jury
- San Sebastián International Film Festival 2019 - Best Film - Alice Winocour - Nominee Golden Seashell
- Toronto International Film Festival 2019 - Alice Winocour - Winner Platform Prize - Honorable Mention
- Toronto International Film Festival 2019 - Alice Winocour - Nominee Platform Prize
