= Cristóbal Balenciaga (TV series) =

2024 Spanish biographical drama television miniseries

- Promotional poster
- Genre: Biographical drama
- Created by: Lourdes Iglesias; Aitor Arregi; Jon Garaño; Jose Mari Goenaga
- Written by: Aitor Arregi; Lourdes Iglesias; Jon Garaño; Jose Mari Goenaga
- Directed by: Aitor Arregi; Jon Garaño; Jose Mari Goenaga
- Starring: Alberto San Juan; Thomas Coumans; Adam Quintero; Josean Bengoetxea; Cecilia Solaguren; Gemma Whelan; Anouk Grinberg; Patrice Thibaud; Adrien Dewitte; Claude Perron; Camille Glémet; Émeline Bayart
- Composer: Alberto Iglesias
- Country of origin: Spain
- Original languages: Spanish; French; Basque
- No. of seasons: 1
- No. of episodes: 6

Production
- Executive producer: Xabier Berzosa
- Cinematography: Javier Agirre Erauso
- Editors: Maialen Sarasua Oliden; Raúl López
- Running time: 43–56 minutes
- Production companies: Moriarti Produkzioak; Irusoin

Original release
- Network: Disney+
- Release: 19 January 2024

Cristóbal Balenciaga is a Spanish biographical drama television miniseries created by Lourdes Iglesias, Aitor Arregi, Jon Garaño and Jose Mari Goenaga, and starring Alberto San Juan as Spanish fashion designer Cristóbal Balenciaga. The series premiered on Disney+ on 19 January 2024.

== Premise ==
In 1937, after a successful career with his ateliers in Madrid and San Sebastián dressing the Spanish elite and aristocracy, the designer Cristóbal Balenciaga made the international leap by presenting his first haute couture collection in Paris. However, the designs that set trends in Spain did not work in the sophisticated fashion empire that Paris had become, where Chanel, Dior and Givenchy were the benchmark for haute couture. Guided by his obsession for control in all aspects of his life, Balenciaga would define his style to become one of the greatest designers in history.

== Cast and characters ==
=== Main ===
- Alberto San Juan as Cristobal Balenciaga
- Thomas Coumans (Note: Coumans is credited with the main cast in all episodes except the sixth.) as Wladzio D'Attainville, Cristóbal's boyfriend
- Adam Quintero as Ramón Esparza
- Josean Bengoetxea (Note: Bengoetxea is credited with the main cast in episodes 1–4.) as Nicolás Bizkarrondo
- Cecilia Solaguren (Note: Solaguren is credited with the main cast in episodes 1–4.) as Virgilia Mendizabal
- Gemma Whelan as Prudence Glynn
- Anouk Grinberg (Note: Grinberg is credited with the main cast in all episodes except the third.) as Coco Chanel
- Patrice Thibaud (Note: Thibaud is credited with the main cast in episode 3.) as Christian Dior
- Adrien Dewitte (Note: Dewitte is credited with the main cast in episode 4 and is credited as a guest star in episodes 5 and 6.) as Hubert de Givenchy
- Claude Perron (Note: Perron is credited with the main cast in episode 6 and is credited as a guest star in episodes 2–5.) as Renée Tamisier
- Camille Glémet (Note: Glémet is credited with the main cast in episode 6 and is credited as a guest star in episodes 1–4.) as Suzanne
- Émeline Bayart (Note: Bayart is credited with the main cast in episode 6 and is credited as a guest star in all other episodes.) as Florette

=== Recurring ===
- Nine d'Urso as Colette
- Iñake Irastorza as Vera

=== Guest ===
- Elvira Cuadrupani as Bettina Ballard
- Gabrielle Lazure as Carmel Snow
- Itziar Aizpuru as Cristóbal's mother
- Ane Urtizberea as Ruth
- Francis Leplay as Lucien Lelong
- Roxane Duran as Cécile
- Christian Abart as Heim
- Jean Paul Szybura as Marcel Boussac
- Armel Cazedepats as Philippe Venet
- Anna-Victoire Olivier as Audrey Hepburn
- Marjorie Glantz as Edith Head
- Belén Cuesta as Fabiola
- Olalla Hernández as Carmen

== Episodes ==
No.	Title	Directed by	Written by	Original release date
1	"A Matter of Style" (Spanish: "Cuestión de estilo")	Aitor Arregi, Jon Garaño, and Jose Mari Goenaga	Aitor Arregi, Lourdes Iglesias, Jon Garaño, and Jose Mari Goenaga	19 January 2024
2	"The Occupation" (Spanish: "La ocupación")	Aitor Arregi, Jon Garaño, and Jose Mari Goenaga	Aitor Arregi, Lourdes Iglesias, Jon Garaño, and Jose Mari Goenaga	19 January 2024
3	"A Rival to Balenciaga" (Spanish: "Un rival para Balenciaga")	Aitor Arregi, Jon Garaño, and Jose Mari Goenaga	Aitor Arregi, Lourdes Iglesias, Jon Garaño, and Jose Mari Goenaga	19 January 2024
4	"Replicas" (Spanish: "Réplicas")	Aitor Arregi, Jon Garaño, and Jose Mari Goenaga	Aitor Arregi, Lourdes Iglesias, Jon Garaño, and Jose Mari Goenaga	19 January 2024
5	"Dressing a Queen" (Spanish: "Vestir a una reina")	Aitor Arregi, Jon Garaño, and Jose Mari Goenaga	Aitor Arregi, Lourdes Iglesias, Jon Garaño, and Jose Mari Goenaga	19 January 2024
6	"I Am Balenciaga" (Spanish: "Balenciaga soy yo")	Aitor Arregi, Jon Garaño, and Jose Mari Goenaga	Aitor Arregi, Lourdes Iglesias, Jon Garaño, and Jose Mari Goenaga	19 January 2024

== Production ==
On 12 November 2021, Disney+ announced that they would produce their first original series in Spain: Balenciaga, a biographical series about Spanish couturier Cristóbal Balenciaga. In June 2022, Alberto San Juan was cast as Balenciaga, while the rest of the cast was revealed in July 2022. In late September 2022, it was announced that the series was on track to complete filming after four months of work in various locations.

When Disney+ announced the premiere date for the series, it was revealed that at some point in production the title of the series had changed from Balenciaga to Cristóbal Balenciaga.

== Release ==
On 30 October 2023, Disney+ released the teaser trailer and announced that the series would premiere on Disney+ in Spain and on Star+ in Latin America on 19 January 2024. On 18 December 2023, the final trailer for the series was released.

== Accolades ==
Year	Award	Category	Nominee(s)	Result	Ref.
2024	30th Forqué Awards	Best Series		Nominated	
2024	30th Forqué Awards	Best Actor in a Series	Alberto San Juan	Nominated	
2025	12th Feroz Awards	Best Drama Series		Nominated	
2025	12th Feroz Awards	Best Main Actor in a Series	Alberto San Juan	Nominated	
2025	33rd Actors and Actresses Union Awards	Best Television Actor in a Leading Role	Alberto San Juan	Nominated	
2025	33rd Actors and Actresses Union Awards	Bet Television Actress in a Minor Role	Belén Cuesta	Nominated	
