= The Endless Trench =

2019 Spanish historical drama film

- Spanish: La trinchera infinita
- Directed by: Jon Garaño; Aitor Arregi; Jose Mari Goenaga
- Written by: Luiso Berdejo; Jose Mari Goenaga
- Produced by: Xabier Berzosa; Iñaki Gomez; Iñigo Obeso
- Starring: Antonio de la Torre; Belén Cuesta
- Cinematography: Javi Agirre Erauso
- Edited by: Laurent Dufreche; Raúl López
- Music by: Pascal Gaigne
- Production companies: Irusoin; Moriarti Produkzioak; La Claqueta PC; Manny Films
- Release dates: 22 September 2019 (San Sebastián); 31 October 2019 (Spain)
- Countries: Spain; France
- Language: Spanish

The Endless Trench (Spanish: La trinchera infinita) is a 2019 Spanish-French historical drama film directed by Jon Garaño, Aitor Arregi and Jose Mari Goenaga. It premiered at the 2019 San Sebastián International Film Festival, where it won the Silver Shell for Best Director and the Jury Prize for Best Screenplay. It was selected as the Spanish entry for the Best International Feature Film at the 93rd Academy Awards, but it was not nominated.

At the outbreak of the Spanish Civil War in 1936, young newlyweds Higinio and Rosa are worried about the risk of reprisal killings, as Higinio is a Republican. He hides in a hole underneath their house with his wife's help. Despite the constant threat of discovery, as the Falangists search for him, the couple's love helps them to remain resilient. Higinio becomes increasingly isolated in his hiding spot, where he stays until the 1969 amnesty. The story is told in chapter-like sections, each with titles alluding to the themes.

== Plot ==
In 1936, at the start of the Spanish Civil War, a newly-married man who has criticized the Nationalist army and government fears that he will be the victim of reprisal killings and goes into hiding. As Falangists search for him, he hides under the floor of his house with the help of his wife. The first section, titled “campeada” ("to run”) depicts his first period where he is on the run from his pursuers.

The next section is titled “Esconder” (“hiding”) shows his betrayal by his neighbor, and then his move to a trench dug under the kitchen. The next section is titled “Detención” (“temporary loss of freedom”). During this section, the couple start to imagine that the Republicans will win the civil war, but this is only a fantasy.

The next section is titled Peligro (danger). As the political situation worsens, Higinio's wife is arrested, but she does not betray her husband's hiding place. The next section is titled Encerrar (shut down). It is about his isolation in his hiding spot. His wife gets pregnant with a child who might be theirs, or perhaps the child of a policeman who raped Rosa and then was killed by Higinio and Rosa. At times Rosa is gone from the house for a time when she goes elsewhere to give birth to the child. When two gay men start staying in the house, Higinio befriends them.

The next section is called Apartado (separate). Higinio starts to feel very isolated and detached from outside world, which he can only see in glimpses through the curtains or from muffled sounds. He tries to follow the news on the radio and TV to learn more. In the Cambiar (changing) and Franco sections, Higino goes through a major change. With the birth of their son Jaime (who Rosa identifies to the neighbors as her nephew), Higinio starts to reconsider whether he should remain in hiding. His wife tells him the family has been needing his help.

In the next section, his wife and son start to question why he remains in hiding, arguing that no one is still looking for him. In the neighborhood, it is becoming well known that he is living under the house. However, he has become habituated to his isolation, and it is hard for him to leave his hole.

The next chapter is titled Desenterrar. Higinio realizes that it is probably safe to come out of hiding. When, in 1969, the Franco government announces an amnesty, and pardons him for his political offenses, he still cannot leave the trench. After 33 years, his isolation has become his normal life.

The final chapter, Salir (getting out), begins when Rosa threatens to leave him, realising that Higinio is too trapped in fear. He finally manages to leave the hole, as many other "topos" ("moles") show themselves again.

== Cast ==
- Antonio de la Torre as Higinio Blanco, a Republican
- Belén Cuesta as Rosa, a seamstress, and Higinio's wife
- Vicente Vergara as Gonzalo Palacio
- José Manuel Poga as Rodrigo
- José María del Castillo
- Carlos Bernardino as Falangista
- Emilio Palacios as Jaime
- Enrique Asenjo
- Daniel Morilla
- Antonio Romero as Fede
- Óscar Corrales as Damián
- Manuel Domínguez as Republicano 1
- Esperanza Guardado
- Javi Mena

== Release ==
The film had its world premiere on September 22, 2019 at the 2019 San Sebastián International Film Festival.

The film was released in cinemas in Spain on October 31, 2019.

== Reception ==
=== Critical response ===
The Endless Trench has an approval rating of 92% on review aggregator website Rotten Tomatoes, based on 25 reviews, and an average rating of 7.8/10. The website's critical consensus states: "A relentless thrill ride, The Endless Trench is an effective story of alienation and paranoia expertly directed by Jon Garaño and Altor Arregi". Metacritic assigned the film a weighted average score of 73 out of 100, based on 4 critics, indicating "generally favorable reviews".

=== Awards and nominations ===
Year	Award	Category	Nominee(s)	Result	Ref.
2019	67th San Sebastián International Film Festival	Silver Shell for Best Director	Aitor Arregi, Jon Garaño, Jose Mari Goneaga	Won	
2019	67th San Sebastián International Film Festival	Best Screenplay	Luiso Berdejo, Jose Mari Goenaga	Won	
2019	67th San Sebastián International Film Festival	FIPRESCI Award		Won	
2019	67th San Sebastián International Film Festival	Irizar Basque Film Award		Won	
2019	67th San Sebastián International Film Festival	Feroz Zinemaldia Award		Won	
2020	25th Forqué Awards	Best Film		Won	
2020	25th Forqué Awards	Best Actress	Belén Cuesta	Nominated	
2020	25th Forqué Awards	Best Actor	Antonio de la Torre	Nominated	
2020	7th Feroz Awards	Best Drama Film		Nominated	
2020	7th Feroz Awards	Best Director	Aitor Arregi, Jon Garaño, Jose Mari Goenaga	Nominated	
2020	7th Feroz Awards	Best Screenplay	Luiso Berdejo, Jose Mari Goenaga	Nominated	
2020	7th Feroz Awards	Best Main Actress in a Film	Belén Cuesta	Won	
2020	7th Feroz Awards	Best Main Actor in a Film	Antonio de la Torre	Nominated	
2020	7th Feroz Awards	Best Original Soundtrack	Pascal Gaigne	Nominated	
2020	75th CEC Medals	Best Film		Nominated	
2020	75th CEC Medals	Best Director	Jon Garaño, Aitor Arregi, Jose Mari Goenaga	Nominated	
2020	75th CEC Medals	Best Original Screenplay	Luiso Berdejo, Jose Mari Goenaga	Nominated	
2020	75th CEC Medals	Best Actor	Antonio de la Torre	Nominated	
2020	75th CEC Medals	Best Actress	Belén Cuesta	Nominated	
2020	75th CEC Medals	Best Editing	Laurent Dufreche, Raúl López	Nominated	
2020	75th CEC Medals	Best Music	Pascal Gaigne	Nominated	
2020	34th Goya Awards	Best Film		Nominated	
2020	34th Goya Awards	Best Director	Aitor Arregi, Jon Garaño, José Mari Goenaga	Nominated	
2020	34th Goya Awards	Best Actor	Antonio de la Torre	Nominated	
2020	34th Goya Awards	Best Actress	Belén Cuesta	Won	
2020	34th Goya Awards	Best New Actor	Vicente Vergara	Nominated	
2020	34th Goya Awards	Best Original Screenplay	José Mari Goenaga, Luiso Berdejo	Nominated	
2020	34th Goya Awards	Best Cinematography	Javi Agirre Erauso	Nominated	
2020	34th Goya Awards	Best Editing	Laurent Dufreche, Raúl López	Nominated	
2020	34th Goya Awards	Best Art Direction	Pepe Domínguez	Nominated	
2020	34th Goya Awards	Best Production Supervision	Ander Sistiaga	Nominated	
2020	34th Goya Awards	Best Sound	Iñaki Díez, Alazne Ameztoy, Xanti Salvador, Nacho Royo-Villanova	Won	
2020	34th Goya Awards	Best Special Effects	Jon Serrano, David Heras	Nominated	
2020	34th Goya Awards	Best Costume Design	Lourdes Fuentes, Saioa Lara	Nominated	
2020	34th Goya Awards	Best Makeup and Hairstyles	Yolanda Piña, Félix Terrero, Nacho Díaz	Nominated	
2020	34th Goya Awards	Best Original Score	Pascal Gaigne	Nominated	
2020	29th Actors and Actresses Union Awards	Best Film Actor in a Leading Role	Antonio de la Torre	Nominated	
2020	29th Actors and Actresses Union Awards	Best Film Actress in a Leading Role	Belén Cuesta	Won	
2020	29th Actors and Actresses Union Awards	Best Film Actor in a Minor Role	Emilio Palacios	Nominated	

== See also ==
- Manuel Cortés Quero, Spanish politician and mayor on whom the film was based.
- List of Spanish films of 2019
- The Blind Sunflowers, another Spanish film about a topo.
- List of submissions to the 93rd Academy Awards for Best International Feature Film
- List of Spanish submissions for the Academy Award for Best International Feature Film
