= Brace Your Heart =

2026 Swedish drama film

- International promotional poster
- Northern Saami: Garrat du váimmu
- Directed by: Amanda Kernell
- Screenplay by: Amanda Kernell
- Produced by: Eva Åkergren
- Starring: Elli-Sara Valkeapää; Andte Gaup-Juuso; Vincent Niia
- Cinematography: Sophia Olsson
- Edited by: Linda Man
- Music by: Rebekka Karijord
- Production companies: Nordisk Film Production Sverige AB; Forest People (Norway); Compass Films (Iceland); Invictus (Bulgaria); Nordisk Film Production A/S
- Distributed by: Nordisk Film Distribution
- Release date: 15 September 2026 (TIFF)
- Running time: 97 minutes
- Countries: Sweden; Norway; Denmark; Iceland; Bulgaria
- Languages: Northern Sámi; Swedish
- Budget: €5 million

Brace Your Heart (Northern Sami: Garrat du váimmu) is a 2026 drama film written and directed by Amanda Kernell. An international co‑production, it's set in a remote Sámi village in the mountains of Sweden, and follows 20-year-old Ejva as she inherits her father's reindeer herd and fights to preserve the ancestral tradition entrusted to her.

The film had its world premiere in the Platform section of the 2026 Toronto International Film Festival on 15 September 2026, where it competed for the Platform Prize.

== Synopsis ==
Ejva, a 20-year-old living in a Sámi mountain village, inherits her father's reindeer herd. She tries hard to keep the animals healthy, and the local leader, Heaika, starts to fall in love with her. She isn’t sure she feels the same, but she feels pressured to agree. When Heaika’s cousin Nejla arrives, Ejva experiences real love for the first time. Heaika’s jealous response leaves her with shaking hands that threaten her work. Ejva must fight to regain her independence and shape her own future.

== Cast ==
- Elli-Sara Valkeapää as Ejva
- Andte Gaup-Juuso as Heaika
- Vincent Niia as Nejla

== Production ==
Amanda Kernell in an interview to Variety revealed that she started the casting process to find the newcomers suitable for roles, four years ago. The film is Amanda Kernell's third film, after her 2017 debut film Sami Blood and her 2020 Swedish Oscar entry Charter. It began filming in February 2025 in Kiruna region, Northern Sweden. Principal photography ended in June 2025.

== Release ==
Brace Your Heart had its world premiere in Platform Competition at the 2026 Toronto International Film Festival on 15 September 2026. The film was also selected for the main competition of the 74th San Sebastián International Film Festival, where it premiered on 19 September 2026, and won the Silver Shell for Best Director.

On 1 October it was screened at the Reykjavik International Film Festival for Icelandic Premiere.

It will be in European Competition at the Arras Film Festival in the first fortnight of November 2026.

On 11 February 2026, Scandinavia’s sales agent TrustNordisk acquired worldwide rights to the film, ahead of the European Film Market in Berlin.

== Accolades ==
The film was shortlisted for a nomination at the 39th European Film Awards in the Feature Film category.

Award	Date of ceremony	Category	Recipient(s)	Result	Ref.
Toronto International Film Festival	20 September 2026	Platform Prize	Brace Your Heart	Honourable Mention	
San Sebastián International Film Festival	26 September 2026	Silver Shell for Best Director	Brace Your Heart	Won	

== See also ==
- Sámi films
