= Marco, the Invented Truth =

- Theatrical release poster
- Spanish: Marco, la verdad inventada
- Directed by: Jon Garaño; Aitor Arregi
- Written by: Aitor Arregi; Jon Garaño; Jorge Gil Munarriz; Jose Mari Goenaga
- Produced by: Xabier Berzosa; Ander Sagardoy; Ander Barinaga-Rementeria; Jaime Ortiz de Artiñano; Fernando Larrondo
- Starring: Eduard Fernández; Nathalie Poza
- Cinematography: Javi Agirre Erauso
- Edited by: Maialen Sarasua Oliden
- Music by: Aránzazu Calleja
- Production companies: Irusoin; Moriarti; Atresmedia Cine; La verdad inventada AIE
- Distributed by: BTeam Pictures
- Release dates: 30 August 2024 (Venice); 8 November 2024 (Spain)
- Country: Spain
- Languages: Spanish; Catalan

Marco, the Invented Truth (Spanish: Marco, la verdad inventada), or simply Marco, is a 2024 Spanish biographical thriller drama film directed by Aitor Arregi and Jon Garaño starring Eduard Fernández as Enric Marco alongside Nathalie Poza.

== Plot ==
Primarily set in Barcelona, the plot follows the life of CNT secretary general and imposter Enric Marco, who built himself a fake past as a Nazi concentration camp survivor, gaining public recognition and sympathy.

== Cast ==
- Eduard Fernández as Enric Marco
- Nathalie Poza as Laura
- Chani Martín as Benito Bermejo
- Sonia Almarcha as Clara
- Daniela Brown
- Fermí Reixach as Pere
- Júlia Molins
- Vicente Vergara as Gracia
- Jordi Rico as Santi
- Iñigo de la Iglesia as Gil

== Production ==
The screenplay was written by Aitor Arregi, Jon Garaño, Jorge Gil, and Jose Mari Goenaga. The film is an Irusoin, Moriarti, La verdad inventada AIE, Atresmedia Cine and Bteam Prods production, with participation and backing from ICAA, the Basque Government, Atresmedia, Movistar Plus+, and EiTB. It was lensed by Javier Agirre. Shooting locations included the Basque Country (Zarautz), Catalonia, Madrid, and Germany.

== Release ==
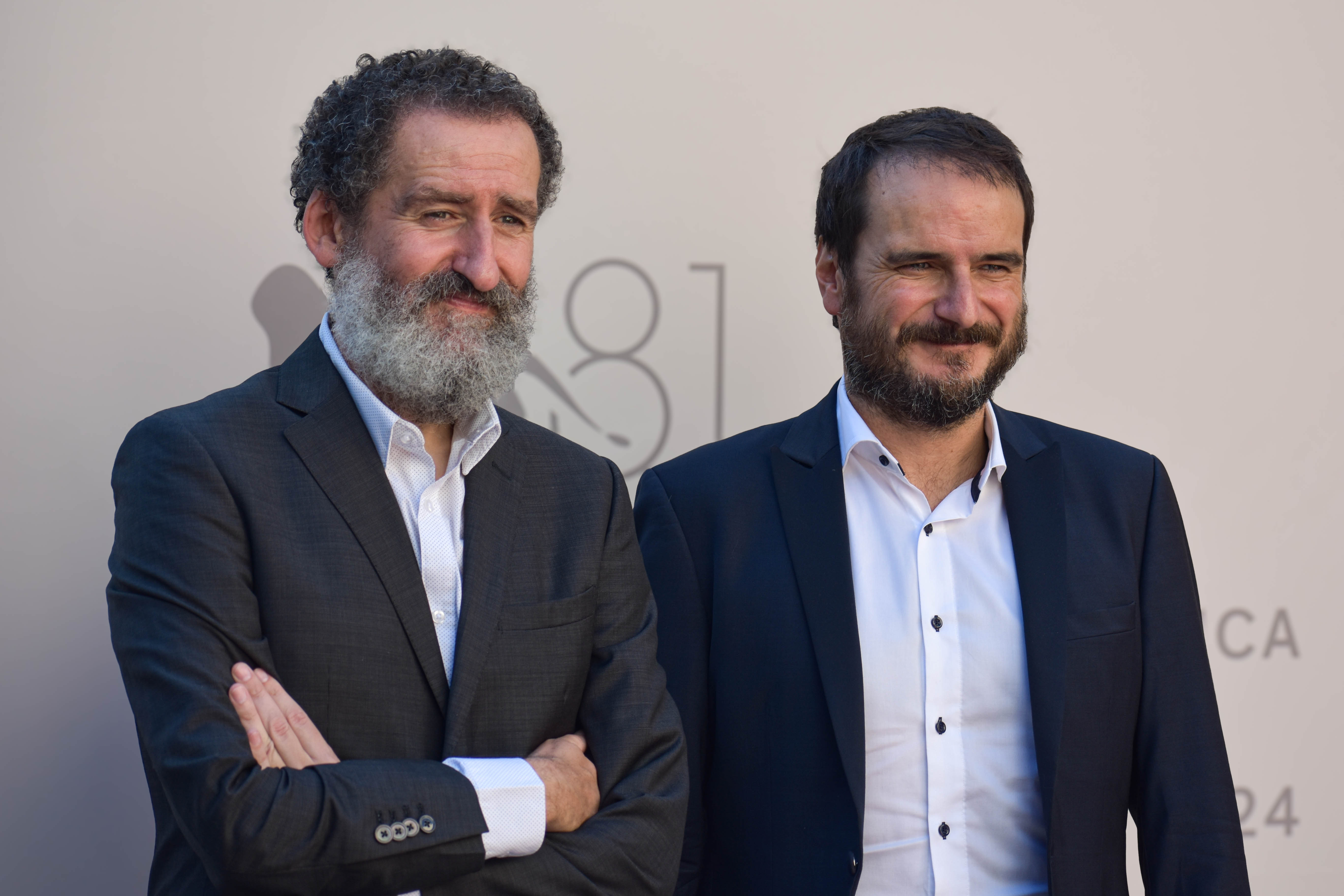
Directors Jon Garaño and Aitor Arregi attending the presentation of the film at the Venice Film Festival.

Marco had its world premiere in the Orizzonti section of the 81st Venice International Film Festival on 30 August 2024. Its festival run also included screenings at the 72nd San Sebastián International Film Festival, the 2024 BFI London Film Festival, and the 2024 Vancouver International Film Festival (for its North-American premiere). The film was released theatrically in Spain by BTeam Pictures on 8 November 2024. Film Factory acquired international sales rights. Epicentre Films scheduled a 14 May 2025 rollout in French theatres.

== Reception ==
=== Critical response ===
Marta Balaga of Cineuropa declared Marco to potentially be "one of the most watchable films at the Venice Film Festival this year" [being] "dynamic, twisted and blessed with the kind of performance by Eduard Fernández that should get him all the awards out there".

Andrea G. Bermejo of Cinemanía (also niece of Benito Bermejo) rated the film 4 out of 5 stars, writing that Eduard Fernández nails his performance.

In September 2024, the Academy of Cinematographic Arts and Sciences of Spain selected Marco for a shortlist of 3 films to determine their final submission for Best International Feature Film at the 97th Academy Awards.

=== Accolades ===
Year	Award	Category	Nominee(s)	Result	Ref.
2024	30th Forqué Awards	Best Actor in a Film	Eduard Fernández	Won	
2025	12th Feroz Awards	Best Main Actor in a Film	Eduard Fernández	Won	
2025	12th Feroz Awards	Best Trailer	Omar Bermúdez, Carlos Berot	Nominated	
2025	4th Carmen Awards	Best Non-Andalusian Produced Film		Nominated	
2025	80th CEC Medals	Best Actor	Eduard Fernández	Won	
2025	80th CEC Medals	Best Editing	Maialen Sarasua Oliden	Nominated	
2025	39th Goya Awards	Best Director	Aitor Arregi, Jon Garaño	Nominated	
2025	39th Goya Awards	Best Original Screenplay	Aitor Arregi, Jon Garaño, Jorge Gil Munarriz, Jose Mari Goenaga	Nominated	
2025	39th Goya Awards	Best Actor	Eduard Fernández	Won	
2025	39th Goya Awards	Best Makeup and Hairstyles	Karmele Soler, Sergio Pérez Berbel & Nacho Díaz	Won	
2025	39th Goya Awards	Best Special Effects	Jon Serrano, Mariano García Marty, David Heras	Nominated	
2025	33rd Actors and Actresses Union Awards	Best Film Actor in a Leading Role	Eduard Fernández	Won	
2025	12th Platino Awards	Best Actor	Eduard Fernández	Won	

== See also ==
- List of Spanish films of 2024
