= Silver Shell for Best Director =

Award at San Sebastian Film Festival

- 2026 recipient: Amanda Kernell
- Awarded for: Best direction
- Country: Spain
- Presented by: San Sebastián International Film Festival
- First award: 1953
- Currently held by: Amanda Kernell for Brace Your Heart
- Website: sansebastianfestival.com

The Silver Shell for Best Director (Spanish: Concha de Plata al Mejor Director; Basque: Zuzendari Onenaren Zilarrezko Maskorra) is one of the main awards presented at the San Sebastián Film Festival to the director of a competing film.

Swedish filmmaker Amanda Kernell was the most recent winner for Brace Your Heart in 2026.

== Winners ==
=== 1950s ===
Year	Director(s)	English Title	Original Title
1953	Rafael Gil	I Was a Parish Priest	La guerra de Dios
1954	Pedro Lazaga	La patrulla	
1956	Pietro Germi	The Railroad Man	Il ferroviere
1957	Alfréd Radok	Vintage Car	Dědeček automobil
1957	O. W. Fischer	Ich suche Dich	
1958	Alfred Hitchcock	Vertigo	
1959	Alfred Hitchcock	North by Northwest	
1959	Folco Quilici	Dagli Appennini alle Ande	

=== 1960s ===
Year	Director(s)	English Title	Original Title
1960	Sidney Lumet	The Fugitive Kind	
1961	Alberto Lattuada	The Mishap	L'imprevisto
1962	Mauro Bolognini	Careless	Senilità
1963	Robert Enrico	In the Midst of Life	Au coeur de la vie
1964	Miguel Picazo	Aunt Tula	La Tía Tula
1965	Mario Monicelli	Casanova 70	
1966	Mauro Bolognini	Madamigella di Maupin	
1967	Janusz Morgenstern	Jowita	
1968	Peter Collinson	The Long Day's Dying	

=== 1970s ===
Year	Director(s)	English Title	Original Title
1977	Alf Brustellin and Bernhard Sinkel	Maiden's War	
1978	Manuel Gutiérrez Aragón	Sleepwalkers	Sonámbulos
1979	Pál Gábor	Angi Vera	

=== 1980s ===
Year	Director(s)	English Title	Original Title
1984	Valeria Sarmiento	Notre mariage	
1985	Francisco José Lombardi	The City and the Dogs	La ciudad y los perros
1986	Axel Corti	Welcome in Vienna	
1987	Dominique Deruddere	Crazy Love	
1988	Gonzalo Suárez	Rowing with the Wind	Remando al viento
1989	Mirosław Bork	Konsul	

=== 1990s ===
Year	Director(s)	English Title	Original Title
1990	Joel Coen	Miller's Crossing	
1991	Bruce McDonald	Highway 61	
1992	Goran Marković	Tito and Me	Tito i ja
1993	Philippe Lioret	Lost in Transit	Tombés du ciel
1994	Danny Boyle	Shallow Grave	
1995	Mike Figgis	Leaving Las Vegas	
1996	Francisco José Lombardi	Bajo la piel	
1997	Claude Chabrol	The Swindle	Rien ne va plus
1998	Fernando León de Aranoa	Barrio	
1999	Zhang Yang	Shower	洗澡
1999	Michel Deville	Sachs' Disease	La Maladie de Sachs

=== 2000s ===
Year	Director(s)	English Title	Original Title
2000	Reza Parsa	Before the Storm	Före Stormen
2001	Jean-Pierre Améris	C'est la vie	
2002	Chen Kaige	Together	和你在一起
2003	Bong Joon Ho	Memories of Murder	살인의 추억
2004	Xu Jinglei	Letter from an Unknown Woman	一個陌生女人的來信
2005	Zhang Yang	Sunflower	向日葵
2006	Tom DiCillo	Delirious	
2007	Nick Broomfield	Battle for Haditha	
2008	Michael Winterbottom	Genova	
2009	Javier Rebollo	Woman Without Piano	La mujer sin piano

=== 2010s ===
Year	Director(s)	English Title	Original Title
2010	Raúl Ruiz	Mysteries of Lisbon	Mistérios de Lisboa
2011	Filippos Tsitos	Unfair World	Adikos Kosmos
2012	Fernando Trueba	The Artist and the Model	El artista y la modelo
2013	Fernando Eimbcke	Club Sandwich	Club Sándwich
2014	Carlos Vermut	Magical Girl	
2015	Joachim Lafosse	The White Knights	Les Chevaliers Blancs
2016	Hong Sang-soo	Yourself and Yours	당신자신과 당신의 것
2017	Anahí Berneri	Alanis	
2018	Benjamín Naishtat	Rojo	
2019	Jon Garaño, Aitor Arregi and Jose Mari Goenaga	The Endless Trench	La Trinchera Infinita

=== 2020s ===
Year	Director(s)	English Title	Original Title
2020	Dea Kulumbegashvili	Beginning	დასაწყისი
2021	Tea Lindeburg	As in Heaven	Du Som Er I Himlen
2022	Genki Kawamura	A Hundred Flowers	
2025	Joachim Lafosse	Six Days in Spring	Six jours ce printemps-là
2026	Amanda Kernell	Brace Your Heart	Garrat du váimmu

== See also ==
- Golden Shell
