= Goya Award for Best Director =

Annual award by the Spanish Film Academy

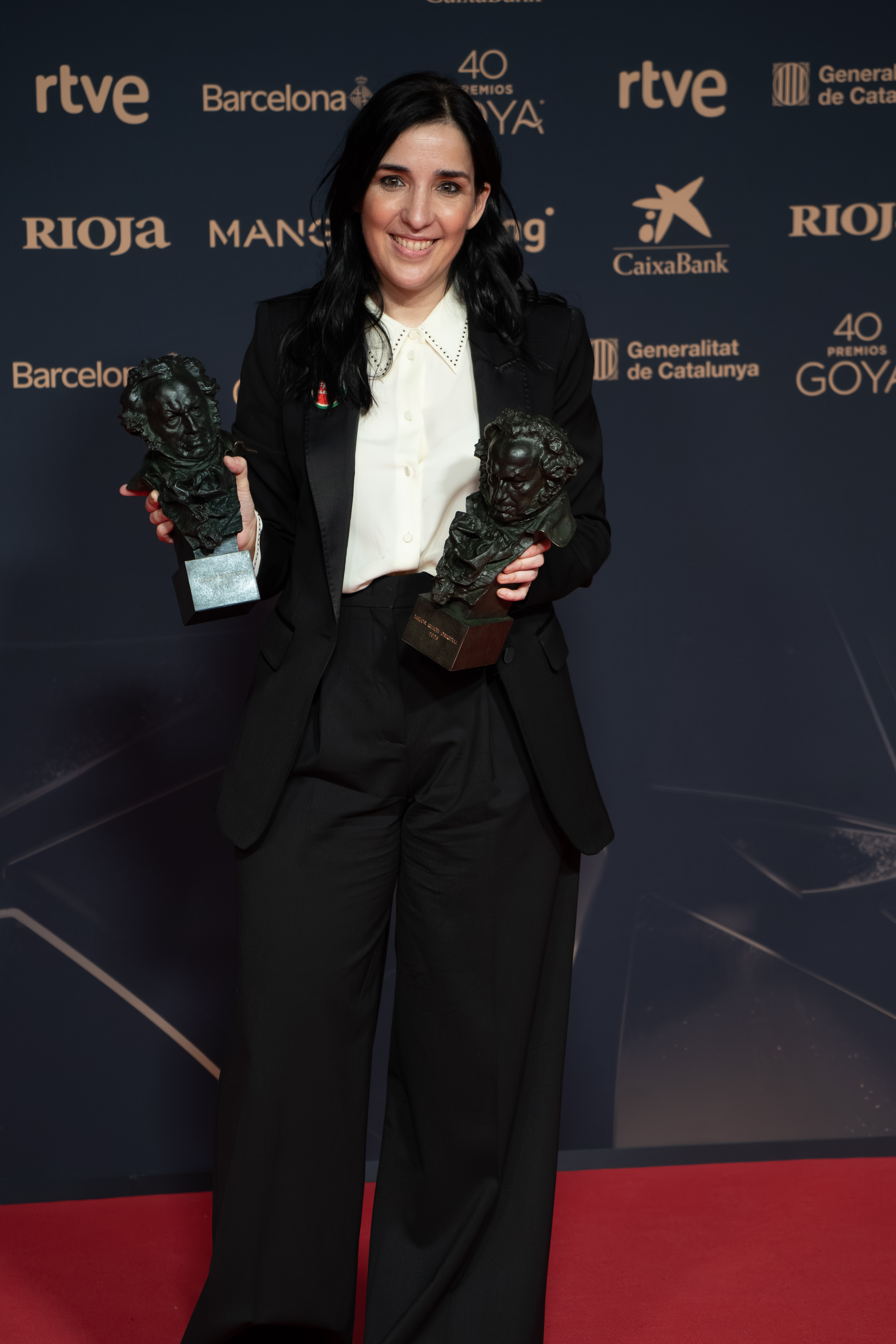
- The 2026 recipient: Alauda Ruiz de Azúa
- Native name: Premio Goya a la mejor dirección
- Awarded for: Best direction of a Spanish film of the year
- Country: Spain
- Presented by: Academy of Cinematographic Arts and Sciences of Spain (AACCE)
- First award: 1st Goya Awards (1986)
- Most recent winner: Alauda Ruiz de Azúa; Sundays (2025)
- Website: Official website

The Goya Award for Best Director (Spanish: Premio Goya a la mejor dirección) is one of the Goya Awards presented annually by the Academy of Cinematographic Arts and Sciences of Spain (AACCE) since the awards debuted in 1986. It is given in honor of a film director or directing team that has demonstrated outstanding directing ability in making a Spanish film.

== History ==
The category has been presented ever since the first edition of the Goya Awards. Fernando Fernán Gómez was the first winner of this award for his film Voyage to Nowhere.

Pedro Almodóvar holds the record of most wins and nominations for this category, with three wins out of twelve nominations, winning for All About My Mother (1999), Volver (2006) and Pain and Glory (2019). Fernando León de Aranoa, who won for Barrio (1998), Mondays in the Sun (2002) and The Good Boss (2021), and J. A. Bayona, who won for The Impossible (2012), A Monster Calls (2015), and Society of the Snow (2023), share the record of most wins. Directors Fernando Trueba, Alejandro Amenábar, Isabel Coixet, and Rodrigo Sorogoyen have received this award twice. As of 2025, only three female directors have received the award: Pilar Miró, Icíar Bollaín and Isabel Coixet, the latter being the only woman to win the award twice.

In 2024, Isaki Lacuesta and Pol Rodríguez became the first directing duo to win the award, for their work in Saturn Return. In 2025, with his nomination for Afternoons of Solitude, Albert Serra became the first director to be nominated for the award for a non-fiction film.

In the list below the winner of the award for each year is shown first, followed by the other nominees.

== Winners and nominees ==
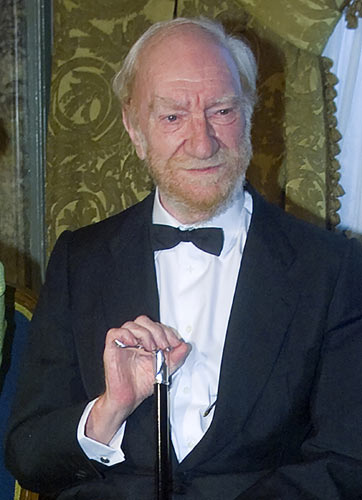
Fernando Fernán Gómez was the first winner of this award for Voyage to Nowhere (1986).

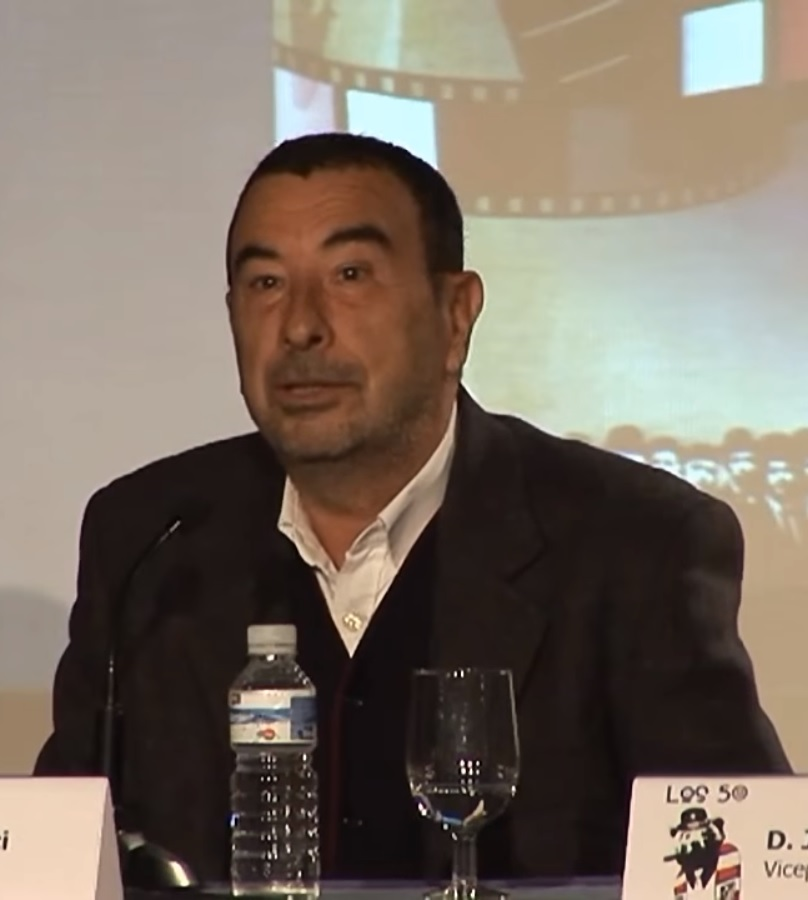
José Luis Garci won for Course Completed (1987).

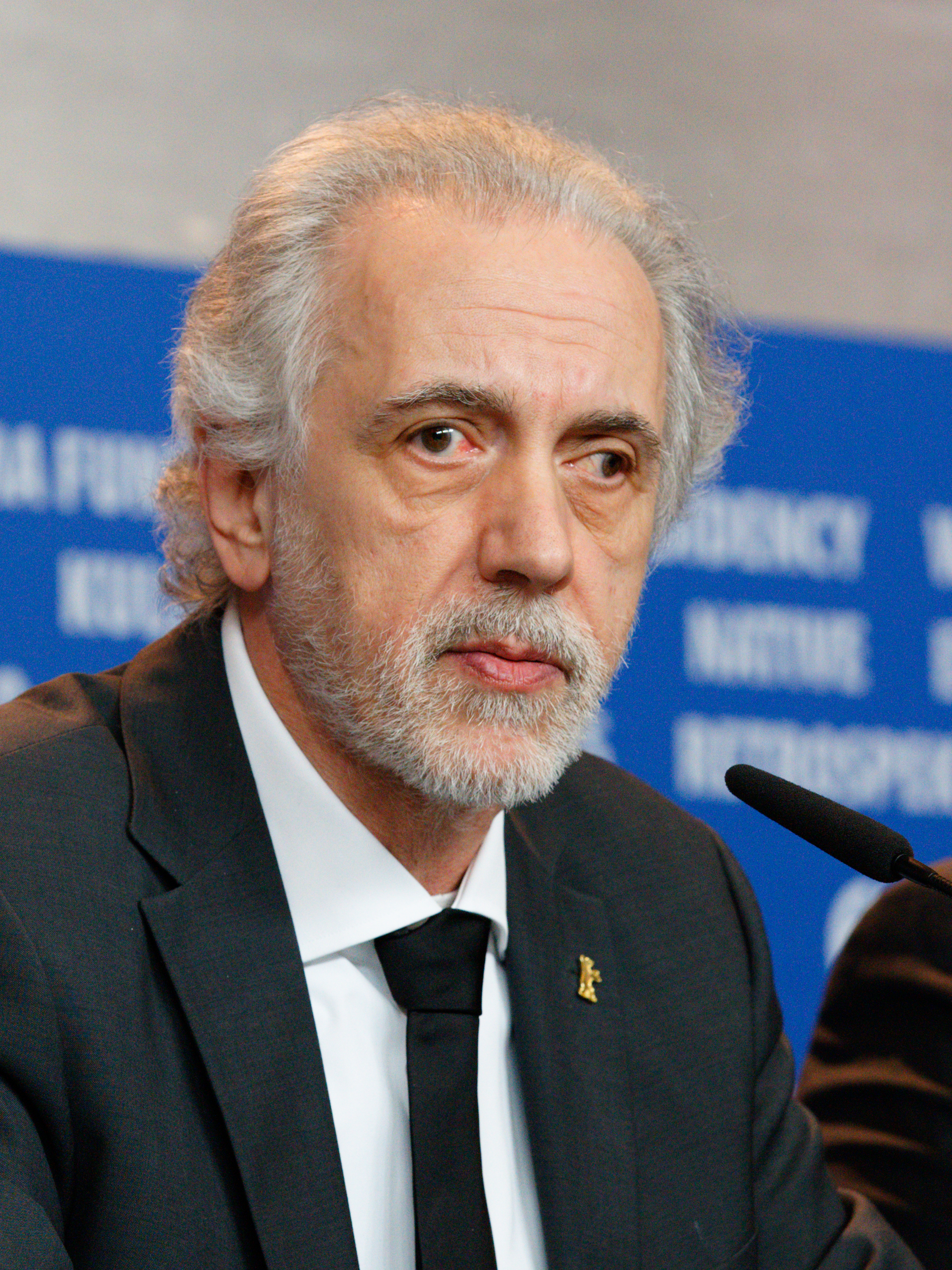
Fernando Trueba has won this award twice, for Twisted Obsession (1989) and Belle Époque (1992).

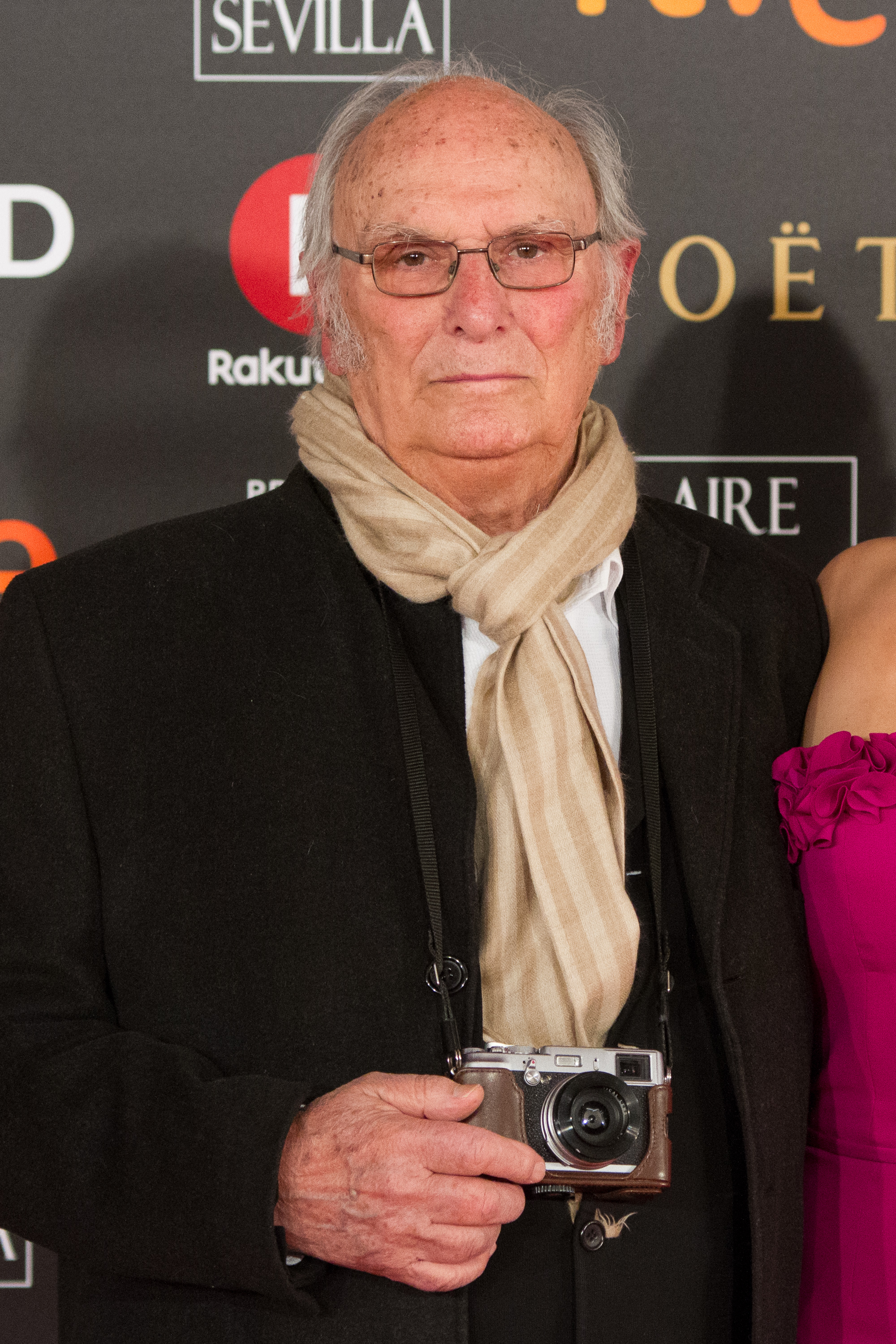
Carlos Saura won for ¡Ay, Carmela! (1990).

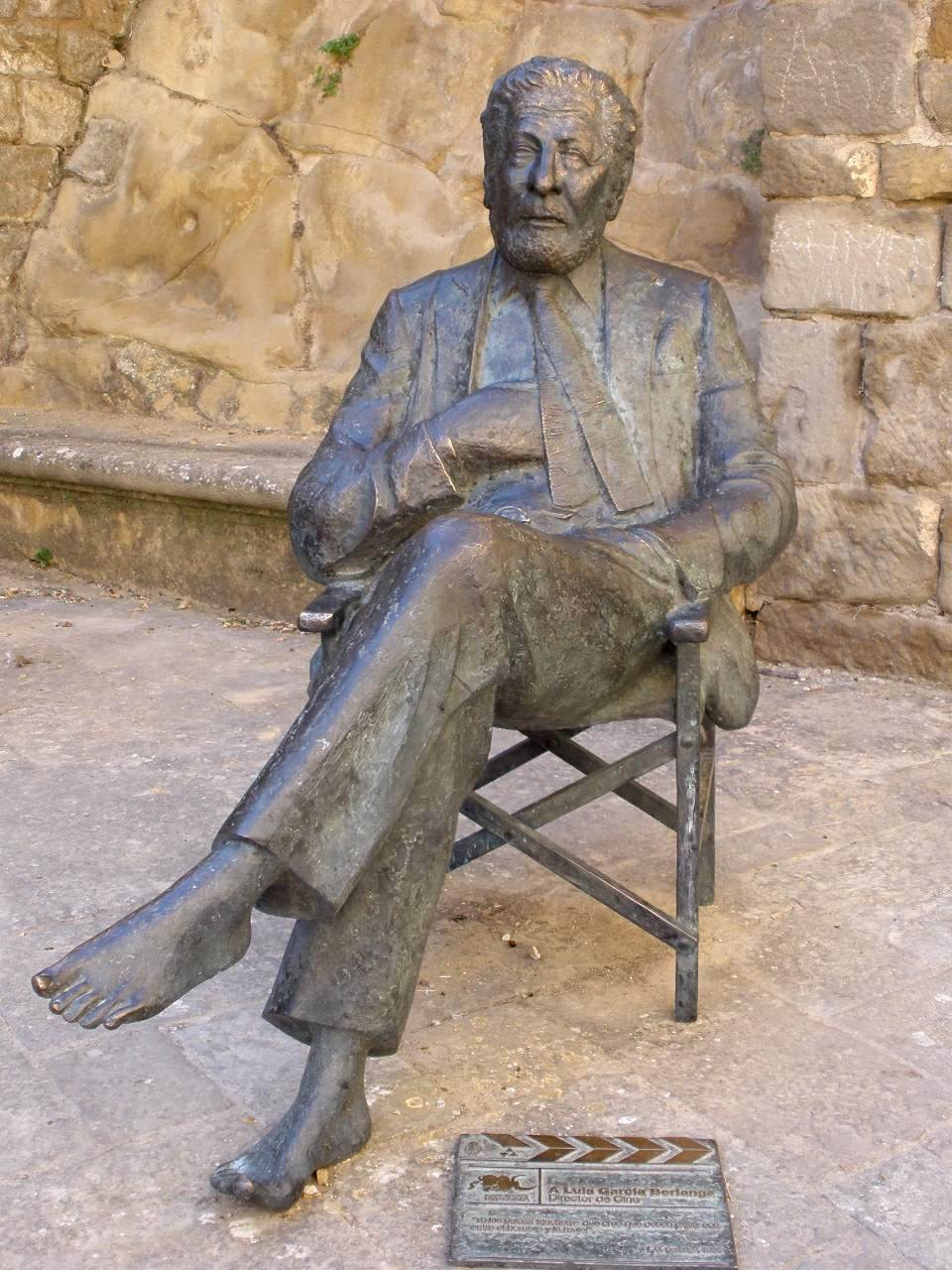
Luis García Berlanga won for Everyone Off to Jail (1993).

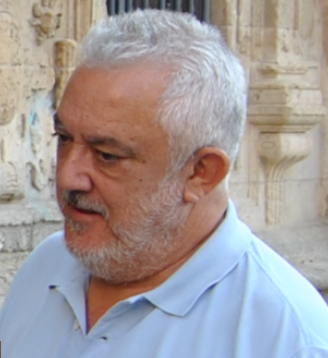
Imanol Uribe won for Running Out of Time (1994).

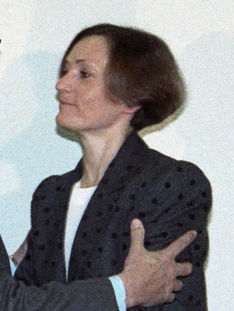
Pilar Miró won for The Dog in the Manger (1996).

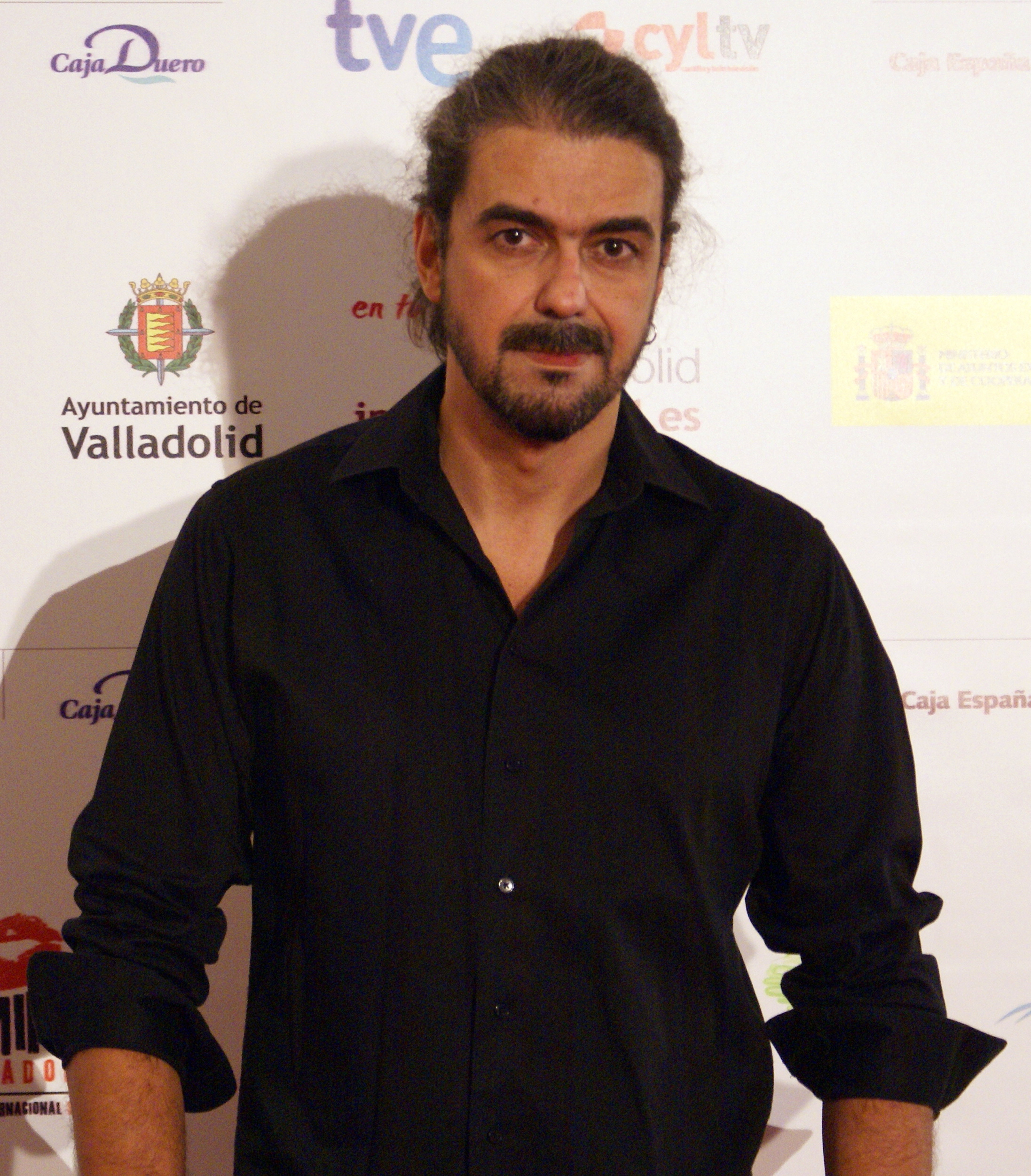
Fernando León de Aranoa has won thrice, for Barrio (1998), Mondays in the Sun (2002), and The Good Boss (2021).

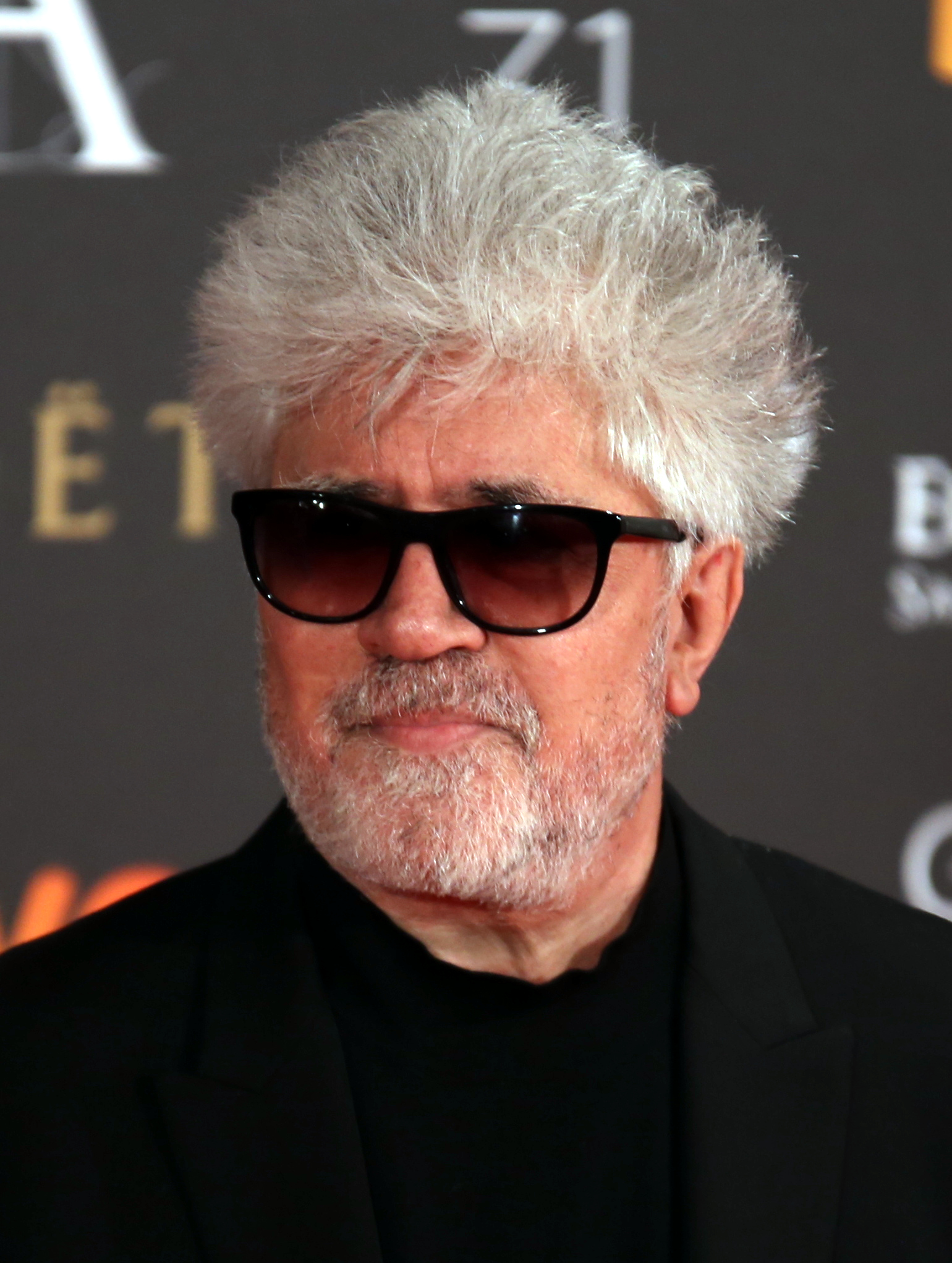
Pedro Almodóvar has won this award three times, for All About My Mother (1999), Volver (2006) and Pain and Glory (2019).

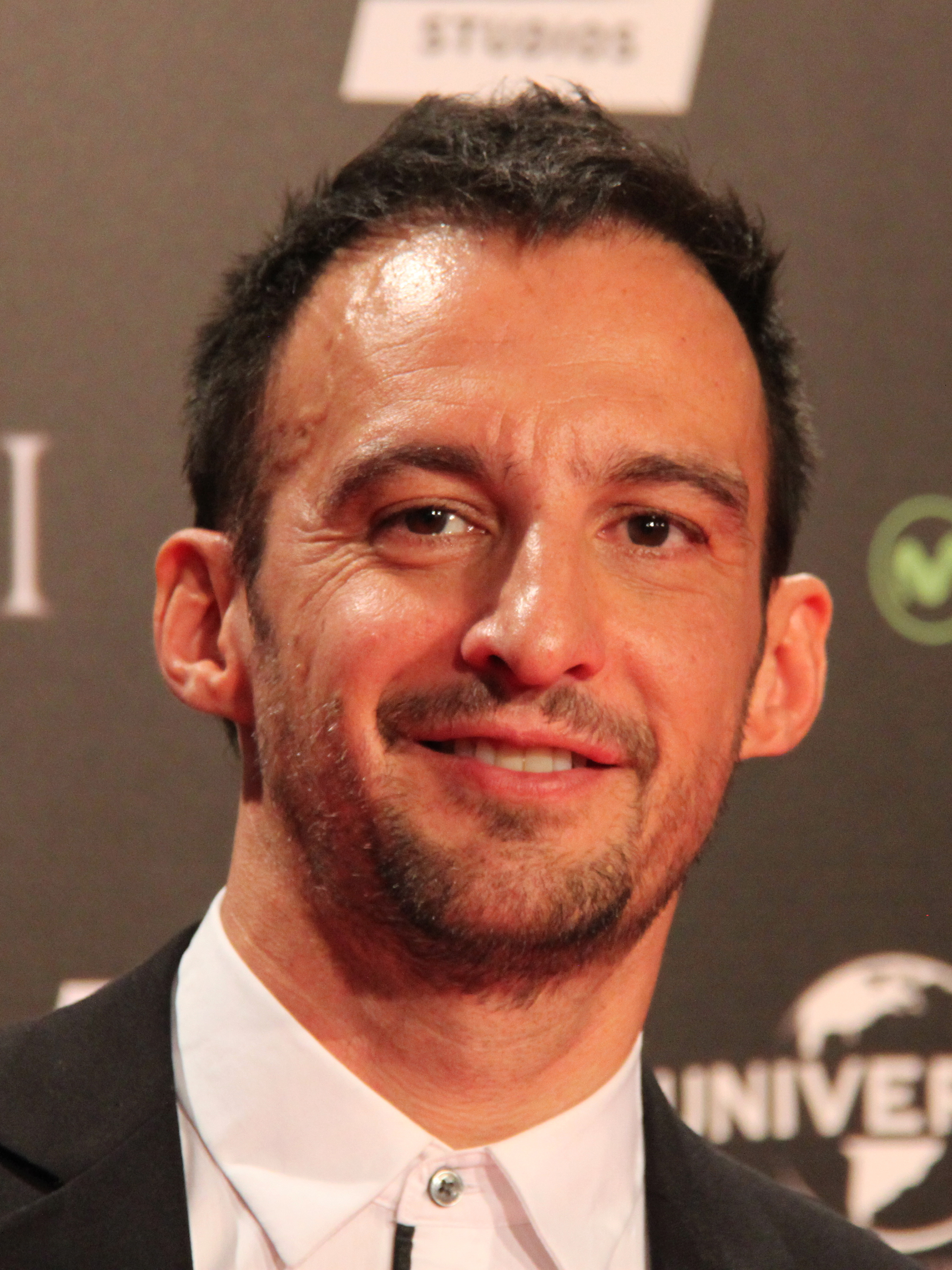
Alejandro Amenábar has won twice, for The Others (2001) and The Sea Inside (2004).

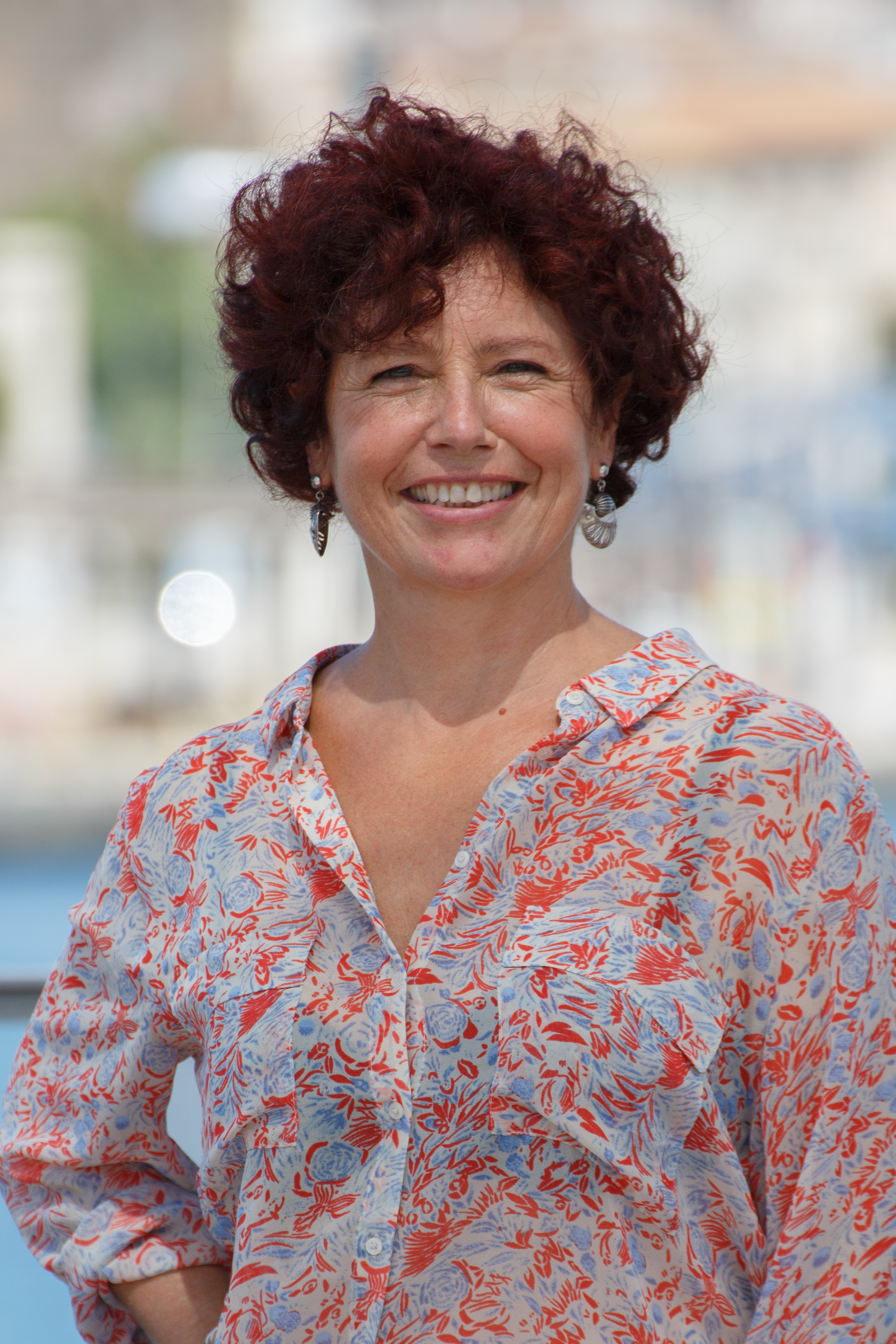
Icíar Bollaín won for Take My Eyes (2003).

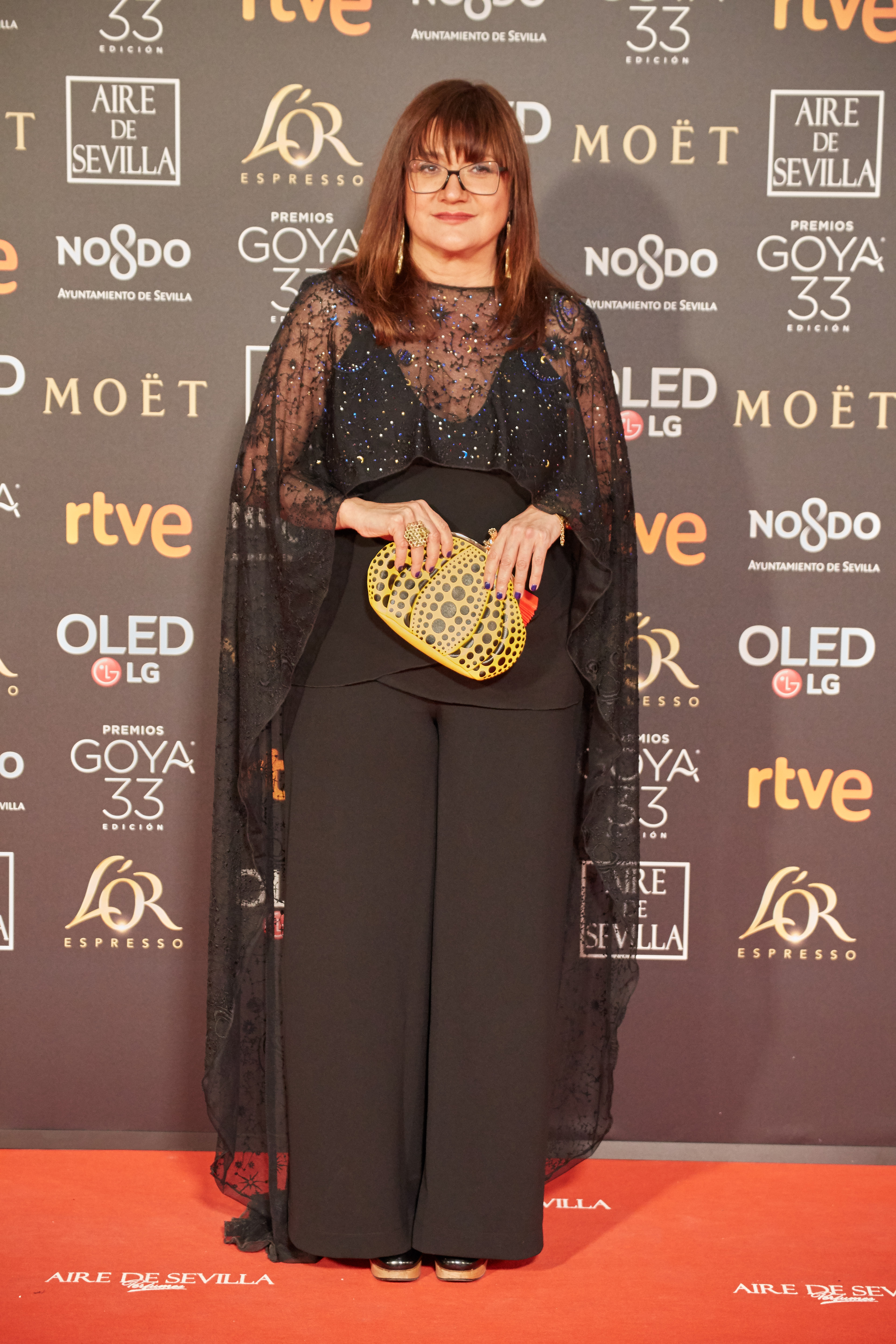
Isabel Coixet has won twice, for The Secret Life of Words (2005) and The Bookshop (2017).

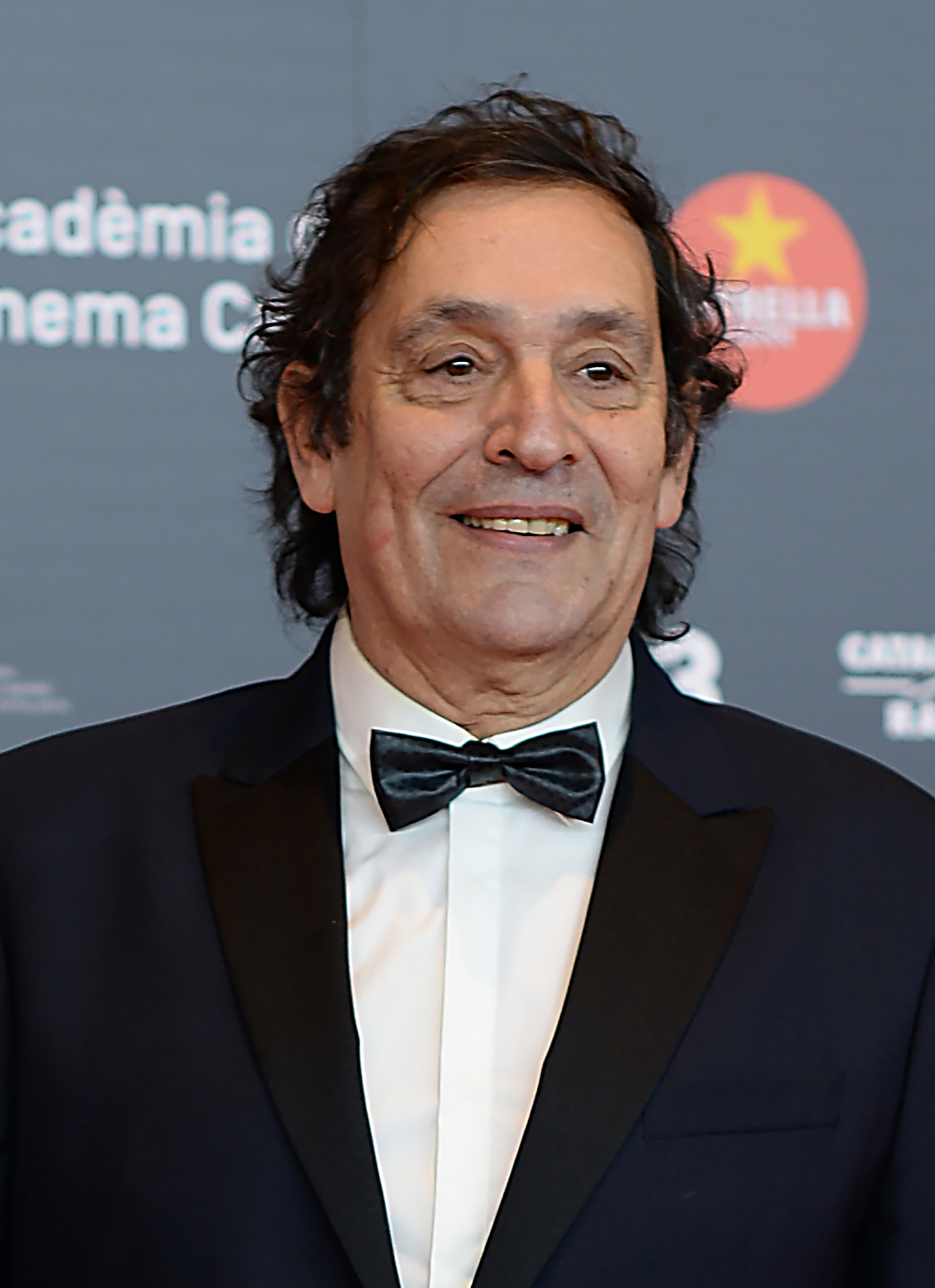
Agustí Villaronga won for Black Bread (2010).

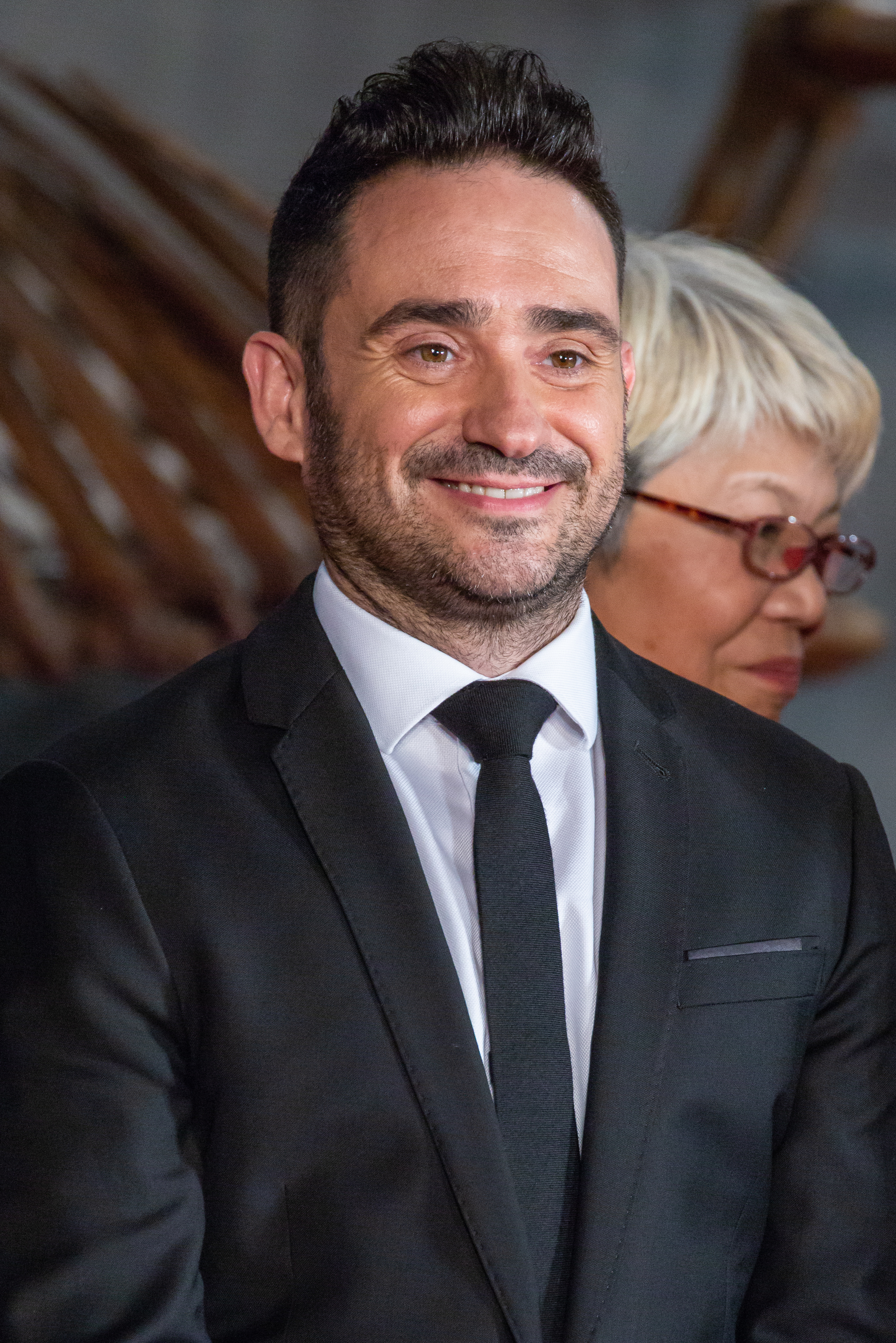
Juan Antonio Bayona has won thrice, The Impossible (2012), A Monster Calls (2016) and Society of the Snow (2023).

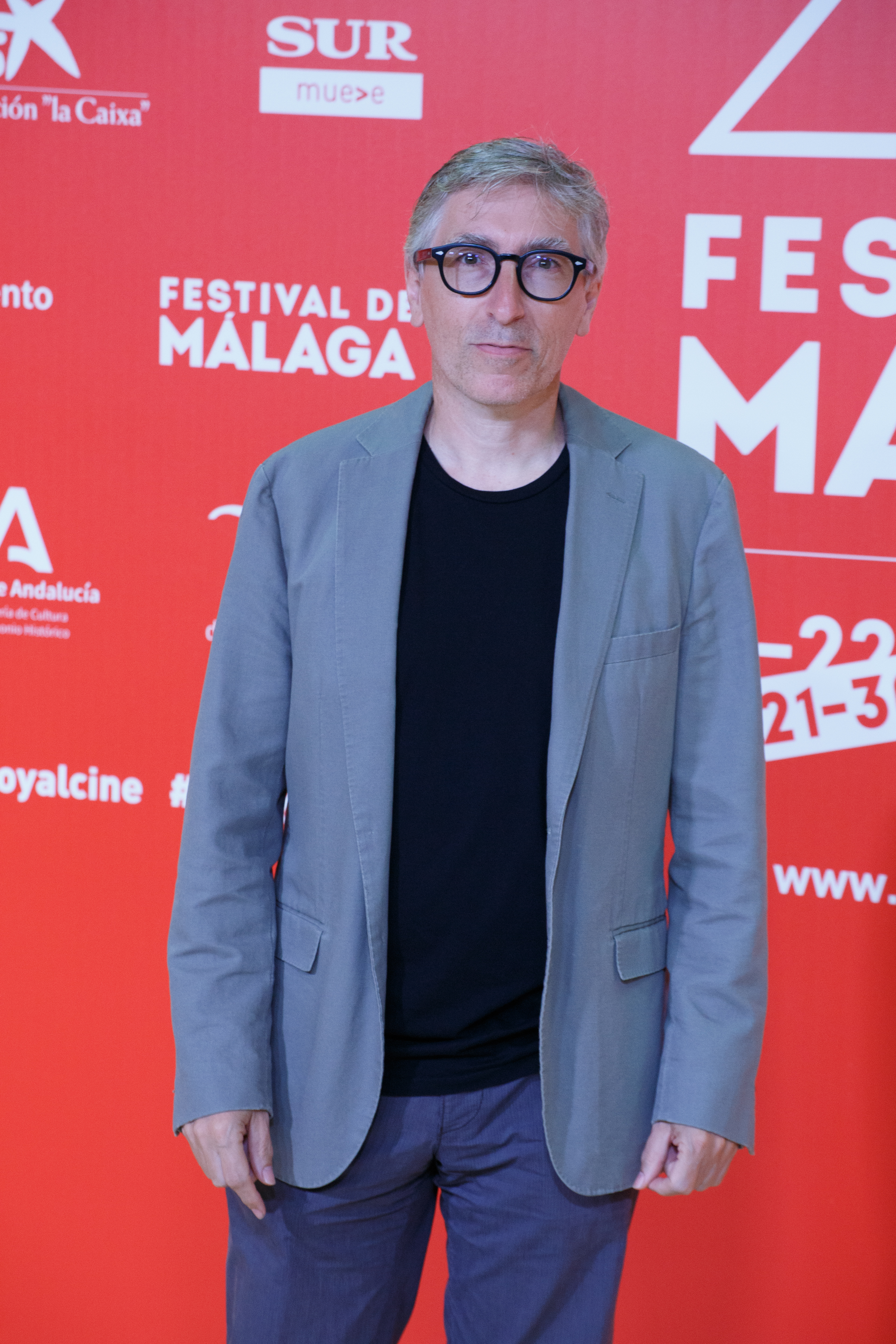
David Trueba won for Living Is Easy with Eyes Closed (2013).

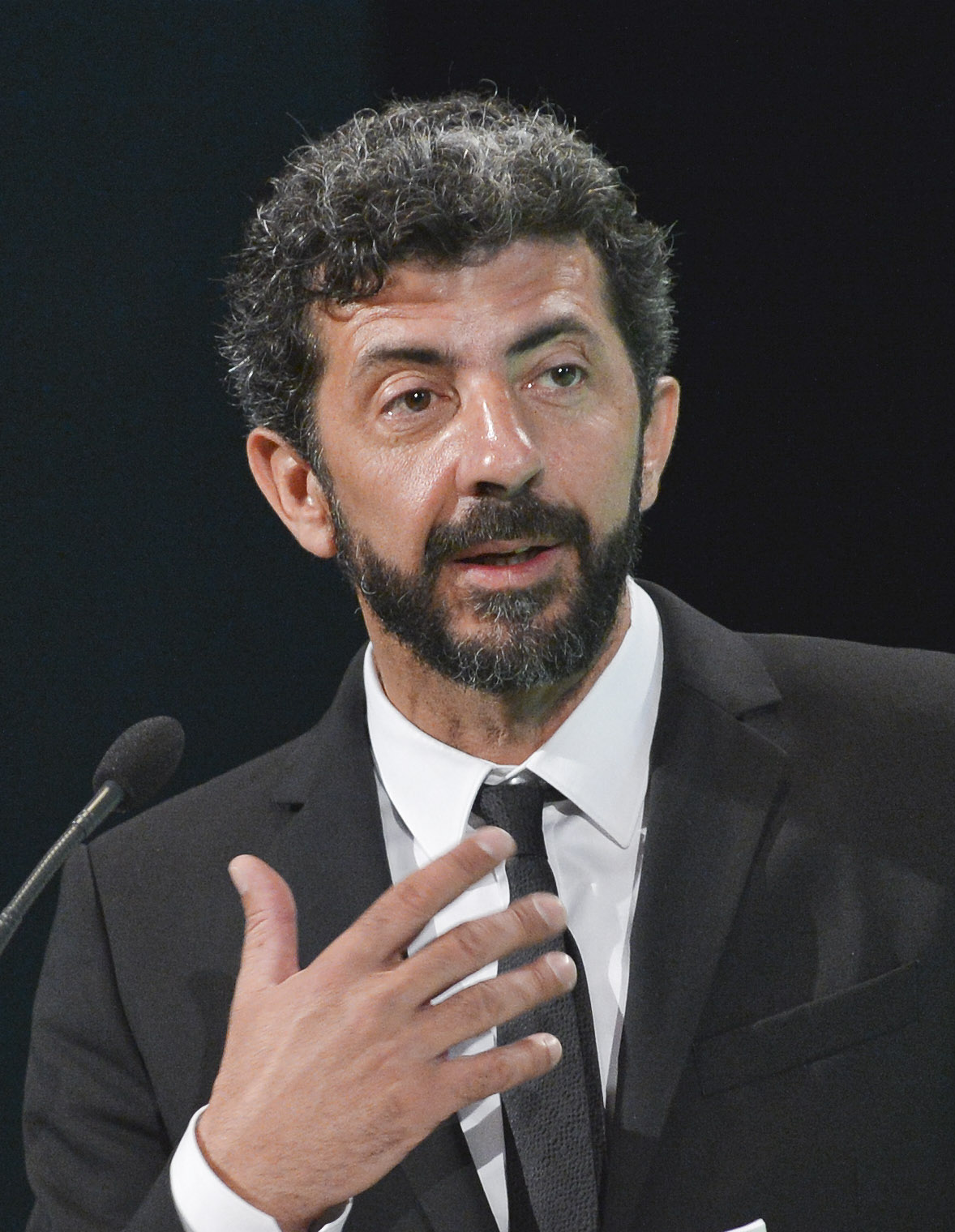
Alberto Rodríguez won for Marshland (2014).

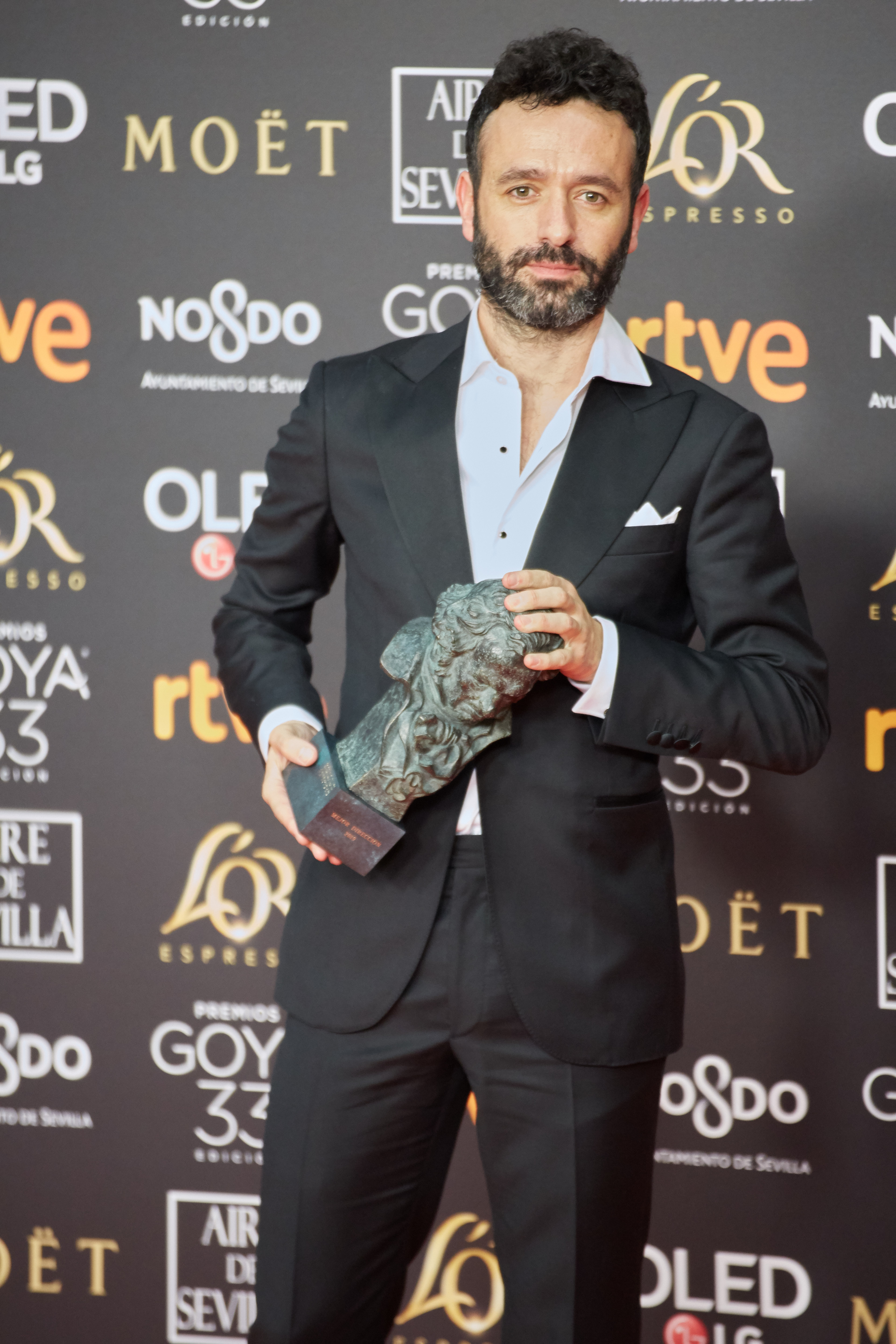
Rodrigo Sorogoyen has won twice, for The Realm (2018) and The Beasts (2022).

Table key
‡	Indicates the winner

=== 1980s ===
Year	Director	English title	Original title
1986 (1st)	Fernando Fernán Gómez	Voyage to Nowhere	El viaje a ninguna parte
1986 (1st)	Emilio Martínez Lázaro	Lulu by Night	Lulú de noche
1986 (1st)	Pilar Miró	Werther	
1987 (2nd)	José Luis Garci	Course Completed	Asignatura aprobada
1987 (2nd)	Bigas Luna	Anguish	Angustia
1987 (2nd)	Vicente Aranda	El Lute: Run for Your Life	El Lute: camina o revienta
1988 (3rd)	Gonzalo Suárez	Rowing with the Wind	Remando al viento
1988 (3rd)	Pedro Almodóvar	Women on the Verge of a Nervous Breakdown	Mujeres al borde de un ataque de nervios
1988 (3rd)	Ricardo Franco	Berlin Blues	
1988 (3rd)	Antonio Mercero	Wait for Me in Heaven	Espérame en el cielo
1988 (3rd)	Francisco Regueiro	Winter Diary	Diario de invierno
1989 (4th)	Fernando Trueba	Twisted Obsession	El sueño del mono loco
1989 (4th)	Vicente Aranda	If They Tell You I Fell	Si te dicen que caí
1989 (4th)	Fernando Fernán Gómez	The Sea and the Weather	El mar y el tiempo
1989 (4th)	Josefina Molina	Esquilache	
1989 (4th)	Agustí Villaronga	Moon Child	El niño de la luna

=== 1990s ===
Year	Director	English title	Original title
1990 (5th)	Carlos Saura	¡Ay, Carmela!	
1990 (5th)	Pedro Almodóvar	Tie Me Up! Tie Me Down!	¡Átame!
1990 (5th)	Montxo Armendáriz	Letters from Alou	Las cartas de Alou
1991 (6th)	Vicente Aranda	Lovers	Amantes
1991 (6th)	Pilar Miró	Prince of Shadows	Beltenebros
1991 (6th)	Imanol Uribe	The Dumbfounded King	El rey pasmado
1992 (7th)	Fernando Trueba	Belle Époque	
1992 (7th)	Bigas Luna	A Tale of Ham and Passion	Jamón, jamón
1992 (7th)	Pedro Olea	The Fencing Master	El maestro de esgrima
1993 (8th)	Luis García Berlanga	Everyone to Jail	Todos a la cárcel
1993 (8th)	Vicente Aranda	Intruder	Intruso
1993 (8th)	Juanma Bajo Ulloa	The Dead Mother	La madre muerta
1994 (9th)	Imanol Uribe	Running Out of Time	Días contados
1994 (9th)	Vicente Aranda	Turkish Passion	La pasión turca
1994 (9th)	José Luis Garci	Cradle Song	Canción de cuna
1995 (10th)	Álex de la Iglesia	The Day of the Beast	El día de la bestia
1995 (10th)	Pedro Almodóvar	The Flower of My Secret	La flor de mi secreto
1995 (10th)	Manuel Gómez Pereira	Mouth to Mouth	Boca a boca
1996 (11th)	Pilar Miró	The Dog in the Manger	El perro del hortelano
1996 (11th)	Julio Medem	Earth	Tierra
1996 (11th)	Imanol Uribe	Bwana	
1997 (12th)	Ricardo Franco	The Lucky Star	La buena estrella
1997 (12th)	Adolfo Aristarain	Martín (Hache)	
1997 (12th)	Montxo Armendáriz	Secrets of the Heart	Secretos del corazón
1998 (13th)	Fernando León de Aranoa	Barrio	
1998 (13th)	Alejandro Amenábar	Open Your Eyes	Abre los ojos
1998 (13th)	José Luis Garci	The Grandfather	El abuelo
1998 (13th)	Fernando Trueba	The Girl of Your Dreams	La niña de tus ojos
1999 (14th)	Pedro Almodóvar	All About My Mother	Todo sobre mi madre
1999 (14th)	José Luis Cuerda	Butterfly's Tongue	La lengua de las mariposas
1999 (14th)	Gracia Querejeta	By My Side Again	Cuando vuelvas a mi lado
1999 (14th)	Benito Zambrano	Solas	

=== 2000s ===
Year	Director	English title	Original title
2000 (15th)	José Luis Borau	Leo	
2000 (15th)	Jaime Chávarri	Kisses for Everyone	Besos para todos
2000 (15th)	Álex de la Iglesia	Common Wealth	La comunidad
2000 (15th)	José Luis Garci	You're the One	Una historia de entonces
2001 (16th)	Alejandro Amenábar	The Others	Los Otros
2001 (16th)	Vicente Aranda	Mad Love	Juana la Loca
2001 (16th)	Agustín Díaz	Don't Tempt Me	Sin noticias de Dios
2001 (16th)	Julio Medem	Sex and Lucia	Lucía y el sexo
2002 (17th)	Fernando León de Aranoa	Mondays in the Sun	Los lunes al sol
2002 (17th)	Pedro Almodóvar	Talk to Her	Hable con ella
2002 (17th)	Antonio Hernández	In the City Without Limits	En la ciudad sin límites
2002 (17th)	Emilio Martínez Lázaro	The Other Side of the Bed	El otro lado de la cama
2003 (18th)	Icíar Bollaín	Take My Eyes	Te doy mis ojos
2003 (18th)	Isabel Coixet	My Life Without Me	Mi vida sin mí
2003 (18th)	Cesc Gay	In the City	En la ciudad
2003 (18th)	David Trueba	Soldiers of Salamina	Soldados de Salamina
2004 (19th)	Alejandro Amenábar	The Sea Inside	Mar adentro
2004 (19th)	Pedro Almodóvar	Bad Education	La mala educación
2004 (19th)	Adolfo Aristarain	Roma	
2004 (19th)	Carlos Saura	The Seventh Day	El séptimo día
2005 (20th)	Isabel Coixet	The Secret Life of Words	La vida secreta de las palabras
2005 (20th)	Montxo Armendáriz	Obaba	
2005 (20th)	Alberto Rodríguez	7 Virgins	7 vírgenes
2005 (20th)	Benito Zambrano	Habana Blues	
2006 (21st)	Pedro Almodóvar	Volver	
2006 (21st)	Agustín Díaz	Alatriste	
2006 (21st)	Manuel Huerga	Salvador	
2006 (21st)	Guillermo del Toro	Pan's Labyrinth	El laberinto del fauno
2007 (22nd)	Jaime Rosales	Solitary Fragments	La soledad
2007 (22nd)	Icíar Bollaín	Mataharis	
2007 (22nd)	Emilio Martínez Lázaro	13 Roses	Las 13 rosas
2007 (22nd)	Gracia Querejeta	Seven Billiard Tables	Siete mesas de billar francés
2008 (23rd)	Javier Fesser	Camino	
2008 (23rd)	José Luis Cuerda	The Blind Sunflowers	Los girasoles ciegos
2008 (23rd)	Agustín Díaz	Just Walking	Sólo quiero caminar
2008 (23rd)	Álex de la Iglesia	The Oxford Murders	
2009 (24th)	Daniel Monzón	Cell 211	Celda 211
2009 (24th)	Juan José Campanella	The Secret in Their Eyes	El secreto de sus ojos
2009 (24th)	Alejandro Amenábar	Agora	Ágora
2009 (24th)	Fernando Trueba	The Dancer and the Thief	El baile de la victoria

=== 2010s ===
Year	Director	English title	Original title
2010 (25th)	Agustí Villaronga	Black Bread	Pa negre (Pan negro)
2010 (25th)	Rodrigo Cortés	Buried	
2010 (25th)	Álex de la Iglesia	The Last Circus	Balada triste de trompeta
2010 (25th)	Icíar Bollaín	Even the Rain	También la lluvia
2011 (26th)	Enrique Urbizu	No Rest for the Wicked	No habrá paz para los malvados
2011 (26th)	Pedro Almodóvar	The Skin I Live In	La Piel que habito
2011 (26th)	Mateo Gil	Blackthorn	
2011 (26th)	Benito Zambrano	The Sleeping Voice	La voz dormida
2012 (27th)	J. A. Bayona	The Impossible	Lo imposible
2012 (27th)	Pablo Berger	Blancanieves	
2012 (27th)	Alberto Rodríguez	Unit 7	Grupo 7
2012 (27th)	Fernando Trueba	The Artist and the Model	El artista y la modelo
2013 (28th)	David Trueba	Living Is Easy with Eyes Closed	Vivir es fácil con los ojos cerrados
2013 (28th)	Gracia Querejeta	15 Years and One Day	15 años y un día
2013 (28th)	Manuel Martín Cuenca	Cannibal	Caníbal
2013 (28th)	Daniel Sánchez Arévalo	Family United	La gran familia española
2014 (29th)	Alberto Rodríguez	Marshland	La isla mínima
2014 (29th)	Daniel Monzón	El Niño	
2014 (29th)	Carlos Vermut	Magical Girl	
2014 (29th)	Damián Szifrón	Wild Tales	Relatos salvajes
2015 (30th)	Cesc Gay	Truman	
2015 (30th)	Paula Ortiz	The Bride	La novia
2015 (30th)	Isabel Coixet	Nobody Wants the Night	Nadie quiere la noche
2015 (30th)	Fernando León de Aranoa	A Perfect Day	Un día perfecto
2016 (31st)	J. A. Bayona	A Monster Calls	
2016 (31st)	Pedro Almodóvar	Julieta	
2016 (31st)	Alberto Rodríguez	Smoke & Mirrors	El hombre de las mil caras
2016 (31st)	Rodrigo Sorogoyen	May God Save Us	Que Dios nos perdone
2017 (32nd)	Isabel Coixet	The Bookshop	La librería
2017 (32nd)	Aitor Arregi and Jon Garaño	Giant	Handia
2017 (32nd)	Manuel Martín Cuenca	The Motive	El autor
2017 (32nd)	Paco Plaza	Veronica	Verónica
2018 (33rd)	Rodrigo Sorogoyen	The Realm	El reino
2018 (33rd)	Javier Fesser	Champions	Campeones
2018 (33rd)	Isaki Lacuesta	Between Two Waters	Entre dos aguas
2018 (33rd)	Asghar Farhadi	Everybody Knows	Todos lo saben
2019 (34th)	Pedro Almodóvar	Pain and Glory	Dolor y gloria
2019 (34th)	Alejandro Amenábar	While at War	Mientras dure la guerra
2019 (34th)	Aitor Arregi, Jon Garaño and José Mari Goenaga	The Endless Trench	La trinchera infinita
2019 (34th)	Oliver Laxe	Fire Will Come	O que arde

=== 2020s ===
Year	Director	English title	Original title
2020 (35th)	Salvador Calvo	Adú	
2020 (35th)	Juanma Bajo Ulloa	Baby	
2020 (35th)	Icíar Bollaín	Rosa's Wedding	La boda de Rosa
2020 (35th)	Isabel Coixet	It Snows in Benidorm	Nieva en Benidorm
2021 (36th)	Fernando León de Aranoa	The Good Boss	El buen patrón
2021 (36th)	Manuel Martín Cuenca	The Daughter	La hija
2021 (36th)	Icíar Bollaín	Maixabel	
2021 (36th)	Pedro Almodóvar	Parallel Mothers	Madres paralelas
2022 (37th)	Rodrigo Sorogoyen	The Beasts	As bestas
2022 (37th)	Carla Simón	Alcarràs	
2022 (37th)	Pilar Palomero	Motherhood	La maternal
2022 (37th)	Carlos Vermut	Manticore	Mantícora
2022 (37th)	Alberto Rodríguez	Prison 77	Modelo 77
2023 (38th)	J.A. Bayona	Society of the Snow	La sociedad de la nieve
2023 (38th)	Víctor Erice	Close Your Eyes	Cerrar los ojos
2023 (38th)	Isabel Coixet	Un amor	
2023 (38th)	David Trueba	Jokes & Cigarettes	Saben aquell
2023 (38th)	Elena Martín	Creatura	
2024 (39th)	Isaki Lacuesta, Pol Rodríguez	Saturn Return	Segundo premio
2024 (39th)	Pedro Almodóvar	The Room Next Door	La habitación de al lado
2024 (39th)	Arantxa Echevarría	Undercover	La infiltrada
2024 (39th)	Paula Ortiz	The Red Virgin	La virgen roja
2024 (39th)	Aitor Arregi, Jon Garaño	Marco, the Invented Truth	Marco, la verdad inventada
2025 (40th)	Alauda Ruiz de Azúa	Sundays	Los domingos
2025 (40th)	Aitor Arregi, Jose Mari Goenaga	Maspalomas	
2025 (40th)	Carla Simón	Romería	
2025 (40th)	Oliver Laxe	Sirāt	
2025 (40th)	Albert Serra	Afternoons of Solitude	Tardes de soledad

== Multiple nominations ==
The following 37 directors have received multiple Best Director nominations.

Name	Awards	Nominations
Pedro Almodóvar	3	12
Fernando León de Aranoa	3	4
J. A. Bayona	3	3
Isabel Coixet	2	6
Fernando Trueba	2	5
Alejandro Amenábar	2	5
Rodrigo Sorogoyen	2	3
Vicente Aranda	1	6
Icíar Bollaín	1	5
Alberto Rodríguez	1	5
José Luis Garci	1	4
Álex de la Iglesia	1	4
Pilar Miró	1	3
Imanol Uribe	1	3
David Trueba	1	3
Fernando Fernán Gómez	1	2
Ricardo Franco	1	2
Carlos Saura	1	2
Agustí Villaronga	1	2
Daniel Monzón	1	2
Cesc Gay	1	2
Javier Fesser	1	2
Isaki Lacuesta	1	2
Aitor Arregi	0	4
Jon Garaño	0	4
Montxo Armendáriz	0	3
Agustín Díaz Yanes	0	3
Emilio Martínez Lázaro	0	3
Gracia Querejeta	0	3
Benito Zambrano	0	3
Manuel Martín Cuenca	0	3
Adolfo Aristarain	0	2
José Luis Cuerda	0	2
Bigas Luna	0	2
Julio Medem	0	2
Juanma Bajo Ulloa	0	2
Carlos Vermut	0	2
Paula Ortiz	0	2
Carla Simón	0	2
Oliver Laxe	0	2
