= Loreak =

- Theatrical release poster
- Loreak (Flowers)
- Directed by: Jon Garaño; Jose Mari Goenaga
- Written by: Jon Garaño; Aitor Arregi; Jose Mari Goenaga
- Produced by: Xabier Berzosa
- Starring: Itziar Ituño; Nagore Aranburu; Itziar Aizpuru; Josean Bengoetxea
- Cinematography: Javi Agirre Erauso
- Edited by: Raúl López
- Music by: Pascal Gaigne
- Production companies: Irusoin; Moriarti Produkzioak; EITB; TVE
- Distributed by: A Contracorrientefilms (Spain); Music Box Films (United States); Film Factory Entertainment (International)
- Release date: October 31, 2014 (Spain)
- Running time: 99 minutes
- Country: Spain
- Language: Basque

Loreak, released in the US as Flowers, is a 2014 Basque-language Spanish drama film directed by Jon Garaño and Jose Mari Goenaga.

It premiered in the Official Section of the 2014 San Sebastián International Film Festival, and was also screened at the 2014 BFI London Film Festival, the 2014 Zurich Film Festival, the 2014 Tokyo International Film Festival and the 2015 Palm Springs International Film Festival.

It became the first Basque language film nominated for the Goya Award for Best Film. It was selected as the Spanish entry for the Best Foreign Language Film at the 88th Academy Awards, being the first Basque language film to do it, but was not nominated.

== Plot ==
Ane is a construction supervisor in her early forties who is frustrated with her life after entering menopause. One day, she starts to receive bouquets of flowers at home anonymously, once a week. While she is uplifted by the deliveries, this causes tension with her husband Ander. While searching for her wedding chain at a construction site, she is watched by the crane operator, Beñat, who keeps the chain inside his compartment, revealing him to be the anonymous flower-sender.

Beñat lives with his wife, Lourdes, and stepson Mikel. Lourdes, a tollbooth operator, has a tense relationship with her elderly mother-in-law, Tere, whom she perceives is excessively interfering in their lives. After Tere rearranges their apartment, Lourdes complains to Beñat, who then argues with his mother. After Tere abruptly hangs up on her son, Beñat crashes his car into a fenced curve during a storm and dies. His body is sent to a university to be used for medical purposes for five years, in accordance with his wishes. A distraught Lourdes cuts off all contact with Tere.

During a search of Beñat's belongings, Ane's chain is discovered and returned to her. Realizing the truth, Ane resolves to hitchhike to the site of his crash to bring flowers, which she does weekly for the next three years. The deliveries intrigue Tere, who initially assumes it was Lourdes who sent them until she denies it. Lourdes is also intrigued after learning that no other accidents occurred on the crash site apart from Beñat's. Tere leaves a note on a wilted bouquet at the crash site that Ane replaces and gives out her contact details. Ane meets with her and both take a liking to each other. Lourdes, who is still embittered by Beñat's death and suspecting an extramarital affair, tracks down Ane under the guise of taking her for a lift to the crash site. After confirming that Ane is the one sending flowers to Beñat and learning about her story, she confronts Ane in her car before accidentally running over a sheep. As Lourdes goes out to inspect, Ane escapes.

Two more years pass and the lease on Beñat's body expires. Lourdes is summoned to reclaim Beñat's ashes. Unsure of what to do, Lourdes tries to send them to Tere, only to find that she is suffering from dementia and can no longer remember her son. She then tries to send them to Ane, who tells her that she has moved on from Beñat's death and stopped sending flowers at the crash site, and explains that her infatuation was part of her coping mechanism during that time before asking Lourdes why she wants to get rid of the ashes. Lourdes finally decides to wrap Beñat's urn under a bouquet and leave it at the crash site.

== Cast ==
- Nagore Aranburu as Ane
- Itziar Ituño as Lourdes
- Itziar Aizpuru as Tere
- Josean Bengoetxea as Beñat
- Egoitz Lasa as Ander
- Ane Gabarain as Jaione
- José Ramón Soroiz as Txema
- Jox Berasategi as Jexus

== Reception ==
=== Critical reception ===
Loreak was met with positive reviews by critics. Loreak has an approval rating of 77% on review aggregator website Rotten Tomatoes, based on 26 reviews, and an average rating of 7.1/10. The website's critical consensus states: "Directors Jon Garaño and Jose Mari Goenaga have crafted an intimate and beautifully filmed drama about loss and healing, though it occasionally suffers from a slow pace". Metacritic assigned the film a weighted average score of 63 out of 100, based on 13 critics, indicating "generally favorable reviews".

Jonathan Holland of The Hollywood Reporter praised it for being "as beguiling and beautifully structured as the flowers of its title" and said it "absolutely deserves wider exposure". Jay Weissberg of Variety called the film "beautifully cast" and "an affecting story of loss and the ways people cope". Lluís Bonet Mojica of La Vanguardia, who gave Loreak a five-star review, noted that it is a "film where nothing happens and everything happens". Oti Rodríguez Marchante of ABC described the film as a "moving and delicate melodrama". On the mixed side, Andrea G. Bermejo of Cinemanía gave Loreak 3.5 stars out of five and observed that "by means of so much perfection [...] the result loses some spontaneity, some audacity, and perhaps, some weight".

=== Awards and nominations ===
Awards	Category	Nominated	Result
62nd San Sebastián International Film Festival	Golden Shell for Best Film		Nominated
62nd San Sebastián International Film Festival	SIGNIS Award, Special Mention		Won
2015 Palm Springs International Film Festival	Cine Latino Award		Won
Premis Sant Jordi de Cinematografia 2015	Best Spanish Film		Won
II Premios Feroz	Best Drama		Nominated
II Premios Feroz	Best Director	Jon Garaño and Jose Mari Goenaga	Nominated
II Premios Feroz	Best Screenplay	Jon Garaño, Aitor Arregi and Jose Mari Goenaga	Nominated
II Premios Feroz	Best Supporting Actress	Itziar Aizpuru	Won
II Premios Feroz	Best Original Soundtrack	Pascal Gaigne	Nominated
II Premios Feroz	Best Film Poster		Nominated
29th Goya Awards	Best Film		Nominated
29th Goya Awards	Best Original Score	Pascal Gaigne	Nominated

== See also ==
- List of submissions to the 88th Academy Awards for Best Foreign Language Film
- List of Spanish submissions for the Academy Award for Best Foreign Language Film
