= Jon Garaño =

Spanish film director and screenwriter (born 1974)

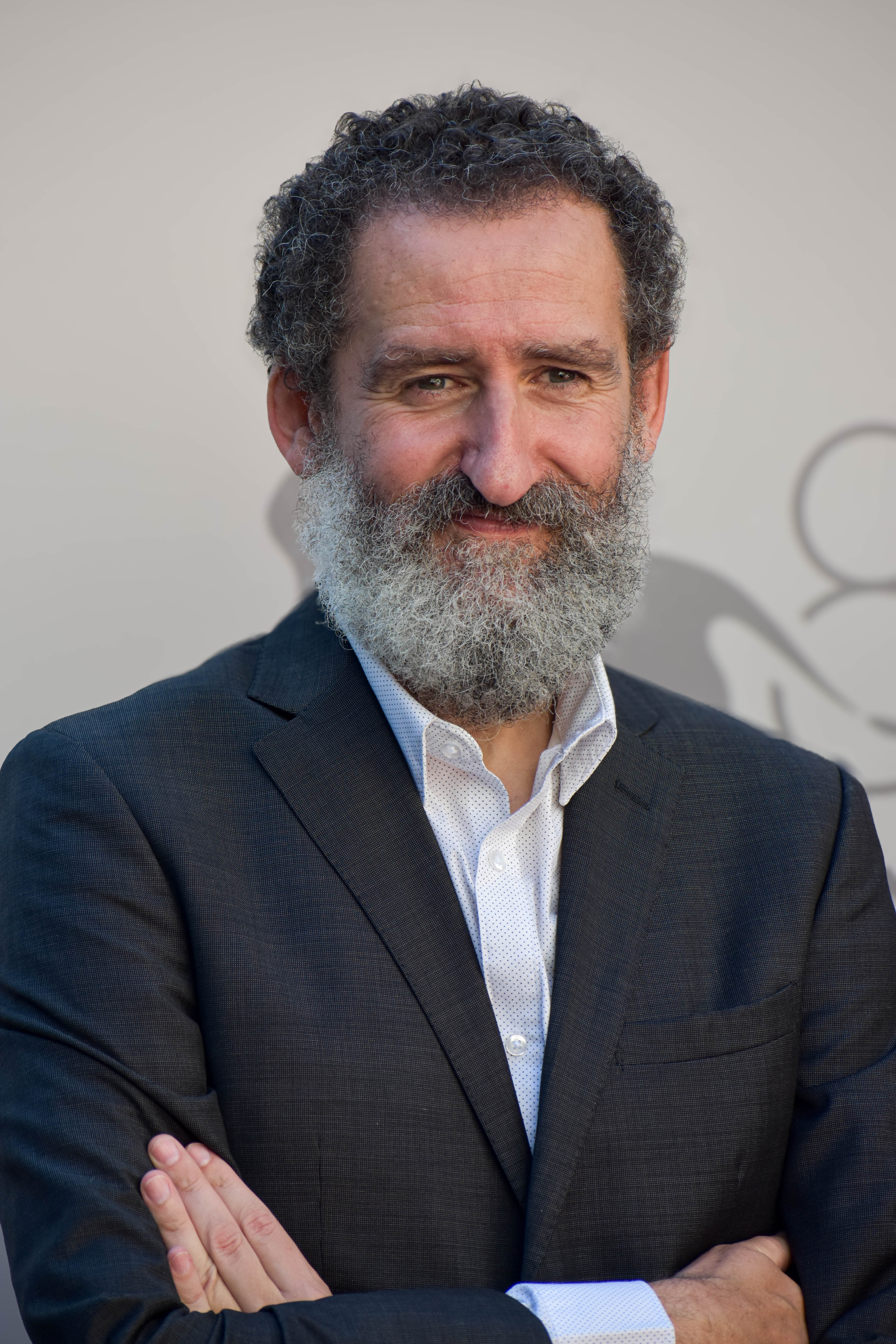
- Garaño in 2024
- Born: 18 November 1974 (age 51); Astigarraga, Basque Country, Spain
- Occupations: Filmmaker; Screenwriter

Jon Garaño Arzalus (born 18 November 1974) is a Spanish Basque filmmaker and screenwriter. He won the Goya Award for Best Original Screenplay for the 2017 film Giant and has been nominated for the Goya Award for Best Director three times, for Giant, The Endless Trench (2019) and Marco, the Invented Truth (2024).

== Biography ==
Garaño graduated in journalism and advertising at the University of the Basque Country and studied film at the Sarobe Centro de Artes Escénicas and San Diego State University.

In 2001, Arregi started the film production company Moriarti Produkzioak with other colleagues. The productions of Moriarti Produkzioak are characterised by teamwork, including directing, and by the exchange of roles between the members.

== Filmography ==
Year	Title	Role	Notes
2001	Despedida	Director	Short film Directed by Jon Garaño & Lucas Blanco
2004	Sahara Marathon	Director, Screenwriter	Directed by Aitor Arregi & Jon Garaño
2005	The Dragon House	Director, Screenwriter	
2006	Miramar Street	Director, Screenwriter	
2008	FGM	Director, Screenwriter	Short film
2008	On the Line	Director, Screenwriter	Short film
2009	Asamära	Director, Screenwriter	Short film Directed by Jon Garaño & Raúl López
2010	Perurena	Director, Screenwriter	Medium-length film
2010	La casa del nazareno	Director, Screenwriter	Short film
2010	For 80 Days	Director, Screenwriter	Directed by Jon Garaño & Jose Mari Goenaga; 58th San Sebastián International Film Festival - Sebastiane Award
2010	El método Julio	Director, Screenwriter	Short film
2011	Urrezko eraztuna	Director	Short film
2014	Loreak (US title: Flowers)	Director, Screenwriter	Directed by Jon Garaño and Jose Mari Goenaga; 62nd San Sebastián International Film Festival - SIGNIS Award, Special Mention; Nominated - 62nd San Sebastián International Film Festival - Golden Shell
2016	Renovable	Director	Short film Directed by Jon Garaño & Jose Mari Goenaga
2017	Giant	Director, Screenwriter	Directed by Jon Garaño & Aitor Arregi; Goya Award for Best Original Screenplay; 65th San Sebastián International Film Festival - Special Jury Prize; Nominated - Goya Award for Best Director; Nominated - 65th San Sebastián International Film Festival - Golden Shell
2019	The Endless Trench	Director	Directed by Jon Garaño, Aitor Arregi & Jose Mari Goenaga; 67th San Sebastián International Film Festival - Silver Shell for Best Director; Nominated - Goya Award for Best Director; Nominated - 67th San Sebastián International Film Festival - Golden Shell
2024	Cristóbal Balenciaga	Creator, Director, Screenwriter	Television miniseries Directed by Jon Garaño, Aitor Arregi & Jose Mari Goenaga
2024	Marco, the Invented Truth	Director, Screenwriter	Directed by Jon Garaño & Aitor Arregi; Nominated - Goya Award for Best Director; Nominated - 81st Venice International Film Festival - Orizzonti Award
