= Aitor Arregi Galdos =

Spanish film director and screenwriter (born 1977)

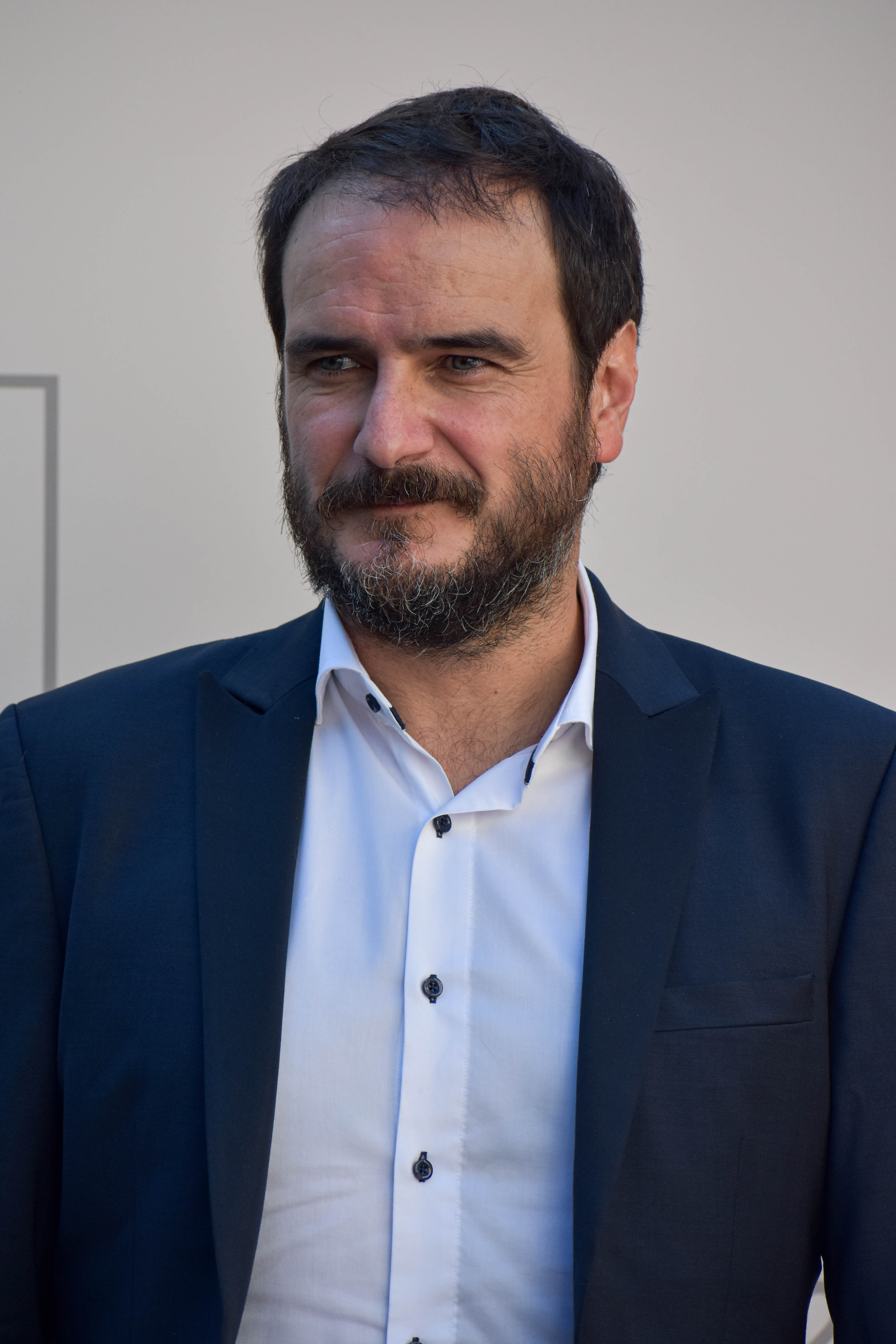
- Arregi at the 81st Venice International Film Festival (2024)
- Born: 20 May 1977 (age 49); Oñati, Basque Country, Spain
- Education: Mondragon University (BBA)
- Occupations: Filmmaker; Screenwriter
- Years active: 2002–present

Aitor Arregi Galdos (born 20 May 1977) is a Spaniard Basque filmmaker and screenwriter. He won the Goya Award for Best Original Screenplay for the 2017 film Giant and has been nominated for the Goya Award for Best Director three times, for Giant, The Endless Trench (2019) and Marco, the Invented Truth (2024).

== Biography ==
Arregi was born in the Basque town of Oñati. After graduating in Business Administration from Mondragon University, he studied filmmaking at the Sarobe Centro de Artes Escénicas.

In 2002, Arregi started the film production company Moriarti Produkzioak together with Asier Acha, Xabier Berzosa, Jon Garaño, Jorge Gil, and Jose Maria Goenaga. The company is based in Pasaia. The productions of Moriarti Produkzioak are characterised by teamwork, including directing, and by the exchange of roles between the members.

Since 2008, Arregi has also been a lecturer in audiovisual communication at Mondragon University.

== Filmography ==
Year	Title	Role	Notes
2004	Sahara Marathon	Director, Screenwriter	Directed by Aitor Arregi & Jon Garaño
2004	Glup, una aventura sin desperdicio	Director	Directed by Aitor Arregi & Iñigo Berasategi
2006	Cristobal Molón	Director	Directed by Aitor Arregi & Iñigo Berasategi
2007	Lucio	Director, Screenwriter	Directed by Aitor Arregi & Jose Mari Goenaga
2014	She Bought It in Zarautz	Director, Screenwriter	Short film Directed by Aitor Arregi
2014	Loreak	Screenwriter	Directed by Jon Garaño and Jose Mari Goenaga
2017	Giant	Director, Screenwriter	Directed by Aitor Arregi & Jon Garaño; Goya Award for Best Original Screenplay; 65th San Sebastián International Film Festival - Special Jury Prize; Nominated - Goya Award for Best Director; Nominated - 65th San Sebastián International Film Festival - Golden Shell
2019	The Endless Trench	Director	Directed by Aitor Arregi, Jon Garaño & Jose Mari Goenaga; 67th San Sebastián International Film Festival - Silver Shell for Best Director; Nominated - Goya Award for Best Director; Nominated - 67th San Sebastián International Film Festival - Golden Shell
2024	Cristóbal Balenciaga	Creator, Director, Screenwriter	Television miniseries Directed by Aitor Arregi, Jon Garaño & Jose Mari Goenaga
2024	Marco, the Invented Truth	Director, Screenwriter	Directed by Aitor Arregi & Jon Garaño; Nominated - Goya Award for Best Director; Nominated - 81st Venice International Film Festival - Orizzonti Award
