= La bola negra =

2026 film by Javier Calvo and Javier Ambrossi

- Spanish theatrical release poster
- Spanish: La bola negra
- Directed by: Javier Calvo; Javier Ambrossi
- Screenplay by: Javier Ambrossi; Javier Calvo; Alberto Conejero
- Based on: La bola negra by Federico García Lorca; La piedra oscura by Alberto Conejero
- Produced by: Javier Calvo; Javier Ambrossi
- Starring: Guitarricadelafuente; Miguel Bernardeau; Carlos González; Milo Quifes; Lola Dueñas; Penélope Cruz; Glenn Close
- Cinematography: Gris Jordana
- Edited by: Alberto Gutiérrez
- Music by: Raül Refree
- Production companies: Suma Content Films; Telefónica Audiovisual Digital; Los Esquiadores AIE; El Deseo; Le Pacte
- Distributed by: Elastica (Spain); Le Pacte (France)
- Release dates: 21 May 2026 (Cannes); 25 September 2026 (Spain); 16 December 2026 (France)
- Running time: 159 minutes
- Countries: Spain; France
- Language: Spanish
- Budget: €15 million
- Box office: €39.7 million (Spain); $50 million (worldwide)

La bola negra, also known as The Black Ball, is a 2026 drama film directed by Javier Calvo and Javier Ambrossi, from a screenplay they co-wrote with Alberto Conejero. A queer epic inspired by the incomplete work by Federico García Lorca and Conejero's play La piedra oscura, the story hops between 1932, 1937, and 2017 to explore the connections between three gay men and Lorca's body of work. It stars Guitarricadelafuente, Miguel Bernardeau, Carlos González, Milo Quifes, Lola Dueñas, Penélope Cruz, and Glenn Close.

A Movistar Plus original produced alongside Suma Content, El Deseo and Le Pacte, the film premiered in the main competition of the 79th Cannes Film Festival on 21 May 2026, earning Calvo and Ambrossi the Best Director Award. The festival run continued with screenings at Toronto and San Sebastián ahead of the 25 September 2026 theatrical release in Spain by Elastica. The French release by Le Pacte is set for 16 December 2026.

La bola negra was selected as the Spanish entry for Best International Feature Film at the 99th Academy Awards. It scored a strong box office performance domestically in Spain, becoming the eighth highest grossing film in the country, the third highest grossing local film, the film with the highest number of tickets sold in 2026, and the highest-grossing film distributed by Elastica.

== Plot ==
In 1932 Granada, Carlos, a young man from a wealthy family, is refused membership of an exclusive social club after its members vote against his admission using a blackball ballot because of rumours about his homosexuality. His father, Vicente, urges him to deny the rumours and seek admission again. His sister, Valentina, describes the restrictions she faces as a woman, while his mother suggests that he leave for Madrid. In a club at night, Carlos dances to a seguiriya and encounters a mourning elderly woman who identifies him as her missing son, but Carlos flees afterwards.

Carlos appeals to the club's committee and, when questioned, denies being homosexual. In the wake of the botched Sanjurjada, the Casino is stormed by a mob. After the building is destroyed and covered in snow, Carlos escapes using the painters' scaffolding and walks up a snowy mountain, where he encounters a boy with a young woman and a group of skiers and is addressed by the personified Snow, whose voice is that of the elderly woman he met earlier. Realising he has died and wasted his life living in secret, Carlos begs the voice to return to the world of the living, to no avail.

In 1937, during the Spanish Civil War, Sebastián, a young village trumpeter, survives an attack by Italian aircraft on a community preparing to welcome them. His mother is killed. After fleeing the attack, he is forced to join the Nationalist forces to survive. In Santander, he is assigned to guard Rafael Rodríguez Rapún, a wounded Republican prisoner of war, and obtain information from him. Rafael had belonged to Federico García Lorca's theatre company, La Barraca, and had been the poet's lover. As Sebastián gets to know Rafael, his homosexual desire is aroused, bonding closer with him as Rafael introduces Sebastián to Lorca's poetry.

Nené Romero, a popular cupletista entertaining the troops, acquaints herself with Sebastián and introduces him to queer role models such as Edmond de Bries. As a last request Rafael asks Sebastián to recover a manuscript of Lorca's play La bola negra from an apartment in Alcalá 96 and preserve it. Rafael is taken with other prisoners for a summary execution (paseo), and Sebastián is placed in the firing squad, killing Rafael. In 1939, Sebastián survives the war and retrieves the manuscript, although dropping a few of the pages on the floor.

In 2017, Alberto López Azcuna, a historian and former playwright, is researching queer dissidence in the music of Rosa Eskenazi while visiting Athens. His estranged maternal grandfather dies and leaves him an inheritance should he meet a lawyer in Cantabria. In Madrid, Alberto lives with his boyfriend, Juan Pablo. Alberto struggles to communicate with his mother, Teresa, who resents her father's abandonment of her. Teresa urges Alberto not to travel to Cantabria and intends to sell the house she inherited. Alberto's part of the inheritance turns out to be the remaining manuscript of La bola negra, believed to have been left unfinished by Lorca. Carlos is revealed as La bola negra's protagonist, the first explicitly gay character in Lorca's work. Alberto investigates the origins of the play and seeks the help of Lorca scholar Isabelle Durand.

Alberto's grandfather is revealed to be Sebastián, who went on to live in the countryside with another man while allowing the villagers to believe that they were cousins. Although estranged from his family, Sebastián had followed Alberto's theatrical career from a distance, attending a performance and keeping press cuttings. Alberto meets his grandfather's surviving partner, who tells him that Sebastián would have been proud of him. Isabelle corroborates the manuscript's authenticity, and Alberto and Teresa opt against selling Sebastián's house as they begin to reconcile.

== Cast ==
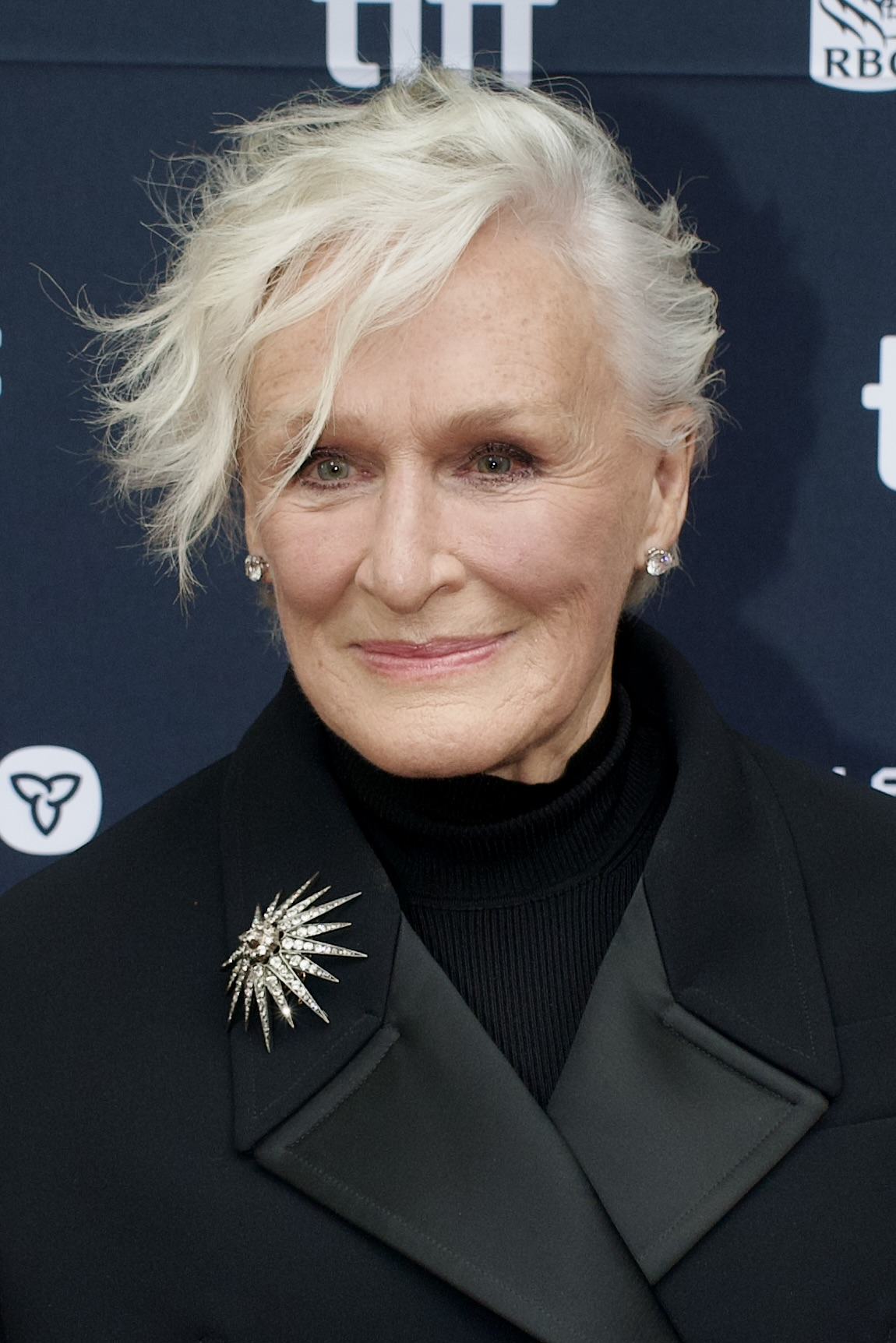
Select cast from left to right: Guitarricadelafuente, Miguel Bernardeau, Carlos González, Milo Quifes, Lola Dueñas, Penélope Cruz, Glenn Close, Yenesi, Julio Torres, Natalia de Molina, Hugo Welzel, and Mona Martínez
- Guitarricadelafuente as Sebastián
- Miguel Bernardeau as Rafael Rodríguez Rapún
- Carlos González as Alberto
- Milo Quifes as Carlos
- Lola Dueñas as Teresa
- Penélope Cruz as Nené Romero
- Glenn Close as Isabelle Durand
- Antonio de la Torre as Vicente, Carlos' father
- Lorenzo Zurzolo as Riccardo
- Albert Pla as Pascual
- Yenesi as Goyita
- Julio Torres as Juan Pablo
- Natalia de Molina as Valentina, Carlos' sister
- Hugo Welzel as Enrique
- María Morales as madre de Carlos ('Carlos' mother')
- Mona Martínez as la anciana / la nieve ('the old woman' / 'the snow')
- Nuria Mencía as Lucía
- Alberto Cortés as Federico García Lorca
- Javier Butler es Alejandro Chaves
- Mateo Medina es Ximo
- Teo Lucadamo es Frasquito
- Valentín Martínez es Arnal
- Juan Vergara es Mariano
- Gio Martínez es Lupo
- Joaquín Ruíz es Bosco

Lola Rodríguez, Judeline, Alana Portero, María Barrier, Álex Pastrana, Daniel Ibáñez, Antonio Dechent, Sabina Urraca, Claudia Costafreda, Sara Torres, Álex de Lucas, El Bugg, María Bernardeau, Leo Encinas Cruz, Mabel Olea, Palomo Spain, and Custodio Pastor make cameo appearances.

== Production ==
=== Development ===
The plot is inspired by La bola negra, an incomplete work by Federico García Lorca of which 4 pages are preserved, with the title ('the black ball') alluding to the form of rejection to a young gay man when attempting to join a social club in Granada. In addition to the few surviving pages of La bola negra, the 1932 timeline taps from Lorca's recollection of the events of the Sanjurjada of 1932 in Granada and, above all, of the fire at the casino of Granada on 10 August 1932, an event directly witnessed by Lorca. The plot also draws by the play La piedra oscura ('the dark stone') by Alberto Conejero, which contributes mostly to the 1937 timeline featuring Sebastián and Rafael Rodríguez Rapún. The 2017 timeline taps to an extent from Conejero's life and, as per Conejero's statements, it is no coincidence that the leading character, a writer and playwright, is named Alberto and is writing a dissertation on Greek literature. While in the early stages of development, Calvo and Ambrossi (collectively known as 'Los Javis') declined to confirm whether García Lorca would appear as a character in the film. The film pays homage to Irish-born hispanist and Lorca biographer Ian Gibson by mirroring his family background to that of Glenn Close's character.

Main cast members Guitarricadelafuente (in his acting debut), Carlos González, Miguel Bernardeau, Lola Dueñas, and Penélope Cruz were announced by Los Javis during the 2025 Cannes Film Festival. Ambrossi retrospectively recalled that he envisioned Héctor Bellerín as his preliminary choice for Bernardeau's role while the project was in the earliest stages of development. La bola negra is a Movistar Plus+ and Suma Content Films co-production with El Deseo and Le Pacte, and it had the participation of Atresmedia. Other cast members such as Milo Quifes (in his acting debut), Lorenzo Zurzolo, Albert Pla, Yenesi Suárez, Mona Martínez, Hugo Welzel, María Morales, Daniel Ibáñez, and Nuria Mencía were announced while shooting was taking place.

Eva Leira and Yolanda Serrano worked as casting directors.

=== Filming ===
The village of Lafuente served as shooting location

On 26 August 2025, local media reported the beginning of filming in the abandoned village of Castil de Carrias, halfway between Belorado and Briviesca. Shooting also took place in Comillas (where a man working as an extra fell down some stairs on set and eventually died), Lafuente, Granada (Iglesia de Santa Ana, Carmen de los Mártires, Albaicín), Sierra Nevada, and Sigüenza. Athens and Madrid were also shooting locations. The production had a budget of around €15 million.

Cinematographer Gris Jordana shot the movie on 35mm film. She used two Arricam LT cameras and Panavision Primo lenses. She explained that it was decided "not to make any distinctions regarding processing, color correction, or exposure across the three storylines", choosing instead to differentiate the periods through "audiovisual language, mise-en-scène, and camera movement".

Roger Bellés, a recurring collaborator with Los Javis since Holy Camp!, was the art director. Prior to seeing the result in scene, he was worried about criticism for the colossal size of the statue of Saint Sebastian that Sebastián climbs up in the film. While looking for locations to stand in for Nené's theatre, the crew found a venue in Sigüenza that had been closed for fifty years that was subsequently restored. Regarding the set design of the Casino of Granada, a non-realist style was pursued as well as nods to stage, finding inspiration in Joaquín Sorolla's paintings of Granada and how a hypothetical set design by La Barraca for the story would look like. The design of the family house depicted in the 1932 storyline was a close recreation of the Huerta de San Vicente, the summer house owned by García Lorca's family.

Ana López-Cobos took over costume design. To prepare for the looks of the cupletista Nené portrayed by Penélope Cruz, the team took inspiration from images of Raquel Meller, La Fornarina, and Tórtola Valencia. In order to prepare for the role, Cruz took inspiration from Olga Ramos and rehearsed with help from her daughter Olga María. For the 2017 timeline, López-Cobos looked to Matthias & Maxime for inspiration, dressing Dueñas in the vein of the working-class moms appearing in Xavier Dolan's films.

Calvo and Ambrossi ended their 13-year relationship during the shooting. According to sources consulted by El País, the separation was not going to disrupt ongoing and future professional projects by Los Javis, including the rest of this shooting.

=== Post-production ===
Alberto Gutiérrez, a regular collaborator of Los Javis, edited the film. He faced a tight schedule to finish the film in between the shooting of a pivotal snow scene on location in February 2026 and the March 2026 deadline for the Cannes submission. Originally, the running time of La bola negra was over four and a half hours, and much footage had to be left out. The ICAA-reported runtime of the theatrical cut is 159 minutes.

== Music ==
Raül Refree, who had already collaborated with Los Javis in La mesías, scored the film. Lead actor Guitarricadelafuente performed (and co-wrote along with Refree) the tune "La nieve" ('the snow'), that features in a pivotal scene late in the film. Judeline (who also debuted as an actress in the film) performed a version of "Soldadito español" ('little Spanish soldier') for the film's score. Originally conceived in 1927 during the dictatorship of Primo de Rivera as a militarist pasodoble, the version of Judeline elicited a public controversy in regard of the limits of its purported resignification in the film as an anti-war song. The trailer features an arrangement by Refree and Pablo Lluch reinterpreting Camarón de la Isla's "La leyenda del tiempo", which in turn sets to music a poem by García Lorca. María Terremoto provides vocals for a seguiriya, whilst Penélope Cruz does so for two cuplés ("Las tardes del Ritz" and "Batallón de modistillas").

The original soundtrack featuring 24 songs was published under Lakeshore Records on 16 October 2026.

"Soldadito español" and "La leyenda del tiempo" were made available about a month later by public demand in a 'deluxe' edition of the soundtrack. Other songs beyond the original soundtrack featuring in the film include "Ginomai Andras" and "Giati Foumaro Kokaini" by Roza Eskenazi, "La hija de Juan Simón" by Angelillo, "Hello" by Martin Solveig & Dragonette, "Tubthumping" by Chumbawamba, "Las castigadoras, schotis" by Orquesta Betoré, and "Mi querer es como el hierro" and "Danza (Acto II) de la ópera La vida breve" by Manuel de Falla.

== Release ==
Bernardeau, Guitarricadelafuente, Quifes and González attending the 2026 TIFF Tribute Awards

The film had its world premiere at the 79th Cannes Film Festival on 21 May 2026. For its Australian premiere, the film made it to the lineup of the 73rd Sydney Film Festival. For its Spanish premiere, it was programmed in the 'Perlak' slate of the 74th San Sebastián International Film Festival. For its Canadian premiere, it made it to the 'Special Presentations' slate of the 2026 Toronto International Film Festival. It was also programmed at the New Horizons Film Festival, the New Zealand International Film Festival, the 74th Melbourne International Film Festival, the 53rd Telluride Film Festival (for its North American premiere), the 39th Out on Film festival, the 28th Rio de Janeiro International Film Festival, the 39th Helsinki International Film Festival – Love & Anarchy, the 22nd Zurich Film Festival, the 70th BFI London Film Festival, the 24th Morelia International Film Festival, the 'World Focus Selection' of the 39th Tokyo International Film Festival, the 21st Rome Film Festival, and the 41st Mar del Plata International Film Festival.

Goodfellas took over international sales. Elastica handled theatrical distribution in Spain. The release in Spanish theatres was originally scheduled for 2 October 2026, but was later brought forward to 25 September 2026. The launch was Elastica's largest one to date. Co-producer Le Pacte is scheduled to release the film in French theatres on 16 December 2026. Likewise, Nitrato Filmes scheduled a 5 November 2026 theatrical rollout in Portugal, Altitude programmed a 6 November 2026 theatrical release in the United Kingdom and Ireland, Pandora Film a 19 November theatrical release in Germany, and Movies Inspired a 14 January 2027 theatrical release in Italy.

Also in Europe, Goodfellas closed distribution deals with Cinéart (for the Benelux), Filmcoopi (Switzerland), Pandora Film (Austria), Rosebud (Greece), Another World (Scandinavia), Cinelibri (Bulgaria), MCF (former Yugoslavia), Mozinet (Hungary), Aero Films (Czechia), Independenta (Romania), A-One Films (the Baltic countries), and Gutek Film (Poland).

Shortly after its Cannes premiere, a bidding war ensued for U.S. distribution rights to the film, with A24, Netflix, Mubi, and Neon believed to be among the interested companies. Netflix ultimately won in a deal worth around $4–5 million, with a multi-week theatrical release obligation and plans for an awards campaign. Netflix subsequently set a 4-week theatrical window starting on 6 November 2026 before the film's U.S. streaming debut on 4 December 2026. It later announced that the theatrical release date (then also reported to involve the Canadian market in addition to the U.S.) would be moved up to 16 October 2026. Its streaming release date was also brought up to 2 December, thus giving the film a 47-day theatrical window, the longest for a Netflix film, breaking Marriage Story's record.

Most of the theatrical openings in Latin American territories were set for January 2027. The Brazilian theatrical release date under Paris Filmes was set for 21 January 2027. Zima Entertainment secured theatrical distribution in Mexico. Other Latin American releases include a 14 January 2027 Colombian release by Cinecolor.

Goodefellas also closed deals in Australia and New Zealand (Rialto Distribution), Japan (Transformer), South Korea (Challan), Taiwan (ifilm), Hong Kong (Edko Films), Israel (New Cinemas), India (Impact Films), Thailand (Sahamongkol), Singapore (Anticipate Pictures), and the Philippines (FDCP).

== Reception ==
=== Box office ===
==== Domestic ====
Positive pre-sales figures were reported for the film, tracking 34% behind Torrente for President and 40% ahead of The Odyssey ahead of the 25 September 2026 theatrical rollout in Spain.

On its opening Friday, it obtained a revenue of around €1.32 million (175,000 admissions), nominally the second highest-grossing opening day for a Spanish release in the last ten years after Torrente for President. It went on to gross around €4.67 million in its opening weekend, nominally the ninth highest-grossing debut for a Spanish film and the highest grossing debut under a local distributor. It also had the highest-grossing Tuesday for a Spanish film on 29 September, coinciding with the so-called martes sénior package with a fixed €2 admission fee on Tuesdays for people 65 and older. It attained a €9.1 million gross and 1.3 million admissions before completing its first week in theatres. The revenue in the second weekend experienced a 20% increase up to €5.9 million, for an accumulated gross of €14.9 million (and over 2 million admissions). It quickly became Elastica Films' largest box office haul in its history, surpassing Backrooms.

A combination of strong reviews and word of mouth plus FOMO effect was used to explain the film's positive box office performance. It added €4.9 million on its third weekend to a total gross over €23.5 million (3.7 million admissions). It arrived into its third Friday with a gross of around €26.7 million. It completed its fourth weekend with a €29.5 million accumulated gross. Upon completing its fifth weekend with a '-31%' drop, it had an accumulated gross of €34.3 million and over 5 million admissions. It also become the third highest grossing Spanish-produced release (and eighth overall) ever in the domestic box office, ending its sixth weekend with a €36.7 million accumulated gross, and more than 5.5 million admissions, thus becoming the 2026 film with more tickets sold, surpassing Spider-Man: Brand New Day. After the seventh weekend, with €38.52 million, it became the second highest grossing film in 2026, surpassing The Odyssey. The film had a run of 47 consecutive days topping the box office before being ousted by Pray for Us. It subsequently left the top place in the box office in favour of Ebenezer in its eight weekend, adding €0.675 million to a €39.7 million cume.

==== International ====
As of 22 November 2026, the American box office tracking website Box Office Mojo reports a $50 million worldwide gross.

The film made $277,500 in its U.S. opening weekend in 4 theatres of Los Angeles and New York. Following a limited expansion to nine theaters, it added $0.245 million in its second weekend for an accumulated gross of $0.650 million. It added $0.418 million from 38 theatres to an accumulated gross of $1.2 million in its third weekend of its limited North American release. For its fourth weekend, it expanded to 473 theatres, adding $0.975 million for an accumulated gross of $2.47 million.

The film had the biggest debut ever for a Spanish-language film in the United Kingdom and Ireland box office, grossing £536,000 in its opening weekend. Opening in 59 screens, it debuted second in the Portuguese box office.

=== Critical response ===
On the review aggregator website Rotten Tomatoes, 87% of 167 critics' reviews are positive, with an average rating of 8.3/10. The website's consensus reads: "An intergenerational epic bathed in striking imagery and vibrant music, La Bola Negra is a sensorial feast that movingly testifies to the perseverance of queer identity throughout history." Metacritic, which uses a weighted average, assigned the film a score of 77 out of 100, based on 41 critics, indicating "generally favorable" reviews.

Sophie Monks Kaufman of IndieWire gave the film an 'A' rating, wondering about the near impossibility of grasping "the structural effort required to fluidly create one perfectly coherent story using three narratives told across three timelines, each with a distinct visual identity". Peter Bradshaw of The Guardian, rated the "rich and rewarding" movie 4 out of 5 stars, deeming it to be "handsomely produced, lovingly detailed and confidently constructed". Richard Lawson of The Hollywood Reporter underscored the film as "a dazzling mix of contemporary pop sensibility and classical filmmaking". Zachary Lee of TheWrap billed La bola negra as "one of those rare films that feels both old and new", while Douglas Greenwood of i-D commended it as "grandiose historical epic". Siddhant Adlakha of Observer rated the film 4 out of 4 stars, commending it as a "magnificently moving triptych that feels at once novel and like a classically staged military epic".

In a 5-star rating, Luis Martínez of El Mundo wrote that what the film brings to the table is, first and foremost, "a jolt of baroque, melodramatic emotion which, in its overwhelming intensity, appears proud and joyful even in its mistakes". Mariona Borrull of Fotogramas rated the film 4 out of 5 stars, declaring it "a sweeping two-and-a-half-hour epic", while considering the third act to be "heavy-going or overly didactic, verging on the corny". Elisabet Cabeza of Sight and Sound considered that the film's strengths lie "in the emotional excess of classic melodrama to honour the past and its victims". Giving the film a 4-star review, Nando Salvà of El Periódico de Catalunya considered the film to be "as excessive as it is imposing and crushing", assessing that it ends up earning the right to remain firmly rooted in narrative, stylistic and emotional maximalism.

Elsa Fernández-Santos of El País deemed La bola negra to be "a moving and ambitious search of the Spanish queer identity", despite some excesses, otherwise featuring a stunning Penélope Cruz in a brilliant scene pumping up the troops. Guy Lodge of Variety reproved that while the ambitious film "occasionally strikes a poetic note worthy of its historical muse, it more often plays as turgidly overblown melodrama". Lee Marshall of ScreenDaily described the film as a "stirring, timely reclamation of Spain's history and queer culture" but also as "a sprawling, undisciplined melodrama", otherwise being "more effective as an earnest, cumulative emotional journey than as a viewing experience". Davide Abbatescianni of Cineuropa assessed that the film "proves rewarding and often moving, even if it occasionally struggles under the weight of its own scale". Daniel de Partearroyo of Cinemanía rated the film 3 out of 5 stars, lamenting that it "is overwhelmed by an ambition with no way out", adding that "the soil [the film] is turning over has already been worked extensively, and its plough is not sharp enough to cut any deeper". Justin Chang of The New Yorker drew blood in his review, decrying how the film "is no monument. It's a bust."

Carlos Boyero surprised with an enthusiastic opinion about the film. Reviewing for El País, he considered that "almost everything in this movie rings true. But above all, it has atmosphere and emotion", concluding that "it is not perfect, but there is something touching about it". Brian Tallerico of RogerEbert.com rated the film 4 out of 4 stars, praising the heartfelt language "that unites based on feelings like longing, acceptance, and dignity" as well as the "stunning" qualities of the film on a craft level. In a 2-star rating, Manuel J. Lombardo of Diario de Sevilla reprimanded that the emotional crescendo never comes "because of the accumulation and excess of poetic pornography, engrossed in its own grandiloquence". Giving the film a 2 out of 4 stars rating, Ed Gonzalez of Slant found very disappointing that "the borders between the three timelines aren't more porous". In a 5-star rating, Clotilde Chinnici of FilmHounds lauded the "beautiful story, heart, and acting performances". Robbie Collin of The Telegraph rated the film 4 out of 5 stars, assessing that "it feels like three films for the price of one, but crucially also one coherent film – the work of directors who aren't hanging around". Wendy Ide of The Observer considered the queer, multistranded Spanish epic to be "ambitious, audacious, sweeping in its scope and intricate in structure", otherwise praising the use of sound and the ravishing 35mm cinematography.

At the Cannes premiere, the film received a long standing ovation, extending for around 16–20 minutes. In September 2026, the Academy of Cinematographic Arts and Sciences of Spain announced La bola negra as its submission for the Academy Award for Best International Feature Film. In October 2026, the European Film Academy announced the film among the 35 titles of the fiction shortlist for the 39th European Film Awards.

=== Accolades ===
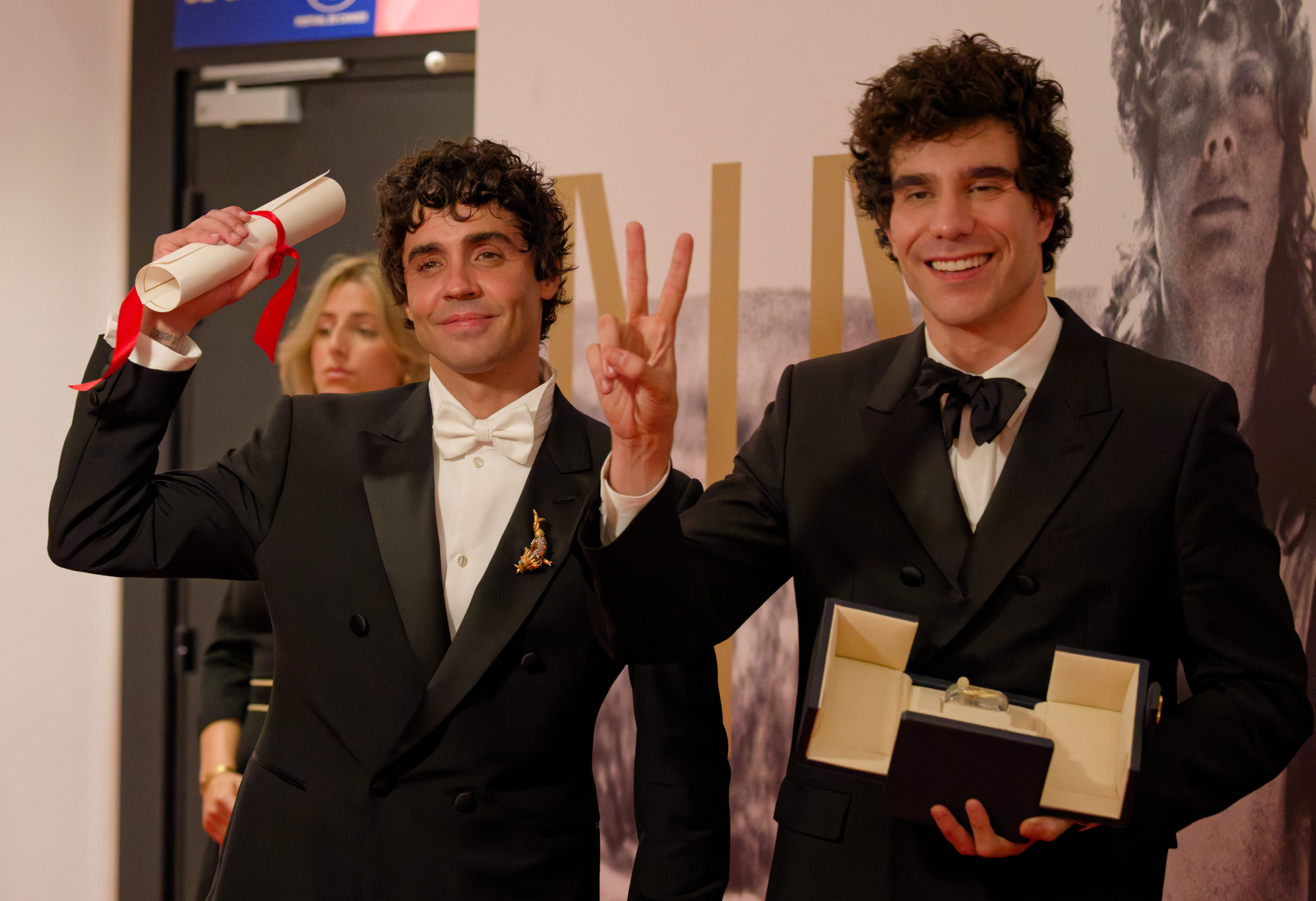
Ambrossi (left) and Calvo (right) showing their Cannes Award on 23 May 2026

| Year | Award | Category | Nominee(s) | Result | Ref. |
|---|---|---|---|---|---|
| 2026 | 79th Cannes Film Festival | Best Director | Javier Ambrossi and Javier Calvo | Won (Note: Tied with Paweł Pawlikowski for Fatherland) | |
| 2026 | 73rd Sydney Film Festival | GIO Audience Award for Best International Feature | La bola negra | Won | |
| 2026 | 51st Toronto International Film Festival | People's Choice Award | | Won | |
| 2026 | 74th San Sebastián International Film Festival | City of Donostia / San Sebastián Audience Award | | Won | |
| 2026 | 31st Busan International Film Festival | 'Flash Forward' Audience Award | | Won | |
| 2026 | 12th CineLibri | Best Literary Adaptation Award | | Won | |
| 2026 | 6th 'Celebración' of Cinema and Television | Director Award | Javier Ambrossi and Javier Calvo | Honored | |
| 2026 | Middleburg Film Festival | International Spotlight Award | Guitarricadelafuente | Honored | |
| 2026 | SCAD Savannah Film Festival | Discovery Award | Guitarricadelafuente | Honored | |
| 2026 | 70th BFI London Film Festival | Audience Award for Best Feature | | Won | |
| 2026 | 17th Hollywood Music in Media Awards | Best Original Score — Independent Film | Raül Refree | Won | |
| 2026 | 17th Hollywood Music in Media Awards | Best Original Song — Independent Film | "La nieve" – Álvaro Lafuente, Raül Refree, and Lucas Duran | Won | |
| 2026 | Gotham Independent Film Awards 2026 | Audience Award | Javier Ambrossi, Javier Calvo | Pending | |
| 2026 | Gotham Independent Film Awards 2026 | Breakthrough Performer | Guitarricadelafuente | Pending | |
| 2026 | Gotham Independent Film Awards 2026 | Vanguard Tribute | Javier Calvo, Javier Ambrossi, Guitarricadelafuente, Miguel Bernardeau, Carlos González, Milo Quifes, Lola Dueñas, Penélope Cruz, Glenn Close | Honored | |
| 2026 | British Independent Film Awards 2026 | Best International Independent Film | Javier Calvo, Javier Ambrossi | Pending | |
| 2026 | 32nd Forqué Awards | Best Film | | Pending | |
| 2026 | 32nd Forqué Awards | Best Actor in a Film | Guitarricadelafuente | Pending | |
| 2026 | 32nd Forqué Awards | Best Actress in a Film | Lola Dueñas | Pending | |
| 2026 | 32nd Forqué Awards | Best Actress in a Film | Penélope Cruz | Pending | |
| 2026 | 32nd Forqué Awards | Cinema and Education in Values | | Pending | |
| 2027 | 39th European Film Awards | Best European Film | | Pending | |
| 2027 | 39th European Film Awards | Best European Director | Javier Calvo, Javier Ambrossi | Pending | |
| 2027 | 39th European Film Awards | Best European Screenwriter | Javier Calvo, Javier Ambrossi, Alberto Conejero | Pending | |
| 2027 | 39th European Film Awards | Best European Casting Director | Eva Leira, Yolanda Serrano | Pending | |
| 2027 | 39th European Film Awards | Best European Cinematographer | Gris Jordana | Pending | |
| 2027 | 39th European Film Awards | Best European Costume Designer | Ana López Cobos | Pending | |
| 2027 | 39th European Film Awards | Best European Editor | Alberto Gutiérrez | Pending | |
| 2027 | 39th European Film Awards | Best European Make-Up & Hair Artist | Pablo Morillas, Mariló Osuna | Pending | |
| 2027 | 39th European Film Awards | Best European Production Designer | Roger Bellés | Pending | |
| 2027 | 39th European Film Awards | Best European Sound | Rodrigo Madrigal, Anna Harrington, Alejandro López, Mayte Cazorla | Pending | |

== See also ==
- List of Spanish films of 2026
- List of French films of 2026
- List of submissions to the 99th Academy Awards for Best International Feature Film
- List of Spanish submissions for the Academy Award for Best International Feature Film
