= Free Falling (film) =

- Theatrical release poster
- Spanish: Caída libre
- Directed by: Laura Jou
- Screenplay by: Bernat Vilaplana
- Produced by: J.A. Bayona; Belén Atienza; Oriol Maymó; Sandra Hermida
- Starring: Belén Rueda; Mariia Netavrovana; Irene Escolar; Ilay Kurelovic; Manuela Vellés
- Cinematography: Marc Gómez del Moral
- Edited by: Guille de la Cal
- Music by: Clara Peya
- Production companies: Colosé Producciones; Corte y Confección de películas; Ejercicios de Equilibrio; Marrowbone; Suspense Entertainment
- Distributed by: Universal Pictures Spain
- Release dates: 25 April 2024 (BCN Film Fest); 17 May 2024 (Spain)
- Country: Spain
- Language: Spanish

Free Falling (Spanish: Caída libre) is a 2024 Spanish thriller drama film directed by Laura Jou from a screenplay by Bernat Vilaplana starring Belén Rueda alongside Irene Escolar, Ilay Kurelovic, and Manuela Vellés.

== Plot ==
The work–life interface of authoritarian and obsessive rhythmic gymnastics coach Marisol is upended upon being ditched by her husband Octavio for younger Raquel. Marisol's behavior towards her pupil Angélica, the national team's great hope for the upcoming World Championships, becomes more and more tyrannical as Marisol fails to get Octavio back.

== Cast ==
- Belén Rueda as Marisol
- Ilay Kurelovic as Octavio
- Maria Netavrovana as Angélica
- Irene Escolar as Claudia
- Manuela Vellés
- Brays Efe

== Production ==
The screenplay was penned by Bernat Vilaplana. The film is a Colosé Producciones, Corte y Confección de películas, Ejercicios de Equilibrio, Marrowbone, and Suspense Entertainment production. Juan Antonio Bayona, Belén Atienza, Oriol Maymó, and Sandra Hermida took over production duties. Shooting locations included Sant Cugat del Vallès' CAR. Clara Peya scored the film.

== Release ==
The film landed its world premiere at the 8th BCN Film Fest on 25 April 2024. It was released theatrically in Spain on 17 May 2024 by Universal.

== Reception ==
Javier Ocaña of Cinemanía rated the film 2½ out of 5 stars, considering it to be a melodrama, that "could have been unbridled and crazy, if it had more depth inside".

Manu Yáñez of Ara rated the film 3 out of 5 stars, writing that despite some overly didactic dialogue and the final plot twists escaping the story's logic, the film manages to "reflect the violence of a world battered by authoritarianism and a lack of empathy".

María Bescós of HobbyConsolas gave a 74 points score ('good'), writing that the film manages to make you wonder what is the limit for such a methodical and manipulative character (Rueda's).

Pablo Vázquez of Fotogramas rated the film 3 out of 5 stars, describing it as "a dedicated and intense psychological melodrama that moves between the stylization of the cliché and sequences that ride between the sublime, the kitsch and the bewilderment".

== See also ==
- List of Spanish films of 2024
