= Life Without Sara Amat =

- Film poster
- Catalan: La vida sense la Sara Amat
- Directed by: Laura Jou
- Screenplay by: Coral Cruz
- Based on: La vida sense la Sara Amat by Pep Puig
- Starring: Biel Rossell; Maria Morera; Francesca Piñón; Anna Sabaté; Jordi Figueras; Isaac Alcayde
- Cinematography: Gris Jordana
- Edited by: Raúl Román
- Music by: Pau Vallvé
- Production companies: La Xarxa de Comunicació Local; Massa d'Or Produccions
- Distributed by: Alfa Pictures
- Release dates: 28 April 2019 (BCN Film Fest); 12 July 2019 (Spain)
- Country: Spain
- Language: Catalan

Life Without Sara Amat (Catalan: La vida sense la Sara Amat) is a 2019 coming-of-age drama film directed by Laura Jou from a screenplay by Coral Cruz based on the novel of the same name by Pep Puig which stars Biel Rosell and Maria Morera. It is shot in Catalan.

== Plot ==
The plot is set in a village in the 1980s. Sara Amat, the crush of 13-year-old Pep, is missing. Pep just happens to find her in his room, with Sara asking to stay for a while and subjecting Pep to tests that force him to mature quickly before the end of the summer.

== Cast ==
- Biel Rossell as Pep
- Maria Morera as Sara Amat
- Francesca Piñón as Pep's grandmother
- Anna Sabaté as Sara's mother
- Jordi Figueras as Sara's father
- Isaac Alcayde as mayor
- Joan Amargós

== Production ==
The film was produced by La Xarxa de Comunicació Local alongside Massa d'Or Produccions. Shooting locations in Catalonia included Tàrrega and Granyanella (both in the province of Lleida) and Cerdanyola del Vallès and Santa Eulàlia de Ronçana (both in the province of Barcelona).

== Release ==
The film was presented at the BCN Film Fest on 28 April 2019. Distributed by Alfa Pictures, it was released theatrically in Spain on 12 July 2019.

== Reception ==
Federico Marín Bellón of ABC assessed that the kids' performances are fantastic and that the mise-en-scène displays no superfluous dialogues.

Mirito Torreiro of Fotogramas rated the film 3 out of 5 stars, writing that "its storytelling is thoughtful, its youthful actors work suitably well and, overall, it is enjoyable to watch".

Toni Vall of Cinemanía rated the film 3 out of 5 stars writing that the story "improves as the film goes on" and "the ending is open, inspiring, fantastic".

== Accolades ==
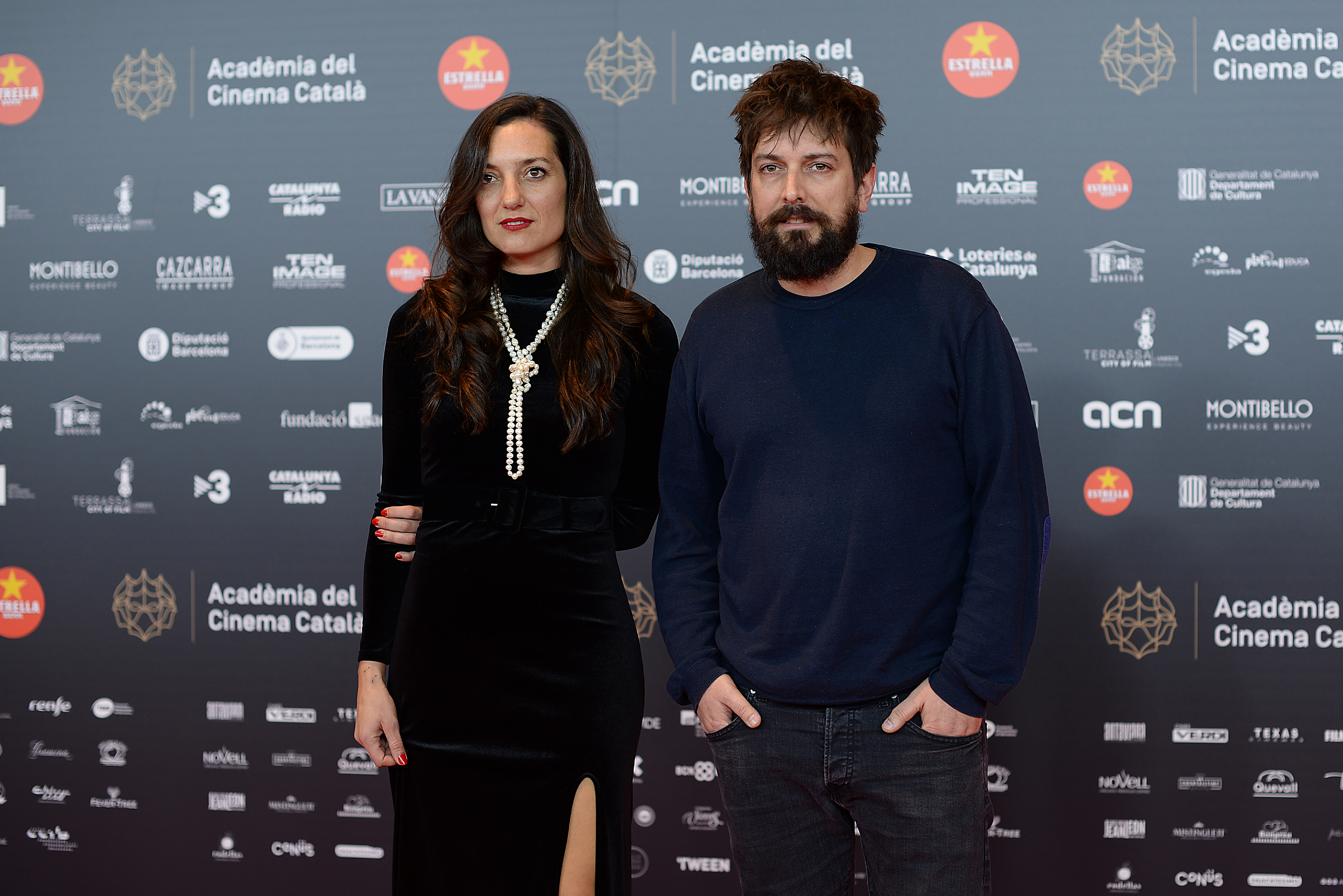
Cinematographer Gris Jordana and composer Paul Vallvé attending the red carpet of the 12th Gaudí Awards on 19 January 2020

Year	Award	Category	Nominee(s)	Result	Ref.
2020	12th Gaudí Awards	Best Original Score	Pau Vallvé	Won	
2020	12th Gaudí Awards	Best Cinematography	Gris Jordana	Nominated	

== See also ==
- List of Spanish films of 2019
