= Head on the Wall =

- Spanish: Una cabeza en la pared
- Directed by: Manuel Manrique
- Screenplay by: Manuel Manrique; Itziar Sanjuán
- Based on: Una cabeza en la pared (short film) by Manuel Manrique and Itziar Sanjuán
- Starring: Nacho Sánchez; Iria del Río; Miguel Bernardeau
- Cinematography: Alejandro Buera
- Edited by: Pablo Barce; Celia Sánchez Ortiz
- Music by: Alberto Torres
- Production companies: Una Cabeza en la Pared LP AIE; Kabiria Films; Inaudita; Malas Compañías; Sabina Films
- Distributed by: Filmax (Spain)
- Countries: Spain; Portugal
- Language: Spanish

Head on the Wall (Spanish: Una cabeza en la pared) is an upcoming drama film directed by Manuel Manrique (in his directorial debut feature) and co-written by Itziar Sanjuán based on their short film of the same name. It stars Nacho Sánchez alongside Iria del Río and Miguel Bernardeau. It is a Spanish-Portuguese co-production.

== Plot ==
Set against the backdrop of the cultural clash between modernity and tradition, the plot follows the struggles of bullfighter Rafael Jesús after the abolition of bullfighting in Spain.

== Cast ==
- Nacho Sánchez as Rafael Jesús
- Iria del Río as Aurora
- Miguel Bernardeau as Beltrán
- Kandido Uranga as Lastur
- Paula Usero as Lorena
- Óscar Lasarte as El Chichi
- Manolo Caro as Agusto
- Juan Gea as Pedro
- Rodrigo Tomás as El Portugués
- Rita Cabaço as Filipa

== Production ==
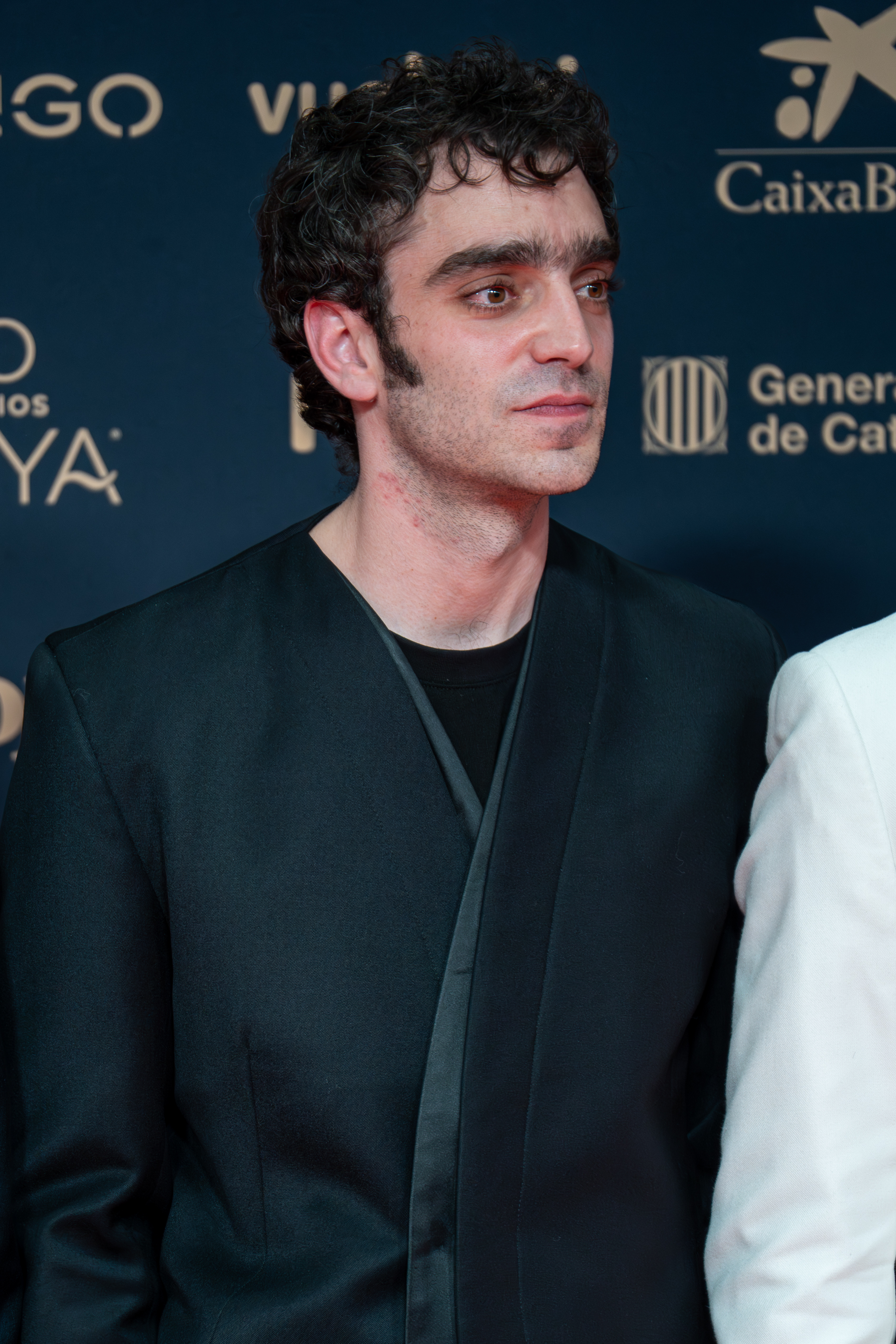
Sánchez (pictured attending the 40th Goya Awards on occasion of the short film nomination) returned for the feature-length adaptation

The development of the project started by 2022. As a first step, it was developed as a short film directed by Manuel Manrique, also titled Una cabeza en la pared, premiering at the 69th Valladolid International Film Festival in November 2024. It starred Nacho Sánchez and Ángela Cervantes. The short went on to win six Fugaz Awards in 2025 and was nominated for Best Fictional Short Film at the 40th Goya Awards in 2026.

For the feature-length version, Nacho Sánchez was cast again for the leading role as bullfighter. The film is a Spanish-Portuguese co-production by Una Cabeza en la Pared LP AIE, Kabiria Films, Inaudita, Malas Compañías and Sabina Films with backing from RTVE, RTP, À Punt, ICAA, IVC, and the Madrid regional administration.

Alejandro Buera took over the direction of photography. Part of the filming took place in Ávila in October 2025. Shooting locations in the city included the Centro de Congresos y Exposiciones Lienzo Norte as well as temporary amusement fair attractions.

The project was selected for the post-production forum 'Impulso WIP' at the 11th Abycine festival.

== Release ==
Filmax acquired Spanish theatrical distribution rights.

== See also ==
- List of Spanish films of 2026
