= Carlos González (actor) =

Spanish actor (born 1997)

- González in 2026
- Born: Carlos González Fernández; 24 May 1997 (age 29); Cintruénigo, Navarre, Spain
- Occupation: Actor

Carlos González Fernández (born 24 May 1997) is a Spanish actor.

== Life and career ==
Carlos González Fernández was born in Cintruénigo, Navarre, on 24 May 1997. His father's family is from Cervera del Río Alhama.

He moved to Madrid to train his acting chops at the Corazza school. He then landed his television debut in Señoras del (h)AMPA. It was followed by an appearance in Veneno, portraying Alfonso, a friend of the protagonist. For his first leading role, he portrayed Bob Pop in the miniseries Queer You Are. He also featured as Da in the series Todas las veces que nos enamoramos (2023). In 2025, he played the role of castrato singer Farinelli in the historical comedy series La vida breve, and that of orchestra director Rafael Ibarbia in the miniseries La canción, as well as Saúl in the musical series Mariliendre. In May 2025, he joined the cast of the drama film La bola negra in a leading role. He featured in the romantic comedy film An Island Away From You (2026), presented at the 29th Málaga Film Festival. He also worked in Salvador Calvo's Cómo vole sobre el nido del cuco, which was reported to have wrapped shooting in March 2026. and was cast as Frígilis in Mar Coll's La Regenta.

== Filmography ==
=== Film ===
Year	Title	Role	Notes	Ref.
2026	A una isla de ti (An Island Away from You)	Pichi		
2026	La bola negra (The Black Ball)	Alberto		

== Accolades ==
Year	Award	Category	Work	Result	Ref.
2026	34th Actors and Actresses Union Awards	Best Television Actor in a Secondary Role	La vida breve	Nominated	
