= Gris Jordana =

Spanish cinematographer

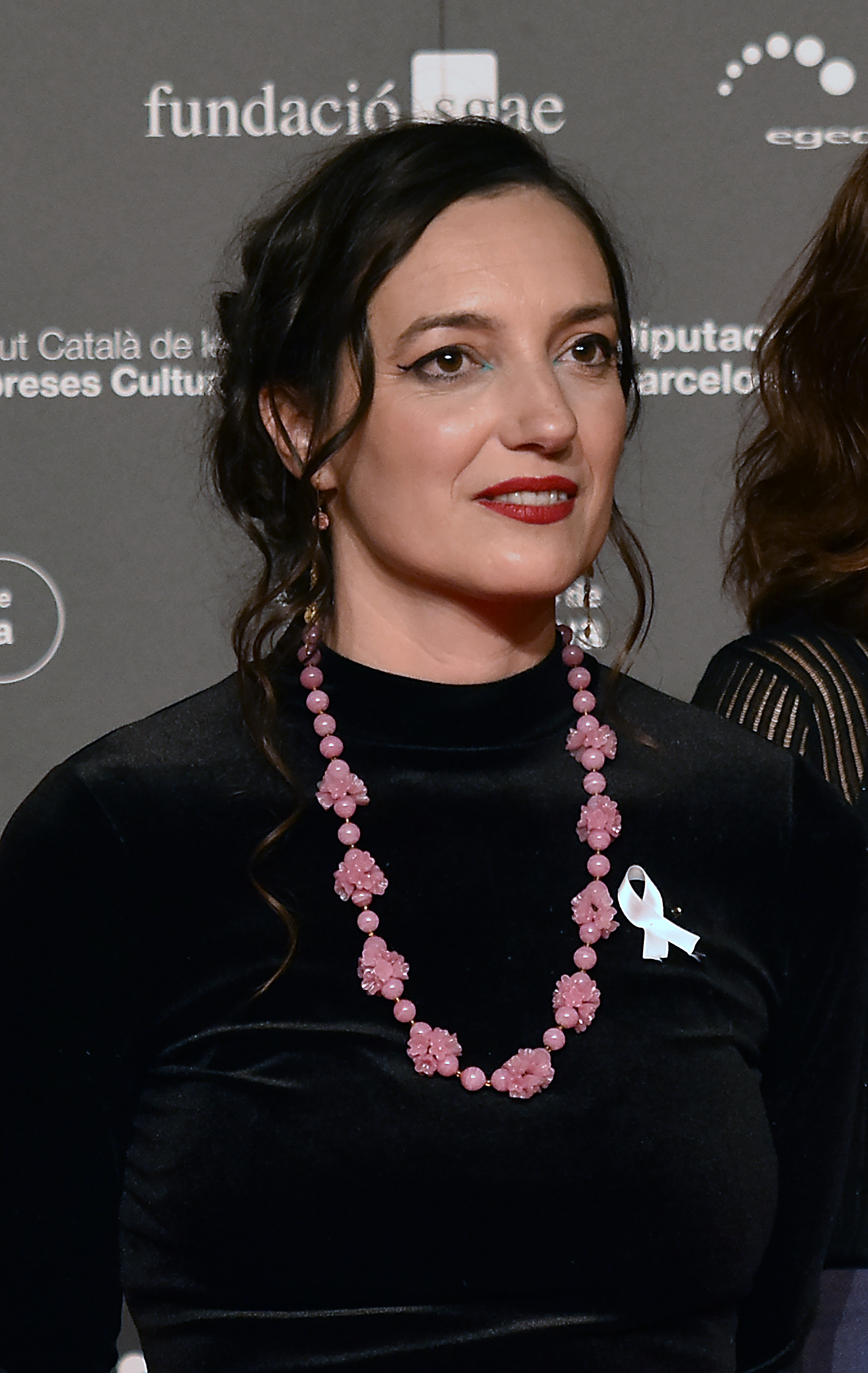
- Jordana in 2022
- Born: 1981 (age 44–45); Manlleu, Catalonia, Spain
- Education: ESCAC; Ngee Ann Polytechnic
- Occupation: Cinematographer

Griselda "Gris" Jordana (born 1981) is a Spanish cinematographer.

== Life and career ==
Jordana was born in Manlleu in 1981 and was raised in Tona, Catalonia. Prior to entering the film school she intended to study screenwiting. She studied cinematography at the ESCAC and the Ngee Ann Polytechnic in Singapore. Her early work include credits in films such Liliana Torres' Family Tour (2013), Pozoamargo (2015), Hayati: My Life (2018), Taxi to Gibraltar (2019), and Life Without Sara Amat (2019); television series such as Welcome to the Family and the short films directed by Clara Roquet.

After getting Javier Ambrossi and Javier Calvo's attention with a proposal containing pictures from Nan Goldin and pictures of lost towns with children, she first worked with Los Javis in the miniseries Veneno (2020). She went on to collaborate again with the creators in the miniseries La mesías (2023; shot in 16 mm and digital) and in La bola negra (2026, shot in 35 mm). For her work in Clara Roquet's Libertad (2021), she earned her first nomination for the Goya Award for Best Cinematography and won the Gaudí Award for Best Cinematography. She earned another Goya nomination for her work in I Am Nevenka (2024).
