= Pozoamargo (film) =

- Directed by: Enrique Rivero
- Written by: Enrique Rivero
- Produced by: Paola Herrera; Enrique Rubio; Gerardo Morán
- Starring: Jesús Gallego; Natalia de Molina; Xuaco Carballido; Sophie Gómez; Elsa Díaz; Fidela Sanz; Sara Maldonado; Axel Ricco
- Cinematography: Gris Jordana
- Edited by: Enrique Rivero; Javier Ruiz Caldera
- Production companies: Una Comunión; Zeitun Films; Zamora Films
- Distributed by: Márgenes (Spain)
- Release dates: November 2015 (Seville); 24 June 2016 (Spain)
- Countries: Mexico; Spain
- Language: Spanish

Pozoamargo is a 2015 drama film written and directed by Enrique Rivero. It is a Mexican-Spanish co-production.

== Plot ==
After transmitting a venereal disease to a pregnant woman, a man consumed by guilt flees and moves to the village of Pozoamargo to work as a day laborer in agriculture, coming across Gloria, a young woman possessing an ardent sex drive.

== Cast ==
- Jesús Gallego as Jesús
- Natalia de Molina as Gloria
- Xuaco Carballido
- Sophie Gómez

== Production ==
The film is an Una Comunión, Zeitun Films, and Zamora Films production.

== Release ==
The film was presented at the 12th Seville European Film Festival in November 2015. Distributed by Márgenes, it was released theatrically in Spain on 24 June 2016.

== Reception ==
Nando Salvà of El Periódico de Catalunya gave the film a 2-star rating, finding the film to be a portfolio of (cheap) tricks such as "an air of superiority toward the characters and the exploitation of their miseries", an "stylistic affectation", and the "explicit depiction of extreme acts" just for shock value.

The 3-star review on Cinemanía considered that Rivero "delves into the penitent's anguish in an attempt to understand a cruel emotion".

Jordi Costa of El País observed that the story concerns about "a twisted cycle of redemption", with the film being "imbued from beginning to end with a highly unconventional poetic spirit".

Alfonso Rivera of Cineuropa declared the film "a disturbing picture capable of evoking both unease and discomfort".

== See also ==
- List of Spanish films of 2016
