= Rafael Rodríguez Rapún =

Spanish actor and soldier

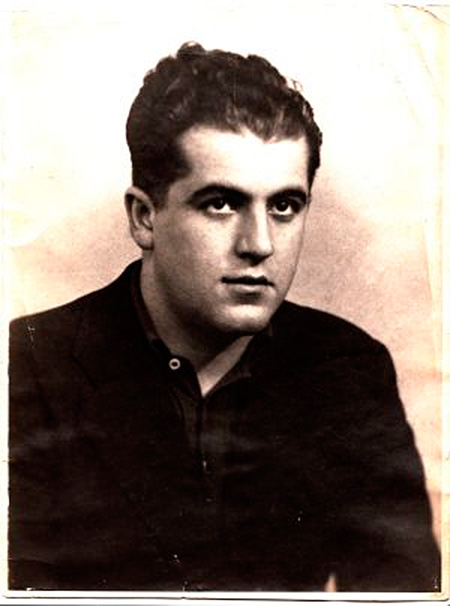
Image of Rafael Rodríguez Rapún

Rafael Rodríguez Rapún (1912–18 August 1937) was a Spanish footballer, actor and soldier during the Spanish Civil War. He was the lover of Spanish poet Federico García Lorca.

== Life ==
A mining engineer by profession, he was a sportsman, Atlético Madrid footballer, PSOE activist, Rafael Rodríguez Rapún was from a working-class background.

In 1933, he joined Federico García Lorca's La Barraca theater company as an actor. García Lorca affectionately nicknamed him "The Man with the Three Rs", in reference to his initials.

Luis Sáenz de la Calzada, a painter and also an actor of La Barraca, described his: "Kinky hair, not very wide forehead furrowed by a deep transverse wrinkle; correct nose that gave him, to a certain extent, the profile of a Greek statue."

García Lorca and Rodríguez Rapún fell in love during the summer of 1935 tour of La Barraca, when he named him clerk of the company.

Once the assassination of García Lorca by Francoist militias was announced at the end of summer 1936, Rodríguez Rapún decided to join the front to defend the Republic during the Spanish Civil War. After undergoing artillery training in the town of Lorca, province of Murcia, he was sent to the Cantabrian front with a rank of lieutenant.

He died on 18 August 1937 during the Battle of Santander, a year after the assassination of his lover.

His memory was resurfaced by Ian Gibson in the book "Lorca y el mundo gay" in 2009, by the playwright Alberto Conejero in the play La piedra oscura, adapted into the 2026 movie La bola negra by Javier Ambrossi and Javier Calvo, (which premiered at the 2026 Cannes Film Festival), and by writer and friend of Rafael, María Teresa León, who considered him one the muses of the masterpiece Los Sonetos del amor oscuro. Others believe, however, that the inspiration was Juan Ramírez de Lucas, another love interest of the poet.
