= La bola negra (play) =

Unfinished play by Federico García Lorca

- Author: Federico García Lorca
- Language: Spanish
- Genre: Play

La bola negra is an unfinished play with a homosexual theme by the Spanish writer Federico García Lorca, who began writing it in 1936, the year he was murdered during the Spanish Civil War.

Information about the title and the first part comes from a 67-line letter addressed to the playwright Cipriano Rivas Cherif. The play begins with a scene in which the protagonist, a wealthy young man, tells his father that he had tried to gain admission to the prestigious casino in Granada. To decide whether or not he could join, the casino members had to vote using white and black balls. In the end, the protagonist gets the black ball, and when his father asks him why, he replies that he was not accepted because he is gay.

The plot of the rest of the play is unknown, as the author, Federico García Lorca, only managed to write the first four pages before being shot by members of the nationalist faction during the Spanish Civil War.

In January 2025, film directors and producers Javier Calvo and Javier Ambrossi announced that they would produce a film adaptation titled simply La bola negra, which would premiere on the Movistar Plus streaming platform. Released in 2026, the film imagines that the play was actually finished with only a few pages of the manuscript left missing, with the fictional discovery of the pages in 2017 and the depiction of this version of the play acting as two of three connected storylines in the film. In addition to the play's surviving pages, the filmmakers utilised Lorca's own recollection of the Sanjurjada in 1932 and, centrally, his personal experience of the fire at Granada's casino on August 10th 1932 to construct a further storyline for the unfinished play.
