= The Light (2026 film) =

- Theatrical release poster
- Spanish: La luz
- Directed by: Fernando Franco
- Written by: Fernando Franco
- Produced by: Merry Colomer
- Starring: Alberto San Juan; Pedro Casablanc; Miguel Rellán; María Galiana; Luis Callejo; Ramón Barea
- Cinematography: Santiago Racaj
- Edited by: Miguel Doblado
- Music by: Maite Arroitajauregi Aranburu
- Production companies: Morena Films; Ferdydurke Films; La luz la película AIE; Potemkino
- Distributed by: Buena Vista International
- Release dates: 27 May 2026 (Cines Nervión); 5 June 2026 (Spain)
- Running time: 120 minutes
- Countries: Spain; Belgium
- Language: Spanish

The Light (Spanish: La luz) is a 2026 drama film written and directed by Fernando Franco starring Alberto San Juan.

It was released theatrically in Spain on 5 June 2026 by Buena Vista International.

== Plot ==
The plot follows Manuel, a Catholic priest on the verge of leaving the priesthood whose past misdeeds come to haunt him.

== Cast ==
- Alberto San Juan as Manuel Monsalve
- Pedro Casablanc as obispo Alcalá
- Miguel Rellán as arzobispo Tamargo
- María Galiana as madre
- Luis Callejo as Iñaki
- Ramón Barea as padre Luis
- Pablo Gómez-Pando as dr. Morilla
- Nacho Sánchez as Alberto
- Santiago Mayorga as Víctor
- Antonio Zafra as Jaime
- Itziar Aizpuru as Rosa

== Production ==
RTVE acquired broadcasting rights to the film in 2024, ahead of the film entering production. The film was produced by Morena Films alongside Ferdydurke Films, Potemkino, and La Luz la Película AIE with backing from ICAA and Creative Europe MEDIA, and the participation of RTVE, Movistar Plus+, and Canal Sur. Santiago Racaj worked as cinematographer. Shooting locations included the centre of Vitoria-Gasteiz, around the Old Cathedral, the Archivo General de Indias, and the municipalities of Carmona and Alcalá de Guadaíra. At the 'El cine que somos' presentation gala hold by RTVE in March 2026, Franco described his film as "raising the question of how the Catholic Church's abuse scandals is being handled; it argues that we are not talking about sins but about crimes". It tells the story from the point of view of the repentant abuser.

== Release ==
The film had its premiere at Cines Nervión in Seville on 27 May 2026. Distributed by Buena Vista International, the film is scheduled to be released theatrically on 5 June 2026, on the eve of Pope Leo XIV's official visit to Spain. It is the first film by Franco distributed by a major film studio. Sales company Latido Films took the film to the 2026 Marché du Film.

== Reception ==
Carlos Boyero of El País liked "the unease and questions this strange and dark film" evoked in him.

Philipp Engel of La Vanguardia rated the film 4 out of 5 stars, deeming a "frankly immense" San Juan, bringing a wealth of nuance to the character, to be clearly deserving to win his third Goya award for "the most challenging role of his career".

Sergi Sánchez of La Razón gave the film a 2-star rating, writing that the film's extremely risky approach would may have worked if Franco was Paul Schrader in First Reformed and San Juan had worked his character with more registers beyond "astonishment".

In a 4-star rating, Luis Martínez of El Mundo, assessed that the film boasts a Spinozian character, yet makes no secret of its Augustinian inclinations, adding that it "manages to describe without passing judgment, to analyze without succumbing to righteous anger".

== Accolades ==
Year	Award	Category	Nominee(s)	Result	Ref.
2026	32nd Forqué Awards	Best Actor in a Film	Alberto San Juan	Pending	

== See also ==
- List of Spanish films of 2026
