= Lo que hay =

Written work by Sara Torres

- Author: Sara Torres
- Language: Spanish
- Genre: Autofiction
- Publisher: Reservoir Books
- Publication date: 2022
- Publication place: Spain
- ISBN: 978-8-417-91096-9

Lo que hay (English: What it is) is a autofiction novel by the Spanish author Sara Torres published in 2022. The book explores the story of a protagonist who loses her mother and her female lover at almost the same time.

== Synopsis ==
The book opens with the protagonist finding herself making love to a woman in a room of a Barcelona hotel while her mother lays dying of cancer. She has booked plane tickets to visit her the next day, not knowing that her mother had already died. As her lover disappears and leaves without a trace, she feels disappointed and alone while facing grief from the loss of both her mother and lover. Meanwhile, her partner returns from London to provide her support and settles with her in an apartment along the coast.

== Analysis ==
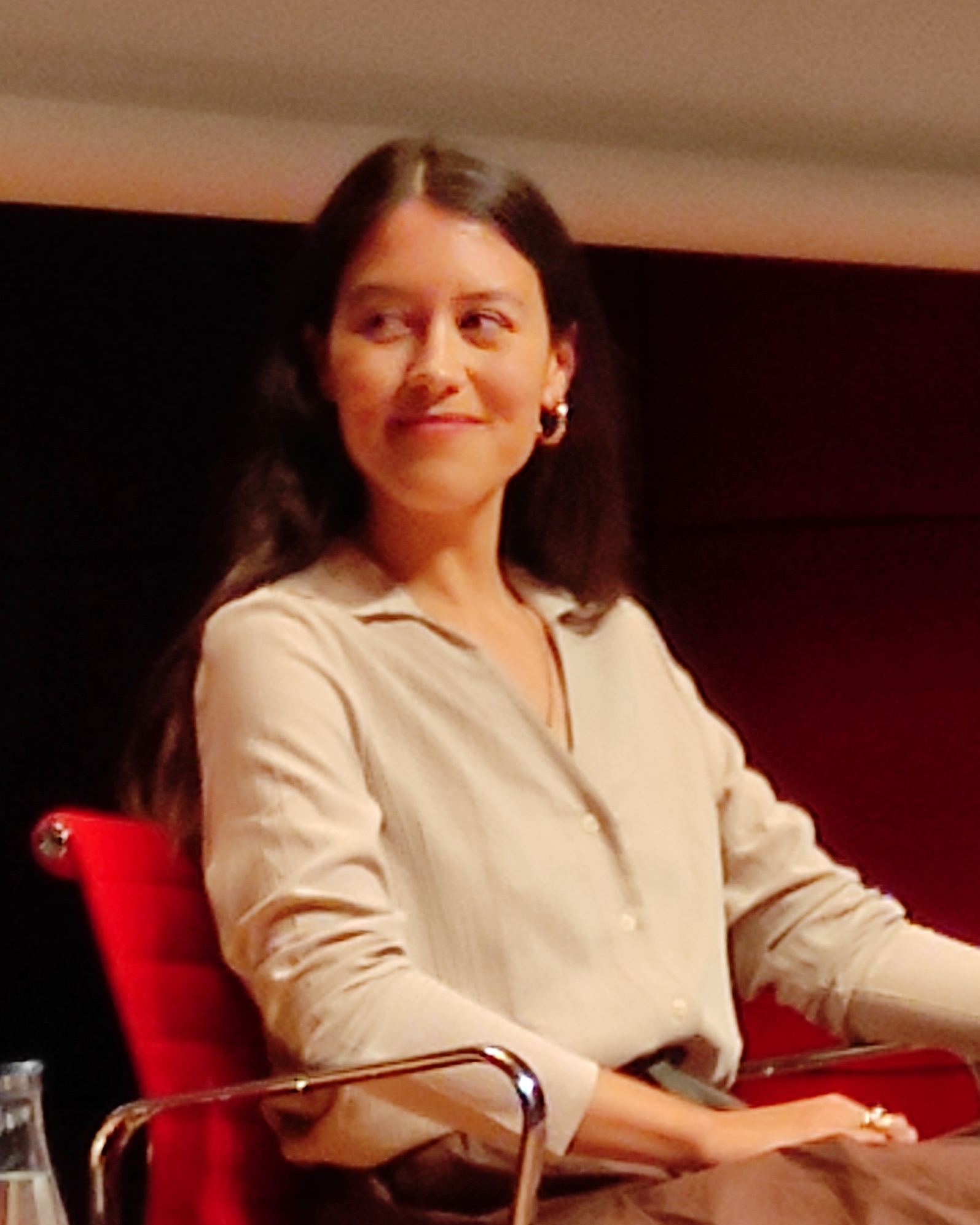
Author Sara Torres in 2024

The novel, written by Sara Torres, was published on 5 May 2022. The title of the novel comes from the Asturian expression.

The autofiction novel deals with themes similar to those addressed in several of the author's previously published poems. The autobiographical component of the book comes from the author's own experience of her mother being diagnosed with terminal cancer when she was 18, and who would die ten years later. Sections from the first part of the book comes from the author's trip to the Asturias to attend her mother's funeral.

In the novel, the author deals with issues such as guilt, desire, mourning and love. It reflects on issues of personal relationships between women, monogamy, and loss of love. The protagonist introspects along these themes through memories of the past.

== Reception ==
The newspaper El Español highlighted that the work "reflects desire with an almost poetic language". El Mundo lauded the way in which the premature loss of her mother and the mourning of the protagonist is detailed, while also exploring the relationships of love and desire between women.

In 2023, the novel received the Javier Morote award from the Spanish Confederation of Guilds and Associations of Booksellers under the category "Best Revelation (Author)".
