= Alberto Cortés =

Spanish actor

Alberto Cortés Ruiz (born 1983) is a Spanish actor and dramaturge.

Born in Málaga, he studied stage management and dramaturgy at Escuela Superior de Arte Dramático and history of art at Malaga University. He is the author of Analphabet, El ardor, One Night at the Golden Bar, Los chicos de la playa, Adoro, Siempre vengo de noche and El sueño de Ester.

He made his film debut as Federico García Lorca in La bola negra, directed by Javier Ambrossi and Javier Calvo.
