= Nacho Sánchez (actor) =

Spanish actor

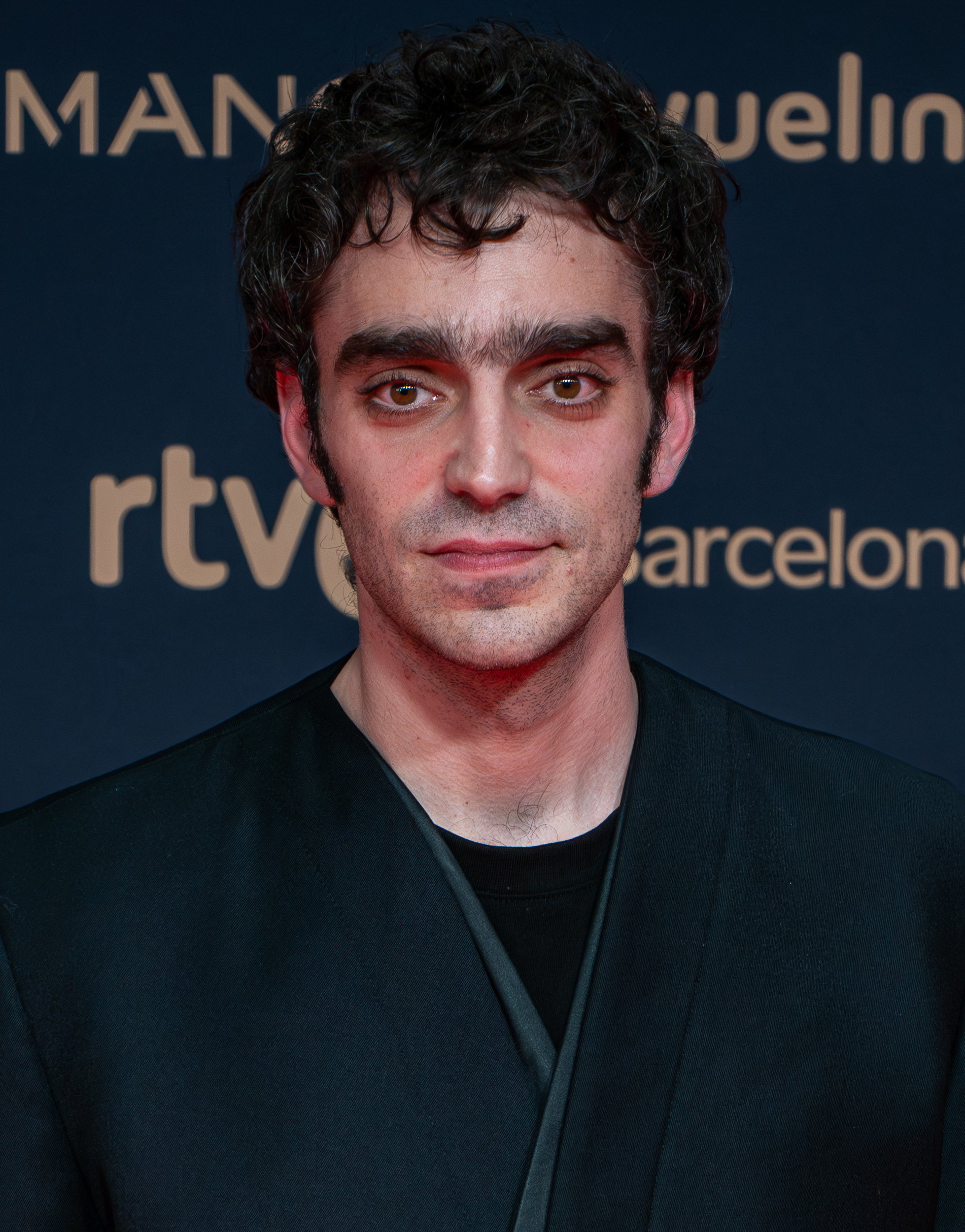
- Sánchez in 2026
- Born: 1992 (age 33–34); Ávila, Spain
- Occupation: Actor

Nacho Sánchez (born 1992) is a Spanish stage and screen actor. After earning early recognition in plays such as La piedra oscura and Ivan and the Dogs, he made his feature film debut in the 2019 film Seventeen, clinching a nomination to the Goya Award for Best New Actor. He has since featured in films such The Art of Return (2020), and Manticore (2022), for which he earned a nomination to the Goya Award for Best Actor.

== Biography ==
Nacho Sánchez was born in Ávila in 1992. He made his baby steps on stage in the IES Isabel de Castilla's theatre group 'Criatura'. He was discovered by Pablo Messiez, who gave Sánchez a role in the play La piedra oscura, where Sánchez starred alongside Daniel Grao as a young soldier named Sebastián. Sánchez' performance in the play earned him the Actors and Actresses Union Award for Best New Actor. He has since starred in different plays in the Teatro Español, including the monologue Ivan and the Dogs portraying Ivan Mishukov. His performance in the former play earned him the Max Award for Best Leading Actor, thereby reportedly becoming the youngest recipient ever in the history of the award category. Also in the Teatro Español, he starred alongside Emma Vilarasau in the staging of El sueño de la vida, an unfinished work by Federico García Lorca. For his television debut in 2016, Sánchez appeared in a minor role as Rafael Ríos in two episodes of season two of El ministerio del tiempo ("Tiempo de valientes").

Sánchez made his feature film debut in Daniel Sánchez Arévalo's film Seventeen. He starred alongside Biel Montoro and portrayed Ismael, the elder brother of Montoro's Héctor, whom with the character embarks on road trip across the Cantabrian coast. His performance clinched him a nomination to the Goya Award for Best New Actor. He then featured alongside Macarena García and Ingrid García-Jonsson in the 2020 film The Art of Return, directed by Pedro Collantes. He also featured in The Sea Beyond. He starred alongside Jorge Perugorría in the Filmin streaming series Doctor Portuondo, released in 2021, portraying the role of Carlo Padial, the creator of the series. Also in 2021, he landed a starring role in Carlos Vermut's Manticore, portraying Julián, a video game designer tortured by a grim secret.

He featured in supporting roles in Fernando Franco's films Subsuelo (2025) as the partner of the protagonist, and The Light (2026), as the victim of a child molester. He signed on to star in Head on the Wall, reprising his role in the short film of the same name as a bullfighter. Resuming collaboration with Fernando Franco, he was also cast as García Lorca in Lorca, a drama set in the last days of the poet before his murder in Granada.

== Filmography ==
Key
†	Denotes films that have not yet been released

Year	Title	Role	Notes	Ref.
2019	Diecisiete (Seventeen)	Ismael		
2020	El arte de volver (The Art of Return)	Carlos		
2021	Doctor Portuondo	Carlo Padial		
2022	Mantícora (Manticore)	Julián		
2025	Subsuelo	Ramón		
2026	La luz (The Light)	Alberto		
TBA	Una cabeza en la pared † (Head on the Wall)	Rafael Jesús		
TBA	Lorca †	Federico García Lorca		

== Accolades ==
Year	Award	Category	Work	Result	Ref.
2016	25th Actors and Actresses Union Awards	Best New Actor	La piedra oscura	Won	
2018	21st Max Awards	Best Leading Actor	Ivan and the Dogs	Won	
2020	75th CEC Medals	Best New Actor	Seventeen	Nominated	
2020	34th Goya Awards	Best New Actor	Seventeen	Nominated	
2020	29th Actors and Actresses Union Awards	Best Film Actor in a Secondary Role	Seventeen	Nominated	
2022	28th Forqué Awards	Best Film Actor	Manticore	Nominated	
2023	10th Feroz Awards	Best Actor in a Film	Manticore	Won	
2023	78th CEC Medals	Best Actor	Manticore	Nominated	
2023	37th Goya Awards	Best Actor	Manticore	Nominated	
