= Manticore (2022 film) =

- Theatrical release poster by Carlos Vermut
- Spanish: Mantícora
- Directed by: Carlos Vermut
- Written by: Carlos Vermut
- Starring: Nacho Sánchez; Zoe Stein
- Cinematography: Alana Mejía González
- Edited by: Emma Tusell
- Music by: Damián Schwartz
- Production companies: Aquí y Allí Films; BTeam Prods; Magnética Films; Punto Nemo AIE; 34-T Cinema
- Distributed by: BTeam Pictures
- Release dates: 13 September 2022 (Toronto); 9 December 2022 (Spain)
- Running time: 115 minutes
- Countries: Spain; Estonia
- Language: Spanish

Manticore (Spanish: Mantícora) is 2022 psychological drama thriller film written and directed by Carlos Vermut, and starring Nacho Sánchez and Zoe Stein. An international co-production between Spain and Estonia that blends elements of mumblecore with tragedy and deals with its protagonist's hamartia, the film's storyline follows the romantic relationship between a video game designer (Sánchez) and an art history student (Stein), with the former hoping to find happiness with the latter and thus to subdue his recently awakened pedophilic impulses.

Manticore had its world premiere at the 2022 Toronto International Film Festival. It was nominated for the 37th Goya Awards in four categories (Director, Original Screenplay, Leading Actor, New Actress). The film was released in Spain in December 2022.

== Plot ==
Living alone in an apartment in the centre of Madrid, Julián is a successful game designer who creates monsters for video games with help of VR tools. A fire in the neighbouring apartment traps inside a boy called Cristian and Julián comes to his rescue. After receiving light medical attention, Julián befriends the boy, who confides to him that he wants to become a gardener when he grows up; Julián tells Cristian that in his childhood he wanted to be a tiger. Back in his apartment, Julián cannot fall asleep and experiences a panic attack. His physician prescribes him anxiolytics and recommends talking to other people in order to speed up his recovery. Julián has a bad sex experience with a girl he meets in a bar and begins to develop acute interest in Cristian's physical features. With human NPC templates from his work and from a hand-drawn sketch of the boy, Julián starts to reproduce Cristian in the VR, becoming aroused in the process. At a party organised for his colleague, Julián meets Diana, a boyish girl from Barcelona looking after her ill father in Madrid and studying for a distance learning degree in art history, with whom he eventually starts a relationship after meeting again near the Filmoteca. Julián removes all traces of his VR work on Cristian and commits to Diana. He rents a new apartment on the outskirts of Madrid where he performs a rim job on Diana, who gets the news of her father's sudden death.

Julián visits the funeral home to console Diana. Wanting to avoid communication with her mother, Diana travels with the company of Julián to her father's seaside hometown in Catalonia. Julián has another panic attack there and is soothed by Diana. He is summoned to a company meeting and informed that because the company keeps a register of all works created and developed with its tools by its employees, the management knows the full extent of Julián's portfolio. Julián tries to phone Diana, but she ghosts him. Still wanting to talk to her, Julián brings Japanese food to Diana's home and tells her that nobody has ever been harmed by his actions. Diana is disgusted by Julián and tells him to leave. Anxious and upset, Julián arrives at his former apartment building and communicates with Cristian via the gate intercom, knowing that Cristian's mother is out and the boy is home alone. In Cristian's apartment he prepares a Cola Cao for them, pouring drugs into one of the cups. After Cristian drinks it and falls asleep, Julián takes him to his bedroom, but he is torn about his next actions and then on the wall he sees Cristian's drawing of a tiger with a human head, named 'Julián'. Julián gets out of the bedroom and attempts suicide by defenestration, waking up in a hospital. The doctor informs him that he has suffered severe spinal cord injury and undergone several surgical operations whilst unconscious, with Diana staying by his side during that time. The film ends with Diana entering her apartment and taking care of a paralysed Julián, speaking to him in Catalan.

== Cast ==
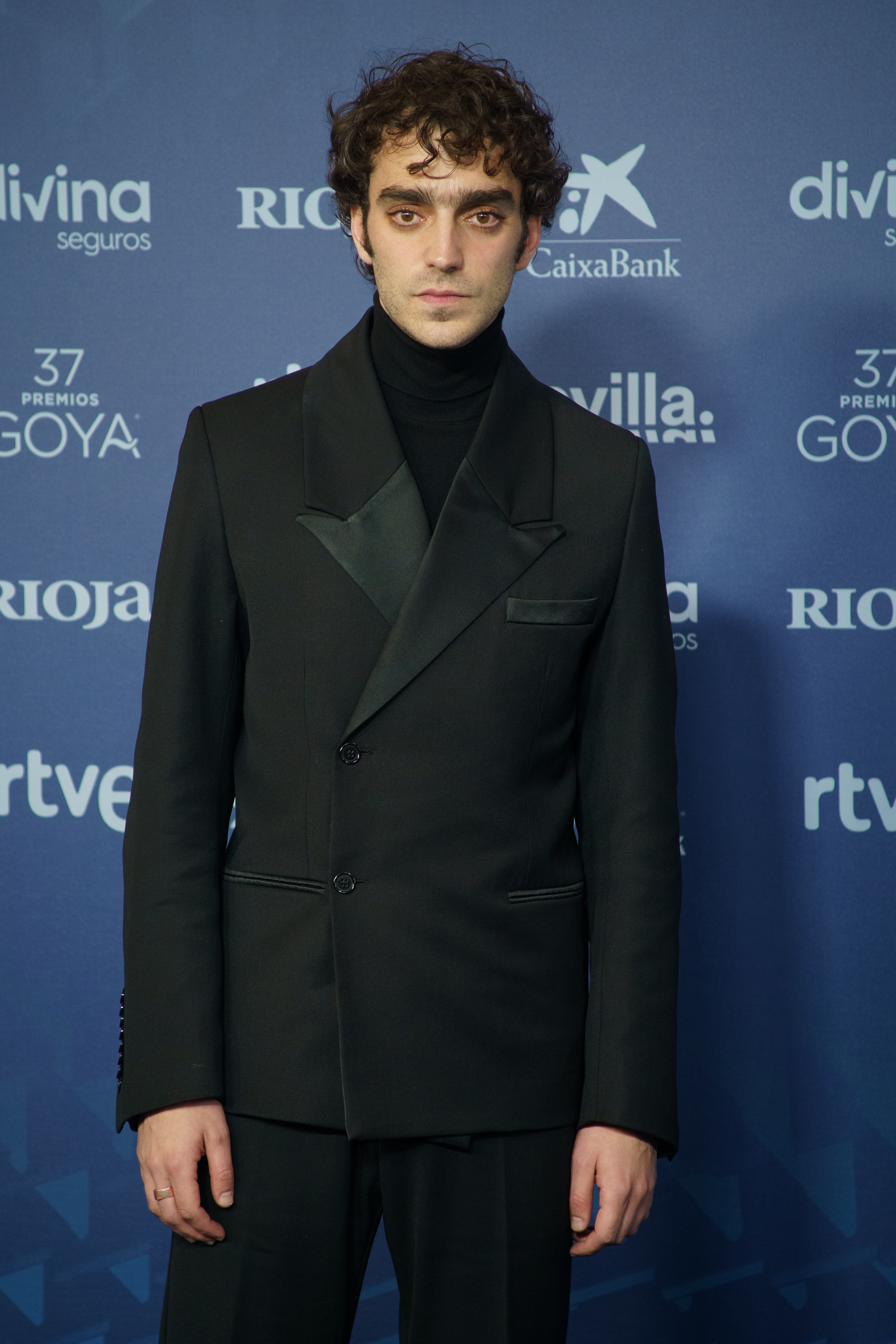
Nacho Sánchez

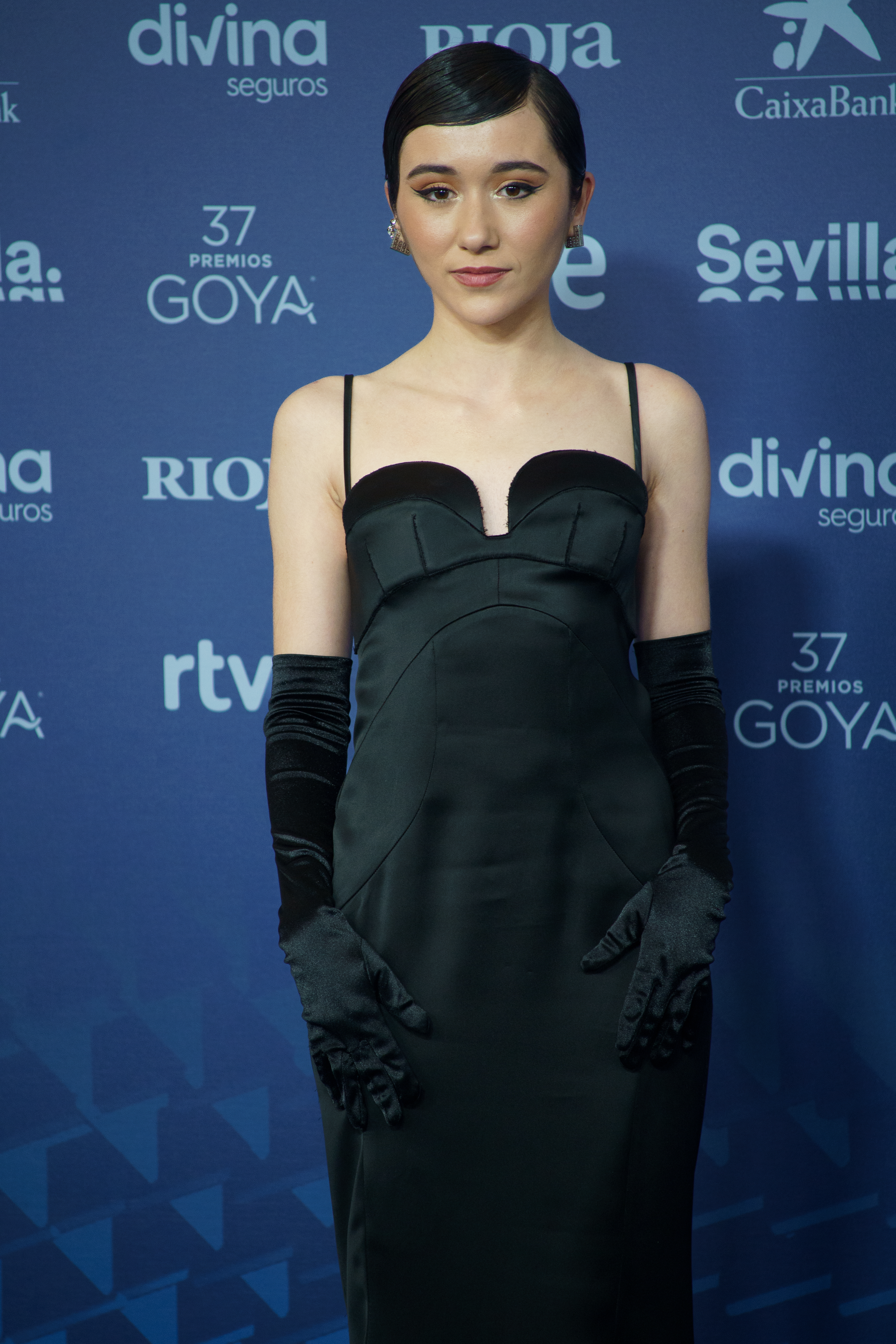
Zoe Stein

- Nacho Sánchez as Julián
- Zoe Stein as Diana
- Vicenta Ndongo
- Aitziber Garmendia
- Miquel Insua
- Ángela Boix
- Catalina Sopelana
- Javier Lago
- Álvaro Sanz Rodríguez
- Patrick Martino

== Production ==
The screenplay was penned by Vermut, in part as an adaptation of classic werewolf films on the premise that they originally sought to depict "humans managing forbidden sexual desires", with motivation for the project coming from approaching the theme of pedophilia as a curse and portraying how a pedophile may try to "cheat" on those forbidden impulses with proxies such as VR or a look-alike of a child. Vermut said that the original idea for the film came from the story of his lesbian friend whose appearance resembled Justin Bieber somewhat and who felt cheated and used in her relationship with her partner when she found that that resemblance was the reason why the partner was with her. Vermut stated that "I think it is my film with the highest levels of discomfort. I like to confront the things that scare me through film. And I guess looking Julián in the eye is a way of dealing with it".

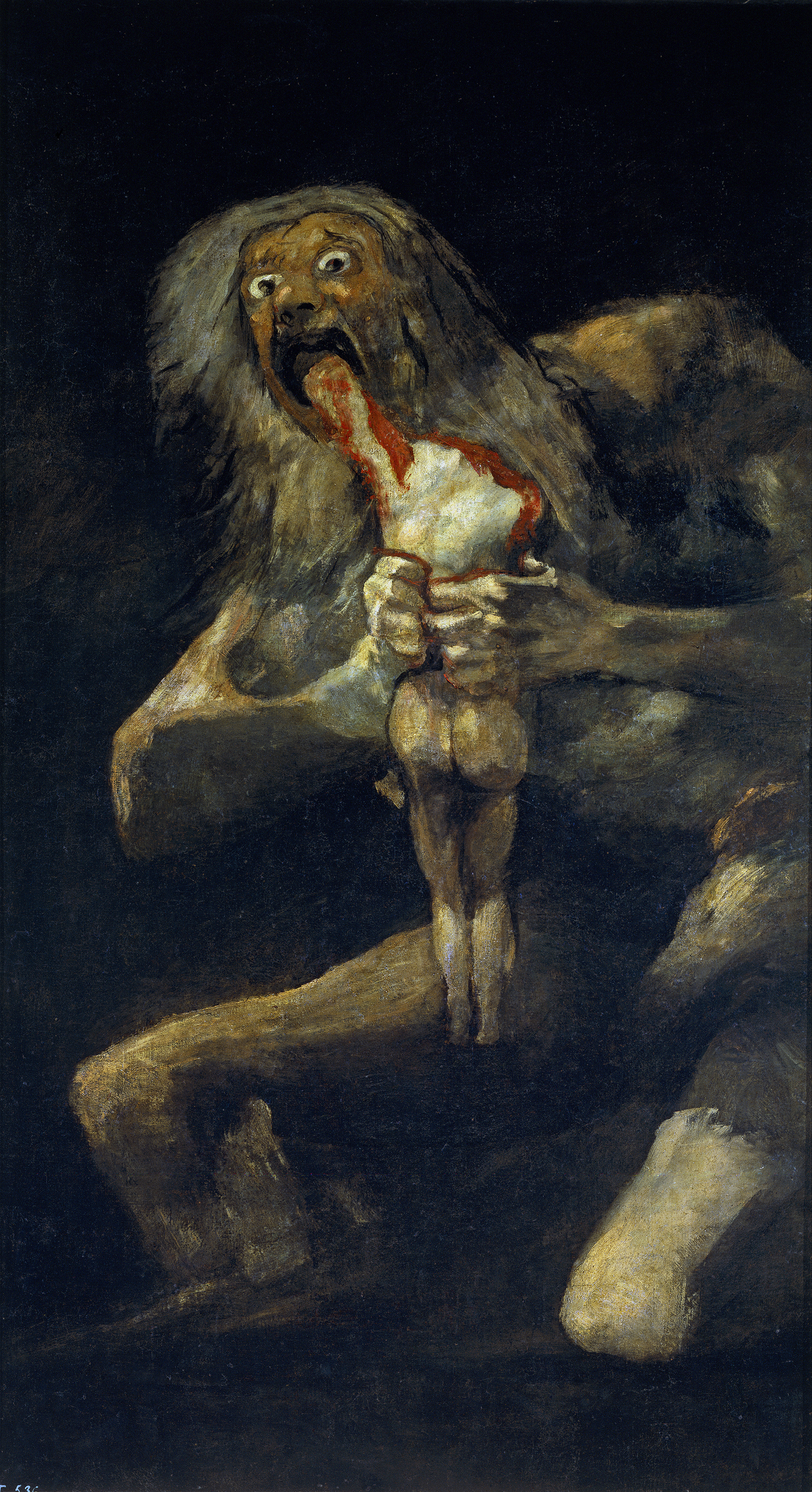
The film makes references to the Black Paintings.

Some references in the film are to Francisco de Goya's Black Paintings, as well as to Alfonso Ponce de León, somewhat alluding to the tragedy awaiting the protagonist.

Alana Mejía González debuted as cinematographer for the first time in a feature film.

The film was produced by Aquí y Allí Films, BTeam Prods, Magnética Films, Punto Nemo AIE, and Estonia's 34-T Cinema, with additional participation of TV3, RTVE, and Movistar Plus+.

Principal photography began on 27 May 2021 in Madrid and wrapped in July 2021. Filming also took place on locations in the Great Penedès area of Catalonia.

== Release ==
Manticore made its world premiere at the 47th Toronto International Film Festival, where it was screened in Contemporary World Cinema section on 13 September 2022. Later it was also screened at the Austin-based Fantastic Fest, the 66th BFI London Film Festival and the 55th Sitges Film Festival, as well as the 35th Tokyo International Film Festival.

Distributed in Spain by BTeam Pictures, the film was originally due to be released theatrically in Spanish cinemas on 4 November 2022. Release date was subsequently rescheduled to 9 December 2022. Film Factory Entertainment handled international sales.

== Reception ==
=== Critical response ===
On the review aggregator website Rotten Tomatoes, 100% of 8 critics' reviews are positive, with an average rating of 9.8/10.

Shelagh Rowan-Legg of ScreenAnarchy described Manticore as "brutal, unflinching, precise, and sensitive", adding that she could not but be in "equal parts horrified and mesmerized" with the story. Alfonso Rivera of Cineuropa pointed out that, notwithstanding possible objections from some viewers about an "amoral or scandalous" nature, the story manages to address the issue of "the need for affection that we all have", wondering if this is "the most brilliantly contrived and terrible love story in cinema today".

Raquel Hernández Luján of HobbyConsolas awarded the film 75 points ('good'), writing that Vermut delivers "a disconcerting film at times, suffocating at others, in which you never know what might happen and you are permanently on guard", and adding that a "very intelligent" mise-en-scène helps to "demonstrate that it is not necessary to be excessively explicit in order to enter into the most obsessive, deep and disconcerting corners of people".

Quim Casas of El Periódico de Catalunya rated the film 4 out of 5 stars, describing it as "a complex and problematic film, because what it talks about is always problematic", and as more than simply unsettling, "[an] uncomfortable, restive, and discomfort- and uneasiness-inducing [viewing]".

Manu Yáñez of Fotogramas rated the film 5 out of 5 stars, noting that Vermut reneges on the aesthetic pirouettes and narrative twists present in his previous films, and remarking on "the sobriety of the scenic and writing work". Daniel de Partearroyo of Cinemanía also gave Manticore a 5-star rating, describing the film as "a hair-raising character study grappling with taboo and horror at the blackness before one's own soul" and as Vermut's "most polished and daring film to date".

Giving the film another 5-star rating, Luis Martínez of El Mundo declared it to be "a prodigious film with a structure that is as simple as it is dense" and as the "consummation of a filmography now stripping itself of the juggling of [Vermut's] previous works".

Wendy Ide of ScreenDaily proclaimed the film to be "a provocative and intelligently handled picture which explores the impact of isolation and social dislocation on a troubled soul".

=== Top ten lists ===
Manticore appeared on a number of critics' Top Ten lists of the best films of 2022:

- 4th — El País (Eneko Ruiz Jiménez)
- 6th — El Confidencial (Marta Medina del Valle)
- 6th — Europa Press (Israel Arias)
- 6th — Cinemanía (Daniel de Partearroyo)
- 6th — TVG (Ángel Suanzes)
- 8th — Antena 3 (Gonzalo del Prado)
- 8th — Agencia EFE (Alicia García Arribas)
- 10th — Fotogramas (Juan Silvestre)

It was included amongst the 10 best European films of 2022:

- 1st — Cineuropa (Júlia Olmo)
- 2nd — Cineuropa (Alfonso Rivera)
- 4th — Cineuropa (Cristóbal Soage)
- 5th — Cineuropa (David González)

Several critics also included the film in their Top 10 lists of best Spanish films of 2022:

- 1st — El Cultural (Javier Yuste)
- 2nd — El Cultural (Carlos Reviriego)
- 2nd — Cadena SER (Pepa Blanes)
- 2nd — El Cultural (Manu Yáñez)
- 2nd — El Cultural (Juan Sardá)
- 3rd — El Periódico de Catalunya (critics)
- 3rd — El Confidencial (Marta Medina)
- 3rd — Cadena SER ('El cine en la SER' critics)
- 4th — Vanity Fair (Juan Sanguino & Paloma Rando)
- 4th — Cadena SER (Jose M. Romero)
- 5th — El Español ('Series&más' critics)
- 6th — El Mundo (Luis Martínez)
- 7th — ABC (Oti Rodríguez Marchante)
- 9th — El Cultural (Carlos Heredero)

=== Accolades ===
Award nominations for Manticore
Year	Award	Category	Nominee(s)	Result	Ref.
2022	28th Forqué Awards	Best Film Actor	Nacho Sánchez	Nominated	
2023	15th Gaudí Awards	Best Non-Catalan Language Film		Nominated	
2023	15th Gaudí Awards	Best New Performance	Zoe Stein	Nominated	
2023	15th Gaudí Awards	Best Cinematography	Alana Mejía González	Nominated	
2023	15th Gaudí Awards	Best Costume Design	Vinyet Escobar	Nominated	
2023	10th Feroz Awards	Best Main Actor in a Film	Nacho Sánchez	Won	
2023	10th Feroz Awards	Best Film Poster	Carlos Vermut	Won	
2023	10th Feroz Awards	Best Trailer	Miguel Ángel Trudu	Nominated	
2023	78th CEC Medals	Best Director	Carlos Vermut	Nominated	
2023	78th CEC Medals	Best Actor	Nacho Sánchez	Nominated	
2023	78th CEC Medals	Best New Actress	Zoe Stein	Nominated	
2023	37th Goya Awards	Best Director	Carlos Vermut	Nominated	
2023	37th Goya Awards	Best Original Screenplay	Carlos Vermut	Nominated	
2023	37th Goya Awards	Best Actor	Nacho Sánchez	Nominated	
2023	37th Goya Awards	Best New Actress	Zoe Stein	Nominated	
2023	28th Toulouse Spanish Film Festival	Golden Violet		Won	
2023	28th Toulouse Spanish Film Festival	Best Actor	Nacho Sánchez	Won	
2023	28th Toulouse Spanish Film Festival	Best Cinematography	Alana Mejía González	Won	

== See also ==
- List of Spanish films of 2022
