= An Island Away from You =

- Theatrical release poster
- Spanish: A una isla de ti
- Directed by: Alexis Morante
- Written by: Fernando Pérez; Paula López Cuervo
- Produced by: María Soler
- Starring: Freddie Dennis; Jaime Zatarain; Julia Martínez; Carlos González; Alba Goya; Toni Acosta
- Cinematography: Carlos García de Dios
- Edited by: Irene Blecua
- Music by: Lucas Vidal
- Production companies: Morena Films; Neo Labels Company; De Isla en Isla AIE
- Distributed by: DeAPlaneta
- Release dates: 10 March 2026 (Málaga); 10 April 2026 (Spain)
- Running time: 102 minutes
- Country: Spain
- Languages: Spanish; English

An Island Away From You (Spanish: A una isla de ti) is a 2026 Spanish romantic comedy film directed by Alexis Morante and written by Fernando Pérez and Paula López Cuervo. It stars Freddie Dennis, Jaime Zatarain, Julia Martínez, and Toni Acosta.

== Plot ==
After suffering heartbreak, uptight English chef Harry is persuaded by his friend Yaiza to holiday in Gran Canaria, where he falls for Iván, Yaiza's father.

== Cast ==
- Freddie Dennis
- Jaime Zatarain
- Julia Martínez
- Carlos González as Pichi
- Alba Goya
- Toni Acosta

== Production ==
The film is a De Isla en Isla AIE, Morena Films, and Neo Labels Company production, with the participation of HBO Max. It was shot in locations of the islands of Gran Canaria and Fuerteventura, including Agaete, the Maspalomas Dunes, and the Elder Museum.

== Release ==
The film was presented at the 29th Málaga Film Festival in March 2026 as an out of competition official selection entry. Distributed by DeAPlaneta, it is scheduled to be released theatrically in Spain on 10 April 2026. It was also programmed at the Florida-based OUTshine LGBTQ+ Film Festival.

== Reception ==
In a 2-star rating, Manuel J. Lombardo of Diario de Sevilla assessed that the screenplay seems to have been written with "a handbook of clichés and plot devices for old-fashioned madcap comedies in one hand, and the white paper on promoting tourism in the Canary Islands in the other".

== See also ==
- List of Spanish films of 2026
