= The Art of Return =

- Film poster
- Spanish: El arte de volver
- Directed by: Pedro Collantes
- Screenplay by: Pedro Collantes; Daniel Remón
- Produced by: Daniel Remón
- Starring: Macarena García; Nacho Sánchez; Ingrid García Jonsson; Mireia Oriol; Luka Peros; Lucía Juárez; Celso Bugallo
- Cinematography: Diego Cabezas
- Edited by: Pedro Collantes
- Music by: Yuri Méndez
- Production company: Tourmalet Films
- Distributed by: Filmax
- Release dates: 8 September 2020 (Venice); 11 December 2020 (Spain)
- Country: Spain
- Language: Spanish

The Art of Return (Spanish: El arte de volver) is a 2020 Spanish drama film directed by Pedro Collantes. It stars Macarena García alongside Nacho Sánchez, Ingrid García Jonsson, Mireia Oriol, Luka Peros, Lucía Juárez and Celso Bugallo.

== Plot ==
The plot tracks a young actress (Noemí) returning from New York to Spain to attend a potentially career-changing audition. Once in Madrid, she rethinks vital issues.

== Cast ==
- Macarena García as Noemí
- Nacho Sánchez as Carlos
- Ingrid García Jonsson as Ana
- Mireia Oriol as Laura
- Luka Peroš
- Lucía Juárez
- Celso Bugallo as Marcos

== Production ==
The screenplay was penned by Pedro Collantes and Daniel Remón. The film was developed under the Venice's Biennale College film workshop programme. Pedro Collantes was credited as film editor of his debut film, which was produced by Tourmalet Films. Diego Cabezas took over the cinematography whereas Yuri Méndez was responsible for the music.

== Release ==
The Art of Return was presented at the 77th Venice International Film Festival on 8 September 2020. It also screened at the Seville European Film Festival, the Hong Kong International Film Festival and the Transilvania International Film Festival. Distributed by Filmax, it was theatrically released in Spain on 11 December 2020.

== Reception ==
Miguel Ángel Pizarro of eCartelera ranked the film number 3 on the top ten Spanish films of 2020, considering that Macarena García offers one of the best performances of her career, and that the film is one of those hidden gems, to be delighted with because it is a discovery, a small miracle, one of those that leave a long aftertaste in the viewer.

Carlos Marañón of Cinemanía rated the film 3½ out of 5 stars, considering that even if the film goes round and round around the same idea, that circumstance, rather than a drawback, it reinforces the film's identity.

Mariona Borrull of Fotogramas rated the film 3 out of 5 stars, highlighting Macarena García's acting "muscle" as the best thing about the film while mentioning that the films "sometimes lacks a bit of punch" as the worst thing about it.

Sergi Sánchez of La Razón rated it 3 out of 5 stars, highlighting García's performance playing a character with whom it is not easy to empathize ("so Rohmerian in her self-deceptions and egoisms") as the best thing about the film, while citing the not-very-credible escene in the art gallery with García Jonsson as a negative point.

== Accolades ==
Year	Award	Category	Nominee(s)	Result	Ref.
2021	76h CEC Medals	Best New Director	Pedro Collantes	Nominated	
2021	8th Feroz Awards	Best Film Poster	Pablo Dávila, Espinar Gabriel	Nominated	

== See also ==
- List of Spanish films of 2020
