= Milo Quifes =

Spanish actor and writer

- Quifes in 2026
- Born: October 14, 2001 (age 25); Palos de la Frontera, Huelva, Spain
- Education: University of Granada
- Occupations: Actor and writer
- Notable work: La bola negra

José Antonio Quifes, professionally known as Milo Quifes (born 14 October 2001) (Note: His birth date was verified in an Instagram post dated October 14, 2024.) is a Spanish actor and writer who became internationally known for his role in the 2026 film La bola negra.

== Biography ==
José Antonio Quifes was born in Palos de la Frontera, Huelva on 14 October 2001 and grew up in Seville. At a young age, he was interested in literature and writing. He started studying biology at the University of Granada and began posting TikToks about his university life, eventually dropping out during his senior year in 2022. In 2024, he published Ultravioleta, his first novel, a romantic fiction about two men.

In 2026, he starred in the film La bola negra, directed by Javier Calvo and Javier Ambrossi, which was submitted by Academy of Cinematographic Arts and Sciences of Spain for the Academy Award for Best International Feature Film category in the 99th Academy Awards.
