= La piedra oscura =

Drama play by Alberto Conejero

- Original language: Spanish
- Written by: Alberto Conejero
- Genre: Drama
- Setting: 1937 Spain

Premiere
- Date: 14 January 2015
- Place: Teatro María Guerrero
- Directed by: Pablo Messiez

La piedra oscura is a drama play written by Alberto Conejero.

== Plot ==
The plot follows the tragic night in August 1937 during the Spanish Civil War involving a Republican lieutenant and an inexperienced National soldier.

== Characters ==
- Rafael Rodríguez Rapún (played by Daniel Grao in the original production)
- Sebastián (played by Nacho Sánchez in the original production)

== Production ==
Written by Alberto Conejero, the script was published in 2013. A production by La Zona and the Centro Dramático Nacional, the play premiered on 14 January 2015 at the Teatro María Guerrero under the stage direction of Pablo Messiez starring Daniel Grao and Nacho Sánchez.

== Accolades ==
Year	Award	Category	Nominee(s)	Result	Ref.
2016	25th Actors and Actresses Union Awards	Best New Actor	Nacho Sánchez	Won	
2016	19th Max Awards	Best Theatre Production		Won	
2016	19th Max Awards	Best Stage Direction	Pablo Messiez	Won	
2016	19th Max Awards	Best Playwright	Alberto Conejero	Won	
2016	19th Max Awards	Best Actor	Daniel Grao	Nominated	
2016	19th Max Awards	Best Stage Design	Elisa Sanz	Won	
2016	19th Max Awards	Best Lighting Design	Paloma Parra	Won	

== Adaptations ==
Plans for a film adaptation written by Conejero and Laura Belloso and directed by Fernando González Molina were reported in 2016. The play is a central inspiration for the 2026 film La bola negra, written by Conejero alongside Javier Ambrossi and Javier Calvo.
