= Alberto Conejero =

Spanish writer and playwright

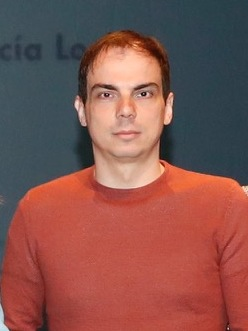
- Conejero in 2018
- Born: 8 July 1978 (age 48); Vilches, Spain
- Education: RESAD (Lic.); UCM (PhD)
- Occupations: Theatre director; dramatist and playwright; writer

Alberto Conejero (born 8 July 1978) is a Spanish playwright and writer.

== Early life and education ==
Conejero was born on 8 July 1978 in Vilches, province of Jaén. He earned a licentiate degree in stage direction and dramaturgy from the RESAD and a PhD in sciences of religions from the Complutense University of Madrid (UCM). His PhD dissertation was supervised by Pedro Bádenas de la Peña, and tackled Greek-Oriental urban music in the early 20th-century Ottoman Empire.

== Career ==
He is known for his play La piedra oscura about the life of football player Rafael Rodríguez Rapún and writer Federico García Lorca during the Spanish Civil War.

In May 2026, La bola negra, the movie he wrote with Javier Ambrossi and Javier Calvo was presented at the 2026 Cannes Film Festival.
