= 25th Actors and Actresses Union Awards =

2016 Spanish award ceremony

- Date: 14 March 2016
- Site: Circo Price, Madrid, Spain
- Hosted by: Ángel Ruiz
- Organized by: Actors and Actresses Union

Highlights
- Honorary career award: Juan Margallo

The 25th Actors and Actresses Union Awards ceremony was held on 14 March 2016 at the Circo Price in Madrid. The gala was hosted by Ángel Ruiz.

In addition to the competitive awards, Mabel Lozano received the 'Mujeres en Unión' award, Juan Margallo the 'A toda una vida' career award and Festival Una mirada diferente the Special Award.

== Winners and nominees ==
The winners and nominees are listed as follows:

=== Film ===
Best Male Performance in a Leading Role: Pedro Casablanc — B, la película; Ricardo Darín — Truman; Asier Etxeandia — The Bride	Best Female Performance in a Leading Role: Inma Cuesta — The Bride; Irene Escolar — An Autumn Without Berlin; Natalia de Molina — Food and Shelter
Best Male Performance in a Secondary Role: Felipe García Vélez — Nothing in Return; Javier Cámara — Truman; Carlos Álvarez-Nóvoa — The Bride	Best Female Performance in a Secondary Role: Luisa Gavasa — The Bride; Macarena García — Palm Trees in the Snow; Terele Pávez — Las aventuras de Moriana
Best Male Performance in a Minor Role: Manolo Solo — B, la película; Fernando Cayo — Retribution; José Sacristán — Vulcania	Best Female Performance in a Minor Role: Ana Fernández — The Bride; Alexandra Jiménez — Requirements to Be a Normal Person; María Alfonsa Rosso — The Bride

=== Television ===
Best Male Performance in a Leading Role: Nacho Fresneda — El ministerio del tiempo; Álvaro Cervantes — Carlos, rey emperador; Roberto Enríquez — Locked Up	Best Female Performance in a Leading Role: Maggie Civantos — Locked Up; Aura Garrido — El ministerio del tiempo; Najwa Nimri — Locked Up
Best Male Performance in a Secondary Role: Asier Etxeandia — Velvet; Eloy Azorín — Sin identidad; Jaime Blanch — El ministerio del tiempo	Best Female Performance in a Secondary Role: Susi Sánchez — Carlos, rey emperador; Alba Flores — Locked Up; Cecilia Freire — Velvet
Best Male Performance in a Minor Role: Ángel Ruiz — El ministerio del tiempo; Diego Martín — Velvet; Víctor Clavijo — El ministerio del tiempo	Best Female Performance in a Minor Role: Inma Cuevas — Locked Up; Marta Aledo — Locked Up; Nathalie Poza — Carlos, rey emperador

=== Theatre ===
Best Male Performance in a Leading Role: Daniel Grao — La piedra oscura; Ernesto Arias — Hedda Gabler; Rafa Castejón — Hambre, locura y genio	Best Female Performance in a Leading Role: Bárbara Lennie — Clôture de l'amour; Aitana Sánchez-Gijón — Medea; Ana Belén — Medea
Best Male Performance in a Secondary Role: Víctor Clavijo — Fausto; Alberto Velasco — Los nadadores nocturnos; Joaquín Notario — The Mayor of Zalamea	Best Female Performance in a Secondary Role: Ana Villa — The King's Speech; Consuelo Trujillo — Medea; Gracia Olayo — la llamada
Best Male Performance in a Minor Role: Chema Ruiz — Los hermanos Karámazov; Alberto San Juan — El rey; Unax Ugalde — Siempre me resistí a que terminara el verano	Best Female Performance in a Minor Role: Pilar Gómez — Cuando deje de llover; Ángela Villar — Cuando deje de llover; Estefanía de los Santos — Siempre me resistí a que terminara el verano

=== Newcomers ===
Best New Actor: Nacho Sánchez — La piedra oscura; Alberto López — Spanish Affair 2; Carlos Guerrero — Como si pasara un tren	Best New Actress: Berta Vázquez — Palm Trees in the Snow; Carmela Romero — Carne de gallina; Marina San José — Girl Gets Girl
