= Soledad Rosas =

Argentine anarchist (1974–1998)

- Born: María Soledad Rosas; 23 May 1974; Buenos Aires, Argentina
- Died: 11 July 1998 (aged 24); Bene Vagienna, Italy
- Other names: Sole

María Soledad Rosas (23 May 1974 – 11 July 1998) was an Argentine activist who was falsely charged with eco-terrorism in Italy. Soon after arriving in Turin in 1997, she became involved in the squatting movement, staying at a self-managed social centre named Asilo. She attended protests and lived as a squatter. In March 1998, she was arrested by Italian law enforcement, along with her boyfriend, Edoardo Massari, and Silvano Pelissero. They were accused of being affiliated with an organisation called Lupi Grigi (Grey Wolves) that authorities said had been sabotaging construction sites for the Treno Alta Velocità. The activists maintained their innocence but were branded eco-terrorists in the media. Massari hanged himself in his cell later that month. Rosas was released to house arrest and hanged herself on 11 July.

Rosas' death catalysed demonstrations from the anarchist community in Italy. Her story was recounted in the 2003 Martín Caparrós book Amor y anarquía, la vida urgente de Soledad Rosas. The 2018 film Soledad by Agustina Macri is also about Rosas.

== Early life and education ==
María Soledad Rosas was born on 23 May 1974 in Buenos Aires, Argentina. She was the second of two daughters of Marta Rey de Rosas and Luis Rosas, a descendent of Juan Manuel de Rosas. She attended the Río de la Plata school in Barrio Norte and rode horses at her family's farm in Pilar. She earned income as a dogwalker while she was in school. She attended the University of Belgrano, earning a degree in hotel management. She spoke five languages and was apolitical. Following her graduation, her parents purchased her a round-trip ticket to Europe.

== Trip to Italy ==
Rosas arrived in Italy in July 1997. She travelled with her friend Silvia Gramático around the country, arriving in Turin after a few days. Looking for a place to sleep, they found an anarchist self-managed social centre that directed them to the squat Asilo (Asylum). (Note: Asilo, or Asilo Occupato, was a self-managed anarchist project in Turin from 1995 until its eviction in February 2019.) Rosas was fascinated with the lifestyle of the squatters and became immersed in their community, adopting a vegetarian diet. Later in the autumn, she started a relationship with Italian anarchist Edoardo "Baleno" Massari. She married fellow anarchist Luca Bruno in order to obtain Italian citizenship. Rosas and Massari joined Silvano Pelissero in attending No TAV protests against the development of a high-speed rail project in the Alps. In October the three led the occupation of a new squat, in a building that formerly served as a morgue in the abandoned mental hospital in Collegno, on the outskirts of Turin. The operation was recorded by Italian police forces who had planted a listening device in a car belonging to Massari.

Rosas and Massari joined their friends in Spain for the final two weeks of 1997.

== Arrest, detention and death ==
A stretch for the Treno Alta Velocità high-speed rail network between Turin and Lyon crosses the Italian Alps' Susa Valley. Since 1996, construction of the rail has met opposition, from protests to direct action, with multiple incidents of infrastructure sabotage. Sixteen incidents of sabotage took place early in 1998.

In a raid on 5 March 1998, Rosas, Massari, and Pelissero were arrested by police from the Divisione Investigazioni Generali e Operazioni Speciali. They were charged with eco-terrorism, and accused of being involved with a paramilitary organisation called Lupi Grigi (Grey Wolves). Rosas was taken to a high-security prison.

On 28 March, Massari hanged himself using the bedsheet in his cell. After Rosas learned of his death, she started a hunger strike and addressed a message to her friends:

"Companions: rage dominates me at this moment. I have always thought that everyone is responsible for their actions, but this time the guilty are (...) those who killed Edo: the State, the judges, the lawyers, the press, the TAV, the police, the laws, the rules and the whole society of slaves that accepts this system.

After what happened, the politicians of the green party who came to give me their condolences and to reassure me could not think of anything better than to tell me that 'now surely everything will be solved faster, now everyone will follow the process with more attention and soon you will be under house arrest.'

I was speechless, but I was able to ask them if it takes the death of a person to move a piece of shit, in this case the judge."

— Soledad Rosas

Thousands of demonstrators in Italy protested her imprisonment. In widely published photographs, Rosas is shown with a shaved head and in handcuffs, giving the finger to the press as she is taken out of the Turin Palace of Justice by the Carabinieri.

Following Massari's death Rosas was released into house arrest in May and was transferred to Sottoiponti, a farm and facility for AIDS patients and addiction recovery in Bene Vagienna. She was visited by her family and her Italian friends. She insisted on her innocence and planned to remain in Italy. Unless the prosecution could make a strong case, Rosas and Pelissero were to be released on 5 September. Instead, on 6 July, the prosecution charged them with arson and theft.

Rosas hanged herself with a sheet on 11 July 1998. She was cremated and her remains were returned to Argentina in a silver urn.

== Aftermath ==
The incarceration and deaths of Massari and Rosas mobilised the Italian anarchist community. Rosas was considered a hero among squatters and became an icon of the Italian anarchist movement. Following the death of Rosas, letter bombs were sent to various officials.

The legal case against Rosas was marred by evidence tampering, including editing of the activists' conversations in an attempt to link them to the Grey Wolves group. An arsenal police alleged they had found in the Turin squat never materialised and it was proven that Rosas was not in the country when the arson attack occurred. Both Rosas and Massari were acquitted. Pelissero remained imprisoned until 2002 when the case was dropped due to inconsistencies in the evidence that was presented.

== In popular culture ==
Martín Caparrós wrote the 2003 book Amor y anarquía, la vida urgente de Soledad Rosas (Love and anarchy, the urgent life of Soledad Rosas) about Rosas. In the book, Caparrós reconstructs Rosas's life, drawing on her diaries and letters as well as conversations with her family and squatters from Italy.

The 2018 Argentine film Soledad by Agustina Macri, daughter of President Mauricio Macri, features Vera Spinetta as Rosas. The film was released alongside the Italian translation of Caparrós's book, both of which were boycotted by the Italian anarchist community. Soledad won the main prize at the BCN Film Fest.

The song "L'ultimo gesto di liberazione" by Argentine punk band She Devils has lyrics about a letter that Rosas wrote.
