= Seventeen (2019 film) =

Spanish drama film

- Film poster
- Spanish: Diecisiete
- Directed by: Daniel Sánchez Arévalo
- Written by: Daniel Sánchez Arévalo
- Starring: Biel Montoro; Nacho Sánchez
- Cinematography: Sergi Vilanova Claudín
- Edited by: Miguel Sanz
- Music by: Julio de la Rosa
- Production company: Atípica Films
- Distributed by: Netflix
- Release dates: September 27, 2019 (San Sebastián); October 4, 2019 (Spain)
- Country: Spain
- Language: Spanish

Seventeen (Spanish: Diecisiete) is a 2019 Spanish comedy-drama film directed by Daniel Sánchez Arévalo, written by Daniel Sánchez Arévalo and Araceli Sánchez and starring Biel Montoro and Nacho Sánchez. It also features Itsaso Arana and Kandido Uranga.

The film had its world premiere at the San Sebastián International Film Festival on September 27, 2019 and was released theatrically in Spain on October 4, 2019, before digital streaming on October 18, 2019, by Netflix.

== Plot summary ==
The plot revolves around 17-year-old Héctor, who runs away from the youth detention center he's been at for the last two years he was put in for stealing a scooter, an air heater for his grandmother, an electric shaver for himself, and giving a concussion to the security guard. He runs away to find the dog Oveja that he met at the youth detention center, which was later adopted. Héctor is accompanied by his older brother Ismael, who wants to ensure Héctor doesn't get into trouble, and his grandmother Cuca, who had a cerebrovascular accident, can only say Tarapara and will die very soon. Ismael is expecting a child, but had to leave the mother as he did not believe he was capable of taking care of it. In the end, Héctor finds Oveja, but decides to leave the dog to its new owner. He is then brought back to the youth detention center by Ismael, where they have a final emotional moment together.

== Cast ==
- Biel Montoro as Héctor
- Nacho Sánchez as Ismael
- Itsaso Arana as Esther
- Kandido Uranga as Cura
- Chani Martín as Primo Ignacio
- Mamen Duch as Jueza
- Lola Cordón as Cuca
- Jorge Cabrera as Profesor
- Iñigo Aranburu as Román
- Carolina Clemente as Prima Rosa
- Aaron Porras as Paisano

== Release ==
Seventeen had its premiere at the 67th San Sebastián International Film Festival on September 27, 2019. It was released in selected cinemas in Spain on October 4, 2019. It was released by digital streaming on October 18, 2019, by Netflix.

== See also ==
- List of Spanish films of 2019
