= Queer You Are =

Spanish comedy-drama TV series

- Spanish: Maricón perdido
- Genre: Autofiction; Comedy drama
- Created by: Bob Pop
- Screenplay by: Bob Pop
- Directed by: Alejandro Marín
- Starring: Gabriel Sánchez; Carlos González; Candela Peña; Alba Flores
- Composer: Nico Casal
- Country of origin: Spain
- Original language: Spanish
- No. of seasons: 1
- No. of episodes: 6

Production
- Executive producer: Berto Romero
- Production companies: El Terrat; WarnerMedia

Original release
- Network: TNT
- Release: 18 June – 25 June 2021

Queer You Are (Spanish: Maricón perdido; lit. 'Hopeless Faggot') is a Spanish television series created by Roberto Enríquez ("Bob Pop"), representing a partially fictionalized version of his personal experiences. Directed by Alejandro Marín, the six-episode series stars Gabriel Sánchez, Carlos González, Candela Peña and Alba Flores, among others. Produced by El Terrat, it premiered on TNT on 18 June 2021 and became available to HBO Max subscribers, with English subtitles, on 26 October 2021.

== Premise ==
Blending drama and comedy, the fiction is inspired by the life of the series' creator Roberto Enríquez (Bob Pop), intercutting events from his small-town youth as an overweight teenaged fan of musicals in the 1980s, with later experiences during his time as a university student in Madrid and his current life as a professional writer.

== Cast ==
- Gabriel Sánchez as Roberto Enríquez.
- Carlos González as Roberto Enríquez.
- Roberto Enríquez, "Bob Pop" as Roberto Enríquez.
- Candela Peña as Lucía, Roberto's mother.
- Carlos Bardem as Roberto's father.
- Alba Flores as Lola, Roberto's friend at university.
- Miguel Rellán as Roberto's grand father.
- Guillermo Toledo
- Marc Martínez
- Ramón Pujol
- Júlia Molins
- Daniel Bayona
- Michael Batista
- María Romanillos
- Roger Padilla
- Javier Bódalo
- Juan Olivares
- Sergi Gibert
- Berta Cascante
- Fernando Valdivielso

== Production and release ==
Created by Roberto Enríquez (Bob Pop), Maricón perdido was produced by El Terrat for WarnerMedia. Berto Romero is credited as executive producer. Written by Bob Pop, the full six episodes were directed by Alejandro Marín. Filming lasted from October 2020 to February 2021. It took place in between the province of Barcelona (Barcelona, El Prat de Llobregat, Castelldefels, Terrassa and Sant Vicenç de Montalt) and Madrid. On 28 April 2021, the release date of 18 June 2021 for the first three episodes was disclosed, with the last three scheduled for 25 June. It was pre-screened at the Málaga Film Festival.

== Episodes ==
Series	Episodes	Originally released			Ref.
Series	Episodes	First released	Last released	Network	Ref.
1	6	18 June 2021	25 June 2021	TNT	

No.	Title	Directed by	Written by	Original release date
1	"No llores por mí"	Alejandro Marín	Bob Pop	18 June 2021
2	"Retiro carnal"	Alejandro Marín	Bob Pop	18 June 2021
3	"Háblame de ti"	Alejandro Marín	Bob Pop	18 June 2021
4	"Manso"	Alejandro Marín	Bob Pop	25 June 2021
5	"Todo bien"	Alejandro Marín	Bob Pop	25 June 2021
6	"Recuerda"	Alejandro Marín	Bob Pop	25 June 2021

== Awards and nominations ==
Year	Award	Category	Nominee(s)	Result	Ref.
2021	68th Ondas Awards	Best Comedy Series		Won	
2021	27th Forqué Awards	Best Fiction Series		Nominated	
2022	9th Feroz Awards	Best Comedy Series		Nominated	
2022	9th Feroz Awards	Best Supporting Actor in a Series	Miguel Rellán	Nominated	
2022	9th Feroz Awards	Best Supporting Actress in a Series	Candela Peña	Nominated	
2022	33rd GLAAD Media Awards	Outstanding Spanish-Language Scripted Television Series		Won	
