= María Barrier =

Spanish podcaster

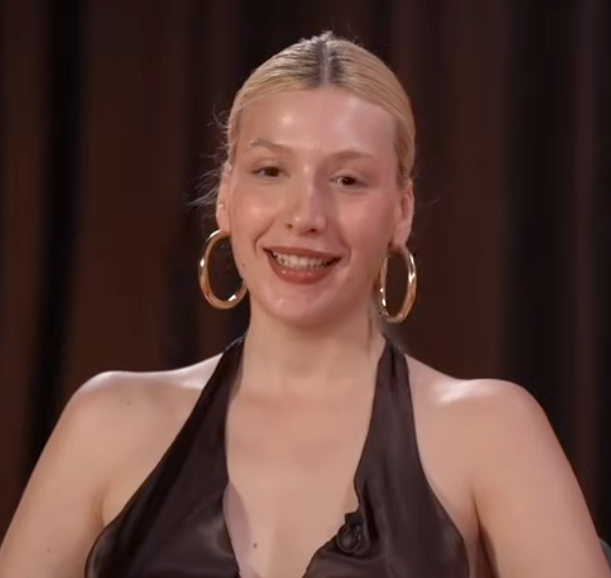
- Education: University of Barcelona
- Occupations: podcaster, journalist
- Partner: Bruna Lucadamo

María Barrier (born in Palma de Mallorca) is a podcaster, journalist and Internet personality from Spain. Together with Samantha Hudson, she presents the podcast Bimboficadas.

== Education ==
Barrier graduated from the University of Barcelona with a degree in Archeology and received a post-graduate degree in Digital Communication and Journalism.

== Career ==
The launch date for the first podcast of Bimboficadas, co-presented with Samantha Hudson, was announced through social media in November 2023. The podcast uses irony and irreverent humor to explore deeper topics such as job security, gender identity and mental health. The podcast is often improvised, though a rough outline is created when an episode includes a guest. Barrier and Hudson say about the format that "the key is spontaneity and naturalness".

On 7 August 2024, she was live recording an episode of the podcast with Hudson in a theater in Valencia. During filming, three men, each neo-Nazis and members of the Núcleo Nacional party, interrupted with derogatory insults targeting Hudson. Barrier kicked them out with the support of the rest of theatre attendees. Afterwards, Barrier reported the incident on social media. She described the men, all wearing black shirts and ski masks, entering the establishment after paying for their respective tickets. The incident was picked up by the national press and covered by news outlets such as Público, LaSexta and 20 minutos.

She was invited to attend the podcast Sabor a Queer, presented by film director David Velduque, in an episode that aired on 18 November 2024. On 28 November 2024, she participated in an open assembly with Mariona Pagès, Clara Sans and Leo Espluga as part of Bivac, a festival for youth thought.

As a journalist, she wrote for Acero and Metal Magazine.

== Personal life ==
Prior to the creation of the Bimboficadas podcast, Barrier and Samantha Hudson were friends in high school. Barrier supports anti-facisim and political lesbianism. She is openly neurodivergent. She is in a romantic relationship with Bruna Lucadamo, daughter of actress Aitana Sánchez-Gijón. Barrier identifies as a lesbian.
