= Laura Jou =

Catalan theater professor and director (born 1969)

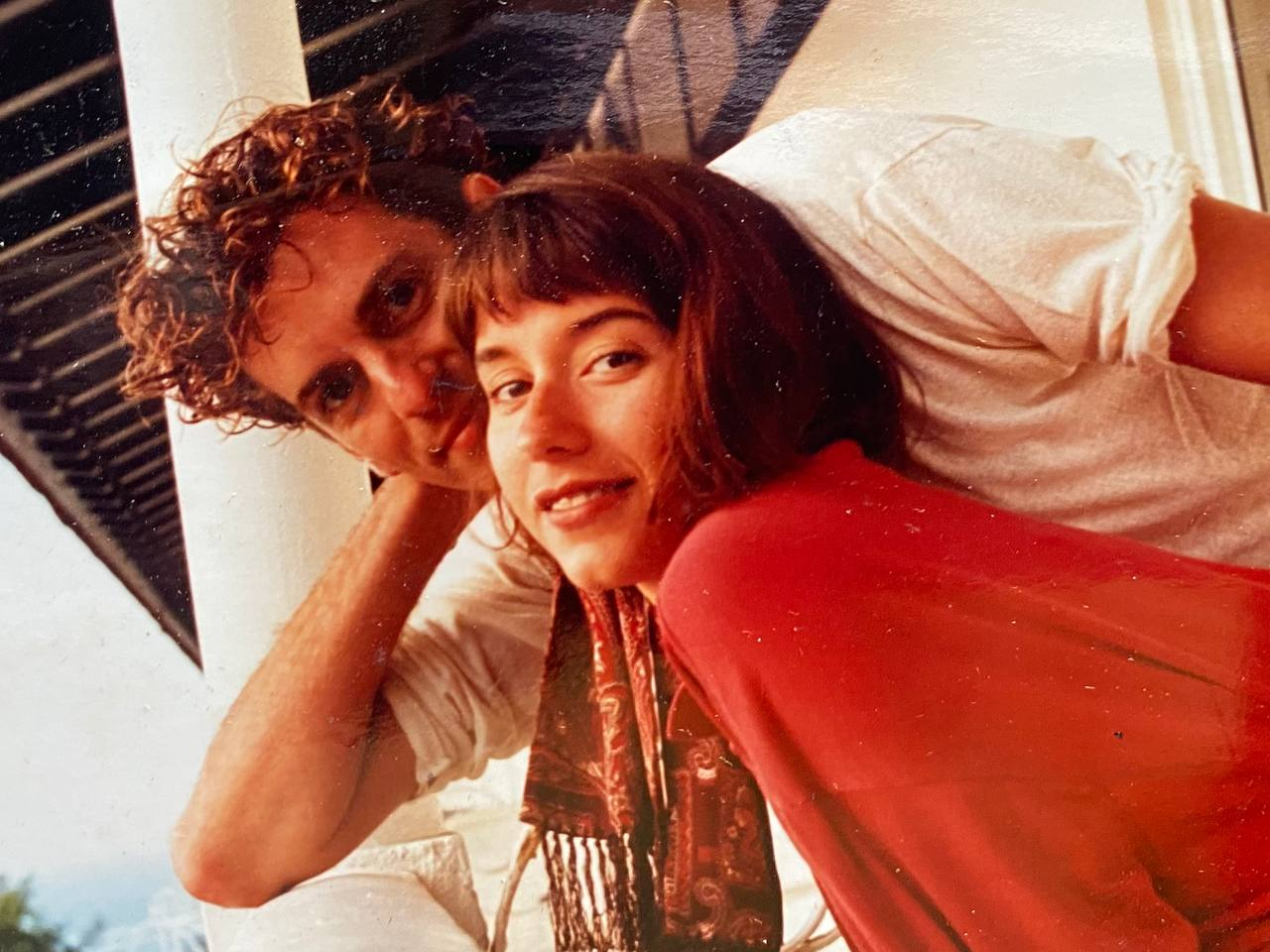
Laura Jou with Charles Sabater in 1995

Laura Jou i Bonet (born 14 March 1969 in Barcelona) is a Catalan professor of theater and director. She was trained as an actress at the Theater Institute of Barcelona. In the early 2000s, she began working as an advisor for child actors. This role led her to participate in 24 films and 18 series, including The Orphanage, Black Bread, Eva and The Impossible.

Jou is the mother of singer and YouTuber Roc Jou Morales, known professionally as Rojuu.

== Life Without Sara Amat ==
After presenting the short film No me quites at the 2016 Gaudí Awards, producer Isona Passola commissioned Jou's first film, Life Without Sara Amat. It was an adaptation of a novel of the same name by Pep Puig, which won the 2015 Premio Sant Jordi, a prize for novels written in the Catalan language. Jou directed the film alongside director of photography Gris Jordana and composer Pau Vallvé.

To find her main cast, Jou recruited former acting students of hers that starred in The Red Band Society and Merlí to recruit young actors via Instagram, and "20,000 children signed up." To prepare for their roles, the cast did two months of rehearsal, and became "a real gang, with real ties." They underwent exercises to understand the motivations of their characters and rehearsed scenes that were not in the script.

== Filmography ==
- 2015: No me quites
- 2019: Life Without Sara Amat
