= Edmond de Bries =

Spanish drag queen

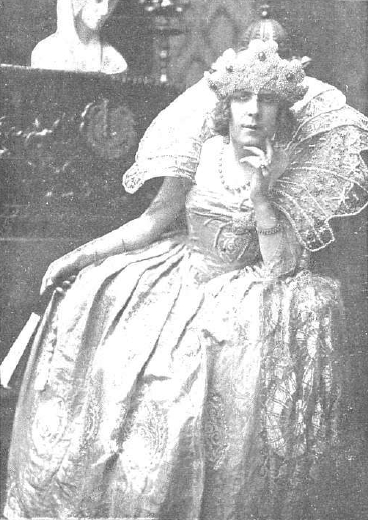
Edmond de Bries

Asensio Marsal Martínez (1897 – c.1936 or 1950), artistically known as Edmond de Bries or Egmont de Bries, was a Spanish female impersonator, actor, and cuplé singer, especially popular during the 1920s in Spain.

== Career ==
=== Early life ===
Asensio was born in Cartagena in 1897. Due to the death of his father, he began working at a young age, excelling in sewing. He worked as a dressmaker and tailor for cuplé singers and celebrities, gaining recognition and even being mentioned in Rafael Cansinos Assens’ memoir La novela de un literato (1911). During this period, he lived with his mother Isabel Martínez and his sister, the dancer and singer Magda de Bries, in a guesthouse on Relatores Street in Lavapiés.

At the age of fourteen, he witnessed a performance in his hometown by the impersonator Ernesto Foliers and later dressed up as him at a family gathering. The reception was so positive that he decided to pursue a career in theatre as a female impersonator during a time when the art form was gaining popularity in Spain. He debuted at the Teatro de la Encomienda in Lavapiés under the name Marsal, later using Salmar, and eventually adopting the stage name Edmond de Bries (sometimes written as "Egmont"), by which he became widely known.

=== Fame ===
In 1919, he performed before the Spanish royal family at the Victoria Eugenia Theatre in San Sebastián, and in 1920, he debuted at Teatro Fuencarral in Madrid, drawing over 2,500 spectators per show for four months. During these performances, he debuted the cuplé “Las tardes del Ritz”, written by Álvaro Retana, which became his most famous song. His fame continued to grow, sharing the stage with other impersonators such as Actis Eliu, Bella Dora, Ernesto Foliers, and his sister Magda. He also performed in cities like Paris. His shows involved imitations of singers like La Goya, Pastora Imperio, Fornarina, and La Chelito, utilizing lavish costumes and highly accurate mimicry. He was also known for his impersonations of Luisa Vila in the cuplé La Cocaína and Blanquita Suárez in La Marquesa del Trianón.

From 1924 onward, he began performing in countries in the Americas, such as Argentina, Venezuela, and Cuba, as well as in New York. After four years in America and amidst a decline in the popularity of cuplé, he returned to Madrid in March 1928 and performed again at Teatro Fuencarral and Teatro de La Latina. No biographical information is known about him after the outbreak of the Spanish Civil War, and it is believed he may have died during the war or in the 1950s.

In 2017, the book Orgullo travestido: Egmont de Bries y la repercusión social del transformismo en la España del primer tercio del siglo XX by researcher Juan Carlos Usó was published.

== Book ==
- Bonitos couplés por el mago del arte del vestido (1925)
