= Sara Torres =

Spanish writer (born 1991)

Sara Torres Rodríguez de Castro
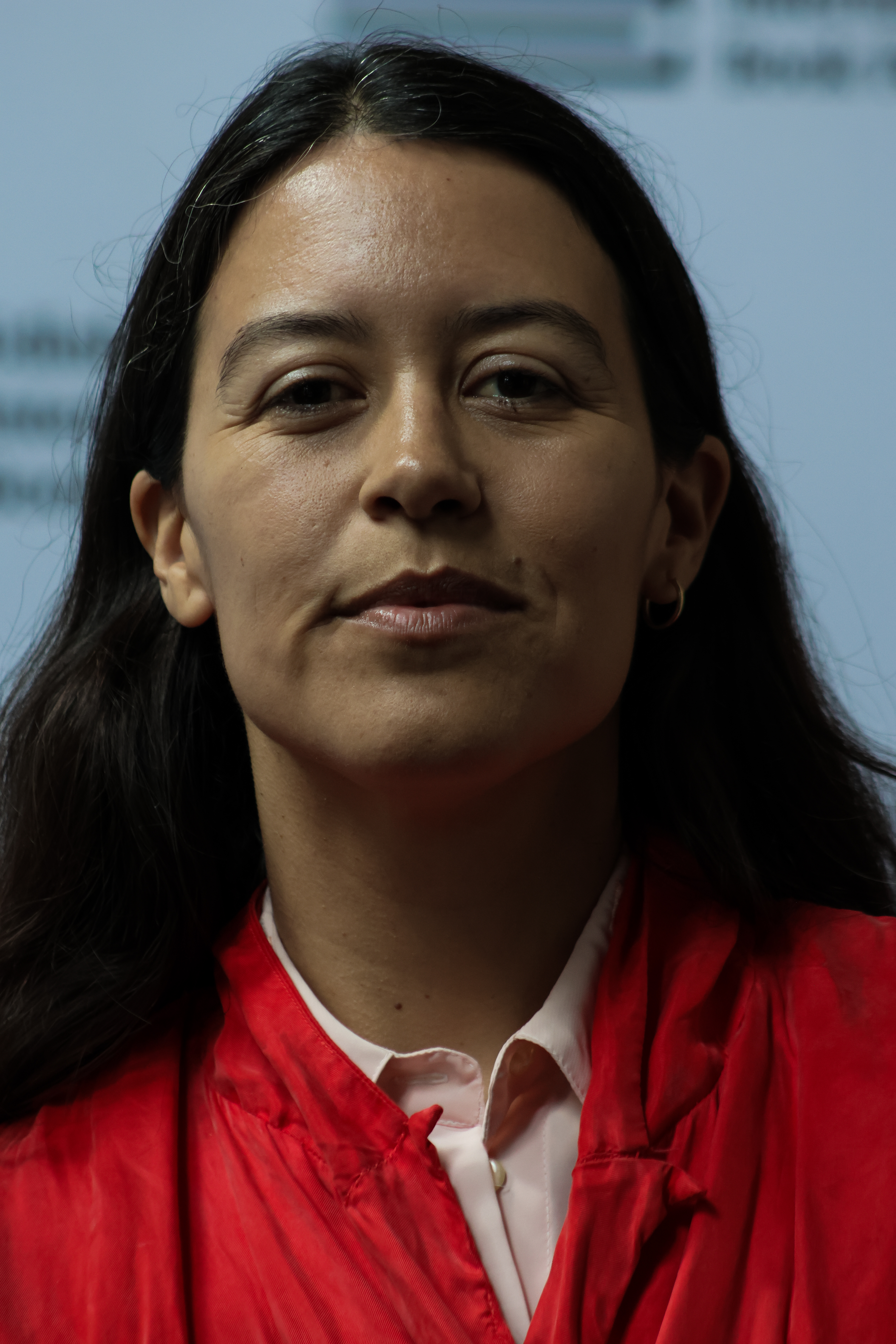
- Torres at Edinburgh International Book Festival 2026
- Born: 1991 (age 34–35); Gijón
- Occupations: Novelist; Poet; Writer

Sara Torres Rodríguez de Castro (Gijón, 1991) is a Spanish poet and novelist. In 2014, she won the Gloria Fuertes Prize for children's poetry. For her first novel, Lo que hay, she received the "Javier Morote" Award, awarded by CEGAL (Confederación Española de Gremios y Asociaciones de Libreros) (Spanish Confederation of Booksellers' Guilds and Associations), for the best new author in 2022. She is openly a lesbian and has discussed her experiences as a lesbian woman and her writing about love and desire between women in interviews and essays on lesbian identity.

== Education ==
She studied Spanish Language and Literature at the University of Oviedo. She received her PhD from Queen Mary University of London with the thesis The Lesbian Text: Fetish, Fantasy and Queer Becomings. Also in London, she completed an interdisciplinary master's degree at King's College London specializing in theories of textuality, psychoanalysis, queer studies, and feminism.

== Career ==
Torres has been a professor of cultural studies with a gender perspective at the Autonomous University of Barcelona. In 2022, she was the coordinator of the Poetry in Action cycle at the Carmen Thyssen Museum in Málaga.

As of 2022, she lives in Germany and works on a postdoctoral fellowship at the University of Passau, researching the writing that emerges after receiving a cancer diagnosis She also writes regularly for elDiario.es in the section Está bien sentir (It's okay to feel).

== Awards ==
- 2014, Premio Gloria Fuertes, XV edition, for La otra genealogía
- 2022, Premio Javier Morote, for Lo que hay

== Selected works ==
=== Books ===
- La otra genealogía. Torremozas, 2014
- Conjuros y cantos. Kriller71, 2016
- Phantasmagoria. La Bella Varsovia, 2019
- El ritual del baño. La Bella Varsovia, 2021
- Lo que hay. Reservoir Books, 2022. (Premio Javier Morote), 2022
- Deseo de perro. Letraversal, 2023
- La seducción. Reservoir Books, 2024

=== Collective work ===
- Querida Theresa. Comisura, 2022

=== Participation in anthologies ===
- Outra maneira de olhar (editors: Carlos Castillo Pais & Miguel Floriano) Ediçoes Colobri, Lisboa 2020.
