= BCN Film Fest =

Spanish film festival

- Location: Barcelona, Spain
- Founded: 2017; 9 years ago
- Artistic director: Conxita Casanovas

The Barcelona-Sant Jordi International Film Festival, or simply BCN Film Fest, is a film festival held annually in Barcelona, Catalonia, Spain. It usually takes place in April, around Saint George's Day.

The first festival edition took place on 21 April 2017 at Barcelona's Cines Verdi. The first two editions were directed by José María Aresté. In November 2018, RNE journalist Conxita Casanovas became the festival's artistic director. For the fourth edition in 2020, following the onset of the COVID-19 pandemic, the festival's traditional April dates were rescheduled to 25 June – 2 July.

== Winners ==
=== Best Film Award ===
Edition	Year	Film	Ref.
1st	2017	From the Land of the Moon	
2nd	2018	Mary Shelley	
3rd	2019	Soledad	
4th	2020	Hope Gap	
5th	2021	Small Country: An African Childhood	
6th	2022	The Conference	
7th	2023	Rebel	
8th	2024	Stormskerry Maja	
9th	2025	The Quiet Son	
10th	2026	Amrum	
