= 80th CEC Awards =

Spanish film awards

- Date: 3 February 2025
- Site: Palacio de la Prensa, Madrid, Spain
- Hosted by: Gabriela Andrada; Javier Herrera
- Organized by: Círculo de Escritores Cinematográficos

The 80th CEC Medals ceremony, presented by the Círculo de Escritores Cinematográficos, took place on 3 February 2025 at the Palacio de la Prensa in Madrid. The gala was hosted by Gabriela Andrada and Javier Herrera.

== Winners and nominees ==
The winners and nominees are listed as follows:

=== Film ===
Best Film: Undercover; The 47; The Red Virgin; Glimmers	Best Animation Film: Buffalo Kids; Black Butterflies; Dragonkeeper; Rock Bottom
Best Director: Arantxa Echevarría – Undercover; Marcel Barrena – The 47; Paula Ortiz – The Red Virgin; Pilar Palomero – Glimmers	Best New Director: Javier Macipe – The Blue Star; Sonia Méndez – As Neves; César F. Calvillo, Teresa Bellón – Idol Affair; Antón Álvarez – The Flamenco Guitar of Yerai Cortés; Paz Vega – Rita
Best Original Screenplay: Amèlia Mora, Arantxa Echevarría – Undercover; Alberto Marini, Marcel Barrena – The 47; Javier Macipe – The Blue Star; Clara Roquet, Eduard Sola – The Red Virgin	Best Adapted Screenplay: Pilar Palomero – Glimmers; Rodrigo Cortés – Escape; Álex Montoya, Joana M. Ortueta – La casa; Icíar Bollaín, Isa Campo – I'm Nevenka
Best Actor: Eduard Fernández – Marco, the Invented Truth; David Verdaguer – La casa; Eduard Fernández – The 47; Urko Olazabal – I'm Nevenka	Best Actress: Carolina Yuste – Undercover; Emma Vilarasau – A House on Fire; Najwa Nimri – The Red Virgin; Patricia López Arnaiz – Glimmers
Best Supporting Actor: Antonio de la Torre – Glimmers; Luis Tosar – Undercover; Enric Auquer – A House on Fire; Salva Reina – The 47	Best Supporting Actress: Aixa Villagrán – The Red Virgin; Clara Segura – The 47; Nausicaa Bonnín – Undercover; Bruna Cusí – The Blue Star
Best New Actor: Óscar Lasarte – May I Speak with the Enemy?; Cuti Carabajal – The Blue Star; Pepe Lorente – The Blue Star; Daniel Ibáñez – Saturn Return	Best New Actress: Lucía Veiga – I'm Nevenka; Mariela Carabajal – The Blue Star; Zoe Bonafonte – The 47; Marina Guerola – Glimmers
Best Cinematography: Pedro J. Márquez – The Red Virgin; Isaac Vila – The 47; Javier Salmones – Undercover; Daniela Cajías – Glimmers	Best Editing: Victoria Lammers – Undercover; Nacho Ruiz Capillas – The 47; Javier Macipe, Nacho Blasco – The Blue Star; Pablo Gómez Pan – The Red Virgin; Maialen Sarasua Oliden – Marco, the Invented Truth
Best Music: Antón Álvarez, Yerai Cortés – The Flamenco Guitar of Yerai Cortés; Alberto Iglesias – The Room Next Door; Fernando Velázquez – Undercover; Gille Galván, Juanma Latorre – The Red Virgin	Best Documentary Film: The Flamenco Guitar of Yerai Cortés; Hispanoamérica, canto de vida y esperanza; Marisol, llámame Pepa; Osorio Norte
Best Foreign Film: Perfect Days; Anora; Juror No. 2; The Zone of Interest

=== Series ===
Best Series: Querer; Cristóbal Balenciaga; Celeste; The New Years	Best Ensemble Cast in a Series: Querer; Bank Under Siege; Celeste; The Asunta Case; Las abogadas; The New Years

== Special awards ==
- Honorary Medal: Manuel Zarzo
- Medal for the Promotion of Cinema: DAMA
- Medal for the Journalistic Merit: Carlos Boyero
- Medal for the Literary Merit: Juan Cobos
- 'Platino Educa de la Solidaridad' Medal (Fiction): Jumping the Fence
- 'Platino Educa de la Solidaridad' Medal (non-Fiction): El método Farrer
