= 2025 Series Mania =

2025 television festival

- Location: Lille, France
- Founded: 2010
- Festival date: 21–28 March 2025
- Website: seriesmania.com/en

Series Mania
- 2026 2024

The 2025 Series Mania is a television festival that took place from 21 to 28 March 2025 in Lille, France. The festival opened with French drama series Carême and closed with the fifth season of crime-comedy series HPI.

The most prestigious award, Grand Prix, was presented to Spanish drama series Querer.

== Juries ==
The following juries were named for the festival.

=== International Competition ===
- Pamela Adlon, American actress, Jury President
- Victor Le Masne, French composer
- Ignacio Serricchio, Argentinian-American actor
- Minkie Spiro, British director
- Karin Viard, French actress

=== French Competition ===
- Francisco Ferreira, Portuguese journalist, Jury President
- Ariane Kandilaptis, Belgian journalist
- Héctor Llanos Martinez, Spanish journalist
- Emil L. Mohr, Swedish journalist
- Joanna Orzechowska-Bonis, Polish journalist

=== International Panorama ===
- Lola Lafon, French writer, Jury President
- Kārlis Arnolds Avots, Latvian actor
- Casey Baron, American programmer
- Marie Colomb, French actress
- Kate Harwood, British television producer

=== Short Forms Competition ===
- Camélia Jordana, French actress, Jury President
- Aaron Altaras, German actor
- Lisa Ambjörn, Swedish showrunner
- Julien Gaspar-Oliveri, French filmmaker
- Enora Hope, French actress

== Official selection ==
=== Opening and closing series ===
| Title | Original title | Creator(s) | Production countrie(s) | Network |
|---|---|---|---|---|
| Carême (opening series) | | Ian Kelly, Davide Serino | France | Apple TV+ |
| HPI (season 5) (closing series) | | Stéphane Carrié, Alice Chegaray-Breugnot, Nicolas Jean | France | TF1 |

=== International Competition ===
The following series were selected to compete:

| Title | Original title | Creator(s) | Production countrie(s) | Network |
|---|---|---|---|---|
| The Deal | | Jean-Stéphane Bron, Alice Winocour | Switzerland, France, Belgium, Luxembourg | RTS |
| Empathy | Empathie | Florence Longpre | Canada | Crave |
| Generations | Generationer | Anna Emma Haudal | Denmark | DR |
| The German | | Moshe Zonder, Assaf Gil, Ronit Weiss-Berkowitz | United States | Yes TV |
| Hal & Harper | | Cooper Raiff | United States | |
| Kabul | | Olivier Demangel, Thomas Finkielkraut, Joé Lavy | France, Germany, Belgium, Italy, Greece | France Télévisions |
| Long Bright River | | Nikki Toscano, Liz Moore | United States | Peacock |
| Mussolini: Son of the Century | M. Il figlio del secolo | —N/a | France, Italy | Sky Atlantic |
| Querer | | Alauda Ruiz de Azúa, Eduard Sola, Júlia de Paz | Spain | Movistar Plus+ |

=== French Competition ===
| Title | Original title | Creator(s) | Production countrie(s) | Network |
|---|---|---|---|---|
| 37 Seconds | 37 secondes | Anne Landois, Sophie Kovess-Brun | France | Arte |
| Annwyn – The Otherworld | Anaon | Bastien Dartois, Sylvain Caron, Elsa Vasseur | France | Prime Video, France Télévisions |
| Clean | | Claire Lemaréchal, Franck Philippon | France | M6 |
| Log Out | Intraçables | Ami Cohen, Raphaël Meyer | Switzerland, France | RTS |
| Reformed | Le sens des choses | Noé Debré, Benjamin Charbit | France | Max |
| The Rose Family | La famille rose | Tigran Rosine | France | Ciné+ OCS |

=== International Panorama ===
| Title | Original title | Creator(s) | Production countrie(s) | Network |
|---|---|---|---|---|
| At the End of the Night | در انتهای شب | Ida Panahandeh, Arsalan Amiri | Iran | Filmnet |
| Celeste | | Diego San José | Spain | Movistar Plus+ |
| The Danish Woman | Danska konan | Benedikt Erlingsson | Iceland, France | RÚV |
| Family Matters | 가족계획 | Kim Jung-min | South Korea | Coupang Play |
| A Life's Worth | | —N/a | Sweden, France | Viaplay |
| Putain | | Zwangere Guy, Frederik Daem | Belgium | Streamz |
| Raul Seixas: Let Me Sing | Raul Seixas: Eu sou | Paulo Morelli, Pedro Morelli | Brazil | Globoplay |
| Requiem for Selina | Rekviem for Selina | Emmeline Berglund | Norway | NRK |
| Reunion | | William Mager | United Kingdom | BBC |
| What It Feels Like for a Girl | | Paris Lees | United Kingdom | BBC |

=== Short Forms Competition ===
| Title | Original title | Creator(s) | Production countrie(s) | Network |
|---|---|---|---|---|
| Chef d'orchestre | | Stéphane Lafleur, Joseph Marchand | Canada | Ici TOU.TV |
| The Deep Dark Hole | Au fond du trou | Maxime Chamoux, Sylvain Gouverneur | France | Arte |
| El'Sardines | | —N/a | Algeria, France | Arte.tv, TV5MondePlus |
| Friendcast | | Raphaël Marriq | France | |
| Moonbird | | Adam Thompson, Nathan Maynard, Catherine Pettman | Australia | SBS |
| One of Us Is Trembling | En af os ryster | —N/a | Denmark | |
| T-Rex | | Louis-Philippe Vachon | Canada | Télé-Québec |
| Wingspan | | Pedro Harres | Germany | |

=== Special Screenings ===
| Title | Original title | Creator(s) | Production countrie(s) | Network |
|---|---|---|---|---|
| Asterix and Obelix: The Big Fight | Astérix & Obélix: Le Combat des Chefs | Alain Chabat | France | Netflix |
| Bref (season 2) | | Kyan Khojandi | France | Disney+ |
| Charmed (1998) | | Constance M. Burge | United States | The WB |
| The Costa-Gavras Century | Le Siècle de Costa-Gavras | Edwy Plenel, Yannick Kergoat | France | |
| Fag Hag | Mariliendre | Javier Ferreiro | Spain | Atresplayer |
| Fighter | | Sunniva Sundby, Mari Bakke Riise | Norway | TV 2 Direkte |
| Ghosts | Ghosts : Fantômes en héritage | —N/a | France | Disney+, TF1 |
| Los Años Nuevos | | Sara Cano, Paula Fabra, Rodrigo Sorogoyen | France, Spain | Movistar Plus+ |
| The Nanny (1993) | | Peter Marc Jacobson, Fran Drescher | United States | CBS |
| Parlement (season 4) | Parliement | Noé Debré | France, Belgium, Germany | France Télévisions |
| Small Town, Big Story | | Chris O'Dowd | United Kingdom | Sky Atlantic, Sky Max |
| State of Alert | Menace Imminente | Leora Kamenetzky, David Dusa, Négar Djavadi | France | TF1 |
| Twin Peaks (1990) | | Mark Frost, David Lynch | United States | ABC |
Regional Screenings
| Alma | | Maud Carpentier, Fred Castadot, François Touwaide | Belgium | RTBF |
| Twin Peaks: Fire Walk with Me (1992) | | David Lynch | United States | |

== Awards ==
The following awards were presented at the festival:

=== International Competition ===
- Grand Prix: Querer
- Best Actress: Lili Reinhart for Hal & Harper
- Best Actor: Luca Marinelli for Mussolini: Son of the Century
- Best Writing: The German
  - Special Mention – Writing: The Deal

=== French Competition ===
- Best Series: 37 Seconds
- Best Actress: Elsa Guedj for Reformed
- Best Actor: Arthur Dupont for The Rose Family
- Best Original Score: Log Out

=== International Panorama ===
- Best Series: Celeste
- Best Actress: Carmen Machi for Celeste
- Best Actor: Matthew Gurney for Reunion
- Best Directing: At the End of the Night
- Student Award: Requiem for Selina
- Special Mention: Putain

=== Short Forms Competition ===
- Best Series: One of Us Is Trembling
- High School Students from the Hauts-de-France Region Award: Wingspan
- Special Mention: El'Sardines

=== Audience Award ===
- Audience Award: Empathy
