= 12th Feroz Awards =

Spanish film and television awards

- Date: 25 January 2025
- Site: Pontevedra Exhibition Centre, Pontevedra, Spain
- Hosted by: La Dani
- Organized by: Asociación de Informadores Cinematográficos de España

Highlights
- Most awards: Film: A House on Fire (3); Television: Querer (3)
- Most nominations: Film: A House on Fire (8); Television: Querer (7)

Television coverage
- Network: La 2; RTVE Play
- Viewership: 0.33 million (3.1%)

The 12th Feroz Awards ceremony, presented by the Asociación de Informadores Cinematográficos de España (AICE), took place on 25 January 2025 at the Pontevedra Exhibition Centre. The gala was hosted by La Dani and broadcast on La 2 and RTVE Play.

In the film categories, Dani de la Orden's A House on Fire received the most nominations with eight, followed by Glimmers, The Red Virgin and The Room Next Door, with six each. Movistar Plus+ series Querer led the nominations with seven nominations.

In the film categories, A House on Fire won the most awards, with three. In the television categories, Querer won the most awards, with three.

== Background ==
On 28 September 2024, AICE announced La Dani as the gala host. On 8 November 2024, filmmaker Jaime Chávarri was announced as the recipient of the Honorary Feroz Award. The nominations were announced by Álvaro Rico and Clara Galle on 28 November 2024. The nominations for the honorific Arrebato awards were announced on 12 December 2024.

Broadcast on La 2, the ceremony had 327,000 viewers on linear television (3.11% audience share).

== Winners and nominees ==
The winners and nominees are listed as follows:

=== Film ===
| Best Drama Film: Salve Maria; produced by Sergi Casamitjana, María Zamora; The Blue Star; produced by Simón de Santiago, Amelia Hernández Causapé, Hernán Musaluppi; The Room Next Door; produced by Agustín Almodóvar, Esther García; The Red Virgin; produced by María Zamora, Stefan Schmitz; Glimmers; produced by Fernando Bovaira, Valérie Delpierre, Simón de Santiago | Best Comedy Film: A House on Fire; produced by Toni Carrizosa, Alberto Aranda, Ana Eiras, Dani de la Orden; Still Life with Ghosts; produced by Alejandra Mora, Alicia Yubero, Juan Cavestany, Álvaro F. Armero; Idol Affair; produced by Beatriz Bodegas; Escape; produced by Rodrigo Cortés, Adrián Guerra, Núria Valls; The Other Way Around; produced by Javier Lafuente, Jonás Trueba |
| Best Director: Pedro Almodóvar — The Room Next Door; Arantxa Echevarría — Undercover; Dani de la Orden — A House on Fire; Paula Ortiz — The Red Virgin; Pilar Palomero — Glimmers | Best Screenplay in a Film: Eduard Sola — A House on Fire; Marcel Barrena, Beto Marini — The 47; Javier Macipe — The Blue Star; Pedro Almodóvar — The Room Next Door; Eduard Sola, Clara Roquet — The Red Virgin |
| Best Main Actor in a Film: Eduard Fernández — Marco, the Invented Truth as Enric Marco; Pepe Lorente — The Blue Star as Mauricio Aznar; Urko Olazabal — I'm Nevenka as Ismael Álvarez; Antonio de la Torre — Glimmers as Ramón; David Verdaguer — La casa as José | Best Main Actress in a Film: Emma Vilarasau — A House on Fire as Montse; Patricia López Arnaiz — Glimmers as Isabel; Najwa Nimri — The Red Virgin as Aurora; Laura Weissmahr — Salve Maria as Maria Agirre; Carolina Yuste — Undercover as Mónica / Arantxa |
| Best Supporting Actor in a Film: Óscar de la Fuente — La casa as Vicente; Enric Auquer — A House on Fire as David; Julián López — Glimmers as Nacho; José Sacristán — Escape as Judge; Alberto San Juan — A House on Fire as Carlos | Best Supporting Actress in a Film: Clara Segura — The 47 as Carmen; Anna Castillo — Escape as Abril; Marina Guerola — Glimmers as Madalen; Maria Rodríguez Soto — A House on Fire as Júlia; Aixa Villagrán — The Red Virgin as Macarena |
| Best Original Soundtrack: Alberto Iglesias — The Room Next Door; Arnau Bataller — The 47; Fernando Velázquez — La casa; Maria Arnal — They Will Be Dust; Zeltia Montes — Salve Maria | Best Trailer: Miguel Ángel Trudu — They Will Be Dust; Alberto Leal — The Room Next Door; Javier Morales — Undercover; Omar Bermúdez, Carlos Berot — Marco, the Invented Truth; Marta Longás, Jesús Fernández García — The Red Virgin |
Best Film Poster: Octavio Terol, Lluís Tudela — Salve Maria; Jordi Rins — A House on Fire; Laura Pere — The Blue Star; Juan Gatti, Nico Bustos — The Room Next Door; Emilio Lorente, Lluís Tudela — They Will Be Dust

==== Films with multiple nominations and awards ====
Films with multiple nominations
| Nominations | Film |
|---|---|
| 8 | A House on Fire |
| 6 | Glimmers |
| 6 | The Red Virgin |
| 6 | The Room Next Door |
| 4 | The Blue Star |
| 4 | Salve Maria |
| 3 | La casa |
| 3 | The 47 |
| 3 | Undercover |
| 3 | Escape |
| 3 | They Will Be Dust |
| 2 | Marco, the Invented Truth |

Films with multiple awards
| Awards | Film |
|---|---|
| 3 | A House on Fire |
| 2 | Salve Maria |
| 2 | The Room Next Door |

=== Television ===
| Best Drama Series: Querer; produced by Susana Herreras, Fran Araújo, Juan Moreno, Koldo Zuazua (Movistar Plus+); The New Years; produced by Domingo Corral, Fran Araújo, Nacho Lavilla, Eduardo Villanueva (Movistar Plus+); Cristóbal Balenciaga; produced by Xabi Berzosa, Sofía Fábregas (Disney+); See You in Another Life; produced by Jorge Sánchez-Cabezudo, Alberto Sánchez-Cabezudo, Sofía Fábregas, Koldo Zuazua (Disney+); I, Addict; produced by Sofía Fábregas, Aitor Gabilondo, Laura Rubirola, Javier Giner (Disney+) | Best Comedy Series: Celeste; produced by Fran Araújo, Javier Méndez, Alejandro Flórez, Diego San José (Movistar Plus+); Mamen Mayo; produced by Adrian Guerra, Núria Valls, Miguel Ángel Faura, Eduard Sola (SkyShowtime); Muertos S.L.; produced by Susana Herreras, Alberto Caballero (Movistar Plus+); Medina, el estafador de famosos; produced by Jorge Ponce, Ricardo Castella, Lydia Cerrudo, Xen Subirats (Prime Video) |
| Best Main Actor in a Series: Oriol Pla — I, Addict as Javier Giner; Francesco Carril — The New Years as Óscar; Pedro Casablanc — Querer as Íñigo Gorosmendi; Tristán Ulloa — The Asunta Case as Alfonso Basterra; Alberto San Juan — Cristóbal Balenciaga as Cristóbal Balenciaga | Best Main Actress in a Series: Nagore Aranburu — Querer as Miren Torres; Mónica López — Rapa as Maite Estévez; Carmen Machi — Celeste as Sara Santano; Candela Peña — The Asunta Case as Rosario Porto; Iria del Río — The New Years as Ana |
| Best Supporting Actor in a Series: Pol López — See You in Another Life as Emilio Trashorras; Miguel Bernardeau — Querer as Aitor; Javier Gutiérrez — The Asunta Case as Judge Malvar; Iván Pellicer — Querer as Jon; Manolo Solo — Celeste as Tony | Best Supporting Actress in a Series: Nora Navas — I, Addict as Anais López; Tamara Casellas — See You in Another Life as Baby's mother; María León — The Asunta Case as Cristina Cruces; Loreto Mauleón — Querer as Paula; Clara Sans — Celeste as Dani |
Best Screenplay in a Series: Alauda Ruiz de Azúa, Eduard Sola, Júlia de Paz — Querer; Diego San José, Daniel Castro, Oriol Puig — Celeste; Rodrigo Sorogoyen, Sara Cano, Paula Fabra, Marina Rodríguez Colás, Antonio Rojano — The New Years; Jorge Sánchez-Cabezudo, Alberto Sánchez-Cabezudo, Pablo Remón, Daniel Remón, Roberto Martín Maiztegui, Guillermo Chapa — See You in Another Life; Javier Giner, Aitor Gabilondo, Jorge Gil, Alba Carballal — I, Addict

==== Series with multiple nominations and awards ====
Series with multiple nominations
| Nominations | Series |
|---|---|
| 7 | Querer |
| 5 | Celeste |
| 4 | The New Years |
| 4 | See You in Another Life |
| 4 | The Asunta Case |
| 4 | I, Addict |
| 2 | Cristóbal Balenciaga |

Series with multiple awards
| Awards | Series |
|---|---|
| 3 | Querer |
| 2 | I, Addict |

=== Honorific awards ===
Honorary Feroz Award: Jaime Chávarri
| 'Arrebato' Special Award (Fiction): They Will Be Dust; Close to the Sultan; On the Go; As Silence Passes By; A Bright Sun | 'Arrebato' Special Award (non-Fiction): The Human Hibernation; Resistance Reels; The Undergrowth; Saturno; Zinzindurrunkarratz |
