= 8th ALMA Awards (Spain) =

- Date: 9 April 2025
- Venue: Cine Capitol, Madrid, Spain
- Presented by: ALMA
- Hosted by: Yaiza Nuevo; Javi Valera

The 8th ALMA Awards ceremony, presented by ALMA, the screenwriters' union of Spain, took place on 9 April 2025 at the Cine Capitol in Madrid. The gala was hosted by Yaiza Nuevo and Javi Valera.

Labor lawyer Tomás Rosón was announced in advance as the recipient of the ALMA Honorary Award, that was delivered to Rosón by ALMA president Carlos Molinero and by Manuela Carmena.

== Winners and nominees ==
The winners and nominees are listed as follows:

Best Screenplay in a Feature Film (Drama): Javier Macipe — The Blue Star; Arantxa Echevarría, Amèlia Mora ― Undercover; Marcel Barrena, Alberto Marini ― The 47	Best Screenplay in a Feature Film (Comedy): Eduard Sola ― A House on Fire; Teresa Bellón, César F. Calvillo ― Idol Affair; Itsaso Arana, Vito Sanz, Jonás Trueba ― The Other Way Around
Best Screenplay in a Series (Drama): Júlia de Paz, Alauda Ruiz de Azúa, Eduard Sola ― Querer; Sara Cano, Paula Fabra, Rodrigo Sorogoyen, Marina Rodríguez Colás, Antonio Rojano ― The New Years; Alberto Sánchez-Cabezudo, Jorge Sánchez-Cabezudo, Guillermo Chapa, Roberto Martín Maiztegui, Daniel Remón, Pablo Remón ― See You in Another Life	Best Screenplay in a Series (Comedy): Diego San José, Daniel Castro, Oriol Puig ― Celeste; Araceli Álvarez de Sotomayor, Alberto Caballero, Laura Caballero, Daniel Deorador, Carla Nigra ― Alpha Males; Nando Abad, Araceli Álvarez de Sotomayor, Alberto Caballero, Daniel Deorador, Julián Sastre ― Death Inc.
Best Screenplay in a Feature Film (Documentary): Blanca Torres ― Marisol, llámame Pepa; Antón Álvarez ― The Flamenco Guitar of Yerai Cortés; Robert Bahar, Almudena Carracedo ― No estás sola: la lucha contra La Manada	Best Screenplay in a Series (Documentary): Borja Glez. Santaolalla, Rubén Ajaú, Laura Márquez ― Medina: el estafador de famosos; Carles Tamayo, Ramón Campos ― Cómo cazar a un monstruo; Adolfo Moreno, Tomás Ocaña Urwitz, Elisa Botticella, Antonio Díaz Pérez, Sara Molina León ― Pícaro: el pequeño Nicolás
Best Screenplay in a Daily Series: Ángel Turlán, Pablo Fajardo, Tirso Conde, Aitor Santos, Mario Albelo, Beatriz Arias, Eva Baeza, Ana Boyero, Nuria Cabello, Paco de Campos, Beatriz Esos, Sergio Guardado, Denis L. Horro, Raquel Martín, David Muñoz, Ángela Obón, Maite Pérez Astorga, Juan Salvador López, Diego Soto, Álvaro Velasco ― 4 estrellas; Ruth García, Carmen Llano, Susana Prieto, Álvaro Bermúdez de Castro, Miguel Bueno, Christian Escamilla, Rafa Gallego, Moisés Gómez, Alberto Grondona, Félix J. Velando, Juanma Ruiz de Córdoba, Benjamín Zafra ― La Promesa; Carlos Martín, Joaquín Santamaría, Miquel Peidro, Ángela Armero, Sergio Barrejón, Juan Manuel Beiro, Remedios Crespo, José Ángel Domínguez Martel, Covadonga Espeso, Ignasi García Barba, José Antonio López Fuentes, Neus Peidro, Ernesto Pozuelo, Ignasi Rubio ― La Moderna	Best Screenplay in a Show: Diego Fabiano, Manuel Álvarez, Elena Beltrán, Danny Boy-Rivera, Miguel Campos, Yunez Chaib, Xavi Daura, Javier Díaz-Pinés, Sandra Flores, Helena Pozuelo, Iggy Rubín, Javi Valera ― La Revuelta; Alejandro Alcaraz, Mario de la Mano, Nacho G. Hermosura, Pablo González Batista, Manuel Martínez March, Toño Pérez, Jero Rodríguez, Luis Troquel, Antonio Vicente ― Cachitos de hierro y cromo; Marta Delcor, Marc Giró, Anna-Priscila Magriñà, Sergi Pons, Beatriz Requena, Pau Roigé, Miquel Sabe ― Late Xou
Best Screenplay in a Game Show: Pablo Corbacho, Laura Figueredo, Mikel Gómez, Aitor Ormaetxea, Emese Sobrino ― Cifras y letras; Raquel Buigues, Joserra Fudio, Gustavo García, Lluís Mosquera, Jose Ovejas ― Drag Race España; Sara López, Ivar Muñoz-Rojas, Diana Aller, Miguel Ángel Gómez, Cristina Palacios, Daniel Ródenas, Santiago Sánchez ― El cazador; Lourdes Alegre, Aram Bonmatí, Arnau Creus, Carmen Fernández, Jesús Martínez, Pepa Maymó, Ramón Micó, Marc Montañés, Marina Ortuño, Albert París, Marisa Pérez, Mireia Pou, Júlia Puig, Mireia Uribesalgo ― Saber y ganar
