= 30th Forqué Awards =

2024 Spanish film and television awards

- Date: 14 December 2024
- Site: IFEMA Palacio Municipal, Madrid, Spain
- Hosted by: Elena S. Sánchez
- Organized by: EGEDA

Television coverage
- Network: La 2, RTVE Play

The 30th Forqué Awards, organised by EGEDA, were presented on 14 December 2024 at the IFEMA Palacio Municipal in Madrid. The ceremony was broadcast on La 2 and RTVE Play.

== Background ==
In October 2024, filmmaker José Luis Garci was announced as the recipient of the EGEDA Gold Medal. The nominations were disclosed on 7 November 2024. The gala will be hosted by Elena S. Sánchez. Diana Navarro, María Toledo, and Sole Giménez were announced as musical acts.

== Winners and nominations ==
The winners and nominees are listed as follows:

Best Fiction Film: The 47; The Blue Star; Saturn Return; Undercover	Best Fiction Series: Querer; Las abogadas; Cristóbal Balenciaga; The Asunta Case
Best Male Performance in a Film: Eduard Fernández — Marco, the Invented Truth; Antonio de la Torre — Glimmers; Mario Casas — Escape; Pepe Lorente — The Blue Star	Best Female Performance in a Film: Carolina Yuste — Undercover; Emma Vilarasau — A House on Fire; Najwa Nimri — The Red Virgin; Patricia López Arnaiz — Glimmers
Best Male Performance in a Series: Pedro Casablanc — Querer; Alberto San Juan — Cristóbal Balenciaga; Oriol Pla — I, Addict; Javier Cámara — Rapa (S3)	Best Female Performance in a Series: Nagore Aranburu — Querer; Carmen Machi — Celeste; Candela Peña — The Asunta Case; Iria del Río — The New Years
Best Documentary Film: Marisol, llámame Pepa; Chaplin. Espíritu gitano; The Flamenco Guitar of Yerai Cortés; Mi hermano Alí	Best Latin-American Film: In Her Place; The Dog Thief; Kill the Jockey; Memories of a Burning Body
Best Short Film: La gran obra; Betiko Gaua; Evanescente	Best Animation Film: Black Butterflies; Buffalo Kids; Dragonkeeper; Rock Bottom
Cinema and Education in Values: The 47; The Blue Star; Undercover; I'm Nevenka

=== Audience Award ===
A House on Fire obtained the Audience Award.
