= Mamen Mayo =

- Promotional release poster
- Genre: Comedy-drama
- Created by: Eduard Sola
- Directed by: Miguel Ángel Faura; Oriol Pérez Alcaraz; Carmen Aumedes
- Starring: Silvia Abril; Pablo Capuz; Mona Martínez; Clara Sans
- Country of origin: Spain
- Original language: Spanish
- No. of seasons: 1
- No. of episodes: 8

Production
- Production company: Nostromo Pictures

Original release
- Network: SkyShowtime
- Release: 18 November 2024

Mamen Mayo is a Spanish comedy-drama television series created by Eduard Sola which stars Silvia Abril as the titular character. It premiered on SkyShowtime on 18 November 2024.

== Plot ==
The plot follows the mishaps of Mamen Mayo, a mediator in inheritance disputes.

== Cast ==
- Silvia Abril as Mamen Mayo
- Pablo Capuz as David Faura
- Mona Martínez as Sebastiana
- Clara Sans as Clara Codina
- Toni Acosta as Rebeca Mayo
- Óscar de la Fuente
- Javier Pereira
- Francisco Reyes

== Production ==
The series is a Nostromo Pictures production.

== Release ==
Mamen Mayo was made available on SkyShowtime on 18 November 2024.

== Accolades ==
Year	Award	Category	Nominee(s)	Result	Ref.
2025	12th Feroz Awards	Best Comedy Series		Nominated	

== See also ==
- 2024 in Spanish television
