= Pedro Casablanc =

Moroccan-Spanish actor (born 1963)

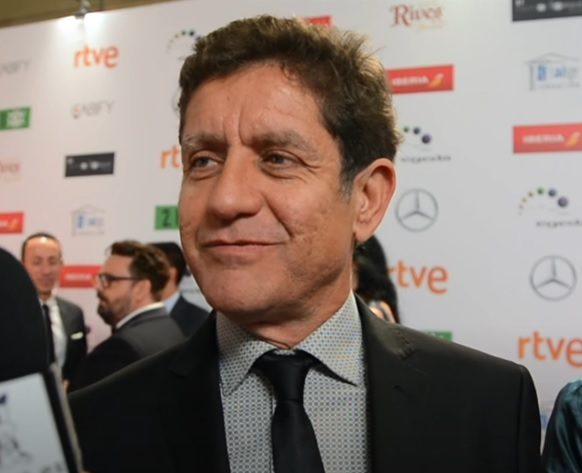
- Born: Pedro Manuel Ortiz Domínguez; 17 April 1963 (age 63); Casablanca, Morocco
- Occupation: Actor

Pedro Manuel Ortiz Domínguez (born 17 April 1963), best known by his stage name of Pedro Casablanc, is a Moroccan-born actor known for his many stage, film and television performances in Spain.

== Biography ==
Pedro Manuel Ortiz Domínguez was born in Casablanca, Morocco, on 17 April 1963. Son to Andalusian parents, he earned a licentiate degree in Fine Arts from the University of Seville. He trained his acting chops at the Centro Andaluz de Teatro (CAT), later moving to the Teatro de la Abadía in Madrid.

His screen career took off in his 30s, landing early roles in films such as My Soul Brother (1993) and Running Out of Time (1994). His first major success in television was his portrayal of El Ruso in the series Policías.

== Filmography ==
=== Film ===
Year	Title	Role	Notes	Ref.
1999	Extraños (Strangers)	Castro		
2015	B, la película	Luis Bárcenas		
2015	Sicarivs: La noche y el silencio	El hombre que fuma		
2018	Perdida	El egipcio		
2018	Viaje al cuarto de una madre (Journey to a Mother's Room)	Miguel		
2018	Superlópez	Superlópez' father on Earth		
2018	Alegría tristeza (Happy Sad)	Doctor Durán		
2019	El crack cero	Don Ricardo		
2019	Dolor y gloria (Pain and Glory)	Doctor Galindo		
2020	Explota Explota (My Heart Goes Boom!)	Celedonio		
2020	Nieva en Benidorm (It Snows in Benidorm)	Campos		
2021	La casa del caracol (The House of Snails)	Sargento Mauri		
2022	El fred que crema (The Burning Cold)	Serafí		
2022	La jefa (Under Her Control)	Julio		
2022	El universo de Óliver (Oliver's Universe)	Gabriel		
2022	Centauro	Comisario García		
2023	Strange Way of Life	Carpenter	Short film	
2023	À mon seul désir (My Sole Desire)	Pablo		
2023	La espera (The Wait)	Don Francisco		
2023	Saben aquell (Jokes & Cigarettes)	Vicente		
2024	La infiltrada (Undercover)	Jefe de brigada		
2025	El talento (The Talent)	Ignacio		
2026	La luz (The Light)	Obispo Alcalá		
2026	Gracias, equipo (Go Team!)	Domingo		
TBA	El sastre del rey	—N/a	Director	

=== Television ===
Year	Title	Role	Notes	Ref.
2000–03	Policías, en el corazón de la calle	Manuel Klimov, "Ruso"		
2002	Saint Anthony: The Miracle Worker of Padua	Francesco		
2005	Motivos personales	Pablo Acosta	Main	
2006–07	Los hombres de Paco	Torres		
2007	RIS Científica	Damián Bermejo		
2008–2011	Hospital Central	Fernando Mora		
2010	La princesa de Éboli	Mateo Vázquez	TV miniseries	
2011	El asesinato de Carrero Blanco	Comisario Sánchez	TV Miniseries	
2012–13	Isabel	Alfonso Carrillo de Acuña		
2013	Mario Conde. Los días de gloria	Mariano Rubio	TV miniseries	
2014	Amar es para siempre	Damián Blasco		
2014	Prim, el asesinato de la calle del Turco	Felipe de Solís y Campuzano	TV movie	
2015–16	Mar de plástico	Juan Rueda	Main	
2016	Cannabis	El Feo	Main	
2017	El ministerio del tiempo	Francisco de Goya	Guest role. Season 3. Episode 4.	
2017	Gunpowder	Constable of Castile	TV miniseries	
2018	Cuéntame cómo pasó	Guillermo	Introduced in Season 19	
2018	Félix		Main	
2018–19	Todo por el juego	Fernando Saldaña		
2019	Matadero		Special collaboration	
2019	Toy Boy	Inspector Zapata		
2020	White Lines	Andreu Calafat		
2021	Libertad	Don Anastasio	Special collaboration	
2021	La Fortuna	Embajador Arribas		
2022	When You Least Expect It	Pedro		
2022	Heirs to the Land	Galceran Destorrent		
2023	Los Farad	Leo Farad		
2024	Querer	Íñigo Gorosmendi		
2025	Furia (Rage)	Emilio Durán		

== Accolades ==
Year	Award	Category	Work	Result	Ref.
2001	10th Actors and Actresses Union Awards	Best Supporting Performance (TV)	Policías, en el corazón de la calle	Nominated	
2006	15th Actors and Actresses Union Awards	Best Television Actor in a Secondary Role	Motivos personales	Nominated	
2011	20th Actors and Actresses Union Awards	Best Stage Actor in a Leading Role	El arte de la comedia	Nominated	
2016	60th Sant Jordi Awards	Best Spanish Actor	B, la película	Won	
2016	30th Goya Awards	Best Actor	B, la película	Nominated	
2016	25th Actors and Actresses Union Awards	Best Film Actor in a Leading Role	B, la película	Won	
2016	66th Fotogramas de Plata	Best Stage Actor	Ruz-Bárcenas	Won	
2016	63rd Ondas Awards	Best Actor in Spanish Fiction	Mar de plástico	Won	
2017	4th Feroz Awards	Best Leading Actor (TV)	Mar de plástico	Nominated	
2017	26th Actors and Actresses Union Awards	Best Television Actor in a Leading Role	Mar de plástico	Won	
2021	76th CEC Medals	Best Supporting Actor	The Invisible	Nominated	
2023	2nd Carmen Awards	Best Supporting Actor	Oliver's Universe	Nominated	
2024	3rd Carmen Awards	Best Supporting Actor	The Wait	Nominated	
2024	16th Gaudí Awards	Best Supporting Actor	Jokes & Cigarettes	Nominated	
2024	2nd Talía Awards	Best Actor in a Leading Role in a Text Theater	Don Ramón María del Valle-Inclán	Won	
2024	27th Max Awards	Best Actor	Don Ramón María del Valle-Inclán	Nominated	
2024	30th Forqué Awards	Best Actor in a Series	Querer	Won	
2025	12th Feroz Awards	Best Main Actor in a Series	Querer	Nominated	
2025	33rd Actors and Actresses Union Awards	Best Television Actor in a Secondary Role	Querer	Won	
2026	27th Iris Awards	Best Actor	Querer	Won	
