= A House on Fire =

- Theatrical release poster
- Catalan: Casa en flames
- Directed by: Dani de la Orden
- Written by: Eduard Sola
- Starring: Emma Vilarasau; Enric Auquer; Maria Rodríguez Soto; Alberto San Juan; Clara Segura; José Pérez-Ocaña; Macarena García
- Cinematography: Pepe Gay de Liébana
- Edited by: Alberto Gutiérrez
- Music by: Maria Chiara Casà
- Production companies: Sábado Películas; Playtime Movies; 3Cat; Atresmedia Cine; ElioFilm
- Distributed by: VerCine
- Release dates: 18 April 2024 (BCN Film Fest); 28 June 2024 (Spain)
- Countries: Spain; Italy
- Languages: Catalan; Spanish
- Box office: €2.7 million

A House on Fire (Catalan: Casa en flames) is a 2024 comedy drama film directed by Dani de la Orden and written by Eduard Sola which stars Emma Vilarasau, Enric Auquer, Maria Rodríguez Soto, Alberto San Juan, Clara Segura, José Pérez-Ocaña, and Macarena García.

== Plot ==
Divorced well-off woman Montse summons her family to her Costa Brava house in Cadaqués, but despite the now limited connection to her two children, the potential sale of the building, her ex-husband's entry on the scene, and yet-to-be-settled scores, she is determined not to let anything or anybody spoil her weekend.

== Cast ==
- Emma Vilarasau as Montse
- Enric Auquer as David
- Maria Rodríguez Soto as Júlia
- Alberto San Juan as Carlos
- Clara Segura as Blanca
- José Pérez-Ocaña as Toni
- Macarena García as Marta

== Production ==
The film was produced by Sábado Películas and Playtime Movies in co-production with 3Cat, Atresmedia Cine, and ElioFilm, with the participation of Netflix and Atresmedia and backing from ICAA and ICEC. Shooting locations included a building designed by Josep Antoni Coderch in Canet de Mar. It features Catalan- and Spanish-language dialogue.

== Release ==
The film had its world premiere as the opening film of the 8th BCN Film Fest on 18 April 2024. Distributed by VerCine, it was released theatrically in Spain on 28 June 2024. It opened in 162 screens. By July 2024, it had commanded over 150,000 admissions, displaying a strong regional box-office performance in Catalonia.

== Reception ==
On the review aggregator website Rotten Tomatoes, 83% of 6 critics' reviews are positive, with an average rating of 6.5/10.

Jonathan Holland of ScreenDaily described the film as "a sugar-coated skewering of the hypocrisies of the Catalan bourgeoisie".

Beatriz Martínez of Fotogramas rated the film 4 out of 5 stars, deeming it to be Dani de la Orden's best, while highlighting "a perfectly staged cast" as the best thing about it.

Javier Ocaña of Cinemanía rated the film 3 out of 5 stars, describing it as an "elegant family shock therapy" which goes from better to worse in the verdict, otherwise comparing it unfavourably to the similar La casa.

Ekaitz Ortega of HobbyConsolas gave the film 81 points ('very good') writing that A House on Fire "is a good film with a very theatrical script, full of actors and actresses who know how to take the roles to their own territory".

Elsa Fernández-Santos of El País described the film as "a fierce parody, as dark as it is funny" about a Catalan bourgeois mother.

== Accolades ==
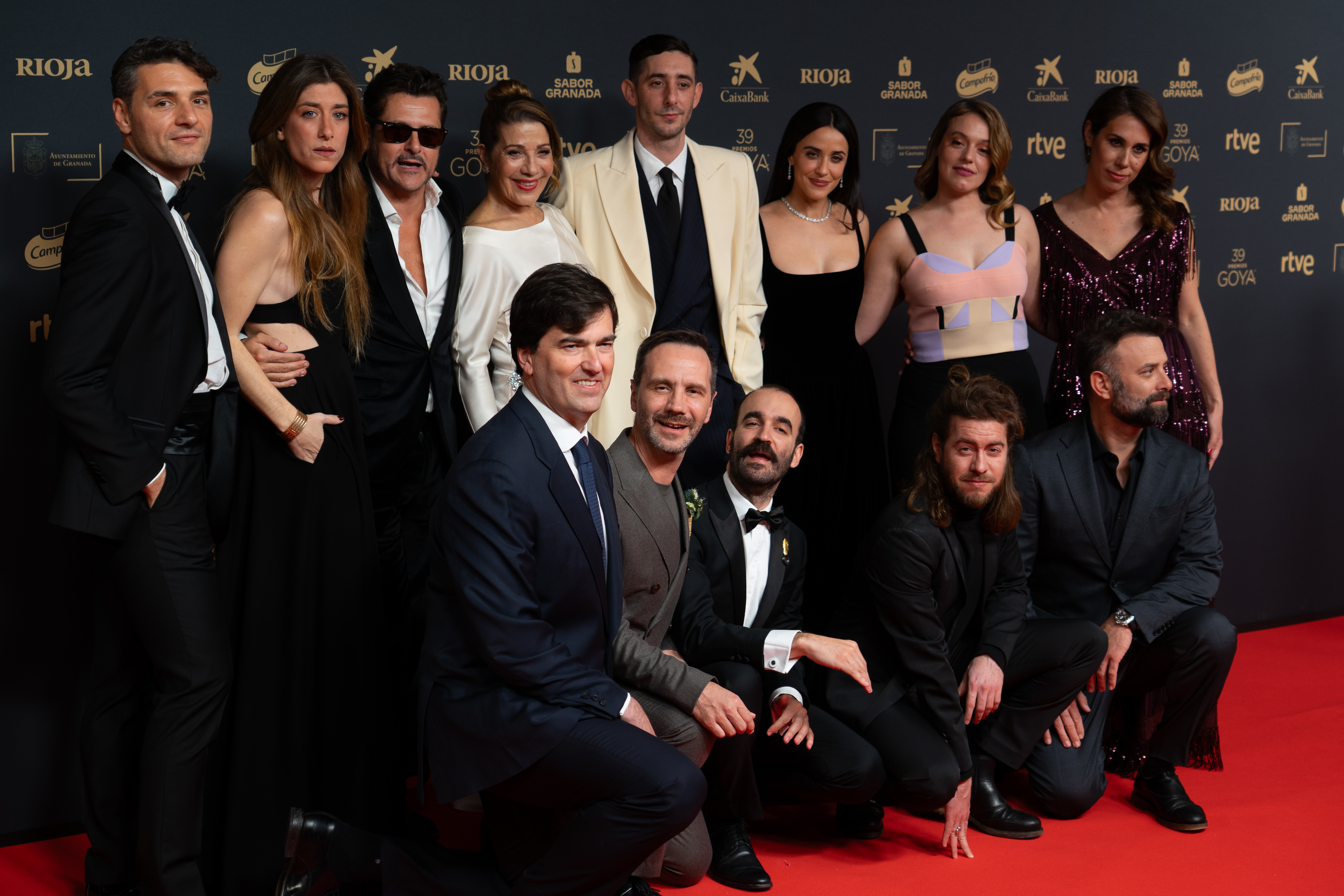
Cast and crew members attending the 39th Goya Awards in February 2025

Year	Award	Category	Nominee(s)	Result	Ref.
2024	30th Forqué Awards	Best Actress in a Film	Emma Vilarasau	Nominated	
2025	17th Gaudí Awards	Best Film		Nominated	
2025	17th Gaudí Awards	Best Director	Dani de la Orden	Nominated	
2025	17th Gaudí Awards	Best Original Screenplay	Eduard Sola	Won	
2025	17th Gaudí Awards	Best Actress	Emma Vilarasau	Won	
2025	17th Gaudí Awards	Best Actor	Alberto San Juan	Nominated	
2025	17th Gaudí Awards	Best Supporting Actress	Maria Rodríguez Soto	Nominated	
2025	17th Gaudí Awards	Best Supporting Actor	Enric Auquer	Won	
2025	17th Gaudí Awards	Best Production Supervision	Laia Gómez Roig	Nominated	
2025	17th Gaudí Awards	Best Original Score	Maria Chiara Casà	Nominated	
2025	17th Gaudí Awards	Best Editing	Alberto Gutiérrez	Nominated	
2025	17th Gaudí Awards	Best Art Direction	Núria Guàrdia Allué	Nominated	
2025	17th Gaudí Awards	Best Makeup and Hairstyles	Anna Álvarez de Sardi, Maribel Bernales	Nominated	
2025	17th Gaudí Awards	Best Sound	Elena Coderch, Sarah Romero, Oriol Tarragó, Marc Bech	Nominated	
2025	17th Gaudí Awards	Best Visual Effects	Lluís Rivera Jove, Xavi Molas, Laura Pedro	Nominated	
2025	12th Feroz Awards	Best Comedy Film		Won	
2025	12th Feroz Awards	Best Director	Dani de la Orden	Nominated	
2025	12th Feroz Awards	Best Screenplay	Eduard Sola	Won	
2025	12th Feroz Awards	Best Main Actress in a Film	Emma Vilarasau	Won	
2025	12th Feroz Awards	Best Supporting Actress in a Film	Maria Rodríguez Soto	Nominated	
2025	12th Feroz Awards	Best Supporting Actor in a Film	Enric Auquer	Nominated	
2025	12th Feroz Awards	Best Supporting Actor in a Film	Alberto San Juan	Nominated	
2025	12th Feroz Awards	Best Film Poster	Jordi Rins	Nominated	
2025	39th Goya Awards	Best Film		Nominated	
2025	39th Goya Awards	Best Original Screenplay	Eduard Sola	Won	
2025	39th Goya Awards	Best Actress	Emma Vilarasau	Nominated	
2025	39th Goya Awards	Best Actor	Alberto San Juan	Nominated	
2025	39th Goya Awards	Best Supporting Actress	Macarena García	Nominated	
2025	39th Goya Awards	Best Supporting Actress	Maria Rodríguez Soto	Nominated	
2025	39th Goya Awards	Best Supporting Actor	Enric Auquer	Nominated	
2025	39th Goya Awards	Best Production Supervision	Laia Gómez	Nominated	
2025	33rd Actors and Actresses Union Awards	Best Film Actor in a Secondary Role	Alberto San Juan	Nominated	
2025	33rd Actors and Actresses Union Awards	Best Film Actress in a Secondary Role	Macarena García	Nominated	
2025	8th ALMA Awards	Best Screenplay in a Comedy Film	Eduard Sola	Won	

== Sequel and remake ==
In October 2024, Dani de la Orden announced the intended development of a sequel entitled Casa en cendres.

In December 2025, media reported the development of an Italian remake produced by Wildside, Eliofilm and PiperFilm, starring Margherita Buy in the leading role.

== See also ==
- List of Spanish films of 2024
