= It Snows in Benidorm =

- Theatrical release poster
- Spanish: Nieva en Benidorm
- Directed by: Isabel Coixet
- Written by: Isabel Coixet
- Produced by: Pedro Almodóvar; Agustín Almodóvar; Esther García
- Starring: Timothy Spall; Sarita Choudhury; Carmen Machi; Pedro Casablanc; Ana Torrent
- Cinematography: Jean-Claude Larrieu
- Edited by: Jordi Azategui
- Music by: Alfonso de Vilallonga
- Production companies: El Deseo; RTVE; Movistar; ViacomCBS International Studios
- Distributed by: BTeam Pictures
- Release dates: 24 October 2020 (Seminci); 11 December 2020 (Spain)
- Country: Spain
- Languages: English; Spanish
- Budget: 4.2€ million
- Box office: 326,609€

It Snows in Benidorm (Spanish: Nieva en Benidorm) is a 2020 Spanish drama film written and directed by Isabel Coixet. It stars Timothy Spall and Sarita Choudhury alongside Pedro Casablanc, Carmen Machi and Ana Torrent.

The film had its world premiere at the Valladolid International Film Festival on 24 October 2020. It was released in Spain on 13 November 2020 by BTeam Pictures.

== Plot ==
Retired Mancunian Peter Riordan travels to Benidorm to acquaint with his brother Daniel, who lives there, only to discover that he is missing. He tries find out about Daniel's whereabouts with help from Alex, a mysterious woman and worker in the burlesque club operated by Daniel.

== Cast ==
- Timothy Spall as Peter Riordan
- Sarita Choudhury as Alex
- Pedro Casablanc as Esteban Campos
- Carmen Machi as Marta
- Ana Torrent as Lucía

== Production ==
In February 2019, it was announced Isabel Coixet would write and direct the film, with Pedro Almodóvar and Agustín Almodóvar serving as producers via their El Deseo banner. In January 2020, Timothy Spall, Sarita Choudhury, Pedro Casablanc, Carmen Machi and Ana Torrent joined the cast of the film.

Principal photography began in January 2020.

== Release ==
The film had its world premiere at the Valladolid International Film Festival (Seminci) on 24 October 2020. It was scheduled to be released theatrically in Spain on 13 November 2020 by BTeam Pictures, but the release was postponed to 11 December 2020 due to the second COVID-19 wave in the country.
