= Platino Award for Best Ibero-American Comedy Film =

- Awarded for: Best Ibero-American Comedy Film
- Country: Ibero-America
- Presented by: Entidad de Gestión de Derechos de los Productores Audiovisuales (EGEDA), Federación Iberoamericana de Productores Cinematográficos y Audiovisuales (FIPCA)
- Currently held by: The Dinner (2026)
- Website: premiosplatino.com

The Platino Award for Best Ibero-American Comedy Film (Spanish: Premio Platino a la mejor película en el género de comedia iberoamericana de ficción) is one of the Platino Awards, Ibero-America's film awards, presented by the Entidad de Gestión de Derechos de los Productores Audiovisuales (EGEDA) and the Federación Iberoamericana de Productores Cinematográficos y Audiovisuales (FIPCA).

== History ==
The category was introduced at the tenth edition in 2023, being the latest addition to the awards. The first recipient of the award was the Spanish-Argentine co-production Official Competition, directed by Gastón Duprat and Mariano Cohn. 2023 nominee Bardo, False Chronicle of a Handful of Truths is the only film to be nominated for both this award and for Best Ibero-American Film. As of 2025, all winners have been Spanish productions or co-productions.

In the list below. the winner of the award for each year is shown first, followed by the other nominees.

== Awards and nominations ==
=== 2020s ===
Year	English title	Original title	Director	Country
2023 (10th)	Official Competition	Competencia oficial	Gastón Duprat, Mariano Cohn	Spain; Argentina
2023 (10th)	Bardo, False Chronicle of a Handful of Truths	Bardo, falsa crónica de unas cuantas verdades	Alejandro G. Iñárritu	Mexico
2023 (10th)	All Hail	Granizo	Marcos Carnevale	Argentina
2023 (10th)	Off-Lined	Desconectados	Diego Rougier	Chile
2024 (11th)	Under Therapy	Bajo terapia	Gerardo Herrero	Spain
2024 (11th)	Los Wanabis		Santiago Paladines	Ecuador
2024 (11th)	Norma		Santiago Giralt	Argentina; Uruguay
2024 (11th)	Love & Revolution	Te estoy amando locamente	Alejandro Marín	Spain
2025 (12th)	Idol Affair	Buscando a Coque	Teresa Bellón, César F. Calvillo	Spain
2025 (12th)	Campamento con Mamá		Martino Zaidelis	Argentina
2025 (12th)	El Candidato Honesto		Luis Felipe Ybarra	Mexico
2025 (12th)	Father There Is Only One 4	Padre no hay más que uno 4	Santiago Segura	Spain
2026 (13th)	The Dinner	La cena	Manuel Gómez Pereira	Spain
2026 (13th)	Homo Argentum		Gastón Duprat, Mariano Cohn	Argentina; Spain
2026 (13th)	A Loose End	Un cabo suelto	Daniel Hendler	Uruguay; Argentina; Spain
2026 (13th)	A Poet	Un poeta	Simón Mesa Soto	Colombia

== See also ==
- Feroz Award for Best Comedy Film
