= I, Addict =

- Created by: Javier Giner; Aitor Gabilondo
- Based on: Yo, adicto by Javier Giner
- Written by: Javier Giner; Aitor Gabilondo; Jorge Gil; Alba Carballal
- Directed by: Javier Giner; Elena Trapé
- Starring: Oriol Pla; Nora Navas; Ramón Barea; Marina Salas; Itziar Lazkano; Bernabé Fernández; Catalina Sopelana; Victoria Luengo; Omar Ayuso
- Country of origin: Spain
- Original language: Spanish
- No. of seasons: 1
- No. of episodes: 6

Production
- Cinematography: Diego Dussuel
- Running time: 28-46 min
- Production companies: Disney+; Alea Media

Original release
- Network: Disney+
- Release: 30 October 2024

I, Addict (Spanish: Yo, adicto) is a 2024 Spanish drama television miniseries created by Javier Giner and Aitor Gabilondo based on Giner's same-titled autobiographical novel. It premiered on Disney+ on 30 October 2024.

== Premise ==
Javier Giner is a professional in the audiovisual industry who decides to voluntarily enter a detoxification centre in search of professional help.

== Cast ==
- Oriol Pla as Javier Giner
- Nora Navas as Anais López
- Ramón Barea
- Marina Salas as Lola
- Itziar Lazkano
- Bernabé Fernández
- Catalina Sopelana
- Victoria Luengo as Rui
- Omar Ayuso as Iker

== Production ==
I, Addict was produced by Disney+ alongside Alea Media.

== Release ==
I, Addict made it to a special screening slot of the 72nd San Sebastián International Film Festival for a pre-screening. The series was released on Disney+ on 30 October 2024.

== Accolades ==
Year	Award	Category	Nominee(s)	Result	Ref.
2024	30th Forqué Awards	Best Actor in a Series	Oriol Pla	Nominated	
2025	12th Feroz Awards	Best Drama Series		Nominated	
2025	12th Feroz Awards	Best Main Actor in a Series	Oriol Pla	Won	
2025	12th Feroz Awards	Best Supporting Actress in a Series	Nora Navas	Won	
2025	12th Feroz Awards	Best Screenplay in a Series	Javier Giner, Aitor Gabilondo, Jorge Gil, Alba Carballal	Nominated	
2025	33rd Actors and Actresses Union Awards	Best Television Actor in a Leading Role	Oriol Pla	Won	
2025	33rd Actors and Actresses Union Awards	Best Television Actress in a Secondary Role	Marina Salas	Won	
2025	33rd Actors and Actresses Union Awards	Best Television Actor in a Minor Role	Omar Ayuso	Nominated	
2025	53rd International Emmy Awards	Best Actor	Oriol Pla	Won	
2026	27th Iris Awards	Best Fiction		Pending	
2026	27th Iris Awards	Best Actor	Oriol Pla	Pending	
2026	27th Iris Awards	Best Fiction Production	Sofía Fábregas, Aitor Gabilondo, Laura Rubirola Sala, Javier Giner, Javier Pascual	Pending	
2026	27th Iris Awards	Best Fiction Screenplay	Javier Giner, Jorge Gil, Alba Carballal, Aitor Gabilondo	Pending	
