= The Delights of the Garden =

- Spanish: Las delicias del jardín
- Directed by: Fernando Colomo
- Screenplay by: Fernando Colomo; Pablo Colomo
- Produced by: Fernando Colomo; José Luis Povedano
- Starring: Fernando Colomo; Pablo Colomo; Carmen Machi; Antonio Resines
- Cinematography: José Luis Alcaine
- Music by: Fernando Furones
- Production companies: Comba Films; Telespan 2000
- Distributed by: Vértice 360
- Release date: 19 September 2025
- Country: Spain
- Language: Spanish

The Delights of the Garden (Spanish: Las delicias del jardín) is a 2025 Spanish comedy film directed by Fernando Colomo, who also stars along with Pablo Colomo.

== Plot ==
The plot follows the mishaps of Fermín a painter who joins a competition to create a reinterpretation of The Garden of Earthly Delights, and the relationship with his son Pablo, another painter.

== Cast ==
- Fernando Colomo as Fermín
- Pablo Colomo as Pablo
- Carmen Machi as Pepa
- Antonio Resines as Antonio
- Brays Efe
- María Hervás
- Luis Bermejo
- Javier de Juan as himself
- Cumelén Sanz

== Production ==
The film was produced by Comba Films and Telespan 2000 (Squirrel Media), with the participation of Prime Video and the backing from the Madrid regional administration. Filming began on 23 September 2025 in Madrid.

== Release ==
The film was released theatrically in Spain on 19 September 2025 by Vértice 360, the same date it was screened in the 'Made in Spain' section of the 73rd San Sebastián International Film Festival. Latido Films acquired worldsales rights.

== See also ==
- List of Spanish films of 2025
