= See You in Another Life =

Spanish television series

- Spanish: Nos vemos en otra vida
- Created by: Jorge Sánchez-Cabezudo; Alberto Sánchez-Cabezudo
- Based on: Nos vemos en esta vida o en la otra by Manuel Jabois
- Directed by: Jorge Sánchez-Cabezudo; Borja Soler
- Starring: Roberto Gutiérrez; Pol López
- Music by: Olivier Arson; Abel Fernández
- Country of origin: Spain
- Original language: Spanish
- No. of episodes: 6

Production
- Production company: Kubik Films

Original release
- Network: Disney+
- Release: 6 March 2024

See You in Another Life (Spanish: Nos vemos en otra vida) is a 2024 Spanish crime drama miniseries created by Jorge Sánchez-Cabezudo and Alberto Sánchez-Cabezudo based on the interview book by Manuel Jabois and set against the backdrop of the procurement of explosives for the 11M train bombings.

== Plot ==
The plot focuses on the plight of Gabriel Montoya Vidal "Baby", a 16-year-old petty criminal who associated in 2004 with schizophrenic retired miner Emilio Trashorras for the transfer of explosives used in the 11M train bombings from Asturias to Madrid and who became the first person convicted for the attacks.

== Cast ==
- Roberto Gutiérrez as Baby (teen)
- Pol López as Emilio Trashorras
- Tamara Casellas as Baby's mother
- Quim Ávila as Baby (grown up)
- Mourad Ouani as El Chino
- Jaime Zataraín as Manuel Jabois

== Production ==
A Kubik Films production, the series is based on the book Nos vemos en esta vida o en la otra by Manuel Jabois. It was created by Jorge Sánchez-Cabezudo and Alberto Sánchez-Cabezudo, while the former teamed up with Borja Soler for direction duties. The writing team also included Pablo Remón, Roberto Martín Maiztegui, Daniel Remón, and Guillermo Chapa.

== Release ==
The series was presented at the 27th Málaga Film Festival on 4 March 2024. It was released on Disney+ on 6 March 2024.

== Reception ==
Marta Medina of El Confidencial rated the series—"an impressive Fincherian drama"—5 out of 5 stars.

== Accolades ==
Year	Award	Category	Nominee(s)	Result	Ref.
2025	12th Feroz Awards	Best Drama Series		Nominated	
2025	12th Feroz Awards	Best Screenplay in a Series	Jorge Sánchez-Cabezudo, Alberto Sánchez-Cabezudo, Pablo Remón, Daniel Remón, Roberto Martín Maiztegui, Guillermo Chapa	Nominated	
2025	12th Feroz Awards	Best Supporting Actor in a Series	Pol López	Won	
2025	12th Feroz Awards	Best Supporting Actress in a Series	Tamara Casellas	Nominated	
2025	8th ALMA Awards	Best Screenplay in a Drama Series	Alberto Sánchez-Cabezudo, Jorge Sánchez-Cabezudo, Guillermo Chapa, Roberto Martín Maiztegui, Daniel Remón, Pablo Remón	Nominated	

== See also ==
- 2024 in Spanish television
