= Undercover (2024 film) =

- Theatrical release poster
- Spanish: La infiltrada
- Directed by: Arantxa Echevarría
- Written by: Amèlia Mora; Arantxa Echevarría
- Produced by: María Luisa Gutiérrez; Mercedes Gamero; Pablo Nogueroles; Álvaro Ariza
- Starring: Carolina Yuste; Luis Tosar
- Cinematography: Daniel Salmones
- Edited by: Victoria Lammers
- Production companies: Bowfinger International Pictures; Beta Fiction Spain; Esto también pasará; Infiltrada LP AIE
- Distributed by: Beta Fiction Spain
- Release date: 11 October 2024
- Running time: 118 min
- Country: Spain
- Language: Spanish
- Box office: €9.7 million

Undercover (Spanish: La infiltrada) is a 2024 Spanish thriller film directed by Arantxa Echevarría starring Carolina Yuste and Luis Tosar.

== Plot ==
The plot is based on true story of an undercover agent who infiltrated ETA under the name 'Aranzazu Berradre Marín' and managed to dismantle the 'Donosti' cell.

== Cast ==
- Carolina Yuste as Mónica / Arantxa
- Luis Tosar as Ángel Salcedo, "El Inhumano" ('The Inhuman')
- Víctor Clavijo as Teruel
- Nausicaa Bonnín as Andrea
- Iñigo Gastesi as Kepa Etxebarría
- Diego Anido as Sergio Polo
- Pepe Ocio
- Jorge Rueda
- Carlos Troya
- Pedro Casablanc

== Production ==
Undercover is a Bowfinger International Pictures, Beta Fiction Spain, Esto también pasará, and Infiltrada LP AIE production, with the association of Filmfactory Entertainment, the participation of Movistar Plus+, Atresmedia, EiTB, and Crea SGR and backing from ICAA. Principal photography began on 5 February 2024. Shooting locations included San Sebastián.

== Release ==
Distributed by Beta Fiction Spain, the film was released theatrically in Spain on 11 October 2024. It opened to over €1.1 million, thus becoming the 2nd largest opening for a Spanish film in 2024 up to that date.

By February 2025, the film had grossed around €8.5 million at the Spanish box office. By that time it had already become the highest-grossing Spanish film directed by a woman. CDI Films took over distribution in Argentina, setting a 15 May 2025 theatrical release date.

== Reception ==
María Bescós of HobbyConsolas gave the film 80 points ('very good') praising how "the rhythm and tension are constant" and Yuste's work as the film's best.

Rubén Romero Santos of Cinemanía rated the film 4 out of 5 stars, writing that it "takes off and excels when political terrorism is mixed and confused with gender terrorism".

Juan Sardá of El Cultural rated the film 4 out of 5 stars, writing that it "hooks like the best thrillers and boldly and knowledgeably portrays a recent historical era that today seems hard to believe".

== Accolades ==
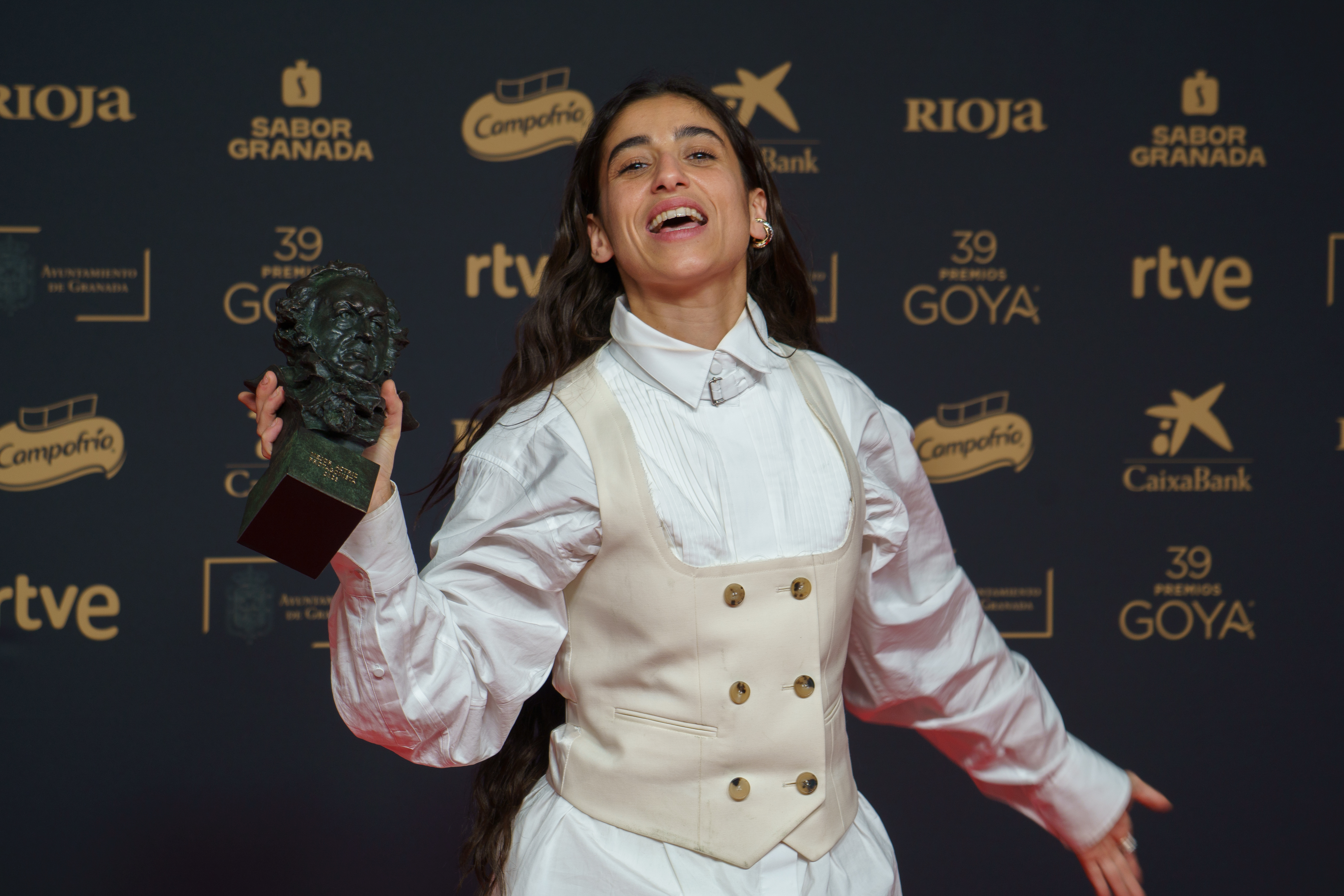
Yuste won the Goya Award for Best Actress for her performance in the film

Year	Award	Category	Nominee(s)	Result	Ref.
2024	30th Forqué Awards	Best Film		Nominated	
2024	30th Forqué Awards	Best Actress in a Film	Carolina Yuste	Won	
2024	30th Forqué Awards	Cinema and Education in Values		Nominated	
2025	12th Feroz Awards	Best Director	Arantxa Echevarría	Nominated	
2025	12th Feroz Awards	Best Main Actress in a Film	Carolina Yuste	Nominated	
2025	12th Feroz Awards	Best Trailer	Javier Morales	Nominated	
2025	80th CEC Medals	Best Film		Won	
2025	80th CEC Medals	Best Director	Arantxa Echevarría	Won	
2025	80th CEC Medals	Best Original Screenplay	Amèlia Mora, Arantxa Echevarría	Won	
2025	80th CEC Medals	Best Actress	Carolina Yuste	Won	
2025	80th CEC Medals	Best Supporting Actor	Luis Tosar	Won	
2025	80th CEC Medals	Best Supporting Actress	Nausicaa Bonnín	Nominated	
2025	80th CEC Medals	Best Cinematography	Javier Salmones	Nominated	
2025	80th CEC Medals	Best Editing	Victoria Lammers	Won	
2025	80th CEC Medals	Best Music	Fernando Velázquez	Nominated	
2025	39th Goya Awards	Best Film		Won	
2025	39th Goya Awards	Best Director	Arantxa Echevarría	Nominated	
2025	39th Goya Awards	Best Actress	Carolina Yuste	Won	
2025	39th Goya Awards	Best Supporting Actress	Nausicaa Bonnín	Nominated	
2025	39th Goya Awards	Best Supporting Actor	Luis Tosar	Nominated	
2025	39th Goya Awards	Best Cinematography	Javier Salmones	Nominated	
2025	39th Goya Awards	Best Editing	Victoria Lammers	Nominated	
2025	39th Goya Awards	Best Original Screenplay	Amèlia Mora, Arantxa Echevarría	Nominated	
2025	39th Goya Awards	Best Original Score	Fernando Velázquez	Nominated	
2025	39th Goya Awards	Best Makeup and Hairstyles	Patricia Rodríguez, Tono Garzón	Nominated	
2025	39th Goya Awards	Best Sound	Fabio Huete, Jorge Castillo Ballesteros, Miriam Lisón, Mayte Cabrera	Nominated	
2025	39th Goya Awards	Best Special Effects	Mariano García Marty, Jon Serrano, Juliana Lasunción	Nominated	
2025	39th Goya Awards	Best Production Supervision	Axier Pérez Serrano	Nominated	
2025	33rd Actors and Actresses Union Awards	Best Film Actress in a Leading Role	Carolina Yuste	Won	
2025	33rd Actors and Actresses Union Awards	Best Film Actor in a Minor Role	Carlos Troya	Nominated	
2025	8th ALMA Awards	Best Screenplay in a Drama Film	Arantxa Echevarría, Amèlia Mora	Nominated	
2025	12th Platino Awards	Best Ibero-American Film		Nominated	
2025	12th Platino Awards	Best Director	Arantxa Echevarría	Nominated	
2025	12th Platino Awards	Best Screenplay	Arantxa Echevarría, Amèlia Mora	Won	
2025	12th Platino Awards	Best Original Score	Fernando Velázquez	Nominated	
2025	12th Platino Awards	Best Actor	Luis Tosar	Nominated	
2025	12th Platino Awards	Best Actress	Carolina Yuste	Nominated	
2025	12th Platino Awards	Best Supporting Actor	Diego Anido	Nominated	
2025	12th Platino Awards	Best Film Editing	Victoria Lammers	Won	
2025	12th Platino Awards	Best Art Direction	Eduardo Hidalgo	Nominated	
2025	12th Platino Awards	Best Cinematography	Javier Salmones	Nominated	
2025	12th Platino Awards	Best Sound	Jorge Castillo, Fabio Huete, Mayte Cabrera, Miriam Lisón	Nominated	
2025	19th Sur Awards	Best Ibero-American Film		Nominated	

== See also ==
- List of Spanish films of 2024
