= 33rd Actors and Actresses Union Awards =

Spanish awards ceremony in 2025

- Date: 10 March 2025
- Site: Circo Price, Madrid, Spain
- Hosted by: Eduardo Tovar; Silvana Navas
- Organized by: Actors and Actresses Union

Highlights
- Honorary career award: Ana Belén

The 33rd Actors and Actresses Union Awards ceremony took place on 10 March 2025 at the Circo Price in Madrid. It was hosted by Eduardo Tovar and Silvana Navas.

In addition to the competitive awards, the team of professionals of the 016 phone line service were recognised with the 'Mujeres en Unión' award, whilst Ana Belén was bestowed the 'Toda una vida' life achievement career award and Gloria de la Fuente received the special award.

== Winners and nominees ==
The winners and nominees are listed as follows:

=== Film ===
Best Male Performance in a Leading Role: Eduard Fernández — Marco, the Invented Truth; Daniel Ibáñez — Saturn Return; Urko Olazabal — I'm Nevenka	Best Female Performance in a Leading Role: Carolina Yuste — Undercover; Najwa Nimri — The Red Virgin; Patricia López Arnaiz — Glimmers
Best Male Performance in a Secondary Role: Patrick Criado — The Red Virgin; Alberto San Juan — A House on Fire; Antonio de la Torre — Glimmers	Best Female Performance in a Secondary Role: Clara Segura — The 47; Aixa Villagrán — The Red Virgin; Macarena García — A House on Fire
Best Male Performance in a Minor Role: Carlos Cuevas — The 47; Juan Diego Botto — The Room Next Door; Carlos Troya — Undercover	Best Female Performance in a Minor Role: Esther Isla — I'm Nevenka; Catalina Sopelana — The Blue Star; Victoria Luengo — The Room Next Door

=== Television ===
Best Male Performance in a Leading Role: Oriol Pla — I, Addict; Alberto San Juan — Cristóbal Balenciaga; Tristán Ulloa — The Asunta Case	Best Female Performance in a Leading Role: Candela Peña — The Asunta Case; Iria del Río — The New Years; Victoria Luengo — Red Queen
Best Male Performance in a Secondary Role: Pedro Casablanc — Querer; Javier Gutiérrez — The Asunta Case; Miguel Bernardeau — Querer	Best Female Performance in a Secondary Role: Marina Salas — I, Addict; Clara Sans — Celeste; Loreto Mauleón — Querer
Best Male Performance in a Minor Role: Jorge Usón — Las abogadas; Aitor Merino — Ángela; Omar Ayuso — I, Addict	Best Female Performance in a Minor Role: Elisabet Gelabert — Querer; Alicia Borrachero — The Asunta Case; Belén Cuesta — Cristóbal Balenciaga

=== Theatre ===
Best Male Performance in a Leading Role: Jan Buxaderas — The Book of Mormon; Ginés García Millán — Bohemian Lights; Guillermo Toledo — 1936	Best Female Performance in a Leading Role: Aitana Sánchez-Gijón — La madre; Blanca Portillo — 1936; María Garralón — Ifigenia
Best Male Performance in a Secondary Role: Alberto Amarilla — Lorca por Saura; Álex Villazán — La madre; Rubén de Eguía — El fin	Best Female Performance in a Secondary Role: Eva Isanta — Las que gritan; Belén Landaluce — La casa de Bernarda Alba; Chus Herranz — Los chicos del coro
Best Male Performance in a Minor Role: Fran Cantos — The Mayor of Zalamea; César Sánchez — Los lunes al sol; Miguel Angel Amor — El castillo de Lindabridis	Best Female Performance in a Minor Role: Júlia Roch — La madre; Elisa Forcano — Caminando; Nieves Soria — El teatro de las locas

=== Newcomers ===
Best New Actor: Pepe Lorente — The Blue Star; Cristalino — Saturn Return; Óscar Lasarte — May I Speak with the Enemy?	Best New Actress: Zoe Bonafonte — The 47; Alba Planas — The Red Virgin; Laura Weissmahr — Salve Maria

=== International productions ===
Best Male Performance in an International Production: Javier Bardem — Monsters: The Lyle and Erik Menendez Story; Álvaro Morte — Immaculate; Tomás Pozzi — Kill Me	Best Female Performance in an International Production: Karla Sofía Gascón — Emilia Pérez; Maria Caballero — The First Omen; Susi Sánchez — Reinas
