= Carmen Machi =

Spanish actress (born 1963)

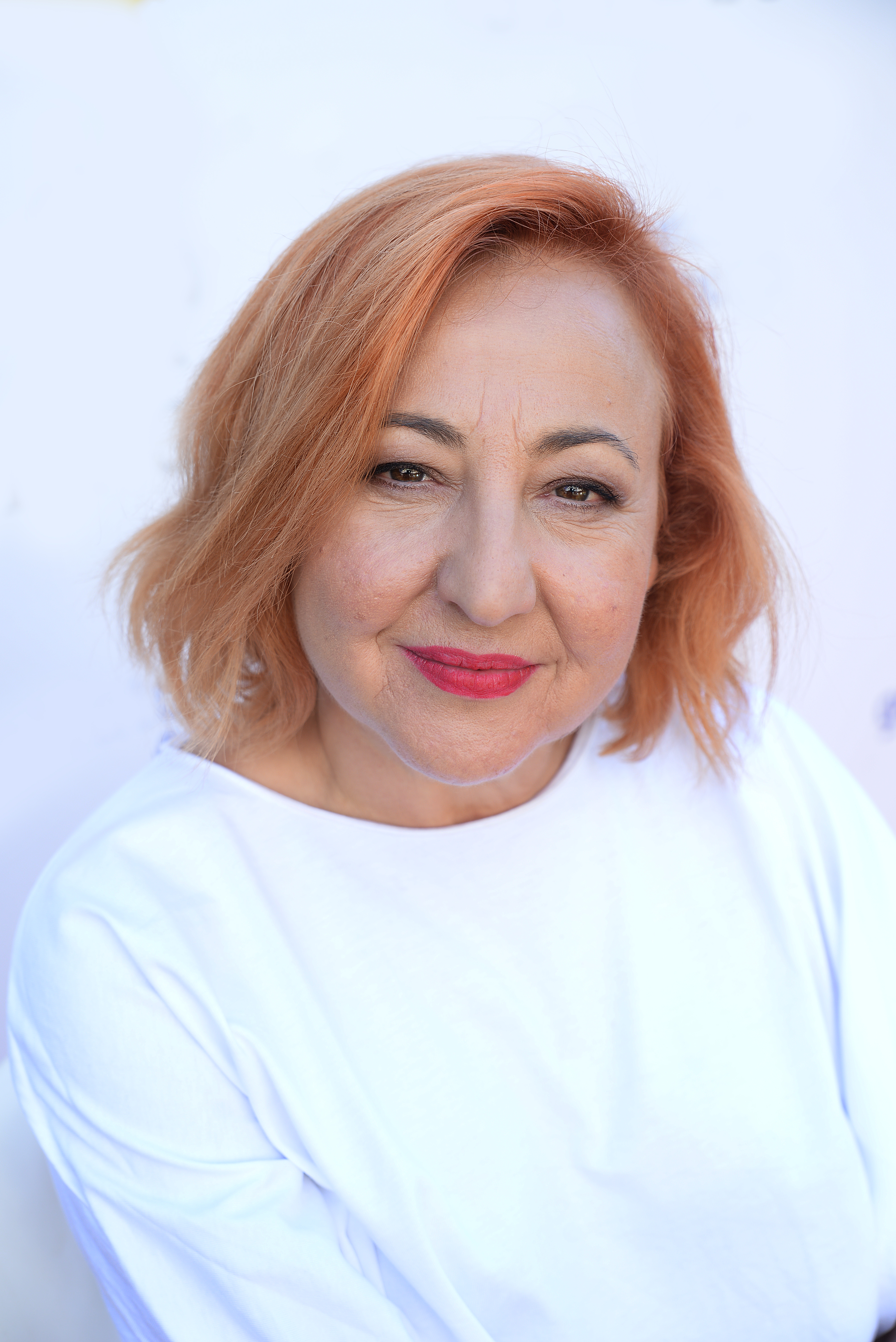
- Machi in 2017
- Born: María del Carmen Machi Arroyo; 7 January 1963 (age 63); Madrid, Spain
- Occupation: Actress
- Years active: 1994-present

María del Carmen Machi Arroyo (born 7 January 1963) is a Spanish actress. She became popular for her role as Aída in the sitcom 7 vidas and its spin-off Aída. She has since garnered industry recognition for films such as Spanish Affair and The Open Door and television series such as La mesías and Celeste.

== Biography ==
María del Carmen Machi Arroyo was born on 7 January 1963 in Madrid and raised in neighbouring Getafe. Her father's family comes from Genoa, Italy.

After several years as a theatre actress, she became popular thanks to her character Aída. She first played this role in the TV series 7 Vidas, and later in a spinoff series featuring that character, Aída.

She made her feature film debut in Shacky Carmine (1999). She has also worked in movies like Talk to Her (2002), Chill Out! (2003), I'm So Excited (2013), Spanish Affair (2014) and Spanish Affair 2 (2015).

In 2024, she was awarded the Gold Medal of Merit in the Fine Arts. In 2026, she was awarded the National Film Prize.

== Filmography ==
=== Film ===
Key
†	Denotes films that have not yet been released

Year	Title	Role	Notes	Ref.
1999	Shacky Carmine	Periodista Telek	Feature film debut	
2000	Para pegarse un tiro	Vania		
2001	Sin vergüenza (No Shame)	Cecilia		
2002	Hable con ella (Talk to Her)	Enfermera Jefe		
2002	El caballero Don Quijote (Don Quixote, Knight Errant)	Teresa		
2003	Torremolinos 73	Clienta Peluquería		
2003	Descongélate! (Chill Out!)	Carmela		
2004	Escuela de seducción	Camarera rombo		
2005	Vida y color (Life and Color)	Leo		
2005	El sueño de una noche de San Juan	Mostaza	Voice	
2005	Un rey en la Habana	Estrella		
2006	Lo que sé de Lola (Lola)	Carmen		
2007	Surf's Up		Spanish dub	
2007	Lo mejor de mí (The Best of Me)	Carmen		
2009	Los abrazos rotos (Broken Embraces)	Chon		
2009	La mujer sin piano	Rosa		
2010	Pájaros de papel (Paper Birds)	Rocío Moliner		
2010	Que se mueran los feos (To Hell with the Ugly)	Nati		
2013	Los amantes pasajeros (I'm So Excited!)	Portera		
2013	La Estrella	Trini		
2014	Murieron por encima de sus posibilidades	Susana		
2014	Ocho apellidos vascos (Spanish Affair)	Merche / Anne		
2014	Kamikaze	Lola		
2015	Ocho apellidos catalanes (Spanish Affair 2)	Merche / Carme		
2015	Mi gran noche (My Big Night)	Rosa		
2016	La puerta abierta (The Open Door)	Rosa		
2016	Villaviciosa de al lado (A Stroke of Luck)	Mari		
2016	Las furias (The Furies)	Casandra		
2017	El bar (The Bar)	Trini		
2017	Pieles (Skins)	Claudia		
2018	Thi Mai, rumbo a Vietnam	Carmen		
2018	La tribu (The Tribe)	Virginia		
2019	Lo nunca visto	Teresa		
2020	Nieva en Benidorm (It Snows in Benidorm)	Marta		
2022	Cerdita (Piggy)	Asun		
2022	Amor de madre (Honeymoon with My Mother)	Mari Carmen		
2022	Llenos de gracia (Full of Grace)	Marina		
2022	La voluntaria (The Volunteer)	Marisa		
2022	Rainbow	Maribel		
2022	Mañana es hoy (Tomorrow Is Today)	Pilar		
2023	La voz del sol (Speak Sunlight)	Maruja		
2024	Tratamos demasiado bien a las mujeres (We Treat Women Too Well)	Remedios Buendía		
2024	Verano en diciembre (Family Affairs)	Teresa		
2025	Las delicias del jardín (The Delights of the Garden)	Pepa		
2025	Día de caza (Ladies' Hunting Party)	Carmen		
2026	Aída y vuelta (Aida, the Movie)	Herself / Aída García García		
2026	Los justos (The Righteous)	Remedios		
2026	53 domingos (53 Sundays)	Natalia		
2026	Amarga Navidad (Bitter Christmas)			
2026	El director (The Editor)			
2027	Si los muertos hablaran †	Mar Ventura		
TBA	Porto Rico †			
TBA	Brutal †	Ágata		

=== Television ===
Year	Title	Role	Notes	Ref.
1999–2006	7 vidas	Aída García García	101 Episodes	
2000–2001	Policías, en el corazón de la calle	Mónica	4 Episodes	
2005–2014	Aída	Aída García García	Main Role	
2007	Lo que surja	Madre de Alex	Episode: Voy a contarlo	
2012	Rescatando a Sara	Leticia Carancho	2 Episodes	
2012	Fenómenos	Dulce	1 Episode	
2018	Arde Madrid	Clara Pérez	4 Episodes	
2019	Criminal: Spain	Isabel Ferradas Pérez	Episode: Isabel	
2019	Vida Perfecta	María del Pilar	3 Episodes	
2020	30 Coins	Carmen	Episode: Telarañas	
2023	La Mesías	Montserrat	Character is also portrayed by Ana Rujas and Lola Dueñas	
2024	Celeste	Sara Santano		
2025	Furia (Rage)	Marga		

== Accolades ==
Year	Award	Category	Work	Result	Ref.
2005	14th Actors and Actresses Union Awards	Best Television Actress in a Secondary Role	7 vidas	Won	
2006	15th Actors and Actresses Union Awards	Best Television Actress in a Leading Role	Aída	Won	
2009	18th Actors and Actresses Union Awards	Best Stage Actress in a Leading Role	La tortuga de Darwin	Won	
2011	66th CEC Medals	Best Actress	Paper Birds	Nominated	
2014	6th Gaudí Awards	Best Supporting Actress	La Estrella	Nominated	
2015	2nd Feroz Awards	Best Supporting Actress in a Film	Spanish Affair	Nominated	
2015	70th CEC Medals	Best Supporting Actress	Spanish Affair	Nominated	
2015	29th Goya Awards	Best Supporting Actress	Spanish Affair	Won	
2015	24th Actors and Actresses Union Awards	Best Film Actress in a Secondary Role	Spanish Affair	Won	
2017	4th Feroz Awards	Best Main Actress in a Film	The Open Door	Nominated	
2017	72nd CEC Medals	Best Actress	The Open Door	Nominated	
2017	31st Goya Awards	Best Actress	The Open Door	Nominated	
2017	26th Actors and Actresses Union Awards	Best Film Actress in a Leading Role	The Open Door	Won	
2021	8th Feroz Awards	Best Supporting Actress in a Series	30 Coins	Nominated	
2023	10th Feroz Awards	Best Supporting Actress in a Film	Piggy	Nominated	
2023	37th Goya Awards	Best Supporting Actress	Piggy	Nominated	
2023	10th Platino Awards	Best Supporting Actress	Piggy	Nominated	
2024	11th Feroz Awards	Best Supporting Actress in a Series	La mesías	Nominated	
2024	11th Platino Awards	Best Supporting Actress in a Miniseries or TV Series	La mesías	Won	
2024	30th Forqué Awards	Best Actress in a Series	Celeste	Nominated	
2025	26th Iris Awards	Best Actress	La mesías	Pending	
2025	12th Feroz Awards	Best Main Actress in a Series	Celeste	Pending	
2026	27th Iris Awards	Best Actress	Celeste	Won	
2026	32nd Forqué Awards	Best Actress in a Series	Celeste	Pending	
