= The Flamenco Guitar of Yerai Cortés =

- Theatrical release poster
- Spanish: La guitarra flamenca de Yerai Cortés
- Directed by: Antón Álvarez
- Produced by: Cris Trenas; Antón Álvarez; Santos Bacana
- Cinematography: Uri Barcelona; Diego Trenas; Arnau Valls; Alvar Riu; Nauzet Gaspar
- Edited by: Marcos Flórez (Numax); Cristóbal Fernández
- Production company: Little Spain
- Distributed by: A Contracorriente Films
- Release dates: 20 September 2024 (Zinemaldia); 20 December 2024 (Spain)
- Running time: 95 min
- Country: Spain
- Language: Spanish

The Flamenco Guitar of Yerai Cortés (Spanish: La guitarra flamenca de Yerai Cortés) is a 2024 Spanish documentary film directed by Antón Álvarez (in his directorial debut) about the family of flamenco guitarist Yerai Cortés.

== Plot ==
The documentary explores the recording of an album by Yerai Cortés as well as a secret involving Cortés' family.

== Release ==
The film worldpremiered as the opening film of the 'New Directors' strand of the 72nd San Sebastián International Film Festival in September 2024. It was also selected for a special screening at the 69th Valladolid International Film Festival. Distributed by A Contracorriente Films, it was released theatrically in Spain on 20 December 2024. It also made it to the 'Bright Future' strand of the 54th International Film Festival Rotterdam (IFFR) for its international premiere on 2 February 2025.

== Reception ==
Júlia Olmo of Cineuropa declared the film a "dazzling and powerful directorial debut", that "manages to go beyond the usual documentary to reflect the beauty and pain that often exist in human relationships".

Ricardo Rosado of Fotogramas rated the film 4 out of 5 stars, billing it as "one of the most interesting and thoughtful music documentaries (and documentaries in general) of recent years".

== Accolades ==
Year	Award	Category	Nominee(s)	Result	Ref.
2024	30th Forqué Awards	Best Documentary Film		Nominated	
2025	80th CEC Medals	Best Documentary Film		Won	
2025	80th CEC Medals	Best New Director	Antón Álvarez	Nominated	
2025	80th CEC Medals	Best Music	Antón Álvarez, Yerai Cortés	Won	
2025	39th Goya Awards	Best Documentary Film		Won	
2025	39th Goya Awards	Best Original Song	"Los almendros" by Yerai Cortés and Antón Álvarez	Won	
2025	8th ALMA Awards	Best Screenplay in a Documentary Film	Antón Álvarez	Nominated	
2025	12th Platino Awards	Best Documentary Film		Nominated	

== See also ==
- List of Spanish films of 2024
