= Escape (2024 Spanish film) =

- Theatrical release poster
- Directed by: Rodrigo Cortés
- Written by: Rodrigo Cortés
- Based on: Escape by Enrique Rubio
- Produced by: Martin Scorsese; Rodrigo Cortés; Núria Valls; Adrián Guerra
- Starring: Mario Casas; Anna Castillo
- Cinematography: Rafa García
- Edited by: Rodrigo Cortés
- Music by: Víctor Reyes
- Production companies: Nostromo Pictures; Nostromo Proyecto 1 AIE; The Project
- Distributed by: Beta Fiction Spain
- Release dates: 27 September 2024 (Zinemaldia); 31 October 2024 (Spain)
- Countries: Spain; France
- Language: Spanish

Escape (/es'kape/) is a 2024 thriller film written, edited and directed by Rodrigo Cortés, based on the novel of the same name by Enrique Rubio and starring Mario Casas and Anna Castillo.

== Plot ==
The plot follows N., a broken young man hellbent on living in prison.

== Cast ==
- Mario Casas as N.
- Anna Castillo as Abril
- José Garcia
- Guillermo Toledo
- Josep Maria Pou
- Blanca Portillo
- José Sacristán
- David Lorente
- Albert Pla
- Juanjo Puigcorbé

== Production ==
Escape entails Cortés' return to Spanish-language filmmaking after his 2007 debut feature The Contestant. Pitched by Cortés as "The Count of Monte Cristo backwards, Papillon backwards or Escape from Alcatraz backwards", the film is a Nostromo Pictures (Adrián Guerra and Núria Valls) co-production with France's The Project, in association with Mogambo, Cosmopolitan TV, and with the participation of RTVE and Movistar Plus+. In May 2023, Martin Scorsese was announced as executive producer. Rafael García is the cinematographer. Shooting locations included Armuña de Tajuña. Filming had already wrapped by 22 July 2023.

== Release ==
Escape was presented at a RTVE gala held at the Kursaal Palace during the 72nd San Sebastián International Film Festival. It was also presented at the 57th Sitges Film Festival. Distributed by Beta Fiction Spain, the film is scheduled to be released theatrically in Spain on 31 October 2024.

== Reception ==
Javier Ocaña of El País found a connection to the likes of Wenceslao Fernández Flórez, Ramón Gómez de la Serna, Enrique Jardiel Poncela, and Antonio Orejudo, and wrote about a "formidable" first hour, and an "excessively diluted" second hour.

== Accolades ==
Year	Award	Category	Nominee(s)	Result	Ref.
2024	30th Forqué Awards	Best Actor in a Film	Mario Casas	Nominated	
2025	12th Feroz Awards	Best Comedy Film		Nominated	
2025	12th Feroz Awards	Best Supporting Actress in a Film	Anna Castillo	Nominated	
2025	12th Feroz Awards	Best Supporting Actor in a Film	José Sacristán	Nominated	
2025	79th CEC Medals	Best Adapted Screenplay	Rodrigo Cortés	Pending	

== See also ==
- List of Spanish films of 2024
