= Querer =

- Promotional release poster
- Created by: Alauda Ruiz de Azúa; Eduard Sola; Júlia de Paz
- Written by: Alauda Ruiz de Azúa; Eduard Sola; Júlia de Paz
- Directed by: Alauda Ruiz de Azúa
- Starring: Nagore Aranburu; Pedro Casablanc; Miguel Bernardeau; Iván Pellicer; Loreto Mauleón
- Country of origin: Spain
- Original language: Spanish
- No. of episodes: 4

Production
- Executive producers: Juan Moreno; Koldo Zuazua
- Cinematography: Sergi Gallardo
- Production companies: Movistar Plus+; Kowalski Films; Feelgood Media

Original release
- Release: 17 October 2024

Querer is a 2024 Spanish drama television miniseries co-created, co-written, and directed by Alauda Ruiz de Azúa. It stars Nagore Aranburu, Pedro Casablanc, Miguel Bernardeau, Iván Pellicer, and Loreto Mauleón.

== Plot ==
After thirty years of marriage, Miren Torres files criminal charges against her husband Íñigo Gorosmendi for continued sexual assault, causing a deep family rift, also involving the couple's two sons Aitor and Jon.

== Cast ==
- Nagore Aranburu as Miren Torres
- Pedro Casablanc as Íñigo Gorosmendi
- Miguel Bernardeau as Aitor
- Iván Pellicer as Jon
- Loreto Mauleón as Paula
- Natalia Huarte as Izaskun

== Production ==
Querer was produced by Movistar Plus+ alongside Kowalski Films and Feelgood Media. Shooting began in October 2023 in Bilbao.

== Release ==
Querer made it to a non-competitive slot of the 72nd San Sebastián International Film Festival for a pre-screening. The first episode debuted on Movistar Plus+ on 17 October 2024. ARTE France acquired rights to the series in its territories, setting a June 2025 release date in France. Flow released the series in Argentina on 11 September 2025.

== Reception ==
Raquel Hernández Luján of HobbyConsolas gave the series 92 points ('excellent'), writing that it "has a powerful discourse, masterful performances full of naturalness and a sober mise-en-scène well adjusted to the needs of the narrative".

== Accolades ==
Year	Award	Category	Nominee(s)	Result	Ref.
2024	30th Forqué Awards	Best Series		Won	
2024	30th Forqué Awards	Best Actress in a Series	Nagore Aranburu	Won	
2024	30th Forqué Awards	Best Actor in a Series	Pedro Casablanc	Won	
2025	12th Feroz Awards	Best Drama Series		Won	
2025	12th Feroz Awards	Best Main Actress in a Series	Nagore Aranburu	Won	
2025	12th Feroz Awards	Best Main Actor in a Series	Pedro Casablanc	Nominated	
2025	12th Feroz Awards	Best Supporting Actress in a Series	Loreto Mauleón	Nominated	
2025	12th Feroz Awards	Best Supporting Actor in a Series	Miguel Bernardeau	Nominated	
2025	12th Feroz Awards	Best Supporting Actor in a Series	Iván Pellicer	Nominated	
2025	12th Feroz Awards	Best Screenplay in a Series	Alauda Ruiz de Azúa, Eduard Solà, Júlia de Paz	Won	
2025	33rd Actors and Actresses Union Awards	Best Television Actor in a Secondary Role	Pedro Casablanc	Won	
2025	33rd Actors and Actresses Union Awards	Best Television Actor in a Secondary Role	Miguel Bernardeau	Nominated	
2025	33rd Actors and Actresses Union Awards	Best Television Actress in a Secondary Role	Loreto Mauleón	Nominated	
2025	33rd Actors and Actresses Union Awards	Best Television Actress in a Minor Role	Elisabet Gelabert	Won	
2025	2025 Series Mania	Grand Prize (International Competition)		Won	
2025	8th ALMA Awards	Best Screenplay in a Drama Series	Júlia de Paz, Alauda Ruiz de Azúa, Eduard Sola	Won	
2025	72nd Ondas Awards	Best Drama Series		Won	
2026	27th Iris Awards	Best Fiction		Won	
2026	27th Iris Awards	Best Actress	Nagore Aranburu	Nominated	
2026	27th Iris Awards	Best Actor	Miguel Bernardeau	Nominated	
2026	27th Iris Awards	Best Actor	Pedro Casablanc	Won	
2026	27th Iris Awards	Best Fiction Direction	Alauda Ruiz de Azúa	Won	
2026	27th Iris Awards	Best Fiction Production	Susana Herreras, Fran Araújo, Juan Moreno, Koldo Zuazua	Won	
2026	27th Iris Awards	Best Fiction Screenplay	Alauda Ruiz de Azúa, Eduard Sola, Júlia de Paz	Won	

== See also ==
- 2024 in Spanish television
