= Celeste (TV series) =

- Promotional release poster
- Genre: Comedy thriller
- Created by: Diego San José
- Written by: Diego San José; Daniel Castro; Oriol Puig
- Directed by: Elena Trapé
- Starring: Carmen Machi; Andrea Bayardo
- Country of origin: Spain
- Original language: Spanish
- No. of episodes: 6

Production
- Production company: 100 Balas

Original release
- Network: Movistar Plus+
- Release: 14 November – 28 November 2024

Celeste is a Spanish comedy thriller television series created by Diego San José and directed by Elena Trapé starring Carmen Machi and Andrea Bayardo.

== Plot ==
Sara Santano, a legendary tax inspector about to retire, is due for one last work investigating a purported case of tax evasion involving Latin music star Celeste. Santano is tasked with demonstrating that the latter spent more than 184 days in Spain in the last year, thus making Spain Celeste's tax residence.

== Cast ==
- Carmen Machi as Sara Santano
- Andrea Bayardo as Celeste
- Manolo Solo as Toni
- Antonio Durán Morris
- Aixa Villagrán
- Clara Sans as Dani
- Jesús Noguero
- Marc Soler

== Production ==
Created by Diego San José, Celeste is a 100 Balas (The Mediapro Studio) production. San José set himself the challenge of creating a gripping thriller set in "one of the greyest environments in our culture", billing the series as "Zodiac, but with the IRPF". A building in San Sebastián de los Reyes stood in for the Agencia Tributaria headquarters in Guzmán el Bueno. The six-episode series was directed by Elena Trapé.

== Release ==
The series received a pre-screening at the Anoeta Velodrome during the 72nd San Sebastián International Film Festival on 22 September 2024. It debuted on Movistar Plus+ on 14 November 2024.

It was released in France by ARTE on 6 March 2026.

== Reception ==
Beatriz Martínez of Infobae deemed Celeste to be one of "the winning series of the season", "which is ready to surprise and charm viewers with all its small and large occurrences, with its transparency, its sincerity and its daily approach to our lives' miseries".

Álvaro Onieva of Fotogramas rated the series 9 out of 10 points, writing that "Diego San José proves to be one of the most intelligent and sharpest screenwriters [in Spain] and leaves us with one of the most remarkable series so far this year".

== Accolades ==
Year	Award	Category	Nominee(s)	Result	Ref.
2024	30th Forqué Awards	Best Actress in a Series	Carmen Machi	Nominated	
2025	12th Feroz Awards	Best Comedy Series		Won	
2025	12th Feroz Awards	Best Main Actress in a Series	Carmen Machi	Nominated	
2025	12th Feroz Awards	Best Supporting Actress in a Series	Clara Sans	Nominated	
2025	12th Feroz Awards	Best Supporting Actor in a Series	Manolo Solo	Nominated	
2025	12th Feroz Awards	Best Screenplay in a Series	Diego San José, Daniel Castro, Oriol Puig	Nominated	
2025	33rd Actors and Actresses Union Awards	Best Television Actress in a Secondary Role	Clara Sans	Nominated	
2025	2025 Series Mania	Best Series (International Panorama)		Won	
2025	2025 Series Mania	Best Actress (International Panorama)	Carmen Machi	Won	
2025	8th ALMA Awards	Best Screenplay in a Comedy Series	Diego San José, Daniel Castro, Oriol Puig	Won	
2025	72nd Ondas Awards	Best Comedy Series		Won	
2026	27th Iris Awards	Best Fiction Direction	Elena Trapé	Nominated	
2026	27th Iris Awards	Best Actress	Carmen Machi	Won	
2026	32nd Forqué Awards	Best Series		Pending	
2026	32nd Forqué Awards	Best Actress in a Series	Carmen Machi	Pending	
2026	32nd Forqué Awards	Best Actor in a Series	Manolo Solo	Pending	

== See also ==
- 2024 in Spanish television
