= Buffalo Kids =

- Theatrical release poster
- Directed by: Pedro Solís; Juan Jesús García "Galo"
- Screenplay by: Jordi Gasull; Javier Barreira
- Based on: Cuerdas by Pedro Solís
- Produced by: Clever Beretta Custodio; Ricardo Marco Budé; Francisco Celma; Jordi Gasull; Toni Novella; Jaime Ortiz de Artiñano; Rosa Pérez; Marc Sabé; Ignacio Salazar-Simpson
- Starring: Alisha Weir; Conor MacNeill; Gemma Arterton; Sean Bean; Stephen Graham
- Edited by: Emily Killick
- Music by: Fernando Velázquez
- Production companies: 4Cats Pictures; Atresmedia Cine; Anangu Grup; Little Big Boy AIE; Mogambo Productions; Cinema Management Group
- Distributed by: Warner Bros. Pictures
- Release dates: 14 June 2024 (Annecy); 14 August 2024 (Spain)
- Running time: 82 minutes
- Country: Spain
- Language: English
- Box office: $9.8 million

Buffalo Kids is a 2024 Spanish animated adventure film directed by Pedro Solís and Juan Galocha.

== Plot ==
Set in the 19th century, the plot follows the adventures of two orphaned Irish siblings (Tom and Mary) who emigrate to the United States to reunite with their uncle Niall in New York City. When Niall doesn't show up at the docks, Tom and Mary set out to find him with the company of a stray dog, Sparky, sneaking on board a train with a group of orphans when they cannot afford a ticket. During the journey, Mary befriends non-verbal paraplegic boy Nick, who is rejected from his initial possible family due to his disability. The orphans' supervisor, Eleanor, learns of their circumstances and assures them she won't give them away to the train staff.

When the train stops to refuel, Mary takes Nick off the train to touch the nearby buffalo, but the train departs without them on board as everyone else in the carriage was asleep. Tom is able to get a nearby cart in working order and travel after the train, but they find it deserted after an apparent Indian attack. The children have a close call with a pack of coyotes that leaves Tom with an injured leg, and when they stop to collect water they are captured by an Indian tribe. However, the tribe proves to be friendly, and affirms that they had nothing to do with the train attack.

Tom, Mary and Nick are eventually led to another group of white men, but these men turn out to be the bandits responsible for attacking the train, having taken the passengers as slave labour to work in a mine. When the children are reunited with the orphans and Eleanor, one of the other prisoners is revealed to be Tom and Mary's uncle Niall, who was captured from another train.

Tom, Mary and Nick manage to escape the mine and contact a nearby fortress for help, as well as the Indian tribe. The two groups work together to stage an assault and rescue the prisoners before the bandits can destroy the now-depleted mine to cover up their actions. Niall, Tom and Mary agree to remain as a family, and Eleanor not only joins them but invites Nick to come along as well.

== Voice cast ==
English cast

- Alisha Weir as Mary
- Conor MacNeill as Tom
- Gemma Arterton as Elenor
- Sean Bean as Outlaw Wilson
- Stephen Graham as Uncle Niall

Spanish cast

- Mía Pérez
- Jaume Solà
- Javier Cassi
- Federico Bote
- Miguel Ángel Jenner

== Production ==
Written by Jordi Gasull and Javier Barreira, the screenplay of Buffalo Kids is based on Pedro Solís' short film Cuerdas, which is in turn inspired by the real-life relationship between Solís' children, Alejandra and Nico (with Mary and Nick respectively being their alter egos in the film). The film is a 4Cats Pictures, Atresmedia Cine, Anangu Grup, Little Big Boy AIE, and Mogambo Productions production.

== Release ==
The film premiered at the Annecy International Animation Film Festival on 14 June 2024. It also made it to the animation slate of the 26th Shanghai International Film Festival for its Asian premiere, and to the 'Elements +6' competition of the 54th Giffoni Film Festival. Distributed by Warner Bros. Pictures, it was released theatrically in Spain on 14 August 2024. It had a €0.59 million (88,053 admissions) box office gross in its opening weekend, with a total of €1.2 million (187,508 admissions) when adding Wednesday 14 and Thursday 15 figures. In the starting month of theatrical window, it drew over 600,000 admissions. Warner Bros. also handled distribution in the United Kingdom and Ireland (setting a 11 October 2024 release) and Italy (setting a 31 October 2024 release).

The film was also sold to Best Film (Poland), NOS Lusomundo (Portugal), The Film Group (Greece), MegaCom Film (former Yugoslavia), Filmhouse (Israel), Front Row Entertainment (Middle East), Nathan Studios (Philippines), and ARP Sélection (France).

Viva Pictures handled U.S. distribution releasing theatrically on 6 February 2026. The film had a per screen average of $203 on its opening weekend in U.S. theaters for a total of $152,939 on 750 screens.

== Reception ==
Raquel Hernández Luján of HobbyConsolas gave the film 85 points ('very good'), declaring it "an excellent animated film aimed at children's audiences", very nice and "very enjoyable for its human and production values".

Javier Ocaña of Cinemanía rated the film 3 out of 5 stars, considering that, while "soft and ultimately relying too much on chance" vis-à-vis the outcome of the story, it is "entertaining, and it has "some nice gags" and an "excellent pace".

Juan Pando of Fotogramas rated the film 3 out of 5 stars, positively writing about how the film "will make the kids feel like they are part of a great adventure", while negatively citing how it displays an "overly politically-correct vision of the West".

Catherine Bray of The Guardian rated the film 3 out of 5 stars, writing that it is "amiable and rattles along nicely enough without ever really surprising anyone".

== Accolades ==
Year	Award	Category	Nominee(s)	Result	Ref.
2024	30th Forqué Awards	Best Animation Film		Nominated	
2025	17th Gaudí Awards	Best Animation Film		Nominated	
2025	39th Goya Awards	Best Animated Film		Nominated	
2025	39th Goya Awards	Best Original Song	"Show Me" by Fernando Velázquez	Nominated	

== See also ==
- List of Spanish films of 2024
