= The New Years =

Spanish television series

- Promotional release poster for Part 1
- Spanish: Los años nuevos
- Created by: Sara Cano; Paula Fabra; Rodrigo Sorogoyen
- Directed by: Rodrigo Sorogoyen; Sandra Romero; David Martín de los Santos
- Starring: Iria del Río; Francesco Carril
- Country of origin: Spain
- Original language: Spanish
- No. of episodes: 10

Production
- Production companies: Movistar Plus+; Caballo Films

Original release
- Network: Movistar Plus+
- Release: 28 November – 12 December 2024

The New Years (Spanish: Los años nuevos) is a Spanish relationship drama television series created by Sara Cano, Paula Fabra, and Rodrigo Sorogoyen. It stars Iria del Río and Francesco Carril.

== Plot ==
The plot explores Ana and Óscar's life as a couple throughout their 30s over the course of 10 New Year's Eves.

== Cast ==
- Iria del Río as Ana
- Francesco Carril as Óscar
- Pablo Gómez-Pando es Guille
- Lucía Martín Abello es Vero
- Ana Telenti es Palo
- Anna Alarcón es Ros
- Vladimir Perrin es Manu
- Ana Labordeta es Isabel
- Benjamín Prado es Eduardo
- María Maroto es Alicia
- Olaya Caldera es Rocío
- Paula Iglesias es Irene

== Production ==
The New Years was created by Sara Cano, Paula Fabra and Rodrigo Sorogoyen, with Marina Rodríguez Colás and Antonio Rojano also participating in writing duties. The 10 episodes were directed by Sorogoyen, Sandra Romero, and David Martín de los Santos. It is a Movistar Plus+ original series produced in collaboration with Caballo Films and with the association of ARTE France. Shooting began on 2 October 2023. The series was shot across locations in the Madrid region, Castilla–La Mancha, Lyon, and Berlin.

The shooting of the series briefly appears in the film The Other Way Around.

== Release ==
The New Years received a pre-screening at the 81st Venice International Film Festival in September 2024 in a non-competitive official selection slot. The series also made it to the slate of the 69th Valladolid International Film Festival for its Spanish premiere. Episodes 1–5 were selected for screening at the 37th Tokyo International Film Festival. The series was released on Movistar Plus+, with the first half set for a 28 November 2024 debut, and the second half for a 12 December 2024 one. ARTE France set a November 2025 release date in French territories. Mubi acquired distribution rights for North America, Latin America, the United Kingdom, Ireland, the Netherlands, Turkey, Australia, New Zealand, and India.

== Reception ==
On the review aggregator website Rotten Tomatoes, 100% of 13 critics' reviews are positive, with an average rating of 8.5/10.

== Accolades ==
Year	Award	Category	Nominee(s)	Result	Ref.
2024	30th Forqué Awards	Best Actress in a Series	Iria del Río	Nominated	
2025	12th Feroz Awards	Best Drama Series		Nominated	
2025	12th Feroz Awards	Best Main Actor in a Series	Francesco Carril	Nominated	
2025	12th Feroz Awards	Best Main Actress in a Series	Iria del Río	Nominated	
2025	12th Feroz Awards	Best Screenplay in a Series	Rodrigo Sorogoyen, Sara Cano, Paula Fabra, Marina Rodríguez Colás, Antonio Rojano	Nominated	
2025	33rd Actors and Actresses Union Awards	Best Television Actress in a Leading Role	Iria del Río	Nominated	
2025	8th ALMA Awards	Best Screenplay in a Drama Series	Sara Cano, Paula Fabra, Rodrigo Sorogoyen, Marina Rodríguez Colás, Antonio Rojano	Nominated	

== See also ==
- 2024 in Spanish television
