= Policías, en el corazón de la calle =

Spanish period drama television series

- Genre: Action; Police drama
- Country of origin: Spain
- Original language: Spanish
- No. of seasons: 6
- No. of episodes: 83

Production
- Executive producers: Manuel Valdivia; César Rodríguez Blanco; Chus Vallejo
- Production company: Globomedia

Original release
- Network: Antena 3
- Release: 11 January 2000 – 16 January 2003

Policías, en el corazón de la calle or simply Policías is a Spanish police drama television series. Produced by Globomedia, its 6 seasons aired from January 2000 to January 2003 on Antena 3.

== Premise ==
The fiction was set around a police station in Madrid, focusing on the work and relationships of the police agents. Next to the police station there is a medical center where the police agents also interact with the medical workers.

== Cast ==
- Josep Maria Pou as Héctor Ferrer.
- Ana Fernández as Lucía Ramos.
- Adolfo Fernández as Carlos Gándara Guzmán.
- Natalia Millán as Lola Ruiz.
- Toni Acosta as Vera Muñoz.
- Laura Pamplona as Marina Blasco.
- Pedro Casablanc as Manuel Klimov, "Ruso".
- Diego Martín as Jaime Castro.
- Daniel Guzmán as Rafa Trujillo.
- Lola Dueñas.
- Rodolfo Sancho.
- Melani Olivares as Laura.
- Nathalie Poza.
- Sonia Castelo.
- Héctor Colomé.
- Gloria Muñoz as Mercedes.

== Production and release ==
Produced by Globomedia for Antena 3, its release trailed behind another police series aired in the rival channel Telecinco, El comisario. The series premiered on 11 January 2000. The broadcasting run ended on 16 January 2003, after 6 seasons and 83 episodes.

Manuel Valdivia, César Rodríguez Blanco and Chus Vallejo were credited as executive producers. Guillermo Fernández, Salvador Calvo, Manuel Valdivia, Jesús del Cerro and Sandra Gallego were among those directing the episodes, whereas Nacho Cabana, Chus Vallejo, J. M. Ruiz Córdoba, Beatriz G. Cruz and Verónica Viñé were part of the scriptwriting team.

== Awards and nominations ==
Year	Award	Category	Nominee(s)	Result	Ref.
2001	10th Actors and Actresses Union Awards	Best Leading Performance (TV)	Josep Maria Pou	Nominated	
2001	10th Actors and Actresses Union Awards	Best Supporting Performance (TV)	Pedro Casablanc	Nominated	
2001	10th Actors and Actresses Union Awards	Best Supporting Performance (TV)	Lola Dueñas	Nominated	
