= Yerai Cortés =

Spanish guitarist and composer (born 1995)

Yerái Cortés
- Cortés at the 2026 Latin Grammy Awards

Background information
- Born: Yerái Cortés Merino; 24 May 1995 (age 31); Alicante, Valencian Community, Spain
- Genre: New flamenco
- Occupation: Musician
- Instrument: Guitar

Yerái Cortés Merino (born 24 May 1995) is a Spanish guitarist and composer. He is one of the leading figures of contemporary flamenco.

== Career ==
Cortés began his career in Madrid, performing in some of the city's most prestigious flamenco tablaos, such as Las Carboneras, Villa Rosa, Casa Patas, and Corral de la Morería. He has also performed in important theaters in Spain, including the Teatro de Bellas Artes in Madrid, the Teatro Coliseum in Barcelona, and the Teatro Lope de Vega in Seville.

Throughout his career, Cortés has accompanied prominent artists such as La Negra, La Tana, Richard Bona, Marcos Flores, Alfonso Losa, Manuel Liñán, Las Hermanas Bautista, Chuchito Valdés, Javier Colina, and Farruquito. These collaborations have allowed him to explore different facets of flamenco and merge it with other musical genres.

In recent years, Cortés has worked with musicians of various styles and participated in innovative projects. Of particular note is his collaboration with C. Tangana, whom he accompanied on his Sin cantar ni afinar tour and with whom he has explored new frontiers in flamenco music. Cortés was nominated for the Best New Artist award at the 2025 Latin Grammys.

=== Compositions and projects ===
In addition to being a performer, Cortés is a composer and producer. He has created and performed pieces such as La Zapatera, alongside Juan Debel, and has collaborated on Vanesa Coloma's FlamenKlorica show. Her work is characterized by the fusion of traditional styles with modern elements.

In 2021, Cortés received the Guitarra con Alma award at the Jerez Festival for his participation in Rocío Molina's Al Fondo Riela, a recognition that recognizes his talent and contribution to contemporary flamenco.

== Film ==
In 2024, Cortés starred in the documentary La guitarra flamenca de Yerai Cortés, directed by Antón Álvarez (C. Tangana). The film explores a family secret and combines a unique musical experience with a narrative about passion, love, and forgiveness. The film was presented at the San Sebastián International Film Festival.

== Awards and nominations ==
Goya Awards

Year	Category	Production	Result
2024	Best Original Song	«Los almendros», from La guitarra flamenca de Yerai Cortés	Won

CEC Awards

Year	Category	Production	Result
2024	Best Music	La guitarra flamenca de Yerai Cortés	Won

Latin Grammy Awards

Year	Category	Result
2025	Best New Artist	Nominated
