= Idol Affair =

- Theatrical release poster
- Spanish: Buscando a Coque
- Directed by: Teresa Bellón; César F. Calvillo
- Written by: Teresa Bellón; César F. Calvillo
- Produced by: Beatriz Bodegas
- Starring: Alexandra Jiménez; Hugo Silva; Coque Malla
- Cinematography: Javier Salmones
- Edited by: Irene Blecua
- Production companies: La Canica Films; Agosto la película AIE; Inti Films; Bestacosta Productions
- Distributed by: Filmax
- Release date: 14 February 2024 (Spain)
- Countries: Spain; United States
- Language: Spanish

Idol Affair (Spanish: Buscando a Coque) is a 2024 Spanish-American romantic comedy film written and directed by Teresa Bellón and César F. Calvillo which stars Alexandra Jiménez and Hugo Silva alongside Coque Malla.

== Plot ==
The happy domestic relationship between Teresa and César is upended after Teresa confessed having banged Coque Malla, César's longtime idol. They travel to Miami to look for Coque while they rethink their relationship.

== Cast ==
- Alexandra Jiménez as Teresa
- Hugo Silva as César
- Coque Malla as himself
- David Lorente as taxista ('taxi driver')
- Cristina Soria as hermana de Teresa ('Teresa's sister')
- Marta Fernández Muro as madre de Teresa ('Teresa's mother')
- José Troncoso as tatuador ('tattoo artist')
- Betiza Bismark

== Production ==
The film is a Spanish-American co-production by Agosto, la película AIE and La Canica Films alongside Bestacosta Productions and Inti Films, Inc. It had the participation of RTVE and Movistar Plus+, the collaboration of Paramount, the backing from ICAA and support by Ayuntamiento de Madrid. Shooting locations included Miami and Madrid.

== Release ==
Distributed by Filmax, the film was released theatrically in Spain on 14 February 2024.

== Reception ==
Javier Ocaña of Cinemanía rated the film 3 out of 5 stars deeming it to be "a textbook romantic comedy, with a classic structure, remarkable dialogues and situations between the everyday and the absurd, with a hint of tenderness".

Pablo Vázquez of Fotogramas rated the film 3 out of 5 stars, deeming it to be "very pleasant, luminous", but less "Sandlerian" or "Smithian" than the reviewer would have liked.

== Accolades ==
Year	Award	Category	Nominee(s)	Result	Ref.
2025	12th Feroz Awards	Best Comedy Film		Nominated	
2025	12th Platino Awards	Best Ibero-American Comedy Film		Won	
2025	8th ALMA Awards	Best Screenplay in a Comedy Film	Teresa Bellón, César F. Calvillo	Nominated	

== See also ==
- List of Spanish films of 2024
