= Lola Lafon =

French writer

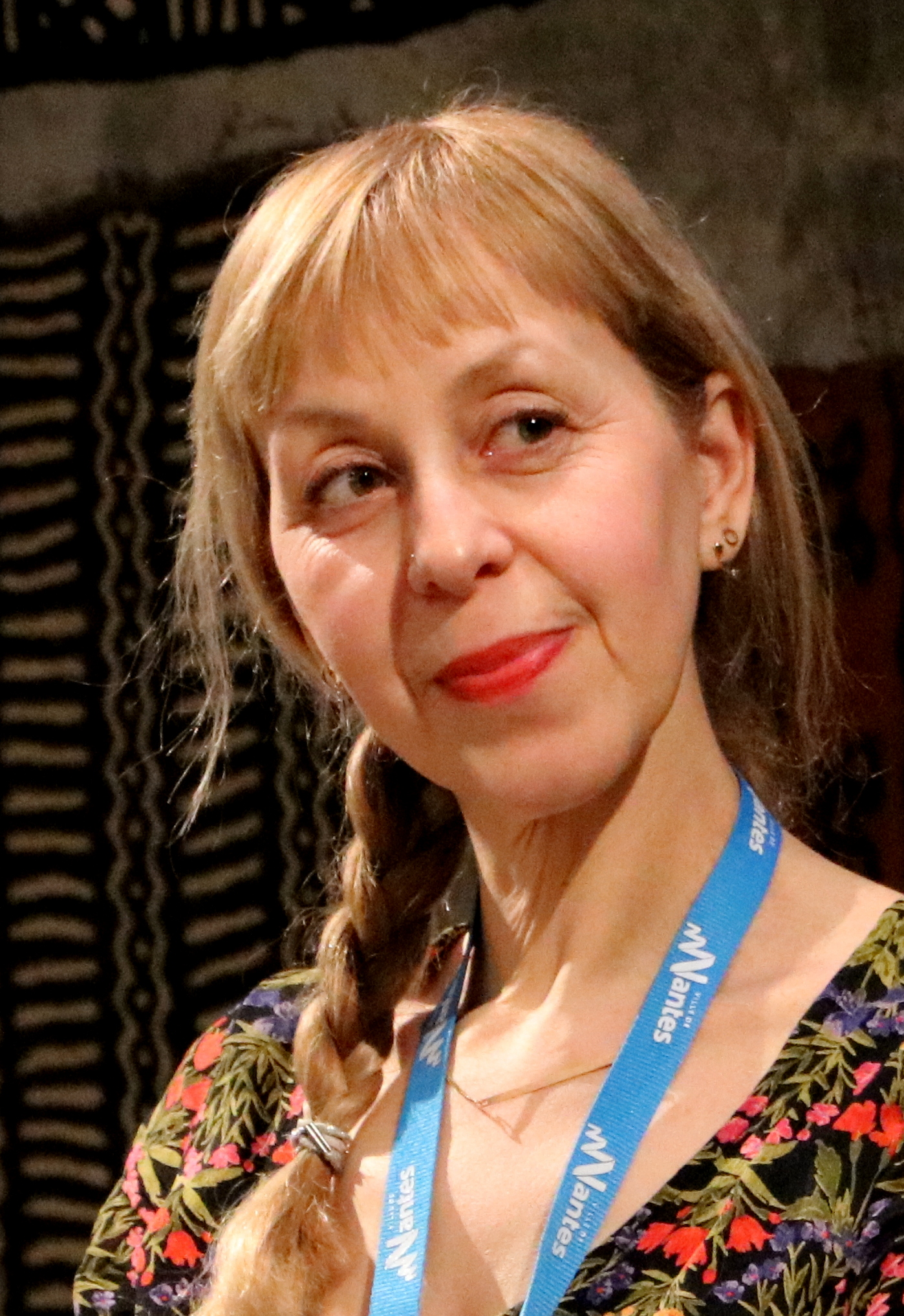
- Lola Lafon in 2018

Lola Lafon (born 1974) is a French writer and musician.

She was born in northern France, but grew up in Sofia and Bucharest. She is the author of five novels. Her best known novel The Little Communist Who Never Smiled is based on the life of the champion gymnast Nadia Comăneci. It has been translated into numerous languages and won ten literary prizes in France, among them the Prix Ouest-France Étonnants Voyageurs, the Jules Rimet Prize and the Prix Version Fémina.

She is an anarchist and feminist.

== See also ==
- Anarchism in France

== Written works ==
- Lafon, Lola (2003). Une fièvre impossible à négocier. Paris: Flammarion. ISBN 2-08-068504-X. OCLC 402338897.
- Lafon, Lola (2007). De ça je me console. [Paris, France]: Flammarion. ISBN 978-2-08-120682-3. OCLC 170907213.
- Lafon, Lola (2011). Nous sommes les oiseaux de la tempête qui s'annonce. [Paris]: Flammarion. ISBN 978-2-08-122122-2. OCLC 708737610.
- Lafon, Lola,. (2014). La petite communiste qui ne souriait jamais roman. Arles: Actes Sud. ISBN 978-2-330-02728-5. OCLC 870299362.
- Lafon, Lola (2017). Mercy, Mary, Patty : roman. Arles. ISBN 978-2-330-08178-2. OCLC 1003643977.
- Lafon, Lola (2020). Chavirer. Cantook Station. [Place of publication not identified]. ISBN 978-2-330-13935-3. OCLC 1251929042.
- Lafon, Lola (2022). Quand tu écouteras cette chanson. Paris. ISBN 978-2-234-09247-1. OCLC 1342098111.
