= Alauda Ruiz de Azúa =

Spanish filmmaker (born 1978)

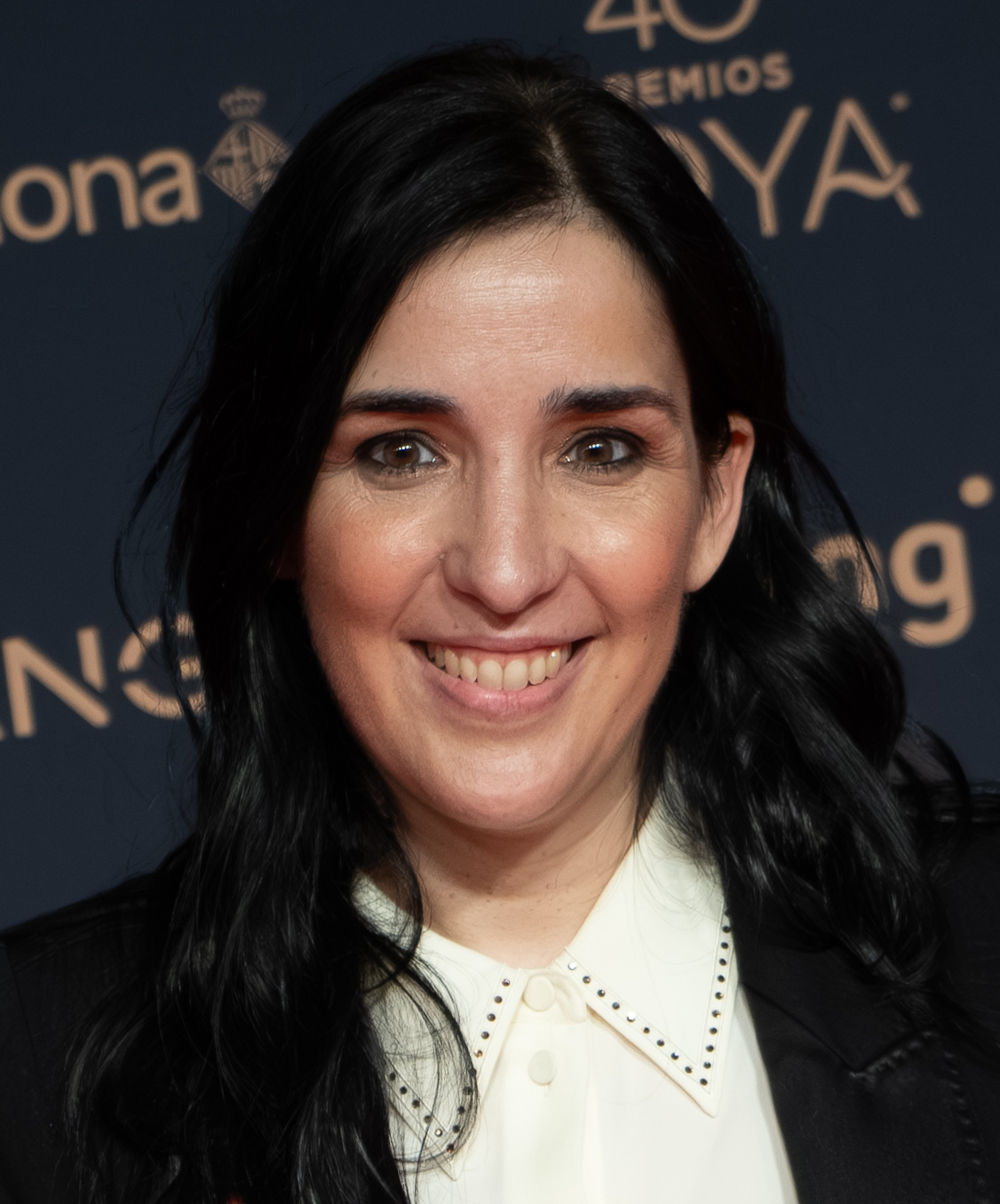
- Ruiz de Azúa at the 2026 Goya Awards
- Born: 1978 (age 47–48); Barakaldo, Biscay, Spain
- Education: University of Deusto; ECAM
- Occupations: Film director; screenwriter
- Known for: Lullaby (2022); Sundays (2025)

Alauda Ruiz de Azúa Arteche (born 1978) is a Spanish filmmaker. She won the 2023 Goya Award for Best New Director for her full-length debut Lullaby (2022), which was met with critical acclaim. Her 2025 film, Sundays, earned two Goya Awards and two other awards.

== Early life and education ==
Alauda Ruiz de Azúa Arteche was born in Barakaldo, Biscay, in 1978.

She earned a licentiate degree in English philology from the University of Deusto and a degree in film direction from the ECAM.

== Career ==
Based in Madrid, she developed an early career in short films (including Clases particulares, Dicen, and Nena) and advertising. Shortly after presenting her debut feature film Lullaby at the Berlinale in February 2022, she wrapped shooting of her second feature Eres tú, a Netflix comedy written by Cristóbal Garrido and Adolfo Valor.

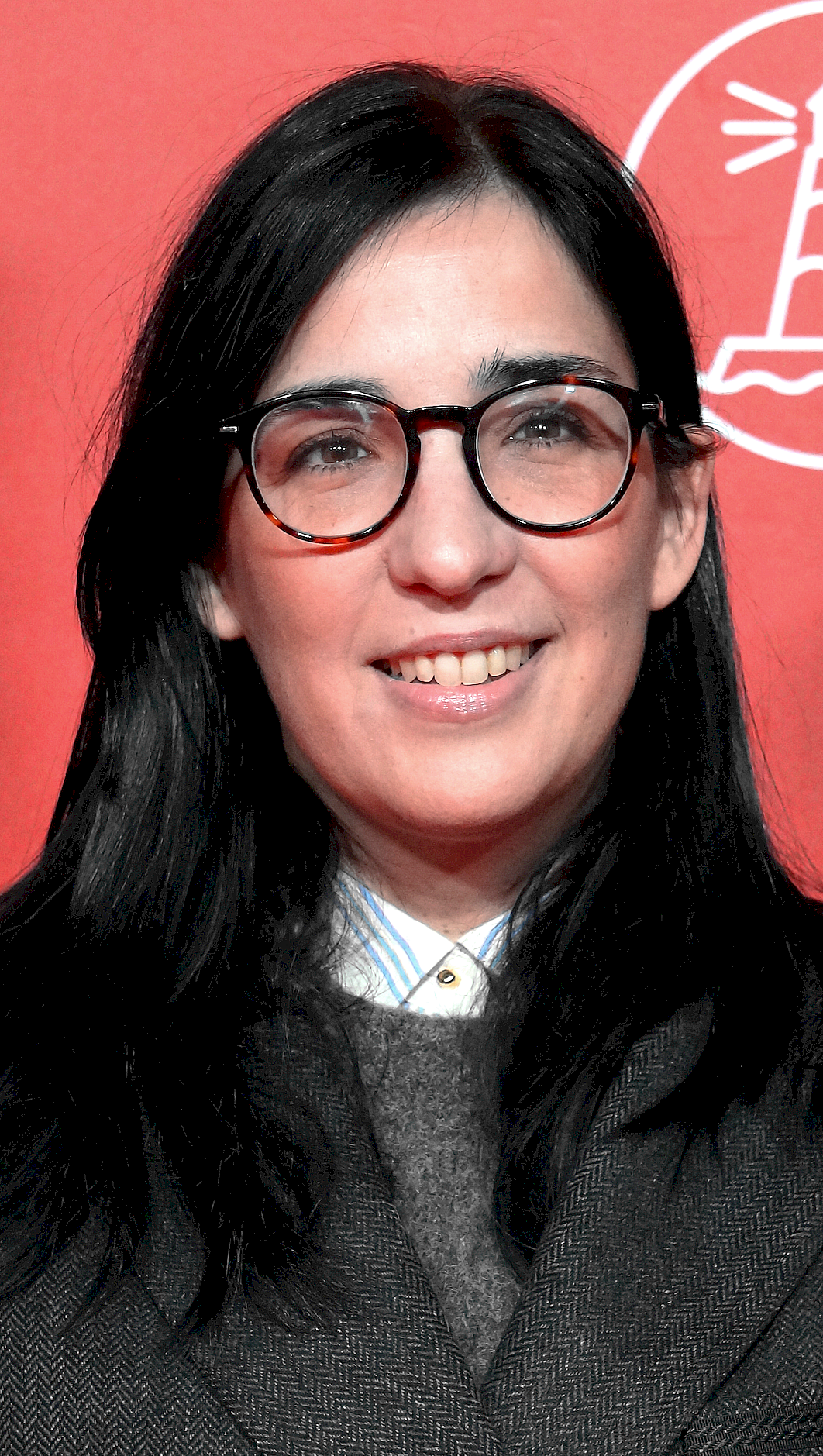
Ruiz de Azúa at 2026 Ostend Film Festival

== Recognition and awards ==
Lullaby (2022) earned critical acclaim, and won her the Goya Award for Best New Director.

== Works ==
Feature films

Year	Title	Director	Writer	Notes	Ref.
2022	Cinco lobitos (Lullaby)	Yes	Yes		
2023	Love at First Kiss (Eres tú)	Yes	No		
2025	Los domingos (Sundays)	Yes	Yes		

=== Television ===
Year	Title	Director	Writer	Notes	Ref.
2024	Querer	Yes	Yes	4-episode miniseries Also creator	

== Accolades ==
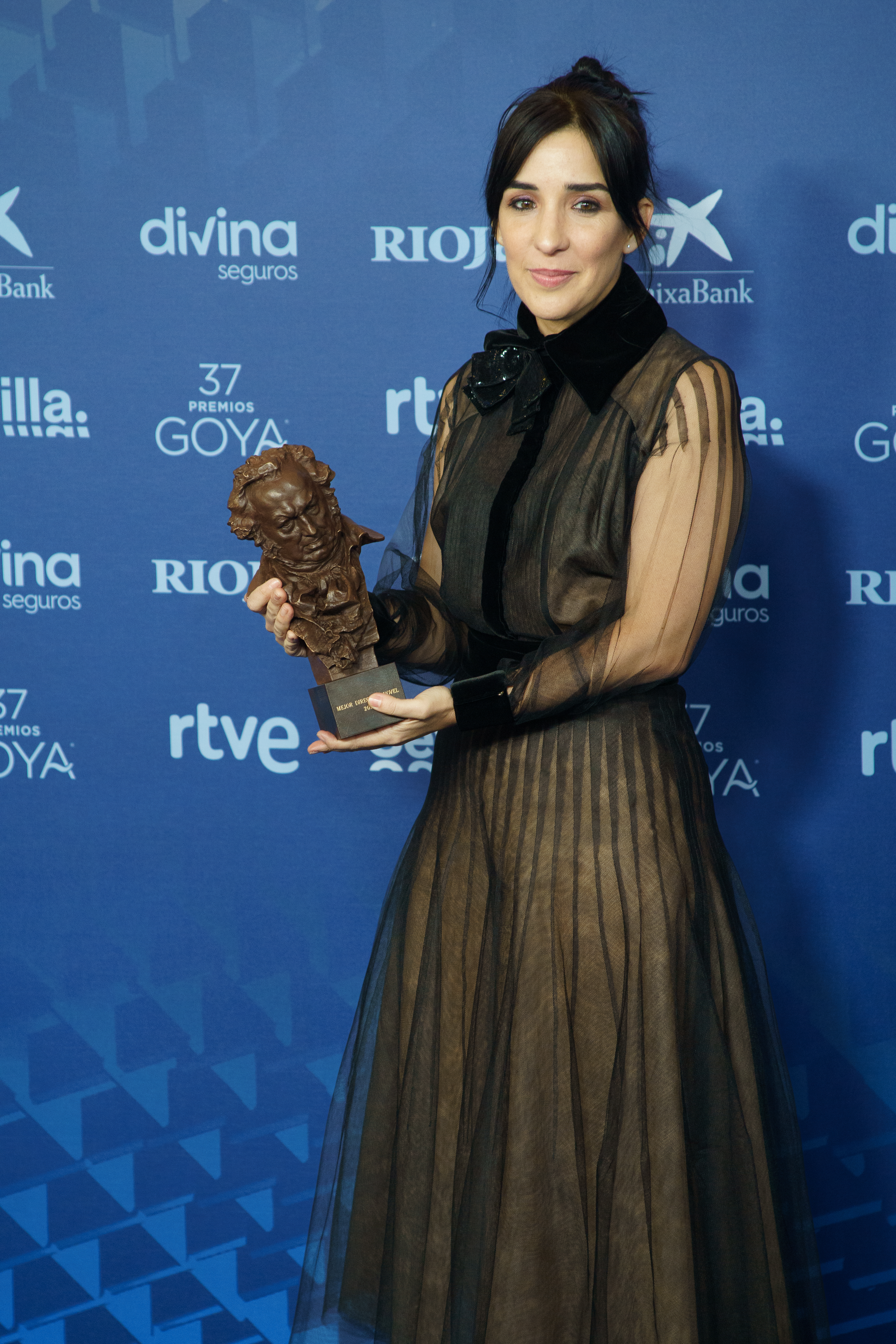
Ruiz de Azúa holding her Goya Award for Best New Director in 2023

Year	Award	Category	Nominated work	Result	Ref.
2022	25th Málaga Film Festival	Silver Biznaga for Best Screenplay	Lullaby	Won	
2023	10th Feroz Awards	Best Director	Lullaby	Nominated	
2023	10th Feroz Awards	Best Screenplay	Lullaby	Won	
2023	78th CEC Medals	Best New Director	Lullaby	Won	
2023	78th CEC Medals	Best Original Screenplay	Lullaby	Nominated	
2023	37th Goya Awards	Best New Director	Lullaby	Won	
2023	37th Goya Awards	Best Original Screenplay	Lullaby	Nominated	
2025	12th Feroz Awards	Best Screenplay in a Series	Querer	Won	
2026	13th Feroz Awards	Best Director	Sundays	Won	
2026	13th Feroz Awards	Best Screenplay	Sundays	Won	
2026	40th Goya Awards	Best Director	Sundays	Won	
2026	40th Goya Awards	Best Original Screenplay	Sundays	Won	
