= La casa (2024 film) =

- Theatrical release poster
- Directed by: Álex Montoya
- Screenplay by: Álex Montoya; Joana M. Ortueta
- Based on: La casa by Paco Roca
- Produced by: Álex Montoya; Sofía López; Óscar Bernácer; Joana M. Ortueta; Iván Martínez-Rufat; Jordi Llorca Llinares; Pilar Llorca Rubio
- Starring: David Verdaguer; Luis Callejo; Óscar de la Fuente; Olivia Molina; María Romanillos; Lorena López; Marta Belenguer; Jordi Aguilar; Tosca Montoya; Miguel Rellán
- Cinematography: Guillem Oliver
- Edited by: Álex Montoya; Lucía Casal
- Music by: Fernando Velázquez
- Production companies: Raw Pictures; Nakamura Films; Haciendo la casa AIE
- Distributed by: A Contracorriente Films
- Release dates: 5 March 2024 (Málaga); 1 May 2024 (Spain)
- Country: Spain
- Language: Spanish

La casa is a 2024 Spanish slice-of-life drama film directed by Álex Montoya based on the graphic novel of the same name by Paco Roca. Its ensemble cast features David Verdaguer, Luis Callejo, Óscar de la Fuente, Olivia Molina, María Romanillos, Lorena López, Marta Belenguer, Jordi Aguilar, Tosca Montoya, and Miguel Rellán.

== Plot ==
Three siblings, coping with the grief of their father's death in different ways, confront the dilemma of what to do with the house their father built.

== Cast ==
- David Verdaguer as José
- Luis Callejo as Antonio
- Óscar de la Fuente as Vicente
- Olivia Molina as Silvia
- María Romanillos as Ema
- Lorena López as Carla
- Marta Belenguer as Olga
- Jordi Aguilar as Cristóbal
- Miguel Rellán as Manolo

== Production ==
Montoya decided to shoot the film after being gifted the graphic novel, but according to him, it took him nearly seven years to develop the project. The film is a Raw Pictures, Nakamura Films, and Haciendo la casa AIE production, with the participation of RTVE, À Punt, and CreaSGR, the funding from ICAA, ICO, and the collaboration of IVC. Digital tweaks were used to de-age Miguel Rellán in some past scenes. It was shot in locations of the Valencia region, including the house in Olocau that inspired the story by Paco Roca.

== Release ==
The film was presented at the 27th Málaga Film Festival on 5 March 2024. Distributed by A Contracorriente Films, was released theatrically in Spain on 1 May 2024.

== Reception ==
On the review aggregator website Rotten Tomatoes, 100% of 5 critics' reviews are positive, with an average rating of 7.5/10.

Javier Ocaña of El País wrote that Montoya adapts Roca's work "with the calm, subtlety, verve, delicacy and truth of small great works".

Quim Casas of El Periódico de Catalunya rated the film 4 out of 5 stars, deeming it to be "an almost surgical drama, very restrained".

Irene Crespo of Cinemanía rated the film 3½ out of 5 stars, deeming it to be "the adaptation of the graphic novel that Paco Roca deserved".

Pere Vall of Fotogramas rated the film 4 out of 5 stars, highlighting some scenes featuring Verdaguer vs. Rellán and Verdaguer vs. de la Fuente as the best things about the film.

Fran González of Mondo Sonoro gave the film 9 out of 10 points considering it a "solid and plain candidate for best national film of the year" also pointing out that it manages to dignify "the already hackneyed label of intimate drama".

== Accolades ==
Year	Award	Category	Nominee(s)	Result	Ref.
2024	27th Málaga Film Festival	Best Screenplay	Álex Montoya, Joana M. Ortueta	Won	
2024	27th Málaga Film Festival	Best Music	Fernando Velázquez	Won	
2024	27th Málaga Film Festival	Audience Award		Won	
2024	27th Málaga Film Festival	Feroz Puerta Oscura Award		Won	
2025	12th Feroz Awards	Best Main Actor in a Film	David Verdaguer	Nominated	
2025	12th Feroz Awards	Best Supporting Actor in a Film	Óscar de la Fuente	Won	
2025	12th Feroz Awards	Best Original Soundtrack	Fernando Velázquez	Nominated	
2025	7th Lola Gaos Awards	Best Film		Won	
2025	7th Lola Gaos Awards	Best Director	Álex Montoya	Won	
2025	7th Lola Gaos Awards	Best Screenplay	Álex Montoya, Joana M. Ortueta	Won	
2025	7th Lola Gaos Awards	Best Actor	David Verdaguer	Won	
2025	7th Lola Gaos Awards	Best Actress	Lorena López	Won	
2025	7th Lola Gaos Awards	Best Supporting Actor	Óscar de la Fuente	Won	
2025	7th Lola Gaos Awards	Best Supporting Actor	Luis Callejo	Nominated	
2025	7th Lola Gaos Awards	Best Supporting Actress	María Romanillos	Won	
2025	7th Lola Gaos Awards	Best Editing and Post-Production	Álex Montoya, Lucía Casal, Víctor Suñer	Won	
2025	7th Lola Gaos Awards	Best Cinematography and Lighting	Guillem Oliver	Nominated	
2025	7th Lola Gaos Awards	Best Production Supervision	Gloria Guillot	Nominated	
2025	7th Lola Gaos Awards	Best Art Direction	Rafa Jannone Forés	Nominated	
2025	7th Lola Gaos Awards	Best Sound	José Manuel Sospedra, Iván Martínez-Rufat, Maider Blázquez	Won	
2025	7th Lola Gaos Awards	Best Costume Design	Giovanna Ribes	Nominated	
2025	7th Lola Gaos Awards	Best Makeup and Hairstyles	Esther Guillem, Piluca Guillem, David Ambit	Nominated	
2025	7th Lola Gaos Awards	Youth Prize for Best Film		Won	
2025	79th CEC Medals	Best Adapted Screenplay	Álex Montoya, Joana M. Ortueta	Nominated	
2025	79th CEC Medals	Best Actor	David Verdaguer	Nominated	
2025	39th Goya Awards	Best Adapted Screenplay	Álex Montoya, Joana M. Ortueta	Nominated	
2025	39th Goya Awards	Best Supporting Actor	Óscar de la Fuente	Nominated	

== See also ==
- List of Spanish films of 2024
