= Nagore Aranburu =

Basque actor

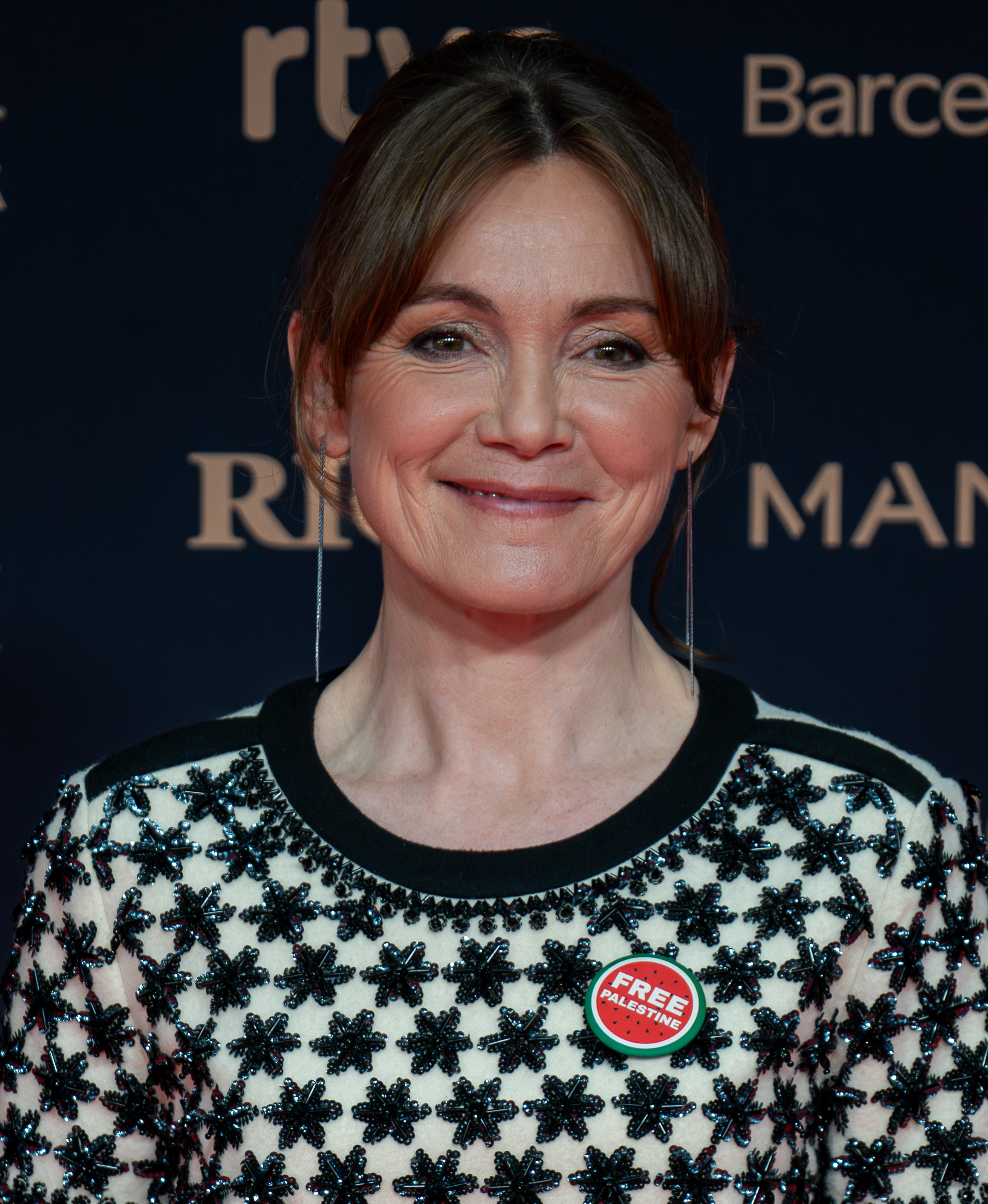
- Aranburu in 2026
- Born: 23 March 1976 (age 50); Azpeitia, Gipuzkoa, Spain
- Occupation: Actress

Nagore Aranburu (born 23 March 1976) is a Basque screen and stage actress.

== Life and career ==
Aranburu was born in Azpeitia, Gipuzkoa, on 23 March 1976. She debuted on stage at age 12 in the theatre group Antxieta. She made her film debut as an actress in Ione sube al cielo (1999). In 1999, she won the Best New Actress Award from the Basque Actors Union. In addition to her acting career, Aranburu also wrote screenplays for ETB television shows such as Wazemank and Brinkola.

She starred in the Basque-language drama Loreak (2014) portraying Ane. In the Basque epic fantasy adventure film Irati (2022) she appeared as Oneka, the mother of protagonist Eneko, remarried to a Muslim emir. Her film career also included performances in Ane Is Missing (2020), Official Competition (2021), The Chapel (2023), and Maspalomas (2025).

Aranburu's acclaimed leading performance in the Movistar Plus+ miniseries Querer (2024) as a woman who decides to report her husband for sexual violence earned her a Forqué Award and Feroz Award for Best Main Actress in a Series.
