= Eduard Sola =

Spanish screenwriter

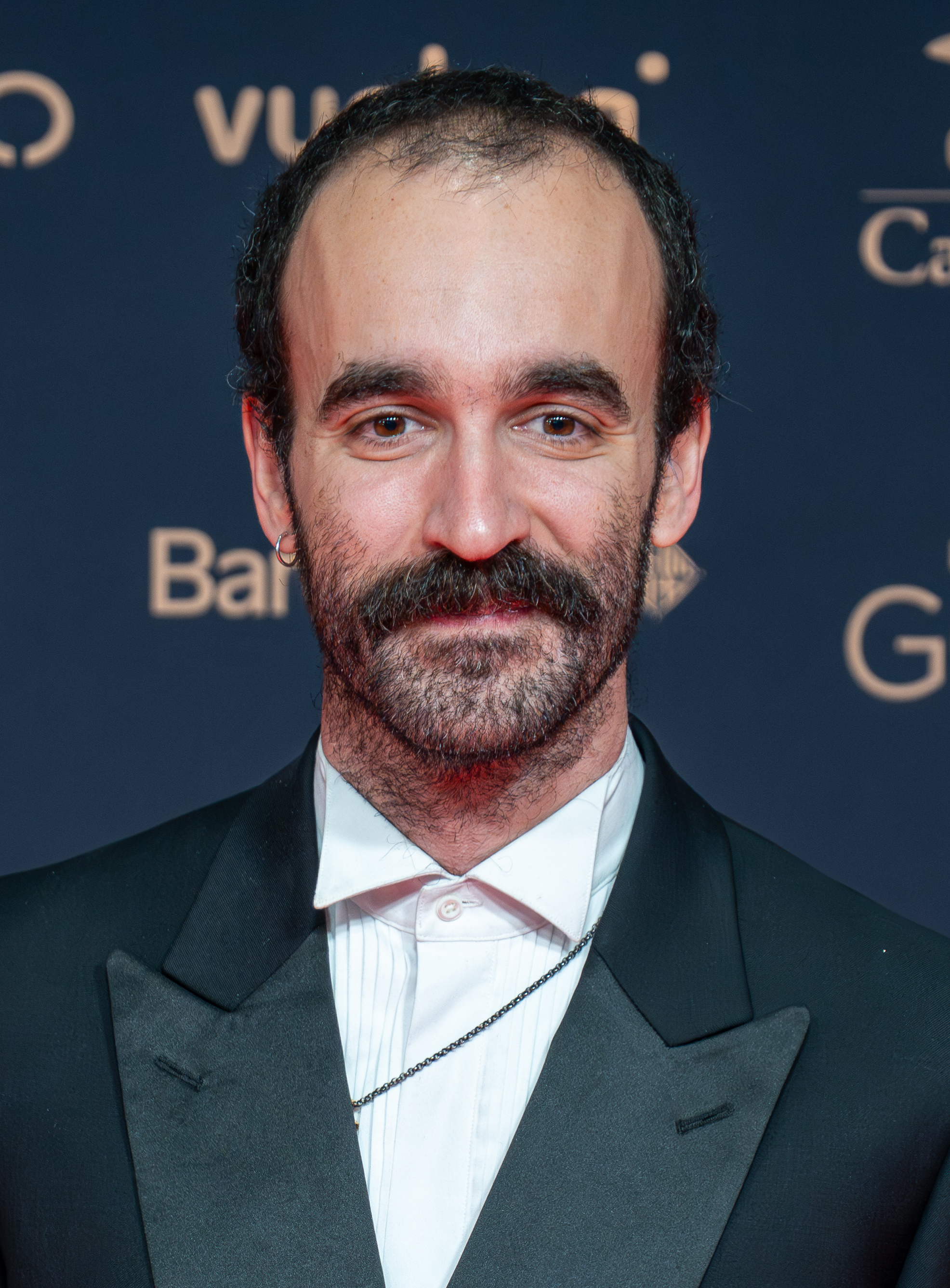
Sola in 2026

Eduard Sola (born 1989) is a Spanish screenwriter from Catalonia.

== Life and career ==
Sola was born in 1989. Raised in the Catalan municipality of Santa Eulàlia de Ronçana, Sola's baby steps as a screenwriter took place at the local television station Canal SET. He joined the ESCAC film school thanks to a scholarship. He has formed a team with Dani de la Orden since both were in the film school, as Sola found out that he preferred not to direct and De la Orden acknowledged that he preferred to direct scripts written by others. Despite this, he has directed a feature film, Lunático (2014). He is also a recurring collaborator of Nely Reguera.

2024 was a key year for Sola, with the release of many works written by him, both in film and television, such as Querer, The Red Virgin, Mamen Mayo, A House on Fire. He won the 2024 Critical Eye Award in Film. He won the Gaudí Award for Best Original Screenplay for A House on Fire, delivering a reception speech taking pride in his xarnego family background and praising culture (and culture in Catalan) as a vehicle for social mobility, claiming that "if my grandfather Eduardo was illiterate and I dedicate myself to writing, we are doing something right". He also collaborated with Cesc Gay in the screenplay of My Friend Eva.
