= Walkabout (disambiguation) =

A walkabout is an Australian aboriginal ritual of manhood.

Walkabout may also refer to:

== Arts, entertainment, and media ==
=== Music ===
==== Albums ====
- Walkabout (Najwa Nimri album), 2006
- Walkabout (The Fixx album), 1986

==== Songs ====
- "Walkabout" (Atlas Sound song), a song on the 2009 album Logos by Atlas Sound
- "Walkabout", a song on the 1992 album Stick Around for Joy by The Sugarcubes
- "Walkabout", a song on the 1995 album One Hot Minute by the Red Hot Chili Peppers
- "Walkabout", a song on the 1989 album The Works by Nik Kershaw
- "Walkabout", a song on the 2014 album Augustines by Augustines
- "Walkabout", a song on the 2023 album In and of Itself by Moka Only
- "Walkabout", a song on the album Pinnacles by Edgar Froese

=== Television ===
- "Walkabout" (Babylon 5), a 1996 episode of the Babylon 5 television series
- "Walkabout" (Lost), a 2004 episode of the Lost TV series
- "Walkabout" (Millennium), an episode of the Millennium television series
- "Walkabout" (Robin Hood), an episode from the second series of 2006 television series Robin Hood
- "Walkabout", an episode of Gargoyles animated television series

=== Other arts, entertainment, and media ===
- Walkabout (film), a 1971 film by Nicolas Roeg and stage production based on the novel
- Walkabout (magazine), an Australian travel magazine which ran from 1934 to 1974
- Walkabout (novel), a 1959 book written by James Vance Marshall, set in the Australian outback
- Walkabout (dance)

== Other uses ==
- Walkabout (pub chain), an Australian-themed pub chain
- Walkabout, a person's desire to travel without a planned itinerary or set destination; see wanderlust
- Billy Walkabout (1949–2007), thought to be the most decorated Native American soldier of the Vietnam War
- Walkabout Creek
- Walkabout Resources, Australian mining company
- Data General Walkabout, a family of notebook computers
