= Aurora Rodríguez Carballeira =

Spanish sociologist and murderer (1879–1955)

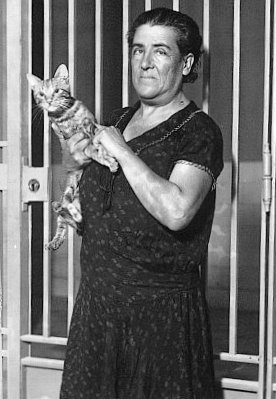
- Rodríguez Carballeira in 1933
- Born: April 23, 1879; Ferrol, A Coruña, Spain
- Died: December 28, 1955 (aged 76); Ciempozuelos, Madrid, Spain
- Known for: Murdering her teenage daughter Hildegart whom she conceived as a eugenics experiment

Aurora Rodríguez Carballeira (April 23, 1879 – December 28, 1955) was a Spanish anti-theist, socialist, eugenicist, and feminist. She conceived her daughter Hildegart Rodríguez Carballeira as part of a eugenicist scientific experiment and murdered her when she was 18 years old. Aurora was sentenced to 26 years in prison, and died of cancer while imprisoned at the Ciempozuelos mental asylum.

== Biography ==
Aurora Rodríguez Carballeira was born in 1879, at her family home on Magdalena street, in Ferrol, A Coruña, Spain, to Francisco Rodríguez Arriola (b. 1833) and Anna Carballeira Lopes. Her family and the environment she grew up in have been described as upper-class.

After Carballeira's sister Josefa gave birth to a son, Pepito Arriola, she left him in the care of Carballeira (who was then sixteen years old). Carballeira educated him until he became a child prodigy. Josefa then took him to Madrid, where he had enormous success as a musician.

Pepito's success strengthened Carballeira's reformist and eugenicist ideals and led her, in addition to her concerns for women's rights, to decide to raise a perfect woman to prove the virtues of eugenics. She wanted a father who could never claim paternity of the future baby, so she conceived the child with a military priest in Lleida named Alberto Pallás. Carballeira had three sexual encounters with Pallás as a "physiological collaborator". After discovering that she was pregnant, Carballeira moved to Madrid to give her daughter the life she had planned for her.

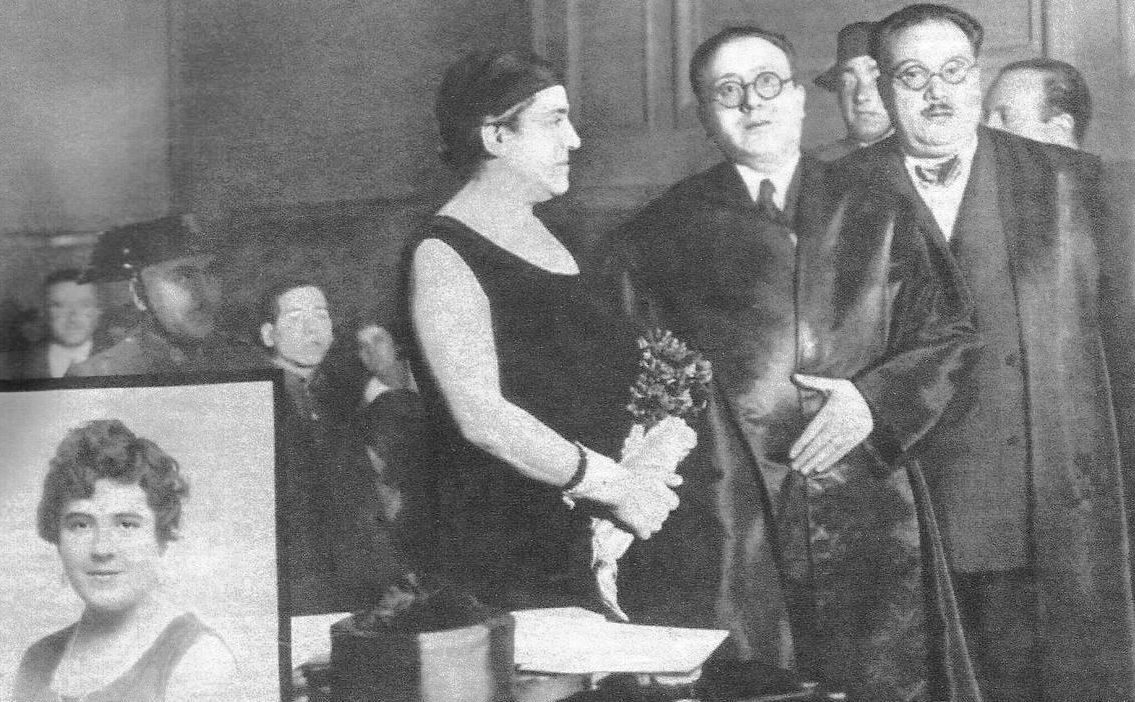
The 1934 trial of Aurora Rodríguez Carballeira for the death of her daughter Hildegart

The experiment initially met Carballeira's expectations, and Hildegart became an international celebrity. However, the freedom in which Hildegart was brought up led her to choose differing political commitments and she attempted to gain independence from her mother. Aurora was unwilling to forego control over her daughter's life, and was also affected by paranoid delusions that there was an international conspiracy to ruin the "perfect" result of her eugenicist experiment. As a result, she killed Hildegart on June 9, 1933, shooting her four times while the teenager was asleep. Carballeira's own explanation for the murder was, "The sculptor, after discovering the most minimal imperfection in his work, destroys it." (Note: Spanish: El escultor, tras descubrir la más mínima imperfección en su obra, la destruye.)

Carballeira never regretted murdering Hildegart and repeatedly said that she would do it again. Carballeira was sentenced to 26 years in prison, serving most of it in the Ciempozuelos mental asylum.

Until her medical records were found in 1977, Carballeira was believed to have become one of the "disappeared" during the Spanish Civil War, but she actually died of cancer in the Ciempozuelos psychiatric facility on December 28, 1955. She was buried in a mass grave.

== Works inspired by her life ==
=== Literary ===
- Guzmán, Eduardo de (1972). Aurora de sangre: vida y muerte de Hildegart (in Spanish). Madrid: Gregorio del Toro.
- Azcona, Rafael (1977). Aurora de sangre o La virgen roja: guión cinematográfico (in Spanish). Los autores. (Screenplay for the film by Fernán Gómez based on the novel by Eduardo de Guzmán.)
- Llarch Roig, Joan, Hildegart, la virgen roja, Barcelona, Producciones editoriales, 1979.
- Hackl, Erich, Auroras Anlaß, Diogenes Verlag, Zúrich 1987 ISBN 3257017340
- Arrabal, Fernando (1987). La virgen roja (in Spanish). Seix Barral. ISBN 978-84-322-0564-4.
- Rendueles, Guillermo (1989). El manuscrito encontrado en Ciempozuelos: análisis de la historia clínica de Aurora Rodríguez (in Spanish). Ediciones de la Piqueta. ISBN 978-84-7731-023-5. (Study of Aurora's clinical history at the Ciempozuelos hospital.)
- Cal Martínez, María Rosa, A mí no me doblega nadie: Aurora Rodríguez, su vida y su obra (Hildegart), Ediciós do Castro, Sada (La Coruña), 1991. ISBN 84-7492-542-8
- Domingo, Carmen, Mi querida hija Hildegart, ed. Destino, 2008. ISBN 8423340287
- Martini, Antonietta, Infierno: Ribellarsi al Destino. Traduzione e studio de La virgen roja di Fernando Arrabal, Edizioni Accademiche Italiane, Saarbrücken, 2014. ISBN 9783639656923
- Grandes, Almudena (2020). La madre de Frankenstein: agonía y muerte de Aurora Rodríguez Carballeira en el apogeo de la España nacionalcatólica, Manicomio de mujeres de Ciempozuelos, Madrid, 1954-1956 (in Spanish). Tusquets. ISBN 978-987-670-609-4. (It is the fifth novel in the Episodes of an Endless War series.)

=== Film ===
- My Daughter Hildegart (1977), directed by Fernando Fernán Gómez, with a script by the director himself and by Rafael Azcona. Aurora is played by Amparo Soler Leal.
- The red virgin (2014), directed by Sheila Pye. Aurora is played by Maribel Verdú.
- Hildegart oder Projekt: Superwoman (2016), directed by Barbara Caspar.
- The Red Virgin (2024), directed by Paula Ortiz, with Najwa Nimri as Aurora and Alba Planas as Hildegart.

== Bibliography ==
- Alvarellos, Enrique (1993). Mulleres destacadas de Galicia. Alvarellos Editora. ISBN 84-85311-96-5.
- Cal Martínez, María Rosa (1991). A mí no me doblega nadie: Aurora Rodríguez, su vida y su obra (Hildegart). Sada (La Coruña): Ediciós do Castro, 2010, ISBN 978-84-8485-301-5.
- De Guzmán Espinosa, Eduardo. Aurora de sangre, Madrid: Gregorio del Toro, 1972.
- Marco, Aurora (2007). Dicionario de Mulleres Galegas. Edicións A Nosa Terra. ISBN 978-84-8341-146-9.
- Montero, Rosa (1998). Historias de mujeres (in Spanish) (18 ed.). Madrid: Extra Alfaguara. pp. 181-93. ISBN 84-204-8301-X.
- Rendueles Olmedo, Guillermo. El manuscrito encontrado en Ciempozuelos: análisis de la historia clínica de Aurora Rodríguez Madrid: Endymion, 1989, ISBN 978-84-7731-023-5.
