= Mastretta (musician) =

Spanish musician (born 1964)

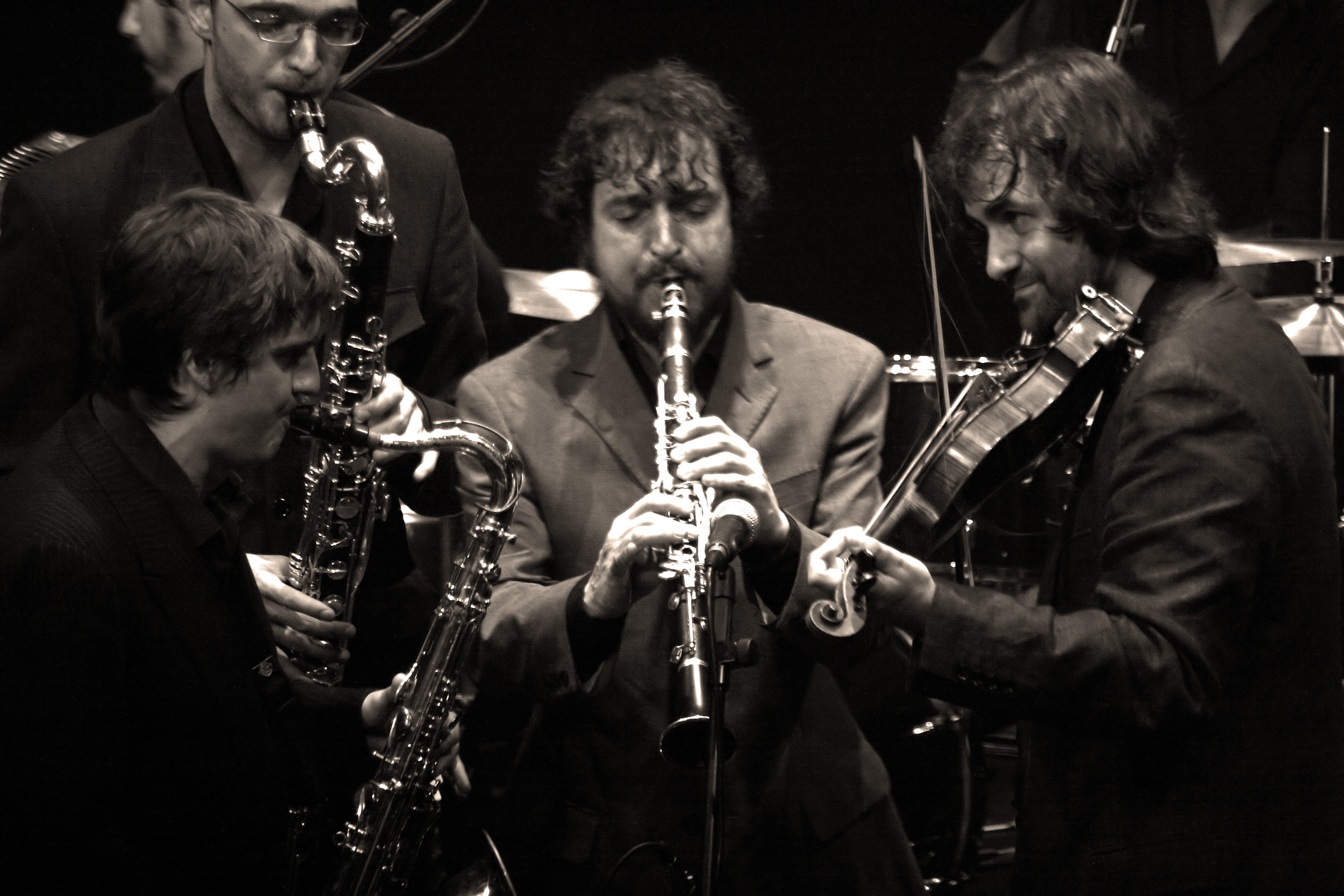
Mastretta (centre) and band in 2007

Mastretta is the artistic alias of Ignacio Mastretta Rodríguez (Barcelona; May 9, 1964), a Spanish musician, composer and record producer.

== Biography ==
=== Early years ===
Even though he was born in Barcelona, Nacho (short for Ignacio) Mastretta is considered a Cantabric musician, since he moved as a young child to Santander where he studied piano at Conservatorio Jesús de Monasterio of Santander.

His first music project was named Las Manos de Orlac, a band formed in 1987 that played pop and Caribbean music, where he sang and played a lot of instruments. With this band he recorded two albums, La Furia (1988) and Salud y Pesetas (1989). He then moved to Madrid in 1991 and from 1992 until 1999 he worked as a sound technician in the famous studio El Sol. He also worked at Sala Maravillas, working with international and local bands throughout the expansion of alternative rock.

=== Instrumental music on an indie label ===
By the same time, he started developing a personal instrumental style that didn't quite convince the multinational record companies, until Subterfuge Records, an independent label from Madrid, used his style to open a new music section in the label. Under the name Música para un Guateque Sideral in the summer of 1998, the instrumental single "Highballito" was released (Highballito is the name of a Mexican cocktail that appears in a Hemingway novel).

He had critical success, and it was in December 1998 when he released his first album, Melodías de Rayos-X. Instrumental sounds took a new step with the vocals of Ana Belén. Although Melodías de Rayos-X was not an electronic music album, it was still chosen by the editors of El País as The best electronic album of the '90s.

In 1998 he became the official composer of Spanish designer Jesús del Pozo's fashion shows, and in 1999 he published the EP Música para el Desfile de la Colección de Otoño-Invierno 1999–2000 de Jesús del Pozo. By that time he had already collaborated with his music for Volkswagen Polo and Bitter Kas ads.

In January 2000 his second album Luna de Miel was issued, an interesting work where 10 female voices give some warmth to the compositions. Curiously, the lyrics were written by Mastretta –with help from his brother, Fernando- and voiced by women from different nationalities: Julieta Venegas and Alaska from Mexico, Rubi from Argentina, Beatrice from Italy, Gemma Corredera from Cuba, Rasha from Sudan and, from Spain Raquel Pascual, Irantzu Valencia from the band La Buena Vida, Cristina Lliso, Ana Belén and Ajo from the band Mil Dolores Pequeños. The link between the songs in Luna de Miel is the irony and sadness among women in distress with everyday problems. Due to the concept of collaboration, only two live presentations were done in Madrid for two days in May 2000 at the Colegio Mayor San Juan Evangelista.

In February 2000 he published the soundtrack of Asphalt, the fourth film of Daniel Calparsoro, which was nominated that same year in the XV Premios Goya and the Goya Award for Best Original Music. In May he released the soundtrack of the short film En Malas Compañías by Malagan Antonio Hens.

On the occasion of the XI Semana de Cine Fantástico y de Terror de San Sebastián, in 2000, he published Bascombe, a CD single inspired in Sci Fi films, with versions of the music from Star Wars and Mars Attacks!.

In 2001, besides playing throughout the American continent beside Julieta Venegas, he composed the soundtracks for the feature film El Sueño del Caimán by Beto Gómez and the short film Desaliñada by Gustavo Salmerón, and in November, Música de Automóvil, an instrumental album that reflects his characteristic sound, but always with an unprecedented point of strangeness added.

He has performed at international festivals such as Pop Komm in Germany, Arezzo Wave in Italy, Sónar in Barcelona and in Mexico and the United States.

=== As a record producer ===
As a producer he has worked with Liquits, Tonino Carotone, Peret and Josele Santiago. He has remixed Fangoria and Titán and he has collaborated with numerous bands and artists like Renato Carossone, Peret, Los Enemigos, Los Planetas, Mercromina and Pauline en la Playa.

== Discography ==
=== Studio albums ===
Year	Title	Label	Note
1998	Melodías de Rayos-X	Subterfuge Records	Chosen by El País as the Best Electronic Album of the '90s
2000	Luna de Miel	Subterfuge Records	11 tracks sung by 10 guest female vocalists
2000	Asfalto	Subterfuge Records	Original Soundtrack of Asfalto by Daniel Calparsoro
2001	El Sueño del Caimán	Subterfuge Records	Original Soundtrack of El Sueño del Caimán by Beto Gómez
2001	Música de Automóvil	Subterfuge Records	Instrumental recording (with one vocal track sung by Julieta Venegas)
2008	¡Vivan los Músicos!	Nuevos Medios	Recorded at the end of 2007
2014	El reino del Veriveri	Mastretta	Recorded live at Infinity Studios in Madrid in 2012

=== Singles and EPs ===
Year	Title	Label	Note
1998	Highballito	Subterfuge Records	Single
1999	Música para el Desfile de la Colección de Otoño-Invierno 1999–2000 de Jesús del Pozo	Subterfuge Records	EP for fashion designer Jesús del Pozo's show
2000	Bascombe	Subterfuge Records	Issued along with the "Semana de Cine Fantástico y de Terror" of San Sebastián
2000	Malas Compañías	Subterfuge Records	Original Soundtrack of the short film En Malas Compañías by Antonio Hens
2002	Reparto a Domicilio	Subterfuge Records	Original edit and 4 mixes
