= The Red Virgin =

- Theatrical release poster
- Spanish: La virgen roja
- Directed by: Paula Ortiz
- Screenplay by: Eduard Sola; Clara Roquet
- Produced by: María Zamora; Stefan Schmitz
- Starring: Najwa Nimri; Alba Planas; Aixa Villagrán; Patrick Criado; Pepe Viyuela
- Cinematography: Pedro J. Márquez
- Edited by: Pablo Gómez-Pan
- Music by: Juanma Latorre Guille Galván
- Production companies: Amazon MGM Studios; Elastica Films; Avalon PC
- Distributed by: Elastica (es)
- Release dates: 22 September 2024 (Zinemaldia); 27 September 2024 (Spain)
- Countries: United States; Spain
- Language: Spanish

The Red Virgin (Spanish: La virgen roja) is a 2024 biographical drama film directed by Paula Ortiz from a screenplay by Eduard Sola and Clara Roquet. It stars Najwa Nimri and Alba Planas as respectively Aurora and Hildegart Rodríguez. Set during the Second Spanish Republic and based on a real-life story, the plot follows the tortuous relationship between a child prodigy, pundit on female sexuality and lodestar of sexual revolution (Planas) and her obsessive mother (Nimri), who groomed her and keeps her under a tight grip. Patrick Criado, Aixa Villagrán, and Pepe Viyuela appear in supporting roles.

The film is a United States-Spain co-production by Amazon MGM Studios alongside Elastica Films and Avalon PC. It world premiered at the 72nd San Sebastián International Film Festival on 22 September 2024, ahead of its 27 September 2024 theatrical release in Spain by Elastica. It was nominated for nine Goya Awards (including Best Director).

== Plot ==
An affluent woman, Aurora Rodríguez, copulates with a clergyman. The result is the birth of Hildegart, who Aurora homeschools and grooms to become a girl prodigy able to change the world.

In 1931 Madrid, against the backdrop of the proclamation of the Second Spanish Republic, Aurora and 16-year-old Hildegart go to the editorial office of a newspaper to seek the publication of a piece on female sexuality by Hildegart, needing to convince the editor, Guzmán, that it was actually written by the teenager.

Hildegart is introduced to Socialist activist Abel Vilella who shows a keen interest in her. Hildegart and Aurora live in a well-off apartment together with maid Macarena while Hildegart continues her training. Due to her successful writing, Hildegart also corresponds with Havelock Ellis. Macarena provides Aurora with a gun due to the menace posed by misogynistic graffiti appearing on the wall of the staircase landing and reveals to Hildegart that Aurora had only loved a man (as a son) in her whole life, her nephew Pepe, of whom Hildegart knows nothing. Hildegart and Abel meet again during a meeting of socialists in which Hildegart delivers an impassioned speech supporting women rights and participation in politics as well as during a signing session of her book, after which Hildegart falls for Abel. As Hildegart secretly confesses her infatuation with Abel to Macarena, Aurora overhears from behind the door and plots to separate the two young love birds, determined not to let Hildegart stray away from her purpose.

Aurora receives a letter of invitation to a piano concert by her nephew and music prodigy Pepe Arriola, who was also groomed by Aurora and was separated from her before she decided to embark on Project Hildegart. She meets him after the concert backstage and finds out that she was not actually invited by him, and the whole thing was a ruse so Hildegart could have a date with Abel free from the maternal surveillance. Aurora invites Abel to dinner, and Abel and Hildegart tell her about their disenchantment with the Socialist party ranks and their interest in the positions of the Federal Party, which Aurora deems to boast an anarchist stance. Police agents break into the room and arrest Abel on charges of being a serial rapist and feminicide. To Hildegart's despair, Macarena is replaced by another maid. It is eventually revealed to Hildegart that Aurora had blackmailed Macarena into framing Abel for the crimes that were actually committed by Macarena's husband.

Hildegart visits Macarena's humble residence and threatens to frame her as an accomplice to the crimes unless she clears Abel's name of her own volition. With help from Guzmán, Hildegart manages to get a travel ticket to London and convinces Abel to go with her. During a family dinner, Hildegart tells her mother that she is a woman free from anyone, says good night and leaves the room. Aurora acknowledges that Project Hildegart has failed, gets the gun, goes to Hildegart's bedroom and shoots her daughter through the crotch, through the chest, and finally, through the forehead. Hildegart's dead body is paraded in a glass casket through the streets of Madrid under the twilight.

== Cast ==
- Najwa Nimri as Aurora
- Alba Planas as Hildegart
- Aixa Villagrán as Macarena
- Patrick Criado as Abel Vilella
- Pepe Viyuela as Eduardo de Guzmán

== Production ==
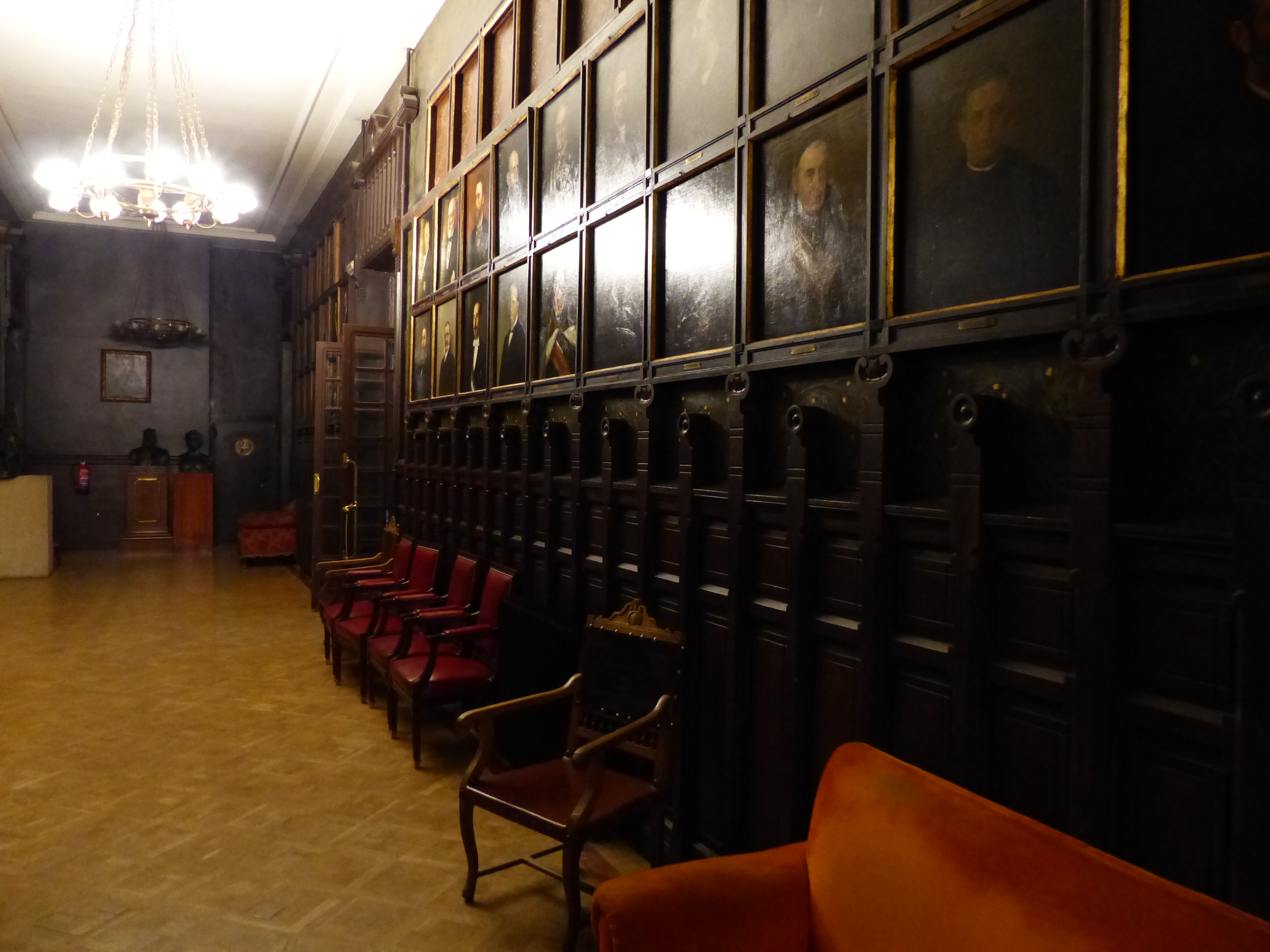
Ateneo de Madrid was the location for the Socialist meetings.

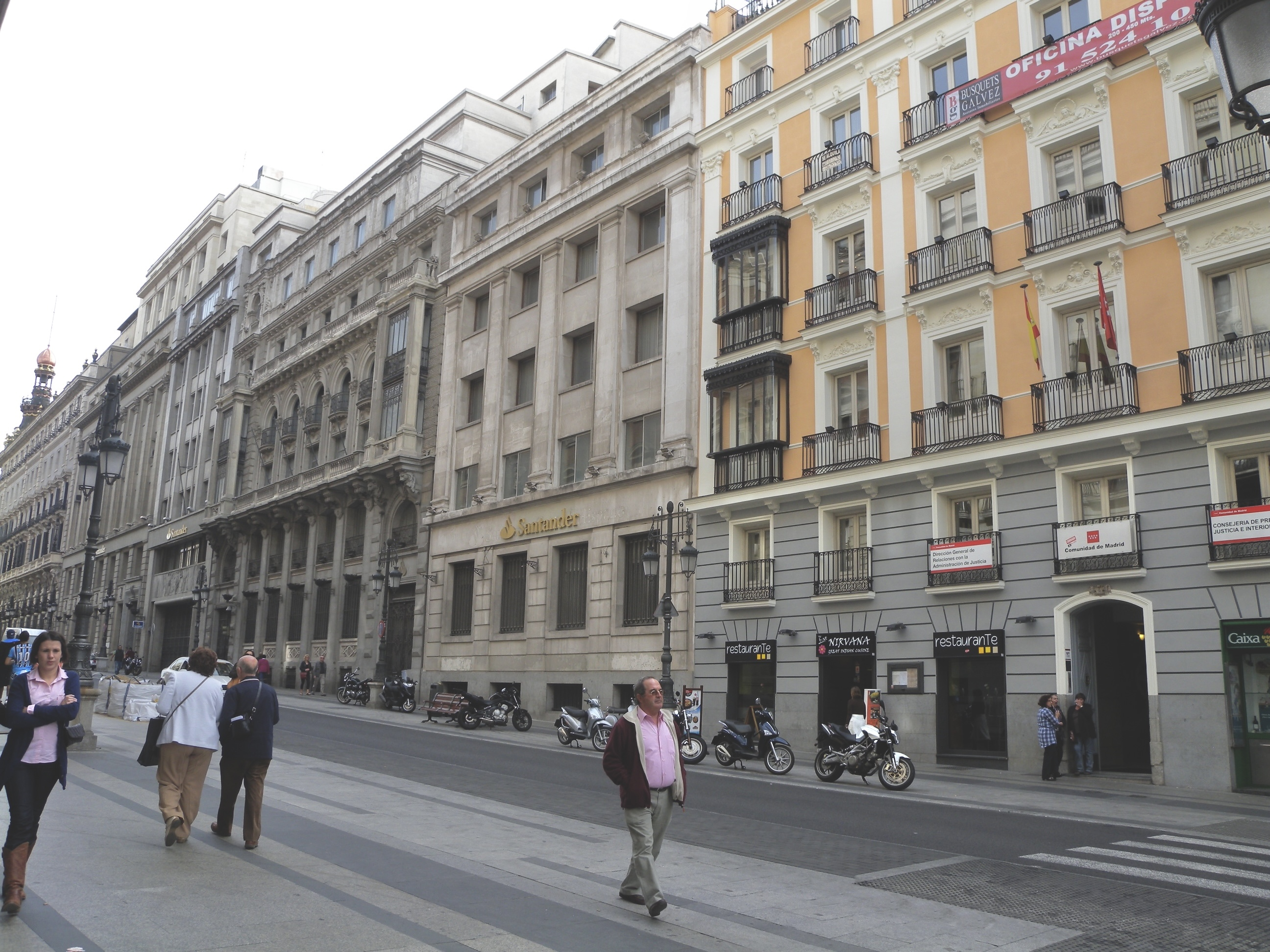
The start of calle Alcalá from Puerta del Sol is the location of the funeral parade. Photo from 2010.

The screenplay was written by Eduard Sola and Clara Roquet. (Note: The tortuous relationship between Aurora and Hildegart was previously dealt with in several works of fiction, including the feature film My Daughter Hildegart (1977) directed by Fernando Fernán Gómez (starring Amparo Soler Leal and Carmen Roldán) and the short film The Red Virgin (2011) directed by Sheyla Pye (starring Maribel Verdú and Ivana Baquero).) An Amazon MGM Studios, Elastica, and Avalon production, the project, then titled Hildegart, was disclosed by Amazon Prime Video at the 'Prime Video Presents España' event in April 2023. The platform pitched the film as a mix of "historical drama, romance, thriller and a touch of true crime". Main cast additions including Najwa Nimri, Alba Planas, Patrick Criado, Aixa Villagrán and Pepe Viyuela were announced on 14 June 2023. Shooting had already begun by July 2023. Production wrapped on 19 August 2023. Shooting locations in Madrid included the Congress, Puerta del Sol, and Ateneo de Madrid.

The score was composed by Vetusta Morla members Juanma Latorre and Guille Galván, also including the song "La virgen roja" by Maria Arnal.

== Release ==
Selected for a special screening in the official selection of the 72nd San Sebastián International Film Festival, The Red Virgin was presented on 22 September 2024. The film was released theatrically in Spain on 27 September 2024 by Elastica.

== Reception ==
On the review aggregator website Rotten Tomatoes, 100% of 10 critics' reviews are positive, with an average rating of 8.0/10.

Juan Pando of Fotogramas rated the film 5 out of 5 stars, highlighting Najwa Nimri as "she alone fills the whole film" as the best thing about it.

Raquel Hernández Luján of HobbyConsolas gave the film 75 points ('good'), mentioning the visual allegories, the care with the mise-en-scène and the quality of the performances as the film's best.

Rubén Romero Santos of Cinemanía rated the film 3½ out of 5 stars, writing that the film "dialogues with the present through the director's usual aestheticizing gaze", carrying in the ending "one of the best and most ambitious scenes of the year".

Javier Ocaña of El País wrote that the film "is artistically impeccable in all areas" and brings in "the sum of great production and an elegant mise-en-scène".

== Accolades ==
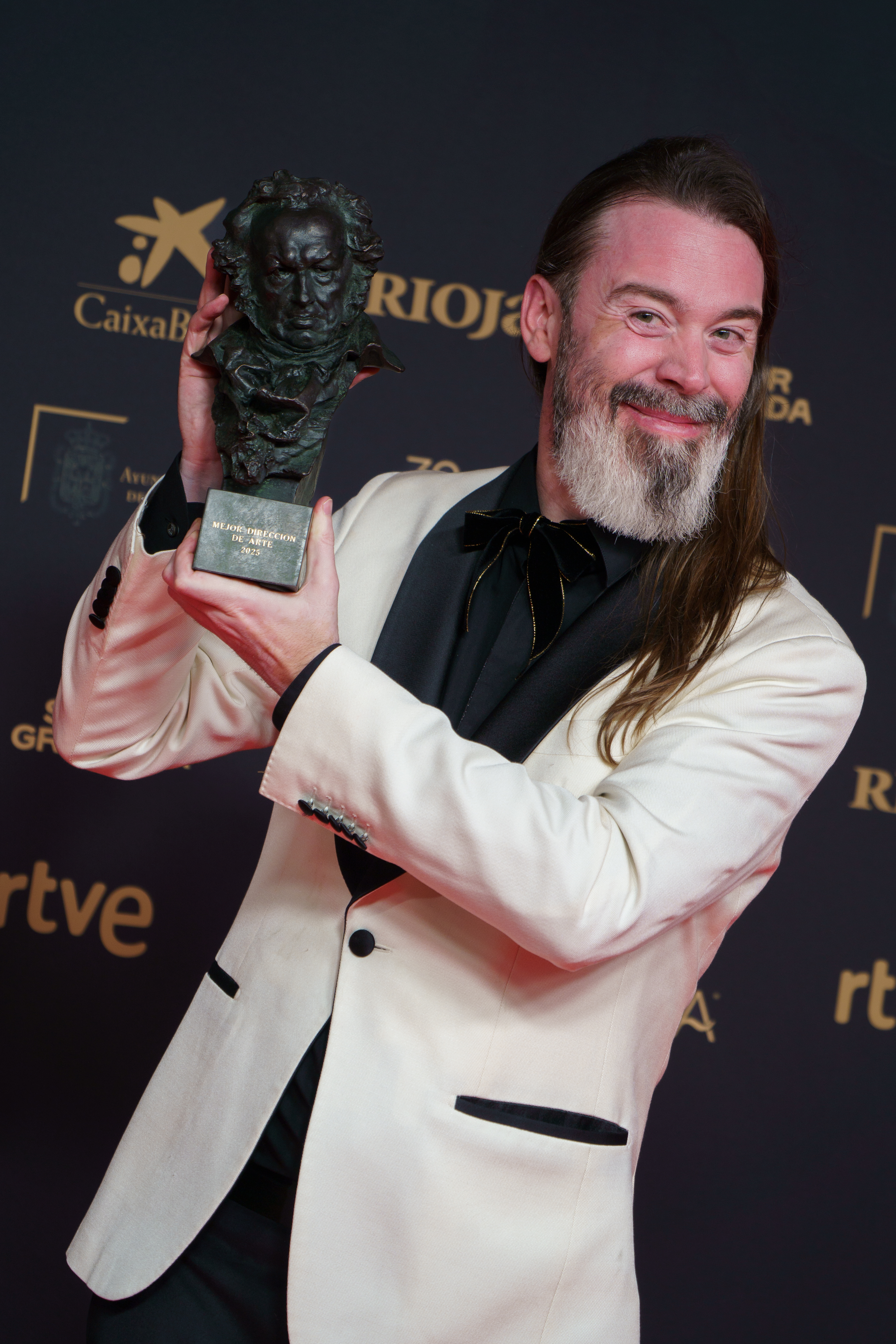
Javier Alvariño holding his Goya Award for Best Art Direction at the 39th Goya Awards

Year	Award	Category	Nominee(s)	Result	Ref.
2024	30th Forqué Awards	Best Actress in a Film	Najwa Nimri	Nominated	
2025	12th Feroz Awards	Best Director	Paula Ortiz	Nominated	
2025	12th Feroz Awards	Best Main Actress in a Film	Najwa Nimri	Nominated	
2025	12th Feroz Awards	Best Supporting Actress in a Film	Aixa Villagrán	Nominated	
2025	12th Feroz Awards	Best Screenplay in a Film	Eduard Sola, Clara Roquet	Nominated	
2025	12th Feroz Awards	Best Trailer	Marta Longás, Jesús Fernández García	Nominated	
2025	80th CEC Medals	Best Film		Nominated	
2025	80th CEC Medals	Best Director	Paula Ortiz	Nominated	
2025	80th CEC Medals	Best Original Screenplay	Clara Roquet, Eduard Sola	Nominated	
2025	80th CEC Medals	Best Actress	Najwa Nimri	Nominated	
2025	80th CEC Medals	Best Supporting Actress	Aixa Villagrán	Won	
2025	80th CEC Medals	Best Cinematography	Pedro J. Márquez	Won	
2025	80th CEC Medals	Best Editing	Pablo Gómez Pan	Nominated	
2025	80th CEC Medals	Best Music	Guille Galván, Juanma Latorre	Nominated	
2025	39th Goya Awards	Best Director	Paula Ortiz	Nominated	
2025	39th Goya Awards	Best Supporting Actress	Aixa Villagrán	Nominated	
2025	39th Goya Awards	Best Original Song	"La virgen roja" by Maria Arnal	Nominated	
2025	39th Goya Awards	Best Art Direction	Javier Alvariño	Won	
2025	39th Goya Awards	Best Costume Design	Arantxa Ezquerro	Won	
2025	39th Goya Awards	Best Makeup and Hairstyles	Eli Adánez, Paco Rodríguez Frías	Nominated	
2025	39th Goya Awards	Best Sound	Coque F. Lahera, Álex F Capilla & Nacho Royo-Villanova	Nominated	
2025	39th Goya Awards	Best Special Effects	Raúl Romanillos, Juanma Nogales	Nominated	
2025	39th Goya Awards	Best Production Supervision	Kati Martí Donoghue	Nominated	
2025	33rd Actors and Actresses Union Awards	Best Film Actress in a Leading Role	Najwa Nimri	Nominated	
2025	33rd Actors and Actresses Union Awards	Best Film Actress in a Secondary Role	Aixa Villagrán	Nominated	
2025	33rd Actors and Actresses Union Awards	Best Film Actor in a Secondary Role	Patrick Criado	Won	
2025	33rd Actors and Actresses Union Awards	Best New Actress	Alba Planas	Nominated	
2025	12th Platino Awards	Best Art Direction	Javier Alvariño	Nominated	

== See also ==
- List of Spanish films of 2024
