= Sex education in Francoist Spain and the democratic transition =

Sex education in Francoist Spain (1939–1975) and the democratic transition (1975–1982) was prohibited by law to be taught in schools. When it was addressed, it was originally done so from a moralistic point of view, highlighting concepts like the need for chastity. During the mid-1950s, this practice began to change, and after formal government approval sex education incorporated more elements of psychology and biology. Despite a lack of government-sanctioned sex education, people were taught informally. Middle-class women could learn from marriage guides. More generally, as women approached the age to marry, they received more sexual education from friends, mothers, sisters, and future in-laws. Upper-class men learned by having sex with prostitutes and maids employed by their households.

During the 1970s, the topic was still considered taboo in schools. One government report encouraged the teaching of sex education, primarily because they believed it would serve to decrease the growing population of lesbians in Spain. No action was taken as Franco died in 1975, and the democratic transition began. Despite being a topic among Spanish feminists, the need for sex education was barely addressed. Meaningful reforms did not happen, and when they began in the post-transition period, they were limited in scope.

== History ==
=== Francoist period (1939–1975) ===
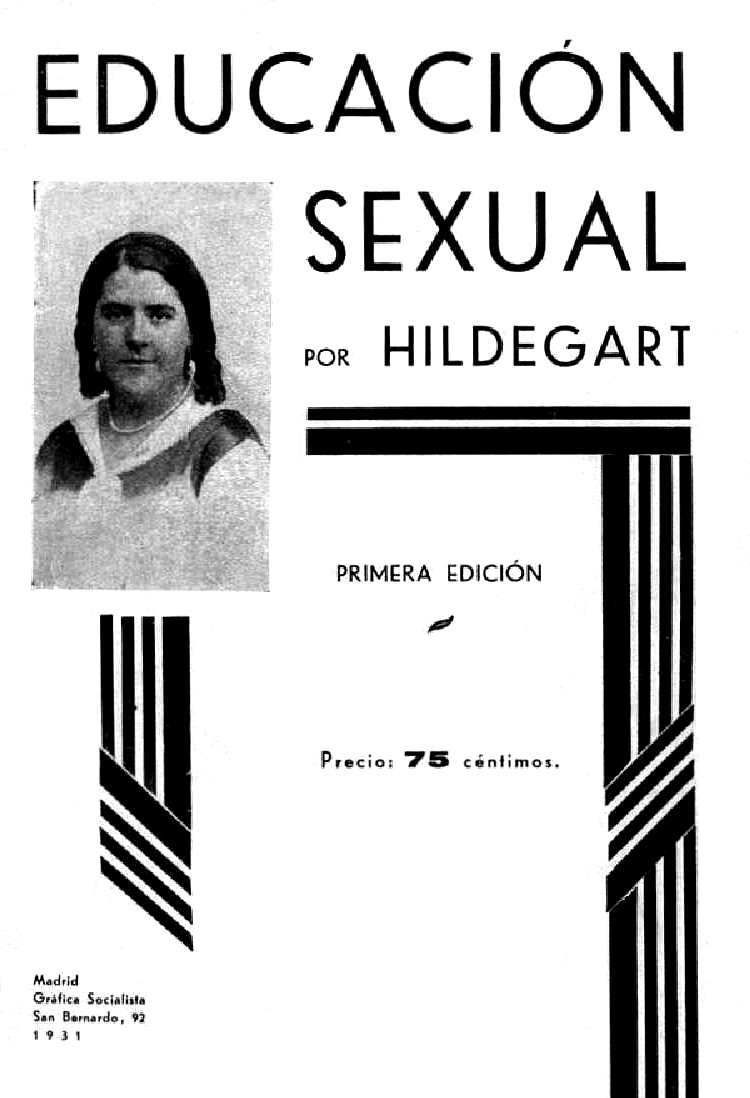
Educación Sexual by Hildegart Rodríguez Carballeira. This Spanish sex education guide was published in 1931 in Madrid, eight years before Francoism.

Sexual reform began to take place in the 1920s and 1930s. During the Second Republic, it included the ability of schools to provide formal sex education. With the forcible introduction of Francoism, women's sexuality was relegated in society exclusively to the realm of medicine, and only allowed to be discussed in medical literature by male doctors. Women were taught in Francoist Spain to be "submissive, devoted and devout". Women's sexuality was not a consideration in the Franco period. The subject of female masturbation was taboo. It was in this atmosphere that on 24 January 1941 as part of a number of laws around women's sexuality that sex education was banned, with punishments attached for teaching it. What knowledge was imparted taught boys that masturbation had serious health implications. For girls, masturbation was never discussed.

Despite legal prohibitions against teaching sex education, it was not that sex education was not completely taught in the early Franco period; it was just taught using other modes, such as an instruction books with names such as Castidad y Juventud (Chastity and Youth), published in 1948. It borrowed from German models, and was centered around morality of the individual. Teachers were purged from the classroom in Spain on a regular basis for a variety of reasons. In Valencia, these included providing sex education and information about contraceptives.

Informally, girls were faced with a knowledge void. Their elders did not share information with them. This silence led to the spreading of myths around women's sexuality, including that men were a representation of evil. As they grew older and closer to the age to marry, girls received more sexual education from friends, mothers, sisters, and future in-laws. The education explained the role of the husband. It also addressed the importance of a doctor for reproductive health. Largely though, young women were left to navigate in the dark, with little informal education. Few girls from economically disadvantaged families had access to texts that could provide them with additional information, not even in manuals designed for marriage preparation courses. For other parts of society, the use of marriage self-help books was common, and many people received their sex education from these. These marital guides about sex and conjugal rights were published for couples about to marry or recently married, providing information for men or women on sexual and reproductive health. They were written from a clinical perspective and amounted to self-help guides. They were intended to be read in the privacy of a person's home, correcting misinformation resulting from people not being able to discuss sexuality because it was culturally taboo. For upper-class men, sex education was generally informal and would often come from sex with prostitutes and with maids employed by their households.

"At school, I never understood why they highlighted spiritual exercises around a sexual theme. And on the sexual issue, of course, they never talked about consummating sexual relationships; that only existed in the minds of evil beings. But they did give us class and all kinds of information, especially kisses. I especially admired the screw kiss. They told us how the kids play, how you can never allow a boy to give you his hand, because the hand passes to the arm, and the arm is already lost. The dances, the look of a boy ... It was all sin. I remember that when we prepared the confession, which was weekly, they always made us talk, and it was very difficult for me to talk about the so-called impure desires."

— A woman in Zaragoza of her formal sex education in the 1960s, Actitudes de las mujeres bajo el primer Franquismo: La práctica del aborto en Zaragoza durante los años 40,

Sexual education began to change in the mid-1950s as there was cultural upheaval in Spain as a result of various factors, including an end to the international boycott of the country, improved economic conditions and the presence of American troops in the country. It was at this point that sex education, when discussed in school, began to take on a new tone centered around biology and psychology that nonetheless still supported regime ideology around the sex roles of the populace. Instituto Rosa Sensat started operating in 1965 in Catalonia. It was revolutionary for its time, in that it encouraged mixed-gendered classrooms, emphasized the importance of psychologists being involved in students school life, taught children in Catalan, and supported sex education. Modern Sexual Techniques published in 1959 by Robert Street would serve as a sex education guide for a number of men in 1960s Spain.

The 1970 General Law of Education makes no mention of sex education as the topic was generally considered taboo. Though sexuality was something students faced daily on the streets and in the media, it was not a topic educators felt prepared to address.

Ahead of the Year of the Woman, the Government created eight commissions to investigate the status of Spanish women, using two reports from the commissions published in 1975: La situación de la mujer en España and Memoria del Año Internacional de la Mujer. Among the findings were that the number of lesbians was increasing owing to factors such as "physical or congenital defects", the "affective traumas and unsatisfied desires", families being unable to prevent women's conversation, "Contagion and mimicry" and "[...] the lack of relationship with men as a consequence of an excessively rigid education, the existence of institutions which by their very nature eliminated these relationships: prisons, hospitals, psychiatric and religious communities, etc. ..., the media, tourism, alcohol, drugs and the desire to seek new sensations, prostitution, and vice." To tackle the problem of the growing lesbian population, the Government commission proposed solutions like "early diagnoses and medical treatments and psychotherapeutics that [corrected] possible somatic defects", creating a sex education program and the promotion of the idea that both genders can peacefully co-exist. In their reports, single motherhood was identified as a problem, though they noted it was in decline which they attributed in part to the use of the pill and other contraceptives, and to women having abortions in other countries where the practice was legal.

=== Democratic transition period (1975–1986) ===
Franco died in November 1975. The end of the Franco era introduced a period where it was finally possible to talk about sex openly, and sex education was just one issue taken up by Spanish feminists in this period. Despite this, during the transition period, the need for sex education was barely addressed and not seen as part of a need to advance personal liberties.

Meaningful reforms to bring sex education into the classroom did not begin in earnest until 1990, well after the democratic transition period had ended. In many cases, not even the passage of time led to the introduction of sex education. It would be added and removed from curriculum on a local level. In 2004, in the absence of any formal education, 41% of Spaniards did not understand the importance of using condoms.
