= The Elderly (film) =

2022 Spanish horror film

- Film poster
- Spanish: Viejos
- Directed by: Raúl Cerezo; Fernando González Gómez
- Screenplay by: Raúl Cerezo; Javier Trigales; Rubén Sánchez Trigos
- Produced by: José Luis Rancaño
- Starring: Zorion Eguileor; Gustavo Salmerón; Paula Gallego; Irene Anula
- Cinematography: Ignacio Aguilar
- Edited by: José Manuel Jiménez
- Music by: Eneko Vadillo
- Production companies: A Person's Films; La Dalia Films; Antídoto Films
- Release date: 16 July 2022 (Fantasia)
- Country: Spain
- Language: Spanish

The Elderly (Spanish: Viejos) is a 2022 Spanish elderly-themed horror film directed by Raúl Cerezo and Fernando González Gómez which stars Zorion Eguileor, Gustavo Salmerón, Paula Gallego, and Irene Anula.

== Plot ==
Set in Madrid during a heat wave, the plot follows the strange behaviour displayed by elderly people, focusing on the deterioration of octogenarian Manuel in the wake of his wife Rosa's suicide and the actions of Manuel's family (son Mario, daughter-in-law Lena, and granddaughter Naia), otherwise at odds vis-à-vis the prospect of welcoming him.

== Cast ==
- Zorion Eguileor as Manuel
- Gustavo Salmerón as Mario
- Irene Anula as Lena
- Paula Gallego as Naia
- Ángela López Gamonal as Rosa

== Production ==
The screenplay was penned by Raúl Cerezo, Javier Trigales, and Rubén Sánchez Trigos. A Person's Films, La Dalia Films and Antídoto Films production, the film had the collaboration of Gobierno de Navarra and Navarra Film Commission and support from Ayuntamiento de Madrid. Shooting locations included Madrid and Navarre.

== Release ==
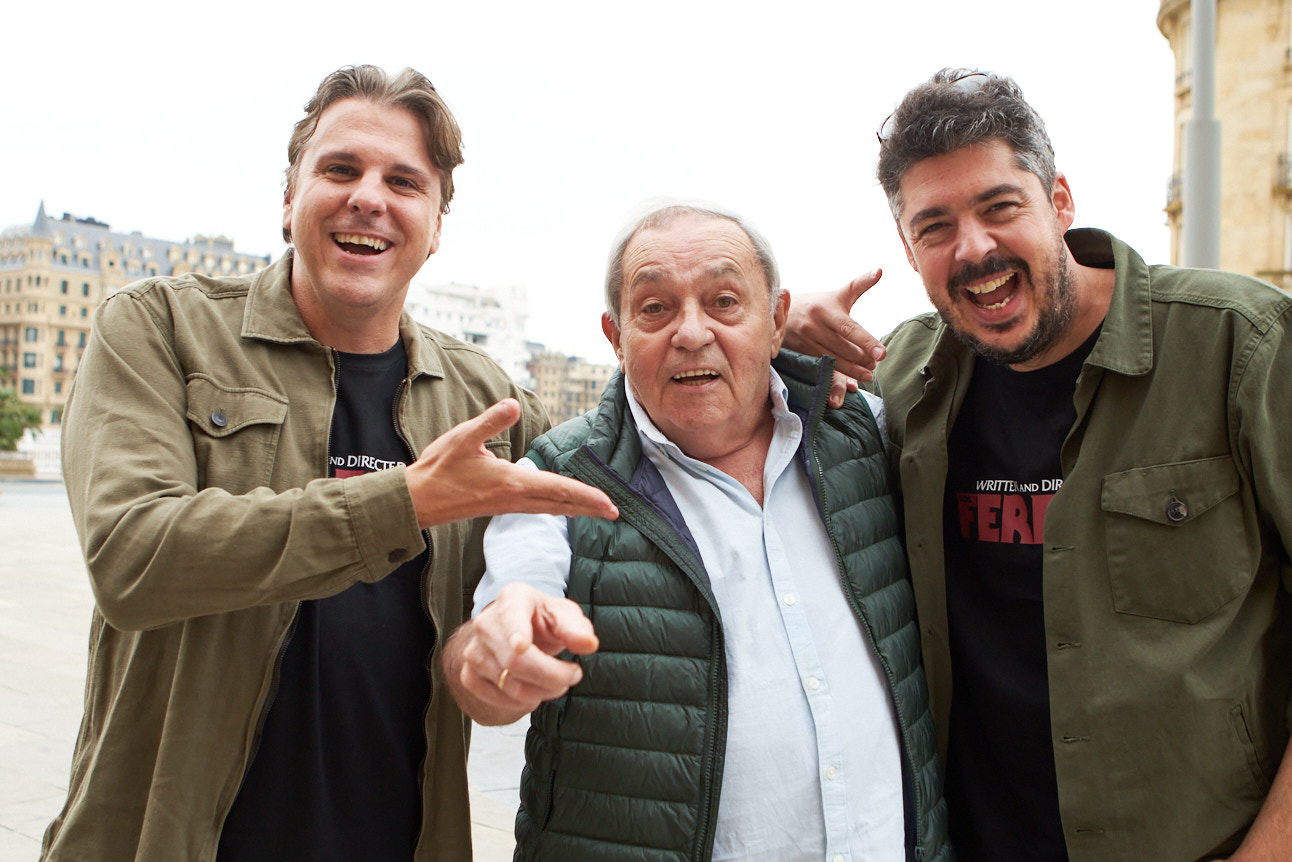
Raúl Cerezo, Zorion Eguileor and Fernando González Gómez attending the San Sebastián Fantasy and Horror Film Festival in October 2022

The film made its world premiere at the Montreal-based Fantasia International Film Festival on 16 July 2022. It was set to have its US premiere at the Austin-based Fantastic Fest in September 2022. It was set to land its European premiere at the 55th Sitges Film Festival in October 2022.

== Reception ==
Andrew Mack of ScreenAnarchy described the film as a "mysteriously wicked horror that starts off as a tale of supernatural residency and influence on our grandparents", with "all hell" breaking loose in a "breathtaking 15 minute finale".

Meagan Navarro of Bloody Disgusting assessed that "the intense finale cannot compensate for the sluggish and overly mysterious build-up", with the helmers favouring prolonged ambiguity throughout the bulk of the film over anything else.

Nick Allen of RogerEbert.com assessed the film to be "imbalanced", with its visual compositions being "so striking throughout", but "its plotting trades the ominous for obvious".

Sharai Bohannon of Dread Central rated the film 4½ out of 5 stars, deeming it to be a "disturbingly deadly chaotic ride", a "gorgeous movie, with just the right amount of creepiness, tension, and drama".

== See also ==
- List of Spanish films of 2022
