= Zorion Eguileor =

Spanish actor, singer-songwriter and broadcaster

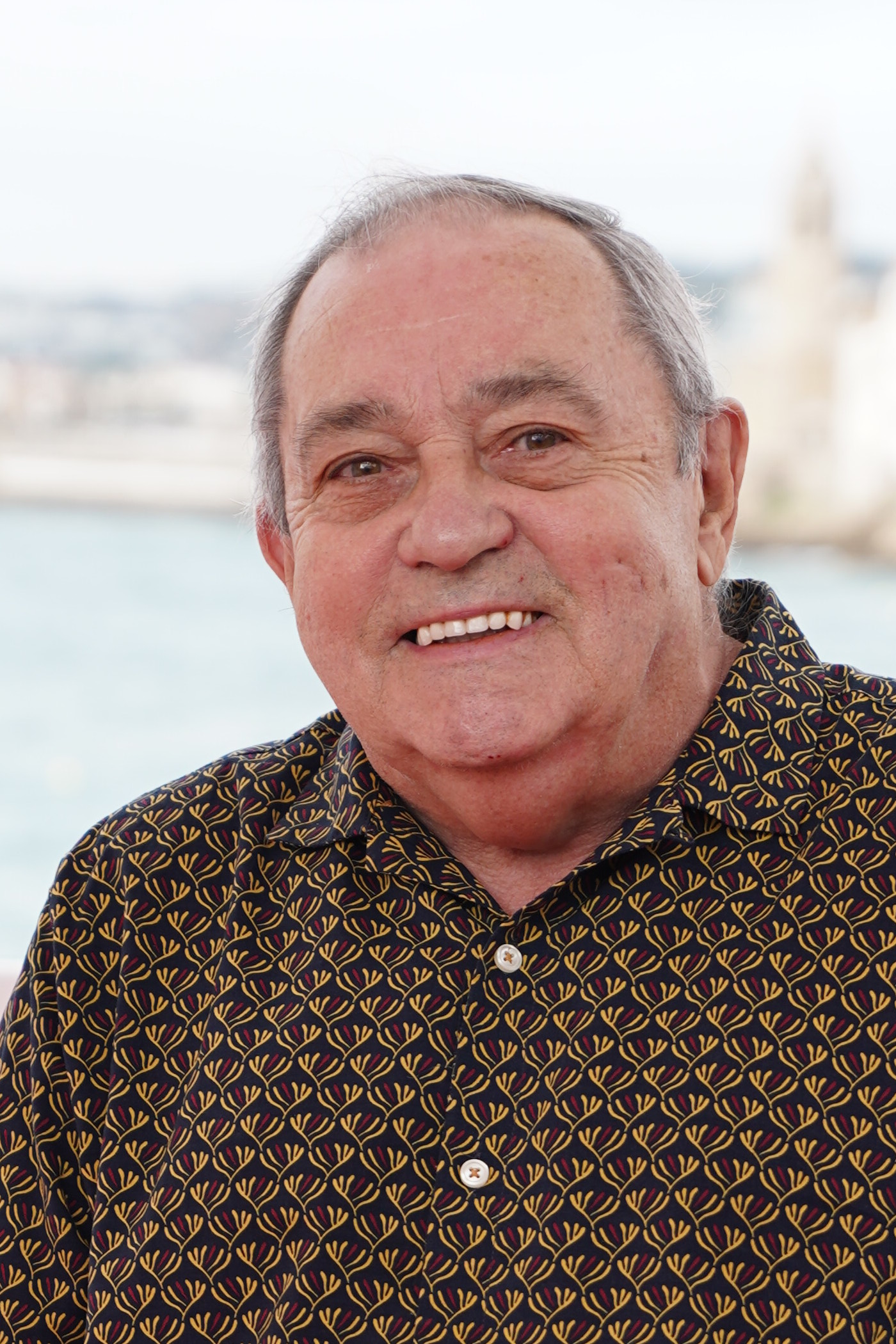
- Eguileor in 2019
- Born: 15 March 1946 (age 80); Mundaka, Basque Country, Spain
- Occupation: Actor

Zorion Eguileor (born 15 March 1946) is a Spanish actor, singer-songwriter and broadcaster. He is known for his role in The Platform.

== Career ==
Eguileor's career in cinema and television in Spain began in the 1990s, in which he recorded appearances in productions such as Salto al vacío and Qué grande es el teatro. In the 2000s, he appeared in films such as La voz de su amo, Visionarios and La felicidad perfecta, and in the RTVE series Cuéntame cómo pasó. In the 2010s, he appeared in Mi querido Klikowsky, La que se avecina, El tiempo entre costuras and Estoy vivo. Eguileor gained international recognition after appearing in El Hoyo in 2019, directed by Galder Gaztelu-Urrutia and released on Netflix in March 2020.

== Filmography ==
=== Movies ===
- 2025 - Maspalomas
- 2024 - El hoyo 2 (The Platform 2)
- 2022 - Viejos (The Elderly)
- 2022 - Objetos (Lost & Found)
- 2020 - Ilargi guztiak
- 2019 - El hoyo (The Platform)
- 2015 - Pikadero
- 2015 - La matanza
- 2015 - Domingo, el amanecedor (cortometraje)
- 2014 - Anómalo (cortometraje)
- 2013 - La buena hija
- 2012 - Hamaiketakoa (cortometraje)
- 2010 - Estrellas que alcanzar
- 2010 - En 80 días
- 2009 - La felicidad perfecta
- 2006 - La sombra de nadie
- 2001 - Visionarios (Visionaries)
- 2001 - La voz de su amo (His Master's Voice)
- 1995 - Salto al vacío

=== Television ===
- 2024 - Hay algo en el bosque
- 2019 - La caza. Monteperdido
- 2017 - Estoy vivo
- 2013 - El tiempo entre costuras
- 2013 - Niños robados
- 2013 - La que se avecina
- 2010 - Mi querido Klikowsky
- 2007 - Cuéntame cómo pasó
- 1999 - ¡Qué grande es el teatro!
