= My Daughter Hildegart =

- Theatrical release poster
- Spanish: Mi hija Hildegart
- Directed by: Fernando Fernán Gómez
- Screenplay by: Rafael Azcona; Fernando Fernán Gómez
- Based on: Aurora de sangre by Eduardo de Guzmán
- Produced by: Luis Sanz; Alfredo Matas
- Starring: Amparo Soler Leal; Carmen Roldán; Manuel Galiana; Carlos Velat; Pedro Díez del Corral; José Mª Mompín; Guillermo Marín
- Cinematography: Cecilio Paniagua
- Edited by: Rosa G. Salgado
- Music by: Luis Eduardo Aute
- Production companies: Cámara PC; Jet Films
- Release date: 19 September 1977
- Country: Spain
- Language: Spanish

My Daughter Hildegart (Spanish: Mi hija Hildegart) is a 1977 Spanish film directed by Fernando Fernán Gómez based on the book Aurora de sangre by Eduardo de Guzmán. It stars Amparo Soler Leal as Aurora Rodríguez.

== Plot ==
From account of Eduardo de Guzmán's testimony, the plot moves back to 1933 Madrid, developing the story of Aurora Rodríguez and the path that led her to kill her daughter, wunderkind, sexology specialist, and progressivist pundit Hildegart Rodríguez Carballeira, conceived by Aurora as the fruit of eugenicist utopia.

== Cast ==
- Amparo Soler Leal as Aurora
- Carmen Roldán as Hildegart
- Manuel Galiana as Eduardo de Guzmán
- Carlos Velat as Lucas López
- Pedro Díez del Corral as Villena
- José María Mompín as fiscal
- Guillermo Marín as presidente del tribunal
- Maribel Ayuso as Julia
- Luisa Rodrigo as Emilia

== Release ==
The film was released theatrically in Spain on 19 September 1977. It proved to be successful at the Spanish box office, with over one million admissions.

== See also ==
- List of Spanish films of 1977
