= Pepito Arriola =

Spanish child prodigy pianist and eventual master violinist (1896-1954)

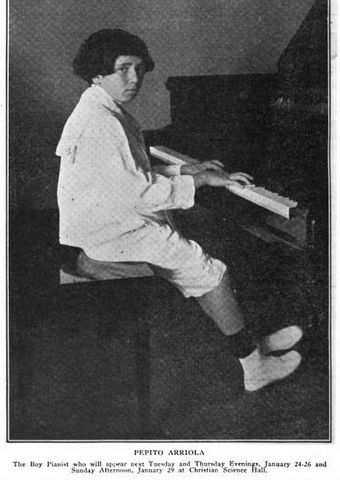
Pepito Arriola, from a 1911 publication.

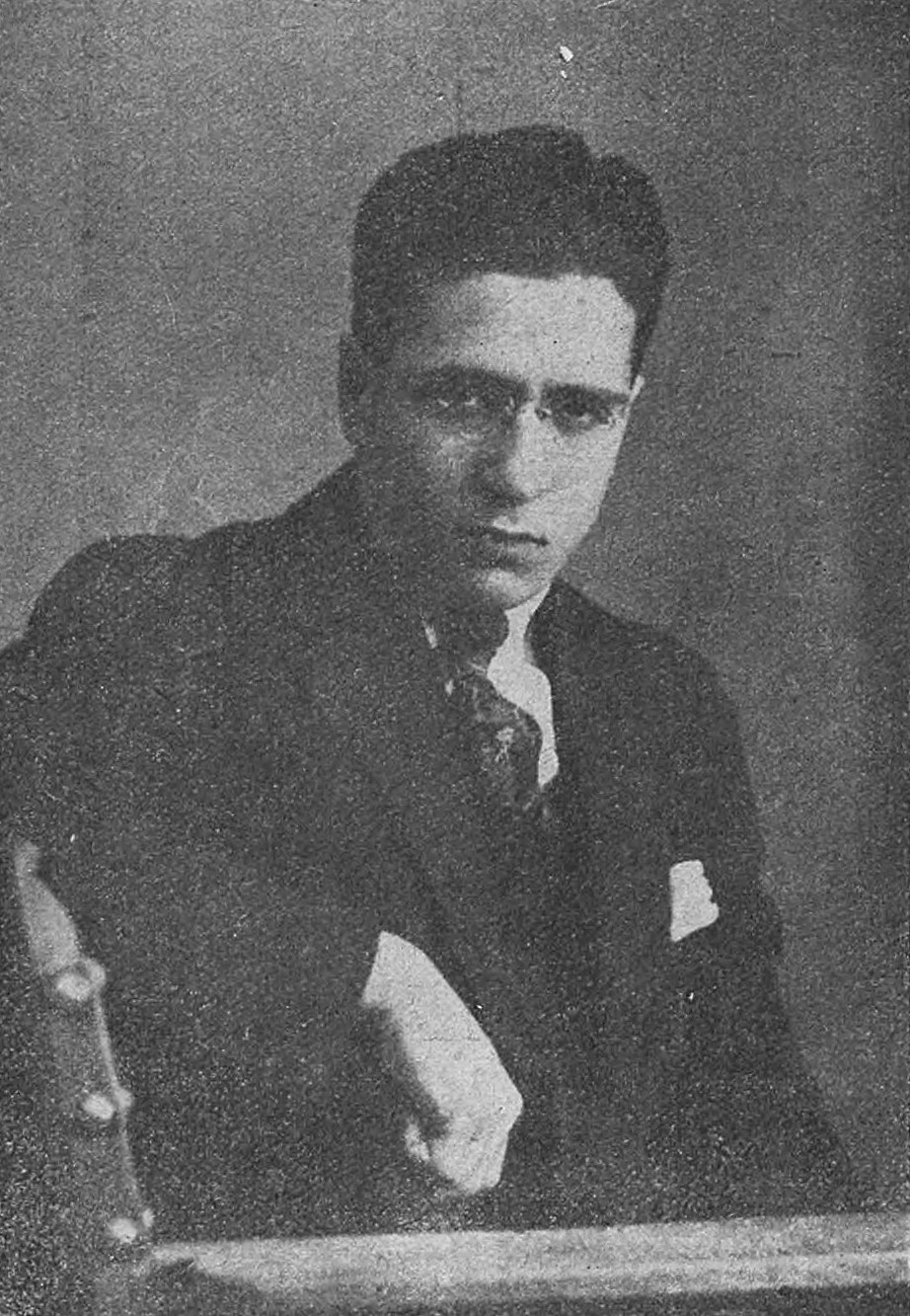
Pepito Arriola, from a 1922 publication.

José "Pepito" Rodríguez Carballeira (December 14, 1895 – October 24, 1954) was a Spanish child prodigy pianist and eventual master violinist.

He was the cousin of Hildegart Rodríguez Carballeira.

== Origins ==
Pepito was born in Ferrol, his mother was Josefa Rodríguez Carballeira and having no known father, his birth certificate has the family name of his mother, which she never used, naming the boy with the last name of his grandfather. After Josefa went to Madrid, his aunt Aurora took care of him and taught him to play piano.

== Career beginning ==
Arriola's remarkable ability was first discovered at the age of two and a half. The story spread by his mother says that she had received a composition from a friend which she played frequently on the home piano. One morning, upon hearing the piece played with accuracy and confidence, Arriola's mother entered the room containing the piano and was astounded when she discovered that her son was responsible for the skilled rendition. The young musician, without any formal or informal instruction, began his career as a pianist, at times playing pieces he had heard and at other times creating original compositions. After his mother noticed the child's abilities, she took him with her to Madrid and his career as a concert pianist began.

== Performances ==
On December 4, 1899, not yet three years old, Pepito Arriola gave his first public performance to an audience of music critics and musicians. Just after his third birthday on December 26 of the same year, Arriola held his second concert in Royal Palace of Madrid in front of King and Queen playing six original compositions. Arriola would go on to become a great violinist as well, impressing the whole of Europe with his later great concerts in the German city of Leipzig and in the Russian capital of St. Petersburg .

In 1911 Arriola appeared at the Elitch Theatre in Denver, Colorado, as reported by Mary Elitch Long: "Denver musicians were given the opportunity to hear Pepito Ariola, the famous boy pianist."

== Original compositions ==
Arriola at the age of three, could read neither music nor written language and thus his process of composition was highly unconventional. He would sometimes use a blank piece of paper, indicating the nature of the piece (sonata, waltz, etc.) with a symbol at the top followed by arbitrary lines and notes which was the written music for the piece. Afterward, he is described as setting the paper down in front of him saying “I will play that” and proceeding to improvise remarkably well. His pieces were described as having a “richness of astonishing expression” ranging from the tragic to the merry.

== In popular culture ==
In the 2024 film The Red Virgin, adult Arriola is played by Fernando Delgado-Hierro and 6-year-old Arriola by Bosco Fernández.

== Complete works ==
- Aurora habanera 1898
- Impresiones nocturnas 1916
- Hommage à Manuel de Falla/Homenaje a Falla 1942

After his death 12 additional scores were found. They were written in Barcelona after his return to Spain in 1946:

- Divertimento concertante 1946
- Tres textos cervantinos voice and orchestra, 1946
- Aqui lloró Don Quixote, 1947
- Tres textos cervantinos for 2 pianos, 1947
- Concerto para trompa horn concert, 1948
- Sehilcht Weise1948
- Song 1948
- Don Quixote in DM 1949
- Seis poesías de Antonio Machado Baritone and orchestra
- Pequena serenata para cello y piano 1951
- Concertino piano e orquestra 1953
- Impresiones Argentinas

== Bibliography ==
- Pepito Arriola, entre mito y realidad, Eva ocampo
- De Pepito a hildegart, Francisco Martínez López
