= Passages (1996 film) =

- Theatrical release poster
- Spanish: Pasajes
- Directed by: Daniel Calparsoro
- Screenplay by: Daniel Calparsoro
- Produced by: Agustín Almodóvar
- Starring: Najwa Nimri; Alfredo Villa; Ion Gabella; Charo López
- Cinematography: Kiko de la Rica
- Edited by: José Salcedo
- Music by: Alberto Iglesias
- Production company: El Deseo
- Distributed by: Warner Española
- Release dates: May 1996 (Cannes); 22 November 1996 (Spain)
- Country: Spain
- Language: Spanish

Passages (Spanish: Pasajes) (Note: The Spanish-language title features a dual meaning comprising both its English-language translation ('Passages') as well as a reference to the town of Pasajes, or Pasaia.) is a 1996 Spanish crime thriller film written and directed by Daniel Calparsoro which stars Najwa Nimri.

== Plot ==
Lesbian petty criminal and gang member Gabi tries to woo older Carmina into becoming her lover and crime partner.

== Cast ==
- Najwa Nimri as Gabi
- Charo López as Carmina
- Alfredo Villa as Manu
- Ion Gabella as Butano
- Carla Calparsoro as Gema
- Kandido Uranga as Pelos
- Arsenio Luna as Topo
- Aldo Sambrell as Madina

== Production ==
The film is an El Deseo (Agustín Almodóvar) production. Shooting locations included Pasaia and Errenteria.

== Release ==
The film premiered at the Directors' Fortnight parallel section of the Cannes International Film Festival. It was released theatrically in Spain on 22 November 1996.

== See also ==
- List of Spanish films of 1996
