= Blinded (1997 film) =

- Directed by: Daniel Calparsoro
- Written by: Daniel Calparsoro
- Produced by: Juan Alexander
- Starring: Najwa Nimri; Alfredo Villa; Elena Irureta
- Cinematography: Gonzalo F. Berridi
- Edited by: José Salcedo
- Music by: Mario de Benito
- Distributed by: Les Films Ariane
- Release dates: 5 September 1997 (Italy); 11 September 1997 (Canada); 7 October 1998 (France)
- Running time: 92 minutes
- Language: Spanish

Blinded (original Spanish title: A ciegas) is a 1997 romantic thriller directed and written by Daniel Calparsoro. Calparsoro was nominated for the Golden Lion award at the 1997 Venice International Film Festival, but lost to Takeshi Kitano's romantic film Hana-bi.

== Plot ==
Marrubi (Najwa Nimri) works at a dry cleaners and must endure the unwanted advances of her boss Clemente (Ramón Barea). However, Marrubi is also a terrorist in the ETA with her lover, Mikel (Alfredo Villa). They target a wealthy businessman for a heist intending to kill him in the process. When Marrubi deliberately shoots her colleague instead of the intended victim, both she and Mikel are on the run. At Mikel's country house, matters are complicated by another one of their group who insists Marrubi be killed for her betrayal. She manages to escape with her son but is left to depend on Clemente who takes her into his mansion that he shares with his submissive wife Paquita (Marivi Bilbao). She must survive Clemente's continual advances while avoiding capture by the authorities or the ETA.

== Cast ==
- Najwa Nimri ... Marrubi
- Ramón Barea ... Clemente
- Alfredo Villa ... Mikel
- Elena Irureta ... Aitzpea
- Marivi Bilbao ... Paquita

== Production ==
The film, as all its director's first productions, stars Calparoso's wife, the actress Najwa Nimri.

== Legacy ==
The film was part of the program "Historia de nuestro cine" in 2019.
