= Hildegart Rodríguez Carballeira =

Spanish activist and intellectual (1914–1933)

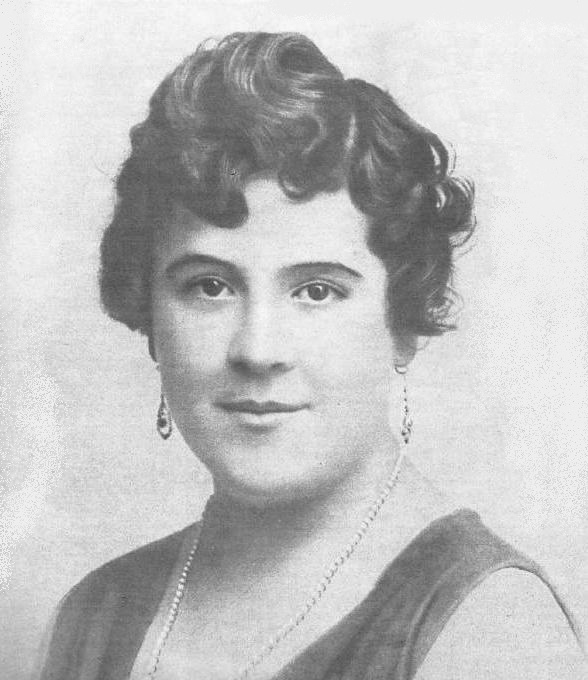
Hildegart Rodríguez

Hildegart Leocadia Georgina Hermenegilda María del Pilar Rodríguez Carballeira (9 December 1914 – 9 June 1933) was an activist for socialism and sexual revolution who was conceived and raised by her anti-theist, socialist, eugenicist, and feminist mother, Aurora Rodríguez Carballeira, as a prototype for the women of the future. She spoke four languages when she was eight years old, finished law school as a teenager, and was a leader of the Spanish Socialist Workers' Party (PSOE) which she abandoned in favor of extreme Republicanism, joining the Federal Democratic Republican Party (PRDF). Her ideology became more critical of Marxism, and she found more alignment with anarchist thought.

When she was 18 years old and had become internationally renowned while also seeking personal and political independence from her controlling mother, her mother shot Hildegart to death in her sleep.

== Early life ==
=== Conception ===
Hildegart was conceived in Ferrol, Spain, by her mother Aurora Rodríguez Carballeira and an unnamed (at the time) biological father. Aurora chose the father with eugenic intentions; she wanted to create the perfect child to further her feminist and socialist ideology. She objectified Hildegart and considered her her own "personal project" and envisioned she would redeem the proletariat and be the "woman of the future". She had previously taken care of her sister's son, Pepito Arriola, giving him musical courses until he became a prodigy, but his mother took him to raise him herself.

As Carballeira had been seeking a man who would never openly claim paternity or legal custody of their child, Hildegart's father was an intellectually brilliant Roman Catholic priest and military chaplain to the Spanish Royal Army, Alberto Pallás. When Carballeira was certain that she was pregnant, she moved to Madrid, where Hildegart was born. During her pregnancy, Aurora had set a clock to wake herself up every hour, allowing her to change sleep position so blood could flow to the fetus uniformly.

=== Name ===
Hildegart's birth certificate and baptism act give her name as Hildegart Leocadia Georgina Hermenegilda María del Pilar Rodríguez Carballeira but she only used her first name. In spite of Aurora's atheism and opposition to birth registration, she had her daughter baptized, somewhat late, on 23 March 1915 and then registered on 29 April 1915. Her mother said that Hildegart meant "Garden of Wisdom" in German, but there is no basis for that and the name was either an invention or an alternative spelling of the Nordic/German name Hildegard.

=== Education ===
She knew how to read at 2, wrote her first letter at age 3, and was able to type before 4. At 10, she spoke German, French and English and the following year at age 11 gave conferences on feminism and female sexuality. Her mother had a strict and complete control on Hildegart's upbringing, forbidding her to do anything which could distract her from "her work."

In June 1928, at the age of 13, Hildegart enrolled in the School of Law of the Complutense University of Madrid, and obtained her Law degree at age 17. She later taught courses at its School of Philosophy after the formation of the Second Spanish Republic.

Hildegart maintained intellectual relationships and correspondence with prominent figures of her time, including physician Gregorio Marañón and author H.G. Wells.

== Activism ==
=== Politics ===
Hildegart Rodríguez's politics were rooted in socialism and feminism, advocating for women's rights, sexual liberation, and social reform, with a focus on dismantling patriarchal structures and advancing a rational, egalitarian society. At 14, she joined the PSOE, like her mother. She was also a member of the Unión General de Trabajadores.

In 1932, she was expelled from the PSOE after publishing an article in La Libertad criticizing the PSOE for supporting a candidate she considered reactionary; she then joined the Federal Party and started attacking those she termed socialenchufistas, and being critical of how the socialists were becoming more bourgeois.

Rodríguez was among the contributors of the Valencia-based Orto magazine.

Like feminist Victoria Kent, Rodríguez did not support female suffrage considering Spanish women were not ready.

=== Sexual revolution ===
Hildegart was one of the most active people in the Spanish movement for sex reformation, writing on subjects such as contraception, prostitution and eugenics. Hildegart Rodríguez advocated for sexual freedom and comprehensive education, seeing sexuality as essential to personal and social liberation. She rejected traditional morality, arguing for the separation of love and reproduction from legal and religious control. She advocated for sexual education at schools from a scientific perspective, and encouraged young people to explore their sexuality with safety and hygiene. She wrote extensively about women's right to birth control access. Her views promoted women's autonomy and free love as key to dismantling patriarchal constraints.

It is understood that despite her strong advocacy for sexual freedom and autonomy, Hildegart Rodríguez remained celibate, possibly due to the strict control exerted by her mother, Aurora Rodríguez, who heavily influenced all aspects of her life, and because she died at only 18 years of age.

She was connected to the European vanguard, corresponding with physician Havelock Ellis, whose work she translated and who nicknamed her "the Red Virgin", and Margaret Sanger. At the foundation of the Spanish League for Sexual Reform on 1932, presided over by Dr Gregorio Marañón, she was chosen as Secretary without opposition.

She had correspondence with many other European personalities, and accompanied the author H. G. Wells on a visit he made to Madrid, but declined his offer to relocate to London and become his secretary. This offer by Wells, who was reportedly very concerned and wanted Hildegart away from the influence of her mother, furthered the persecution complex already felt by Aurora.

== Murder and legacy ==
=== Murder ===
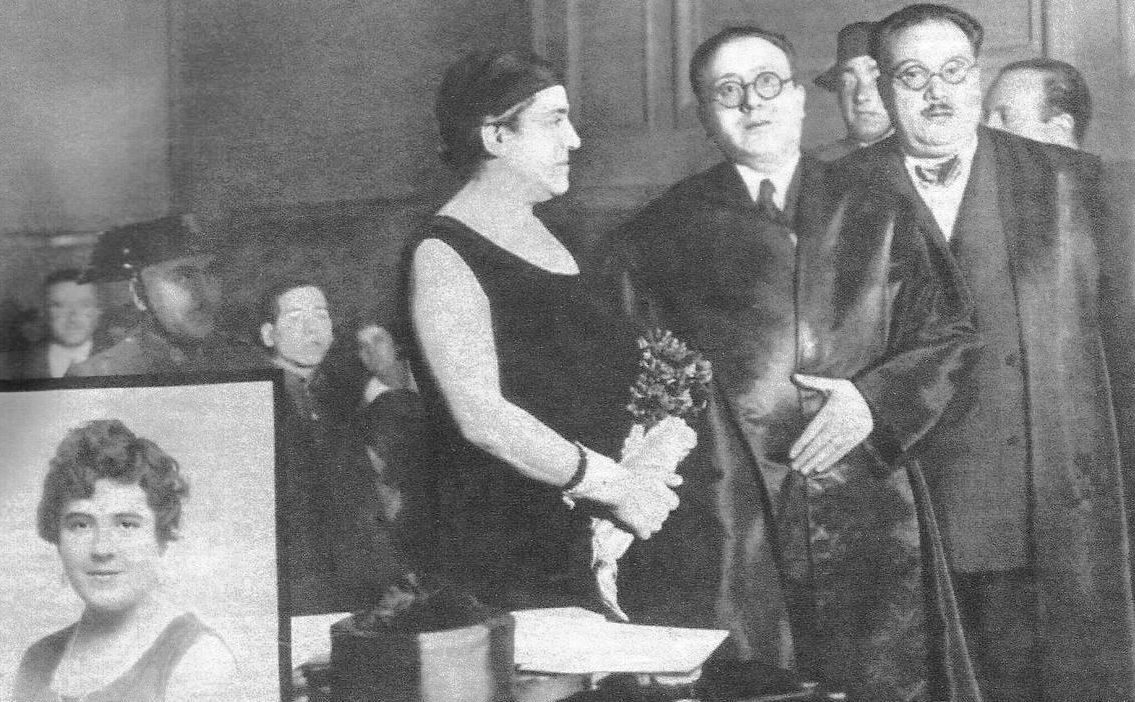
Aurora Rodríguez Carballeira being tried for the murder of her daughter

On June 9 of 1933, Aurora asked her maid to go out to the street to walk their dog. She then shot her daughter four times while she slept in her bed, shooting her in her chest once and her face three times. There were several hypotheses about the motivations behind Hildegart's murder. Her mother, who had envisioned Hildegart as a feminist of the future and an intellectual leader of the revolution, felt that she had lost control as her daughter who had become more politically militant and with an ideology that differed slightly from her mother's strict parameters. Hildegart had also been invited to travel to England encouraged by H.G. Wells, which Aurora may have also interpreted as a threat for her complete control over her daughter. Hildegart may have fallen in love. She intended to separate from her mother who, out of paranoia, had threatened to commit suicide. Aurora explained her actions thusly: "El escultor, tras descubrir la más mínima imperfección en su obra, la destruye" ("The sculptor, after discovering the most minimal imperfection in her work, destroys it.") Ultimately, Aurora regarded herself as having full ownership of Hildegart and considered her a "failed project" she had the right to end.

=== Aftermath ===
Aurora was tried for murder in Madrid. At her trial, she claimed that a Catalan lawyer, Antonio Villena, H. G. Wells, and Havelock Ellis were the agents of an international conspiracy to have her daughter leave Spain and make her serve the Intelligence Services and that, furthermore, Antonio Villena and Hildegart were lovers. She was sentenced to imprisonment for twenty-six years, eight months, ten days, to which she responded that she had won twenty-six years to live, expressing joy she had not been locked away in an asylum. Aurora never regretted Hildegart's murder and repeatedly said that she would have done it again.

Until her medical records resurfaced in 1977, Aurora was incorrectly believed to have been secretly removed from prison by the Nationalist faction and subjected to summary execution and secret burial as part of the White Terror during the Spanish Civil War. In reality, Aurora was imprisoned in 1933, expressing her intention to advocate for prison reform while incarcerated. In 1935, she was transferred from prison to the mental institution in Ciempozuelos, Madrid, having been diagnosed with paranoia and schizophrenia. During her stay, she received more privileged treatment than other patients, residing in a larger individual room and keeping a cat as a pet. She reportedly had good relationships with the nuns at times, even agreeing to go to church as an observer, and expressing concern for their not taking vacation time. From 1941, she stopped speaking to her psychiatrists. The following year, she constructed male and female rag dolls with prominent genitalia out of desire to demystify the sexual organs; these were confiscated and destroyed by the hospital orderlies.

In a 1948 letter to the mother superior of the nuns running the mental institution, Aurora argued that she had spent a long time in prison and deserved to be pardoned. Instead, she died of cancer in 1955 and was buried in a communal grave.

== Selected works ==
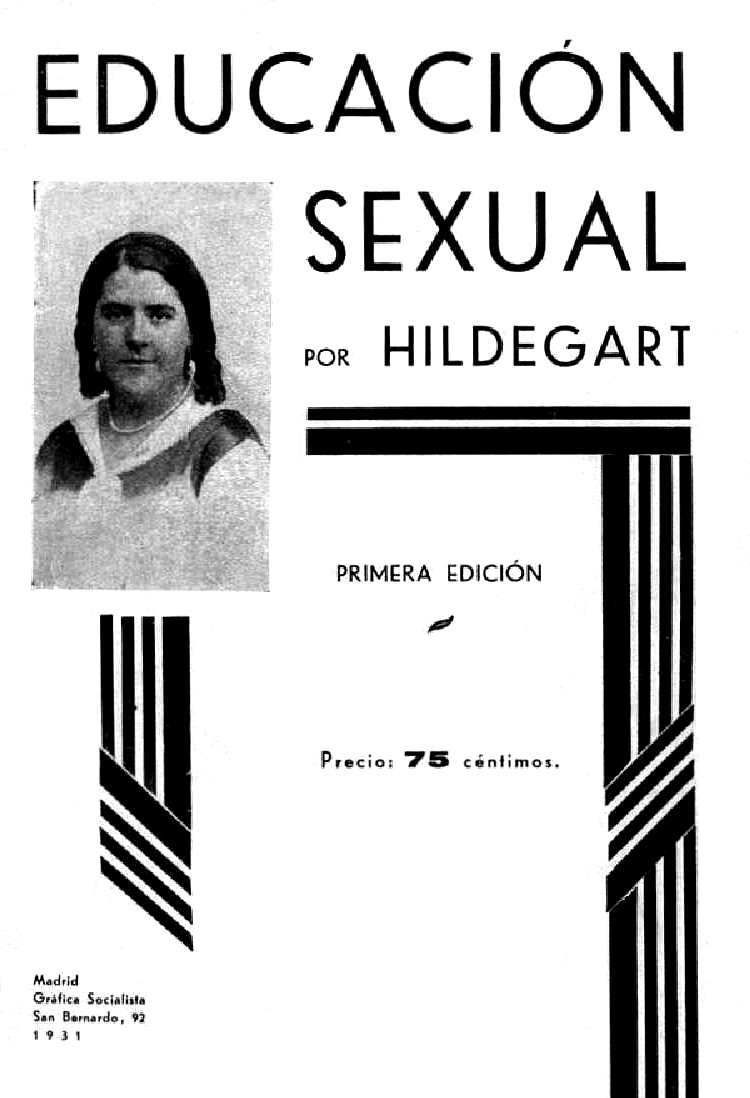
Educación Sexual by Hildegart. 1931.

- ———— (1931). La rebeldía sexual de la juventud [The sexual rebellion of youth] (in Spanish). Madrid: Javier Morata. OCLC 796327706.
- ———— (1931). Profilaxis anticoncepcional: paternidad voluntaria [Contraceptive prophylaxis: voluntary parenthood] (in Spanish). Valencia: Pascual Quiles. OCLC 433153722.
- ———— (1931). El problema sexual tratado por una mujer española [The sexual problem treated by a Spanish woman]. Temas de nuestro tiempo (in Spanish). Madrid: Javier Morata. OCLC 796327706.
- ———— (1932). Malthusimo y neomalthusismo: control de la natilidad [Malthusianism and neo-Malthusianism: birth control]. Temas de nuestro tiempo (in Spanish). Madrid: Javier Morata. OCLC 1120227605.
- ———— (1932). ¿Se equivocó Marx? [Was Marx wrong?] (in Spanish). Madrid: Ediciónes Boro. OCLC 45772419.
- ———— (1932). ¿Quo vadis, burguesía? [Where are you going, bourgeoisie?]. La Novela Proletaria (in Spanish). Vol. 1. Madrid: Libertad. OCLC 828269832.
- ———— (1937). Métodos para evitar el embarazo (Paternidad voluntaria) [Methods to avoid pregnancy (Voluntary parenthood)]. Ediciones Julio Pi-Mataró. OCLC 1004300994.

== Works inspired by her life ==
=== Novels ===
- de Guzmán, Eduardo (1972). Aurora de sangre: vida y muerte de Hildegart [Dawn of blood: life and death of Hildegart] (in Spanish). Madrid: G del Toro. ISBN 9788431201555. LCCN 74326052. OCLC 500448024.
- Azcona, Rafael; Fernán Gómez, Fernando; de Guzmán, Eduardo (1977). Aurora de sangre o la virgen roja: guión cinematográfico [Dawn of Blood or The Red Virgin] (in Spanish). Jet Films. OCLC 433750760.
- Hackl, Erich (1987). Auroras Anlaß [Aurora's Motive] (in German). Zürich: Diogenes. ISBN 9783257217315. OL 9021363M.
- Arrabal, Fernando (1987). La virgen roja [The Red Virgin]. Biblioteca breve (in Spanish) (1a ed.). Barcelona: Seix Barral. ISBN 9788432205644. OCLC 434822000.
- Hackl, Erich (1989). Aurora's Motive. Translated by McCown, Edna (1st American ed.). Alfred A. Knopf. ISBN 0394573285. LCCN 88045318. OL 2062028M – via Internet Archive.
- Grandes, Almudena La madre de Frankenstein.

=== Films ===
- Fernán Gómez, Fernando (1977-09-16). Mi hija Hildegart [My daughter Hildegart] (in Spanish).
- Pye, Sheila (2012-10-18). The Red Virgin.
- The Red Virgin (2024), directed by Paula Ortiz, with Najwa Nimri as Aurora and Alba Planas as Hildegart.
