= Asfalto =

- Theatrical release poster
- Directed by: Daniel Calparsoro
- Screenplay by: Daniel Calparsoro; Santiago Tabernero; Frank Palacios
- Produced by: José María Lara
- Starring: Najwa Nimri; Juan Diego Botto; Gustavo Salmerón; Alfredo Villa; Antonia San Juan
- Cinematography: Josep M. Civit
- Edited by: Julia Juániz
- Music by: Mastreta; Najwajean
- Release date: 4 February 2000
- Running time: 90 minutes
- Countries: Spain; France
- Language: Spanish

Asfalto (English: Asphalt) is a 2000 Spanish-French drama film directed by Daniel Calparsoro. It stars Najwa Nimri, Juan Diego Botto, and Gustavo Salmerón.

== Plot ==
Set in Madrid, the plot tracks the romantic triangle between Lucía, Chino, and Charly.

== Cast ==
- Najwa Nimri as Lucía
- Juan Diego Botto as Charly
- Gustavo Salmerón as Chino
- Alfredo Villa as Antonio
- Antonia San Juan as Clarita
- Roger Ibáñez as Luis
- Javier Nogueiras as Paco
- Rubén Ochandiano as Miguel
- Jeff Bigot as Franzose
- Carla Calparsoro as Mamen

== Production ==
Asfalto is Calparsoro's fourth feature and his fourth and last to star his then wife, the actress Najwa Nimri. The couple divorced in 2000.

== Nominations ==
Asfalto was nominated at the Goya Awards for the Best Original Score.

== Legacy ==
Asfalto was part of the program Historia de nuestro cine in 2019.

The film is noted for being rooted in the Basque heritage of its director and, according to The A to Z of Spanish Cinema, was for him a "return to marginal backgrounds and wild urban landscapes".

== See also ==
- List of Spanish films of 2000
