= Mariví Bilbao =

Spanish actress (1930–2013)

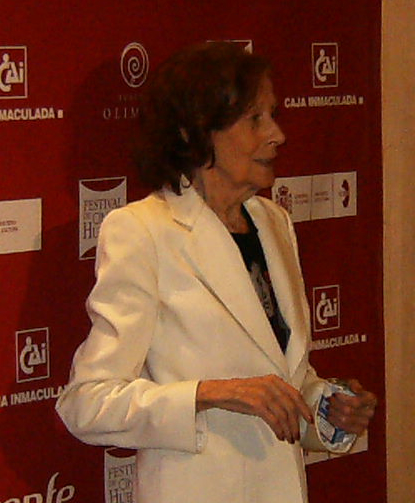
- Bilbao in 2008
- Born: María Victoria Bilbao-Goyoaga Álvarez; 22 January 1930; Bilbao (Biscay), Spain
- Died: 3 April 2013 (aged 83); Bilbao (Biscay), Spain
- Occupation: Actor
- Spouse: Javier Urquijo (b. 1939 – d. 2003)
- Children: Elvira Urquijo Bilbao-Goyoaga (b. 1969 – d. 2015)

María Victoria Bilbao-Goyoaga Álvarez (22 January 1930 – 3 April 2013) better known by her stage name Mariví Bilbao was a Spanish actress, especially famous for her roles as Marisa Benito in Aquí no hay quien viva and Izaskun Sagastume in La que se avecina TV series.

== Biography ==
=== Career ===
Born in Bilbao in 1930, she soon began acting in theater productions with the group Hispanic Culture of Bilbao (Cultura Hispánica de Bilbao) and with Akelarre, a group which she founded. According to the actress herself, she originally did not act under her own name, instead using the name Angela Valverde: "Bilbao was a little town. My father would have killed me if my name had appeared in the newspaper."

She made her cinematic debut in the short films The Interrogation of F. Bardají (La interrogación de F. Bardají) and Javier Aguirre's 1962 Unusual Beach (Playa insolita). She also appeared in Irrintzi (1978), directed by Mirentxu Txomin Loyarte, and Agur (1979), directed by Javier Rebollo and Juanma Ortuoste.

In 1981, she played a prominent role in Seven Streets (Siete calles), directed by Juanma Ortuoste and Javier Rebollo, two filmmakers with whom she has been linked throughout her career. This was her first role in a feature film and from that moment she became one of the most reliable and effective secondary film actresses of Euskadi, where she has focused for almost her entire career.

In recognition of her professional career, Basque Actors Association awarded her the El Abrazo award in 1996 and the newspaper El Mundo awarded her the Séller Award in 1997.

She gained most of her popularity with her role in the hit series Aquí no hay quien viva on Antena 3, where she worked for more than three years under Alberto Caballero. In 2007, Telecinco released a new series with the same cast and crew, but with different characters, called La que se avecina.

She has worked throughout her career in various programs on ETB (Basque regional television).

In 2006, she was elected by popular vote as the holidays herald the Big Week of Bilbao.

In March 2007, she attended the 79th Oscar awards, as the short film Éramos pocos (One Too Many), directed by Borgia Cobeaga and starring Bilbao opposite Ramón Barea, was nominated for Best Live Action Short Film. This was her second collaboration on a short film by filmmaker Cobeaga; two years earlier, she worked with him on the short film La primera vez (The First Time), for which she won the award for best actress at the Orense and Malaga film festivals. She also went to the Venice Film Festival with Alumbramiento (Childbirth), directed by Eduardo Chapero-Jackson, which won the Golden Lion for Best European Short at the Official Short.

On 14 June 2008 she was awarded the City of Huesca International Award at the Huesca International Film Festival, in recognition of her professional career as an actress.

In 2013, she partially retired from television, restricting herself to recording brief announcements.

== Personal life ==
Bilbao was also a regular contributor to the multiple sclerosis campaign Mójate por la esclerosis múltiple held annually in support of those affected by multiple sclerosis in the Basque Country.

She married twice—once to the artist and art critic Javier Urquijo (1939–2003). They had a daughter, Elvira, who died on 2 February 2015 in Bilbao at the age of 45.

She died at her home in Bilbao on 3 April 2013, aged 83.

== Filmography ==
=== Film ===
- Maktub (2011)
- No controles (2010)
- Sukalde kontuak (2009)
- Trío de ases: el secreto de la Atlántida (2008)
- El Calentito (2005)
- El chocolate del loro (2005)
- La mirada violeta (2004)
- Carmen (2003)
- Torremolinos 73 (2003)
- Marujas asesinas (2001)
- La comunidad (2000)
- Aunque tú no lo sepas (2000)
- Las huellas borradas (1999)
- Ione, sube al cielo (1999)
- Pecata minuta (1999)
- Entre todas las mujeres (1998)
- A ciegas (1997)
- Calor... y celos (1996)
- Malena es un nombre de tango (1996)
- Pasajes (1996)
- Salto al vacío (1995)
- Sálvate si puedes (1995)
- No me compliques la vida (1991)
- El mar es azul (1989)
- Eskorpion (1988)
- Siete Calles (1981)

=== Short film ===
- Lala (2009)
- Atardecer (2009)
- Sótano (2008)
- Alumbramiento (2007)
- Trío de ases (2006)
- Éramos pocos (2005)
- Entre nosotros (2005)
- Tercero B (2002)
- Terminal (2002)
- La primera vez (2001)
- Hyde & Jekill (2000)
- Jardines deshabitados (2000)
- Amor de madre (1999)
- El trabajo (1999)
- Adiós Toby, adiós (1995)
- Lourdes de segunda mano (1995)
- La leyenda de un hombre malo (1994)
- Agur, Txomin (1981)
- Irrintzi (1978)
- Playa insólita (1962)
- Almuñécar (1961)
- Amores (1959)

=== Television ===
- La que se avecina (81 episodes, 2007–2013) as Izaskun Sagastume
- Apaga la luz (2007)
- Aquí no hay quien viva (90 episodes, 2003–2006) as Marisa Benito
- El show de la 3 (2005)
- Mis estimadas víctimas (2005)
- Entre dos fuegos (1998)
- A tortas con la vida (1 episode, 2005)
- Periodistas (2 episodes, 2002)
- Hospital Central (2 episodes, 2001)
- Raquel busca su sitio (1 episode, 2000)
- Manos a la obra (2 episodes, 1998)
- Al salir de clase (2 episodes, 1997)
