= Mikaela (film) =

- Theatrical release poster
- Directed by: Daniel Calparsoro
- Written by: Arturo Ruiz Serrano
- Produced by: Jaime Ortiz de Artiñano; Jorge Sánchez Gallo; Javier Ugarte
- Starring: Antonio Resines; Natalia Azahara; Roger Casamajor; Pavel Anton; Cristina Kovani; Adriana Torrebejano; Javier Albalá; Patricia Vico
- Cinematography: Tommie Ferreras
- Edited by: Antonio Frutos
- Music by: Carlos Jean
- Production companies: Atresmedia Cine; Atlantia Media; La Terraza Films; Ikiru Films; AP6 La Película AIE
- Distributed by: Buena Vista International
- Release date: 31 January 2025
- Country: Spain
- Language: Spanish

Mikaela is a 2025 Spanish action thriller film directed by Daniel Calparsoro and written by Arturo Ruiz Serrano starring Antonio Resines and Natalia Azahara alongside Roger Casamajor and Adriana Torrebejano.

== Plot ==
On the eve of Three King's Day, a police agent on his last legs (Leo) is trapped in the motorway in the wake of the effects of a powerful snowstorm in Spain, teaming up with a young aspiring Guardia Civil agent fresh off from the academy, to face an assault on an armored van by a gang of robbers.

== Cast ==
- Antonio Resines as Leo
- Natalia Azahara
- Adriana Torrebejano as Alicia
- Roger Casamajor as Jon
- Pavel Anton as Erik
- Cristina Kovani as Ivana
- Oleg Kricunova as Pavel
- Peter Nikolas as Roman
- Javier Albalá as Carlos
- Patricia Vico
- Rocío Muñoz-Cobo
- Bernabé Fernández
- Richard Holmes
- Mario Zorrilla

== Production ==
Originally known under the working title of AP6: infierno en la autopista, Mikaela was produced by Atresmedia Cine, La Terraza Films, Atlantia Media, Ikiru Films, and AP6 La Película AIE. It had the backing from Atresmedia, Netflix, and Vodafone. Shooting locations included the Madrid region and the province of Segovia.

== Release ==
The film was released theatrically in Spain by Buena Vista International on 31 January 2025.

== Reception ==
Raquel Hernández Luján of HobbyConsolas gave the film 70 points ('good'), singling out its "good" balance between action and humor, its pace, and its "tight" running time as the best things about it, while warning that it is pure entertainment that will not change anyone's life.

Juan Pando of Fotogramas rated the film 3 out of 5 stars, citing the plot twist involving Cristina Kovani as the best thing about the film, while mentioning the "fake" lovestory between the civil guard agent and the public servant as the worst thing about it.

Carlos Boyero, film critic of El País (and long friend of Resines), wrote that "everything [in the film] is correct", but also "forgettable".

Enid Román Almansa of Cinemanía rated the film 3 out of 5 stars, deeming it to be "yet another action movie, entertaining and easy to watch", in which the best thing is the "adorable" mini-romance between the supporting characters.

== See also ==
- List of Spanish films of 2025
