= Lost & Found (2022 film) =

- Theatrical release poster
- Spanish: Objetos
- Directed by: Jorge Dorado
- Screenplay by: Natxo López
- Starring: Álvaro Morte; China Suárez; Verónica Echegui; Daniel Aráoz; Andy Gorostiaga; Maitane San Nicolás; Selva Alemán; Zorion Eguileor
- Cinematography: David Acereto
- Music by: Eric Claus Kuschevatzky
- Production companies: Tandem; Films; Setembro Cine; Tormenta Films; La Maleta Perdida AIE; Pampa Films; In Post We Trust; Rexin Film
- Distributed by: Filmax (Spain); Star Distribution (Latin America)
- Release dates: 17 September 2022 (Santander); 30 September 2022 (Spain); 18 May 2023 (Argentina)
- Running time: 107 minutes
- Countries: Spain; Argentina; Germany
- Language: Spanish
- Box office: $539,479

Lost & Found (Spanish: Objetos, lit. 'Objects') is a 2022 thriller film directed by Jorge Dorado from a screenplay by Natxo López which stars Álvaro Morte, China Suárez, and Verónica Echegui. It is a Spanish-Argentine-German co-production.

== Plot ==
The plot follows surly lost & found worker Mario who, upon handling a lost suitcase with human remains inside, gets involved in a criminal investigation pertaining human trafficking and luxury prostitution.

== Cast ==
- Álvaro Morte as Mario
- China Suárez as Sara
- Verónica Echegui as Helena
- Daniel Aráoz
- Andy Gorostiaga
- Maitane San Nicolás
- Selva Alemán
- Zorion Eguileor

== Production ==
Lost & Found is a Spain-Argentina-Germany co-production, by Tandem Films alongside Setembro Cine, Tormenta Films, La Maleta Perdida AIE, Pampa Films, In Post We Trust and Rexin Film. It also had the participation of RTVE, Prime Video, ZDF, and Telemadrid; and funding from ICAA, INCAA, the Madrid regional administration, Ibermedia, Ayuntamiento de Madrid, ICO, and Crea SGR. It was shot in between Madrid and the province of Jujuy.

== Release ==
Filmax nabbed international sales rights for the film. The film was selected for a 17 September 2022 pre-screening as the closing film of the 6th Santander Film Festival. Distributed by Filmax, it was theatrically released in Spain on 30 September 2022. It was release theatrically in Argentina on 18 May 2023.

== Reception ==
Toni Vall of Cinemanía rated the film 3 out of 5 stars, considering that, featuring an interesting detective premise about human trafficking, it is "effective almost all the time, extraordinarily filmed", yet also "suffers at times from a certain precipitation" and a lack of plausibility.

Raquel Hernández Luján of HobbyConsolas rated the film 57 out of 100 points ("so-so") highlighting the beginning, the performance by Echegui and the cameo by Eguileor as the best things about the film, which stars to fall apart upon the exploration of the luxury prostitution network due to "its lack of congruence".

Manuel J. Lombardo of Diario de Sevilla rated the film 2 out of 5 stars, considering that it features one of those genre scripts in which there is "hardly anything authentic left to scratch" behind its "carcass of stereotypes, [common] themes and commonplaces".

== See also ==
- List of Spanish films of 2022
- List of Argentine films of 2023
