= Walkabout (Najwa Nimri album) =

Studio album by Najwa Nimri
- Released: February 6, 2006
- Genre: Electronica, Dance, Alternative, Classical, Trip Hop
- Length: 41:36
- Label: DRO Atlantic
- Producer: Raúl "SupercineXcene" Santos

Najwa Nimri chronology
Mayday (2003)	Walkabout (2006)

Walkabout is the third studio album by Najwa Nimri, released in 2006. There are 6 songs on this album, including: I Like It, Just in Case, Sexy Light, One of These Days, Le mien le tiene and Being Safe.

== Track listing ==
1. "I'll Wait For Us" – 5:20
2. "So Often" – 4:48
3. "Just in Case" – 3:42
4. "Capable" – 3:29
5. "Push It" – 3:36
6. "Le tien, le mien" – 4:28
7. "I Like It" – 4:59
8. "Sexy Light" – 3:51
9. "One of Those Days" – 3:48
10. "Being Safe" – 3:35

== Singles ==
- "Capable" – January 23, 2006
- "Push It"
- "Le Tien, Le Mien"
