= Walkabout Resources =

Mining company in Perth, Western Australia

- Company type: Public
- Traded as: ASX: WKT
- Industry: Resources
- Predecessor: Nimrodel Resources
- Founded: 2011
- Headquarters: Perth, Western Australia
- Area served: Africa, British Isles
- Key people: Andrew Cunningham (chief executive); Michael Elliott (non-executive chair)
- Products: Graphite, base metals, gold
- Total assets: ▼ A$1,192,360 (2020)
- Total equity: ▼ A$16,990,619 (2020)
- Website: wkt.com.au

Walkabout Resources is an Australian-based minerals developer with projects in Tanzania, Northern Ireland, Scotland and Namibia.

== History ==
Founded in Perth, Western Australia, Walkabout Resources entered the Australian Securities Exchange in 2011 through a reverse listing with Nimrodel Resources. The company's stated goal is to explore and develop diverse mineral projects in Africa.

Early exploration activity included the Takatokwane coal project in Botswana and two projects in Tanzania – copper at Kigoma and platinum group elements at Makete.

The company was accepted into the European Raw Materials Alliance in May 2021.

November 2024 Walkabout Resources went into voluntary administration.

== Operations ==
=== Lindi Jumbo ===
Discovered in 2015, Walkabout Resources is developing the Lindi Jumbo graphite project in south-east Tanzania, 200km from the port of Mtwara. The deposit contains high-grade (17.9% TGC) natural large flake graphite concentrate, with up to 50% of the total graphite in the premium priced super jumbo (+500 μm) and jumbo (+300 μm) categories. Construction commenced in late 2021 with equity funding. US$20m of Debt funding with Gemcorp was secured in July 2023 and construction was due to be completed in late 2023. 100% of graphite concentrate offtake has been contracted to Wogen International.

=== Other projects ===
As of 2021, Walkabout Resources is carrying out exploration programmes for gold and base metals in Northern Ireland, Scotland and Tanzania.
