= Jump into the Void =

- Theatrical release poster
- Spanish: Salto al vacío
- Directed by: Daniel Calparsoro
- Screenplay by: Daniel Calparsoro
- Produced by: Enrique Fernández Ayuso
- Starring: Najwa Nimry; Roberto Shalu; Alfredo Villa; Ion Gabella; Karra Elejalde; Kándido Uranga; Saturnino García
- Cinematography: Kiko de la Rica
- Edited by: Pite Piñas
- Production companies: Yumping Films; Siurell Producciones; Fernando Colomo PC
- Release dates: 17 February 1995 (Berlinale); 3 March 1995 (Spain)
- Country: Spain
- Language: Spanish

Jump into the Void (Spanish: Salto al vacío) is a 1995 Spanish urban crime drama film written and directed by Daniel Calparsoro (in his directorial debut film). It stars Najwa Nimri, Roberto Chalu, Alfredo Villa, and Ion Gabella.

== Plot ==
Set against the backdrop of youth living in the industry-heavy peripheral urban areas, the plot follows the plight of young arms trafficker and gang member Alex and her unrequited cravings for love and affection.

== Cast ==
- Najwa Nimri as Alex
- Roberto Chalu as Javi
- Alfredo Villa as Esteban
- Ion Gabella as Toño
- Karra Elejalde as Juáncar
- Kandido Uranga as Alberto
- Saturnino García as Luis
- Carla Calparsoro as Fati
- Mariví Bilbao as María
- Noemí Parra as Eva

== Production ==
The film is a Yumping Films, Siurell Producciones and Fernando Colomo PC production, with the participation of TVE, Canal+ and Filmanía. Shooting locations included Barakaldo and Sestao.

== Release ==
The film premiered in the 'Panorama' section of the 45th Berlin International Film Festival on 17 February 1995. It was released theatrically in Spain on 3 March 1995.

== Reception ==
David Stratton of Variety assessed that the "ultra-violent pic" [...] "is leavened by the surprisingly tender treatment of the principal femme character, beautifully played by Najwa Nimry", otherwise writing that it "has 'cult' written all over it".

Augusto Martínez Torres of El País wrote that despite the film being "full of irregularities", the helmer manages "a very personal work, a tender feminine portrait within the most terrible violence".

== See also ==
- List of Spanish films of 1995
