= Daniel Calparsoro =

Spanish film director (born 1968)

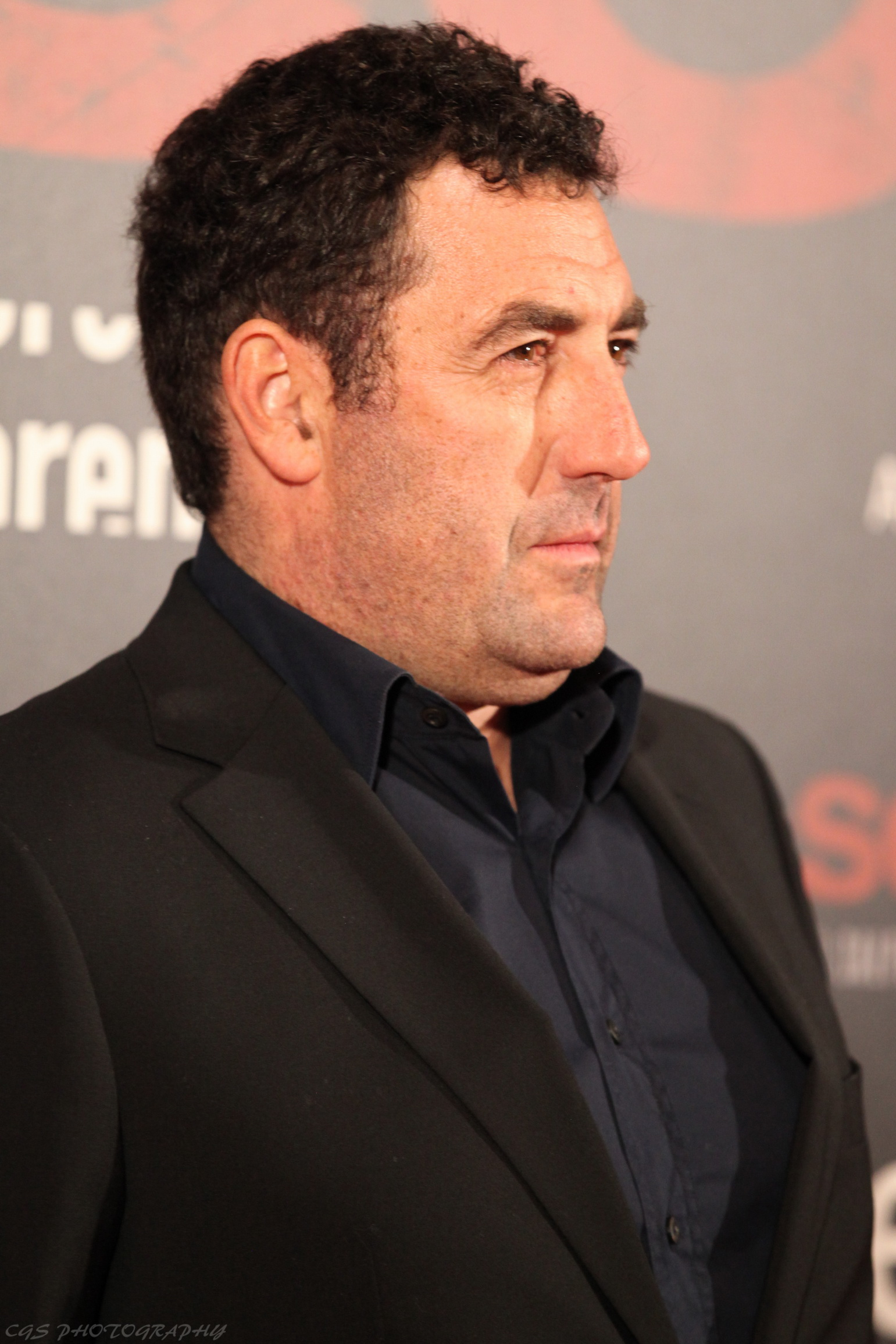
- Born: Daniel Calparsoro López-Tapia; 11 May 1968 (age 58); Barcelona, Spain
- Occupation: Film director
- Years active: 1995–present
- Spouses: Najwa Nimri (m. 1995; div. 2000); Patricia Vico (m. circa 2006)

Daniel Calparsoro López-Tapia (born 11 May 1968) is a Spanish filmmaker, considered one of Spain's most adept action film directors.

== Biography ==
Daniel Calparsoro López-Tapia was born in Barcelona on 11 May 1968, although he was raised in between Hondarribia and San Sebastián, in Gipuzkoa. He studied Political Science in Madrid simultaneously with filmmaking studies, the latter of which he further advanced in New York. From 1995 to 2000, he was married to actress and singer Najwa Nimri. He married actress Patricia Vico circa 2006.

== Filmography ==
=== Feature films ===
Year	Title	Director	Writer
1995	Jump into the Void	Yes	Yes
1996	Passages	Yes	Yes
1997	Blinded	Yes	Yes
2000	Asfalto	Yes	Yes
2002	Guerreros	Yes	Yes
2005	The Absent	Yes	Yes
2012	Invader	Yes	No
2013	Combustion	Yes	Yes
2016	To Steal from a Thief	Yes	No
2016	Testimonio (Note: Short film for the anthology film "Kalebegiak")	Yes	Yes
2018	The Warning	Yes	No
2019	Twin Murders: The Silence of the White City	Yes	No
2020	Sky High	Yes	No
2022	Centauro	Yes	No
2023	All the Names of God	Yes	No
2024	The Courier	Yes	No
2025	Mikaela	Yes	No
2026	The Confidant	Yes	No

=== TV Series ===
Year	Title	Director	Writer	Creator
2008	The Punishment	Yes	Yes	Yes
2009	La ira	Yes	Yes	Yes
2010	Inocentes	Yes	Yes	Yes
2013	Tormenta	Yes	Yes	Yes
2016	Víctor Ros	Yes (Note: Directed episode: "Ave del paraíso")	No	No
2017	Apaches	Yes	No	No
2018-2019	Todo por el juego	Yes	No	Yes
2023	Sky High	Yes	No	Yes
2026	Salvador	Yes	No	No
