= Najwa Nimri =

Spanish actress and singer (born 1972)

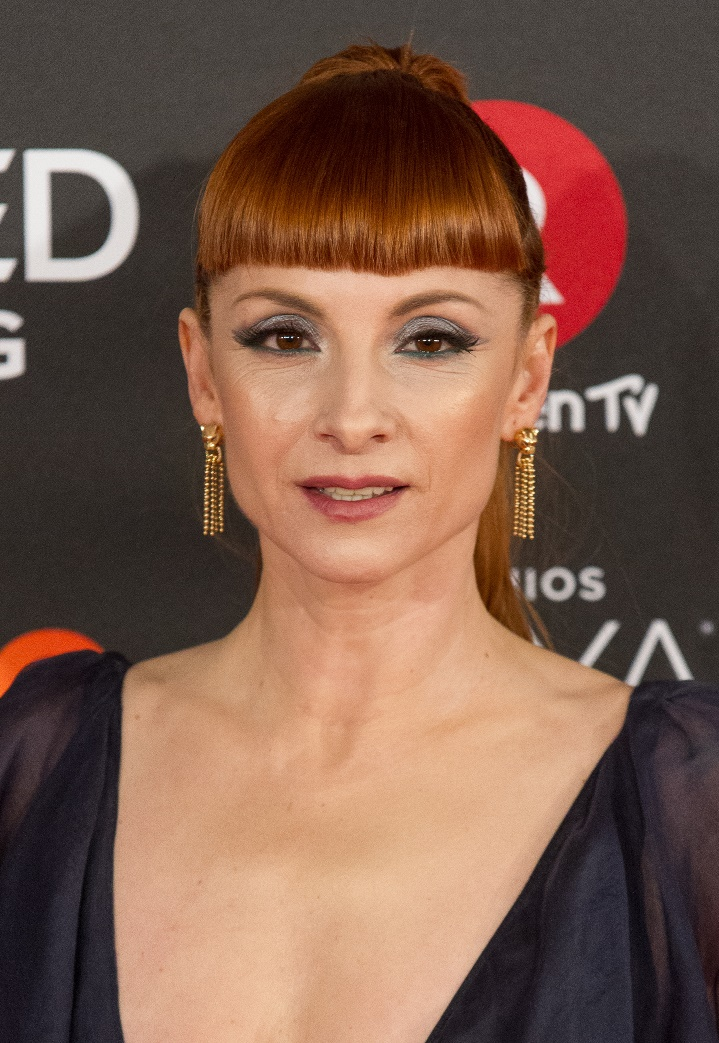
- Nimri in 2018
- Born: Najwa Nimri Urrutikoetxea; 14 February 1972 (age 54); Pamplona, Spain
- Occupations: Actress, singer
- Years active: 1995–present
- Musical career
- Genres: Trip hop; downtempo; alternative rock
- Instrument: Vocals
- Formerly of: Najwajean (with Carlos Jean)
- Spouse: Daniel Calparsoro (m. 1995; div. 2000)

Najwa Nimri Urrutikoetxea (Spanish: [ˈnaʝwa ˈnimri urutikoeˈtʃea]; born 14 February 1972) is a Spanish actress and singer. Her accolades include nominations for three Goya Awards, a CEC Award, a Forqué Award, and three Feroz Awards.

Nimri made her acting debut in 1995 in the Spanish film Jump into the Void. Her other films include Passages (1996), Open Your Eyes (1997), Blinded (1997), Lovers of the Arctic Circle (1998), Asfalto (2000), Sex and Lucia (2001), and Fausto 5.0 (2001), The Method (2005), Anything You Want (2010), Quién te cantará (2018), and The Red Virgin (2024). She became a prominent actor of 1990s and 2000s Spanish cinema. Her international profile increased in the streaming era for her work in the Spanish prison drama series Locked Up (2015–2020) and the heist series Money Heist (2019–2021).

In 1996, Nimri formed the musical duo Najwajean with producer Carlos Jean, releasing No Blood, an early instance of a trip-hop album in Spain.

== Early life ==
Nimri was born in Pamplona, Spain. Her mother is Spanish and her father is Jordanian. She has a brother, a half-brother and two half-sisters. When she was a child, her family moved to Bilbao, Basque Country, where she was raised. Her parents separated when she was 11, and at age 17 she moved to Madrid, where she pursued the performing arts, took acting classes and sang in a funk band.

== Career ==
Her first major film role was in Salto al vacío, the first movie by film director Daniel Calparsoro. Her career as a singer started with small groups. In 1996, she formed the band Najwajean with Carlos Jean. She has also released three solo albums. From 1995 to 2000, she was married to Daniel Calparsoro.

Several of her film roles won her praise: as Ana in Lovers of the Arctic Circle, and as Elena in Sex and Lucia. Both films were directed by Julio Medem. She starred next to Eduardo Noriega in Abre los ojos, and El método.

She was nominated to the Goya Award for Best Actress for her performance as amnesiac diva Lila Cassen in Quién te cantará (2018).

Nimri as Zulema Zahir in Vis a vis

In 2020, she returned as Zulema in the spin off Vis a vis: El Oasis, starring with Maggie Civantos. She played Alicia Sierra, a policewoman inspector in (Money Heist) La casa de papel. She voiced Kate Laswell in the 2019 video game Call of Duty: Modern Warfare.

She joined season 2 of religious horror series 30 Coins to portray paranormal hunter and video podcaster Haruka. In 2024, she featured in the hospital-set drama series Breathless, portraying a right-wing President of the Valencian Community set on dismantling the public healthcare system. She also portrayed Aurora Rodríguez in The Red Virgin.

== Filmography ==
=== Films ===
Year	Title	Role	Notes	Ref.
1995	Salto al vacío (Jump into the Void)	Alex		
1996	Pasajes (Passages)	Gabi		
1997	Abre los ojos (Open Your Eyes)	Nuria		
1997	A ciegas (Blinded)	Marrubi		
1998	Los amantes del círculo polar (Lovers of the Arctic Circle)	Ana	Character also performed by Kristel Díaz and Sara Valiente	
1998	9'8 m/s²	Ella		
2000	Asfalto	Lucía		
2001	Fausto 5.0	Julia		
2001	Before Night Falls	Fina Correa		
2001	Lucía y el sexo (Sex and Lucia)	Elena		
2002	Piedras (Stones)	Leire		
2003	Utopía (Utopia)	Ángela		
2004	A+ (Amas) (A+)	Dam		
2004	Agents secrets (Secret Agents)	Maria Menendez		
2005	El método (The Method)	Nieves		
2005	20 centímetros (20 Centimeters)	La Conejo		
2006	Trastorno (Dementia)	Natalia		
2006	Las vidas de Celia (Celia's Lives)	Celia		
2007	Mataharis	Eva		
2007	Oviedo Express	Bárbara		
2010	Todo lo que tú quieras (Anything You Want)	Marta		
2010	Route Irish	Marisol		
2010	Habitación en Roma (Room in Rome)	Edurne		
2011	Verbo	Inés		
2012	The Wine of Summer	Ana		
2013	10.000 noches en ninguna parte (10,000 Nights Nowhere)	Claudia		
2018	Quién te cantará	Lila Cassen		
2018	El árbol de la sangre (The Tree of Blood)	Macarena		
2024	La virgen roja (The Red Virgin)	Aurora Rodríguez		
2026	Lucidez † (Watch Your Dreams)			

=== Television ===
Year	Title	Role	Notes	Ref.
2015–2019	Vis a Vis (Locked Up)	Zulema Zahir	Main cast; 40 episodes	
2019–2021	La casa de papel (Money Heist)	Alicia Sierra	Main cast (season 3-5); 25 episodes	
2020	Vis a vis: El Oasis	Zulema Zahir	Lead role; 8 episodes	
2021–2022	Insiders	Host	14 episodes	
2022–23	Sagrada familia	Gloria Román / Julia Santos	Lead role; Seasons 1–2	
2023	30 monedas	Haruka	Season 2	
2023	Berlin	Alicia Sierra Montes	3 episodes	
2024	Respira (Breathless)	Patricia Segura		

=== Podcast ===
Year	Title	Role	Episodes
2020	Vis a vis: Cara B	Zulema Zahir	Voice role, 10 episodes

== Discography ==
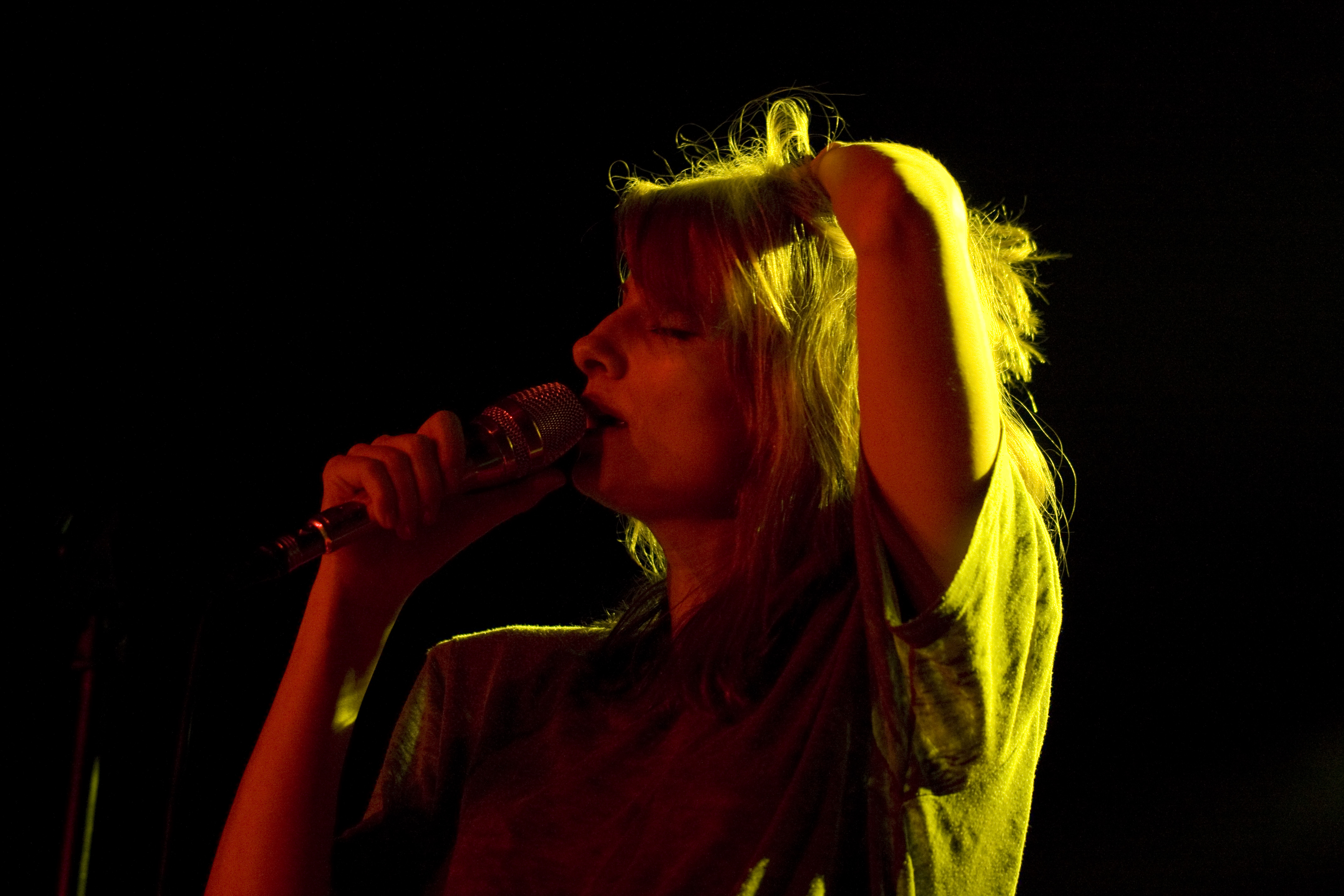
Nimri during a concert in Sala Bikini, Barcelona (2010)

=== Najwajean (with Carlos Jean) ===
- No Blood (1998) – No. 80
- Asfalto (2001) (soundtrack) – No. 175
- Guerreros (2002) (soundtrack) – No. 88
- Najwajean Selection (2002) (compilation album) – No. 108
- Till It Breaks (2008) – No. 20
- Bonzo (2015)

=== Solo albums ===
- Carefully (2001) – No. 76
- Mayday (2003) – No. 48
- Walkabout (2006) – No. 10 (50,000 copies sold; Gold)
- El ultimo primate (2010)
- Donde rugen los volcanes (2012)
- Rat Race (2014)
- Viene de Largo (2020)
- AMA (2021)

== Accolades ==
Year	Award	Category	Work	Result	Ref.
1998	45th Ondas Awards	Best Actress	Lovers of the Arctic Circle & Open Your Eyes	Won	
1999	13th Goya Awards	Best Actress	Lovers of the Arctic Circle	Nominated	
2002	16th Goya Awards	Best Supporting Actress	Sex and Lucia	Nominated	
2017	4th Feroz Awards	Best Main Actress in a Series	Locked Up	Nominated	
2019	6th Feroz Awards	Best Main Actress in a Series	Locked Up	Nominated	
2019	74th CEC Awards	Best Actress	Quién te cantará	Nominated	
2019	33rd Goya Awards	Best Actress	Quién te cantará	Nominated	
2019	69th Fotogramas de Plata	Best Film Actress	Quién te cantará	Nominated	
2019	69th Fotogramas de Plata	Best TV Actress	Locked Up	Won	
2019	6th Platino Awards	Best Actress in a Miniseries or TV Series	Locked Up	Nominated	
2021	8th Platino Awards	Best Supporting Actress in a Miniseries or TV Series	Money Heist	Nominated	
2022	72nd Fotogramas de Plata	Best TV Actress	Money Heist	Won	
2022	9th Platino Awards	Best Supporting Actress in a Miniseries or TV Series	Money Heist	Won	
2024	30th Forqué Awards	Best Actress in a Film	The Red Virgin	Nominated	
2025	80th CEC Medals	Best Actress	The Red Virgin	Nominated	
2025	12th Feroz Awards	Best Main Actress in a Film	The Red Virgin	Nominated	
2025	33rd Actors and Actresses Union Awards	Best Film Actress in a Leading Role	The Red Virgin	Nominated	
