= Gustavo Salmerón =

Spanish actor and writer

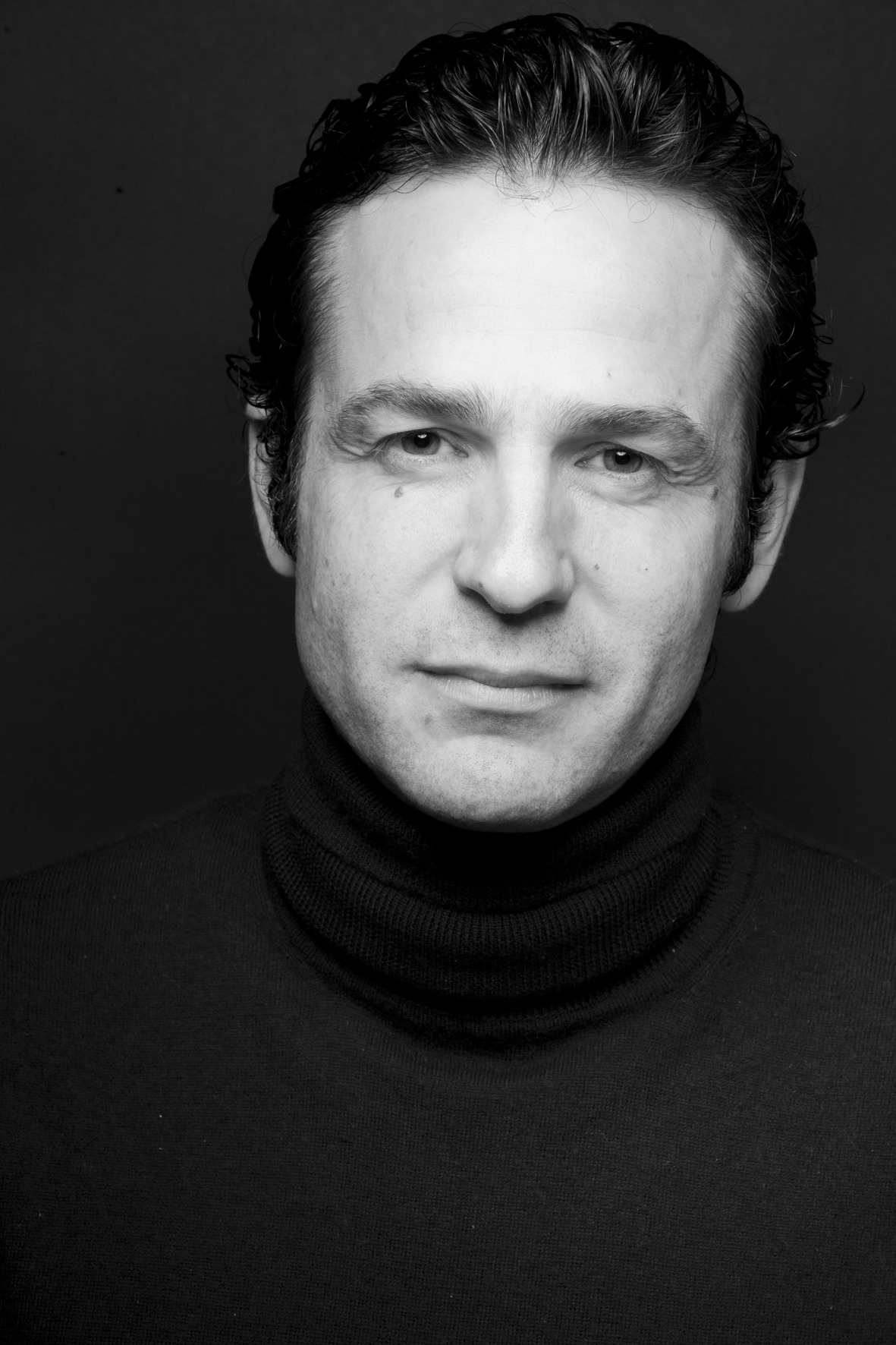
- Born: 27 August 1970 (age 55)
- Occupations: Actor and film director

Gustavo Salmerón García (born 27 August 1970 in Madrid, Spain as Gustavo García Salmerón), is a Spanish actor and writer, known for Lots of Kids, a Monkey and a Castle (2017), Mensaka (1998) and Asfalto (2000).

== Biography ==
From a very young age he became interested in cinema and began shooting homemade short films with his siblings and was attracted to the arts in general. At the age of eighteen, after finishing high school, he studied for a year in a town near Chicago, where he came into contact with the world of theater at Mount Vernon Drama School. However, his vocation as a painter was stronger and after presenting his drawings he was shortlisted for a scholarship at the prestigious Art Institute in Chicago. But he had returned to Spain for family reasons. Then he registered at the Faculty of Beautiful Arts of Madrid.

He regularly attended classes of Theater at the Nicolás Salmerón Cultural Center. They immediately offered him acting jobs in theater and television. Finally, the theater wins the game in the visual arts and Gustavo leaves the race to train as an actor.

He studied at different schools for more than fifteen years, including: Cristina Rota, Juan Carlos Corazza, Fernando Piernas and took courses with Augusto Fernándes, Marketta Krimbel in New York and the International Film School of San Antonio de Los Baños (Cuba), Mariano Barroso, Rafael Spregelburd, Phillippe Gaulier, etc.

After working in television, in different children's, youth and musical programs, telefilms and various theatrical productions, he arrives on the big screen with Julio Medem in La ardilla roja and since then participated in more than twenty films like Mensaka, Asphalt, More than love, frenzy, Everything is a lie or Out of the body, etc. He also shot two films in Cuba, Mambí and Operation Fangio. In New York he stars in The Other Shoe and in London Rain in the Shoes .

He has collaborated with many novice directors, as well as with established directors such as Luis García Berlanga, Blasco Ibáñez, Manuel Gutiérrez Aragón, in El rey del río or Mario Camus in La playa de los galgos.

In 2001 one feels attracted by the direction and rolls the short film Desaliñada with Candle Rock, Ernesto Alterio, Guillermo Toledo and Santiago Chavarri, by which it obtains the Goya award for the best short film in 2002 and numerous international prizes.

In 2017 he released a feature-length documentary about his family, Many Children, a Monkey and a Castle, which won the Goya Award for Best Documentary in 2018.

He is the partner of journalist and presenter Beatriz Montañez.

== Work ==
=== Cinema ===
- 1993 El camino de las estrellas - Dir. Chano Piñeyro.
- 1993 La ardilla roja - Dir. Julio Medem.
- 1994 Todo es mentira - Dir. Álvaro Fernández Armero.
- 1995 El dominio de los sentidos - Dir. Judith Colell.
- 1995 El rey del río - Dir. Manuel Gutiérrez Aragón.
- 1996 Blasco Ibáñez - Dir. Luis García Berlanga.
- 1996 Mambí - Dir. Teodoro & Santiago Ríos.
- 1996 Más que amor, frenesí - Dir. Miguel Bardem, Alfonso Albacete y David Menkes.
- 1996 Fotos - Dir. Elio Quiroga.
- 1997 Mensaka - Dir. Salvador García Ruiz.
- 1997 99.9 - Dir. Agustí Villaronga.
- 1997 Atómica - Dir. Alfonso Albacete y David Menkes.
- 1999 El arte de morir - Dir. Álvaro Fernández Armero.
- 1999 Asfalto - Dir. Daniel Calparsoro.
- 1999 Operación Fangio - Dir. Alberto Lecchi.
- 1999 Lluvia en los zapatos - Dir. María Ripoll.
- 2002 La playa de los galgos - Dir. Mario Camus.
- 2003 The other shoe - Dir. Guillermo Escalona i Joan Cuevas.
- 2004 Diez minutos (Short film) - Dir. Alberto Ruiz Rojo.
- 2004 Fuera del cuerpo - Dir. Vicente Peñarrocha.
- 2005 La explicación (Short film) - Dir. Curro Novallas.
- 2005 Reinas - Dir. Manuel Gómez Pereira.
- 2006 Remake - Dir. Roger Gual.
- 2007 Body armour - Dir. Ferry Lively.
- 2008 Carlitos y el campo de los sueños - Dir. Jesús del Cerro.
- 2009 Lala (Short Film) - Dir. Esteban Crespo.
- 2010 Bestezuelas - Dir. Carles Pastor.
- 2011 La senda - Dir. Miguel Ángel Toledo.
- 2011 Nadie tiene la culpa (Short film) - Dir. Esteban Crespo.
- 2014 V/H/S: Viral - Alfonso (segment "Parallel Monsters")
- 2017 ‘’Amar (2017 movie)’’ - Dir. Esteban Crespo.

=== Television ===
- That´s english - TVE
- De repente, los Gómez - Telecinco.
- Hay alguien ahí - Cuatro.

=== Theatre ===
- 1995 Esperando al zurdo - Dir. Cristina Rota.
- 1995 Lo bueno de las flores es que se marchitan pronto - Dir. Cristina Rota.
- 1996 Stop Madrid - Dir. E. Recabarren.
- 1997 Abocados - Dir. Maxi Rodríguez.
- 2006 Barcelona, mapa de sombras - Dir. Laia Ripoll - C.D.N.
- 2011 Los últimos días de Judas Iscariote - Dir. Adan Black.

=== As a director ===
- 2001 Desaliñada (Goya award for best film 2002).
- 2005 Rhythms of Oriental Dance (Musical).
- 2011 La matanza (Documentary feature film).
- 2017 Muchos hijos, un mono y un castillo (Goya for best documentary 2018).
