= Erich Hackl =

Austrian novelist and short story writer (born 1954)

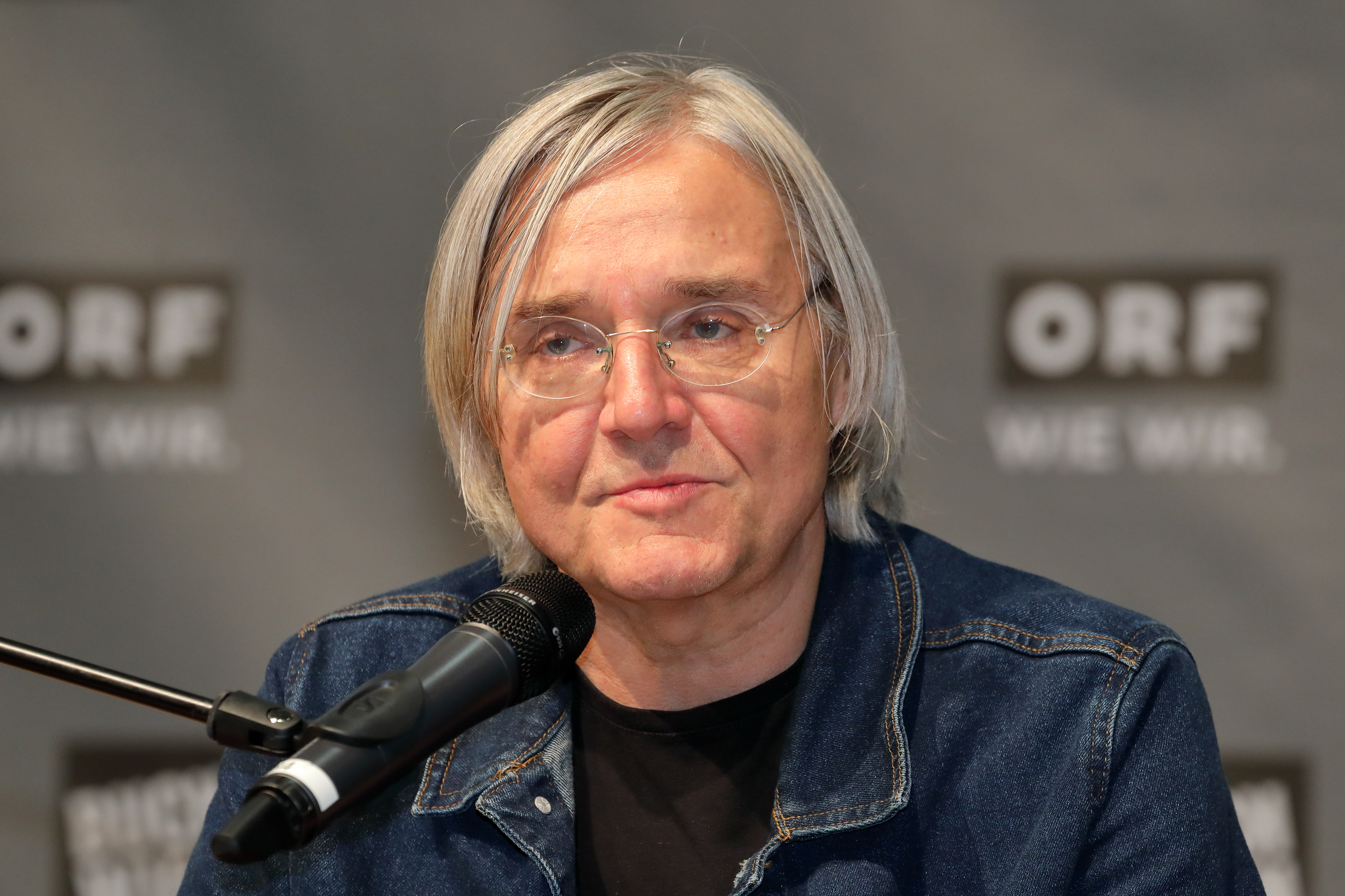
- Hackl in 2018
- Education: University of Salzburg
- Occupation: novelist

Erich Hackl (born 26 May 1954 in Steyr, Upper Austria) is an Austrian novelist and short story writer. His works have been translated into 25 languages though he is significantly better known in the German-speaking world. Many of his works, notably Sara und Simón, bear resemblance to Latin-American testimonial literature, and as such have been the focus of scholarly research by Latin Americanists.

A review in the UK's The Times Literary Supplement called The Wedding in Auschwitz "an exceptional book" because the author "has chosen not to conceal the documentary origins of his novel. Rather than producing a researched-based fictionalized account, honouring history and abiding by the literary conventions, he has given himself entirely to the subject ... a remarkable suppression of the authorial ego ... Hackl does not impose a novelist's order ... and yet the tension of the story never fails, interest never wanes. This is because Hackl understands that any ambiguity about detail is in contrast to an unshakeable sense of inevitability, and his narrative exploits what every reader must know: there will be no happy endings."

== Bibliography ==
The following bibliography includes the narrative works of Erich Hackl, but does not include translations or essay collections. Works translated into English are also translated below.

- Auroras Anlaß, 1987 (Aurora's Motive, 1989)
- Abschied von Sidonie, 1989 (Farewell Sidonia, 1991)
- König Wamba, 1991
- Sara und Simón, 1995
- In fester Umarmung, 1996
- Entwurf einer Liebe auf den ersten Blick, 1999 (Narratives of Loving Resistance, 2006)
- Der Träumer Krivanek, 2000
- Die Hochzeit von Auschwitz, 2002 (The Wedding in Auschwitz, 2006)
- Anprobieren eines Vaters, 2004
- Als ob ein Engel, 2007 (Argentina's Angel, 2014)
- Familie Salzmann, 2010
- Dieses Buch gehört meiner Mutter, 2013
- Drei tränenlose Geschichten, 2014 (Three tearless histories, 2017)
- Am Seil, 2018 (On the rope, 2020)
- Im Leben mehr Glück, 2019
- Rudolf Schönwald: Die Welt war ein Irrenhaus. Meine Lebensgeschichte, nacherzählt von Erich Hackl, 2022
