= Eduardo de Guzmán =

Spanish journalist and writer

Eduardo de Guzmán Espinosa (19 June 1908 in Villada – 25 July 1991 in Madrid) was a Spanish journalist and writer, popular during the Second Spanish Republic. He was known for his press reports and journalism during the Spanish Civil War following the anarcho-syndicalist ideology. He was arrested at the end of the civil war. In January 1940, he was sentenced to death by a military court, together with the poet Miguel Hernández, but his sentence was commuted to a prison term in May 1941, and he was granted conditional freedom in 1943.
