= 17th Gaudí Awards =

2025 Catalan film awards ceremony

- Date: 18 January 2025
- Site: Auditori Fòrum CCIB, Barcelona, Catalonia, Spain
- Hosted by: Marc Clotet; Paula Malia; Pep Ambròs; Marta Torné

Highlights
- Best Film: The 47
- Best Direction: Isaki Lacuesta, Pol Rodríguez; Saturn Return
- Best Actor: Eduard Fernández; The 47
- Best Actress: Emma Vilarasau; A House on Fire
- Most awards: The 47 (7)
- Most nominations: The 47 (18)

The 17th Gaudí Awards ceremony, presented by the Catalan Film Academy, took place on 18 January 2025 at the Auditori Fòrum CCIB in Barcelona. The 47 won the Best Film award.

== Background ==
In November 2024, producer and distributor Paco Poch was announced as the recipient of the Honorary Gaudí. The nominations were read by actors Bruna Cusí and David Verdaguer from the auditorium of La Pedrera on 5 December 2024. The category for Best Television Movie was not presented. Also in December 2024, Marc Clotet and Paula Malia were announced as the gala hosts. In the middle of the ceremony, Pep Ambròs took over Malia and Clotet as the gala host, and then transferred responsibility to Marta Torné.

Historical drama The 47, directed by Marcel Barrena, led the nominations with a record-breaking eighteen, followed by A House on Fire by Dani de la Orden and They Will Be Dust by Carlos Marques-Marcet, with fourteen nods each.

The 47 also received the most awards of the ceremony with seven, including Best Film. Best Non-Catalan Language Film winner They Will Be Dust followed with four victories.

== Winners and nominees ==
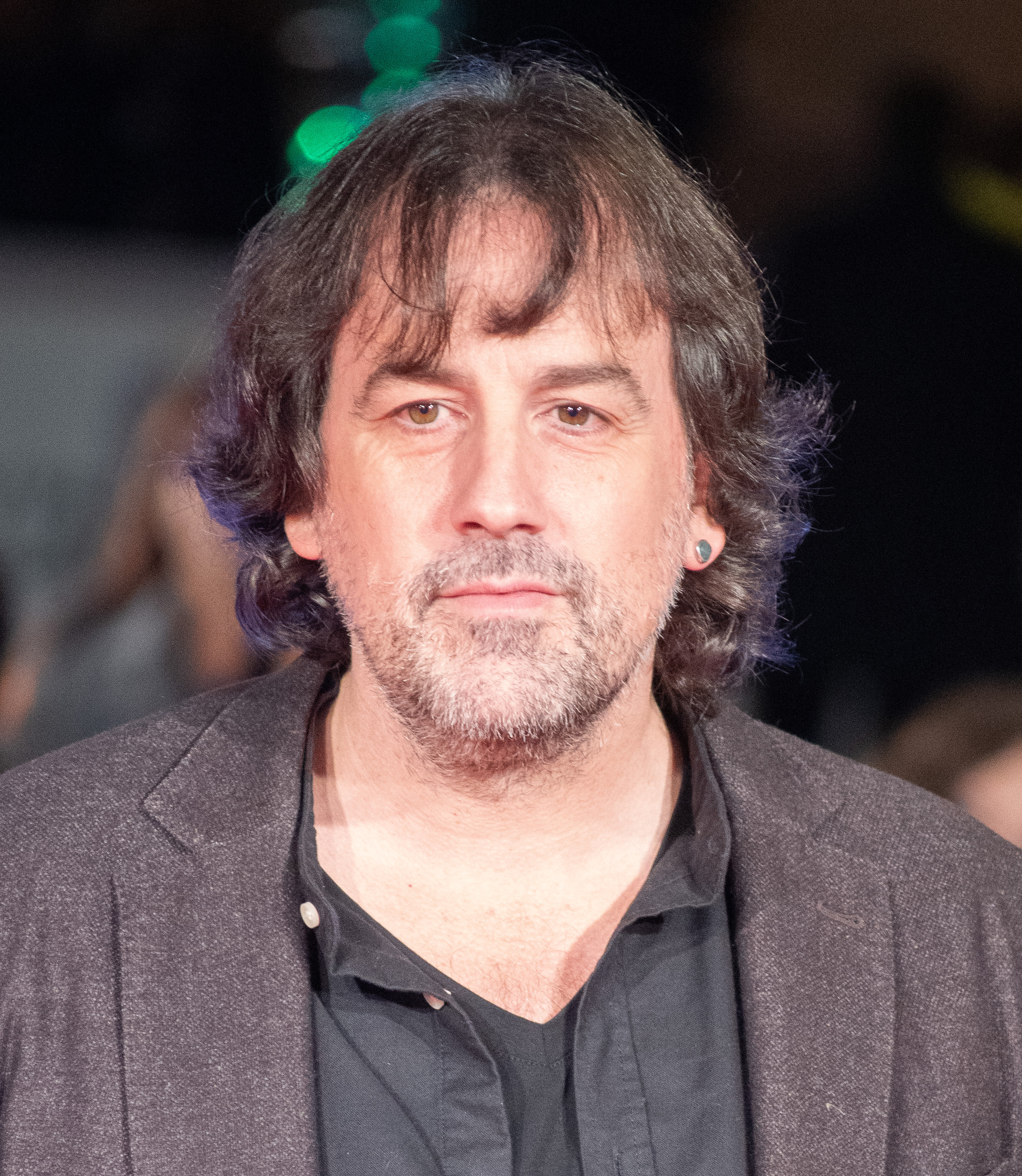
Isaki Lacuesta, Best Director co-winner.

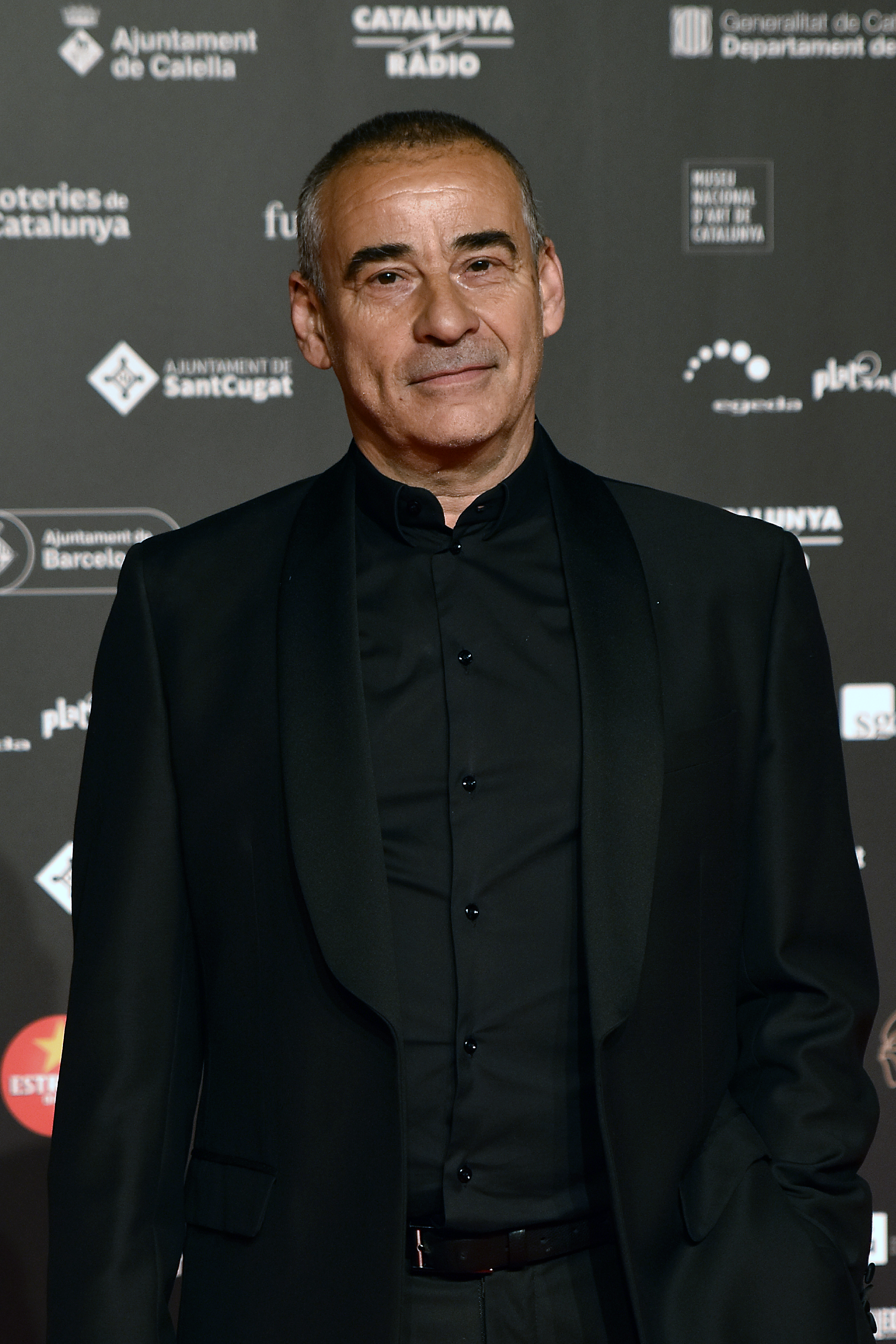
Eduard Fernández, Best Actor winner.

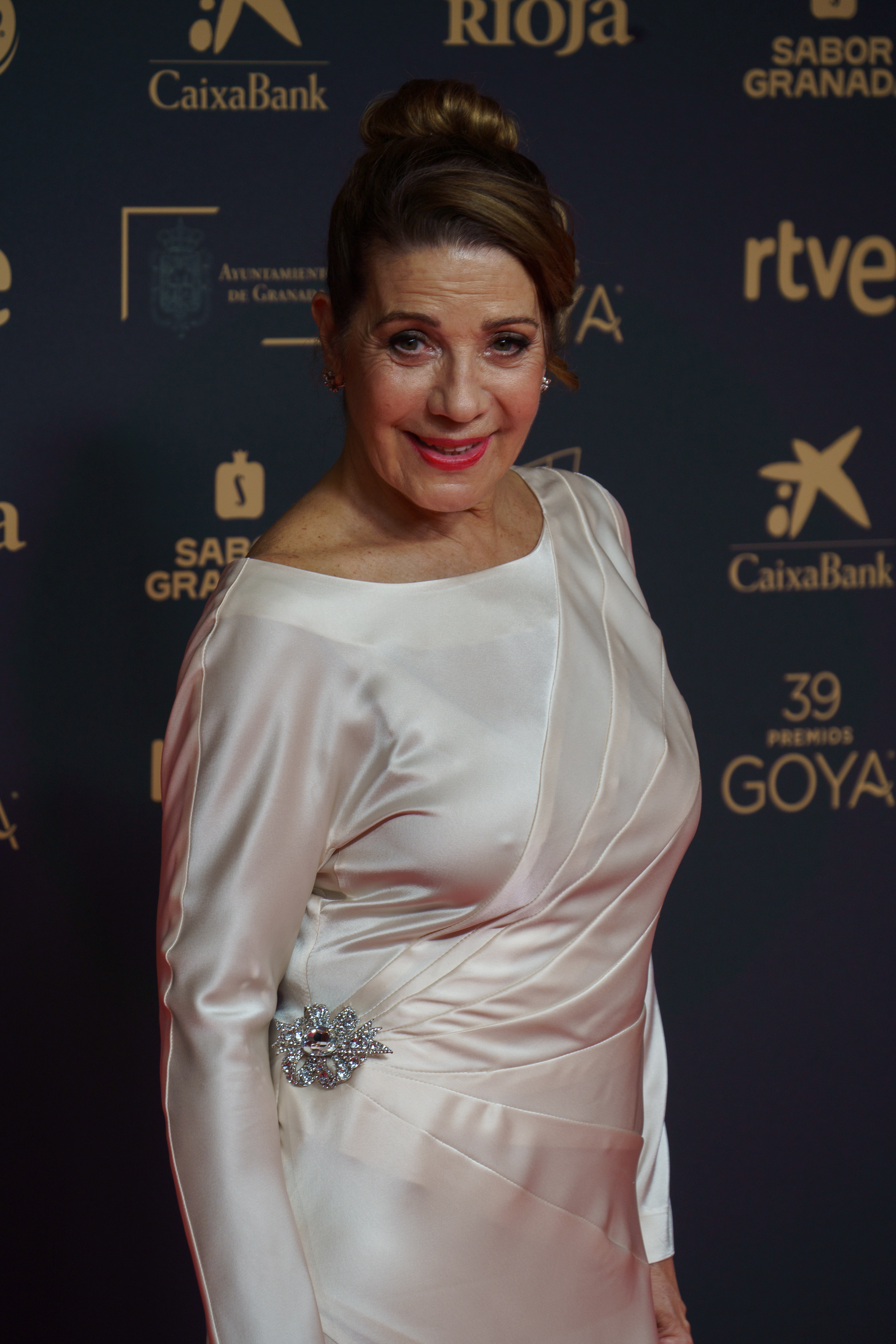
Emma Vilarasau, Best Actress winner.

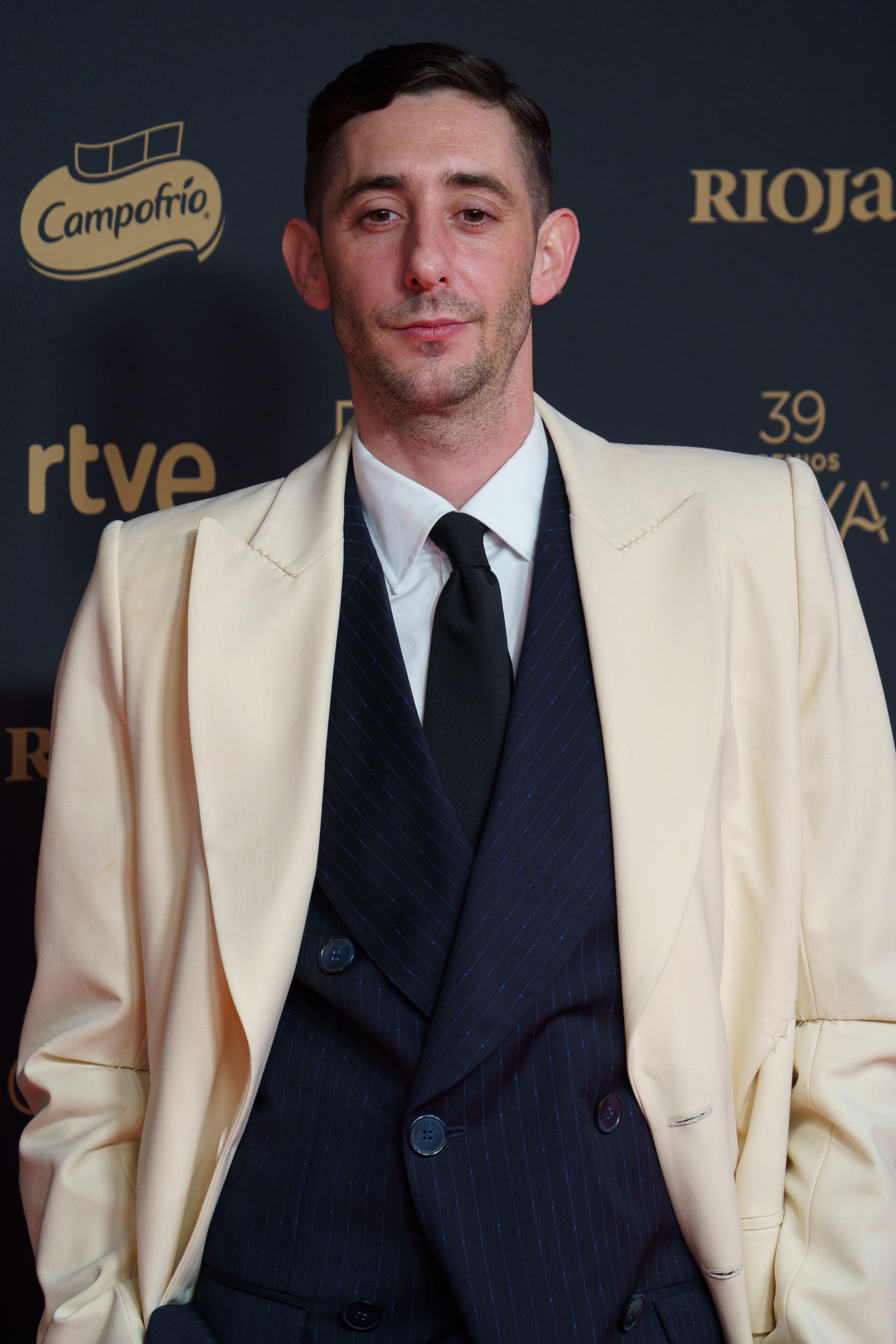
Enric Auquer, Best Supporting Actor winner.

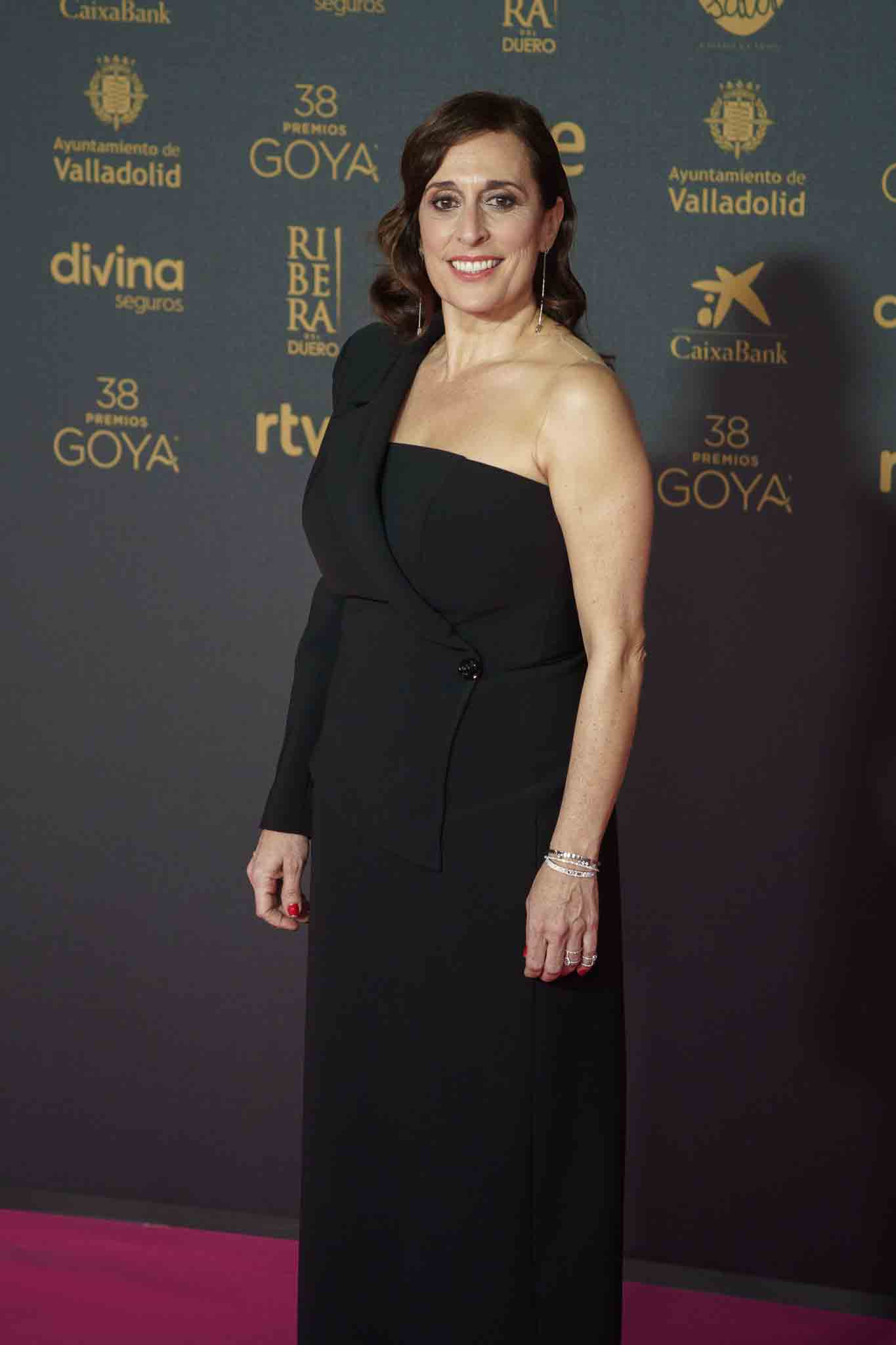
Clara Segura, Best Supporting Actress winner.

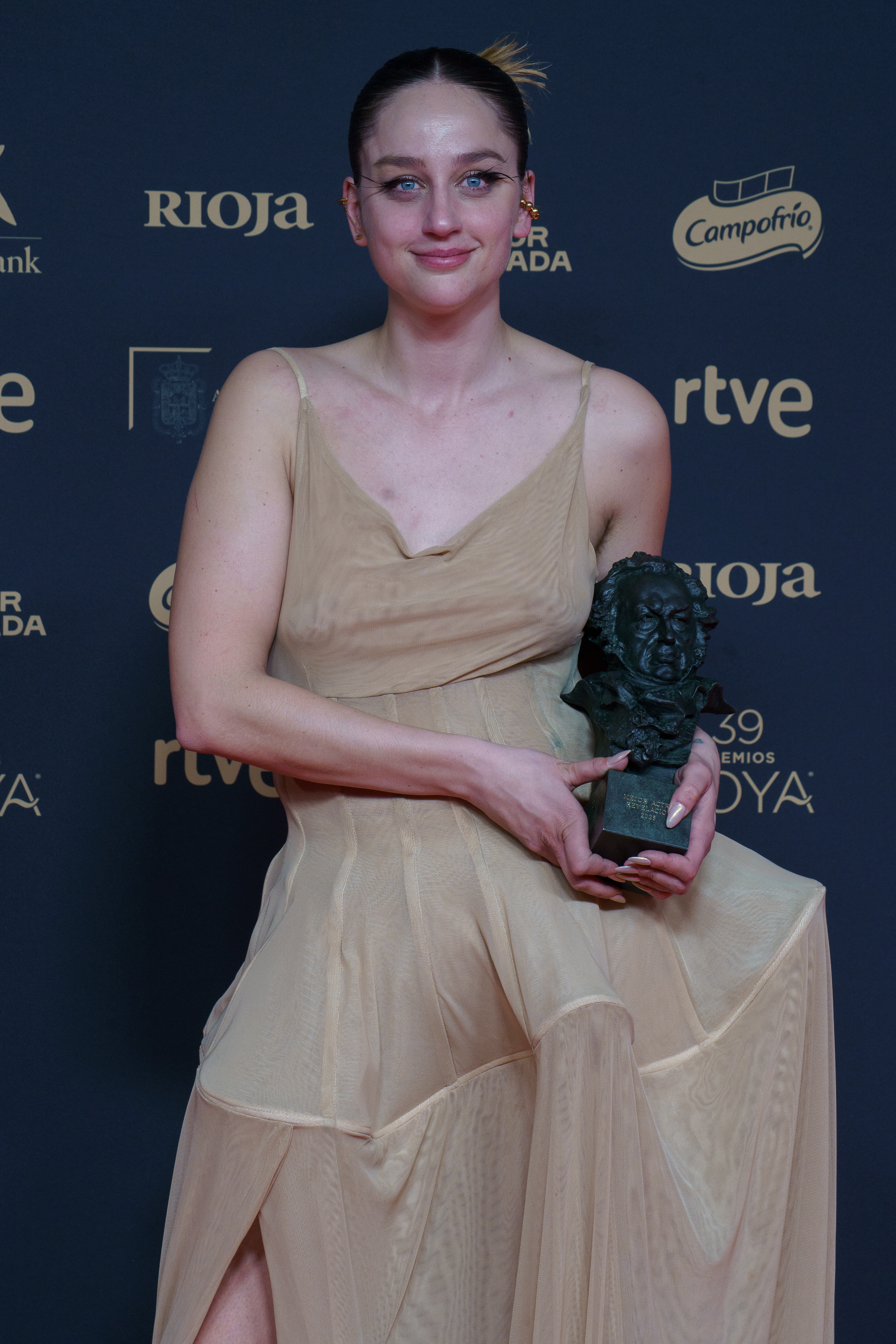
Laura Weissmahr, Best New Performance winner.

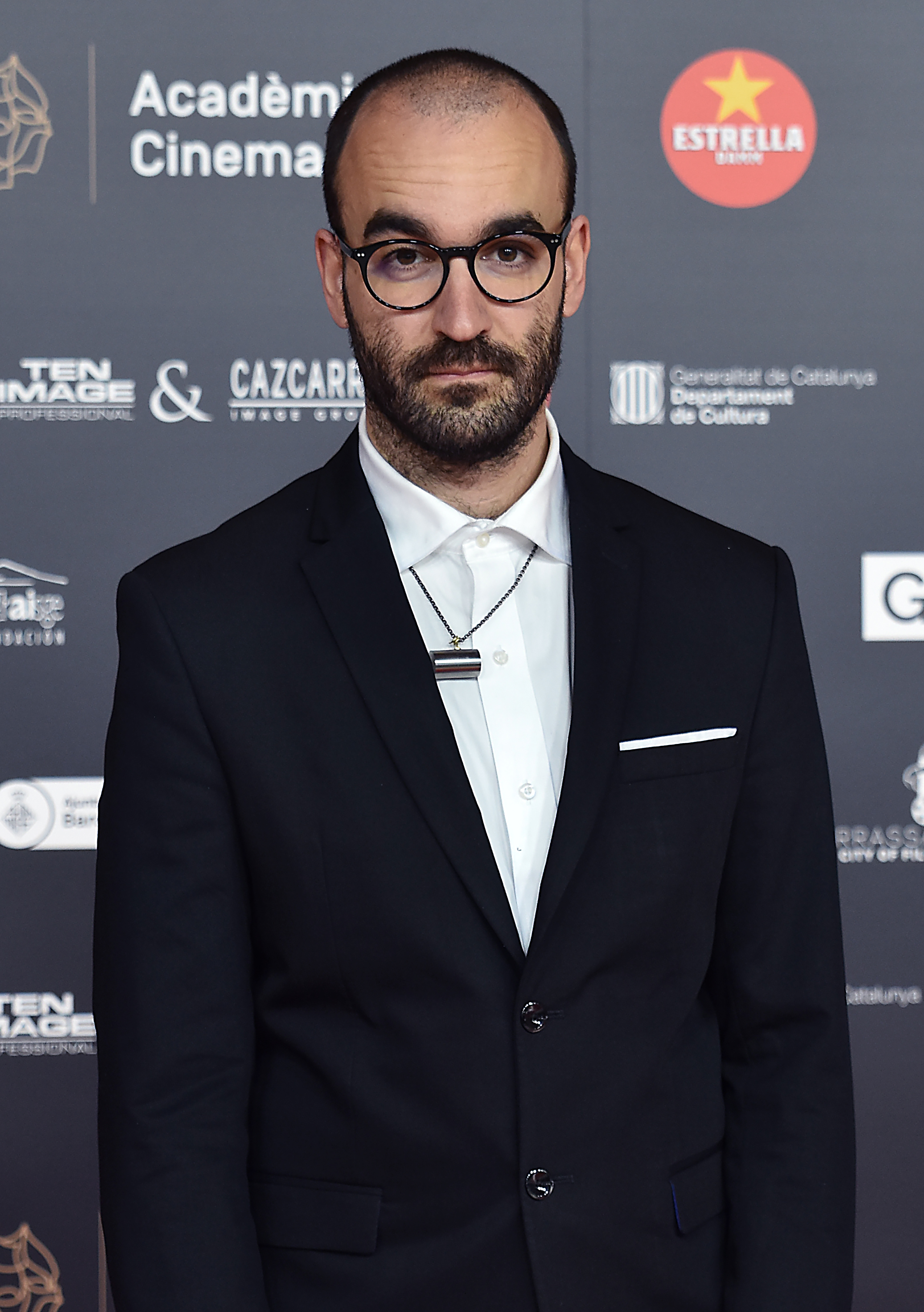
Eduard Sola, Best Original Screenplay winner.

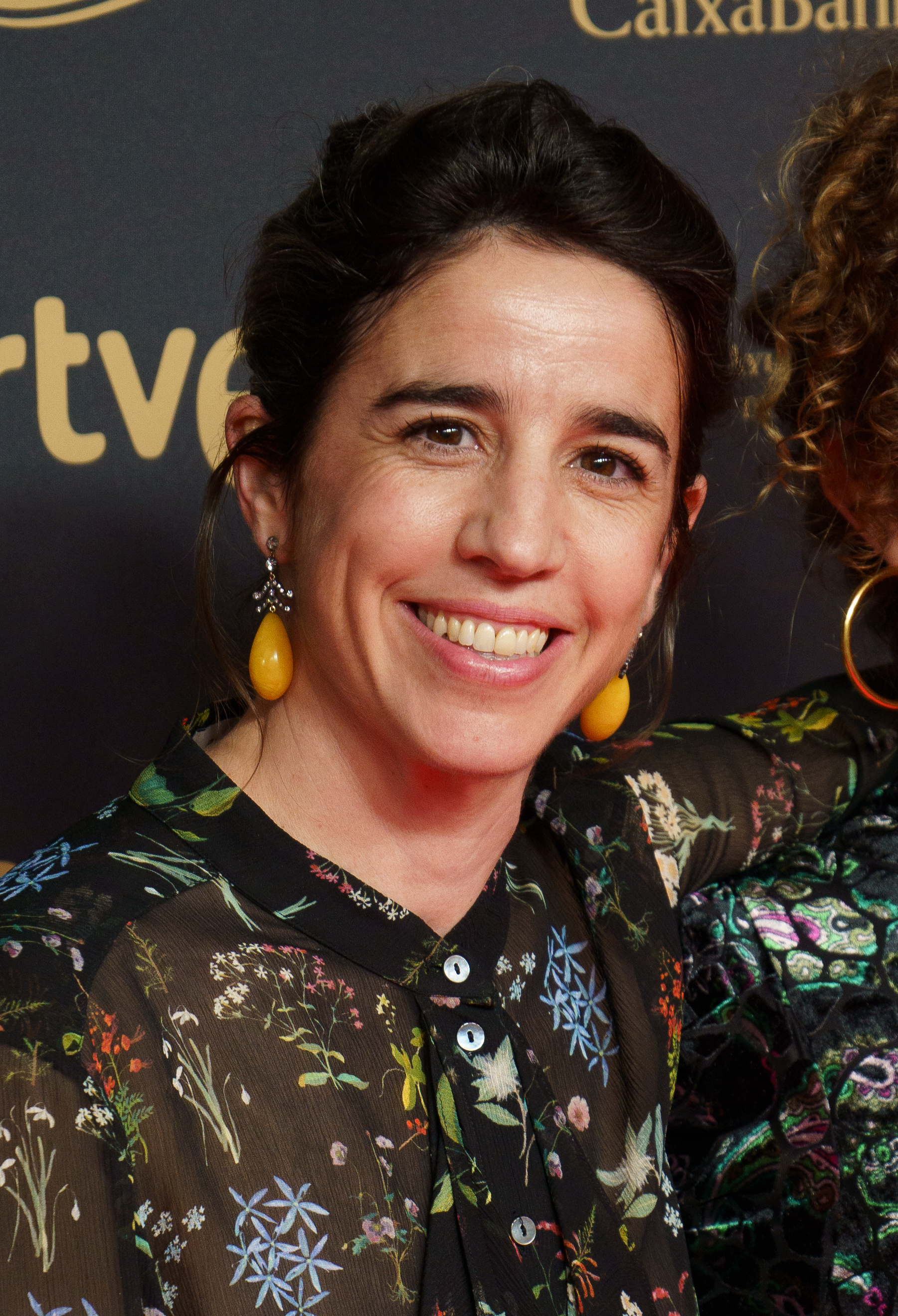
Mar Coll, Best Adapted Screenplay co-winner.

The winners and nominees are listed as follows:

Best Film: The 47; produced by Laura Fernández Espeso, Javier Méndez; A House on Fire; produced by Toni Carrizosa, Alberto Aranda, Ana Eiras, Kike Maíllo, Bernat Saumell, Dani de la Orden, Jaime Ortiz de Artiñano, Oriol Sala-Patau, Conxa Orea; Salve Maria; produced by Sergi Casamitjana, María Zamora; Mamifera; produced by Miriam Porté Solano, Carla Sospedra Salvadó	Best Non-Catalan Language Film: They Will Be Dust; produced by Tono Folguera, Ariadna Dot, Giovanni Pompili, David Epiney, Eugenia Mumenthaler; Little Loves; produced by Sandra Tapia, Ignasi Estapé, Ibon Cormenzana, Ángel Durández, Cleber Beretta Custodio, Francisco Celma; Glimmers; produced by Fernando Bovaira, Valérie Delpierre, Simón de Santiago; Saturn Return; produced by Cristóbal García, Edmon Roch, Marta Velasco, Alex Lafuente, Roberto Butragueño
Best Director: Isaki Lacuesta, Pol Rodríguez — Saturn Return; Dani de la Orden — A House on Fire; Marcel Barrena — The 47; Carlos Marques-Marcet — They Will Be Dust	Best New Director: Celia Giraldo — A Commonplace; Clara Serrano Llorens, Gerard Simó Gimeno — L'edat imminent; Miguel Faus — The Quiet Maid; Mònica Cambra, Ariadna Fortuny — A Bright Sun
Best Original Screenplay: Eduard Sola — A House on Fire; Carlos Marques-Marcet, Clara Roquet, Coral Cruz — They Will Be Dust; Isaki Lacuesta, Fernando Navarro — Saturn Return; Marcel Barrena, Alberto Marini — The 47	Best Adapted Screenplay: Mar Coll, Valentina Viso — Salve Maria; based on the novel Amek ez dute by Katixa Agirre; Ibai Abad, Elisenda Gorgues — Gold Lust; based on the novel L'escanyapobres by Narcís Oller; Miguel Faus — The Quiet Maid; based on the short film by Miguel Faus; Pilar Palomero — Glimmers; based on the novel Bihotz handiegia by Eider Rodriguez
Best Actress: Emma Vilarasau — A House on Fire; Ángela Molina — They Will Be Dust; Maria Rodríguez Soto — Mamifera; Patricia López Arnaiz — Glimmers	Best Actor: Eduard Fernández — The 47; Alberto San Juan — A House on Fire; Alfredo Castro — They Will Be Dust; Enric Auquer — Mamifera
Best Supporting Actress: Clara Segura — The 47; Adriana Ozores — Little Loves; Betsy Túrnez — The 47; Maria Rodríguez Soto — A House on Fire	Best Supporting Actor: Enric Auquer — A House on Fire; David Verdaguer — The 47; Carlos Cuevas — The 47; Antonio de la Torre — Glimmers; Oriol Pla — Salve Maria
Best New Performance: Laura Weissmahr — Salve Maria; Aimar Vega — Little Loves; Mireia Vilapuig — Gold Lust; Zoe Bonafonte — The 47	Best Original Score: Maria Arnal — They Will Be Dust; Arnau Bataller — The 47; Maria Chiara Casà — A House on Fire; Zeltia Montes — Salve Maria
Best Production Supervision: Carlos Apolinario — The 47; Carlos Amoedo — Saturn Return; Laia Gómez Roig — A House on Fire; Mayca Sanz, Andrés Mellinas — They Will Be Dust	Best Documentary Film: Diari de la meva sextorsió; produced by Patricia Franquesa, Mireia Graell Vivancos; La fugida; produced by Sílvia Pairó Vila, Jordi Vilar Segura, Adriano Móran, Josep Morell Feixas, Guillem Sánchez Marín, Marc M.Sarrado; La Joia: Bad Gyal; produced by Àlex Julià, Ivó Vinuesa Rocher, Alba Blasi, Sergi Cameron, David Camarero Porcar; Sau: la memòria submergida; produced by Agustí Danés, Beth Codina, Jordi Sacristan
Best Short Film: El príncep; produced by Carlota Coloma, Adrià Lahuerta, Marta Cruañas, Xavi Vara, Alex Sardà; Cura Sana; produced by Sergi Casamitjana, Lita Roig, Lucía García Romero; Dol i fa sol; produced by Xesc Cabot, Pep Garrido, Maria Besora; Els buits; produced by Carlotta Schiavon, Laura Rubirola, Ian de la Rosa, Marina Freixa Roca, Sofia Esteve, Isa Luengo	Best Animated Film: Black Butterflies; produced by Edmon Roch, David Baute, Marc Sabé, César Zelada, Muntsa Tarrés, Xavier Romero; Buffalo Kids; produced by Jordi Gasull, Jaime Ortiz de Artiñano, Toni Novella, Marc Sabé, Pedro Solís, Ignacio Salazar-Simpson, Ricardo Marco Budé, Francisco Celma Sánchez, Cleber Beretta Custodio; Dàlia i el llibre vermell; produced by Ángeles Hernández, David Matamoros, Álvaro Urtizberea, David Bisbano, Guido Rud, Patricio Rabufetti, Fernanda Senatori, Lisette Freire Pérez, Franklin Ventura, Carlos Rivas, Ricardo Montes; Rock Bottom; produced by Alba Sotorra Clua, Miguel Molina, Adán Aliaga, Robert Jaszczurowski, Lukasz Kacprowicz, Marcin Wasilewski, Anna Mroczek, Wojciech Leszczy?ski, Dani Bagur, Kiko Domínguez
Best European Film: Anatomy of a Fall; The Zone of Interest; Fallen Leaves; Poor Things	Best Art Direction: Laia Ateca — They Will Be Dust; Irene Montcada — Holy Mother; Marta Bazaco — The 47; Núria Guàrdia Allué — A House on Fire
Best Cinematography: Takuro Takeuchi — Saturn Return; Isaac Vila — The 47; Gabriel Sandru — They Will Be Dust; Nilo Zimmerman — Salve Maria	Best Editing: Chiara Dainese — They Will Be Dust; Alberto Gutiérrez — A House on Fire; Aina Calleja — Salve Maria; Nacho Ruiz Capillas — The 47
Best Costume Design: Olga Rodal, Irantzu Ortiz — The 47; Catherine Marchand, Pau Aulí — Holy Mother; Lourdes Fuentes — Saturn Return; Pau Aulí — They Will Be Dust	Best Sound: Diana Sagrista, Alejandro Castillo, Eva Valiño, Antonin Dalmasso — Saturn Return; Elena Coderch, Sarah Romero, Oriol Tarragó, Marc Bech — A House on Fire; Eva Valiño, Fabiola Ordoyo, Yasmina Praderas — The 47; Xavier Lavorel, Maya Baur, Kathleen Moser, Denis Séchaud — They Will Be Dust
Best Visual Effects: Laura Canals, Iván López Hernández — The 47; Diana Cuyàs — They Will Be Dust; Lluís Rivera Jove, Xavi Molas, Laura Pedro — A House on Fire; María Magnet, Marion Delgado, Iñaki Gil "Ketxu", Sebastien Launay — Saturn Return	Best Makeup and Hairstyles: Karol Tornaria — The 47; Anna Álvarez de Sardi, Maribel Bernales — A House on Fire; Natalia Albert, Marta Xipell — They Will Be Dust; Yolanda Piña, Inés Díaz — Saturn Return

=== Films with multiple nominations and awards ===
Films with multiple nominations
Nominations	Film
18	The 47
14	A House on Fire
14	They Will Be Dust
9	Saturn Return
7	Salve Maria
4	Glimmers
3	Mamifera
3	Little Loves
2	Gold Lust
2	Holy Mother
2	The Quiet Maid

Films with multiple awards
Awards	Film
7	The 47
4	They Will Be Dust
3	A House on Fire
3	Saturn Return
2	Salve Maria

=== Honorary Gaudí ===
- Paco Poch

=== Audience Award ===
- The 47
