= 69th Valladolid International Film Festival =

2024 film festival

- Official poster of the 69th Seminci
- Opening film: They Will Be Dust
- Closing film: Sing Sing
- Location: Valladolid, Castile and León, Spain
- Awards: Golden Spike: Misericordia
- Directors: José Luis Cienfuegos
- Festival date: 18–26 October 2024

Valladolid International Film Festival
- 70th 68th

The 69th Valladolid International Film Festival (Seminci) took place from 18 to 26 October 2024, in Valladolid, Spain. They Will Be Dust opened the festival.

== Background ==
In June 2024, the festival announced the update of its branding image since 1984, the iconic lips by Leonese painter Manuel Sierra, with a revamped version developed by PobrelaVaca Studio's Félix Rodríguez and Ana María Hernández, which was included in the festival's poster for the 69th edition. On 21 August 2024, Carlos Marques-Marcet's They Will Be Dust was announced as the festival's opening picture. Later in August, the festival announced an early tranche of Spanish-produced and co-produced films to be part of different festivals sections.

On 15 October 2024, director Sofia Exarchou, actress Aida Folch, film critic Devika Girish, director Luis López Carrasco, and producer Ingmar Frost were announced as the members of the main competition jury.

== Official Section Feature Films ==
=== Competition ===
The following films were selected to compete for the Golden Spike:

English title	Original title	Director(s)	Production countrie(s)
Armand		Halfdan Ullmann Tøndel	Norway; Netherlands; Sweden; Germany
Becoming Ana	La mitad de Ana	Marta Nieto	Spain
Black Dog	狗阵	Guan Hu	China
The Brutalist		Brady Corbet	United Kingdom; United States
Bob Trevino Likes It		Tracie Laymon	United States
Christmas Eve in Miller's Point		Tyler Taormina	United States
La cocina		Alonso Ruizpalacios	Mexico; United States
Close to the Sultan	En la alcoba del sultán	Javier Rebollo	Spain; France
Grand Tour		Miguel Gomes	Portugal; Italy; France
Harvest		Athina Rachel Tsangari	United Kingdom; Germany; Greece; France; United States
Misericordia		Alain Guiraudie	France; Spain; Portugal
The Most Precious of Cargoes	La Plus Précieuse des marchandises	Michel Hazanavicius	France; Belgium
My Favourite Cake	کیک محبوب من	Maryam Moqadam, Behtash Sanaeeha	Iran; France; Sweden; Germany
The Party's Over	Fin de fiesta	Elena Manrique	Spain; Belgium
Salve Maria	Salve María	Mar Coll	Spain
September Says		Ariane Labed	France; Greece; Ireland; Germany; United Kingdom
Sex		Dag Johan Haugerud	Norway
Stranger Eyes	默視錄	Yeo Siew Hua	Singapore; Taiwan; France; United States
Suspended Time	Hors du temps	Olivier Assayas	France
They Will Be Dust	Polvo serán	Carlos Marques-Marcet	Spain; Switzerland; Italy
Three Kilometres to the End of the World	Trei kilometri până la capătul lumii	Emanuel Pârvu	Romania
Vermiglio		Maura Delpero	Italy; France; Belgium
Wild Diamond	Diamant brut	Agathe Riedinger	France

=== Out of competition ===
English title	Original title	Director(s)	Production countrie(s)
Rita		Paz Vega	Spain
Sing Sing		Greg Kwedar	United States
RTVE Galas
Verano en diciembre		Carolina África	Spain

== Special Screenings ==
The festival's special screenings include:

English title	Original title	Director(s)	Production countrie(s)
The New Years (TV series)	Los años nuevos	Sandra Romero, David Martín de los Santos, Rodrigo Sorogoyen	Spain
The Wailing	El llanto	Pedro Martín-Calero	Spain; France; Argentina
Always+Positivo	Siempre+Positivo	Nacho Solana	Spain
Blackmail		Alfred Hitchcock	United Kingdom
Colita sin filtros		Hortensia Vélez, Elisabeth Anglarill	Spain
Domar la luz		Oihan	Spain
The Flamenco Guitar of Yerai Cortés	La guitarra flamenca de Yerai Cortés	Antón Álvarez	Spain
State of Silence	Estado de Silencio	Santiago Maza	Mexico

== Meeting Point (Punto de Encuentro) ==
The following films were selected for the 'Meeting Point' section:

English title	Original title	Director(s)	Production countrie(s)
Blue Sun Palace		Constance Tsang	United States
Brief History of a Family	家庭简史	Lin Jianjie	China; France; Denmark; Qatar
Caught by the Tides	风流一代	Jia Zhangke	China
Edge of Night	Gecenin Kıyısı	Türker Süer	Germany; Turkey
Eephus		Carson Lund	United States; France
The Fable		Raam Reddy	India; United States
Familiar Touch		Sarah Friedland	United States
Ghost Trail	Les Fantômes	Jonathan Millet	France; Germany; Belgium
In His Own Image	À son image	Thierry de Peretti	France
Holy Cow	Vingt dieux	Louise Courvoisier	France
Ivo		Eva Trobisch	Germany
Moon	Mond	Kurdwin Ayub	Austria
To Our Friends	A nuestros amigos	Adrián Orr Serrano	Spain; Portugal
A Real Pain		Jesse Eisenberg	United States; Poland
Scorched Earth	Verbrannte Erde	Thomas Arslan	Germany
Toxic	Akiplėša	Saulė Bliuvaitė	Lithuania
Universal Language	Une langue universelle	Matthew Rankin	Canada
Việt and Nam		Minh Quý Trương	Vietnam; Philippines; Singapore; France; Netherlands; Italy; Germany; United States

== Alchemies (Alquimias) ==
The following films were selected for the Alquimias section:

English title	Original title	Director(s)	Production countrie(s)
The Adamant Girl	Kottukkaali	PS Vinothraj	India
Agora		Ala Eddine Slim	Tunisia; France; Saudi Arabia; Qatar
Bluish		Lilith Kraxner, Milena Czernovsky	Austria
Cyborg Generation		Miguel Morillo Vega	Spain
The Great Yawn of History	Khamyazeye bozorg	Iran	
The Human Hibernation		Anna Cornudella Castro	Spain
Invention		Courtney Stephens	United States
The Rim	La parra	Alberto Gracia	Spain
An Unfinished Film	一部未完成的电影	Lou Ye	Singapore; Germany

== Time of History (Tiempo de historia) ==
English title	Original title	Director(s)	Production countrie(s)
Resistance Reels	Caja de resistencia	Alejandro Alvarado, Concha Barquero, Alejandro Alvarado Jódar, Concha Barquero Artés	Spain; Portugal
The Marseillaise of the Drunkards	La marsellesa de los borrachos	Pablo Gil Rituerto	Spain; France; Italy
My Brother Ali	Mi hermano Ali	Paula Palacios	Spain; Portugal
Turismo de guerra		Kikol Grau	Spain
Waldo (out of competition)		Carlos Arnaiz Escalpés, Alberto Ortega Ahumada	Spain
Hija del volcán (out of competition)		Jenifer de la Rosa Martín	Spain; Mexico

== Memory & Utopia (Memoria y Utopía) ==
The following films were selected for the 'Memory & Utopia' section:

English title	Original title	Director(s)	Production countrie(s)
Portabella Constellation	Constel·lació Portabella	Claudio Zulian	Spain

== International Short Film Official Section ==
English title	Original title	Director(s)	Production countrie(s)
400 Cassettes		Thelyia Petraki	Greece; Germany
Bad For a Moment		Daniel Soares	Portugal
Baldilocks		Marthe Peters	Belgium
El cambio de rueda		Begoña Arostegui	Spain
El cuento de una noche de verano		María Herrera	Spain
Immaculata		Kim Lêa Sakkal	Germany; France
Le Loup		Theodore Ushev	Canada
Lluna de Sal		Mariona Martínez	Spain
Marion		Joe Weiland, Finn Constantine	United Kingdom; France
My Senses Are All I Have to Offer		Isadora Neves Marques	Portugal
Nens		Anna Martí Domingo	Spain
O		Rúnar Rúnarsson	Iceland; Sweden
On the Way		Samir Karahoda	Kosovo
Pacific Vein		Ulu Braun	Germany
Percebes		Alexandra Ramires, Laura Gonçalves	Portugal; France
Punter		Jason Adam Maselle	South Africa; United States
Vegan Mayo		Luca Tóth	Hungary
Vox Humana		Don Josephus Raphael Eblahan	Philippines; United States; Singapur
White Cloud		Emmanuel Van der Auwera	Belgium

== Spanish Short Films Official Section ==
English title	Original title	Director(s)	Production countrie(s)
At Night We Walk Alone		Rafa Alberola	Spain
Berta		Lucía Forner Segarra	Spain
Futuro		Amanda Cots, Ángel Suárez Ávila	Spain; Cuba
Made of sugar		Clàudia Cedó	Spain
Mater Benefacta		Marc Riba, Anna Solanas	Spain
The Other		Eduard Fernández	Spain
The Prince		Àlex Sardà	Spain
They Send Word		Mariano Schoendorff	Spain
Una cabeza en la pared		Manuel Manrique	Spain
You were Paris		Claudia Barral Magaz	Spain; France

== Castilla y León ==
The Castilla y León feature films and Castilla y León short films programmes include the following films:

English title	Original title	Director(s)	Production countrie(s)
Castilla y León feature films
Devil Dog Road	Lo carga el diablo	Guillermo Polo	Spain
Pastoris		Pablo Moreno	Spain
Castilla y León short films
Arenillas		Marta Martín	Spain
DxTequiero		Sergio López, Mariola Aygües, Macarena Peri	Spain
In Between	Lo que paso entre medias (de estudiar cine)	Dacio de las Heras	Spain
Only the Dead Remain	Sólo los muertos se quedan	Alejandro Renedo	Spain
Panorama		Margo García	Spain
Seeds from Kivu	Semillas de Kivu	Néstor López, Carlos Valle	Spain

== Awards ==
A list of awards is listed as follows:

Official Section — Feature Films

- Golden Spike: Misericordia
- Silver Spike: Stranger Eyes & They Will Be Dust
- 'Ribera del Duero' Award for Best Direction: Guan Hu (Black Dog)
- Best Actress: Laura Weissmahr (Salve Maria); special mention for Ángela Molina (The Will Be Dust)
- Best Actor: Jan Gunnar Roise & Thorbjørn Harr (Sex); special mention for Alfredo Castro (They Will Be Dust)
- Best Cinematography: Weizhe Gao (Black Dog)
- 'Miguel Delibes' Award for Best Screenplay: Alain Guiraudie (Misericordia)
- 'José Salcedo' Award for Best Editing: Telmo Churro & Pedro Filipe Marques (Grand Tour)

Other awards

- 'Meeting Point' award: Holy Cow
- Fundos Special Award: Familiar Touch
- 'Alchemies' Grand Prize: The Rim; special mention for Bluish
- 'Time of History' Grand Prize: Youth (Hard Times)
- 'Time of History' Special Award: Henry Fonda for President; special mention for Savanna and the Mountains
- 'Pilar Miró' Award for Best Spanish Direction: Elena Manrique (The Party's Over)
- DOC. España Award: Resistance Reels
- Young Seminci Award: Hija del volcán
- Young Jury — Official Section Prize: Armand
- Golden Spike for Best Short Film: Baldilocks
- Silver Spike for Best Short Film: Punter & Lluna de sal
- Rainbow Spike: Three Kilometres to the End of the World
- FIPRESCI Award: Christmas Eve in Miller's Point
- Audience Award (Official Section — Feature Films): Bob Trevino Likes It
- Audience Award (Meeting Point): Holy Cow
