= Marina Guerola =

Spanish actress (born 1997)

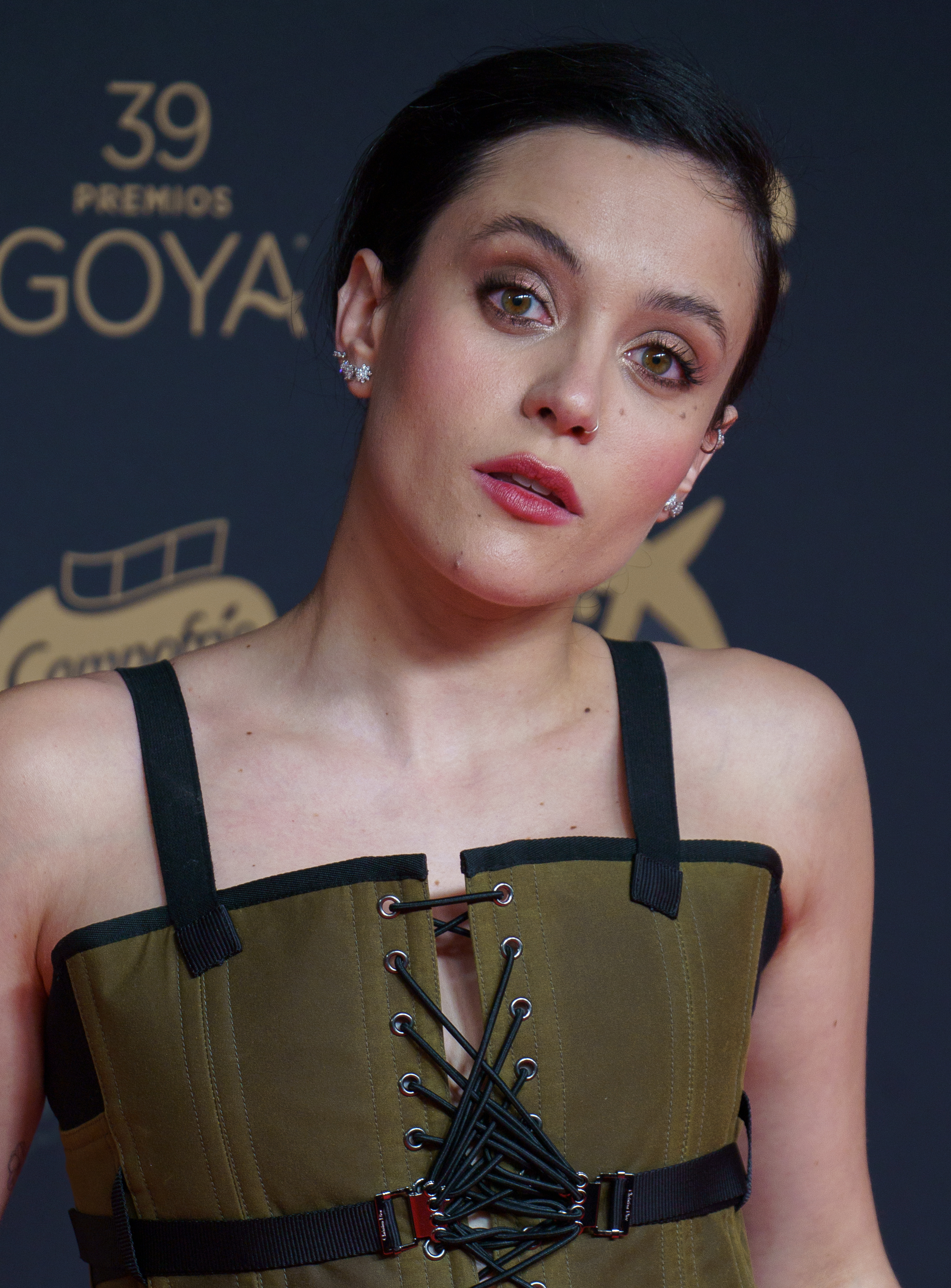
- Guerola at the 2025 Goya Awards
- Born: 1997 (age 28–29); Xàtiva, Valencia, Spain
- Occupation: Actress
- Years active: 2022–present

Marina Guerola (born 1997) is a Spanish actress. Born in Xàtiva, in the province of Valencia, she made her feature film debut as Madalen in Los destellos (2024), the third film directed by Pilar Palomero, a performance that brought her a nomination for the Goya Award for Best New Actress.

Guerola made her feature film debut as Madalen in Los destellos (2024), the third film directed by Pilar Palomero, which premiered at the San Sebastián International Film Festival. The performance brought her a nomination for the Goya Award for Best New Actress, as well as nominations at the Feroz Awards and the CEC Awards. She has since appeared in the Movistar Plus+ series Yakarta (2025) and in the second season of the period drama Entre tierras (2026), as well as in the films Los justos (2026) and Las vidas posibles de mi madre.

== Early life and training ==
Guerola was born in Xàtiva in 1997 and began playing the saxophone at the age of five, completing her studies at the Orihuela Conservatory of Music in 2016. She graduated from the school of dramatic art in Murcia in 2020 and took further acting courses with Víctor Antolí, John Strasberg and Jorge Lorza, appearing on stage in the plays Culpables (2022) and Samsara.

During her final year at the conservatory she concluded that music was not her vocation and, encouraged by a cousin, spent two months preparing for the entrance examinations of the Escuela Superior de Arte Dramático (ESAD) in Murcia. Culpables was written by María José Gálvez, whom she had met at the school while Gálvez was studying directing, and Samsara was a physical theatre piece. She moved to Madrid in September 2021.

She has said that she never planned on an acting career as a child and only decided to change course at the age of twenty. Having completed her drama training during the COVID-19 pandemic, she worked in an escape room and performed short shows for children in schools while she continued to train and audition, until she was called to the casting for Palomero's new film.

== Career ==
=== Film debut in Los destellos ===
Guerola made her feature debut in Los destellos, Palomero's third film, adapted from "Un corazón demasiado grande", a short story by the Basque writer Eider Rodríguez. She plays Madalen, the daughter of Isabel (Patricia López Arnaiz) and Ramón (Antonio de la Torre), a terminally ill man whom Isabel reluctantly begins to care for after fifteen years of estrangement; Julián López plays Isabel's new partner. The film was presented in the official selection of the San Sebastián International Film Festival on 22 September 2024, and was shot in the Tarragona village of Horta de Sant Joan, where the director had filmed her earlier short films.

Guerola auditioned twice for Palomero, and the cast spent several weeks living together before filming in order to build the relationships between their characters. The success of the film allowed her to give up her job in an escape room and work as an actress full time. Interviewed shortly before the 2025 awards season, she said she hoped that the recognition given to her performance would be a step forward for Valencian cinema, noting that few Valencian performers reach such awards.

Despite the attention the film brought her, Guerola continued auditioning without immediate results after its release and came to question her future in the profession, crediting perseverance and the support of her agent for keeping her on course.

=== Television ===
In 2025 Guerola joined the cast of Yakarta, a Movistar Plus+ series created by Diego San José about a former Olympic badminton player (Javier Cámara) who coaches a talented teenager (Carla Quílez). Consisting of six episodes of about thirty minutes, it premiered on 6 November 2025 after an initial screening at the Valladolid International Film Festival.

She was subsequently cast in the second season of the Atresmedia period drama Entre tierras, led by Megan Montaner. Produced with Boomerang TV and made up of ten episodes set almost two decades after the events of the first season, it was filmed in Almería and Castilla-La Mancha.

=== Later film work ===
Guerola is part of the ensemble cast of Los justos, the first feature directed by the screenwriters Fer Pérez and Jorge A. Lara, in which nine members of a jury deliberating a corruption case are secretly offered a million euros each to change their verdict. She appears alongside Carmen Machi, Marcelo Subiotto, Ane Gabarain, Pilar Castro, Bruna Cusí, Vito Sanz, Hugo Welzel and Aimar Vega. The film screened out of competition in the official section of the 29th Málaga Film Festival before its release in Spanish cinemas in April 2026.

In late 2025 she took a leading role in Las vidas posibles de mi madre, written and directed by Jorge Dorado and based on a manuscript and photographs the director found at his mother's house after she was diagnosed with Alzheimer's disease. Guerola heads the cast with Aída de la Cruz, Ana Wagener, Quim Ávila and Joan Solé, with Mercedes Sampietro in a special appearance. The seven-week shoot took place in Catalonia, Luxembourg and Paris, with the film produced by Fasten Films and Vaca Films together with the Luxembourgish company Deal Productions.

== Awards and nominations ==
Los destellos brought Guerola three nominations during the 2025 Spanish awards season, all of them for her performance as Madalen. At the 12th Feroz Awards, held in Pontevedra on 25 January 2025, she was nominated for best supporting actress in a film. The film gathered six Feroz nominations in all, among them best drama film and best director for Palomero, with further acting nominations for López Arnaiz, De la Torre and Julián López.

She was also nominated for the best new actress medal at the 80th edition of the awards of the Círculo de Escritores Cinematográficos, a category won by Lucía Veiga for Soy Nevenka; Los destellos took two medals that year, for supporting actor and adapted screenplay. At the 39th Goya Awards she was nominated for best new actress, an award that went to Laura Weissmahr for Salve María.
