= They Will Be Dust =

- Film poster
- Spanish: Polvo serán
- Directed by: Carlos Marques-Marcet
- Written by: Carlos Marques-Marcet; Clara Roquet; Coral Cruz
- Produced by: Tono Folguera; Ariadna Dot; Giovanni Pompili; Eugenia Mumenthaler; David Epiney
- Starring: Ángela Molina; Alfredo Castro; Mònica Almirall Batet; Patrícia Bargalló; Alván Prado; Manuela Biedermann
- Cinematography: Gabriel Sandru
- Edited by: Chiara Dainese
- Music by: Maria Arnal
- Production companies: Lastor Media; Alina Film; Kino Produzioni
- Distributed by: Wanda Vision / Elastica Films (es)
- Release dates: 7 September 2024 (TIFF); 15 November 2024 (Spain)
- Countries: Spain; Switzerland; Italy
- Language: Spanish

They Will Be Dust (Spanish: Polvo serán) is a 2024 tragicomedy musical film directed by Carlos Marques-Marcet from a screenplay by Marques-Marcet, Clara Roquet and Coral Cruz starring Ángela Molina, Alfredo Castro, and Mònica Almirall.

== Plot ==
After a woman with an incurable disease (Claudia) decides to end her life, her significant other Flavio sets in motion a plan to die together in Switzerland, while their daughter Violeta ends up as an unmeant middle woman.

== Cast ==
- Ángela Molina as Claudia
- Alfredo Castro as Flavio
- Mònica Almirall as Violeta
- Patrícia Bargalló as Lea
- Alván Prado as Manuel
- Manuela Biedermann as Inger

== Production ==
The film is a Spanish-Swiss-Italian co-production by Lastor Media, Alina Film, and Kino Produzioni, with backing and funding from ICAA, ICEC, Creative Europe's MEDIA, RTVE, Movistar Plus+, DGCA, IDM Film Fund & Commission Südtirol Alto Adige and Eurimages. Gabriel Sandru took over cinematography duties. The score was composed by Maria Arnal. Shooting locations included Barcelona.

== Release ==
The Will Be Dust had its world premiere in competition for the Platform Prize at the 49th Toronto International Film Festival on 7 September 2024. It was also selected as the opening film of the 69th Valladolid International Film Festival. Co-distributed by Wanda Vision and Elastica Films, it was scheduled to be released theatrically in Spain on 15 November 2024.

== Reception ==
On the review aggregator website Rotten Tomatoes, 100% of 11 critics' reviews are positive, with an average rating of 7.4/10.

Stephen Saito of Variety wrote that the film "proves moving in more ways than one", "achieving a level of intimacy unusual even for its reliably sensitive director".

Olivia Popp of Cineuropa wrote that the film "goes for broke in all its sincerity and quirkiness — and succeeds".

Jonathan Holland of ScreenDaily deemed the film to be an "admirably unsentimental and involving end-of-life drama that comes, unusually, peppered with dance sequences".

Javier Ocaña of El País declared They Will Be Dust "a bold, almost senseless, volcanic, pretentious, vociferous, passionate (though not enthralling)" work, with some dance sequences veering towards Eliseo Subiela's levels of cheesiness.

Philipp Engel of Cinemanía rated The Will Be Dust 4 out of 5 stars, writing about an "intelligent" film, "without the slightest hint of sentimentality".

== Accolades ==
Year	Award	Category	Nominee(s)	Result	Ref.
2024	2024 Toronto International Film Festival	Platform Prize		Won	
2024	69th Valladolid International Film Festival	Silver Spike		Won	
2024	19th Rome Film Festival	Best Actress	Ángela Molina	Won	
2025	17th Gaudí Awards	Best Non-Catalan Language Film		Won	
2025	17th Gaudí Awards	Best Director	Carlos Marques-Marcet	Nominated	
2025	17th Gaudí Awards	Best Original Screenplay	Carlos Marques-Marcet, Clara Roquet, Coral Cruz	Nominated	
2025	17th Gaudí Awards	Best Actress	Ángela Molina	Nominated	
2025	17th Gaudí Awards	Best Actor	Alfredo Castro	Nominated	
2025	17th Gaudí Awards	Best Original Score	Maria Arnal	Won	
2025	17th Gaudí Awards	Best Cinematography	Gabriel Sandru	Nominated	
2025	17th Gaudí Awards	Best Editing	Chiara Dainese	Won	
2025	17th Gaudí Awards	Best Production Supervision	Mayca Sanz, Andrés Mellinas	Nominated	
2025	17th Gaudí Awards	Best Art Direction	Laia Ateca	Won	
2025	17th Gaudí Awards	Best Costume Design	Pau Aulí	Nominated	
2025	17th Gaudí Awards	Best Makeup and Hairstyles	Natalia Albert, Marta Xipell	Nominated	
2025	17th Gaudí Awards	Best Sound	Xavier Lavorel, Maya Baur, Kathleen Moser, Denis Séchaud	Nominated	
2025	17th Gaudí Awards	Best Visual Effects	Diana Cuyàs	Nominated	
2025	12th Feroz Awards	Best Original Soundtrack	Maria Arnal	Nominated	
2025	12th Feroz Awards	Best Trailer	Miguel Ángel Trudu	Won	
2025	12th Feroz Awards	Best Film Poster	Emilio Lorente, Lluís Tudela	Nominated	
2025	12th Feroz Awards	'Arrebato' Special Award (Fiction)		Won	
2025	39th Goya Awards	Best Actor	Alfredo Castro	Nominated	

== See also ==
- List of Spanish films of 2024
