= Little Loves =

- Theatrical release poster
- Spanish: Los pequeños amores
- Directed by: Celia Rico Clavellino
- Written by: Celia Rico Clavellino
- Produced by: Sandra Tapia Díaz; Ibon Cormenzana; Ignasi Estapé; Ángel Durández; Cleber Beretta Custodio; Francisco Celma
- Starring: María Vázquez; Adriana Ozores; Aimar Vega
- Cinematography: Santiago Racaj
- Edited by: Fernando Franco
- Production companies: Arcadia Motion Pictures; Viracocha Films AIE; Noodles Productions
- Distributed by: BTeam Pictures
- Release dates: 4 March 2024 (Málaga); 8 March 2024 (Spain)
- Running time: 96 minutes
- Countries: Spain; France
- Language: Spanish

Little Loves (Spanish: Los pequeños amores) is a 2024 Spanish-French drama film written and directed by Celia Rico Clavellino which stars Adriana Ozores and María Vázquez alongside Aimar Vega.

== Plot ==
Set in summertime, the plot follows the uneasy and forced coexistence between Teresa and her mother Ani, in the wake of Ani's minor injury.

== Cast ==
- María Vázquez as Teresa
- Adriana Ozores as Ani
- Aimar Vega as Jonás
- Pep Muñoz as Pablo

== Production ==
The film was produced by Arcadia Motion Pictures and Viracocha Films AIE alongside Noodles Productions with the participation of RTVE, TVC, and Filmin, and the backing and funding from ICAA, ICEC, CNC, and Creative Europe's MEDIA. Shooting locations included Barcelona, Begues, L'Ametlla de Merola, Sant Cugat Sesgarrigues, Olesa de Bonesvalls, La Granada del Penedès, Navarcles, and Madrid.

== Release ==
The film was presented at the 27th Málaga Film Festival on 4 March 2024. Distributed by BTeam Pictures, it was released theatrically in Spain on 8 March 2024.

== Reception ==
Paula Arantzazu Ruiz of Cinemanía rated the film 4 out of 5 stars, underscoring it to be "a film about care filled with affection" in the verdict.

Jonathan Holland of ScreenDaily deemed the film to be an "extremely relatable, low-key drama".

== Accolades ==
Year	Award	Category	Nominee(s)	Result	Ref.
2024	27th Málaga Film Festival	Special Jury Prize		Won	
2024	27th Málaga Film Festival	Best Supporting Actress	Adriana Ozores	Won	
2024	72nd San Sebastián International Film Festival	Dunia Ayaso Award		Won	
2025	17th Gaudí Awards	Best Non-Catalan Language Film		Nominated	
2025	17th Gaudí Awards	Best Supporting Actress	Adriana Ozores	Nominated	
2025	17th Gaudí Awards	Best New Performance	Aimar Vega	Nominated	
2025	4th Carmen Awards	Best Original Screenplay	Celia Rico	Nominated	
2025	39th Goya Awards	Best Editing	Fernando Franco	Nominated	

== See also ==
- List of Spanish films of 2024
