= Self tape =

Self tape may refer to:

- Self-tape,
- Selftape, a 2023 Spanish television series
- "Self-Tape", an episode of Wonder Man
