= Gold Lust =

- Film poster
- Catalan: Escanyapobres
- Directed by: Ibai Abad
- Screenplay by: Ibai Abad; Elisenda Gorgues
- Based on: L'escanyapobres by Narcís Oller
- Produced by: Marc Roma; Jordi Llorca; Sergi Grobas
- Starring: Alex Brendemühl; Mireia Vilapuig; Laura Conejero; Quim Àvila; Juli Mira
- Cinematography: María Codina
- Edited by: Ona Batrolí; Gerard Vila
- Music by: Raquel Sánchez
- Production companies: Abacus; Mayo Films; Nakamura Films
- Distributed by: Carácter Films
- Release dates: 20 April 2024 (BCN Film Fest); 29 November 2024 (Spain)
- Country: Spain
- Language: Catalan

Gold Lust (Catalan: Escanyapobres) is a 2024 Spanish historical drama film directed by Ibai Abad and co-written by Elisenda Gorgues based on the novel by Narcís Oller. It stars Alex Brendemühl and Mireia Vilapuig.

== Plot ==
Set in the fictional village of Pratbell, against the backdrop of the arrival of train to a village in inner Catalonia in the late 19th century, the plot follows the actions of loan shark Oleguer as he preys on the masia belonging to the family of Cileta, who begins to learn about the corruptive power of money.

== Cast ==
- Alex Brendemühl as Oleguer
- Mireia Vilapuig as Cileta
- Laura Conejero as Tuïes
- Quim Àvila as Eloi
- Boris Ruiz as Pere
- Juli Mira as don Magi

== Production ==
Gold Lust is a co-production by Abacus, Mayo Films, and Nakamura Films and it had the participation of 3Cat and À Punt. Shooting locations included La Saira, Crevillent, Salàs de Pallars, Calaf, Bellmunt del Priorat, Móra la Nova, and Mutxamel.

== Release ==
For its world premiere on 20 April 2024, the film made it to the main competition slate of the BCN Film Fest. It is set to be released theatrically in Spain on 29 November 2024.

== Accolades ==
Year	Award	Category	Nominee(s)	Result	Ref.
2025	17th Gaudí Awards	Best Adapted Screenplay	Ibai Abad, Elisenda Gorgues	Nominated	
2025	17th Gaudí Awards	Best New Performance	Mireia Vilapuig	Nominated	
2025	7th Lola Gaos Awards	Best Cinematography and Lighting	Maria Codina	Won	
2025	7th Lola Gaos Awards	Best Costume Design	Cristina Martín, Rocío Pastor	Won	
2025	7th Lola Gaos Awards	Youth Prize for Best Film		Won	

== See also ==
- List of Spanish films of 2024
