= Holy Mother (film) =

- Film poster
- Spanish: La abadesa
- Directed by: Antonio Chavarrías
- Screenplay by: Antonio Chavarrías
- Produced by: Antonio Chavarrías; José María Morales; Miguel Morales; Mónica Lozano; Hubert Toint
- Starring: Daniela Brown; Blanca Romero; Carlos Cuevas
- Cinematography: Julián Elizalde
- Edited by: Clara Martínez Malagelada
- Music by: Ivan Georgiev
- Production companies: Oberon Media; Wanda Visión; Icono 2020 AIE; Saga Film
- Distributed by: Wanda Visión
- Release dates: 7 March 2024 (Málaga); 22 March 2024 (Spain)
- Countries: Spain; Belgium
- Language: Spanish

Holy Mother or The Abbess (Spanish: La abadesa) is a 2024 Spanish-Belgian historical drama film written and directed by Antonio Chavarrías inspired by the life of Emma of Barcelona starring Daniela Brown as the title character alongside Blanca Romero and Carlos Cuevas.

== Plot ==
In the 9th century, 17-year-old Emma is tasked with leading an abbey and Christianizing and repopulating borderland territories upon the death of her father.

== Cast ==
- Daniela Brown as Emma
- Blanca Romero as Eloisa
- Carlos Cuevas as Borrell
- Ernest Villegas as Eduard
- Berta Sánchez as Clara
- Oriol Genís as Odón
- Joaquín Notario as Gotmar
- Anaël Snoek as Melisenda

== Production ==
The film is an Oberon Media (Mónica Lozano and Antonio Chavarrías), Wanda Visión (Miguel Morales and José María Morales), and Icono 2020 AIE production in co-production with Belgium's Saga Film (Hubert Toint), with the participation of RTVE, TV3 and Aragón TV. Shooting locations included Loarre and La Seu Vella.

== Release ==
The film made it to the main competition of the 27th Málaga Film Festival, with a debut date set for 7 March 2024. Distributed by Wanda Visión, it was released theatrically in Spain on 22 March 2024.

== Reception ==
Juan Pando of Fotogramas rated the "austere" film 3 out of 5 stars, singling out "the beautiful simplicity chosen for the mise-en-scène" as the best thing about the film, while negatively citing the sometimes excessively long-winded writing.

Javier Ocaña of El País deemed the film, "overlong and without sufficient plot and emotional handholds", to be "a product that is hardly reprehensible, but which is unlikely to find its audience".

== Accolades ==
| Year | Award | Category | Nominee(s) | Result | Ref. |
|---|---|---|---|---|---|
| 2025 | 17th Gaudí Awards | Best Art Direction | Irene Montcada | Nominated | |
| 2025 | 17th Gaudí Awards | Best Costume Design | Catherine Marchand, Pau Aulí | Nominated | |

== See also ==
- List of Spanish films of 2024
