= Marion (2024 film) =

2024 British short film

- Festival poster
- Directed by: Joe Weiland; Finn Constantine
- Written by: Joe Weiland; Finn Constantine
- Produced by: Marija Djikic; Nicolas Tiry; Noémie Lisbonis Boyer
- Starring: Caroline Noguès-Larbère; Radouan Leflahi; Laurent Fernandez; Manuel Severi; Chloé Bugard
- Cinematography: Harry Wheeler
- Edited by: Phil Currie; Maxime Caro
- Music by: James William-Blades
- Production companies: OB42; Solab Pictures
- Release dates: 6 September 2024 (Venice); 8 September 2024 (TIFF)
- Running time: 13 minutes
- Countries: United Kingdom; France
- Language: French

Marion is a 2024 French-language short drama film written and directed by Joe Weiland and Finn Constantine. The BAFTA nominated short film follows the journey of Marion, a mother and the only female bull-dodger (écarteur) in France, in the traditional sport of course landaise.

The United Kingdom and France co-production film premiered in the Orizzonti Short Films International Competition at the 81st Venice International Film Festival on 6 September 2024. and at the 2024 Toronto International Film Festival on 8 September 2024 in Short Cuts programme 6.

== Synopsis ==
Marion is the sole female bull-dodger in France. This short film captures the thirteen minutes leading up to Marion's debut performance, delving into her struggle against sexism and societal biases. It portrays her journey through a male-dominated world, balancing the responsibilities of motherhood with the pursuit of her passion.

== Cast ==
- Caroline Noguès-Larbère as Marion
- Radouan Leflahi
- Laurent Fernandez
- Manuel Severi
- Chloé Bugard

== Production ==
The film is a co-production between OB42 in the United Kingdom and Solab Pictures in France. The film produced by Marija Djikic has Harry Wheeler as Cinematographer. It was shot in December 2023 in Arena of Bayonne, Rue Alfred Boulant, 64100 Bayonne, France. In February 2024, Sienna Miller joined the film as an executive producer.

In July 2024, Cate Blanchett joined the film as an executive producer.

== Release ==
The film had its premiere at the 81st Venice International Film Festival in Orizzonti Short Films International Competition on 6 September 2024.

It was also presented in the Oscar qualifying program in 'On the Verge' section of the Bend Film Festival on 11 October 2024.

It competed in the American Film Institute Fest and was screened as part of Shorts Program: Live Action: 1 on 26 October 2024.

== Accolades ==
Award	Date	Category	Recipient(s)	Result	Ref.
Young Director Award	20 June 2024	Gold Screen	Joe Weiland and Finn Constantine	Won	
Venice International Film Festival	7 September 2024	Orizzonti Best Short Film	Marion	Nominated	
Valladolid International Film Festival	26 October 2024	International Short Film Official Section	Marion	Nominated	
Show Me Shorts	28 October 2024	Best International Film	Marion	Nominated	
British Academy Film Awards	16 February 2025	Best British Short Film	Marion	Nominated	
