= Many People Need to Die =

2026 Spanish comedy television series

- Promotional release poster
- Spanish: Se tiene que morir mucha gente
- Created by: Victoria Martín
- Based on: Se tiene que morir mucha gente by Victoria Martín
- Written by: Victoria Martín
- Directed by: Victoria Martín; Sandra Romero; Nacho Pardo
- Starring: Anna Castillo; Macarena García; Laura Weissmahr

Production
- Executive producers: Fran Araújo; Cristina Merino; Victoria Martín; Nacho Pardo; Oriol Maymó
- Production companies: Movistar Plus+; Corte y Confección de Películas; Living Producciones

Original release
- Network: Movistar Plus+

Many People Need to Die (Spanish: Se tiene que morir mucha gente) is a Spanish comedy television series created and written by Victoria Martín based on her own novel of the same name. It stars Anna Castillo, Macarena García, and Laura Weissmahr.

== Plot ==
The plot follows three childhood friends (Bárbara, Maca, and Elena) who, 20 years after, are navigating life complexities.

== Cast ==
- Anna Castillo as Bárbara
- Macarena García as Elena
- Laura Weissmahr as Maca
- Sofía Otero
- Alba Galocha
- Óscar de la Fuente
- Ramón Rados
- Yunez Chaib

== Production ==
Many People Need to Die was created by Victoria Martín based on her debut novel. The series is a Movistar Plus+ original production along with Corte y Confección de películas and Living Producciones. Angello Faccini worked as cinematographer.

== Release ==
The series had its world premiere at the 9th Cannesseries on 25 April 2026. Consisting of 6 episodes, it is scheduled to debut on Movistar Plus+ on 21 May 2026.

Flow purchased the series for the Argentine market.

== See also ==
- 2026 in Spanish television
