= The Quiet Maid =

- Theatrical release poster
- Spanish: Calladita
- Directed by: Miguel Faus
- Written by: Miguel Faus
- Produced by: Miguel Faus; Carlo D'Ursi
- Starring: Paula Grimaldo; Ariadna Gil; Pol Hermoso; Luis Bermejo
- Cinematography: Antonio Galisteo
- Edited by: Iacopo Calabrese
- Music by: Paula Olaz
- Production companies: Calladita Films; Potenza Producciones; Decentralized Pictures
- Distributed by: Karma Films
- Release dates: November 2023 (PÖFF); 24 May 2024 (Spain)
- Running time: 93 minutes
- Country: Spain
- Languages: Spanish; Catalan

The Quiet Maid (Spanish: Calladita) is a 2023 satirical drama film written and directed by Miguel Faus which stars Paula Grimaldo alongside Ariadna Gil, Pol Hermoso, and Luis Bermejo.

== Plot ==
Working for an upper-class family on the Costa Brava, quiet Colombian domestic maid Ana unlocks new ways to enjoy the Summer after coming across fellow maid Gisela.

== Cast ==
- Paula Grimaldo as Ana
- Ariadna Gil as Andrea
- Luis Bermejo as Pedro
- Nany Tovar as Gisela
- Pol Hermoso as Jacobo
- Violeta Rodríguez as Claudia

== Production ==
A Calladita Films, Potenza Producciones, and Decentralized Pictures production, the film was partially financed through the Andrews/Bernard Award (a Steven Soderbergh-backed post-production fund granted at the 2023 Sundance Film Festival) and by a crowdfunding campaign through non-fungible tokens (NFC). Jim Cummings served as executive producer. The film was shot in September 2022 in the Costa Brava. Faus explained his film as tackling "issues related to class differences and injustices from a satirical portrait of the Catalan upper middle class".

== Release ==
The Quiet Maid world premiered at the Tallinn Black Nights Film Festival (PÖFF) in November 2023. Its festival run also included screenings at the 27th Málaga Film Festival and the 8th BCN Film Fest. It is scheduled to be released theatrically in Spain on 24 May 2024.

== Reception ==
Wendy Ide of ScreenDaily wrote that the film "combines a distinctive tone and striking visual sense with a knock-out performance from Paula Grimaldo".

Davide Abbatescianni of Cineuropa assessed that the film "would have benefited from sharper, more sardonic writing".

Laura Pérez of Fotogramas rated the film 3 out of 5 stars, highlighting the discovery of Paula Grimaldo as the best thing about the film.

== Accolades ==
Year	Award	Category	Nominee(s)	Result	Ref.
2025	17th Gaudí Awards	Best New Director	Miguel Faus	Nominated	
2025	17th Gaudí Awards	Best Adapted Screenplay	Miguel Faus	Nominated	
2025	39th Goya Awards	Best New Director	Miguel Faus	Nominated	

== See also ==
- List of Spanish films of 2024
