= Resistance Reels =

- Spanish theatrical release poster
- Spanish: Caja de resistencia
- Portuguese: Caixa de Resistência
- Directed by: Concha Barquero Artés; Alejandro Alvarado Jódar
- Written by: Concha Barquero Artés; Alejandro Alvarado Jódar
- Narrated by: Concha Barquero Artés; Alejandro Alvarado Jódar
- Cinematography: Raquel Fernández Núñez
- Edited by: Concha Barquero Artés; Alejandro Alvarado Jódar
- Music by: Paloma Peñarrubia
- Production companies: Azhar Media; Alvarquero; Blablabla Media
- Distributed by: Nueve Cartas (Spain)
- Release dates: 19 October 2024 (Seminci); 27 March 2025 (Portugal); 12 September 2025 (Spain)
- Running time: 99 minutes
- Countries: Spain; Portugal
- Languages: Spanish; Portuguese

Resistance Reels (Spanish: Caja de resistencia; Portuguese: Caixa de Resistência) is a 2024 Spanish-Portuguese experimental documentary film written, directed, and narrated by Concha Barquero Artés and Alejandro Alvarado Jódar about the legacy of Fernando Ruiz Vergara.

== Plot ==
The plot explores the unfinished projects of Andalusian filmmaker Fernando Ruiz Vergara, the director of Rocío, a documentary film delving on the Francoist repression in Andalusia which was judicially censored in post-Francoist Spain, and which, to this date, still features censorship cuts in the original version.

== Production ==
The films is a Azhar Media, Alvarquero, and Blablabla Media co-production with backing from ICAA and Canal Sur. It was shot in Portugal and Andalusia.

== Release ==
For its world premiere, Resistance Reels was set to screen at the 69th Valladolid International Film Festival on 19 October 2024. Its festival run also included selections for screenings at the 21st Seville European Film Festival, the international competition section of the 26th Jeonju International Film Festival (for its international premiere), Porto/Post/Doc, and Caminhos do Cinema Português. It was released theatrically in Portugal on 27 March 2025. Distributed by Nueve Cartas, it was released theatrically in Spain on 12 September 2025.

== Reception ==
Paula Arantzazu Ruiz of Cinemanía rated the film 4 out of 5 stars, declaring it "a challenging and hopeful documentary that sheds light like few others on the shadows of our recent history".

Manuel J. Lombardo of Diario de Sevilla gave the film 4 stars, deeming it to be both "faithful to its origins as deliberately free, reflective, and equally combative with regard to the images and discourses of the present".

Elsa Fernández-Santos of El País lamented that "ultimately, the film suffers from too many puns—many of them auditory—that do not add much".

Philipp Engel of La Vanguardia rated the film 5 out of 5 stars, billing it as "an instant classic in terms of its use of archival footage, and undoubtedly one of the films of the year".

== Accolades ==
Year	Award	Category	Nominee(s)	Result	Ref.
2025	12th Feroz Awards	'Arrebato' Special Award (non-Fiction)		Nominated	

== See also ==
- List of Spanish films of 2025
- List of Portuguese films of 2025
