= The Righteous (2026 film) =

- Theatrical release poster
- Spanish: Los justos
- Directed by: Jorge A. Lara; Fer Pérez
- Screenplay by: Jorge A. Lara; Fer Pérez
- Produced by: Luis Collar; Jorge Moreno; Yadira Ávalos
- Starring: Carmen Machi; Vito Sanz; Pilar Castro; Marcelo Subiotto; Ane Gabarain; Bruna Cusí; Hugo Welzel; Marina Guerola; Aimar Vega
- Cinematography: Alfonso Postigo
- Edited by: Ana Álvarez Ossorio
- Music by: Beatriz López-Nogales
- Production companies: Nephilim Producciones; Naif Films
- Distributed by: Wanda Visión
- Release dates: 9 March 2026 (Málaga); 30 April 2026 (Spain)
- Country: Spain
- Language: Spanish

The Righteous (Spanish: Los justos) is a 2026 thriller film written and directed by Jorge A. Lara and Fer Pérez. Its ensemble cast is toplined by Carmen Machi, Vito Sanz, Pilar Castro, Marcelo Subiotto, Ane Gabarain, Bruna Cusí, Hugo Welzel, Marina Guerola, and Aimar Vega.

== Plot ==
Each of the nine members of a jury set to deliver a verdict in a rather transparent corruption case are offered €1 million to look the other way and change their position from guilty to innocent, but they need to reach unanimity.

== Cast ==
- Carmen Machi as Remedios
- Vito Sanz as Javi
- Pilar Castro as Cecilia
- Marcelo Subiotto as Darío
- Ane Gabarain as Marisa
- Bruna Cusí as Alicia
- Hugo Welzel as Patrick
- Marina Guerola
- Aimar Vega as David

== Production ==
The film is the directorial debut feature of seasoned screenwriters Jorge A. Lara and Fer Pérez. It was produced by Nephilim and Naif Films, and it had the participation of RTVE. Filming began on 11 August 2025. Shooting locations included Las Palmas.

== Release ==
The Righteous was presented at the 29th Málaga Film Festival in an out-of-competition official selection slot on 9 March 2026. Distributed by Wanda Visión, it is scheduled to be released theatrically in Spain on 30 April 2026. Feelsales took over international sales.

== Reception ==
Pablo Vázquez of Fotogramas rated the film 4 out of 5 stars, considering it to be "bold in its blend of claustrophobic thriller and biting comedy, [and] brilliant in its dialogue and the performances of a superb cast".

Andrea G. Bermejo of Cinemanía rated the film 4 out of 5 stars, assessing that the directors elevate their great script with a "magnificent" cast.

Víctor A. Gómez of La Opinión de Málaga wrote that Lara and Pérez enjoy the backing from an "estupendous" cast far outshining the text they are working with.

In a 2-star rating, Manuel J. Lombardo of Diario de Sevilla pointed out that the whole "never manages to sharpen [enough] or inject vitriol into its materials".

== See also ==
- List of Spanish films of 2026
