= Glimmers =

- Theatrical release poster
- Spanish: Los destellos
- Directed by: Pilar Palomero
- Written by: Pilar Palomero
- Based on: Bihotz handiegia by Eider Rodriguez
- Produced by: Valérie Delpierre; Simón de Santiago; Fernando Bovaira
- Starring: Patricia López Arnaiz; Antonio de la Torre; Marina Guerola; Julián López
- Cinematography: Daniela Cajías
- Edited by: Sofi Escudé Poulenc
- Production companies: MOD Producciones; Misent Producciones; Inicia Films
- Distributed by: Caramel Films
- Release dates: 22 September 2024 (Zinemaldia); 4 October 2024 (Spain)
- Country: Spain
- Language: Spanish

Glimmers (Spanish: Los destellos) is a 2024 Spanish drama film written and directed by Pilar Palomero based on the story Bihotz handiegia by Eider Rodriguez starring Patricia López Arnaiz alongside Antonio de la Torre, Marina Guerola, and Julián López.

== Plot ==
Upon request from her daughter Madalen, Isabel starts paying regular visits to her former husband Ramón, who is now ill, unburying resentments.

== Cast ==
- Patricia López Arnaiz as Isabel
- Marina Guerola as Madalen
- Antonio de la Torre as Ramón
- Julián López as Nacho

== Production ==
Written by Pilar Palomero, the screenplay adapts Eider Rodriguez's story Un corazón demasiado grande, contained in the book of the same name (Bihotz handiegia in the Basque original). The film is a MOD Producciones, Misent Producciones and Inicia Films production and it had the participation of RTVE, Movistar Plus+, TVC and À Punt and backing from ICAA, ICEC, and IVC. It was lensed by Daniela Cajías. Shooting locations included Horta de Sant Joan, Terra Alta.

== Release ==
Glimmers was presented in the official competition of the 72nd San Sebastián International Film Festival on 22 September 2024. It will be released theatrically in Spain by Caramel Films on 4 October 2024.

== Reception ==
Luis Martínez of El Mundo gave Glimmers 4 stars, deeming it to be Palomero's best film and a "colossal film in each of its doubts".

Júlia Olmo of Cineuropa described Glimmers as "a moving, devastating and beautiful film, that achieves great depth about the end of life and its continuity".

Nando Salvà of El Periódico de Catalunya rated Glimmers 4 out of 5 stars, considering it to be, "by far", Palomero's best film.

Manuel J. Lombardo of Diario de Sevilla gave Glimmers 4 stars, claiming to have seen and heard a "truly moving film".

=== Accolades ===
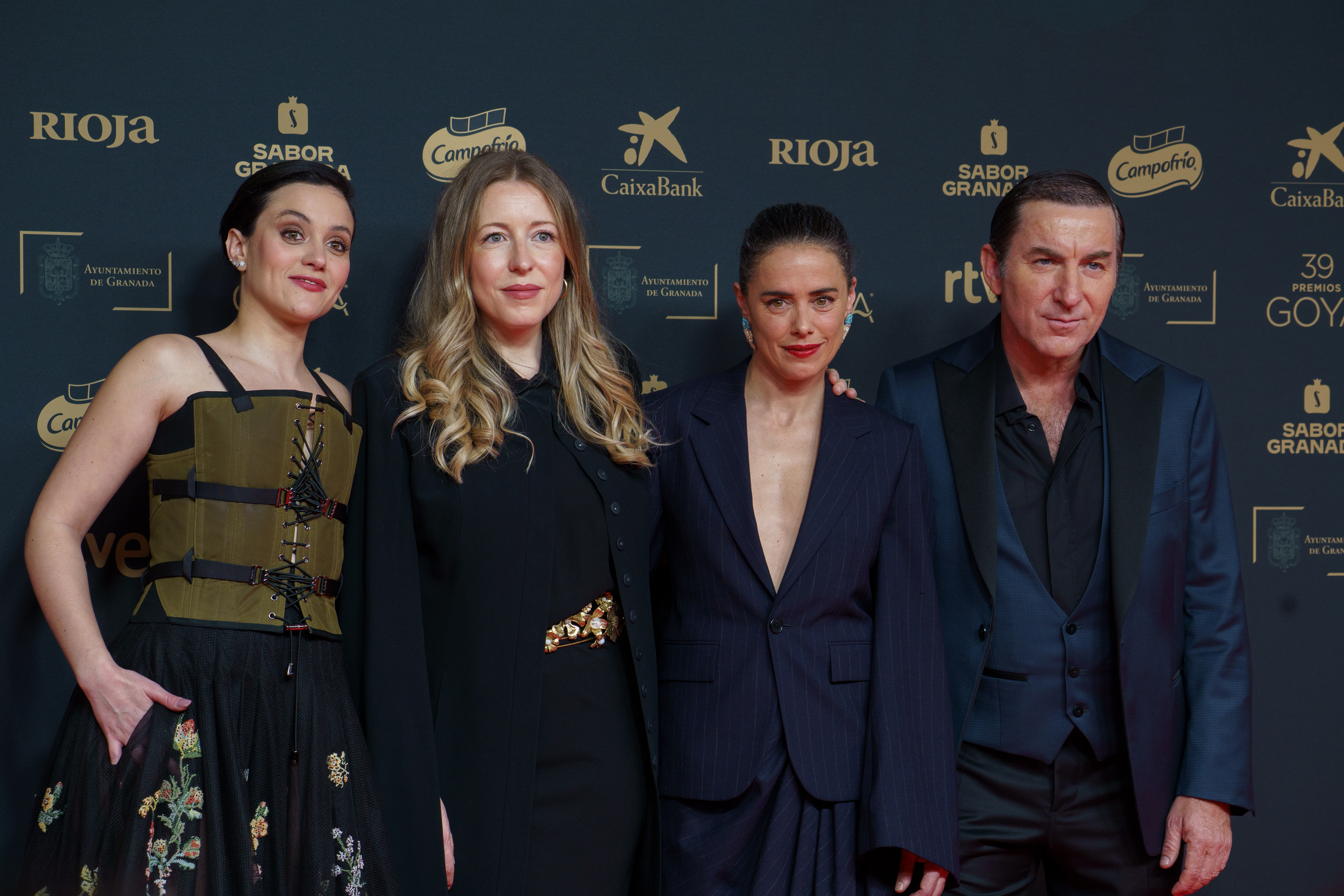
Guerola, Palomero, López Arnaiz, and De la Torre attending the 39th Goya Awards.

Award	Ceremony date	Category	Recipient(s)	Result	Ref.
San Sebastián International Film Festival	28 September 2024	Golden Seashell	Glimmers	Nominated	
San Sebastián International Film Festival	28 September 2024	Silver Shell for Best Leading Performance	Patricia López Arnaiz	Won	
San Sebastián International Film Festival	28 September 2024	SIGNIS Award	Glimmers	Won	
Forqué Awards	14 December 2024	Best Actress in a Film	Patricia López Arnaiz	Nominated	
Forqué Awards	14 December 2024	Best Actor in a Film	Antonio de la Torre	Nominated	
Gaudí Awards	18 January 2025	Best Non-Catalan Language Film	Glimmers	Nominated	
Gaudí Awards	18 January 2025	Best Adapted Screenplay	Pilar Palomero	Nominated	
Gaudí Awards	18 January 2025	Best Actress	Patricia López Arnaiz	Nominated	
Gaudí Awards	18 January 2025	Best Supporting Actor	Antonio de la Torre	Nominated	
Feroz Awards	25 January 2025	Best Drama Film		Nominated	
Feroz Awards	25 January 2025	Best Director	Pilar Palomero	Nominated	
Feroz Awards	25 January 2025	Best Main Actress in a Film	Patricia López Arnaiz	Nominated	
Feroz Awards	25 January 2025	Best Main Actor in a Film	Antonio de la Torre	Nominated	
Feroz Awards	25 January 2025	Best Supporting Actress in a Film	Marina Guerola	Nominated	
Feroz Awards	25 January 2025	Best Supporting Actor in a Film	Julián López	Nominated	
Carmen Awards	1 February 2025	Best Supporting Actor	Antonio de la Torre	Won	
CEC Medals	3 February 2025	Best Film	Glimmers	Nominated	
CEC Medals	3 February 2025	Best Director	Pilar Palomero	Nominated	
CEC Medals	3 February 2025	Best Adapted Screenplay	Pilar Palomero	Won	
CEC Medals	3 February 2025	Best Actress	Patricia López Arnaiz	Nominated	
CEC Medals	3 February 2025	Best Supporting Actor	Antonio de la Torre	Won	
CEC Medals	3 February 2025	Best New Actress	Marina Guerola	Nominated	
CEC Medals	3 February 2025	Best Cinematography	Daniela Cajías	Nominated	
Goya Awards	8 February 2025	Best Actress	Patricia López Arnaiz	Nominated	
Goya Awards	8 February 2025	Best Supporting Actor	Antonio de la Torre	Nominated	
Goya Awards	8 February 2025	Best New Actress	Marina Guerola	Nominated	
Goya Awards	8 February 2025	Best Adapted Screenplay	Pilar Palomero	Nominated	
Actors and Actresses Union Awards	10 March 2025	Best Film Actress in a Leading Role	Patricia López Arnaiz	Nominated	
Actors and Actresses Union Awards	10 March 2025	Best Film Actor in a Secondary Role	Antonio de la Torre	Nominated	

== See also ==
- List of Spanish films of 2024
