= Katixa Agirre =

Spanish writer

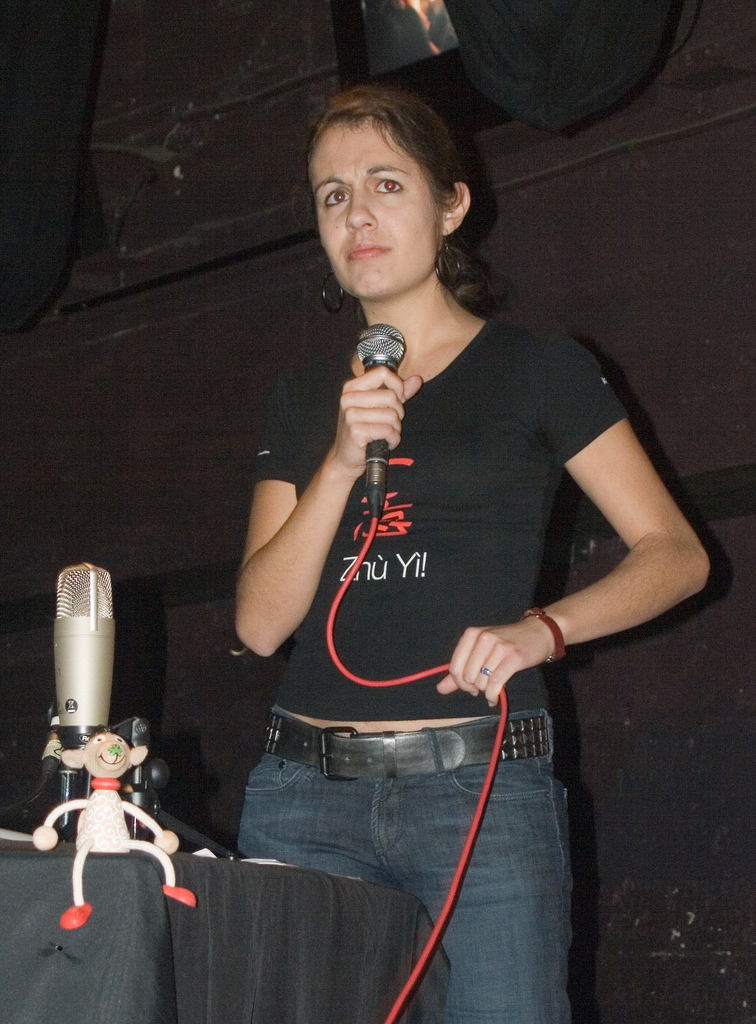
- Katixa Agirre
- Born: October 27, 1980 (age 45); Vitoria-Gasteiz, Spain
- Education: University of the Basque Country
- Occupation: Writer

Katixa Agirre Miguelez (born October 27, 1980) is a Basque writer.

Born in Vitoria-Gasteiz, Agirre studied at the University of the Basque Country, receiving a bachelor's degree in audiovisual communication in 2003, a master's degree in screenwriting, then a doctoral degree in audiovisual communication in 2010. Her thesis analyzed the representations of the Lolita myth in Hollywood films. She then did postdoctoral work, including stints at Queen Mary University of London and the University of East Anglia. Since 2013, she has taught at the Universidad del Pais Vasco.

Published mainly in her native Basque language, Agirre's written works include the short story collections Sua falta zaigu (2007), Habitat (2009) and the children's books Paularen seigarren atzamarra, Ez naiz sirena bat, eta zer? and Patzikuren problemak. Additionally, Agirre writes for media outlets such as Diario de Noticias de Álava, Deia, Aizu! and Argia. In 2015, she published her first novel Atertu arte Itxaron? (Elkar, 2015), which won the Premio 111 Akademia. A road novel, this book has been translated into Spanish, Danish and Bulgarian. In 2018, Agirre published another novel Amek ez dute (Elkar).

In 2020, she was named as one of the most promising young writers in Spain by the 10 de 30 project of the AECID.

In 2024 a film titled Salve Maria based on her novel Mother's Don't was directed by Mar Coll. The film made it to the Main Competition of 77th Locarno Film Festival.

== Awards and honors ==
- 2015 Premio 111 Akademia for Amek ez dute idazten
- 2016 XVI Beca de Novela Agustín Zubikarai from the Ondarroa City Council and Elkar for Amek ez dute idazten

== Publications ==
=== Books ===
- Habitat (in Basque). Elkar. 2009. ISBN 978-84-97836-71-5.
- Orgasmus (in Basque). Txalaparta. 2010. ISBN 978-84-81366-00-6.
- Atertu arte itxaron (in Basque). Elkar. 2015. ISBN 978-84-90273-58-6.
- Los turistas desganados (in Basque). Elkar. 2015. ISBN 9788490273586.
- Amek ez dute (in Basque). Elkar. 2018. ISBN 978-84-90278-08-6.
- Las madres no (in Catalan). Editorial Transito. 2019. ISBN 978-84-94909-55-9.
- Berriz zentauro (in Basque). Elkar. 2022. ISBN 978-84-13602-05-9.

=== Children's books ===
==== Amaia Lapitz series ====
1. Amaia Lapitz eta erregina gorriaren hilobia (in Basque). Illustrated by Alex Orbe Ferreiro. 2010.
2. Amaia Lapitz eta Didoren ermandade sekretua (in Basque). Illustrated by Alex Orbe Ferreiro. 2013.
3. Amaia Lapitz eta Festoseko diskoa (in Basque). Illustrated by Alex Orbe Ferreiro. Elkar. 2021. ISBN 9788413600987.

=== Contributions ===
- Telezailak: Nork esan zuen telebistak tontotu egiten duela? (in Basque). Txalaparta. 2011. ISBN 978-84-15313-01-4.
- Emekiro. Verhalen van jonge schrijfsters uit Baskenland (in Dutch). Zirimiri Press. 2011. ISBN 9789490042028.
- Vírgenes catódicas, putas recalcitrantes (in Catalan). Txalaparta. 2015. ISBN 978-84-16350-11-7.
- El otro Oeste: Siete ensayos desde las fronteras del western (in Catalan). Episkaia. 2021. ISBN 9788494922374.
- Borradores del futuro (in Catalan). Consonni. 2023. ISBN 9788419490179.
