= Filmin =

Spanish video on demand service

Comunidad Filmin, S.L.
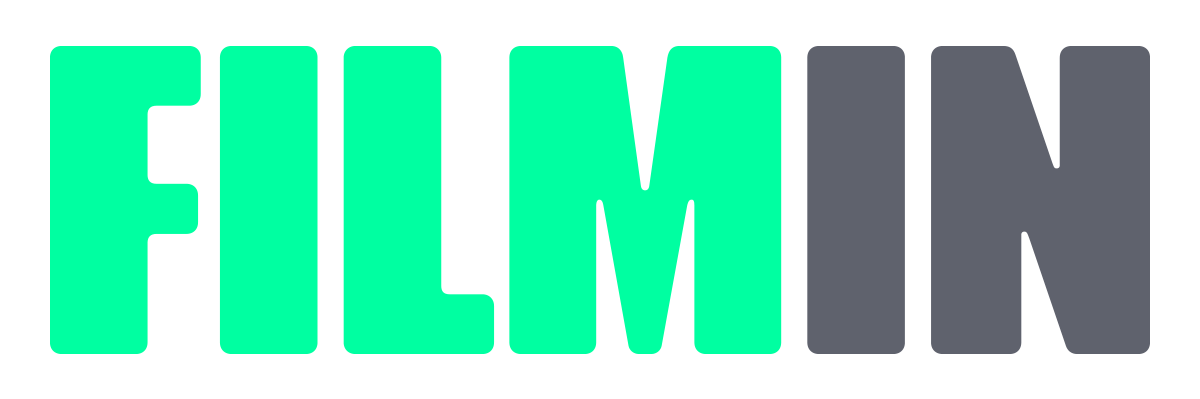
- Founded: 2007
- Headquarters: Carrer Plató 26, Barcelona, Spain
- Founders: Juan Carlos Tous; José Antonio de Luna; Jaume Ripoll
- Products: Streaming media; Pay television; Video on demand
- Website: https://www.filmin.es/
- Launched: 2008 (platform); 2010 (SVOD service)

Comunidad Filmin S.L., doing business as Filmin, is a Spanish subscription video on demand streaming service, primarily dedicated to streaming independent films, as well as a production company and film distributor. The company headquarters is located in Barcelona.

== History ==
Founded by Juan Carlos Tous, José Antonio De Luna and Jaume Ripoll, the company was created in 2007. The platform partnered with distribution companies such as Golem, Tornasol, Wanda, El Deseo, Continental, Vértigo, and—later—Avalon. Owing to the special authorization from the ICAA, Tiro en la cabeza became the first Spanish film simultaneously released in theatres and online (on Filmin) in 2008. The pay-subscription service began in 2010.

In 2020 the investment funds Nazca Capital and Seaya Ventures (stakeholder in Cabify and Glovo) acquired a 51% of the company shares. As of 2021, the platform had 15,000 titles, most of them consisting of European films (65%).

The platform released its first original series, Doctor Portuondo, in October 2021.

In August 2022, the platform premiered its first original documentary film. It was the movie The Forger by creator Kike Maíllo, and the premiere took place at the Atlàntida Mallorca Film Fest.

As of April 2023, it has released another two original series: Autodefensa and Selftape.

In January 2025, it was announced that Nazca Capital, which has held control of Filmin together with the investment fund Seaya Ventures since 2020, had hired the investment bank Arcano to handle the sale of Filmin.

In January 2026, its headquarters were vandalized with graffiti following the premiere of the documentary Ícaro: The City in Flames, which gives voice to national police officers stationed in the Catalan capital during the 2019 unrest after the ‘procés’ verdict.

On 12 June 2026, Filmin signed an agreement to acquire the acquisitions and distribution operations of Elastica Films.

== Overview ==
Most of the movies and series in the catalog are offered in two versions: the dubbed version in Spanish, V.E. (Spanish version), and the original version with Spanish subtitles, V.O.S.E. (original version with Spanish subtitles). Streaming technology with adaptive bitrate is used for viewing, meaning that the definition depends on the user’s bandwidth.

== Awards ==
Year	Award	Category	Result	Ref.
2015	59th Sant Jordi Awards	Industry Prize	Won	
2021	Premi Nacional de Comunicació		Won	
