= Selftape =

- Genre: Comedy drama
- Created by: Joana Vilapuig; Mireia Vilapuig
- Directed by: Bàrbara Farré
- Starring: Joana Vilapuig; Mireia Vilapuig
- Country of origin: Spain
- Original languages: Catalan; Spanish; English; Norwegian
- No. of seasons: 1
- No. of episodes: 6

Production
- Executive producers: Joana Vilapuig; Mireia Vilapuig; Pau Freixas; Iván Mercadé; Carlos Fernández; Laura Fernández Brites
- Running time: c. 30 min
- Production company: Filmax

Original release
- Network: Filmin
- Release: 4 April 2023

Selftape (stylised as selftape) is a Spanish comedy drama television series created and starred by sisters Joana Vilapuig and Mireia Vilapuig. It premiered on Filmin on 4 April 2023.

== Plot ==
Sisters Joana (Joana Vilapuig) and Mireia (Mireia Vilapuig), teen stars of the hit series Polseres vermelles, met success and fame at a very young age.

Years later, Mireia returns to Barcelona after triumphing as an actress in Oslo. The cold reception from her sister Joana is not what she expected. Unable to communicate and sort things out, everything takes a turn when Mireia is offered a role that Joana was supposed to play.

From this moment on, secrets, lies and traumas from the past come to light, forcing the two sisters to rethink many personal aspects of their lives, such as work, love, friendship and their own relationship.

== Cast ==
- Joana Vilapuig as Joana
- Mireia Vilapuig as Mireia
- Lluís Marquès as Marc
- Marc Ribera as Rubén
- Yolanda Sey as Gina
