= Manuel Sierra Álvarez =

Spanish artist (born 1951)

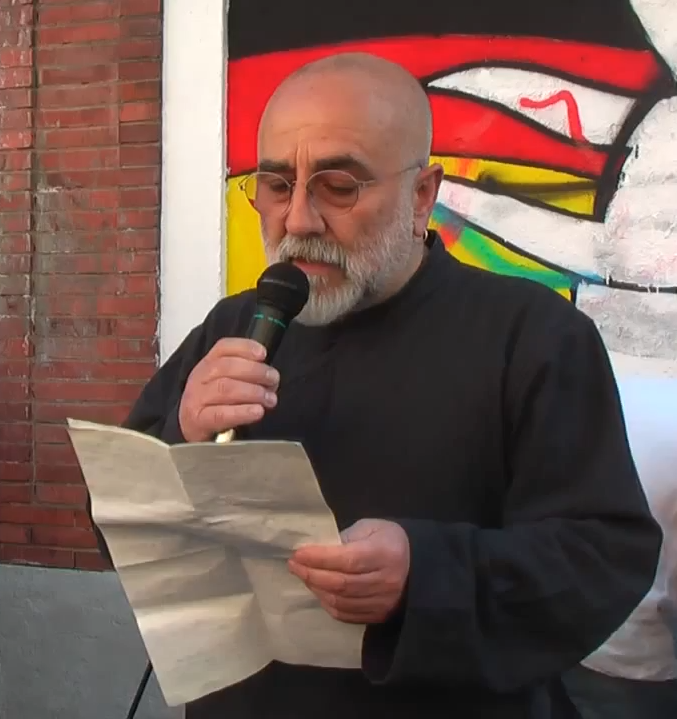
Image of Manuel Sierra

Manuel Sierra Álvarez (Villablino, León; 1951) is a Spanish painter, muralist, poster artist, draftsman, illustrator, and graphic designer. He has also worked as a theatrical set designer and is a frequent editor of engravings, screen prints, and lithographs. He lives and works in his studio in Simancas, Valladolid.

== Paintings ==
Sierra has been painting and drawing since he was 12 years old, but it wasn't until the late 1970s that he decided to dedicate himself exclusively to painting. Since then, he has regularly exhibited in national and international gallery circuits, both private and institutional, periodically showcasing his work at fairs and biennials.

In his work, Sierra uses oil, acrylic, watercolor, wax, and mixed media techniques. The presence of birds is a common theme, both still and in motion, alluding to his republican ideas.

== Bibliography ==
As an author

- 2011- La resistencia de la estética. Las cajas de Manuel Sierra. Gráficas Celarayn, ISBN 978-84-936521-4-2

As an illustrator

- 2011 – La verdadera historia de la humanidad jamás contada ni dibujada, Bermejo Barrera, José Carlos, Sierra Álvarez, Manuel (il.), Foca Ediciones, ISBN 978-84-96797-44-4
- Sobre Sierra
- 2007 – Gavilán, Enrique, El Combate del Centauro. Sociedad, juego y subversión en los carteles de Manuel Sierra, con fotografías de Chusmi, L. Laforga y M. Temprano, Ed. Mata, ISBN 84-611-6569-8.
