= Salve Maria =

2024 Spanish drama film

- Film poster
- Directed by: Mar Coll
- Screenplay by: Mar Coll; Valentina Viso
- Based on: Amek ez dute by Katixa Agirre
- Produced by: Sergi Casamitjana; María Zamora
- Starring: Laura Weissmahr; Oriol Pla
- Cinematography: Nilo Zimmermann
- Edited by: Aina Calleja
- Music by: Zeltia Montes
- Production companies: Escándalo Films; Elastica Films
- Distributed by: Elastica Films
- Release dates: 8 August 2024 (Locarno); 31 October 2024 (Spain)
- Running time: 111 minutes
- Country: Spain
- Languages: Catalan; Spanish

Salve Maria is a 2024 Spanish drama film directed, co-written by Mar Coll starring Laura Weissmahr. Based on the novel Amek ez dute by Basque writer Katixa Agirre, it follows Maria (Weissmahr), a promising young writer and new mother, who becomes obsessed by the case of a woman who drowned her twins in the bathtub. The film competed for Golden Leopard in main competition of 77th Locarno Film Festival and had its world premiere on 8 August 2024. It is mostly shot in Catalan.

== Synopsis ==
Maria, a talented young author and new mother, comes across a disturbing headline: a French woman has drowned her 10-month-old twins in the bathtub. This horrifying event captures Maria's thoughts, turning into an all-consuming fixation. She grapples with the question: Why did the woman commit such an act? From then on, the shadow of infanticide hangs over Maria's existence, haunting her.

== Cast ==
- Laura Weissmahr as Maria Agirre
- Oriol Pla as Nico
- Giannina Fruttero as Ana
- Belén Cruz

== Production ==
Salve Maria marks the return of Mar Coll to the cinema. Produced by Escándalo Films and Elastica Films with the support of ICEC and ICAA, and the participation of RTVE and Movistar Plus+.

Mar Coll talking to Variety about the protagonist said, "María is a repentant mother, an association of words that generates automatic unease".

Filming began in the last week of January 2024 in Barcelona, La Vall de Boí (Lleida Pyrenees) and Tarragona.

== Release ==
Salve Maria premiered on 8 August 2024, as part of the 77th Locarno Film Festival, in Competition. It also made it to the official selection slate of the 69th Valladolid International Film Festival.

The film will be released on 31 October 2024 in theatres by Elastica Films.

== Reception ==
Mariana Hristova reviewing the film at Locarno for Cineuropa indicated that while the script is skillfully written and effectively portrays the protagonist's intense emotions, the focus on symptoms rather than delving into the underlying reasons for the character's emotional breakdown feels superficial. The obvious pressures of personal time constraints and societal expectations related to motherhood are explored, but deeper analysis is lacking.

Jonathan Holland of ScreenDaily described Salve Maria as a film "whose concerns feel totally in tune with the times".

Beatriz Martínez of Fotogramas rated the film 4 out of 5 stars, deeming it to be a "dark, tremendously disturbing, suffocating work that talks about motherhood and postpartum depression in an unprecedented way".

Philipp Engel of Cinemanía rated the film 4 out of 5 stars, declaring it "impeccable in its form".

Carmela López Lobo of La Razón rated the film 4 out of 5 stars, highlighting "Laura Weissmahr's excellent work" and the "deeply unsettling" nature of the film as its best.

Elsa Fernández-Santos of El País wrote that the chilling picture "confronts the viewer with the tragedy of a woman dragged into the repulsion of her own flesh".

== Accolades ==
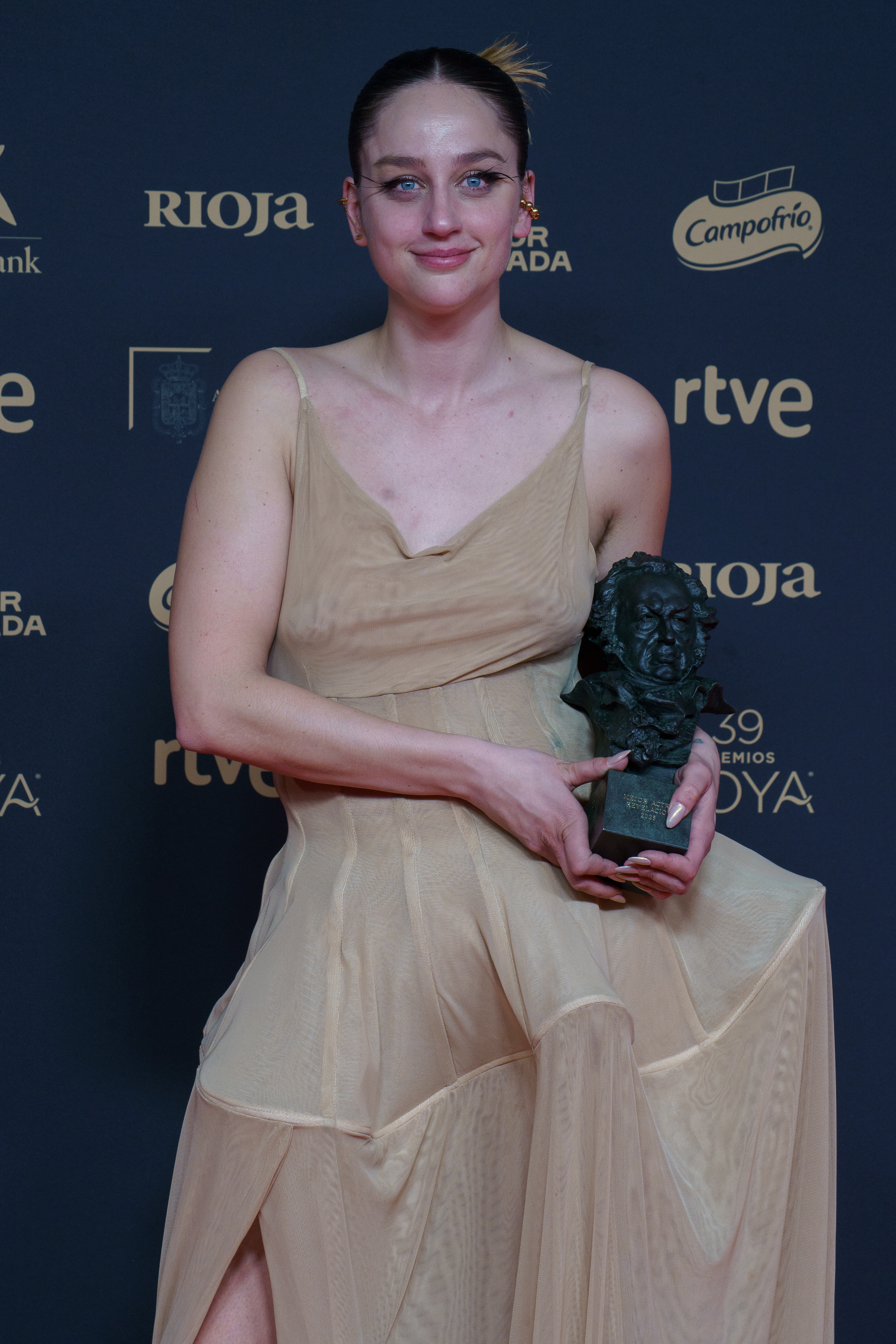
Laura Weissmahr holding her Goya Award for Best New Actress at the 39th Goya Awards in February 2025

Award	Ceremony date	Category	Recipient(s)	Result	Ref.
Locarno Film Festival	17 August 2024	Golden Leopard	Mar Coll	Nominated	
Locarno Film Festival	17 August 2024	Special Mention	Mar Coll	Special Mention	
Valladolid International Film Festival	26 October 2024	Golden Spike	Salve Maria	Nominated	
Valladolid International Film Festival	26 October 2024	Best Actress	Laura Weissmahr	Won	
El Gouna Film Festival	1 November 2024	Best Actress	Laura Weissmahr	Won	
Gaudí Awards	18 January 2025	Best Film	Salve Maria	Nominated	
Gaudí Awards	18 January 2025	Best Adapted Screenplay	Mar Coll, Valentina Viso	Won	
Gaudí Awards	18 January 2025	Best Supporting Actor	Oriol Pla	Nominated	
Gaudí Awards	18 January 2025	Best New Performance	Laura Weissmahr	Won	
Gaudí Awards	18 January 2025	Best Cinematography	Nilo Zimmerman	Nominated	
Gaudí Awards	18 January 2025	Best Original Score	Zeltia Montes	Nominated	
Gaudí Awards	18 January 2025	Best Editing	Aina Calleja	Nominated	
Feroz Awards	25 January 2025	Best Drama Film	Salve Maria	Won	
Feroz Awards	25 January 2025	Best Main Actress in a Film	Laura Weissmahr	Nominated	
Feroz Awards	25 January 2025	Best Film Poster	Octavio Terol, Lluís Tudela	Won	
Feroz Awards	25 January 2025	Best Original Soundtrack	Zeltia Montes	Nominated	
Goya Awards	8 February 2025	Best New Actress	Laura Weissmahr	Won	
Goya Awards	8 February 2025	Best Adapted Screenplay	Mar Coll, Valentina Viso	Nominated	
Actors and Actresses Union Awards	10 March 2025	Best New Actress	Laura Weissmahr	Nominated	
