= Mireia Vilapuig =

Spanish actress

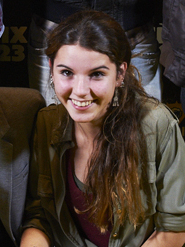
- Born: Mireia Vilapuig Borrell; September 2, 1997 (age 27); Sabadell, Catalonia, Spain
- Occupation: Actress
- Years active: 2010–present

Mireia Vilapuig (born September 2, 1997 in Sabadell, Spain) is a Spanish actress. She is the sister of actress Joana Vilapuig, who in 2011 was one of the protagonists of the successful TV series serie de televisión Polseres vermelles (Pulseras rojas), directed by Pau Freixas and written by Albert Espinosa, and in which Mireia herself has also taken part, in an episodic way.

== Professional career ==
After taking her first steps in the world of acting in amateur theater productions, in 2008 Mireia Vilapuig was selected in a casting with 800 children for a role in the film La cabaña de los héroes, based on a script by Albert Espinosa and Pau Freixas. Before filming began, Mireia and the other four children chosen, all of whom had no previous film experience, lived together for two weeks in a holiday camp to "make their friendship real", according to the film's director, Pau Freixas

The film, finally titled Herois , was shot (in Catalan and Spanish) in the summer of 2009 in various locations in Barcelona, Canyamars (Dosrius, Maresme), Gavà (Baix Llobregat), Palamós (Baix Empordà), the Sau reservoir (Vilanova de Sau) and Sant Pere de Vilamajor (Vallès Oriental). It premiered in April 2010 at the Málaga Spanish Film Festival.

In this piece, the actress shares the leading role with her sister, Joana Vilapuig, and another young Catalan actress, Marina Comas, winner of a Goya Award. The short film was selected to compete in the official section of the XLIV Edition of the Sitges International Fantastic Film Festival, which took place in early October 2011.

Her most notable works have been in the short film El nadador and in the feature film Fènix 11:23, whose shooting, in Catalan and under the direction of Joel Joan, began on November 23, 2011, in the town of Lloret de Mar, (Girona). The film, based on true events, narrates the experience of Eric Bertran, a teenager from Lloret de Mar who in 2004 was accused of terrorism as a result of a series of e-mails he sent to various companies demanding the labeling of products in Catalan. In the film, Mireia Vilapuig plays the girl with whom the protagonist, played by Nil Cardoner, falls in love.

== Filmography ==
=== Feature films ===
- Héroes (2010) by Pau Freixas / Character: Cristo
- Fènix 11:23 (November 9, 2012) by Joel Joan
- Le dernier coup de marteau (2014) Character: Luna

=== Television ===
- Polseres vermelles (Televisió de Catalunya, 2011–2013) / Character: Àlex (episodes 1x11, 1x12, 1x13, 2x11, 2x12, 2x13)
- Cuéntame cómo pasó Season 19 episode 10. Character: Lourdes
- El inocente. Character: Carla Olenverg
- Selftape. Co-creator and co-protagonist.

=== Short films ===
- REM (2011) by Javier Ferreiro and María Sosa Betancor / Character: Eva
- Nadador (2011)
- La muerte dormida (2014)
