= Maria Arnal =

Spanish singer

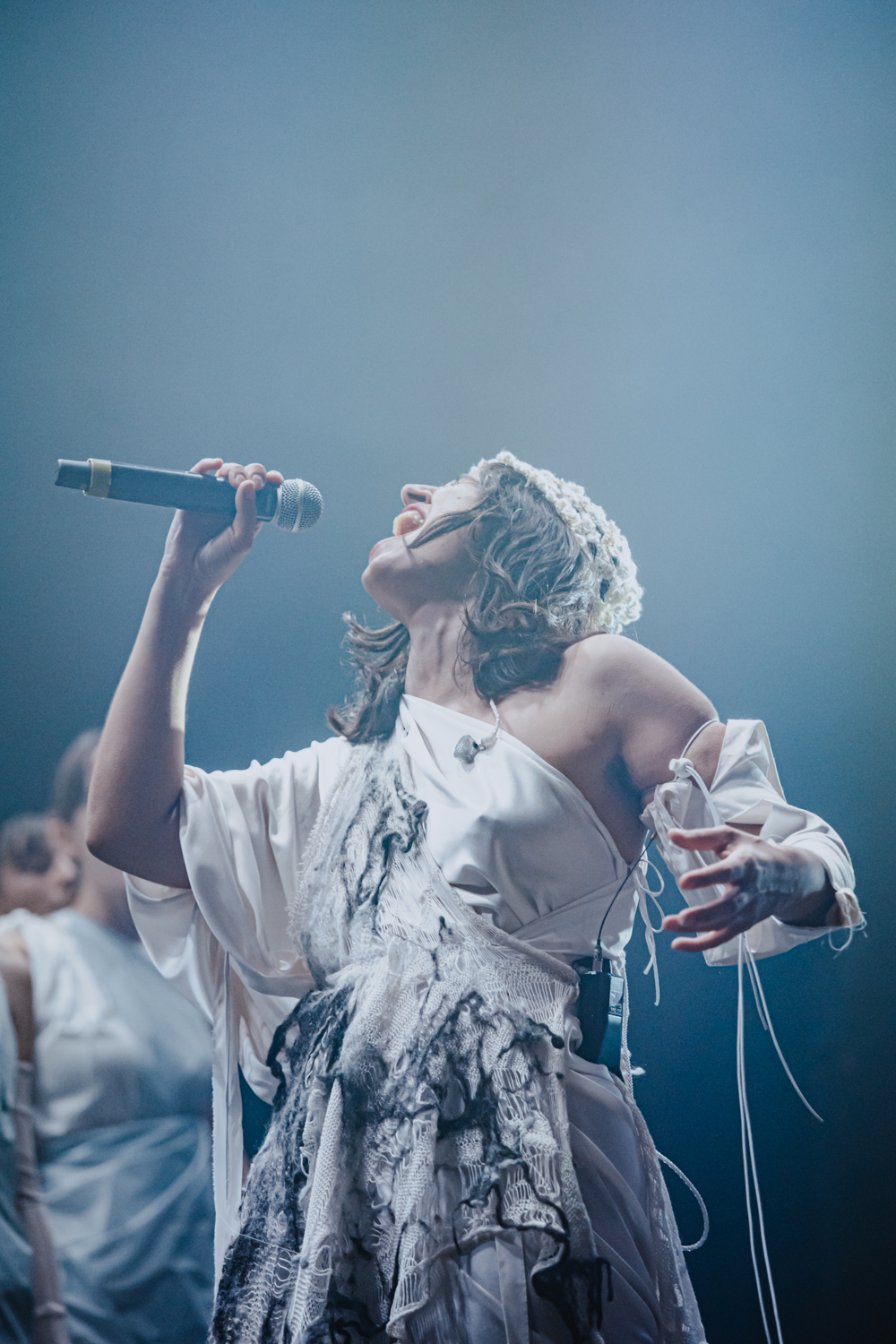
- Arnal in 2022
- Born: Maria Arnal Dimas; 8 February 1987 (age 39); Badalona, Catalonia
- Occupation: Singer
- Years active: 2017―present

Maria Arnal Dimas (born 8 February 1987) is a Spanish artist, singer and composer based in Barcelona. Her music has received great recognition from Spanish critics. She combines facets of electronic pop and polyphonic traditional music with projects that experiment with sound, technology and art.

== Early years ==
She grew up in the city of Badalona. Her parents are elementary and high school teachers. From a very young age, she was interested in music and dance, she participated in school choir competitions. During adolescence she began to play the piano and the guitar, and started composing her first songs. She studied Translation and Interpreting and Literature, studying Japanese and later Italian, French and Portuguese. She lived two years in Lisbon, where she connected with the traditional music of that country. She returned to Barcelona and studied the Performing Arts Master's degree, at the UAB, UPF and Institut del Teatre. For some years she combined works like teaching, with that of an usher at the Teatre Lliure theater, where she acknowledges having seen the same shows so many times that they forged an aesthetic criteria in her. In this theater her leg was broken and during recovery she reconnected with music and singing, discovered the Alan Lomax archive, and decided to start her own musical project. She studied at the Badalona School of Modern Music. She began to take private lessons from his vocal coach Jasmin Martorell. She created a repertoire and started working with musician Marcel Bagés and the label Fina Estampa.

== Career ==
Between 2017 and 2023, she published two albums, with their respective tours, presented different projects that connect music, art and technology, composed several soundtracks, started DJing and composed her next long album.

=== 45 cerebros y 1 corazón (2017) ===
Her debut album, it explores the idea of memory in traditional music. The album, composed with Marcel Bagés and produced by David Soler, received great recognition from Spanish critics: Best Album, Song of the Year, Best Emerging Artist, Best Pop Album, among others. The tour to present this album ends with one hundred and fifty concerts done and she performs on four different continents.

=== Clamor (2021) ===
Her second full length album. Conceptually, it explores the idea of the end of the world, based on current narratives about the climate emergency. Composed with Marcel Bagés and produced by David Soler, with artistic direction by Jose Luis de Vicente, the album has great international collaborations. Following the feature on the Kronos Quartet album “Long time passing: Kronos quartet and friends celebrating Pete Seeger”, Maria proposes a collaboration on the song Jaque. Producer and vanguardist musician Holly Herndon produces El Cant de la Sibil·la, an arrangement of the ancient liturgical drama with synthetic voices generated by Artificial Intelligence.

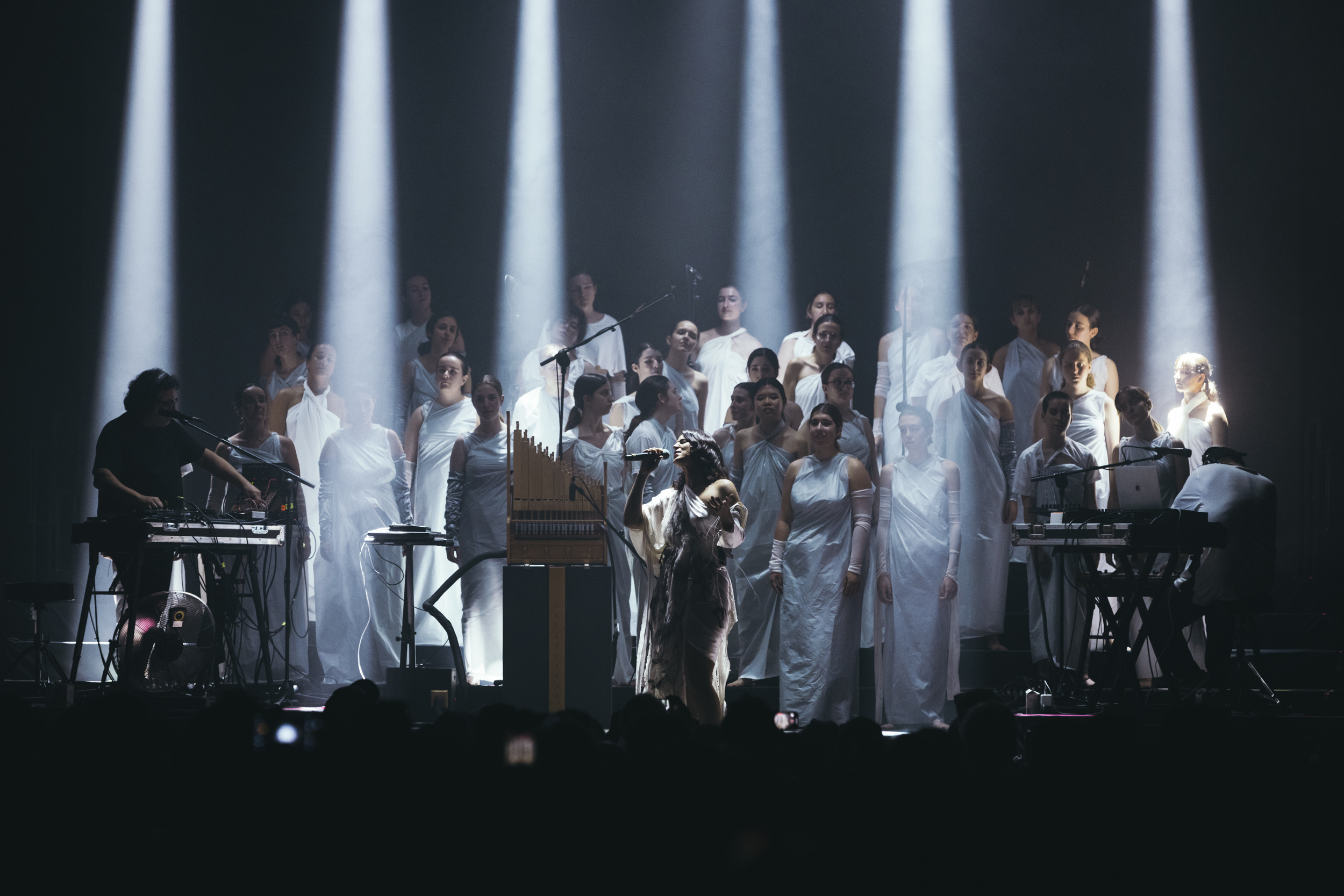

The tour goes through the most important national festivals, with memorable performances and great recognition, such as the SONAR 2022 concert, together with the girls choir of the Orfeó Català.

=== AIRE (Venice Biennale of Architecture, 2021) ===
She creates a sound piece for the Venice Biennale of Architecture, with producer John Talabot, for 45 speakers, on air pollution and the climate emergency. A project curated by Olga Subirós that premieres in Venice in 2021, from which the EP AIRE is published with the Hivern label, 2021.

=== Sirena (2022) ===
Along with producer John Talabot, she composes a generative choral piece that reacts in real time with the big data of the city of Barcelona, which is permanently exhibited at the iconic Torre Glòries, by Jean Nouvel, in Barcelona. It is a piece that reacts to changes in sea temperature, air pollution, or cosmic events such as solstices, among more than 150 variables, and that never repeats itself.

=== Cada capa de l'atmosfera (2023) ===
She directs this sound project together with José Luis de Vicente, produced by the CCCB, which reflects on sound awareness to connect with the climate crisis from new perspectives. She collaborates with international artists, scientists and philosophers such as Suzanne Ciani, Timothy Morthon, among others. The podcast receives great recognition, being nominated twice for the ONDAS 2023 awards.

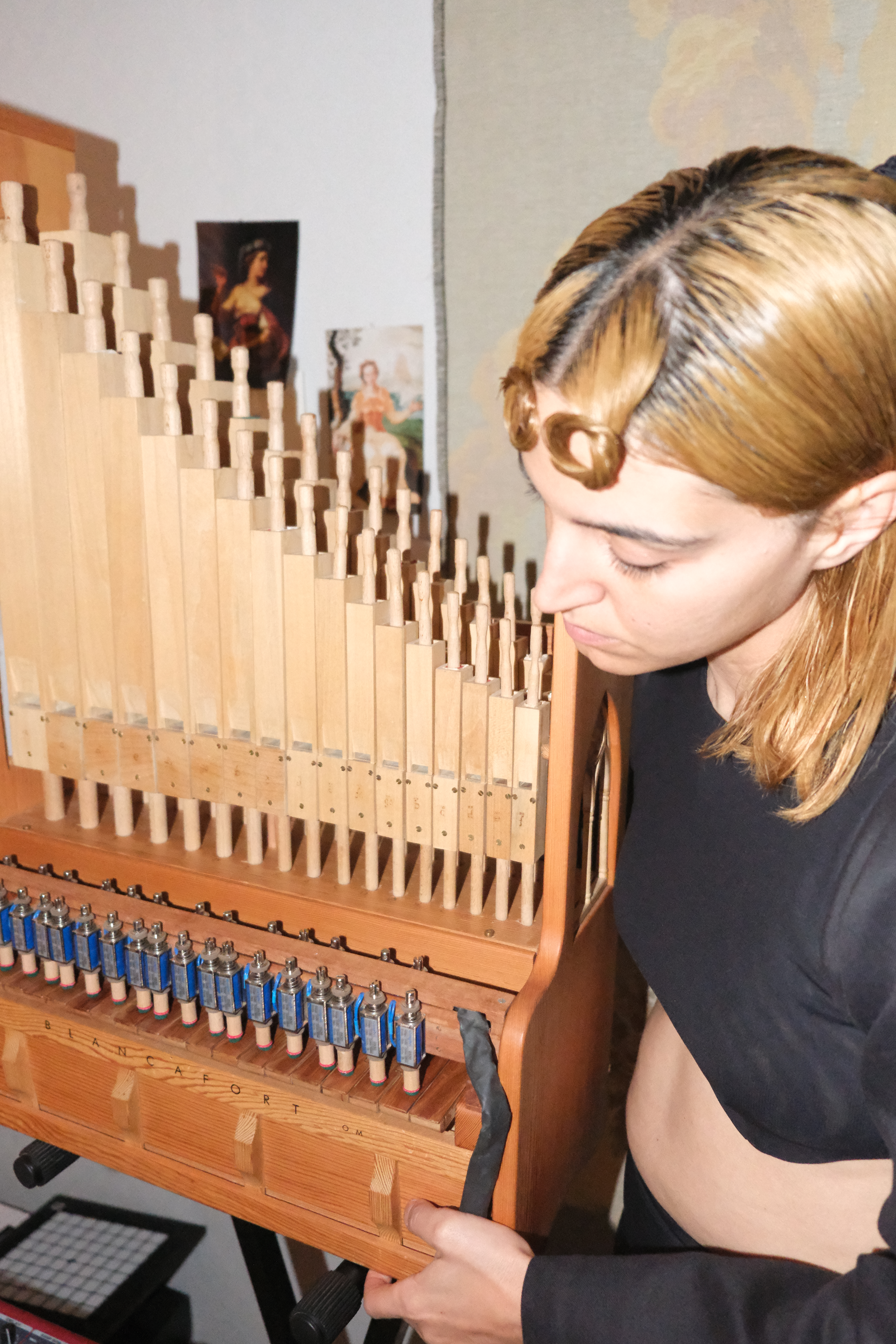

=== La sibil·la del solstici and other projects and collaborations ===
Since 2021 she has directed the show El cant de la Sibil·la celebrated the day of the winter solstice, every year in a different place. In 2021 it was hold in the Oval Room of the National Art Museum of Catalonia, in 2022 in the church of Sant Felip Neri, Barcelona. During 2022 she also collaborates with artists such as Loloysosaku, Fito Conesa,… in art centers and festivals such as the 2023 Science Biennial of Barcelona. She begins to DJ in venues. She composes the soundtrack for the documentary Alteritats, by Alba Cros and Nora Haddad while she works on her next album.

== Awards and recognition ==
- Emerging artist ARC 2017
- Artist of the year The Creative Awards 2018
- Ciutat de Barcelona Awards 2017
- Best artist Altaveu Awards 2018
- Best National Album Award MIN Awards 2018
- Ojo Crítico Award 2018
- MIN Awards 2018
- Revelation Artist MIN Awards 2018
- Best Pop Album 2018 MIN Awards
- Best National Song of the Independent Music Awards 2018
- Best Record of the Year for Mondosonoro 2018
- Best Live of the Year MIN Awards 2022
- Ruido Awards for Best Record of the Year 2021
- Best performance Alícia Awards 2022
- Nomination for two Ondas podcast awards for Cada capa de l’atmosfera (2023)

== Discography ==
- 45 cerebros y 1 corazón (LP, 2017)
- CLAMOR (LP, 2021)
