= Laura Weissmahr =

Spanish actress

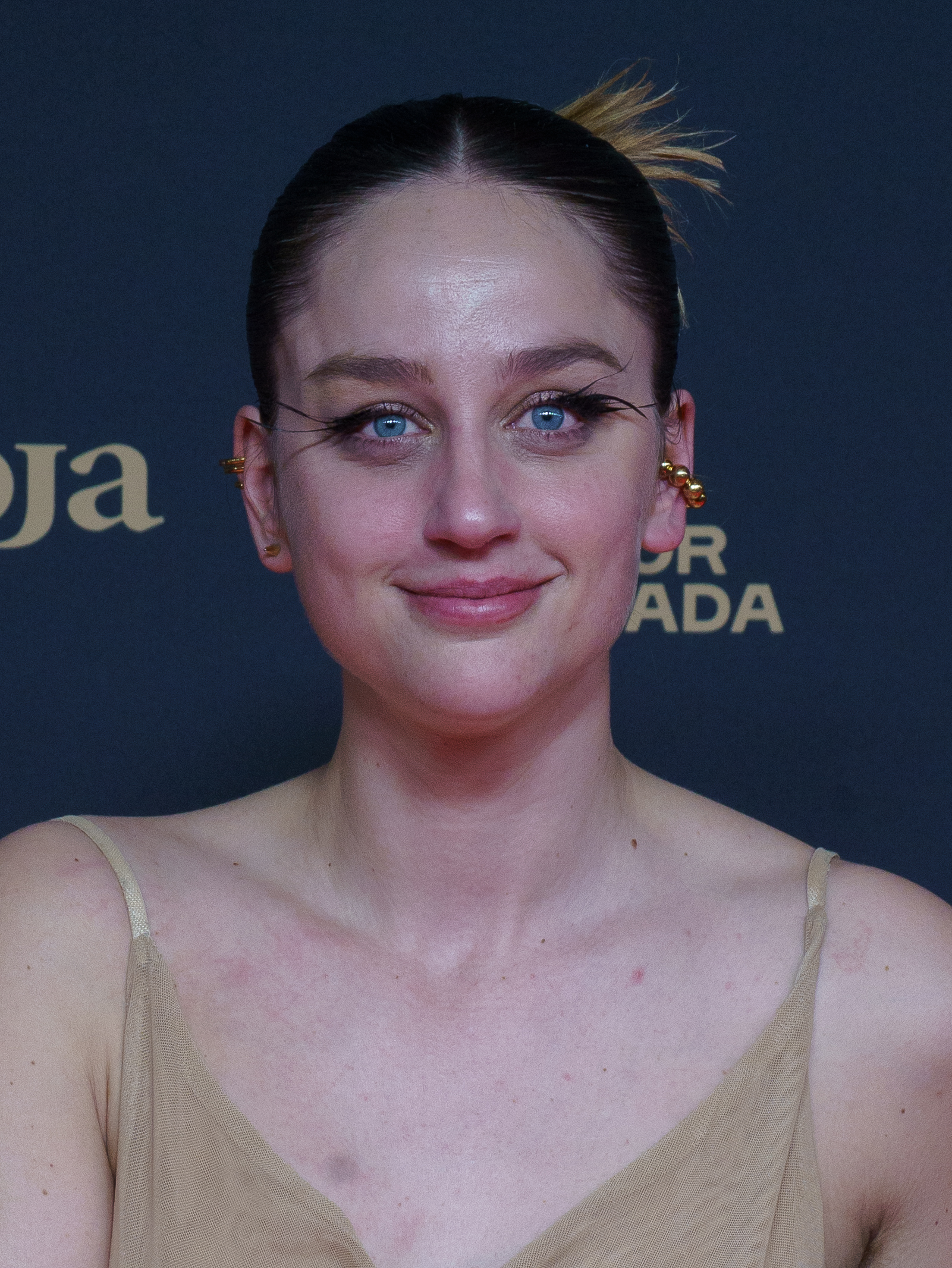
- Weissmahr in 2025
- Born: 1992 (age 33–34); Tarifa, Spain
- Occupations: Stage and film actress

Laura Weissmahr (born 1992) is an actress from Spain. She won the Goya Award for Best New Actress for her leading role in the psychological drama Salve Maria (2024).

== Early life ==
Weissmahr was born in Tarifa to an Italian mother and a Swiss father. After living for a while in Switzerland and the United States, she moved to Barcelona at age 12. She studied acting at Escola d'Arts Dramàtiques Eolia in Barcelona, and graduated on Film and Television Production from the University of Westminster, United Kingdom.

== Career ==
Weissmahr worked on documentaries, directed several short films, in 2017 she made her debut in Júlia Ist, by Elena Martín Gimeno, and in 2020 it was released The Offering, alongside Àlex Brendemühl and Verónica Echegui, and Cross the Line, by David Victori alongside Mario Casas. She performed Baby no more (2014), Like si lloras (2017), ¡Únete! Join Us! (2017) alongside Jordi Colomer, Wohnwagen (2018), and The Spanish Coast (2018). She created Pussy Picnic ( 2019), co-directed Arcas 2020 (2021–22), and Falseftuff. La muerte de las musas (2023).

In 2021 she appeared in the videoclip Perra, by Rigoberta Bandini. In 2024 she appeared in Breaking Walls, by Borja Cobeaga, and she was the main character in Salve Maria, by Mar Coll, for which she won several awards like the Gaudí Award for Best New Performance 2025.

== Filmography ==
Key
†	Denotes films that have not yet been released

=== Film ===
Year	Title	Role	Notes	Ref.
2017	Júlia Ist	Fanny	Feature film debut	
2020	L'ofrena (The Offering)			
2020	No matarás (Cross the Line)			
2024	Salve Maria	Maria		
2025	Los aitas (Breaking Walls)	Nina		
2026	Yo no moriré de amor (I Won't Die for Love)	Inés		
TBA	La muerte de Drácula †	Mina		

=== Television ===
- Vida perfecta (2019, Movistar+) 2 episodes.
- Drama (2020, RTVE Playz) 2 episodes
- Fanático (2022, Netflix) 4 episodes
- La Ruta (2022, Atresplayer) 2 episodes
- Cardo (2021, Atresplayer)
- Rafaela y su loco mundo (2026, Atresplayer)
- Se tiene que morir mucha gente (2026, Movistar Plus+)

== Awards ==
- Seminci Award for Best Actress in 2024 for Salve María.
- Gaudí Award for Revelation Cast in 2025 for Salve María.
- Sant Jordi Award for Best Spanish Actress in 2025 for Salve María.
- Goya Award for Best New Actress in 2025 for Salve María.
