= 39th Goya Awards =

Spanish film awards

- Date: 8 February 2025
- Site: Granada Conference & Exhibition Centre, Granada, Spain
- Hosted by: Maribel Verdú; Leonor Watling
- Organized by: Academy of Cinematographic Arts and Sciences of Spain

Highlights
- Best Film: The 47 & Undercover
- Best Direction: Isaki Lacuesta, Pol Rodríguez; Saturn Return
- Best Actor: Eduard Fernández; Marco, the Invented Truth
- Best Actress: Carolina Yuste; Undercover
- Most awards: The 47 (5)
- Most nominations: The 47 (14)

Television coverage
- Network: La 1, RTVE Play
- Viewership: 2.34 million (24.4%)

The 39th Goya Awards ceremony, presented by the Academy of Cinematographic Arts and Sciences of Spain, took place at the Granada Conference & Exhibition Centre in Granada, Andalusia, on 8 February 2025. The gala was broadcast on La 1 and RTVE Play.

== Background ==
Regarding the modifications of the awards regulations for the 39th edition, an increase up to a maximum of two submissions per country in the Best European Film category was allowed. The Best New Actor and New Actress categories added a requirement consisting of an authorization signed by the candidate accepting their participation in the Goya Awards. AI-generated compositions were explicitly banned from the Best Original Score and the Best Original Song categories.

On 22 October 2024, the Spanish Film Academy presented the 17 submissions for the Goya Award for Best Ibero-American Film:

Aire: Just Breathe (Dominican Republic), I'm Still Here (Brazil), Chuzalongo (Ecuador), The Dog Thief (Bolivia), Don't You Let Me Go (Uruguay), Kill the Jockey (Argentina), In Her Place (Chile), The Buriti Flower (Portugal), La mujer salvaje (Cuba), La suprema (Colombia), Los últimos (Paraguay), Memories of a Burning Body (Costa Rica), Niños de las brisas (Venezuela), Rita (Guatemala), Sujo (México), Wake Up Mom (Panama), and Yana-Wara (Peru).

On 8 November 2024, the Spanish Film Academy presented the 21 submissions for the Goya Award for Best European Film (now allowing up to two submissions per country in the category):

Wer hat Angst vor Braunau? (Austria), Omen and Holly (Belgium), Beautiful Evening, Beautiful Day (Croatia), Dog on Trial and Reinas (Switzerland), The Count of Monte Cristo and Emilia Pérez (France), Flow (Latvia), Grand Tour and O vento assobiando nas gruas (Portugal), Hesitation Wound and Dormitory (Turkey), In the Blind Spot (Germany), Kensuke's Kingdom and Marianengraben (Luxembourg), La chimera and Palazzina Laf (Italy), The Zone of Interest (United Kingdom), and When the Light Breaks and Touch (Iceland).

On 13 November 2024, the Spanish Film Academy announced Maribel Verdú and Leonor Watling as the gala hosts.

The nominations were read in Granada by Natalia de Molina and Álvaro Cervantes on 18 December 2024. Alejandro Sanz, Amaral, Dora, Rigoberta Bandini, Zahara, Miguel Ríos, Dellafuente, the Morente siblings (Estrella, Kiki, and Soleá), and Lola Índigo were announced as musical acts.

== Winners and nominees ==
The winners and nominees are listed as follows:

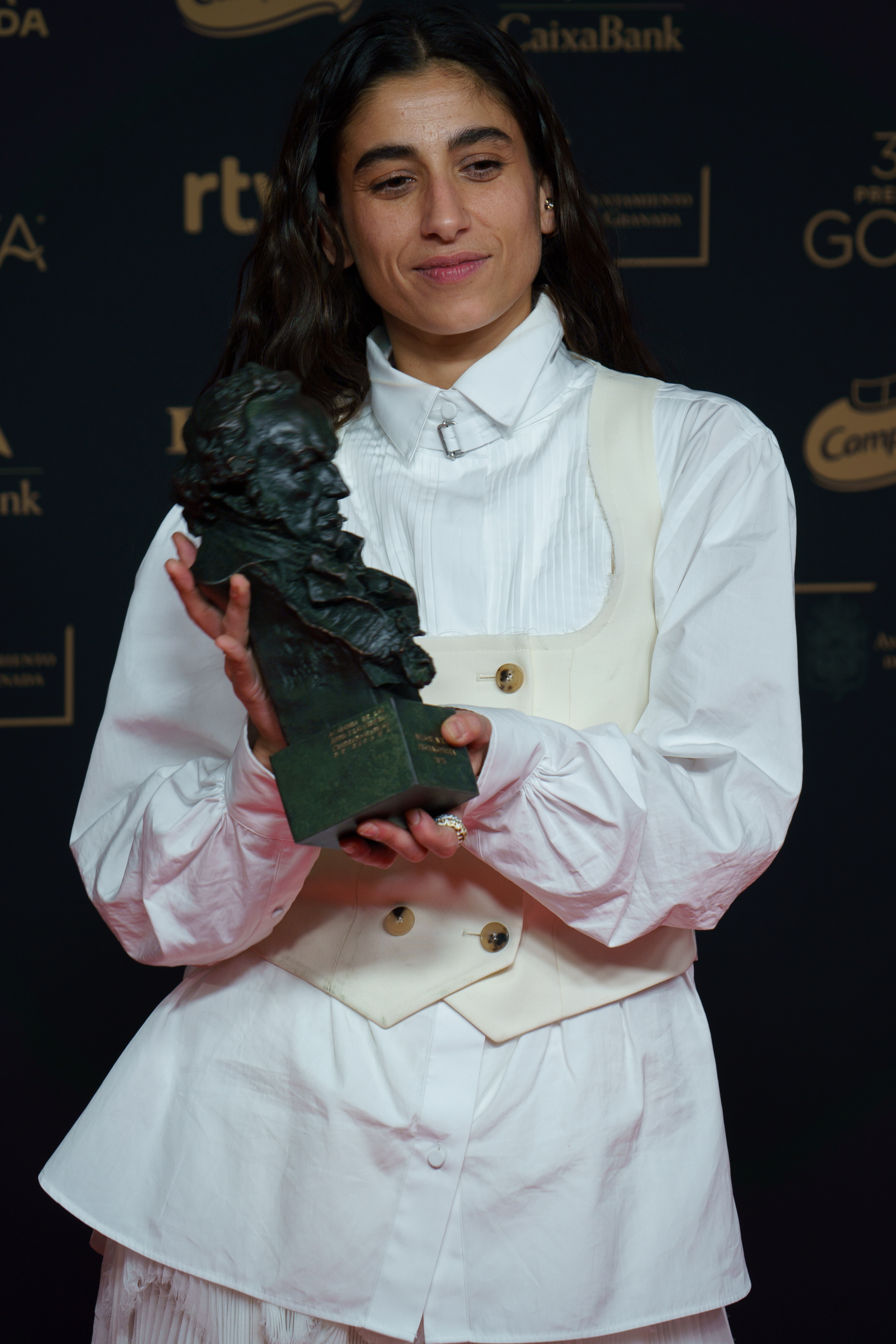
Carolina Yuste, Best Actress winner

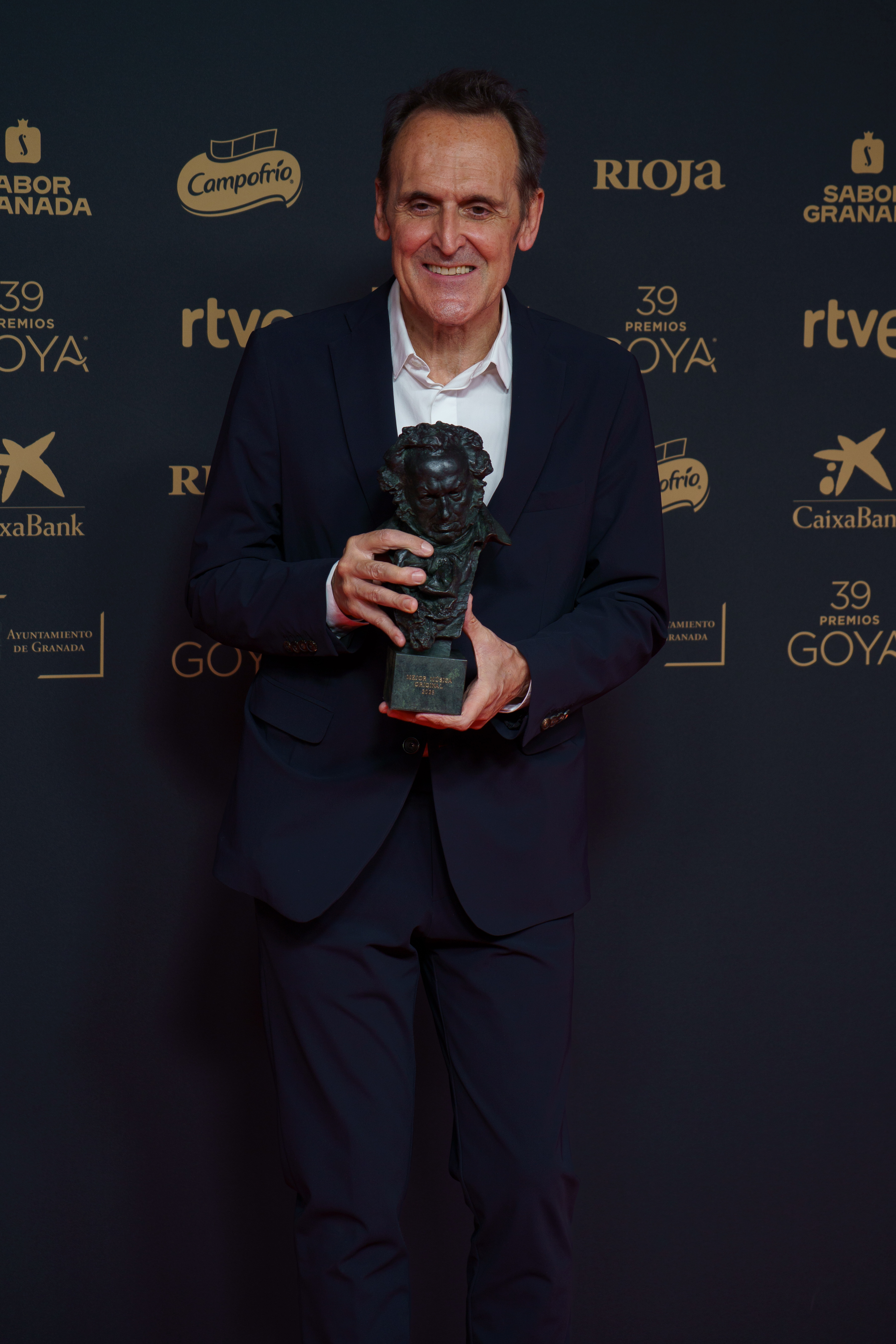
Alberto Iglesias, Best Original Score winner

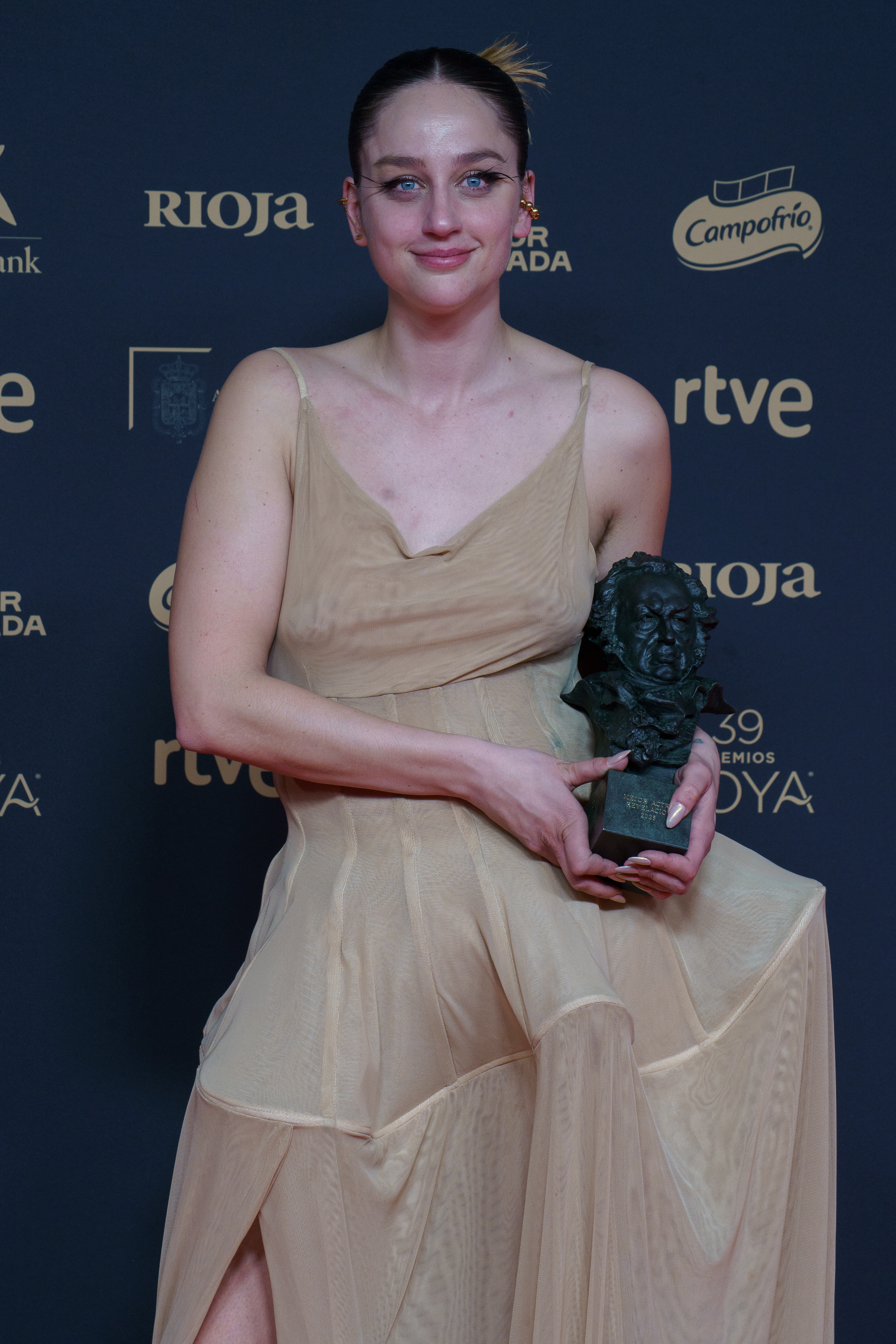
Laura Weissmahr, Best New Actress winner

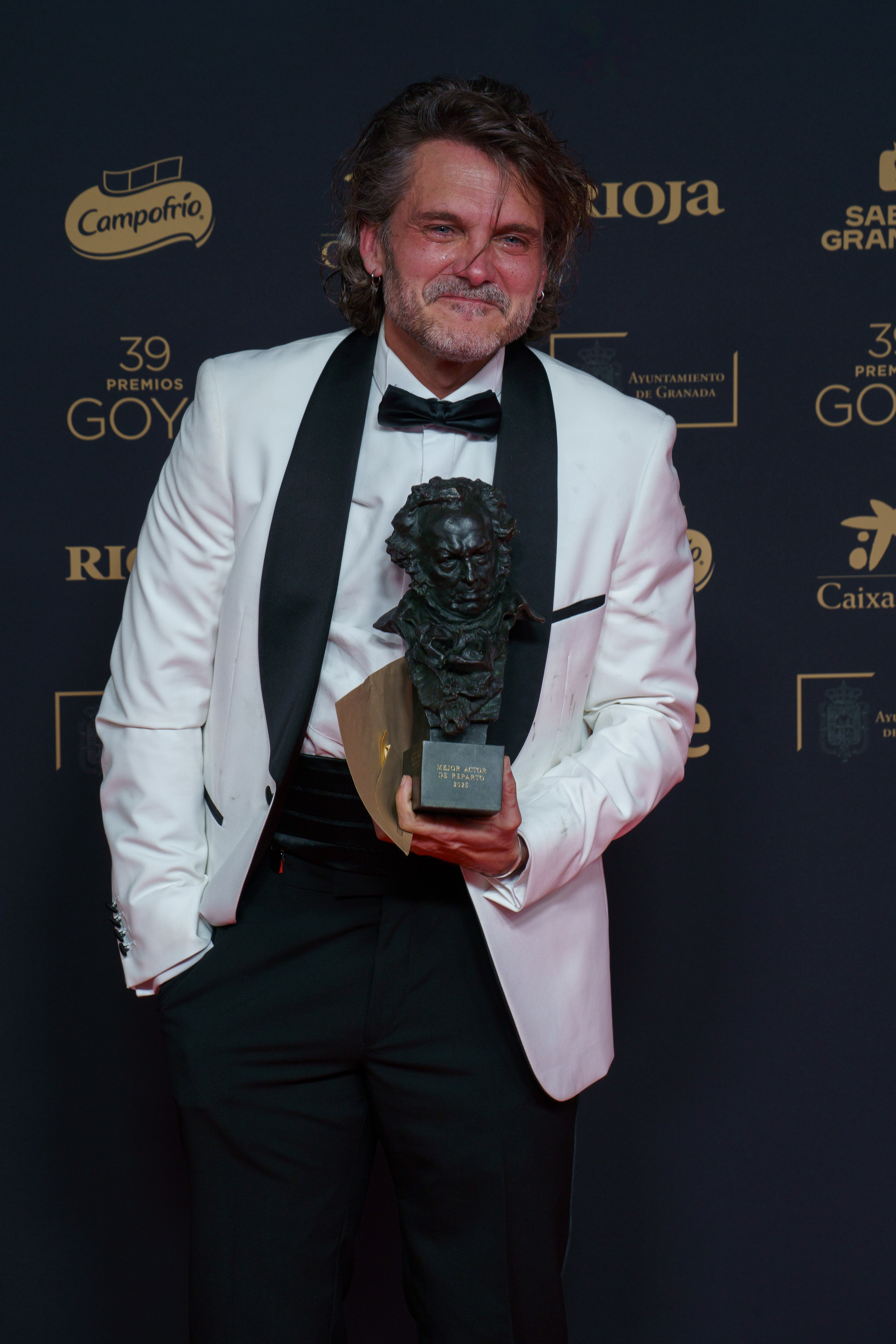
Salva Reina, Best Supporting Actor winner

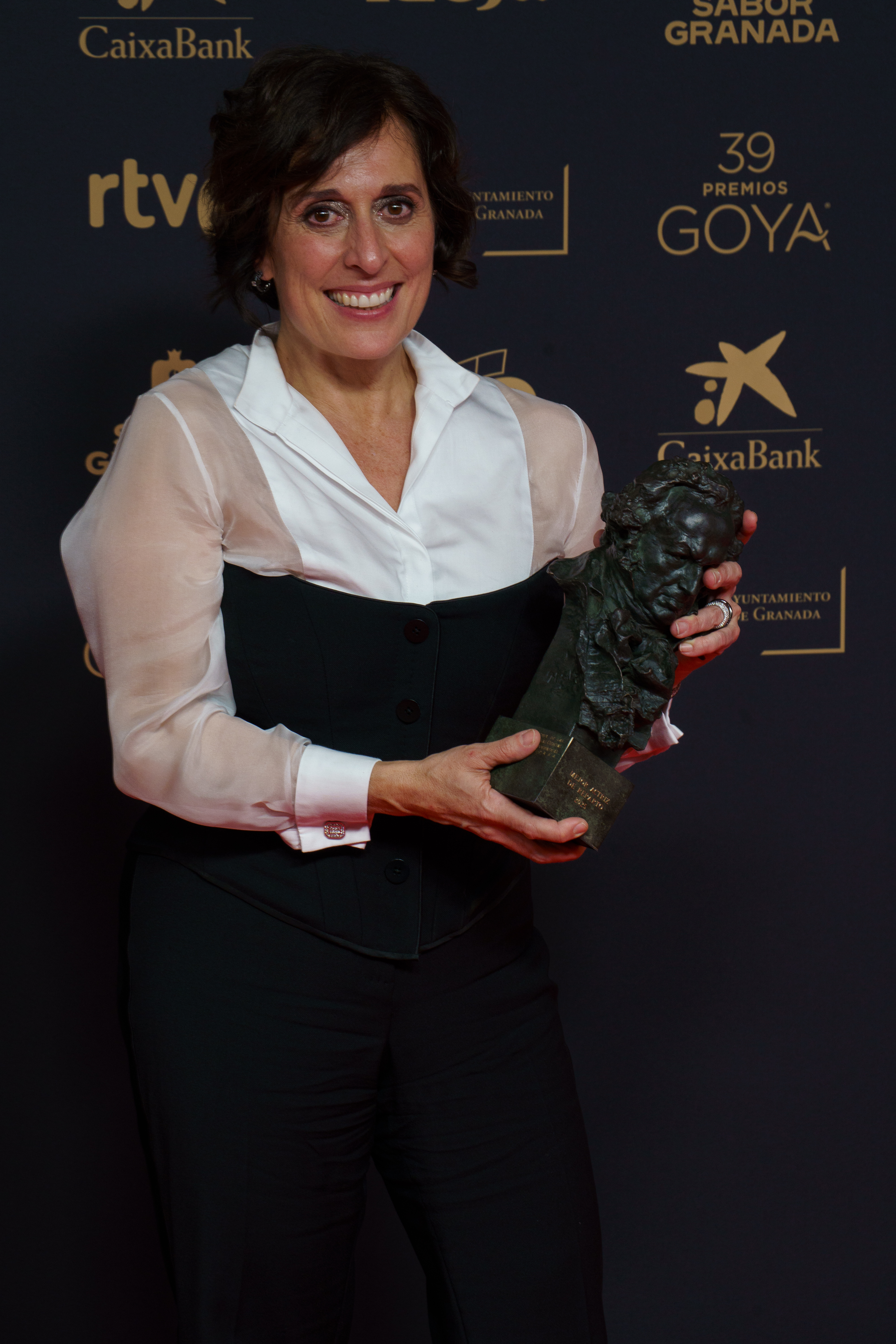
Clara Segura, Best Supporting Actress winner

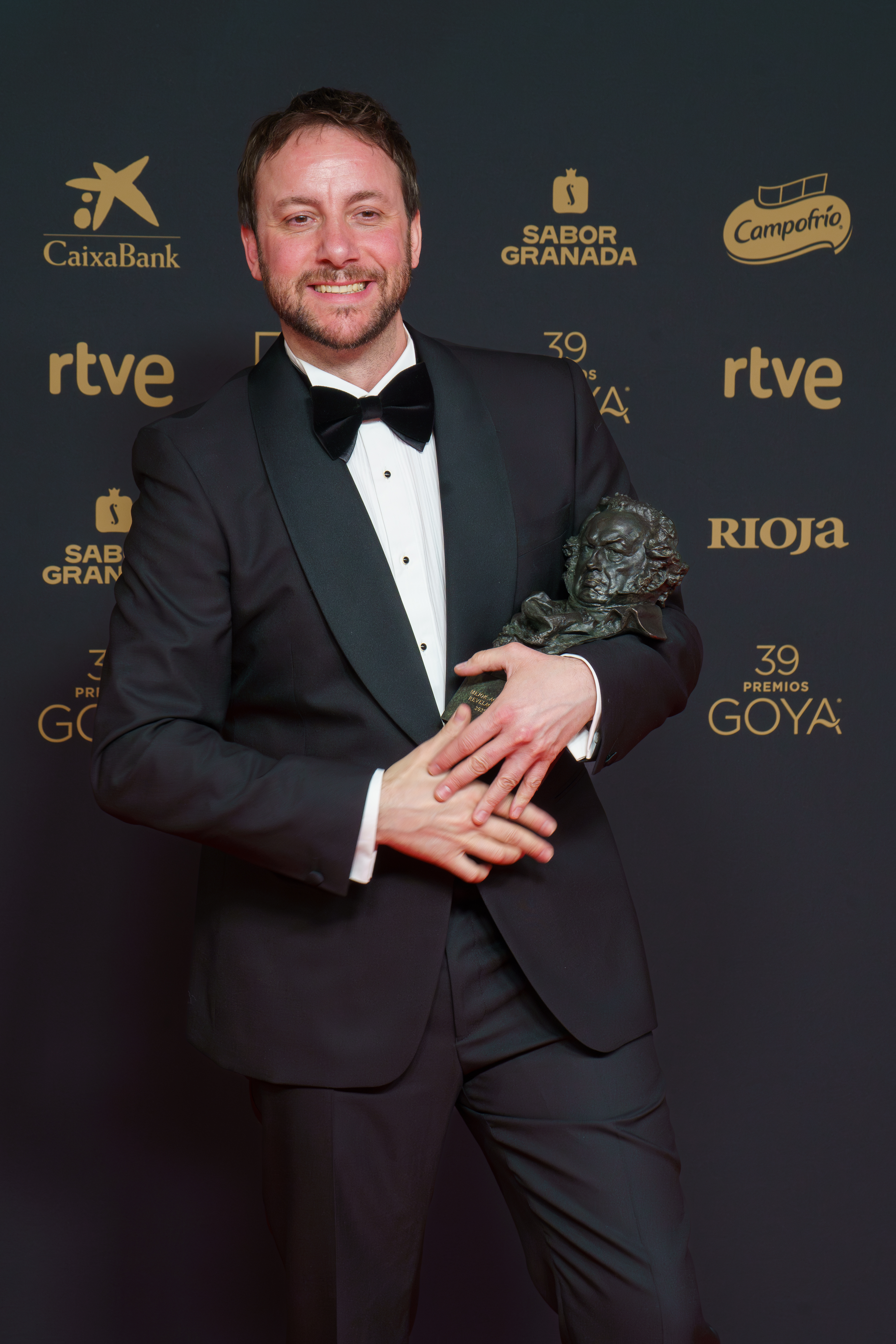
Pepe Lorente, Best New Actor winner

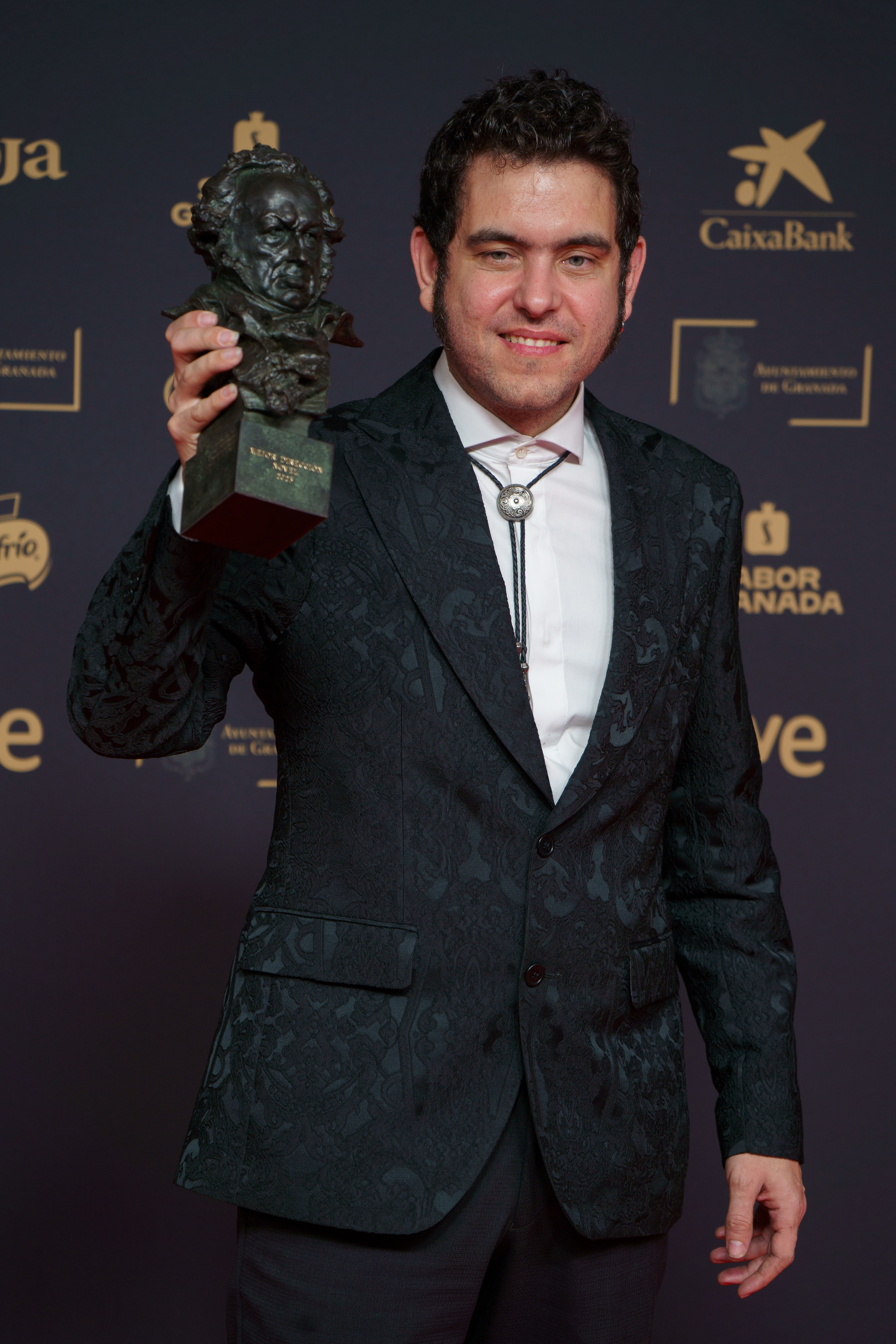
Javier Macipe, Best New Director winner

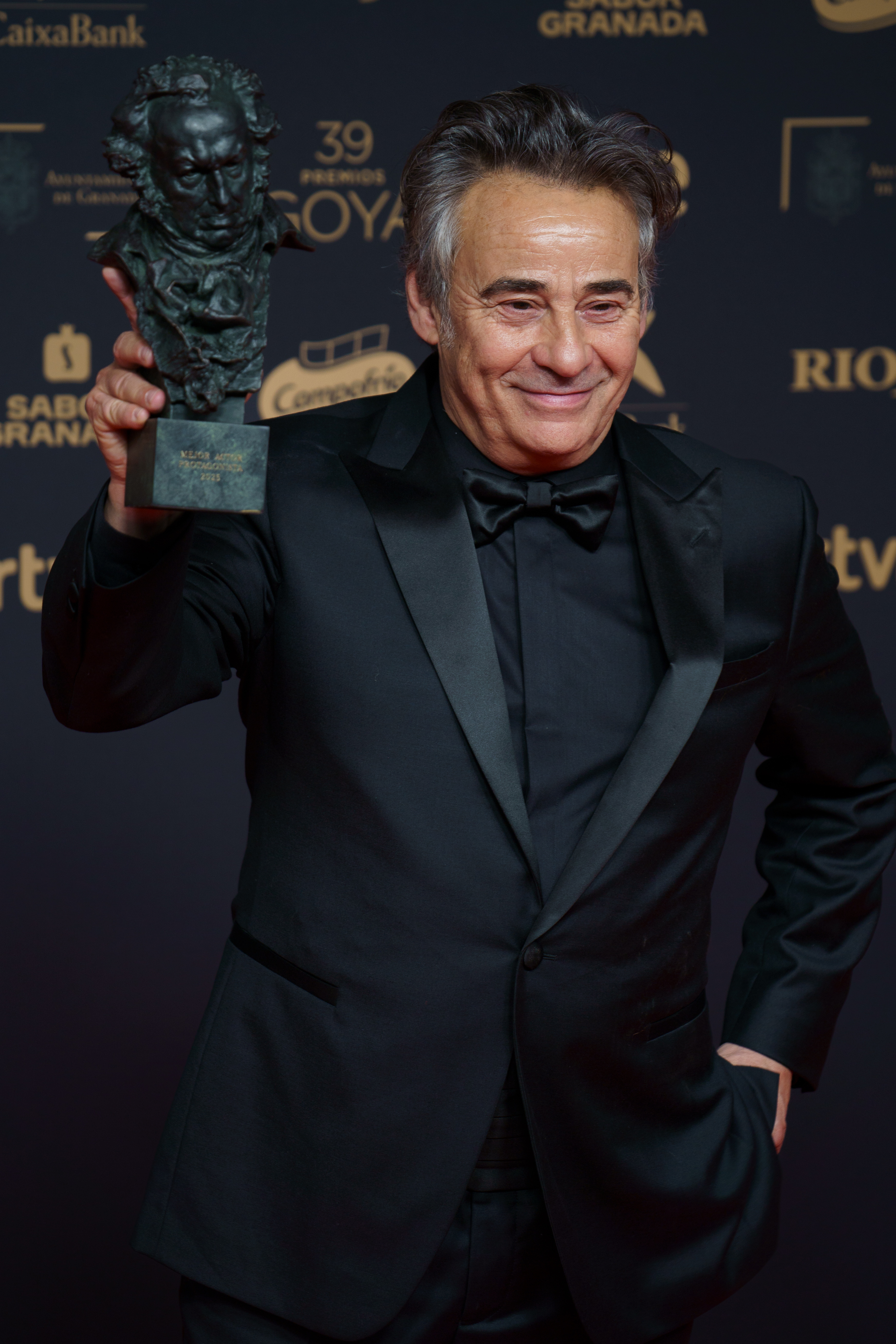
Eduard Fernández, Best Actor winner

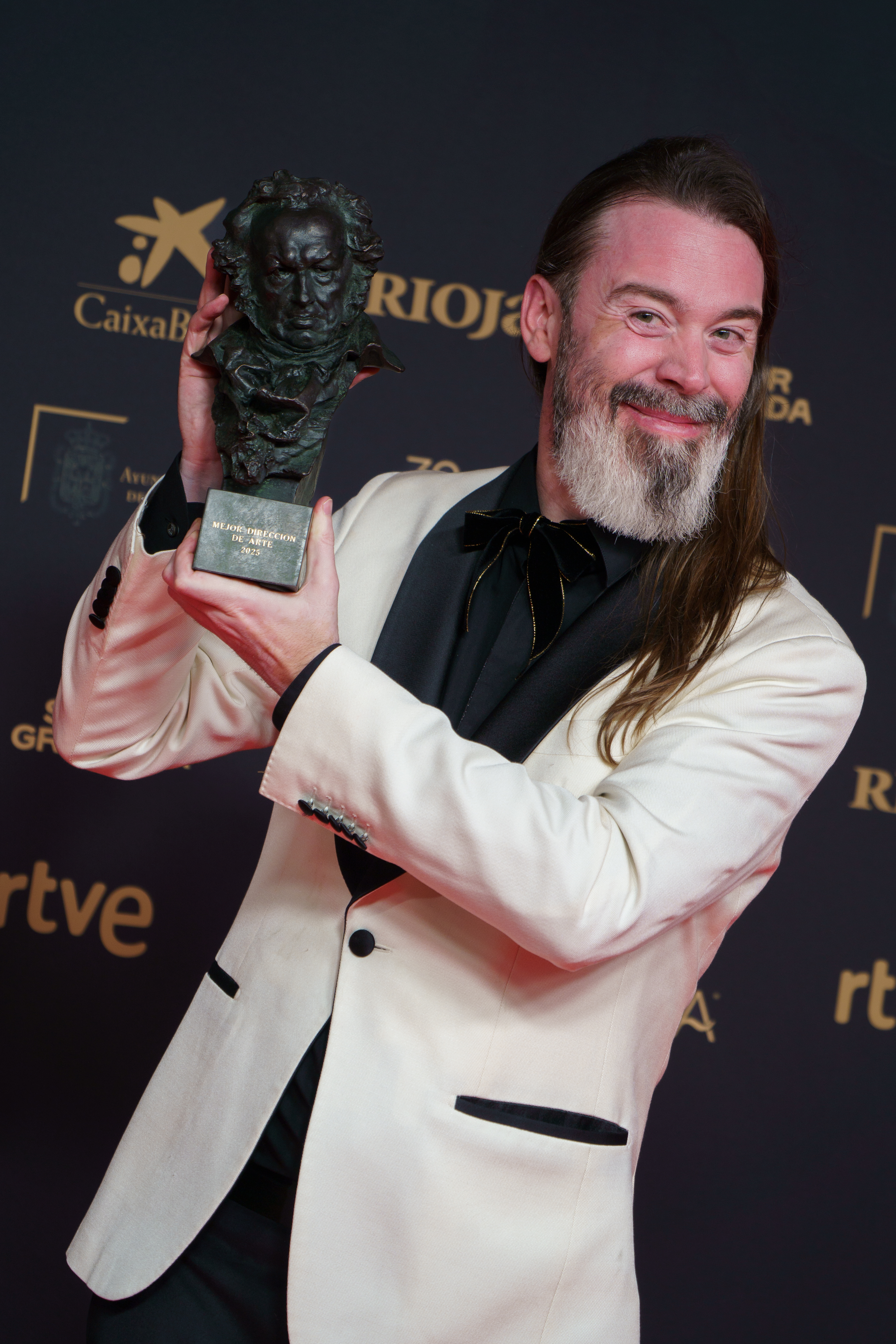
Javier Alvariño, Best Art Direction winner

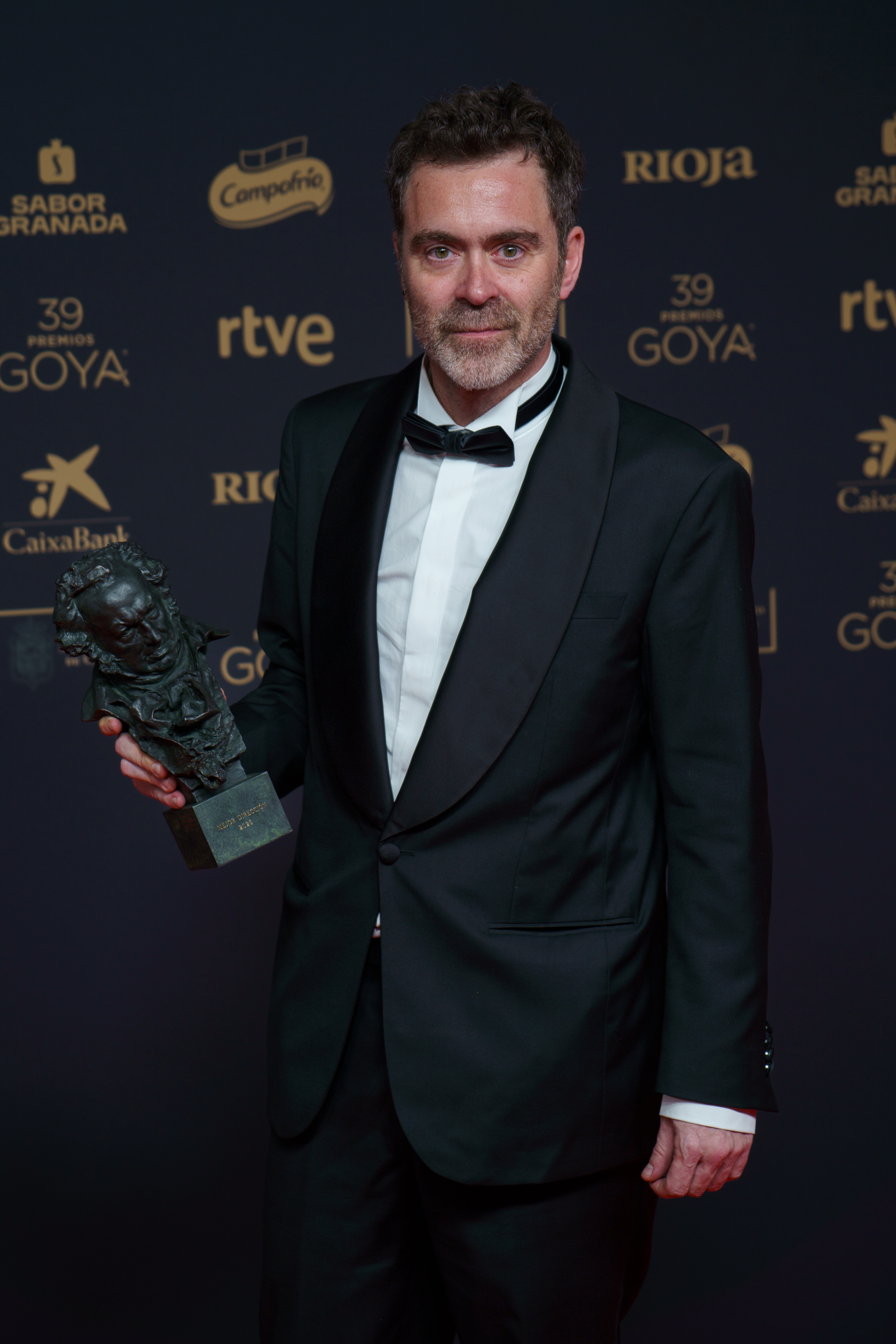
Pol Rodríguez, Best Director winner

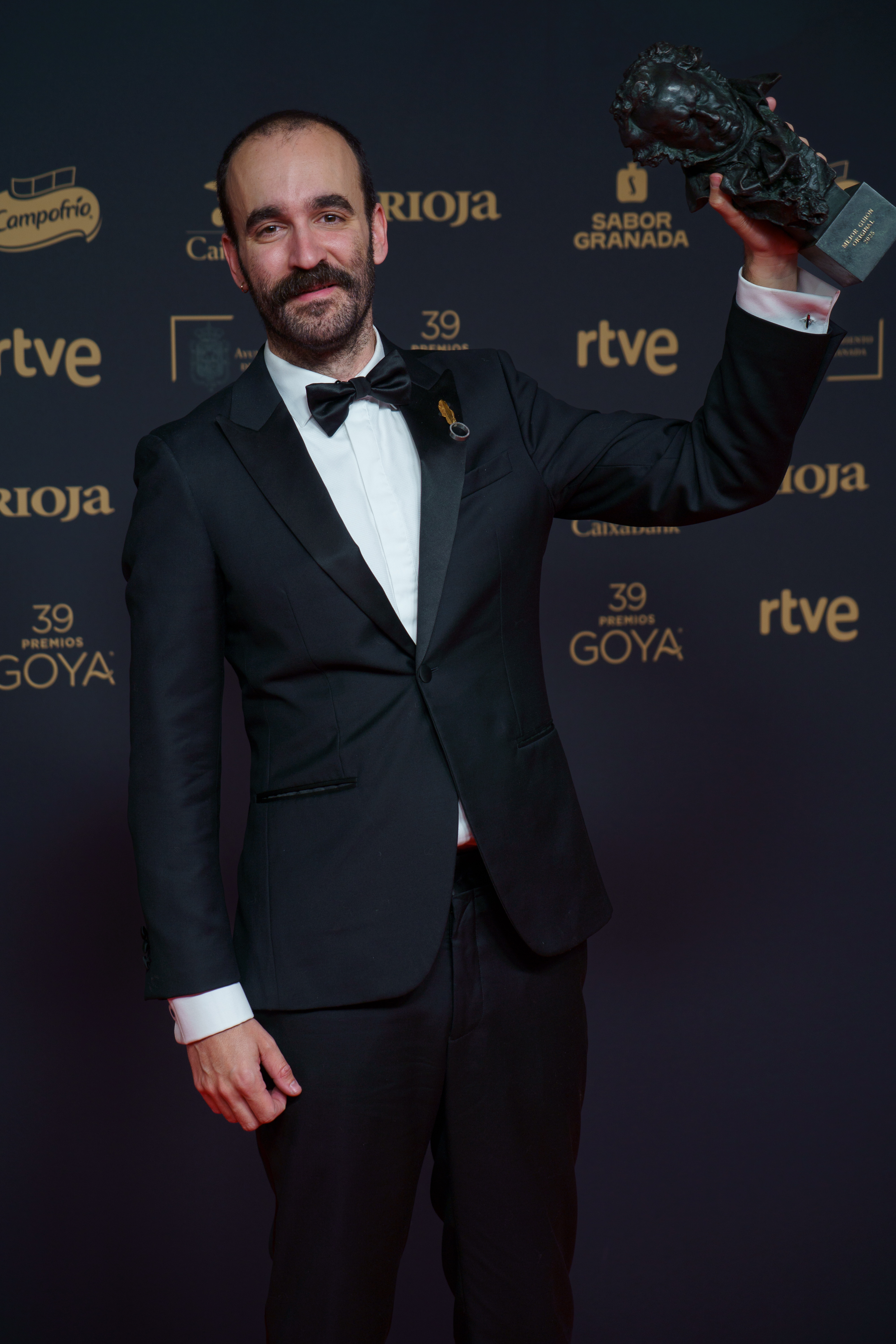
Eduard Sola, Best Original Screenplay winner

Best Film: The 47; produced by Javier Méndez, Laura Fernández Espeso; Undercover; produced by Álvaro Ariza, María Luisa Gutiérrez, Mercedes Gamero, Pablo Nogueroles; A House on Fire; produced by Alberto Aranda, Ana Eiras, Ariens Damsí, Bernat Saumell, Dani de la Orden, Jaime Ortiz de Artiñano, Kike Maíllo, Toni Carrizosa; The Blue Star; produced by Amelia Hernández, Hernán Musaluppi, Simón de Santiago; Saturn Return; produced by Cristóbal García	Best Director: Isaki Lacuesta, Pol Rodríguez — Saturn Return; Pedro Almodóvar — The Room Next Door; Arantxa Echevarría — Undercover; Paula Ortiz — The Red Virgin; Aitor Arregi, Jon Garaño — Marco, the Invented Truth
Best Actor: Eduard Fernández — Marco, the Invented Truth as Enric Marco; Alberto San Juan — A House on Fire as Carlos; Alfredo Castro — They Will Be Dust as Flavio; Urko Olazabal — I'm Nevenka as Ismael Álvarez; Vito Sanz — The Other Way Around as Alex	Best Actress: Carolina Yuste — Undercover as Mónica / Arantxa; Emma Vilarasau — A House on Fire as Montse; Julianne Moore — The Room Next Door as Ingrid Parker; Tilda Swinton — The Room Next Door as Martha Hunt; Patricia López Arnaiz — Glimmers as Isabel
Best Supporting Actor: Salva Reina — The 47 as Felipín; Enric Auquer — A House on Fire as David; Óscar de la Fuente — La casa as Vicente; Luis Tosar — Undercover as Ángel Salcedo "El Inhumano"; Antonio de la Torre — Glimmers as Ramón	Best Supporting Actress: Clara Segura — The 47 as Carmen; Macarena García — A House on Fire as Marta; Maria Rodríguez Soto — A House on Fire as Júlia; Nausicaa Bonnín — Undercover as Andrea; Aixa Villagrán — The Red Virgin as Macarena
Best New Actor: Pepe Lorente — The Blue Star as Mauricio Aznar; Óscar Lasarte — May I Speak with the Enemy? as Miguel Gila; Cuti Carabajal — The Blue Star as Carlos Carabajal; Cristalino — Saturn Return as the guitarist; Daniel Ibáñez — Saturn Return as the singer	Best New Actress: Laura Weissmahr — Salve Maria as Maria Agirre; Zoe Bonafonte — The 47 as Joana; Mariela Carabajal — The Blue Star as Andrea Carabajal; Marina Guerola — Glimmers as Madalen; Lucía Veiga — I'm Nevenka as Charo Velasco
Best Original Screenplay: Eduard Sola — A House on Fire; Alberto Marini, Marcel Barrena — The 47; Javier Macipe — The Blue Star; Amèlia Mora, Arantxa Echevarría — Undercover; Aitor Arregi, Jon Garaño, Jorge Gil Munarriz, Jose Mari Goenaga — Marco, the Invented Truth	Best Adapted Screenplay: Pedro Almodóvar — The Room Next Door; based on the novel What Are You Going Through by Sigrid Nunez; Álex Montoya, Joana M. Ortueta — La casa; based on the graphic novel by Paco Roca; Pilar Palomero — Glimmers; based on the story Bihotz handiegia by Eider Rodríguez; Mar Coll, Valentina Viso — Salve Maria; based on the novel Amek ez dute by Katixa Agirre; Icíar Bollaín, Isa Campo — I'm Nevenka; based on the books Hay algo que no es como me dicen: el caso Nevenka Fernández contra la realidad by Juan José Millás and El poder de la verdad by Nevenka Fernández
Best Ibero-American Film: I'm Still Here · Brazil; Don't You Let Me Go · Uruguay; Kill the Jockey · Argentina; In Her Place · Chile; Memories of a Burning Body · Costa Rica	Best European Film: Emilia Pérez · France; The Count of Monte Cristo · France; Flow · Latvia; La chimera · Italy; The Zone of Interest · United Kingdom
Best New Director: Javier Macipe — The Blue Star; Miguel Faus — The Quiet Maid; Pedro Martín-Calero — The Wailing; Sandra Romero — As Silence Passes By; Paz Vega — Rita	Best Animated Film: Black Butterflies; produced by César Zelada, David Baute, Edmon Roch, Marc Sabé; Buffalo Kids; produced by Cleber Beretta, Francisco Celma, Ignacio Salazar-Simpson, Jaime Ortiz de Artiñano, Jordi Gasull, Juan Jesús García Galocha "Galo", Marc Sabé, Pedro Solís, Ricardo Marco Budé, Toni Novella; Dragonkeeper; produced by Aurora de Cos, Fu Ruoqing, Larry Levene, Li Jiangping, Pedro Pérez, Peng Mingyu, Salvador Simó, Song Weiwei, Tro Juanyu, Yang Lihe; Rock Bottom; produced by Adán Aliaga, Alba Sotorra, Anna Mroczek, Dani Bagur, Kiko Domínguez, Lukasz Kacprowicz, Marcin Wasilewski, María Trénor, Miguel Molina Carmona, Robert Jaszczurowski, Wojciech Leszczynski; Superklaus; produced by Andrea Sebastiá, Darío Sanchez, François Trudel, Nacho La Casa, Steven Majaury
Best Cinematography: Edu Grau — The Room Next Door; Isaac Vila — The 47; Javier Salmones — Undercover; Takuro Takeuchi — Saturn Return; Gris Jordana — I'm Nevenka	Best Editing: Javi Frutos — Saturn Return; Nacho Ruiz Capillas — The 47; Javier Macipe, Nacho Blasco — The Blue Star; Victoria Lammers — Undercover; Fernando Franco — Little Loves
Best Art Direction: Javier Alvariño — The Red Virgin; Marta Bazaco — The 47; Inbal Weinberg — The Room Next Door; Pepe Domínguez del Olmo — Saturn Return; Miguel Ángel Rebollo — The Other Way Around	Best Production Supervision: Carlos Apolinario — The 47; Laia Gómez — A House on Fire; Axier Pérez Serrrano — Undercover; Kati Martí Donoghue — The Red Virgin; Carlos Amoedo — Saturn Return
Best Sound: Diana Sagrista, Eva Valiño, Alejandro Castillo, Antonin Dalmasso — Saturn Return; Amanda Villavieja, Joaquín Rajadel, Víctor R. Puertas, Mayte Cabrera, Nicolas de Poulpiquet — The Blue Star; Sergio Bürmann, Anna Harrington, Marc Orts — The Room Next Door; Fabio Huete, Jorge Castillo Ballesteros, Miriam Lisón, Mayte Cabrera — Undercover; Coque F. Lahera, Álex F Capilla, Nacho Royo-Villanova — The Red Virgin	Best Special Effects: Laura Canals, Iván López Hernández — The 47; Li Xin — Dragonkeeper; Mariano García Marty, Jon Serrano, Juliana Lasunción — Undercover; Raúl Romanillos, Juanma Nogales — The Red Virgin; Jon Serrano, Mariano García Marty, David Heras — Marco, the Invented Truth
Best Costume Design: Arantxa Ezquerro — The Red Virgin; Ester Palaudàries, Vinyet Escobar — Disco, Ibiza, Locomía; Irantzu Ortiz, Olga Rodal — The 47; Bina Daigeler — The Room Next Door; Lourdes Fuentes — Saturn Return	Best Makeup and Hairstyles: Karmele Soler, Sergio Pérez Berbel, Nacho Díaz — Marco, the Invented Truth; Karol Tornaría — The 47; Morag Ross, Manolo García — The Room Next Door; Patricia Rodríguez, Tono Garzón — Undercover; Eli Adánez, Paco Rodríguez Frías — The Red Virgin
Best Original Score: Alberto Iglesias — The Room Next Door; Arnau Bataller — The 47; Arturo Cardelús — Dragonkeeper; Fernando Velázquez — Undercover; Sergio de la Puente — Family Affairs	Best Original Song: "Los almendros" by Antón Álvarez, Yerai Cortés (The Flamenco Guitar of Yerai Cortés); "Show Me" by Fernando Velázquez (Buffalo Kids); "El borde del mundo" by Valeria Castro (The 47); "La virgen roja" by Maria Arnal (The Red Virgin); "Love Is the Worst" by Alondra Bentley, Isaki Lacuesta (Saturn Return)
Best Fictional Short Film: La gran obra; produced by Lluís Quílez Sala, Àlex Lora; Betiko gaua; produced by Ander Barinaga-Rementeria Arano, Ander Sagardoy Múgica, Carmen Lacasa Aguinaga, Eneko Sagardoy, Paul Urkijo; Cuarentena; produced by María del Puy Alvarado, Celia de Molina; El trono; produced by Arturo Valls, Carmela Martínez Oliart, Félix Tusell Sánchez, Lucía Jiménez; Mamántula; produced by Ion de Sosa, Leire Apellaniz, Paola Alvarez, Tasio	Best Animated Short Film: Cafunè; produced by Carlos Fernández de Vigo, Damián Perea, Mintxo Díaz, Sergy Moreno, Lorena Ares; El cambio de rueda; produced by Ainhoa Ramírez Lucendo, Fernando Franco, León Siminiani, Begoña Arostegui; La mujer ilustrada; produced by Diego Herguera, Isabel Herguera; Lola, Lolita, Lolaza; produced by Chelo Loureiro, Mabel Lozano, Pablo Jimeno, Raúl Berdonés; Wan; Carlos Ayerbe, Víctor Monigote
Best Documentary Film: The Flamenco Guitar of Yerai Cortés; produced by Antón Álvarez, Cristina Trenas, Santos Bacana; Domingo domingo; produced by Arunas Matelis, Laura García Andreu, Pepe Andreu, Rafa Molés; Marisol, llámame Pepa; produced by Blanca Torres, Chema de la Peña, José Carlos de Isla Troncoso, Paco Ortiz; Mi hermano Ali; produced by Paula Palacios; No estás sola; produced by Almudena Carracedo, Robert Bahar	Best Documentary Short Film: Semillas de Kivu; produced by Carlos Valle, David Pérez Sañudo, Iván Miñambres, Néstor López, Pepe Castro, Pilar Sancho; Ciao Bambina; produced by Carlo D'Ursi, Jorge Garrido, Afioco Gnecco, Carolina Yuste; Els Buits; produced by Carlotta Schiavon, Ian de la Rosa, Laura Rubirola Sala, Isa Luengo, Marina Freixa Roca, Sofía Esteve; Las novias del sur; produced by David Epiney, Eugenia Mumenthaler, Pepe Andreu, Rafa Molés, Elena López Riera; Los 30 (no) son los nuevos 20; produced by Alfonso Palazón, Juan Vicente Castillejo Navarro

=== Films with multiple nominations and awards ===
Films with multiple nominations
Nominations	Film
14	The 47
13	Undercover
11	Saturn Return
10	The Room Next Door
9	The Red Virgin
8	The Blue Star
8	A House on Fire
5	Marco, the Invented Truth
4	Glimmers
4	I'm Nevenka
3	Dragonkeeper
2	La casa
2	Salve Maria
2	The Other Way Around
2	The Flamenco Guitar of Yerai Cortés
2	Buffalo Kids

Films with multiple awards
Awards	Film
5	The 47
3	Saturn Return
3	The Room Next Door
2	Undercover
2	The Red Virgin
2	The Blue Star
2	Marco, the Invented Truth
2	The Flamenco Guitar of Yerai Cortés

== Honorary Goya ==
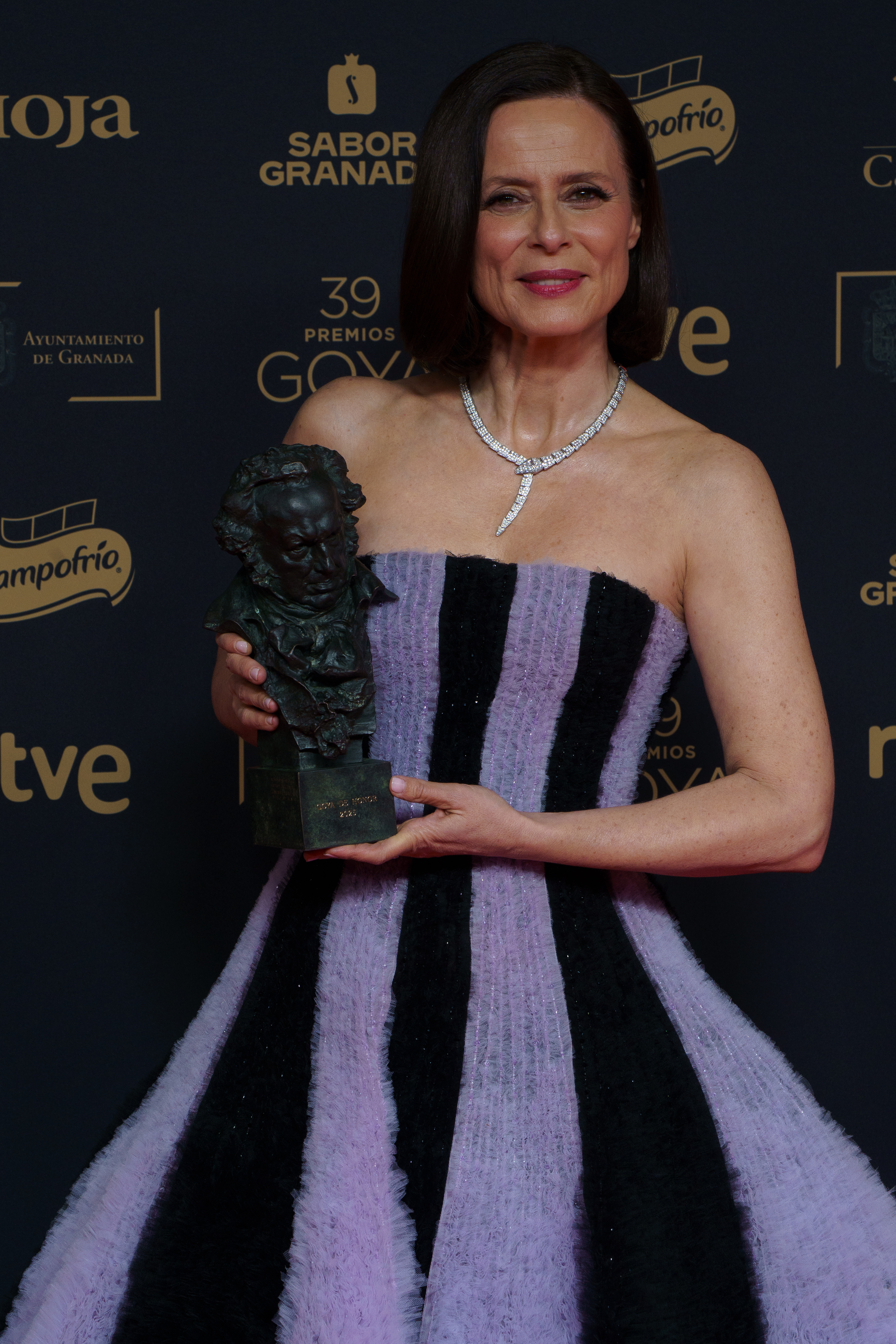
Aitana Sánchez-Gijón, Honorary Goya winner

On 17 October 2024, actress Aitana Sánchez-Gijón was announced as the recipient of the Honorary Goya Award.

== International Goya ==
On 30 January 2025, American actor Richard Gere was announced as the recipient of the International Goya Award.

== Performers ==
Artist(s)	Song(s)
Amaral Miguel Ríos	"Bienvenidos"
Alejandro Sanz	"Abre la puerta"
Rigoberta Bandini	"El amor"
Estrella Morente Kiki Morente Soleá Morente Dellafuente Lola Índigo	"Anda jaleo" "Verde que te quiero verde"
Dora Zahara	"Si tú no estás"

== In Memoriam ==
The In Memoriam tribute was accompanied by musical acts Zahara and Dora Postigo, who performed Rosana Arbelo's Si tú no estás. It paid tribute to individuals including Mayra Gómez Kemp, Marisa Paredes, Xabier Deive, Fermí Reixach, Elisa Montés, Teresa Gimpera, Eva Lyberten, Silvia Tortosa, Jaime de Armiñán, Jaume Lleal, Julián Ortega, La Chunga, José de la Torre, Fermí Reixach, Isabel Álvarez Friera, Ana Bernal, Vanessa Castro, Lola Cordón, Javi Cañón, Daniel Fanego, Txema Blasco, Anastasio de la Fuente, Ernesto Gómez Cruz, Jaime D'Ors, Juanma Carrillo, José Hervás, Paula Martel, Silvia Pinal, Emilio Echevarría, Francisco San Martín, and Rosalía Dans.
