= Pepe Lorente =

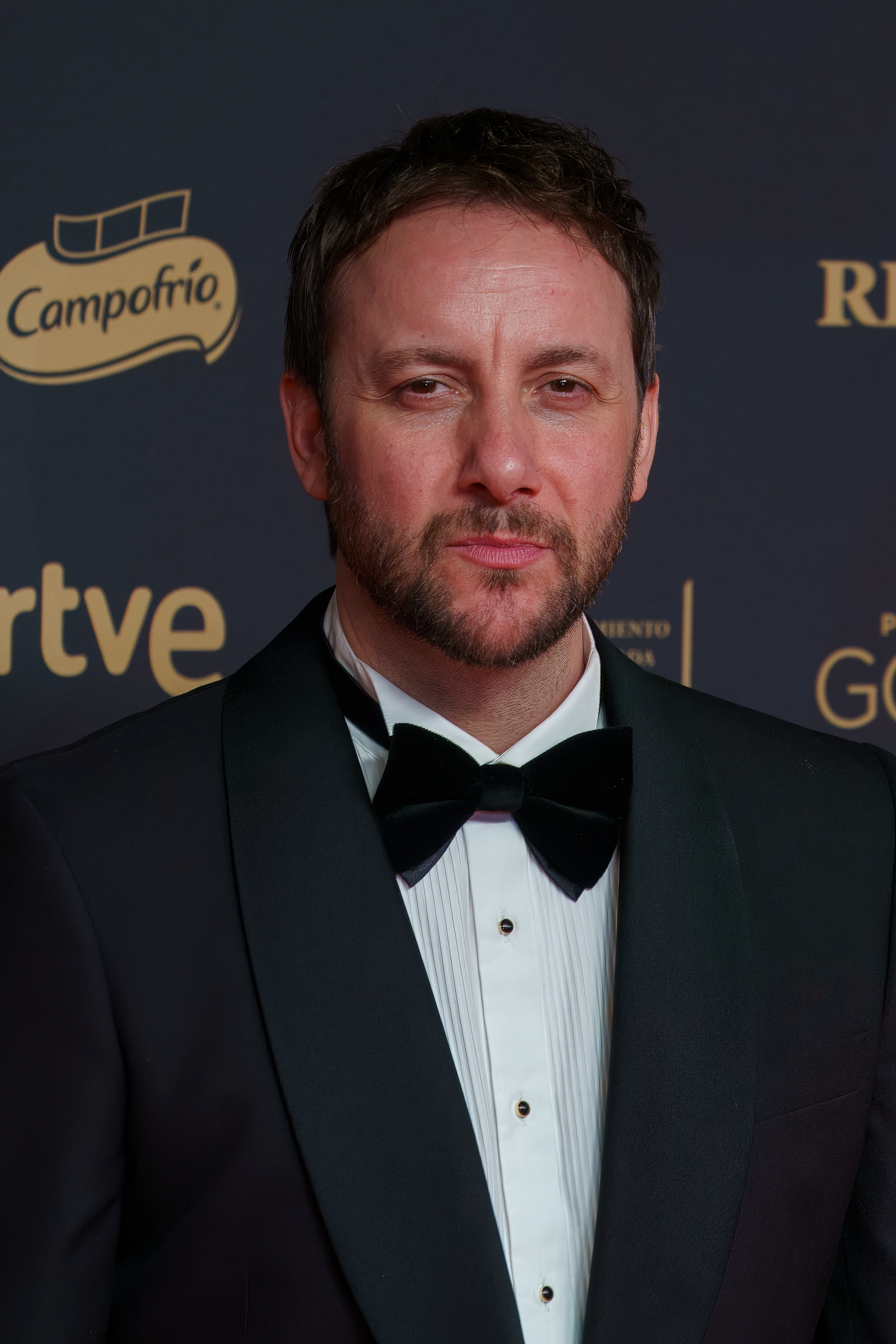
- Lorente in 2025
- Born: 1980 (age 44–45); Zaragoza, Spain
- Occupation: Actor

Pepe Lorente (born 1980) is a Spanish actor. He won the Goya Award for Best New Actor for The Blue Star at the 39th Goya Awards.

== Life and career ==
Born in Zaragoza in 1980, Lorente earned a licentiate degree in law from the Complutense University of Madrid (UCM). His television work include credits in 67 episodes of Amar es para siempre and six episodes of Dafne and the Rest. He made his feature film debut in Paula Ortiz's Chrysalis (2011). He played Jude Thaddaeus in the biblical drama film Risen (2016). He played a small part in Pilar Palomero's Motherhood (2022). His portrayal of Spanish rocker Mauricio Aznar in The Blue Star (2023) earned him the Goya Award for Best New Actor. To prepare for the role, he learned to play guitar and improved on his vocal skills over several years, and became a singer for 'La Estrella Azul Live' project. After shooting The Blue Star, Lorente worked in Vincent Perez's The Edge of the Blade and Álvaro Fernández Armero's The Mortimers.
