= Javier Macipe =

Spanish filmmaker (born 1987)

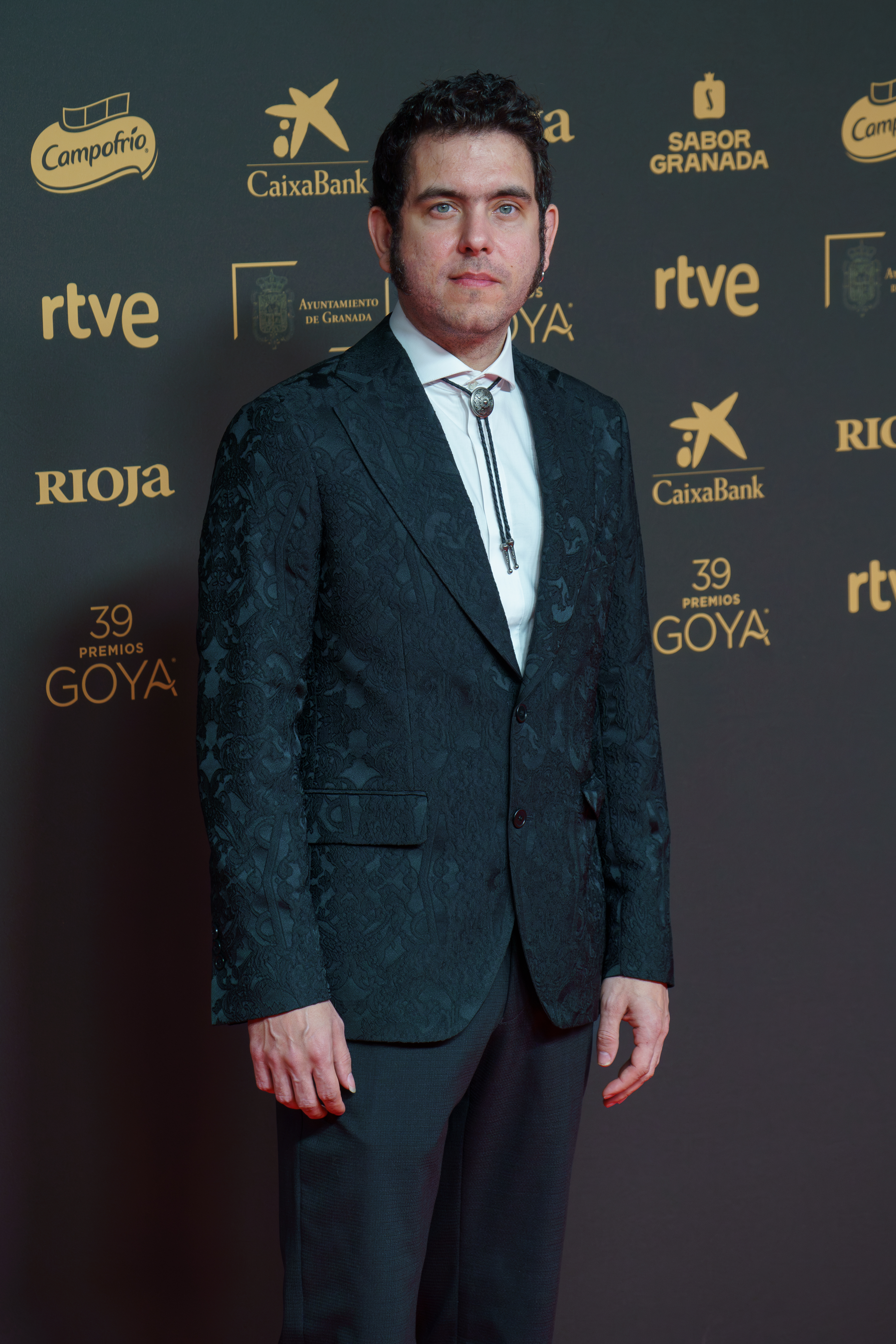
- Macipe in 2025
- Born: Javier Macipe Costa; 1987 (age 38–39); Zaragoza, Aragon, Spain
- Education: Complutense University of Madrid; EICTV
- Occupations: Film director; screenwriter; musician

Javier Macipe Costa (born 1987) is a Spanish filmmaker.

== Life and career ==
Javier Macipe Costa was born in Zaragoza in 1987. He earned a licentiate degree in audiovisual communication from the Complutense University of Madrid in 2010. He also studied direction of actors at the EICTV in Cuba. Some of his early short films include Cuídala bien and Efímera.

His full-length fiction debut The Blue Star (2023) about the spell of Spanish rocker Mauricio Aznar in Argentine province of Santiago del Estero won him the Goya Award for Best New Director (also earning him Best Original Screenplay and Best Editing nominations) at the 39th Goya Awards.
