= Goya Award for Best Documentary Short Film =

Annual award by the Spanish Film Academy

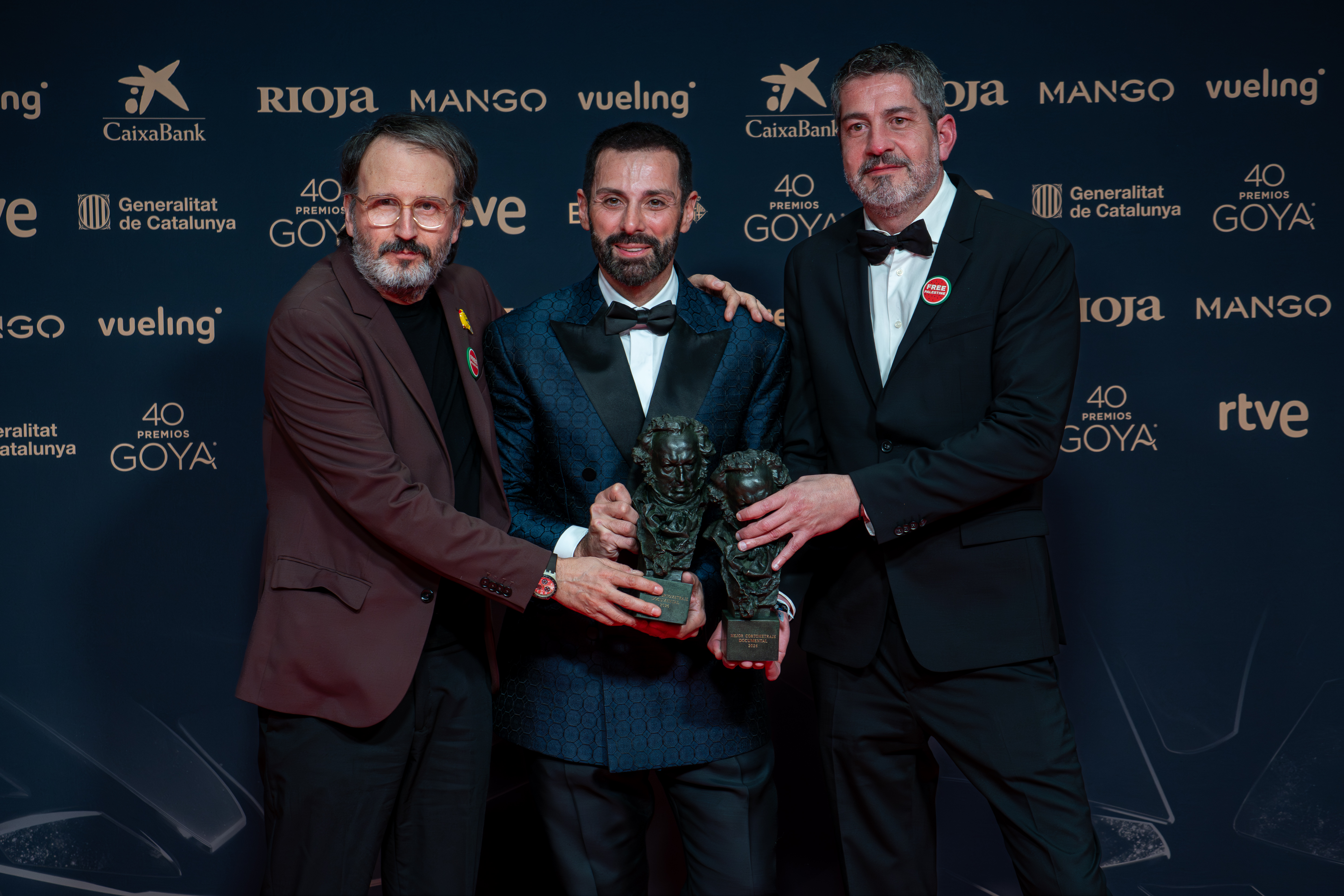
- Adán Aliaga, Carlo D'Ursi, and Miguel Molina Carmona holding the award
- Native name: Premio Goya al mejor cortometraje documental
- Awarded for: Best Spanish documentary short film of the year
- Country: Spain
- Presented by: Academy of Cinematographic Arts and Sciences of Spain (AACCE)
- First award: 7th Goya Awards (1992)
- Most recent winner: El Santo (2025)
- Website: Official website

The Goya Award for Best Documentary Short Film (Spanish: Premio Goya al mejor cortometraje documental) is one of the Goya Awards presented annually by the Academy of Cinematographic Arts and Sciences of Spain (AACCE) since the 7th edition of the awards in 1992. The short film Primer acorde directed by Ramiro Gómez Bermúdez de Castro was the first winner of the award. The category was not presented in 1994, 1995, 1997, and from 2000 to 2002.

== Winners and nominees ==
=== 1990s ===
Year	English title	Original title	Director(s)	Producer(s)
1992 (7th)	Primer acorde		Ramiro Gómez	Ramiro Gómez
1992 (7th)	Manualidades		Santiago Lorenzo	Santiago Lorenzo
1993 (8th)	Verano en la universidad		Nacho Faerma	Nacho Faerna
1993 (8th)	El largo viaje de Rústico		Rolando Díaz	Rolando Díaz
1993 (8th)	Walter Peralta		Jordi Mollà	Jordi Mollá
1994 (9th)	Not awarded			
1995 (10th)	Not awarded			
1996 (11th)	Virgen de la Alegría		José Manuel Campos	José Manuel Campos
1997 (12th)	Not awarded			
1998 (13th)	Confluencias		Pilar García Elegido	Pilar García Elegido
1999 (14th)	Lalia		Sílvia Munt	Silvia Munt
1999 (14th)	El olvido de la memoria		Iñaki Elizalde	Triper & Zapin
1999 (14th)	Positivo		Pilar García Elegido	Pilar García Elegido

=== 2000s ===
Year	English title	Original title	Director(s)	Producer(s)
2000 (15th)	Not awarded			
2001 (16th)	Not awarded			
2002 (17th)	Túnel número 20		Ramon de Fontecha	Ramón de Fontecha
2002 (17th)	Howard Hawks, San Sebastián 1972		Samuel Martínez Martín	Samuel Martínez Martín
2002 (17th)	Mar Madrid		Rafael R. Tranche	Rafael R. Tranche
2003 (18th)	Los niños del Nepal		Joan Soler, Javier Berrocal	Joan Soler, Javier Berrocal
2003 (18th)	Yo soy de mi barrio		Juan Vicente Córdoba	Juan Vicente Córdoba
2004 (19th)	Extras		Ana Serret Ituarte	Ana Serret Ituarte
2004 (19th)	Aerosol		Miguel Ángel Rolland Jiménez	Miguel Ángel Rolland Jiménez
2004 (19th)	El mundo es tuyo		José María Borrell	José María Borrell
2004 (19th)	El último minutero		Elio Quiroga	Elio Quiroga
2004 (19th)	Iván Z		Andrés Duque	Andrés Duque
2005 (20th)	En la cuna del aire		Rodolfo Montero de Palacio	Creacción Films, Producciones Líquidas
2005 (20th)	Castilla y León, Patrimonio de la Humanidad		Antonio Giménez-Rico	Nickel Odeón Dos
2005 (20th)	Nenyure		Jorge Rivero	Oasis Pictures
2006 (21st)	Castañuela 70, el teatro prohibido		Manuel Calvo, Olga Margallo	Encanta Films
2006 (21st)	Abandonatti		Juan Soler	Cinefilms Productions
2006 (21st)	Casting		Koen Suidgeest	El Rayo Films
2006 (21st)	Joe K		Óscar de Julián	Enigma Films
2006 (21st)	La Sereníssima		Gonzalo Ballester	Acción Visual
2007 (22nd)	El hombre feliz		Lucina Gil	Lucina Gil
2007 (22nd)	Carabanchel, un barrio de cine		Juan Carlos Zambrana	Juan Carlos Zambrana
2007 (22nd)	El anónimo Caronte		Toni Bestard	Toni Bestard
2007 (22nd)	Valkirias		Eduardo Soler	Eduardo Soler
2008 (23rd)	Héroes. No hacen falta alas para volar		Ángel Loza	Ángel Loza
2008 (23rd)	Harraga		Eva Patricia Fernández, Mario de la Torre	Eva Patricia Fernández, Mario de la Torre
2008 (23rd)	La clase		Beatriz Sanchis	Beatriz Sanchis
2008 (23rd)	Soy Meera Malik		Marcos Borregón	Marcos Borregón
2009 (24th)	Flores de Ruanda		David Muñoz López	David Muñoz López
2009 (24th)	Doppelgänger		Oscar de Julián	Carlos Valcarcel, Rogelio Abraldes
2009 (24th)	En un lugar del cine		Eduardo Cardoso	Eduardo Cardoso
2009 (24th)	Luchadoras (Mujeres en México)		Benet Román	María del Puy Alvarado, Penélope Cristóbal Casado

=== 2010s ===
Year	English title	Original title	Director(s)	Producer(s)
2010 (25th)	Memorias de un cine de provincias		Ramón Margareto	Ramon Margareto, José Manuel Tenorio
2010 (25th)	El cine libertario: cuando las películas hacen historia		Verónica Vigil, José María Almela	Verónica Vigil
2010 (25th)	El pabellón alemán		Juan Millares	María José Díez Alvarez
2010 (25th)	Un dios que ya no ampara		Gaizka Urresti	Luis Ramírez, Gaizka Urresti
2011 (26th)	Regreso a Viridiana		Pedro González Bermúdez	Domingo Corral, Javier Morales
2011 (26th)	Alma		José Javier Pérez Prieto	Carlos Regidor
2011 (26th)	Nuevos tiempos		Jorge Dorado	Jesús Corredera, Eva Marciel
2011 (26th)	Virgen negra		Raúl de la Fuente	Amaia Remirez, Raúl de la Fuente
2012 (27th)	A Story for the Modlins	Una historia para los Modlins	Sergio Oksman	Sergio Oksman
2012 (27th)	El violinista de Auschwitz		Carlos Hernando	Carlos Hernando
2012 (27th)	Las viudas de Ifni		Pedro Palacios, Pacheco Iborra	Pacheco Iborra, Pedro Palacios
2012 (27th)	Un cineasta en La Codorniz		Javier Rioyo	Rafael Linares
2013 (28th)	Minerita		Raúl de la Fuente	Amaia Remirez
2013 (28th)	El hombre que estaba allí		Luis Felipe Torrente Sánchez-Guisande, Daniel Suberviola Garrigosa	Daniel Suberviola, Luis Felipe Torrente, Olmo Figueredo González-Quevedo
2013 (28th)	La alfombra roja		Iosu López Cía, Manuel Fernández Rodríguez	Manuel Fernández Rodríguez
2013 (28th)	La gran desilusión		Pedro González Kuhn	Pedro González Kuhn
2014 (29th)	Walls	Si estas paredes hablasen	Miguel López Beraza	Juan Antonio Moreno Amador
2014 (29th)	El domador de peixos		Dani Resines, Roger Gómez	Cristina Sánchez
2014 (29th)	El último abrazo		Sergi Pitarch Garrido	María Bravo
2014 (29th)	The Russians Machine	La máquina de los rusos	Octavio Guerra Quevedo	Elisa Torres Adam
2015 (30th)	Hijos de la tierra		Axel O´Mill Tubau, Patxi Uriz Domezáin	Patxi Uriz Domezáin
2015 (30th)	Regreso a la Alcarria		Tomás Cimadevilla Acebo	Tomás Cimadevilla Acebo
2015 (30th)	Ventanas		Pilar García Elegido	Javier J. Gil López
2015 (30th)	Viento de atunes		Alfonso O´Donnell	Alfonso O´Donnell
2016 (31st)	Cabezas habladoras		Juan Vicente Córdoba	Juan Vicente Córdoba
2016 (31st)	Esperanza		Álvaro Longoria	Álvaro Longoria
2016 (31st)	Palabras de caramelo		Juan Antonio Moreno Amador	Juan Antonio Moreno Amador, Silvia Venegas Venegas
2016 (31st)	The Resurrection Club		Álvaro Corcuera, Guillermo Abril	Olmo Figueredo González-Quevedo, Bernabé Rico
2017 (32nd)	Los desheredados		Laura Farrés	Valérie Delpierre
2017 (32nd)	Primavera rosa en México		Mario de la Torre	Rafael Linares Palomar, María del Puy Alvarado, Alfonso Palazón, Eva Patricia Fernández Manzano
2017 (32nd)	The Fourth Kingdom		Adán Aliaga, Àlex Lora	Isa Feliu, Miguel Molina Carmona
2017 (32nd)	Tribus de la inquisición		Mabel Lozano	Mabel Lozano, Roberto Navia
2018 (33rd)	Gaza		Carles Bover Martínez, Julio Pérez del Campo	Carles Bover Martínez, Julio Pérez del Campo
2018 (33rd)	El tesoro		Marisa Lafuente, Néstor Del Castillo	Marisa Lafuente, Néstor Del Castillo
2018 (33rd)	Kyoko		Joan Bover, Marcos Cabotá	Joan Bover
2018 (33rd)	Wan Xia. La última luz del atardecer		Silvia Rey Canudo	Silvia Rey Canudo
2019 (34th)	Nuestra vida como niños refugiados en Europa		Silvia Benegas Benegas	Juan Antonio Moreno Amador, Silvia Venegas Venegas
2019 (34th)	2001 Destellos en la oscuridad		Pedro González Bermúdez	Guillermo Farré, José Skaf, Pedro González Bermúdez
2019 (34th)	El infierno		Raúl de la Fuente	Amaia Remírez García
2019 (34th)	El sueño europeo: Serbia		Jaime Alekos	Jaime Alekos

=== 2020s ===
Year	English title	Original title	Director(s)	Producer(s)
2020 (35th)	Biografía del cadáver de una mujer		Mabel Lozano	Mabel Lozano
2020 (35th)	Paraíso en llamas		José Antonio Hergueta	José Antonio Hergueta
2020 (35th)	Paraíso		Mateo Cabeza	Mateo Cabeza
2020 (35th)	Solo son peces		Ana Serna, Paula Iglesias	Olatz Alonso
2021 (36th)	Mama		Pablo de la Chica	David Casas Riesco, David Torres Vázquez, Diego Urruchi, Eduardo Jiménez, Fernando J. Monge, Jordi Rubio, Kathleen McInnis, Miguel González, Néstor López, Soo-Jeong Kang
2021 (36th)	Dajla: cine y olvido		Arturo Dueñas Herrero	Arturo Dueñas Herrero
2021 (36th)	Figurante		Nacho Fernández	Cristóbal García
2021 (36th)	Ulisses		Joan Bover	Joan Bover
2022 (37th)	Maldita. A Love Song to Sarajevo		Amaia Remírez García, Raúl de la Fuente	Iván Zahínos
2022 (37th)	Dancing with Rosa		Robert Muñoz Rupérez	Mar Canet Baños
2022 (37th)	La gàbia		Adán Aliaga	Adán Aliaga, Miguel Molina Carmona
2022 (37th)	Memoria		Nerea Barros	Hernán Zin, Nerea Barros
2022 (37th)	Trazos del alma		Rafa Arroyo	Rafa Arroyo
2023 (38th)	Ava		Mabel Lozano	Mabel Lozano
2023 (38th)	BLOW!		Neus Ballús	Miriam Porté, Neus Ballús
2023 (38th)	El bus		Sandra Reina	Jaime Fargas Coll, Valérie Delpierre
2023 (38th)	Herederas		Silvia Venegas Venegas	Juan Antonio Moreno Amador, Silvia Venegas Venegas
2023 (38th)	Una terapia de mierda		Javier Polo	Javier Polo, Jorge Acosta, Juanjo Moscardó Rius, Maxi Valero, Nathalie Martínez
2024 (39th)	Semillas de Kivu		Carlos Valle, Néstor López	Carlos Valle, David Pérez Sañudo, Iván Miñambres, Néstor López, Pepe Castro, Pilar Sancho
2024 (39th)	Ciao Bambina		Afioco Gnecco, Carolina Yuste	Carlo D'Ursi, Jorge Garrido
2024 (39th)	Els Buits		Isa Luengo, Marina Freixa Roca, Sofía Esteve	Carlotta Schiavon, Ian de la Rosa, Laura Rubirola Sala
2024 (39th)	Las novias del sur		Elena López Riera	David Epiney, Eugenia Mumenthaler, Pepe Andreu, Rafa Molés
2024 (39th)	Los 30 (no) son los nuevos 20		Juan Vicente Castillejo Navarro	Alfonso Palazón, Juan Vicente Castillejo Navarro
2025 (40th)	El Santo		Carlo D'Ursi	Adán Aliaga, Carlo D'Ursi, Miguel Molina Carmona
2025 (40th)	Dissonancia		Raquel Larrosa	Eva Patricia Fernández Manzano, Rafael Linares
2025 (40th)	La conversación que nunca tuvimos		Cristina Urgel	Cristina Urgel, Eva Moreno
2025 (40th)	The Painter's Room		María Colomer Canyelles	Bernat Manzano, Miguel Ángel Blanca, Montse Pujol Solà
2025 (40th)	Zona Wao		Nagore Eceiza Mugica	Izaskun Arandia, Nagore Eceiza Mugica

== See also ==
- Academy Award for Best Documentary Short Film
- César Award for Best Documentary Short Film
