= In a Heartbeat (film) =

2017 American animated short film

- Directed by: Esteban Bravo; Beth David
- Screenplay by: Esteban Bravo; Beth David
- Starring: Nick Ainsworth; Kelly Donohue
- Music by: Arturo Cardelús
- Production company: Ringling College of Art and Design
- Distributed by: YouTube
- Release date: July 31, 2017
- Running time: 4 minutes
- Country: United States
- Language: English

In a Heartbeat is a 2017 American animated short film produced by Ringling College of Art and Design. Written and directed by Esteban Bravo and Beth David, the project was funded through Kickstarter, raising $14,191 from 416 backers on a goal of $3,000. The short film concerns a closeted gay boy, Sherwin, who has a crush on another boy named Jonathan and his heart desires to be with him. The short received wide praise on various platforms and was shortlisted for an Academy Award for Best Animated Short Film.

== Plot ==
Sherwin, a shy ginger-haired boy, arrives at school awaiting the arrival of his secret crush, Jonathan. Sherwin hides in a tree and watches as Jonathan walks by reading a book and playing with an apple. Suddenly, Sherwin's heart begins to beat rapidly and becomes anthropomorphic, leaving his body and chasing after Jonathan. Sherwin attempts to grab and hide his heart, resulting in various awkward encounters with Jonathan. Eventually, Sherwin chases his heart inside the school and grabs it. Then the heart grabs Jonathan's finger. The situation becomes uncomfortable as other students see the two and look on in confusion. To take his embarrassment out, Sherwin pulls his side of the heart off, causing it to break. The heart breaks in two and Sherwin runs away with one half, while Jonathan is left with the other. Outside the school, Sherwin cries silently, then Jonathan walks up to him and wants to offer him his heart back. They hold their hands together as they join the heart back together and it happily springs to life. The scene fades to black with Sherwin and Jonathan's hearts glowing and then forming into one.

== Production ==
Production on the short started in January 2016, when Esteban Bravo and Beth David began working on their senior thesis at Ringling College of Art and Design. The initial pitch featured a boy and a girl, but at the last minute they decided to switch it to a same-sex couple in order to make the story feel "more personal". They made a Kickstarter page in November 2016 to complete the film and earned more than enough of the requested amount. A trailer was released on May 17, 2017 and the short film was released on July 31, 2017.

== Reception ==
The short film received overwhelmingly universal praise for its animation, positive message and emotional resonance. The short film blew up on YouTube, with an estimated 51 million views, and has been passed on through Facebook and Twitter. Reaction videos were posted by Fine Brothers Entertainment, Ellen DeGeneres and Connor Franta. It was later named No. 9 on YouTube's list of the top 10 trending videos of 2017.

== Awards ==
Since its launch, the film has received numerous awards and has been shown at numerous LGBT events and film festivals. It got shortlisted at the Academy Awards for Best Animated Short Film, but did not get a nomination. The short was also included in The Animation Showcase 2017 world touring screening that premiered it in London 25 July 2017 in Soho House.

| Year | Presenter/Festival | Award/Category | Status |
|---|---|---|---|
| 2017 | Academy Awards | Best Animated Short Film | Shortlisted |
| 2017 | Animation Shorts Film Festival | Jury Award | Nominated |
| 2017 | ASIFA-SOUTH Animation Conference and Festival | Official Selection | |
| 2017 | GLAAD Media Awards | Special Recognition | Won |
| 2017 | HollyShorts Film Festival | Best LGBT | Won |
| 2017 | Lake View International Film Festival | Best LGBT Film | Won |
| 2017 | North Carolina Gay & Lesbian Film Festival | Jury Award | Won |
| 2017 | Student Academy Awards | Animation (Domestic Film Schools) | Won |
| 2017 | Student Academy Awards | Best Animated Short (Domestic) | Won (Gold) |
| 2017 | TAIS Animation Showcase | Official Selection | |
| 2017 | Trinity Film Festival | Alumni Choice Award | Won |

Achievements
| Preceded by THE $21,000 FIRST CLASS AIRPLANE SEAT | Top 10 trending videos on YouTube; Ranked 9th in 2017 | Succeeded by Behan Bhai Ki School Life |
