= Terra Alta (TV series) =

Spanish television series

Terra Alta is a Spanish thriller miniseries created by Eligio R. Montero for Movistar Plus+, based on the novel of the same name by Javier Cercas. It was produced by Secuoya Studios and stars Miguel Bernardeau. The six-episode miniseries debuted on Movistar Plus+ on December 4, 2025.

== Plot ==
In the Terra Alta region of Tarragona, Francisco and Rosa Adell, the patriarch and matriarch of the wealthiest and most powerful family in the area, were murdered. Melchor Marín, one of the agents in charge of the investigation, must confront his past in order to solve the case.

== Cast ==
- Miguel Bernardeau
- Iván Massagué
- Marta Etura
- Bea Segura
- Goya Toledo
- Pere Ponce
- Pablo Derqui
- Manel Barceló
- Jordi Martínez
- Francesc Orella

== Production ==
In July 2024, Movistar Plus+ announced that filming had begun on an adaptation of the novel Terra Alta by Javier Cercas, which would consist of six episodes and be produced by Secuoya Studios. The series was created by Eligio R. Montero, written by Montero and Carmen López-Areal, and directed by Eduard Cortés. Miguel Bernardeau, Ivan Massagué, Marta Etura, Bea Segura, Goya Toledo, Pere Ponce, Pablo Derqui, Manel Barceló, Jordi Martínez and Francesc Orella were confirmed as cast members. Filming took place over 14 weeks on locations in Cataluña, including Barcelona, Terra Alta itself, and the Canary Islands.

== Launch and reception ==
Following the announcement that shooting had begun, there was no further news about the project for a year. Then, in late November 2025, Movistar Plus+ announced that Terra Alta would debut on its platform on December 4, 2025.

The film's score, composed by Arturo Cardelús, won a Hollywood Music in Media Award for Best Original Score – TV Show/Limited Series (Foreign Language).
