= Semillas de Kivu =

Semillas de Kivu (Seeds from Kivu) is a 2024 Spanish documentary short film directed by Néstor López and Carlos Valle. The 29-minute film focuses on women who have survived sexual violence in Kivu, in the Democratic Republic of the Congo, and their efforts to recover and reintegrate into their communities. The documentary centers on survivors receiving treatment at Panzi Hospital in Bukavu, founded by gynecologist and Nobel Peace Prize laureate Denis Mukwege. The film won the Goya Award for Best Documentary Short Film.

== Subject ==
The documentary follows women who have experienced sexual violence during the armed conflicts in eastern Democratic Republic of the Congo and who receive treatment at Panzi Hospital. It focuses particularly on the psychological consequences of the violence and the women's attempts to rebuild their lives and reintegrate into their communities. The film also addresses the experiences of women who have children as a result of rape.

The filmmakers initially conceived the project around Mukwege and his work at Panzi Hospital. After arriving in Bukavu, however, they shifted the focus toward the women themselves. Néstor López said that Mukwege became the framework for the story while the women became its principal subjects.

The film contains few images of the operating rooms at Panzi. López said that the filmmakers chose not to film some of the women's most serious injuries out of respect for and to protect the women filmed. Instead, the documentary emphasizes their testimony and the psychological process of recovering from the violence.

The title refers to the filmmakers' characterization of the women as "seeds of hope", reflecting their efforts to recover their lives following their experiences of sexual violence.

== Production ==
The filmmakers began developing a project about Kivu in 2017, initially focusing on Mukwege and his work at Panzi Hospital. They filmed in Bukavu in 2022.

López and Valle directed the film. López and Teresa Bellón wrote the screenplay. Pablo Díaz served as cinematographer and Cristina Otero as editor. Arturo Cardelús composed the music. The film was produced in Spain and received support from the Spanish Institute of Cinematography and Audiovisual Arts (ICAA).

== Release and reception ==
Semillas de Kivu premiered at the Valladolid International Film Festival (Seminci). It subsequently screened at other festivals and received the Amnesty International Award at Abycine.

The film won the award for Best Documentary Short Film at the 39th Goya Awards.
