= Afioco Gnecco =

Italian photographer

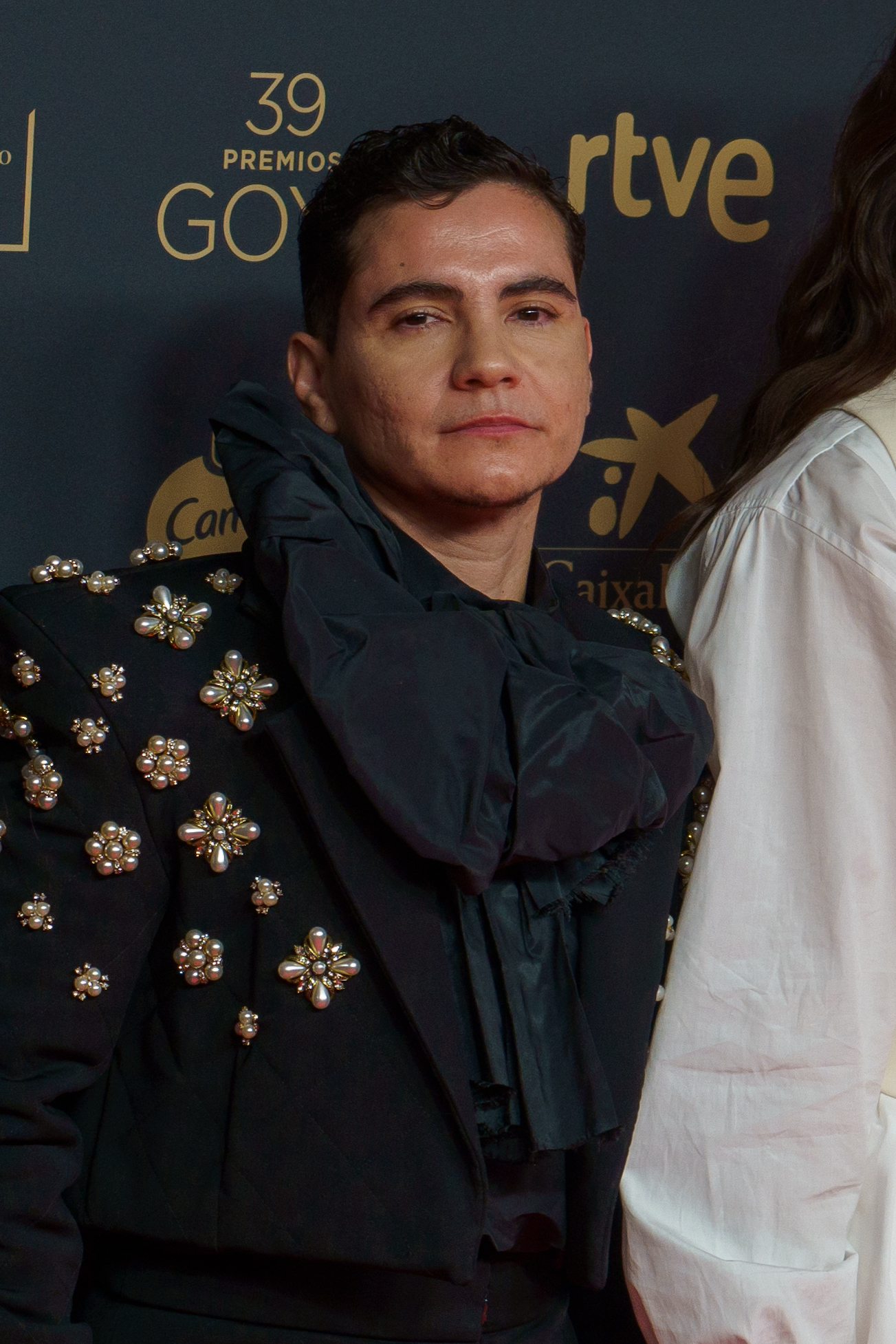
- Gnecco in 2025
- Occupations: Film director, producer, screenwriter
- Years active: 2016–present
- Known for: Queer cinema, LGBT audiovisual activism
- Notable work: Ciao Bambina, Indetectables, La acampada, Mapá

Afioco Gnecco is a Chilean-Italian film director, producer, and screenwriter. He was nominated at the 39th Goya Awards for the short film Ciao Bambina.

As a non-binary transgender person, Gnecco has also been an active LGBT audiovisual activist since 2016, working with the Spanish organization Apoyo Positivo to promote diversity and inclusion in media.

== Early life and career ==
After studying cinema, Gnecco ventured into photography and video arts.

In 2017, together with Apoyo Positivo, he created the series Indetectables, which seeks to raise awareness about the stigma of HIV in society. In 2022, Gnecco won the call Desde Otro Prisma, organized by Notodofilmfest and Netflix, which led to the development of his first feature film Mapá. In 2023, he premiered his short film La acampada in the official section at the Malaga Festival, where Gnecco won the silver Biznaga audience award.

In 2025, Gnecco was a guest on the podcast Sabor a Queer, presented by film director David Velduque, in an episode focused on the representation of trans-masculine people in Spanish cinema, and in which Charli Bujosa and Emilio Papamija also appeared.

Gnecco began his film career focusing on stories that explore identity, gender, and social inclusion. His work has been featured at international film festivals such as the Málaga Film Festival, where projects like La Acampada were screened.

In 2025, Gnecco received a nomination for Best Short Film at the Goya Awards for Ciao Bambina, a poignant story reflecting queer experiences in Europe. The nomination was celebrated as a milestone for transgender representation in Spanish-language cinema.

== Works ==
=== Cinema ===
- Ciao Bambina (2024)
- Este cuerpo mío (2023)
- Mapá (2023)
- La acampada (2022)
- No binario (2020)
- Victoria (2019)
- Transversales (2019)
- Diversxs (2016)

=== TV ===
- Indetectables

== Activism ==
Since 2016, Gnecco has worked with Apoyo Positivo, a Spanish NGO focused on health, education, and human rights for the LGBT community. Through audiovisual storytelling, Gnecco advocates for broader representation of marginalized identities in media and culture.

== Recognition ==
Gnecco's work has garnered media coverage in several Spanish-language publications including *La Vanguardia*, which highlights his role in shaping queer cinema. A similar profile was published by *Andalucía Información*, highlighting his Goya nomination and activism.

== Awards ==
- Abycine Impulso CMM Award for the production of Este cuerpo mío. 2023
- Silver Biznaga audience award at the Malaga Film Festival for La acampada. 2022
- Zinegoak special award for Transversales. 2019
- Mostra La Ploma, best educational perspective award for Diversxs. 2020
- Special mention of the Jury in LesGaiCineMad. 2016
- Andalusia Radio Television Award for the best audiovisual creation at the Córdoba Film Festival
- Best short documentary award of the nahia International Short Film Festival 2016: sexo, género y erotismo
- Best short documentary award by CinHomo Muestra LGBT Cinema of Valladolid
- Best Documentary Short Film Award Castilla-La Mancha International Social Film Festival
- Best Documentary Short Award Venezuelan Diversity Film Festival - FESTDIVQ
