= The Blue Star (film) =

- Theatrical release poster
- Spanish: La estrella azul
- Directed by: Javier Macipe
- Screenplay by: Javier Macipe
- Produced by: Simón de Santiago; Amelia Hernández Causapé; Hernán Musaluppi
- Starring: Pepe Lorente; Cuti Carabajal; Mariela Carabajal; Noelia Verenice López; Demi Carabajal; Marc Rodríguez; Bruna Cusí; Catalina Sopelana; Aitor Domingo; Coya Chavero; Pablo Carabajal
- Cinematography: Álvaro Medina
- Edited by: Nacho Blasco
- Music by: Alicia Morote; Peteco Carabajal
- Production companies: MOD Producciones; El Pez Amarillo; Cimarrón; La Charito Films; Prisma
- Distributed by: Wanda Visión (es); Cinetren (ar)
- Release dates: 25 September 2023 (Zinemaldia); 23 February 2024 (Spain); 12 September 2024 (Argentina)
- Running time: 129 minutes
- Countries: Spain; Argentina
- Language: Spanish

The Blue Star (Spanish: La estrella azul) is a 2023 drama film written and directed by Javier Macipe (in his directorial debut feature) inspired by the life of Aragonese musician Mauricio Aznar which stars Pepe Lorente.

== Plot ==
Set in the 1990s, the plot follows the plight of Spanish rocker Mauricio, who leaves his band and wanders around Latin America seeking to rediscover his musical vocation. He becomes acquainted with folk genres such as the chacarera in Santiago del Estero, and teams up with old musician Don Carlos.

== Cast ==
- Pepe Lorente as Mauricio Aznar
- Cuti Carabajal as Carlos Carabajal
- Mariela Carabajal as Andrea Carabajal
- Demi Carabajal as himself
- Miriam Gutiérrez as Zita Carabajal
- Noelia Verenice Díaz as Florcita Carabajal
- Marc Rodríguez as Pedro
- Bruna Cusí as Ana
- Catalina Sopelana as Mara
- Aitor Domingo as Gabriel
- Pablo Carabajal as himself
- Peteco Carabajal as himself
- Coya Chavero as Atahualpa Yupanqui

== Production ==
The project was born as a commission from Mauricio Aznar's mother to Javier Macipe 18 years before the theatrical release of the film. The film is a Spanish-Argentine co-production by MOD Producciones, El Pez Amarillo and Cimarrón, alongside La Charito Films and Prisma. Filming began in 2020 in Zaragoza. It was interrupted in the wake of the COVID-19 pandemic. It resumed in Argentina in late 2022, shooting in locations such as Santiago del Estero.

== Release ==
The film was selected for the 'New Directors' section of the 71st San Sebastián International Film Festival, premiering on 25 September 2023. Its festival run also included screenings at the Warsaw Film Festival, the Seville European Film Festival, the Mar del Plata International Film Festival, and the 39th Santa Barbara International Film Festival. It was released theatrically in Spain on 23 February 2024.

Cinetren handled distribution in Argentina. The theatrical release in Argentina and Uruguay was set for 12 September 2024.

== Reception ==
=== Critical response ===
Philipp Engel of Cinemanía rated the film 4½ out of 5 stars deeming it to be "pure cinephile craftmanship, the emotion about a finely done work" in the verdict, while writing that the film has "a universal reach, infinitely broader than the band's fan club".

Alberto Olmos of El Confidencial rated the film 5 out of 5 stars, deeming it to be "a very beautiful film, of good people, of sacred sadness" and "the best cinema possible".

Paula Arantzazu Ruiz of Ara rated the film 4 out of 5 stars writing that "everything is diaphanous and poetic at the same time" in the film, while the biographical account "is imbued with a truly authentic emotion".

Alejandro Lingenti of La Nación rated the film 4 out of 5 stars ('very good'), writing that the fiction "intersects opportunely with the documentary to enhance the affective community that existed between the Spanish musician and his warm hosts [from Santiago del Estero]".

In September 2024, the Academy of Cinematographic Arts and Sciences of Spain selected The Blue Star for a shortlist of 3 films to determine their final submission for Best International Feature Film at the 97th Academy Awards.

=== Accolades ===
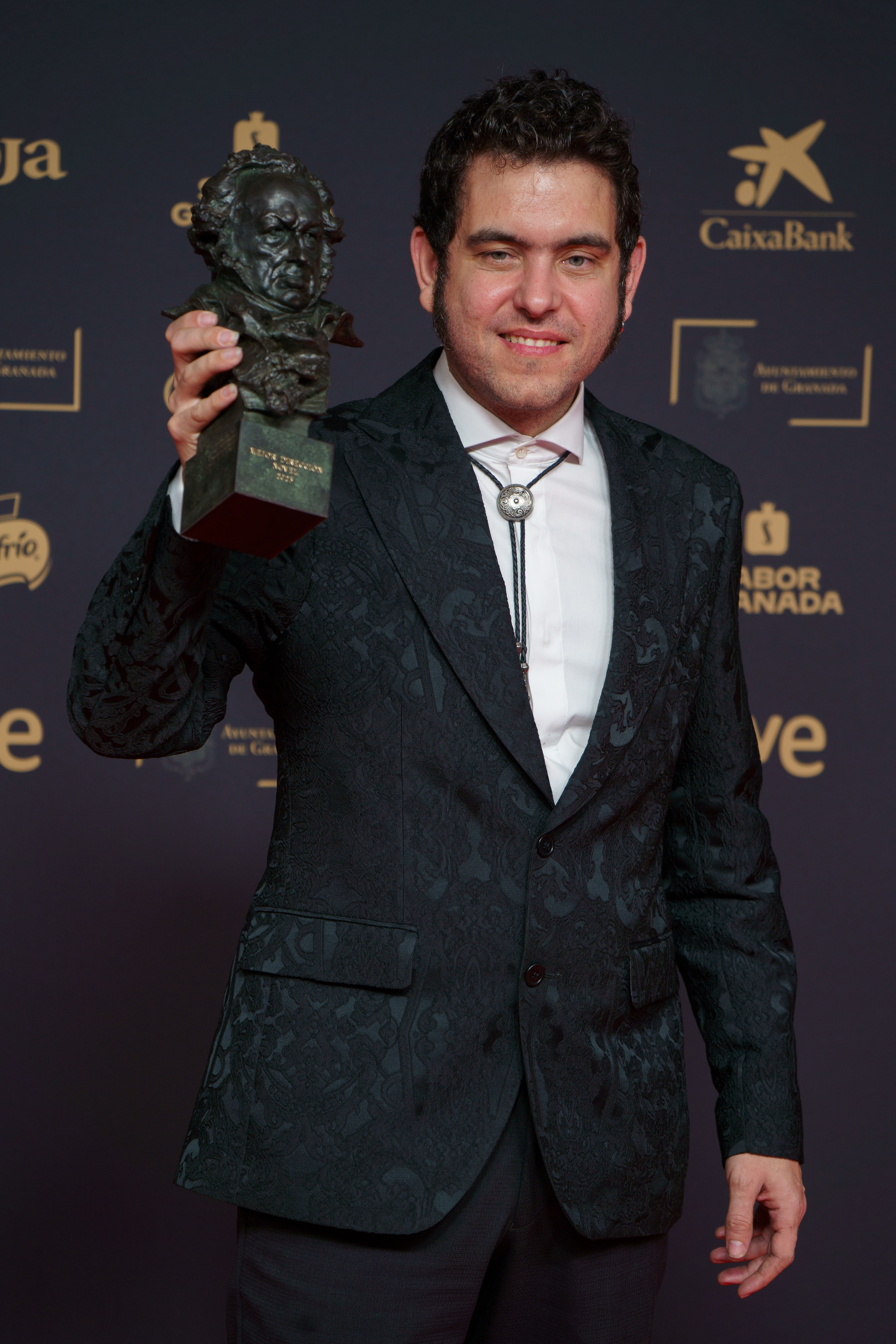
Macipe holding his Goya Award for Best New Director

Year	Award	Category	Nominee(s)	Result	Ref.
2024	39th Santa Barbara International Film Festival	Nueva Vision Award for Spain / Latin America Cinema		Won	
2024	42nd Uruguay International Film Festival	Audience Award		Won	
2024	42nd Uruguay International Film Festival	Young Jury Award		Won	
2024	29th Toulouse Spanish Film Festival	Golden Violet		Won	
2024	29th Toulouse Spanish Film Festival	Best Director	Javier Macipe	Won	
2024	29th Toulouse Spanish Film Festival	Best Actor	Pepe Lorente	Won	
2024	29th Toulouse Spanish Film Festival	Best Music	Alicia Morote, Peteco Carabajal	Won	
2024	29th Toulouse Spanish Film Festival	Audience Award		Won	
2024	30th Forqué Awards	Best Film		Nominated	
2024	30th Forqué Awards	Best Actor in a Film	Pepe Lorente	Nominated	
2024	30th Forqué Awards	Cinema and Education in Values		Nominated	
2025	12th Feroz Awards	Best Drama Film		Nominated	
2025	12th Feroz Awards	Best Screenplay in a Film	Javier Macipe	Nominated	
2025	12th Feroz Awards	Best Main Actor in a Film	Pepe Lorente	Nominated	
2025	12th Feroz Awards	Best Film Poster	Laura Pere	Nominated	
2025	4th Carmen Awards	Best Non-Andalusian Produced Film		Won	
2025	4th Carmen Awards	Best Cinematography	Álvaro Medina	Won	
2025	80th CEC Medals	Best New Director	Javier Macipe	Won	
2025	80th CEC Medals	Best Original Screenplay	Javier Macipe	Nominated	
2025	80th CEC Medals	Best New Actor	Pepe Lorente	Nominated	
2025	80th CEC Medals	Best New Actor	Cuti Carabajal	Nominated	
2025	80th CEC Medals	Best New Actress	Mariela Carabajal	Nominated	
2025	80th CEC Medals	Best Supporting Actress	Bruna Cusí	Nominated	
2025	80th CEC Medals	Best Editing	Javier Macipe, Nacho Blasco	Nominated	
2025	39th Goya Awards	Best Film		Nominated	
2025	39th Goya Awards	Best New Director	Javier Macipe	Won	
2025	39th Goya Awards	Best New Actress	Mariela Carabajal	Nominated	
2025	39th Goya Awards	Best New Actor	Cuti Carabajal	Nominated	
2025	39th Goya Awards	Best New Actor	Pepe Lorente	Won	
2025	39th Goya Awards	Best Editing	Javier Macipe, Nacho Blasco	Nominated	
2025	39th Goya Awards	Best Original Screenplay	Javier Macipe	Nominated	
2025	39th Goya Awards	Best Sound	Amanda Villavieja, Joaquín Rajadel, Víctor R. Puertas, Mayte Cabrera, Nicolas de Poulpiquet	Nominated	
2025	33rd Actors and Actresses Union Awards	Best Film Actress in a Minor Role	Catalina Sopelana	Nominated	
2025	33rd Actors and Actresses Union Awards	Best New Actor	Pepe Lorente	Won	
2025	8th ALMA Awards	Best Screenplay in a Drama Film	Javier Macipe	Won	
2025	12th Platino Awards	Best Ibero-American Debut Film		Nominated	

== See also ==
- List of Spanish films of 2024
- List of Argentine films of 2024
