= Mabel Lozano =

Spanish actress

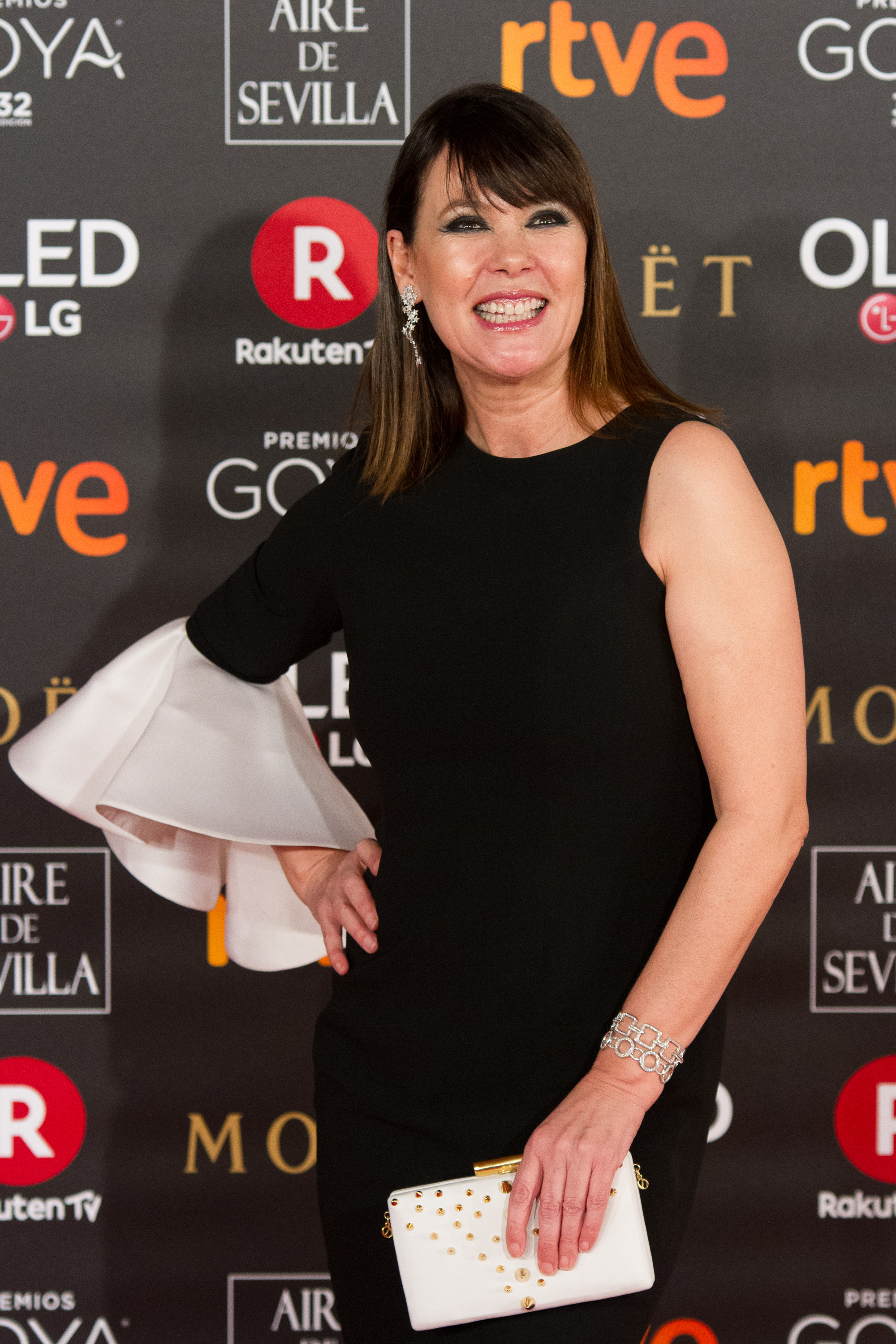
- Mabel Lozano at the 2018 Goya Awards
- Born: María Isabel López García; 28 December 1967 (age 57); Villaluenga de la Sagra, Toledo, Spain
- Occupation(s): Spanish actress, model, screenwriter, film director, documentary filmmaker and writer.
- Years active: 1990-present

Mabel Lozano (Villaluenga de la Sagra, December 28, 1967) is a Spanish writer, model, film director, film and television actress and activist in defense of women's rights. In her work she denounces the sexual exploitation of women through prostitution and trafficking. In 2021 she received the Goya Award for best documentary short film for Biografía del cadáver de una mujer.

== Biography ==
Born in Villaluenga de la Sagra, Lozano moved to Madrid, where she came into contact with the world of fashion catwalks, living in Japan, Paris and Milan. Upon her return to Spain, she became popular when she started working on television.

=== Professional career ===
She was the presenter of the TVE program Noche de Fiesta in 1999, together with Miguel Ángel Tobías, until she was replaced in 2000 by Juncal Rivero.

She also began presenting TVE's New Year's Eve specials, replacing Norma Duval in 1999 until 2003. She shared presenting duties with Ramón García, Juncal Rivero, María José Suárez, Nuria Roca, Andoni Ferreño and Juan y Medio.

In 2007 she took a turn in her career. After attending university to study filmmaking and completing a master's degree in social cinema and human rights at the University of Galway, she began a career as a documentary filmmaker for human rights, writing and directing her first feature documentary Voices against trafficking in women, shot in Romania, Moldova and Spain, in which she denounced the buying and selling of women and girls for the purpose of sexual exploitation. Voices against trafficking in women has been used for the training of law enforcement agencies and the Public Prosecutor's Office.

Since then, in addition to short films and spots, she has made other feature documentaries: 2009's La teoría del espiralismo, starring five Paralympic athletes; 2010's Las sabias de la tribu as a tribute to the generations of post-war women who fought for their rights; 2012's Madre, a documentary about motherhood in the 21st century.

In 2014 she released the short film Las mujeres que triunfan in which she talks about the success of women over 45.

In 2015 she released the documentary Chicas nuevas 24 horas, about trafficking and sexual exploitation of women; which is a co-production between Argentina, Colombia, Paraguay, Peru and Spain that was nominated for the Goya Award and the Platino Ibero-American Film Awards.

In 2018 she presented El proxeneta. Paso corto, mala leche the true story in first person of a trafficker of women through which she reviews the evolution of prostitution and trafficking in Spain since the 1980s. She wrote a non-fiction novel with the same story that won the Rodolfo Walsh award.

In 2021 she won the Goya Award for documentary short film for Biografía del cadáver de una mujer. In May 2021 she presented the spot for the campaign "If you pay, you abuse" to dissuade young people from paying for sex. This was promoted by the Generalitat Valenciana in the framework of the Forum for the Abolition of Prostitution.

She is a member of CIMA (Association of Women Filmmakers and Audiovisual Media).

== Personal life ==
On April 19, 2020, she communicated on her Instagram account that she had undergone emergency surgery for breast cancer, diagnosed in March.

== Filmography ==
=== Director ===
Year	Film	Scriptwriter
2014	Las mujeres que triunfan	Mabel Lozano
2015	Chicas nuevas 24 horas	Susana Fernández Mabel Lozano Alicia Luna
2017	El proxeneta	Mabel Lozano Alicia Luna
2020	Biografía del cadáver de una mujer	Mabel Lozano, Fernando Marías Amondo

=== Cinema ===
Year	Film	Director
2004	Tiovivo c. 1950	José Luis Garci
2002	Navidad en el Nilo	Neri Parenti
2001	Corazón de bombón	Álvaro Sáenz de Heredia
1999	París-Tombuctú	Luis García Berlanga
1999	¡Mamá, preséntame a papá!	Charlotte de Turckheim
1998	Una pareja perfecta	Francesc Betriu
1998	Grandes ocasiones	Felipe Vega
1997	Al límite	Eduardo Campoy
1995	Dile a Laura que la quiero	José Miguel Juárez
1992	Vivir por nada	Javier Sacristán

== Television ==
Year	Series	Character
2005	Lobos	Paloma
2004	La sopa boba	Patricia
2003	Código fuego	Marga
2000-2001	La ley y la vida	Camino
1996-2000	La casa de los líos	Mari Luz
1994	Vecinos	
1993-1996	Los ladrones van a la oficina	Reme

== Programs ==
Year	Series	Role
2011-	El ojo del tigre	Collaborator
2011-	TDT: Te damos la tarde	Collaborator
2007-2011	Noche sensacional	Host
2003, 2004, 2006, 2007, 2008, 2009, 2010, 2011 y 2013	Pasapalabra	Assistant to contestant
1998, 2001 y 2006	Furor	Contestant
2002	Con la primera al 2003	Host
2001	Con la primera al 2002	Host
2000	Con la primera al 2001	Host
2000	Humor se escribe con H	Co-Host
1999 y 2000	Telepasión Española	Collaborator
1999	Con la primera al 2000	Host
1999	Noche de fiesta	Host
1997	Navidades en Series	Host
1996 y 1997	Grand Prix	Godmother
1991-1992	La ruleta de la fortuna	Host

== Publications ==
- El Proxeneta (2018) Editorial Alreves,
- PornoXplotación: La explosión de la gran edición de nuestros tiempos (2020) Editorial Alreves, by Mabel Lozano and Pablo J. Conellie.

== Awards and recognitions ==
- 2009: Málaga Film Festival Award or the Cross of Merit of the National Police.
- 2013: received the VI Participando Creamos espacios de Igualdad Award in the category of Art and Culture, granted by the Women's Council of the municipality of Madrid.
- 2015: Oxfam Intermon's Avanzadoras award.
- 2016: Premio Amnesty International ABCyCine Award, Latin Gold Award and Most Supportive Character Award.
- 2017: Honorary Citizen by the City Council of Toledo.
- 2018: Rodolfo Walsh Award for Best Non-Fiction Crime Novel of 2017 written in Spanish for her work El proxeneta (The Pimp), which narrates the life of the owner of one of Spain's largest brothels.
- 2018: received the Best Activist Screenplay 2018 award, at the XXI Edition of the Progressive Women Awards 2018 given by the Federation of Progressive Women.
- 2021: Goya Award for documentary short film for Biografía del cadáver de una mujer.
- 2021: Comadre de Oro Award granted by La Tertulia Feminista 'Les Comadres' in recognition: "for her permanent and tireless efforts to bring to light the tragic lives of prostituted women and girls, which society forgets; denouncing, with her work, the mafias of trafficking, pornography and prostitution".
- 2021: The Civil Guard awarded her the Medal of Merit for her work against human trafficking.
- 2021: Received one of the EVAP awards in the category, Integrity Award. The awards are given by the Association of Businesswomen and Professionals of Valencia.
- 2021: Francisca de Pedraza Award against gender violence, granted by the Association of Progressive Women of Alcalá de Henares.
