= Arturo Cardelús =

Spanish-American composer

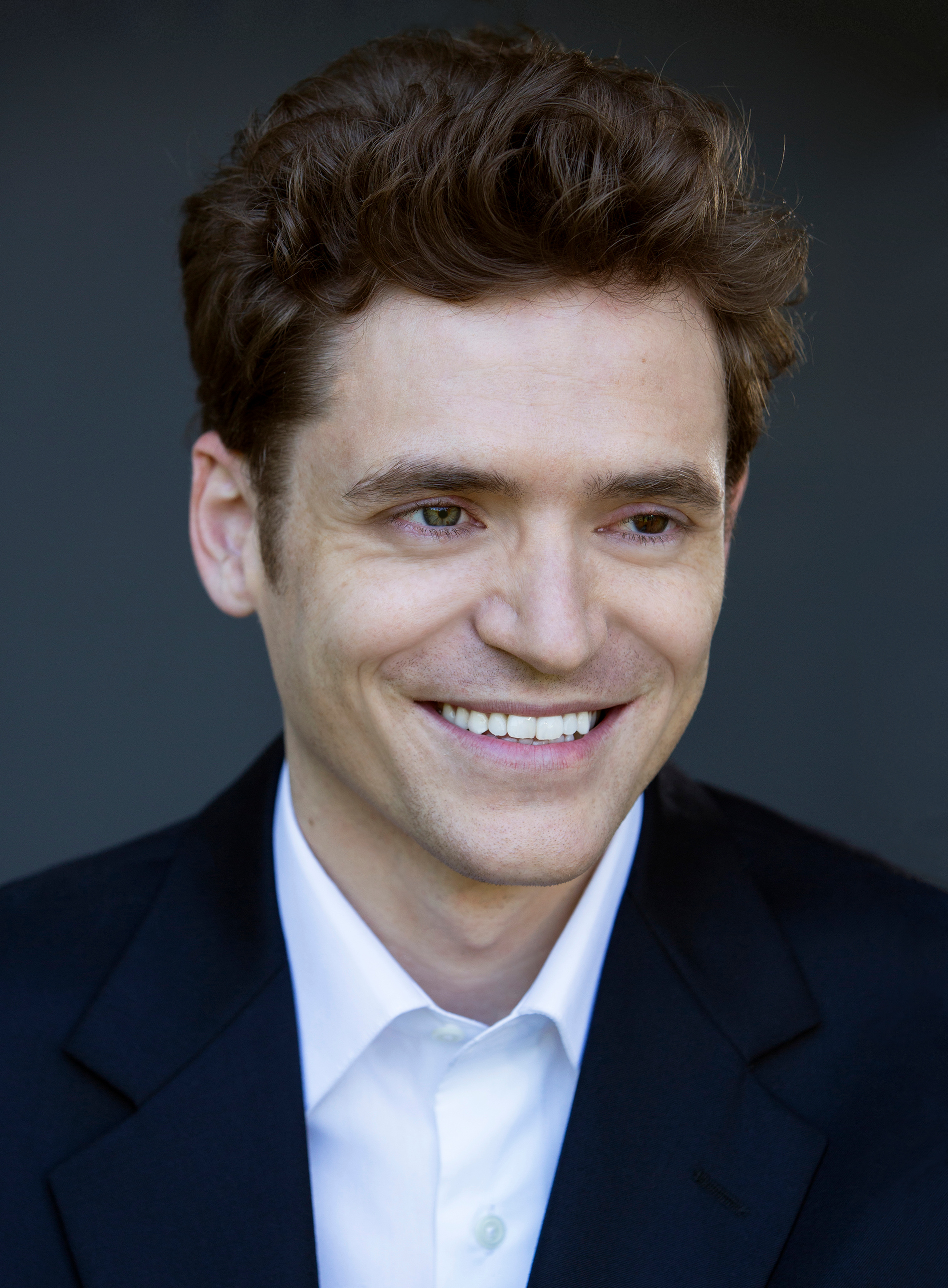
- Born: December 27, 1981 (age 44); Madrid, Spain
- Occupation: Composer

Arturo Cardelús (born 1981) is a Spanish-American composer of film and concert music. His scores for films Buñuel in the Labyrinth of the Turtles and Dragonkeeper have been nominated for Goya Awards.

== Biography ==
Cardelús was born in Madrid, Spain on December 27, 1981. He became an American citizen in 2019. He studied at the Conservatorio Superior de Música de Castilla y León, the Royal Academy of Music, the Franz Liszt Academy of Music, and Berklee College of Music.

In 2012, Cardelús orchestrated the score for the film The Paperboy. In 2015, he composed the soundtrack for the Italian film Chiamatemi Francesco. In 2017, Cardelús composed the soundtrack for the animated short In a Heartbeat, which went viral and attracted wide attention. The score won Best Original Score – Animated Short Film at the Hollywood Music in Media Awards.

In 2019, Cardelús scored the animated feature Buñuel in the Labyrinth of the Turtles. His music for the film won awards for best score at the 2019 Annecy International Animation Film Festival and the 2019 Málaga Film Festival. The score was also nominated for a Goya Award, a Feroz Award, and a Spanish Cinema Writers Circle Award for best original score, as well as for a Hollywood Music in Media Award and an International Film Music Critics Association Award for best original score in an animated film.

Following Buñuel in the Labyrinth of the Turtles, Cardelús continued to score projects in Spain and the United States. His subsequent credits include the Spanish thriller Black Beach (2020), the Disney television special Descendants: The Royal Wedding (2021), and the independent films Dylan & Zoey (2022), Back to Lyla (2022), and Centurion: The Dancing Stallion (2023). He also composed the score for the animated feature Dragonkeeper (2024), for which he was again nominated for a Goya Award. He composed the music for the 2025 miniseries Terra Alta, for which he received a Hollywood Music in Media Award. Cardelús also composed music for the immersive exhibition Frida Kahlo: The Life and Art of Frida Kahlo, for which he also received a Hollywood Music in Media Award (2022).

In classical music, Cardelús attracted national attention for his 2013 composition Con Aire de Tango, which was commissioned by members of the Berlin Philharmonic after they saw a video of his work on YouTube. Two years later, Naxos Records released an album of Cardelús' compositions. In 2016, Cardelús was elected Associate of the Royal Academy of Music (ARAM). His work Grace was nominated for a 2017 Hollywood Music in Media Award in the category Contemporary Classical/Instrumental. Works by Cardelús have been performed in venues including Madrid's National Auditorium and Boston's Jordan Hall.

Cardelús lives and works in Los Angeles.

== Select filmography ==
- The Paperboy (orchestrator) (2012)
- Tangernación (2013)
- War Is Beautiful (2014)
- Chiamatemi Francesco (2015)
- In a Heartbeat (2017) (short)
- Altamira, el origen del arte (2018)
- Yo Galgo (2018)
- Original Sin (2018)
- The People's Fighters (2018)
- On the Run (2018)
- Buñuel in the Labyrinth of the Turtles (2019)
- Aún se bendicen los campos (2019)
- Kalipay (2019)
- Black Beach (2020)
- Descendants: The Royal Wedding (TV special) (2021)
- Dylan & Zoey (2022)
- Los Reyes Magos: La Verdad (2022)
- Back to Lyla (2022)
- Centurion: The Dancing Stallion (2023)
- Dragonkeeper (2024)
- Semillas de Kivu (2024) (short)
- Terra Alta (2025) (miniseries)
- Wake (2026)
- Girl and Wolf (2026)

== Concert music discography ==
- Con Aire de Tango (Naxos Records, 2015)

== Awards and nominations ==
| Year | Film / work | Award | Category | Result |
|---|---|---|---|---|
| 2017 | In a Heartbeat | Hollywood Music in Media Awards | Best Original Score – Animated Short Film | Won |
| 2017 | Grace | Hollywood Music in Media Awards | Contemporary Classical/Instrumental | Nominated |
| 2018 | "Song for the Untitled" (Yo Galgo) | Hollywood Music in Media Awards | Best Original Song – Documentary | Nominated |
| 2019 | Buñuel in the Labyrinth of the Turtles | Annecy International Animation Film Festival | Best Original Music for a Feature Film | Won |
| 2019 | Buñuel in the Labyrinth of the Turtles | Málaga Film Festival | Best Music | Won |
| 2019 | Buñuel in the Labyrinth of the Turtles | Hollywood Music in Media Awards | Best Original Score – Animated Film | Nominated |
| 2020 | Buñuel in the Labyrinth of the Turtles | Cinema Writers Circle Awards | Best Original Score | Nominated |
| 2020 | Buñuel in the Labyrinth of the Turtles | Premios Feroz | Best Original Score | Nominated |
| 2020 | Buñuel in the Labyrinth of the Turtles | International Film Music Critics Association Awards | Best Original Score for an Animated Film | Nominated |
| 2020 | Buñuel in the Labyrinth of the Turtles | Goya Awards | Best Original Score | Nominated |
| 2021 | Black Beach | Hollywood Music in Media Awards | Best Original Score – Independent Film | Nominated |
| 2021 | Descendants: The Royal Wedding | Hollywood Music in Media Awards | Best Original Score – Animated Short Film | Nominated |
| 2022 | Frida Kahlo: An Immersive Exhibition | Hollywood Music in Media Awards | Best Original Score – Exhibition | Won |
| 2023 | Los Reyes Magos: La Verdad | Hollywood Music in Media Awards | Best Original Score – Independent Film (Foreign Language) | Nominated |
| 2024 | Dragonkeeper | Hollywood Music in Media Awards | Best Original Score – Animated film | Nominated |
| 2025 | Dragonkeeper | Goya Awards | Best Original Score | Nominated |
| 2025 | Terra Alta | Hollywood Music in Media Awards | Best Original Score – TV Show/Limited Series (Foreign Language) | Won |
