= Mauricio Aznar =

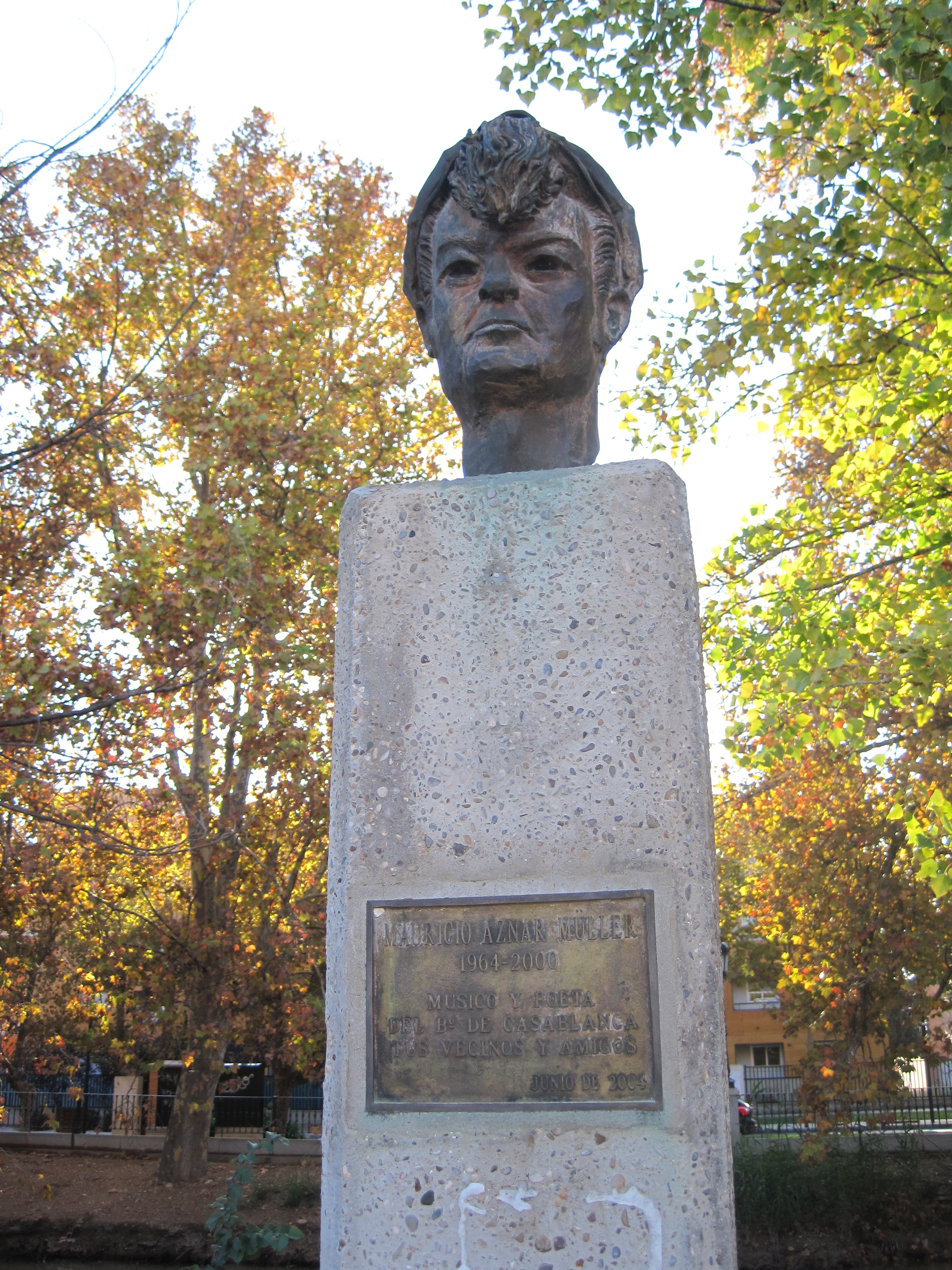

Background information
- Born: January 26, 1964
- Died: October 2, 2000 (aged 36)

Mauricio Aznar Müller (January 26, 1964 – October 2, 2000) was an Aragonese poet and musician, leader of the bands Golden Zippers, Más Birras and Almagato. Some of his songs, like «Apuesta por el rock and roll», popularized by Héroes del Silencio, have become part of the cultural heritage of rock made in Aragon.

His career begins with the founding of the group Golden Zippers in the 1980s, a rocker style (large toupees in James Dean style) and rockabilly music group. In 1983 he recorded a single with the Cara 2 label, which contained three songs.

In 1984 he created Más Birras, the group with which he would achieve solid prestige after Jesús Ordovás released in Radio 3 the song «Apuesta por el rock and roll», included in the maxisingle Al este del Moncayo (1987), written by Gabriel Sopeña and later popularized by Héroes del Silencio, which made it an Aragonese rock classic. Later, Más Birras edits the LPs Otra ronda (1988), La última traición (1990) and Tierra quemada (1992).

However, Mauricio Aznar began to get interested about Argentinian tango and other forms of their folklore, that combined to the not so successful last disc of Más Birras, led to the group dissolution in 1993.

In his last years, and as instigator of the Almagato group, together with Jaime González, he dedicated himself to spreading the folklore of Santiago del Estero and other regions of northwestern Argentina, cultivating genres such as chacareras, zambas or vidalas. He came into contact with the Carabajal family and in collaboration with Carlos Carabajal gave various concerts. in October 12, 2000, he died by drug overdose.

Before dying, he delivered a book with manuscripted poems to Javier Barreiro; and left around twenty unreleased songs composed with his close friend Gabriel Sopeña.

As a tribute, the city of Zaragoza, inaugurated a walkway with his name.

A tribute movie, La estrella azul, was released in 2023, starring Pepe Lorente as Aznar.
