= 4th Carmen Awards =

2025 Andalusian film awards

- Date: 1 February 2025
- Site: Gran Teatro, Córdoba, Andalusia, Spain
- Hosted by: Macarena Gómez; Antonio Pagudo
- Organized by: Andalusian Film Academy

Highlights
- Best Picture: Saturn Return
- Honorary career award: Antonio P. Pérez
- Best Actor: Pablo Gómez-Pando; Alone in the Night
- Best Actress: Beatriz Arjona; The Party's Over
- Most awards: Saturn Return (8)
- Most nominations: Alone in the Night (15)

Television coverage
- Network: Canal Sur

The 4th Carmen Awards ceremony, presented by the Andalusian Film Academy, took place on 1 February 2025 at the Gran Teatro in Córdoba.

== Background ==
The nominations were read on 17 December 2025 by actress Marisol Membrillo and actor Juan Carlos Villanueva from the Palacio de la Merced. In January 2025, Macarena Gómez and Antonio Pagudo were announced as the gala hosts. Producer Antonio Pérez received the Honorary Carmen Award. The gala featured musical performances by Vega, María Parrado, Merche, and El Pele.

== Winners and nominations ==
The winners and nominees are listed as follows:

Best Fiction Feature Film: Saturn Return; May I Speak with the Enemy?; Rita; Alone in the Night	Best Director: Alexis Morante — May I Speak with the Enemy?; Benito Zambrano — Jumping the Fence; Guillermo Rojas — Alone in the Night; Laura Alvea — The Sleeping Woman
Best Original Screenplay: Fernando Navarro — Saturn Return; Celia Rico — Little Loves; Guillermo Rojas — Alone in the Night; Paz Vega — Rita	Best Adapted Screenplay: Alexis Morante, Raúl Santos — May I Speak with the Enemy?; Marina Parés — The Last Romantics; Salva Martos — Reflejos en una habitación; Sandra Romero — As Silence Passes By
Best Actor: Pablo Gómez-Pando — Alone in the Night; Dani Rovira — The Bus of Life; Paco León — Babies Don't Come with Instructions; Salva Reina — Tu madre o la mía	Best Actress: Beatriz Arjona — The Party's Over; Carmina Barrios — Tu madre o la mía; Charo Reina — Intersex; Maggie Civantos — Stories; Natalia de Molina — Dismantling an Elephant
Best Supporting Actor: Antonio de la Torre — Glimmers; Alfonso Sánchez — Alone in the Night; Félix Gómez — Alone in the Night; Salva Reina — May I Speak with the Enemy?; Vicente Romero — May I Speak with the Enemy?	Best Supporting Actress: Adelfa Calvo — May I Speak with the Enemy?; Amada Santos — Rita; Beatriz Arjona — Alone in the Night; Paz Vega — Rita
Best New Actor: Cristalino — Saturn Return; Antonio Araque — As Silence Passes By; Fran Pérez — Alone in the Night; Javier Araque — As Silence Passes By	Best New Actress: Paz de Alarcón — Rita; Carmen Escudero — Birth; María Araque — As Silence Passes By; María Steelman — The Girls at the Station
Best New Director: Paz Vega — Rita; María Gisela Royo — On the Go; Miguel Olid — Summers, el rebelde; Sandra Romero — As Silence Passes By	Best Original Score: Pablo Cervantes — Rita; Isabel Royán — The Girls at the Station; Miguel Rivera — Atín Aya. Retrato del silencio; Pablo Onares — Summers, el rebelde
Best Original Song: "Fandango" by Rocío Márquez and José A. Mazo (Fandango); "Solos en la noche" by Miguel Rivera and Guillermo Rojas (Alone in the Night); "La vida no avisa" by Riki Rivera and Violetta Arriaza (Sin instrucciones); "Traviesa" by Sergio de la Puente (Family Affairs)	Best Cinematography: Álvaro Medina — The Blue Star; Alejandro Espadero — Alone in the Night; Fran Fernández — The Sleeping Woman; Luis Castilla — Fandango
Best Production Supervision: Sandra Rodríguez, Javier Mateos — Rita; Araceli Carrero — On the Go; Fidel Pérez — Alone in the Night; Manolo Limón — The Party's Over	Best Documentary Feature Film: Fandango; Atín Aya. Retrato del silencio; Sembrando sueños; Summers, el rebelde
Best Editing: Javier Frutos — Saturn Return; Ana Álvarez-Ossorio — Rita; Fátima de los Santos, José M.G. Moyano — The Sleeping Woman; José M.G. Moyano — May I Speak with the Enemy?	Best Costume Design: Lourdes Fuentes — Saturn Return; Esther Vaquero — Jumping the Fence; Fernando García — Rita; Rocío Olid — Alone in the Night
Best Sound: Daniel de Zayas, Jorge Martín — Rita; Antuán Mejías, Abraham F. Apresa, Poli Laclaustra — The Sleeping Woman; Coco Gollonet, Alonso Velasco, Francis Cortés — Fandango; Diana Sagrista — Saturn Return	Best Art Direction: Pepe Domínguez, Gigia Pellegrini — Saturn Return; Amanda Román — Rita; Beatriz López Herrerías — May I Speak with the Enemy?; Pilar Angulo — Alone in the Night
Best Makeup and Hairstyles: Yolanda Piña — Saturn Return; Anabel Beato, Gloria García — Alone in the Night; Rafael Mora, Ángela Moreno — Rita; Yolanda Piña, Félix Terrero — The Party's Over	Best Special Effects: María Magnet, Marian Delgado — Saturn Return; Amparo Martínez Barco — The Sleeping Woman; Joaquín Ortega, Amparo Martínez Barco — Alone in the Night; Luis Melga — Rita
Best Fiction Short Film: 7 formas de decir adiós; Carroña; La noche dentro; Tumbas vecinas	Best Documentary Short Film: Apuntes para Silvia; Camino Roya; Geranio; Mar, la libertad de hacer música
Best Animation Short Film: Estela; El cambio de rueda; Homework	Best Non-Andalusian Produced Film: The Blue Star; The 47; Undercover; Marco, the Invented Truth

=== Films with multiple nominations and awards ===
Films with multiple nominations
Nominations	Film
15	Alone in the Night
14	Rita
9	Saturn Return
8	May I Speak with the Enemy?
5	As Silence Passes By
5	The Sleeping Woman
4	Fandango
3	The Party's Over
3	Summers, el rebelde
2	The Blue Star
2	The Girls at the Station
2	Jumping the Fence
2	Tu madre o la mía
2	Sin instrucciones
2	Atín Aya. Retrato del silencio
2	On the Go

Films with multiple awards
Wins	Film
8	Saturn Return
5	Rita
3	May I Speak with the Enemy?
2	The Blue Star
2	Fandango
