= List of Spanish films of 2024 =

A list of Spanish-produced and co-produced feature films released in Spain in 2024. When applicable, the domestic theatrical release date is favoured.

== Films ==
Release		Title (Domestic title)	Cast & Crew	Distribution label	Ref.
J A N U A R Y	12	Valley of Shadows (Valle de sombras)	Director: Salvador Calvo Cast: Miguel Herrán, Susana Abaitua, Iván Renedo, Alexandra Masangkay, Stanzin Gombo, Morup Namgyal	Buena Vista International	
J A N U A R Y	12	Honeymoon	Director: Enrique Otero Cast: Javier Gutiérrez, Nathalie Poza, María Vázquez	Filmax	
J A N U A R Y	12	Palacio Estilistas	Director: Moisés Martín Cast: Goya Toledo, Carlos Hipólito, Lolita Flores, Pastora Vega, Juanma Lara, Ramiro Blas	Syldavia Cinema	
J A N U A R Y	19	The Courier (El correo)	Director: Daniel Calparsoro Cast: Arón Piper, María Pedraza, Luis Tosar, Luis Zahera, José Manuel Poga, Geert Van Rampelberg	Universal Pictures	(Note: Spain-France-Belgium co-production)
J A N U A R Y	19	The Monster of Many Noses (L'home dels nassos)	Director: Abigail Schaaff Cast: Pablo Derqui, Ivan Benet, Mercè Llorens, María Molins, Jeannine Mestre, Sali Diallo	Filmax	(Note: Spain-France co-production)
J A N U A R Y	26	Bad Hair Day (Un mal día lo tiene cualquiera)	Director: Eva Hache Cast: Ana Polvorosa, Goize Blanco, Aníbal Gómez, Ariana Martínez	Warner Bros. Pictures	
J A N U A R Y	26	Restless Waters, Shivering Lights (Faro)	Director: Ángeles Hernández Cast: Zoé Arnao, Hugo Silva, Sergio Castellanos	Alfa Pictures	(Note: Spain-Argentina co-production)
F E B R U A R Y	2	The Queen of the Abbey (La reina del convento)	Director: Carmen Perona Cast: Mario Vaquerizo, Isabel Ordaz, Gemma Cuervo, Antonia San Juan, Aída Domenech, María Alfonsa Rosso, Javier Hernández, Paz Padilla, Marisol Muriel, Gloria Ramos, África Esparducer, Pablo Liñares, Bibiana Fernández, El Monaguillo	Begin Again Films	
F E B R U A R Y	9	While You're Still You (Mientras seas tú)	Director: Claudia Pinto Cast: Carme Elías, Claudia Pinto, Juan Carlos Corazza	Filmax	
F E B R U A R Y	14	Idol Affair (Buscando a Coque)	Director: Teresa Bellón, César F. Calvillo Cast: Alexandra Jiménez, Hugo Silva, Coque Malla	Filmax	
F E B R U A R Y	14	Terapia de parejas	Director: Gaizka Urresti Cast: Rozalén, Marwán	—N/a	
F E B R U A R Y	15	Sembrando sueños	Director: Alfonso Sánchez Cast: Alberto López, Antonia Gómez, Alfonso Sánchez, Carmen Canivell	—N/a	
F E B R U A R Y	23	Políticamente incorrectos	Director: Arantxa Echevarría Cast: Adriana Torrebejano, Juanlu González, Gonzalo de Castro, María Hervás, Elena Irureta, Pepa Aniorte, Raúl Cimas	DeAPlaneta	
F E B R U A R Y	23	The Blue Star (La estrella azul)	Director: Javier Macipe Cast: Pepe Lorente, Cuti Carabajal, Bruna Cusí, Catalina Sopelana, Mariela Carabajal, Noelia Verenice Díaz	Wanda Visión	
F E B R U A R Y	23	Through My Window: Looking at You (A través de tu mirada)	Director: Marçal Forés Cast: Clara Galle, Julio Peña, Natalia Azahara, Hugo Arbués, Eric Masip, Emilia Lazo, Andrea Chaparro, Ivan Lapadula, Carla Tous	Netflix	
F E B R U A R Y	23	Close to Winter (Negu hurbilak)	Director: Colectivo Negu Cast: Jone Laspiur	Begin Again Films	
F E B R U A R Y	23	You Are Not Alone: Fighting the Wolf Pack (No estás sola: La lucha contra La Manada)	Director: Almudena Carracedo, Robert Bahar	Netflix	
F E B R U A R Y	24	Peleamos	Director: Noel Gálvez Cast: José Seda, Ángel Seda, José Peña Contreras, Antonio Zayas, Narciso Carmona	#ConUnPack	
M A R C H	1	Guadalupe: Madre de la Humanidad	Director: Andrés Garrigó, Pablo Moreno Cast: Alejandro Márquez, Pepe Vázquez, Karyme Lozano, Angélica Chong, Mario Alberto Hernández, Emilio Linder	European Dreams Factory	
M A R C H	8	Por tus muertos	Director: Sayago Ayuso Cast: José Mota, Jorge Sanz, Marta Belenguer, Carles Francino	Buena Vista International	
M A R C H	8	Little Loves (Los pequeños amores)	Director: Celia Rico Clavellino Cast: María Vázquez, Adriana Ozores, Aimar Vega	BTeam Pictures	
M A R C H	15	We Treat Women Too Well (Tratamos demasiado bien a las mujeres)	Director: Clara Bilbao Cast: Carmen Machi, Antonio de la Torre, Luis Tosar, Isak Férriz, Óscar Ladoire, Julián Villagrán, Diego Anido, Gonzalo de Castro	Filmax	
M A R C H	22	Uncle Trouble (La familia Benetón)	Director: Joaquín Mazón Cast: Leo Harlem, El Langui, Diana Bovio, Damián Alcázar	Beta Fiction	
M A R C H	22	Holy Mother (La abadesa)	Director: Antonio Chavarrías Cast: Daniela Brown, Blanca Romero, Carlos Cuevas	Wanda Visión	
M A R C H	27	A Hipster in Rural Spain (Un hipster en la España vacía)	Director: Emilio Martínez-Lázaro Cast: Lalo Tenorio, Berta Vázquez, Paco León, Macarena García	Prime Video	
A P R I L	5	Mathusalem (Matusalén)	Director: David Galán Galindo Cast: Julián López, Miren Ibarguren, Raúl Cimas, Antonio Resines	Flins y Piniculas	
A P R I L	5	Birds Flying East (Pájaros)	Director: Pau Durà Cast: Luis Zahera, Javier Gutiérrez, Teresa Saponangelo	Filmax	
A P R I L	12	Checkmates (Menudas piezas)	Director: Nacho García Velilla Cast: Alexandra Jiménez, María Adánez, Francesc Orella, Miguel Rellán, Luis Callejo	Paramount Pictures	
A P R I L	12	Jumping the Fence (El salto)	Director: Benito Zambrano Cast: Moussa Sylla, Edith Martínez Val, Eric Nantchouang, Nansi Nsue	Filmax	
A P R I L	12	Love, Divided (Pared con pared)	Director: Patricia Font Cast: Aitana, Fernando Guallar, Natalia Rodríguez, Adam Jezierski, Paco Tous, Miguel Ángel Muñoz	Netflix	
A P R I L	19	Dragonkeeper (Dragonkeeper (Guardiana de dragones))	Director: Salvador Simó, Li Jianping	A Contracorriente Films	(Note: Spain-China co-production)
A P R I L	26	Mamifera (Mamífera)	Director: Liliana Torres Cast: Maria Rodríguez Soto, Enric Auquer	Filmax	
M A Y	1	La casa	Director: Álex Montoya Cast: David Verdaguer, Óscar de la Fuente, Luis Callejo, Olivia Molina, María Romanillos, Lorena López, Marta Belenguer, Miguel Rellán, Tosca Montoya	A Contracorriente Films	
M A Y	10	Nina	Director: Andrea Jaurrieta Cast: Patricia López Arnaiz, Darío Grandinetti, Aina Picarolo	BTeam Pictures	
M A Y	10	As Neves	Director: Sonia Méndez Cast: Andrea Varela, David Rodríguez Fernández, Antía Mariño, Lucía Veiga	Sideral Cinema	
M A Y	17	Disco, Ibiza, Locomía	Director: Kike Maíllo Cast: Jaime Lorente, Alberto Ammann, Alejandro Speitzer, Iván Pellicer, Blanca Suárez	DeAPlaneta	
M A Y	17	Free Falling (Caída libre)	Director: Laura Jou Cast: Belén Rueda, Irene Escolar, Manuela Vellés, Ilay Kurelovic, María Netavrovana	Universal Pictures	
M A Y	17	The Quiet Maid (Calladita)	Director: Miguel Faus Cast: Paula Grimaldo, Ariadna Gil, Luis Bermejo, Pol Hermoso	Karma Films	
M A Y	17	A Bright Sun (Un sol radiant)	Director: Mònica Cambra, Ariadna Fortuny Cast: Laia Artigas, Nunu Sales, Núria Prims	Begin Again Films	
M A Y	24	Saturn Return (Segundo premio)	Director: Isaki Lacuesta, Pol Rodríguez Cast: Daniel Ibáñez, Cristalino, Stéphanie Magnin, Mafo	BTeam Pictures	
M A Y	24	Stories (Historias)	Director: Paco Sepúlveda Cast: Juan Diego, Fernando Tejero, Maggie Civantos, Eduardo Blanco, Aura Garrido, Luisa Gavasa	Vértice 360	
M A Y	31	The Sleeping Woman (La mujer dormida)	Director: Laura Alvea Cast: Almudena Amor, Javier Rey, Amanda Goldsmith	Filmax	
J U N E	14	La bandera	Director: Martín Cuervo Cast: Imanol Arias, Miquel Fernández, Aitor Luna, Ana Fernández	A Contracorriente Films	
J U N E	19	Birth (Alumbramiento)	Director: Pau Teixidor Cast: Sofía Milán, Celia Lopera, Carmen Escudero, Paula Agulló, Victoria Oliver, Alba Munuera, María Vázquez	Filmax	
J U N E	28	Invasión	Director: David Martín-Porras Cast: Claudia Salas, Fran Berenguer, Sofía Oria, Álvaro Rico, María Adánez, Andrés Gertrúdix	A Contracorriente Films	
J U N E	28	A House on Fire (Casa en flames)	Director: Dani de la Orden Cast: Emma Vilarasau, Enric Auquer, Maria Rodríguez Soto, Macarena García	VerCine	
J U N E	28	On the Go	Director: María Gisèle Royo, Julia de Castro Cast: Omar Ayuso, Chacha Huang, Julia de Castro, Manuel de Blas	—N/a	
J U L Y	3	Mean Streak (Mala persona)	Director: Fernando García-Ruiz Cast: Arturo Valls, Malena Alterio, Julián Villagrán, José Corbacho	Filmax	
J U L Y	3	The Bus of Life (El bus de la vida)	Director: Ibon Cormenzana Cast: Dani Rovira, Susana Abaitua, Elena Irureta, Andrés Gertrúdix, Antonio Durán "Morris"	A Contracorriente Films	
J U L Y	3	Blondi	Director: Dolores Fonzi Cast: Dolores Fonzi, Carla Peterson, Rita Cortese, Leonardo Sbaraglia, Toto Rovito	Karma Films	
J U L Y	12	The Champion (El campeón)	Director: Carlos Therón Cast: Marcel Serrano, Dani Rovira, Pablo Chiapella, Luis Fernández	Netflix	
J U L Y	12	The Major Tones (Los tonos mayores)	Director: Ingrid Pokropek Cast: Sofía Clausen, Pablo Seijo, Lina Ziccarello, Santiago Ferreira, Mercedes Halfon	39 Escalones Films	
J U L Y	17	Father There Is Only One 4 (Padre no hay más que uno 4)	Director: Santiago Segura Cast: Santiago Segura, Toni Acosta, Martina D'Antiochia, Calma Segura, Luna Fulgencio, Carlos G. Morollón, Sirena Segura, Blanca Ramírez, Leo Harlem, Silvia Abril, Loles León, El Cejas, Carlos Iglesias	Sony Pictures	
J U L Y	17	Werewolf (Llobàs)	Director: Pau Calpe Cast: León Martínez, Pol López, Maria Rodríguez Soto	Alfa Pictures	
J U L Y	25	Norberta	Director: Sonia Escolano, Belén López Albert Cast: Luis Bermejo, Adriana Ozores, Mariona Terés, María Romanillos	Filmax	
A U G U S T	2	Tu madre o la mía: Guerra de suegras	Director: Chus Gutiérrez Cast: Carmina Barrios, Salva Reina, Paulina Goto	A Contracorriente Films	
A U G U S T	9	Cuerpo escombro	Director: Curro Velázquez Cast: Dani Rovira, Ernesto Sevilla, Cassandra Ciangherotti, El Langui, Omar Chaparro	Buena Vista International	
A U G U S T	14	Buffalo Kids	Director: Juan Jesús García Galocha, Pedro Solís	Warner Bros. Pictures	
A U G U S T	14	A Commonplace (Un lugar común)	Director: Celia Giraldo Cast: Eva Llorach, Mia Sala-Patau, Félix Pons	Alfa Pictures	
A U G U S T	23	Haunted Heart (Isla perdida)	Director: Fernando Trueba Cast: Aida Folch, Matt Dillon, Juan Pablo Urrego	BTeam Pictures	
A U G U S T	23	I Hate Summer (Odio el verano)	Director: Fernando García-Ruiz Cast: Roberto Álamo, Malena Alterio, Jordi Sánchez, María Botto, Julián López, Kira Miró	Sony Pictures	
A U G U S T	30	The Other Way Around (Volveréis)	Director: Jonás Trueba Cast: Itsaso Arana, Vito Sanz	Elastica	
S E P T E M B E R	6	The 47 (El 47)	Director: Marcel Barrena Cast: Eduard Fernández, Clara Segura, Zoe Bonafonte, Salva Reina, Carlos Cuevas, Betsy Túrnez, David Verdaguer	A Contracorriente Films	
S E P T E M B E R	6	Last Stop: Rocafort St. (Estación Rocafort)	Director: Luis Prieto Cast: Natalia Azahara, Javier Gutiérrez, Valèria Sorolla	Filmax	
S E P T E M B E R	6	Reinas	Director: Klaudia Reynicke Cast: Abril Gjurinovic, Luana Vega, Jimena Lindo, Gonzalo Molina, Susi Sánchez	BTeam Pictures	
S E P T E M B E R	13	Artificial Justice (Justicia artificial)	Director: Simón Casal Cast: Verónica Echegui, Alberto Ammann, Tamar Novas, Alba Galocha	A Contracorriente Films	
S E P T E M B E R	13	Hotel Bitcoin	Director: Manuel Sanabria, Carlos Villaverde Cast: Alejo Sauras, Canco Rodríguez, Mauricio Ochmann, Pablo Chiapella, Marta Hazas, Leonor Lavado, Vanesa Romero	DeAPlaneta	
S E P T E M B E R	13	I'll Crush Y'all (Os reviento)	Director: Kike Narcea Cast: Mario Mayo, Fernando Gil, Diego París, Fabia Castro, Raúl Jiménez, Ana Márquez, Antonio Mayans, Lone Fleming	The Other Side Films	
S E P T E M B E R	20	Ellipsis (Puntos suspensivos)	Director: David Marqués Cast: Diego Peretti, José Coronado, Cecilia Suárez, Georgina Amorós	Vértice 360	
S E P T E M B E R	20	Alone in the Night (Solos en la noche)	Director: Guillermo Rojas Cast: Pablo Gómez Pando, Andrea Carballo, Beatriz Arjona, Félix Gómez, Alfonso Sánchez, Paula Usero	Summer Films	
S E P T E M B E R	20	Fraternity (El aspirante)	Director: Juan Gautier Cast: Lucas Nabor, Jorge Motos, Eduardo Rosa, Catalina Sopelana	Begin Again Films	
S E P T E M B E R	27	I'm Nevenka (Soy Nevenka)	Director: Icíar Bollaín Cast: Mireia Oriol, Urko Olazabal, Ricardo Gómez, Carlos Serrano, Lucía Veiga	Buena Vista International	
S E P T E M B E R	27	The Red Virgin (La virgen roja)	Director: Paula Ortiz Cast: Najwa Nimri, Alba Planas, Aixa Villagrán, Patrick Criado, Pepe Viyuela	Elastica	
O C T O B E R	4	The Platform 2 (El hoyo 2)	Director: Galder Gaztelu-Urrutia Cast: Milena Smit, Hovik Keuchkerian	Netflix	
O C T O B E R	4	Most People Die on Sundays (Los domingos mueren más personas)	Director: Iair Said Cast: Rita Cortese, Iair Said, Juliana Gattas, Antonia Zegers	Sherlock Films	
O C T O B E R	4	Glimmers (Los destellos)	Director: Pilar Palomero Cast: Patricia López Arnaiz, Antonio de la Torre, Julián López, Marina Guerola	Caramel Films	
O C T O B E R	11	Undercover (La infiltrada)	Director: Arantxa Echevarría Cast: Carolina Yuste, Luis Tosar, Nausicaa Bonnín	Beta Fiction	
O C T O B E R	18	The Room Next Door (La habitación de al lado)	Director: Pedro Almodóvar Cast: Tilda Swinton, Julianne Moore, John Turturro, Alessandro Nivola, Juan Diego Botto, Raúl Arévalo, Melina Matthews, Victoria Luengo	Warner Bros. Pictures	
O C T O B E R	18	Valenciana	Director: Jordi Núñez Cast: Ángela Cervantes, Tània Fortea, Conchi Espejo, Fernando Guallar, Sandra Cervera	Carácter Films	
O C T O B E R	25	The Wailing (El llanto)	Director: Pedro Martín-Calero Cast: Ester Expósito, Mathilde Ollivier, Malena Villa, Àlex Monner	Universal Pictures	
O C T O B E R	25	Rita	Director: Paz Vega Cast: Sofía Allepuz, Alejandro Escamilla, Paz Vega, Roberto Álamo	Filmax	
O C T O B E R	31	Escape	Director: Rodrigo Cortés Cast: Mario Casas, Anna Castillo, José Garcia, José Sacristán, Blanca Portillo, Guillermo Toledo,	Beta Fiction	
O C T O B E R	31	Yo no soy esa	Director: María Ripoll Cast: Verónica Echegui, Silma López, Daniel Grao, Adam Jezierski	Sony Pictures	
O C T O B E R	31	Salve Maria	Director: Mar Coll Cast: Laura Weissmahr, Oriol Pla	Elastica	
O C T O B E R	31	Apocalypse Z: The Beginning of the End (Apocalipsis Z: El principio del fin)	Director: Carles Torrens Cast: Francisco Ortiz, Berta Vázquez, Iria del Río	Prime Video	
N O V E M B E R	8	Marco, the Invented Truth (Marco, la verdad inventada)	Director: Aitor Arregi, Jon Garaño Cast: Eduard Fernández, Nathalie Poza	BTeam Pictures	
N O V E M B E R	8	Family Affairs (Verano en diciembre)	Director: Carolina África Cast: Lola Cordón, Carmen Machi, Bárbara Lennie, Victoria Luengo, Beatriz Grimaldos	Vértigo Films	
N O V E M B E R	8	Anathema (Anatema)	Director: Jimina Sabadú Cast: Leonor Watling, Pablo Derqui, Keren Hapuc, Jaime Ordóñez	Sony Pictures	
N O V E M B E R	8	Samana Sunrise (Amanece en Samaná)	Director: Rafa Cortés Cast: Luis Tosar, Luis Zahera, Luisa Mayol, Bárbara Santa-Cruz, Charles Dance	Universal Pictures	
N O V E M B E R	15	They Will Be Dust (Polvo serán)	Director: Carlos Marques-Marcet Cast: Ángela Molina, Alfredo Castro, Mònica Almirall	Elastica	
N O V E M B E R	15	Close to the Sultan (En la alcoba del sultán)	Director: Javier Rebollo Cast: Félix Moati, Iliès Kadri, Jan Budař, Pilar López de Ayala, Farouk Saïdi	Sideral Cinema	
N O V E M B E R	15	The Last Romantics (Azken erromantikoak)	Director: David Pérez Sañudo Cast: Miren Gaztañaga, Maica Barroso, Eric Probanza	A Contracorriente Films	
N O V E M B E R	22	Raqqa: Spy vs. Spy (Raqa)	Director: Gerardo Herrero Cast: Álvaro Morte, Mina El Hammani, Abdelatif Hwidar	DeAPlaneta	
N O V E M B E R	22	The Girls at the Station (Las chicas de la estación)	Director: Juana Macías Cast: Julieta Tobío, Salua Hadra, María Steelman	A Contracorriente Films	
N O V E M B E R	29	Ask Me What You Want (Pídeme lo que quieras)	Director: Lucía Alemany Cast: Gabriela Andrada, Mario Ermito, Paco Tous, David Solans, Celia Freijeiro, Alba Ribas, Joel Bosqued	Warner Bros. Pictures	
N O V E M B E R	29	Guilty Attraction (Desmontando a Lucía)	Director: Alberto Utrera Cast: Susana Abaitua, Hugo Silva, Julián Villagrán	Tripictures	
N O V E M B E R	29	As Silence Passes By (Por donde pasa el silencio)	Director: Sandra Romero Cast: Antonio Araque, Javier Araque, Mona Martínez	BTeam Pictures	
N O V E M B E R	29	Gold Lust (Escanyapobres)	Director: Ibai Abad Cast: Alex Brendemühl, Mireia Vilapuig	Carácter Films	
D E C E M B E R	5	Who Is Who? (¿Quién es quién?)	Director: Martín Cuervo Cast: Salva Reina, Kira Miró, Elena Irureta, Sofía Otero	DeAPlaneta	
D E C E M B E R	5	From Good to the Hood (Al otro barrio)	Director: Mar Olid Cast: Quim Gutiérrez, Sara Sálamo, María de Nati, Javier Herrera, Jorge Suquet, Francesc Orella, Carlos Librado "Nene"	Buena Vista International	
D E C E M B E R	5	The Bond (La fianza)	Director: Gonzalo Perdomo Cast: Juana Acosta, Israel Elejalde, Julián Román	Syldavia Cinema	
D E C E M B E R	5	SuperKlaus	Director: Steve Majaury, Andrea Sebastiá	Filmax	
D E C E M B E R	13	May I Speak with the Enemy? (¿Es el enemigo? La película de Gila)	Director: Alexis Morante Cast: Óscar Lasarte, Carlos Cuevas, Natalia de Molina, Salva Reina, Adelfa Calvo, Vicente Romero	Filmax	
D E C E M B E R	13	You Are Not Me (Tú no eres yo)	Director: Marisa Crespo, Moisés Romera Cast: Roser Tapias, Jorge Motos, Alfred Picó, Pilar Almería, Yaopena Silva	Carácter Films	
D E C E M B E R	20	Un lío de millones	Director: Susan Béjar Cast: Antonio Resines, Gracia Olayo, Alberto Olmo, Itzan Escamilla, Lucía Caraballo, Raúl Cimas, Clara Lago	Sony Pictures	
D E C E M B E R	20	The Flamenco Guitar of Yerai Cortés (La guitarra flamenca de Yerai Cortés)	Director: Antón Álvarez	A Contracorriente Films	
D E C E M B E R	25	Babies Don't Come with Instructions (Sin instrucciones)	Director: Marina Seresesky Cast: Paco León, Silvia Alonso, Maia Zaitegi	Warner Bros. Pictures	
D E C E M B E R	27	Your Fault (Culpa tuya)	Director: Domingo González Cast: Nicole Wallace, Gabriel Guevara, Marta Hazas, Iván Sánchez	Prime Video	

== Box office ==
The ten highest-grossing Spanish films in 2024, by in-year domestic box office gross revenue, were as follows:

Highest-grossing films of 2024
Rank	Title	Distributor	Admissions	Domestic gross (€)
1	Father There Is Only One 4 (Padre no hay más que uno 4)	Sony Pictures	2,179,045	13,442,979
2	Undercover (La infiltrada)	Beta Fiction	1,274,000	8,108,000
3	Buffalo Kids	Warner Bros. Pictures	837,070	5,226,939
4	I Hate Summer (Odio el verano)	Sony Pictures	818,250	5,211,627
5	Uncle Trouble (La familia Benetón)	Beta Fiction	622,534	4,067,728
6	A Moroccan Affair (Ocho apellidos marroquís) ‡	Universal Pictures	483,445	3,286,882
7	The 47 (El 47)	A Contracorriente Films	501,667	3,228,506
8	A House on Fire (Casa en flames)	Vercine	456,805	3,068,687
9	Checkmates (Menudas piezas)	Paramount Pictures	387,581	2,546,827
10	The Room Next Door (La habitación de al lado)	Warner Bros. Pictures	395,778	2,430,999
‡: 2023 theatrical opening

== See also ==
- 39th Goya Awards
- List of 2024 box office number-one films in Spain
