= Birth (2024 film) =

- Theatrical release poster
- Spanish: Alumbramiento
- Directed by: Pau Teixidor
- Written by: Pau Teixidor; Lorena Iglesias
- Produced by: Pedro Hernández Santos; Francesc Escribano; Vlad Rădulescu
- Starring: Sofía Milán; Celia Lopera; Carmen Escudero; Paula Agulló; Victoria Oliver; Alba Munuera
- Cinematography: Pepe Gay de Liébana
- Edited by: Mamen Díaz; Pedro Collantes
- Music by: Petre Bog
- Production companies: Aquí y Allí Films; Minoria Absoluta; Alumbramiento AIE; Avanpost
- Distributed by: Filmax
- Release dates: 24 April 2024 (BCN Film Fest); 19 June 2024 (Spain)
- Countries: Spain; Romania
- Language: Spanish

Birth (Spanish: Alumbramiento) is a 2024 Spanish-Romanian drama film directed by Pau Teixidor and written by Teixidor and Lorena Iglesias. It stars Sofía Milán alongside María Vázquez.

== Plot ==
The plot is set in 1982 Spain, against the backdrop of the country's purported political and social change. Pregnant Lucía is taken by her mother Marisa to a Catholic reformatory for teen pregnant women in Peñagrande, where she develops a strong friendship with other young women, while becoming the target of a baby theft ring centered in the reformatory.

== Cast ==
- Sofía Milán as Lucía
- Celia Lopera as Inma
- Carmen Escudero as Lola
- Paula Agulló as Candela
- Victoria Oliver as Rosa
- Alba Munuera as Maika
- Elisabet Hereu as Teresa
- Miriam Rubio as Maribel
- Claudia Pellicer as Maria
- Andere Garabieta as Begoña
- Laura Gómez Lacueva as Señorita Pura
- Malena Gutiérrez as Sor María
- Loles Gutiérrez as Sor Rocío
- María Vázquez as Marisa

== Production ==
The film is a Spanish-Romanian co-production by Aquí y Allí Films, Minoria Absoluta, Alumbramiento AIE and Avanpost. It had the participation of RTVE and backing from ICAA and Ayuntamiento de Madrid. Shooting locations included Madrid.

== Release ==
The film was presented at the 8th BCN Film Fest on 24 April 2024. Distributed by Filmax, it is scheduled to be released theatrically in Spain on 19 June 2024.

== Reception ==
Enid Román Almansa of Cinemanía rated the film 4 out of 5 stars, considering it to be "emotional, hard, beautiful and tremendously necessary" in the verdict.

Manuel J. Lombardo of Diario de Sevilla gave the film 3 stars, mentioning the time setting, the extraordinary mise-en-scene and the fitting cast of young actresses as some of the merits in it.

Javier Ocaña of El País deemed the film to be a "modest but laudable work", lacking nonetheless "that touch of ambition" that turns movies into something else.

Juan Pando of Fotogramas rated the film 4 out of 5 stars writing that "the youth cast, perfectly matched, is exceptional".

Raquel Hernández Luján of HobbyConsolas gave the film 75 points ('good'), adding that it "demystifies the 1980s by pointing out their contradictions".

== Accolades ==
Year	Award	Category	Nominee(s)	Result	Ref.
2024	8th BCN Film Fest	Best Director	Pau Teixidor	Won	
2024	8th BCN Film Fest	Best Actress	Young Actresses Cast (Sofía Milán, Celia Lopera, Carmen Escudero, Paula Agulló, Victoria Oliver, Alba Munuera)	Won	
2025	4th Carmen Awards	Best New Actress	Carmen Escudero	Nominated	

== See also ==
- List of Spanish films of 2024
