= Restless Waters, Shivering Lights =

- Film poster
- Spanish: Faro
- Directed by: Ángeles Hernández
- Screenplay by: David Matamoros; Ángeles Hernández; José Pérez; Álvaro Urtizberea
- Produced by: David Matamoros; Ángeles Hernández
- Starring: Hugo Silva; Zoé Arnao; Sergio Castellanos; Irene Montalà; María Ribera; Carles Cuevas; Noelia Balbo
- Cinematography: Gina Ferrer García
- Edited by: Elena Ruiz
- Music by: Víctor Reyes
- Production companies: Mr. Miyagi Films; Vista Sur
- Distributed by: Alfa Pictures
- Release dates: 12 December 2023 (Cine Onimax); 26 January 2024 (Spain)
- Countries: Spain; Argentina
- Language: Spanish

Restless Waters, Shivering Lights (Spanish: Faro) is a 2023 Spanish-Argentine supernatural horror drama film directed by Ángeles Hernández which stars Hugo Silva and Zoé Arnao.

== Plot ==
The plot tracks father Pablo and daughter Lidia after the death of Lidia's mother and ensuing Lidia's suicide attempt. Coping with grief, they settled in an old family lighthouse, forcing Lidia to confront haunting nightmares, while a local family member bursts on the scene sowing discord.

== Cast ==
- Hugo Silva as Pablo
- Zoé Arnao as Lidia
- Sergio Castellanos
- Irene Montalà
- María Ribera
- Carles Cuevas
- Noelia Balbo

== Production ==
The film is a Spanish-Argentine co-production by Mr. Miyagi Films alongside Vista Sur, with backing from INCAA, ICAA, ICEC, IB3, Mallorca Film Commission and Consell de Turismo de Menorca. Shooting locations included Menorca, Terrassa, Sant Pere de Ribes, and Mallorca.

== Release ==
The film received a pre-screening at Cine Ocimax in Mahón on 12 December 2023. Distributed by Alfa Pictures, it will be released theatrically in Spain on 26 January 2024. Argentina-based FilmSharks handled international sales.

== Reception ==
Javier Ocaña of Cinemanía rated the film 2½ out of stars, writing that the story "waters on too many flanks with its skeletal and unfocused script".

== See also ==
- List of Spanish films of 2024
