= 72nd San Sebastián International Film Festival =

2024 film festival

- Official poster by José Luis Lanzagorta featuring Cate Blanchett
- Opening film: Emmanuelle
- Closing film: We Live In Time
- Location: San Sebastián, Spain
- Awards: Golden Shell: Afternoons of Solitude
- Directors: José Luis Rebordinos
- Festival date: 20–28 September 2024

San Sebastián International Film Festival
- 73rd 71st

The 72nd San Sebastián International Film Festival took place from 20 to 28 September 2024 in San Sebastián, Gipuzkoa, Spain.

== Background ==
A restored 4K version of Montxo Armendariz's film Tasio (which premiered at the 1984 San Sebastián Film Festival) was announced to be part of the 'Klasikoak' slate. Audrey Diwan's Emmanuelle was later revealed to be the festival's opening film, as well as part of the official selection's competitive lineup. 2023 Donostia Award winner Javier Bardem is expected to receive the award in 2024, as the 2023 SAG-AFTRA strike prevented him from attending the 71st festival. On 9 May 2024, the festival's organization unveiled the official poster for the 72nd edition; it features Donostia Award winner Cate Blanchett and it was designed by José Luis Lanzagorta based on a black and white photograph by Gustavo Papaleo. On 12 July 2024, the Academy of Cinematographic Arts and Sciences of Spain disclosed the 17 Spanish-produced titles which are to be part of the festival slate. On 14 August 2024, filmmaker Pedro Almodóvar was announced as the recipient of another Donostia Award. In September 2024, We Live In Time was announced as the festival's closing film, in a non-competitive slot. On 17 September 2024, the official selection jury was announced.

== Juries ==
=== Main Competition ===
- Jaione Camborda, Spanish film director and screenwriter – Jury president
- Leila Guerriero, Argentine journalist and writer
- Ulrich Seidl, Austrian film director, writer and producer
- Chrístos Níkou, Greek film director, writer and producer
- Carole Scotta, French film producer and distributor
- Fran Kranz, American actor and film director

=== Kutxabank-New Directors Award ===
- Philippe Bober, French film producer – Jury president
- Izibene Oñederra, Spanish film director and screenwriter
- Eduardo Crespo, Argentine film director
- Aulona Selmani, Swizz film director, writer and actress
- Jessica Kiang, Irish film critic, essayist and programmer

=== Latin Horizons ===
- Fernando Enrique Juan Lima, Argentine film critic and former director of the Mar del Plata International Film Festival – Jury president
- Pedro Fernandez Santos, Spanish film producer
- Valentina Maurel, Costa-Rican film director and writer

=== Zabaltegi-Tabakalera Award ===
- Emilie Bujès, French festival programmer and art director for Visions du Réel – Jury president
- Santiago Loza, Argentine film director and writer
- Hrönn Kristinsdóttir, Icelandic film producer

=== Irizar Basque Film Award ===
- Itziar Lazkano, Spanish actress and theatre director – Jury president
- Joseba Lopezortega, Spanish historian and director of the Bilbao International Festival of Documentary and Short Film (ZINEBI)
- Izaskun Rodríguez, Spanish journalist and professor

== Sections ==
=== Official selection ===
The official selection slate includes the following pictures:

==== In competition ====
Highlighted title indicates award winner.

English title	Original title	Director(s)	Production country(ies)
Bound in Heaven	捆绑上天堂	Huo Xin	China
Conclave		Edward Berger	Germany
Emmanuelle		Audrey Diwan	France
The End		Joshua Oppenheimer	Denmark; Germany; Ireland; Italy
Glimmers	Los destellos	Pilar Palomero	Spain
Hard Truths		Mike Leigh	United Kingdom; Spain
The Man Who Loved UFOs	El hombre que amaba los platos voladores	Diego Lerman	Argentina
Last Breath	Le dernier souffle	Costa-Gavras	France
The Last Showgirl		Gia Coppola	United States
In Her Place	El lugar de la otra	Maite Alberdi	Chile
I'm Nevenka	Soy Nevenka	Icíar Bollaín	Spain
On Falling		Laura Carreira	United Kingdom; Portugal
Serpent's Path	Hebi no Michi	Kiyoshi Kurosawa	Japan; France
Afternoons of Solitude	Tardes de soledad	Albert Serra	Spain; France; Portugal
The Wailing	El llanto	Pedro Martín-Calero	Spain; France; Argentina
When Fall Is Coming	Quand vient l'automne	François Ozon	France

==== Out of Competition ====
English title	Original title	Director(s)	Production country(ies)
Querer (TV series)		Alauda Ruiz de Azúa	Spain
Modì, Three Days on the Wing of Madness		Johnny Depp	United Kingdom; Hungary; Italy
We Live in Time		John Crowley	United Kingdom
Special Screenings
I, Addict (TV series)	Yo, adicto	Javier Giner, Elena Trapé	Spain
Lumiere! The adventure continues	Lumière!, l'aventure continue	Thierry Frémaux	
The Red Virgin	La virgen roja	Paula Ortiz	United States; Spain

=== New Directors ===
The New Directors slate includes:

English title	Original title	Director(s)	Production country(ies)
The Flamenco Guitar of Yerai Cortés	La guitarra flamenca de Yerai Cortés	Antón Álvarez	Spain
The Last Romantics	Azken erromantikoak	David Pérez Sañudo	Spain
Bagger Drama		Piet Baumgartner	Switzerland
In the Name of Blood	Brûle le sang	Akaki Popkhadze	France; Belgium; Austria
Gulizar	Gülizar	Belkis Bayrak	Turkey; Kosovo
Winter in Sokcho	Hiver à Sokcho	Koya Kamura	France; South Korea
Surfacing	La llegada del hijo	Cecilia Atán, Valeria Pivato	Spain; Argentina
My Eternal Summer	Min evige sommer	Sylvia Le Fanu	Denmark
As Silence Passes By	Por donde pasa el silencio	Sandra Romero	Spain
Regretfully at Dawn		Sivaroj Kongsakul	Thailand
Stars and the Moon		Yongkang Tang	China
Turn Me On		Michael Tyburski	United States

=== Latin Horizons (Horizontes Latinos) ===
The Latin Horizons slate includes the following films:

English title	Original title	Director(s)	Production country(ies)
Beloved Tropic	Querido trópico	Ana Endara	Panama; Colombia
Cidade; Campo		Juliana Rojas	Brazil; Germany; France
The Freshly Cut Grass	El aroma del pasto recién cortado	Celina Murga	Argentina; Uruguay; United States; Mexico; Germany
Kill the Jockey	El jockey	Luis Ortega	Argentina; Mexico; Spain; Denmark; United States
Maybe It's True What They Say About Us	Quizás es cierto lo que dicen de nosotras	Sofía Paloma Gómez, Camilo Becerra	Chile; Argentina; Spain
Most People Die on Sundays	Los domingos mueren más personas	Iair Said	Argentina; Italy; Spain
Ramón and Ramón	Ramón y Ramón	Salvador del Solar	Peru; Spain; Uruguay
Reas		Lola Arias	Argentina; Germany; Switzerland
Skin in Spring	La piel en primavera	Yennifer Uribe Alzate	Colombia; Chile
Simon of the Mountain	Simón de la montaña	Federico Luis	Argentina; Chile; Uruguay; Mexico
Sleep With Your Eyes Open	Dormir de olhos abertos	Nele Wohlatz	Brazil; Argentina; Taiwan; Germany
Sujo		Astrid Rondero, Fernanda Valadez	Mexico; United States; France
When Clouds Hide the Shadow	Cuando las nubes esconden las sombras	José Luis Torres Leiva	Chile; Argentina; South Korea
Zafari		Mariana Rondón	Peru; Venezuela; Mexico; France; Brazil; Chile; Dominican Republic

=== Zabaltegi-Tabakalera ===
The Zabaltegi-Tabakalera section includes:

English title	Original title	Director(s)	Production countrie(s)
Across the Waters		Viv Li	France
April	Aprili	Dea Kulumbegashvili	France; Italy; Georgia
Big Shadow	Sombra grande	Maximiliano Schonfeld	Argentina
Collective Monologue	Monólogo colectivo	Jessica Sarah Rinland	Argentina
Dahomey		Mati Diop	France
Every You Every Me	Alle Die Du Bist	Michael Fetter Nathansky	Germany; Spain
Filmlovers!	Spectateurs !	Arnaud Desplechin	France
Here Comes the Sun	Yao yuan de xia wu	Wu Lang	China
How to Be Pehuén Pedre	Cómo ser Pehuén Pedre	Federico Luis	Argentina; Germany
Hymn of the Plague	Gimn chume	Ataka51	Germany; Russia
It's Not Me	C'est pas moi	Leos Carax	France
Leela		Tanmay Chowdhary	India
Milky White	Nai niu	YoYo Liu	China
My Sunshine	ぼくのお日さま	Hiroshi Okuyama	Japan; France
Pepe		Nelson Carlo de Los Santos Arias	Dominican Republic; France; Germany; Namibia
Soundtrack to a Coup d'Etat		Johan Grimonprez	Belgium; France
Southern Brides	Las novias del sur	Elena López Riera	Spain; Switzerland
Super Happy Forever		Kohei Igarashi	France; Japan
To a Land Unknown		Mahdi Fleifel	Reino Unido; Palestine; France; Greece; Netherlands; Germany; Qatar; United Arab Emirates
Ulysses		Hikaru Uwagawa	Japan; Spain
When It Comes (It Will Have Your Eyes)	Etorriko da (Eta zure begiak izango ditu)	Izibene Oñederra	Spain
Where Time Stood Still	Sadac dro idga	Nino Benashvili	Georgia; United States; Canada

=== Perlak ===
The 'Perlak' section includes:

Highlighted title indicates City of Donostia / San Sebastián Audience Award winner.
Highlighted title indicates City of Donostia / San Sebastián Audience Award for Best European Film winner.

English title	Original title	Director(s)	Production countrie(s)
Apocalypse in the Tropics		Petra Costa	Brazil
Emilia Pérez (opening film)		Jacques Audiard	France
Marco (closing film, out of competition)		Jon Garaño, Aitor Arregi	Spain
I'm Still Here	Ainda Estou Aqui	Walter Salles	Brazil; France
All We Imagine as Light		Payal Kapadia	France; India; Netherlands; Luxembourg
Anora		Sean Baker	United States
Bird		Andrea Arnold	United Kingdom
The Seed of the Sacred Fig	دانه‌ی انجیر معابد	Mohammad Rasoulof	Iran; Germany; France
The Marching Band	En fanfare	Emmanuel Courcol	France
Megalopolis		Francis Ford Coppola	United States
Memoir of a Snail		Adam Elliot	Australia
Oh, Canada		Paul Schrader	United States
Parthenope		Paolo Sorrentino	Italy; France
The Substance		Coralie Fargeat	United Kingdom
A Traveler's Needs	여행자의 필요	Hong Sangsoo	South Korea
Maria Callas: Letters and Memoirs (out of competition)		Tom Volf, Yannis Dimolitsas	France; Italy; Greece
The Wild Robot (out of competition)		Chris Sanders	United States

=== Velodrome (Velódromo) ===
The following pictures will be screened at the Velodrome:

English title	Original title	Director(s)	Production countrie(s)
Celeste (TV series)		Elena Trapé	Spain

=== Retrospective: Violent Italy ===
The retrospective section 'Violent Italy', dedicated to Italian crime films, includes the following titles:

English title	Original title	Director(s)	Production countrie(s)
Obsession	Ossessione	Luchino Visconti	Italy
Escape to France	Fuga in Francia	Mario Soldati	Italy
In the Name of the Law	In nome della legge	Pietro Germi	Italy
The Crossroads	Il bivio	Fernando Cerchio	Italy
Four Ways Out	La città si difende	Pietro Germi	Italy
The City Stands Trial	Processo alla città	Luigi Zampa	Italy
The Facts of Murder	Un maledetto imbroglio	Pietro Germi	Italy
Mafioso		Alberto Lattuada	Italy
The Violent Four	Banditi a Milano	Carlo Lizzani	Italy
The Day of the Owl	Il giorno della civetta	Damiano Damiani	Italy; France
Inquiry of a Citizen Above Suspicion	Indagine su un cittadino al di sopra di ogni sospetto	Elio Petri	France; Italy
Caliber 9	Milano calibro 9	Fernando Di Leo	Italy
Execution Squad	La polizia ringrazia	Steno (Stefano Vanzina)	Italy; France
Revolver		Sergio Sollima	Italy; Germany
Almost Human	Milano odia: la polizia non può sparare	Umberto Lenzi	Italy
Illustrious Corpses	Cadaveri eccellenti	Francesco Rosi	Italy; France
The Tough Ones	Roma a mano armata	Umberto Lenzi	Italy
I Am the Law	Il prefetto di ferro	Pasquale Squitieri	Italy
The Moro Affair	Il caso Moro	Giuseppe Ferrara	Italy
Good Morning, Night	Buongiorno, notte	Marco Bellocchio	Italy
Gomorrah	Gomorra	Matteo Garrone	Italy
Last Night of Amore	L'ultima notte di Amore	Andrea Di Stefano	Italy

=== Klasikoak ===
The Klasikoak selection includes the following films:

English title	Original title	Director(s)	Production countrie(s)
Tasio (1984)		Montxo Armendáriz	Spain
Tattoo, the First Adventure of Pepe Carvalho (1978)	Tatuaje, primera aventura de Pepe Carvalho	Bigas Luna	Spain
The Woman of Wrath (1984)	Sha fu	Tseng Chuang-hsiang	Taiwan
Furrows (1951)	Surcos	José Antonio Nieves Conde	Spain
The Piano (1993)		Jane Campion	Australia
Un rêve plus long que la nuit (1976)		Niki de Saint Phalle	France

=== RTVE Galas ===
RTVE programmed galas for three film presentations:

English title	Original title	Director(s)	Production countrie(s)
May I Speak with the Enemy?	¿Es el enemigo? La película de Gila	Alexis Morante	Spain; Portugal
Escape		Rodrigo Cortés	Spain; France
The Girls at the Station	Las chicas de la estación	Juana Macías	Spain

=== Culinary Zinema ===
The films in the Culinary Zinema slate are listed as follows:

English title	Original title	Director(s)	Production countrie(s)
Mugaritz. Sin pan ni postre		Paco Plaza	Spain
The Platform 2 (closing, out of competition)	El hoyo 2	Galder Gaztelu-Urrutia	Spain
Grand Maison Paris		Ayuko Tsukahara	Japan; United Kingdom
Northern Food Story	Kita no syokukei	Tetsuya Uesugi	Japan
Shelf Life		Ian Cheney	United States

=== Made in Spain ===
The films in the Made in Spain slate are listed as follows:

English title	Original title	Director(s)	Production countrie(s)
Tiempo de silencio y destrucción		Joan López Lloret	Spain
Mucha mierda	Break a Leg	Alba Sotorra	Spain
As Neves		Sonia Méndez	Spain
A House on Fire	Casa en flames	Dani de la Orden	Spain; Italy
El hombre bueno		David Trueba	Spain
Concrete Flowers	Flores del cemento	Luismi Pantiga	Spain
Artificial Justice	Justicia artificial	Simón Casal	Spain; Portugal
Holy Mother	La abadesa	Antonio Chavarrías	Spain; Belgium
La casa		Álex Montoya	Spain
Little Loves	Los pequeños amores	Celia Rico Clavellino	Spain; France
Mamífera		Liliana Torres	Spain
Nina		Andrea Jaurrieta	Spain
Norberta		Sonia Escolano, Belén López Albert	Spain
Orgullo vieja		Chema Rodríguez	Spain
To Laugh, To Sing, Perhaps To Cry	Reír, cantar, tal vez llorar	Marc Ferrer	Spain
Rock Bottom		María Trénor	Spain; Poland
Saturno		Daniel Tornero	Spain
Saturn Return	Segundo premio	Isaki Lacuesta, Pol Rodríguez	Spain; France
Dreams and Crumbs	Sueños y pan	Luis (Soto) Muñoz	Spain
The Other Way Around	Volveréis	Jonás Trueba	Spain

== Awards ==
Some of the festival awards as listed as follows:

=== Main Competition ===
- Golden Shell: Afternoons of Solitude by Albert Serra
- Special Jury Prize: Cast of The Last Showgirl
- Silver Shell for Best Director: Laura Carreira for On Falling & Pedro Martín-Calero for The Wailing
- Silver Shell for Best Leading Performance: Patricia López Arnaiz for Glimmers
- Silver Shell for Best Supporting Performance: Pierre Lottin for When Fall Is Coming
- Jury Prize for Best Screenplay: François Ozon for When Fall Is Coming
- Jury Prize Best Cinematography: Piao Songri for Bound in Heaven

=== Other official awards ===
- Kutxabank-New Directors Award: Bagger Drama by Piet Baumgartner
  - Special Mention: La guitarra flamenca de Yerai Cortés by Antón Álvarez
- Horizontes Award: Kill the Jockey by Luis Ortega
- Zabaltegi-Tabakalera Award: April by Dea Kulumbegashvili
  - Special Mention: Collective Monologue by Jessica Sarah Rinland
- Nest Award: The Reign of Antoine by José Luis Jiménez Gómez
- Culinary Zinema Award: Mugaritz. Sin pan ni postre by Paco Plaza
- Eusko Label Award – First Award: Las Guardianas by Borja De Agüero
  - Eusko Label Award – Second Award: KM 0 by Jon Martija Leunda
- Irizar Basque Film Award: Chaplin, Spirit of the Tramp by Carmen Chaplin
  - Special Mention: Réplica by Pello Gutiérrez Peñalba
- San Sebastian Audience Award: The Marching Band by Emmanuel Courcol
- San Sebastian Audience Award for Best European Film: The Seed of the Sacred Fig by Mohammad Rasoulof
- Dama Youth Award: Turn Me On by Michael Tyburski

=== Industry awards ===
- WIP LATAM Industry Award: A Loose End by Daniel Hendler
- EGEDA PLATINO Industria Award for the Best WIP LATAM: Cuerpo Celeste by Nayra Ilic
- WIP Europa Industry Award: Blue Marks by Sarah Miro Fischer
- WIP Europa Award: Blue Marks by Sarah Miro Fischer
- XIII Europe-Latin America Co-Production Forum Best Project Award: The Two Landscapes by Francisco Lezama
- DALE! Award: The Two Landscapes by Francisco Lezama
- Artekino International Prize: Mar de Lebo by Mariana Saffon
- ELAMEDIA - Euskadi Post-Production Award:

=== Other awards ===
- RTVE-Another Look Award: All We Imagine as Light by Payal Kapadia
  - Special Mention: On Falling by Laura Carreira
- Spanish Cooperation Award: Sujo by Astrid Rondero, Fernanda Valadez
- Euskadi Basque Country 2030 Agenda Award: I'm Nevenka by Icíar Bollaín
- Dunia Ayaso Award: Little Loves by Celia Rico Clavellino

=== Parallel awards ===
- FIPRESCI Award: Bound in Heaven by Huo Xin
- Feroz Zinemaldia Award: Afternoons of Solitude by Albert Serra
- Sebastiane Award: Reas by Lola Arias
- Lurra - Greenpeace Award: The Wild Robot by Chris Sanders
- SIGNIS Award: Glimmers by Pilar Palomero
- Ateneo Guipuzcoano Award: Afternoons of Solitude by Albert Serra

=== Donostia Award ===
- Pedro Almodóvar
- Cate Blanchett
