= The Last Romantics =

- Theatrical release poster
- Basque: Azken erromantikoak
- Directed by: David Pérez Sañudo
- Screenplay by: David Pérez Sañudo; Marina Parés Pulido
- Based on: Los últimos románticos by Txani Rodríguez
- Produced by: Olmo Figueredo González-Quevedo; Ander Sargadoy; Carlos Rosado Sibón; Ander Barinaga-Rementeria; Xabier Berzosa; Manuel H. Martín
- Starring: Miren Gaztañaga; Maica Barroso; Erik Probanza
- Cinematography: Víctor Benavides Olazabal
- Edited by: Lluís Murua
- Music by: Beatriz López-Nogales
- Production companies: La Claqueta PC; Irusoin; Irune y Miguel Maria AIE; La Cruda Realidad; Miami Film Gate
- Distributed by: A Contracorriente Films (es)
- Release dates: 23 September 2024 (Zinemaldia); 15 November 2024 (Spain)
- Countries: Spain; United States
- Languages: Basque; Spanish

The Last Romantics (Basque: Azken erromantikoak) is a 2024 drama film directed by David Pérez Sañudo based on the novel Los últimos románticos by Txani Rodríguez starring Miren Gaztañaga.

== Plot ==
Set in an industrial town of Álava, the plot follows the plight of reclusive and hypochondriac paper factory worker Irune upon discovering a bulge in her chest while involving in trade union struggle.

== Cast ==
- Miren Gaztañaga as Irune
- Maica Barroso as Paulina
- Erik Probanza as Iker
- Ignacio Mateos as Miguel María
- Arkaitz Gartziandia as Aritz
- Iñigo Aranburu as Esteban
- Itziar Aizpuru as Ángeles
- Jon Zumelaga as Abel

== Production ==
The film was produced by La Claqueta PC and Irusoin alongside Irune y Miguel Maria AIE, La Cruda Realidad and Miami Film Gate with the participation of EiTB, Canal Sur, RTVE, and Max and backing from ICAA, Basque Government and Creative Europe MEDIA. Shooting locations included Gernika, Lisbon, Ronda, and Seville.

== Release ==
The Last Romantics had its world premiere in the 'New Directors' strand of the 72nd San Sebastián International Film Festival on 23 September 2024. It also made it to the 'New Andalusian Panorama' slate of the 21st Seville European Film Festival. Distributed by A Contracorriente Films, it was released theatrically in Spain on 15 November 2024.

== Reception ==
Alfonso Rivera of Cineuropa wrote that Pérez Sañudo adds an "extra dose of melancholy with dim, grey and intentionally ugly cinematography" [...] "and ends up imbuing the entire running time with sorrow, making it a hard watch".

Rubén Romero Santos of Cinemanía rated the film 4 out of 5 stars, declaring Pérez Sañudo as the best director of actresses of his generation, with a fabulous performance by Gaztañaga.

Javier Ocaña of El País wrote that the film "has a spirit of collective defeat, of time running out, of a society corrupted by a kind of moral debacle in which there is no room for good souls like that of its protagonist".

== Accolades ==
Year	Award	Category	Nominee(s)	Result	Ref.
2025	4th Carmen Awards	Best Adapted Screenplay	Marina Parés	Nominated	

== See also ==
- List of Spanish films of 2024
