= The Girls at the Station =

- Theatrical release poster
- Spanish: Las chicas de la estación
- Directed by: Juana Macías
- Screenplay by: Isa Sánchez; Juana Macías
- Starring: Julieta Tobío; Salua Hadra; María Steelman
- Cinematography: Guillermo Sempere
- Edited by: María Macías
- Music by: Isabel Royán
- Production companies: FeelGood Media; Kowalski Films; La Perifèrica Produccions; Las chicas de la estación AIE
- Distributed by: A Contracorriente Films
- Release dates: 23 September 2024 (Zinemaldia); 22 November 2024 (Spain)
- Country: Spain
- Language: Spanish

The Girls at the Station (Spanish: Las chicas de la estación) is a 2024 Spanish drama film directed by Juana Macías from a screenplay by Macías and Isa Sánchez. It stars Julieta Tobío, Salua Hadra, and María Steelman.

== Plot ==
The plot follows the plight of Jara, Álex, and Miranda, three teenage girls who have been raised together in a centre for minors under guardianship and become entangled in a prostitution ring.

== Cast ==
- Julieta Tobío as Jara
- Salua Hadra as Álex
- María Steelman as Miranda
- Xoán Fórneas
- Pepo Llopis as Marcos
- Arantxa Aranguren
- Saida Santana
- Antonio Navarro
- Sara Miquel
- Manuela Paso as Montse

== Production ==
The plot is based on a real case that shocked public opinion involving multiple instances of sexual abuse of residents in public centers managed by the Mallorca Council. The Girls at the Station was produced by FeelGood Media, Kowalski Films, La Perifèrica Produccions and Las chicas de la estación AIE, with the participation of RTVE, IB3 and Movistar Plus+ and the backing from ICAA, Mallorca Turisme, Mallorca Film Commission, the Madrid regional administration and Ayuntamiento de Madrid. Principal photography started on 5 June 2023. Shooting locations included Palma de Mallorca and Madrid.

== Release ==
The film was presented at the Cines Príncipe during a RTVE gala of the 72nd San Sebastián International Film Festival on 23 September 2024. It is scheduled to be released theatrically in Spain on 22 November 2024 by A Contracorriente Films.

== Reception ==
Alfonso Rivera of Cineuropa wrote that the film not just emerges as "a respectable and effective condemnation film, but also as a love letter to friendship and sisterhood".

Javier Ocaña of El País wrote that Macías finds some of the best scenes in the film in the "contrast between the outer light of the girls, for they are girls, and the inner darkness".

Juan Pando of Fotogramas rated the film 3 out 5 stars, pointing out that Macías' greatest success "lies in the cast, made up of non-professional debutants, who lend nerve and authenticity to the drama", while mentioning that the ending "errs on the side of optimism".

== Accolades ==
| Year | Award | Category | Nominee(s) | Result | Ref. |
|---|---|---|---|---|---|
| 2025 | 4th Carmen Awards | Best New Actress | María Steelman | Nominated | |
| 2025 | 4th Carmen Awards | Best Original Score | Isabel Royán | Nominated | |

== See also ==
- List of Spanish films of 2024
