= Norberta (film) =

- Theatrical release poster
- Directed by: Sonia Escolano; Belén López Albert
- Screenplay by: Sonia Escolano
- Produced by: Eva Taboada
- Starring: Luis Bermejo; Adriana Ozores; Mariona Terés; María Romanillos
- Cinematography: David Valldepérez
- Edited by: Liana Artigal
- Music by: Arnau Bataller
- Production companies: Imposible Films; Norbertafilm AIE
- Distributed by: Filmax
- Release date: 25 July 2024
- Country: Spain
- Language: Spanish

Norberta is a 2024 Spanish comedy film directed by Sonia Escolano and Belén López Albert, which stars Luis Bermejo as the title character and Adriana Ozores alongside Mariona Terés and María Romanillos.

== Plot ==
Norberto and María live together a humble existence in a working-class neighborhood as a couple close to their retirement, while pulling occasional robberies. They are parents to Natalia and grandparents to gender-fluid Paula. Norberto confesses to María about having always being a woman trapped in a man's body.

== Cast ==
- Luis Bermejo as Norberto
- Adriana Ozores as María
- Mariona Terés as Natalia
- María Romanillos as Paula
- Adelfa Calvo as Pepa
- Carme Balagué as Tere
- María Lanau as Rosa
- Ramon Agirre as Manolo
- Xavier Deltell as Paco
- César Tormo as Tomás
- Ángeles Ortega as Samantha
- Teresa Lozano as Magdalena

== Production ==
The film was produced by Imposible Films and Norbertafilm AIE, with the participation of RTVE, TVC, and Movistar Plus+ and backing from ICAA. It was shot in El Carmel neighborhood of Barcelona.

== Release ==
Distributed by Filmax, Norberta was released theatrically in Spain on 25 July 2024.

== Reception ==
Javier Ocaña of El País deemed Norberta to be a decent comedy-drama film, writing that despite some screenplay shortcomings, Bermejo's singular humorousness and Ozores' sensitivity manage to "elevate a whole with no greater pretensions than to be on the side of their characters".

Juan Pando of Fotogramas rated the film 3 out of 5 stars, considering it to be a comedy-drama defined by the exceptional work delivered by its protagonist, a "colossal" Luis Bermejo.

Raquel Hernández Luján of HobbyConsolas gave the film 67 points ('acceptable') citing the "performances and the naturalness of the characters: it is a very white and pleasant comedy" as the film's hallmark while citing the feeling "of being very anecdotal [film]", possibly working better as a short film, as its worst feature.

Manuel J. Lombardo of Diario de Sevilla gave Norberta 2 stars, writing that while the protagonist's transition process is portrayed "in a friendly and positive manner", the insistent attempts at comedy, subtracting from the story's dramatic weight, seem phony.

Luis Martínez of El Mundo rated the film 3 out of 5 stars, writing about the "masterful" performances by Bermejo and Ozores, while acknowledging that the film is dragged down by its "pedagogical, if not chastening" intentions.

Fernardo Bernal of Cinemanía rated the film 3 out of 5 stars, deeming it to be a "human and character comedy", largely sustained by the acting work.

== See also ==
- List of Spanish films of 2024
