= Honeymoon (disambiguation) =

A honeymoon is the traditional holiday taken by newlyweds.

Honeymoon, The Honeymoon, or Honey Moon may also refer to:

== Places ==
- Honeymoon Bridge (disambiguation), several bridges
- Honeymoon Island State Park, a Florida State Park located on Honeymoon Island

== Arts, entertainment, and media ==
=== Films ===
- Honeymoon (1928 American film), a comedy film directed by Robert A. Golden
- Honeymoon (1928 German film), a silent film directed by E.W. Emo
- Honeymoon (1935 film), a French comedy film
- Honeymoon (1941 film), an Italian film
- Honeymoon (1947 film), an American comedy film directed by William Keighley
- Honeymoon (1956 film), a Soviet comedy film
- Honeymoon (1959 film), a British / Spanish film directed by Michael Powell
- Honeymoon (1972 film) (Swedish: Smekmånad), a Swedish drama film directed by Claes Lundberg
- Honeymoon (1973 film), a Hindi comedy film directed by Hiren Nag
- Honeymoon (1974 film), an Indian Malayalam film
- Honeymoon (1985 film), a Franco-Canadian film by Patrick Jamain
- Honeymoon (1992 film), a Bollywood film
- Honeymoons (film), a 2009 Serbian-Albanian drama film
- Honeymoon (2013 film) (Czech: Líbánky), a Czech film directed by Jan Hřebejk
- Honeymoon (2014 film), an American horror film directed by Leigh Janiak
- Honeymoon (2018 film), an Indian Bengali comedy drama film directed by Premendu Bikash Chaki
- Honeymoon (2022 film), an Indian Punjabi-language comedy-drama film
- Honeymoon (2023 film), a Spanish film

=== Literature ===
- "Honeymoon", a 1905 poem by Noël Coward
- Honeymoon, a 2000 novel by Amy Jenkins
- Honeymoon, a 1995 novel by Patrick Modiano
- Honeymoon, a novel by James Patterson & Howard Roughan
- The Honey Moon, an 1805 play by John Tobin
- The Honeymoon, a 1987 novel by Knut Faldbakken
- The Honeymoon, a 2004 novel by Justin Haythe
- The Honeymoon, a 1986 novel by Violet Winspear

=== Music ===
==== Albums ====
- Honey Moon (The Handsome Family album), 2009
- Honeymoon (Lana Del Rey album), 2015 (or its title song, see below)
- Honeymoon (Beach Bunny album), 2020
- Honeymoon, a 1999 album by Rondò Veneziano

==== Songs ====
- "Honeymoon" (Lana Del Rey song), a 2015 song by Lana Del Rey
- "Honeymoon" (Joe Howard song), a 1929 song by Joseph E. Howard
- "Honeymoon", a song by Clinton Ford
- "Honeymoon", a song by Don Toliver from the 2023 album Love Sick
- "Honeymoon", a song by Marino Marini
- "Honeymoon", a song by Tomahawk from the 2001 album Tomahawk
- "Honeymoon", a song by twlv

=== Television ===
- Mah-e Asal (Persian: ماه عسل), Iranian TV series meaning "Honeymoon"
- The Honeymooners, American television series
- Honeymoon (Indian TV series), Indian Kannada-language series

==== Episodes ====
- "Honeymoon" (Barbara), 2003
- "Honeymoon" (Brooklyn Nine-Nine), 2019
- "The Honeymoon" (Agents of S.H.I.E.L.D.), 2018
- "The Honeymoon" (Dynasty), 1981
- "The Honeymoon" (Mork & Mindy), 1981

== Other uses ==
- Honeymoon (horse), an American Thoroughbred racehorse
  - Honeymoon Handicap, an American Grade II Thoroughbred horse race
- Honeymoon suite (hotel), a type of suite at hotels and cruises

== See also ==
- Honey (disambiguation)
- Moon (disambiguation)
