= The Sleeping Woman =

- Film poster
- Spanish: La mujer dormida
- Directed by: Laura Alvea
- Screenplay by: Miguel Ibáñez Monroy; Daniel González; Marta Armengol
- Produced by: Olmo Figueredo González-Quevedo; Marta Ramírez
- Starring: Almudena Amor; Javier Rey; Amanda Goldsmith
- Cinematography: Fran Fernández-Pardo
- Edited by: José M. G. Moyano; Fátima de los Santos
- Music by: Alfred Tapscott
- Production companies: La Claqueta PC; Coming Soon Films
- Distributed by: Filmax
- Release dates: 9 February 2024 (IAFFM); 31 May 2024 (Spain)
- Running time: 108 minutes
- Countries: Spain; United States
- Language: Spanish

The Sleeping Woman (Spanish: La mujer dormida) is a 2024 psychological thriller film directed by Laura Alvea which stars Almudena Amor and Javier Rey alongside Amanda Goldsmith.

== Plot ==
The plot concerns about a love triangle, following Ana, an auxiliary nurse developing a romantic attraction towards Agustín (the husband of the patient in a vegetative state she is in charge of taking care). Ana is disturbed by supernatural developments around her.

== Cast ==
- Almudena Amor as Ana
- Javier Rey as Agustín
- Amanda Goldsmith as Sara
- Alicia Lobo as Marta
- Yanely Hernández as Manuela
- Pino Montesdeoca as Sofía
- Guacimara Correa as farmacéutica

== Production ==
The film was produced by La Claqueta PC and Coming Soon Films with the participation of RTVE and TVE3 and support from ICAA and Junta de Andalucía. Shooting locations included the island of Gran Canaria and Seville.

== Release ==
The film was selected as the closing film of the 6th Ibero-American Film Festival Miami for a 9 February 2024 premiere. It also made it to the non-competitive slate of the 27th Málaga Film Festival's official selection. Distributed by Filmax, it was set to be released theatrically in Spain on 31 May 2024. Lighthouse Home Entertainment acquired German rights to the film. The film also sold to India and subcontinent (BookMyShow), Taiwan (Cai Chang International), South Korea (Behind the Scene Company) and Indonesia (Sun Pictures).

== Reception ==
Raquel Hernández Luján of HobbyConsolas gave the film 65 points ('acceptable'), positively mentioning "the central idea and the slight touches of horror", as well the existence of "Hitchcockian echoes" resonating in the background, while negatively mentioning the film's "cumbersome development", [over-]accumulating revelations by the end of the film.

Rubén Romero Santos of Cinemanía rated the film 3 out of 5 stars, billing it as a "luminous revision of Hitchcock's legacy" in the verdict.

Desirée de Fez of El Periódico de Catalunya rated the film 2 out of 5 stars, writing that it "does not take off in any direction".

== Accolades ==
Year	Award	Category	Nominee(s)	Result	Ref.
2025	4th Carmen Awards	Best Director	Laura Alvea	Nominated	
2025	4th Carmen Awards	Best Editing	Fátima de los Santos, José M. G. Moyano	Nominated	
2025	4th Carmen Awards	Best Cinematography	Fran Fernández	Nominated	
2025	4th Carmen Awards	Best Sound	Antuán Mejías, Abraham F. Apresa, Poli Laclaustra	Nominated	
2025	4th Carmen Awards	Best Special Effects	Amparo Martínez Barco	Nominated	

== See also ==
- List of Spanish films of 2024
