= The Party's Over (2024 film) =

- Theatrical release poster
- Spanish: Fin de fiesta
- Directed by: Elena Manrique
- Screenplay by: Elena Manrique
- Produced by: Carlos Rosado Sibón; Hans Everaert; Belén Atienza Azcona; Olmo Figueredo González-Quevedo; Sandra Hermida Muñiz
- Starring: Edith Martínez-Val; Beatriz Arjona; Sonia Barba
- Cinematography: Joachim Philippe
- Edited by: Laurent Dufreche
- Music by: Argia
- Production companies: La Claqueta PC; Perdición Films; La Cruda Realidad; Think Studio; Story Capital AIE; Menuetto Films
- Distributed by: A Contracorriente Films
- Release dates: September 2024 (TIFF); 31 January 2025 (Spain)
- Countries: Spain; Belgium
- Languages: Spanish; French

The Party's Over (Spanish: Fin de fiesta) is a 2024 black comedy film written and directed by Elena Manrique (in her directorial debut feature). It stars Edith Martínez-Val, Beatriz Arjona, and Sonia Barba.

== Plot ==
The plot deals with the events unravelling upon the arrival of African migrant Bilal to an Andalusian manor house (inhabited by party-loving Carmina and her maid Lupe) on the road to Marseille.

== Cast ==
- Edith Martínez-Val as Bilal / Binta
- Beatriz Arjona as Lupe
- Sonia Barba as Carmina
- José Manuel Seda as Luis
- Paco Mora as Paco
- Roma Calderón as Tessa
- Pedro Romero as Cayetano
- Luichi Macías as Dolores

== Production ==
The project was originally known as in Spanish as Se acabó la fiesta, but the title was swiftly changed upon the creation of the far-right political party of the same name. The film is a Spanish-Belgian co-production by La Claqueta PC and Perdición Films alongside La Cruda Realidad, Think Studio, Story Capital AIE and Menuetto Films, with the participation of TVE, Movistar Plus+, and Canal Sur, and backing from ICAA, AAIICC, Creative Europe MEDIA, and Eurimages. Belén Atienza Azcona, Olmo Figueredo González-Quevedo, and Sandra Hermida Muñiz took over production duties, with Sara Gómez and Inés Mas executively producing. The film was shot in Chucena.

== Release ==
The film world premiered in the 'Discovery' programme lineup of the 2024 Toronto International Film Festival (TIFF). It had its Spanish premiere at the 69th Valladolid International Film Festival (Seminci) in October 2024. Its festival run also included selections at the Seville European Film Festival (SEFF) and the Almería International Film Festival (FICAL). It is scheduled to be released theatrically in Spain on 31 January 2025.

== Reception ==
Alfonso Rivera of Cineuropa wrote that the film "stands as a fresh-feeling film with a mischievousness that is more than welcome in modern cinema".

Philipp Engel of Cinemanía rated the film 4 out of 5 stars, deeming it to be "fresh, pinpoint and hilarious".

== Accolades ==
Year	Award	Category	Nominee(s)	Result	Ref.
2025	4th Carmen Awards	Best Actress	Beatriz Arjona	Won	
2025	4th Carmen Awards	Best Makeup and Hairstyles	Yolanda Piña, Félix Terrero	Nominated	
2025	4th Carmen Awards	Best Production Supervision	Manolo Limón	Nominated	

== See also ==
- List of Spanish films of 2025
