= Rita (2024 Spanish film) =

- Theatrical release poster
- Directed by: Paz Vega
- Written by: Paz Vega
- Produced by: Marta Velasco; Gonzalo Bendala
- Starring: Sofía Allepuz; Alejandro Escamilla; Paz Vega; Roberto Álamo
- Cinematography: Eva Díaz Iglesias
- Edited by: Ana Álvarez-Ossorio
- Music by: Pablo Cervantes
- Production companies: Áralan Films; Rita la Película AIE
- Distributed by: Filmax
- Release dates: 16 August 2024 (Locarno); 25 October 2024 (Spain)
- Country: Spain
- Language: Spanish

Rita is a 2024 Spanish drama film written and directed by Paz Vega (in her directorial debut feature) which stars Sofía Allepuz as the title character alongside Alejandro Escamilla, Paz Vega, and Roberto Álamo.

== Plot ==
Set in 1984 Seville against the backdrop of the craze about the UEFA Euro 1984, and with the Spanish team making inroads in the knockout stage, the plot follows siblings Rita and Lolo (respectively 7- and 5-year-old), as the former dreams about going to the beach.

== Cast ==
- Sofía Allepuz as Rita
- Alejandro Escamilla as Lolo
- Paz Vega as Mari
- Roberto Álamo as José Manuel
- Daniel Navarro as Nito
- Paz de Alarcón as Chari
- Amada Santos as Tita Merche
- Margarita Asquerino as abuela Carmen

== Production ==
The film was produced by Áralan Films and Rita la Película AIE, with the association of Oda Films and Arte Sonora Estudios, the participation of Canal Sur, RTVE, and Movistar Plus+, and the funding from ICAA, AAIICC, Triodos Bank, and Crea SGR, boasting a budget of around €2 million. It was fully shot in Andalusia, with Seville as the prime shooting location.

== Release ==
Rita had its world premiere at the Piazza Grande during the 77th Locarno Film Festival on 16 August 2024. It also made it to the official selection slate of the 69th Valladolid International Film Festival (for its Spanish premiere), to the New Directors Competition slate of the 60th Chicago International Film Festival (for its North-American premiere), and to the International Competition of the 39th Mar del Plata International Film Festival (for its Argentine premiere). Distributed by Filmax, it was released theatrically in Spain on 25 October 2024.

Signature Entertainment acquired United Kingdom and Ireland rights to the film.

== Reception ==
Marko Stojiljković of Cineuropa wrote that Vega "demonstrates a knack for storytelling, both as a writer and as a director. Her script is cleverly written and masterfully controlled by her directing, with a good sense of visual narration".

Jonathan Holland of ScreenDaily deemed Rita to be a "subtle and potent" directorial debut.

Enid Román Almansa of Cinemanía rated the film 4 out of 5 stars, declaring it not only a love letter to the past, but also a return to innocence.

Juan Pando of Fotogramas rated the film 3 out of 5 stars, considering it a "promising" directorial debut.

Marta Medina of El Confidencial rated the film 4 out of 5 stars, writing that Vega "has shown that she has the gaze, the taste and the pulse to pull off not just a film, but a good film".

== Accolades ==
Year	Award	Category	Nominee(s)	Result	Ref.
2025	4th Carmen Awards	Best Film		Nominated	
2025	4th Carmen Awards	Best New Director	Paz Vega	Won	
2025	4th Carmen Awards	Best Original Screenplay	Paz Vega	Nominated	
2025	4th Carmen Awards	Best Supporting Actress	Amada Santos	Nominated	
2025	4th Carmen Awards	Best Supporting Actress	Paz Vega	Nominated	
2025	4th Carmen Awards	Best New Actress	Paz de Alarcón	Won	
2025	4th Carmen Awards	Best Editing	Ana Álvarez-Ossorio	Nominated	
2025	4th Carmen Awards	Best Original Score	Pablo Cervantes	Won	
2025	4th Carmen Awards	Best Art Direction	Amanda Román	Nominated	
2025	4th Carmen Awards	Best Production Supervision	Amanda Román	Won	
2025	4th Carmen Awards	Best Costume Design	Fernando García	Nominated	
2025	4th Carmen Awards	Best Sound	Daniel de Zayas, Jorge Marín	Won	
2025	4th Carmen Awards	Best Makeup and Hairstyles	Rafael Mora, Ángela Moreno	Nominated	
2025	4th Carmen Awards	Best Special Effects	Luis Melga	Nominated	
2025	39th Goya Awards	Best New Director	Paz Vega	Nominated	

== See also ==
- List of Spanish films of 2024
