= Mean Streak (film) =

- Theatrical release poster
- Spanish: Mala persona
- Directed by: Fer García-Ruiz
- Screenplay by: Antonio Mercero; Daniel Padró
- Based on: an original story by Diego San José
- Produced by: Marina Padró; Mar Targarona; Joaquín Padró; Christian Burnel
- Starring: Arturo Valls; Malena Alterio; Julián Villagrán; José Corbacho
- Cinematography: Rafa García
- Edited by: Elodie Leuthold
- Music by: Filipe Melo
- Production companies: Rodar y Rodar; Boavista Filmes; Mala Persona AIE
- Distributed by: Filmax (es)
- Release dates: 22 April 2024 (BCN Film Fest); 3 July 2024 (Spain)
- Countries: Spain; Portugal
- Language: Spanish

Mean Streak (Spanish: Mala persona) is a 2024 Spanish-Portuguese comedy film directed by Fer García-Ruiz from a screenplay by Antonio Mercero and Daniel Padró based on an original story by Diego San José. It stars Arturo Valls alongside Malena Alterio, Julián Villagrán, and José Corbacho.

== Plot ==
After being diagnosed with a terminal illness, Pepe, a man as good as gold, decides to become a bad person so nobody misses him when he is gone.

== Cast ==
- Arturo Valls as Pepe
- Malena Alterio as Sagrario
- Julián Villagrán as Juanjo
- José Corbacho as padre Héctor ('father Héctor')
- Teresa Lozano as suegra ('mother-in-law')
- Sara Jiménez as Candela
- Diva O'Branco as Ramona
- Víctor Benjumea as Tomás
- Daniel Arias as Mario
- Dafnis Balduz as conductor/banquero ('driver/banker')
- Betsy Túrnez as doctora ('doctor')

== Production ==
The film is a Spanish-Portuguese co-production by Rodar y Rodar, Boavista Filmes and Mala Persona AIE with the participation of RTVE, 3Cat, Triodos Bank, and Crea SGR, funding from ICAA, the collaboration of Amazon Prime, and the association of FilmFactory. It was shot on location in Bellvitge and Cornellà.

== Release ==
The film was presented at the BCN Film Fest on 22 April 2024. It also made it to the slate of the Alicante Film Festival. Distributed by Filmax, it was scheduled to be released theatrically in Spain on 3 July 2024.

== Reception ==
Mariona Borrull of Fotogramas rated the film 3 out of 5 stars, deeming it a 'family-friendly' and foul-mouthed esperpento, although with no offence intended.

Enid Román Almanza of Cinemanía rated the film 3 out of 5 stars, declaring it "a film for people without children but, above all, for those who like Spanish comedies".

== See also ==
- List of Spanish films of 2024
