= Birds Flying East =

- Theatrical release poster
- Spanish: Pájaros
- Directed by: Pau Durá
- Screenplay by: Pau Durá; Ana M. Peiró
- Produced by: David Ciurana; José Nolla; Cristina Zumárraga; Pablo E. Bossi; Rodrigo Ruiz Tarazona
- Starring: Luis Zahera; Javier Gutiérrez; Teresa Saponangelo; Diana Cavaliotti; Florin Kevorkian
- Cinematography: David Omedes
- Edited by: Lucas Nolla
- Music by: Magalí Datzira
- Production companies: Fosca Films; Icónica Producciones; Tandem Films; Birds Film AIE; Motion Pictures Management
- Distributed by: Filmax
- Release dates: 2 March 2024 (Málaga); 5 April 2024 (Spain)
- Countries: Spain; Romania
- Languages: Spanish; Italian; Romanian

Birds Flying East (Spanish: Pájaros) is a 2024 Spanish-Romanian road comedy-drama film directed by Pau Durà and starring Luis Zahera, Javier Gutiérrez, and Teresa Saponangelo.

== Plot ==
Stuttering lawyer and birdwatcher Mario obtains support from upbeat garage worker and weed dealer Colombo to travel east from Valencia to Constanța to follow migratory birds.

== Cast ==
- Luis Zahera as Mario
- Javier Gutiérrez as Colombo
- Teresa Saponangelo as Elisabetta
- Diana Cavaliotti

== Production ==
The film was produced by Fosca Films, Icónica Producciones, and Tandem Films alongside Birds Film AIE and Motion Pictures Management, with the participation of RTVE, Amazon Prime Video, and 3CAT. It was shot in between Spain, Italy, and Romania. It was shot in eight languages, including Spanish, Italian, Yiddish, Romanian, Arabic, and Hungarian.

== Release ==
Birds Flying East was presented at the 27th Málaga Film Festival on 2 March 2024. It is scheduled to be released theatrically in Spain on 5 April 2024 by Filmax.

== Reception ==
On the review aggregator website Rotten Tomatoes, 100% of 5 critics' reviews are positive, with an average rating of 7.3/10.

Jonathan Holland of ScreenDaily underscored the film to be "an engaging and energetic tragi-comic take on the multiple insecurities of masculinity in middle age".

Javier Ocaña of El País deemed the film to be "a worthy story of friendship among peers" and, drawing a comparison to 1960s and 1970s Italian cinema, wrote that "Gutiérrez and Zahera could perfectly be Vittorio Gassman and Alberto Sordi in search of themselves".

== Accolades ==
Year	Award	Category	Nominee(s)	Result	Ref.
2024	27th Málaga Film Festival	Silver Biznaga for Best Actor	Luis Zahera	Won	

== See also ==
- List of Spanish films of 2024
