= Family Affairs (film) =

- Theatrical release poster
- Spanish: Verano en diciembre
- Directed by: Carolina África
- Written by: Carolina África
- Based on: Verano en diciembre (play) by Carolina África
- Produced by: Maribel Muñoz; Andrés Martín; Antonio Gómez-Olea
- Starring: Carmen Machi; Bárbara Lennie; Victoria Luengo; Beatriz Grimaldos; Lola Cordón; Irene Escolar; Nacho Fresneda; Silvia Marsó; Antonio Resines
- Cinematography: Kiko de la Rica
- Edited by: Marino García
- Music by: Sergio de la Puente
- Production companies: Verano en diciembre AIE; Mare Films; Vértigo Films
- Distributed by: Vértigo Films
- Release dates: 19 October 2024 (Seminci); 8 November 2024 (Spain)
- Country: Spain
- Language: Spanish

Family Affairs (Spanish: Verano en diciembre, lit. 'Summer in December') is a 2024 Spanish comedy-drama film written and directed by Carolina África in her directorial debut. It is based on her own stage play. It stars Lola Cordón, Carmen Machi, Bárbara Lennie, Beatriz Grimaldos, and Victoria Luengo.

== Plot ==
Conflict is triggered upon the yearly commemoration of a decease, with the ensuing meeting of Teresa, her daughters, and her mother-in-law, who is under Teresa's care.

== Cast ==
- Lola Cordón as la abuela Martina
- Carmen Machi as Teresa
- Bárbara Lennie as Carmen
- Beatriz Grimaldos as Alicia
- Victoria Luengo as Paloma
- Irene Escolar as Noelia
- Antonio Resines as Don Ramón
- Silvia Marsó
- Nacho Fresneda as Rodrigo
- Santi Marín as Marcos

== Production ==
A Mare Films and Vértigo Films production, the film had the backing from RTVE, Movistar Plus+, and ICAA. Filming began on 30 October 2023, with Kiko de la Rica taking over cinematography duties, using an Alexa Mini and Zeiss Ultra Prime lenses. It had a budget of €2.3 million. While shooting, a tranche of €1.1 million in terms of production support for the film was approved by the ICAA.

== Release ==
The film had its world premiere in a RTVE gala at Teatro Calderón on 19 October 2024, as a part of the slate of the 69th Valladolid International Film Festival (Seminci), in a non-competitive official selection slot. Distributed by Vértigo Films, the film was scheduled to be released theatrically in Spain on 15 November 2024. Its release was eventually set to 8 November 2024.

== Reception ==
Juan Pando of Fotogramas rated the film 3 out of 5 stars, highlighting Cordón, a true scene-stealer, as the best thing about the film, while lamenting the jarring use of scatological humour.

== Accolades ==
Year	Award	Category	Nominee(s)	Result	Ref.
2025	4th Carmen Awards	Best Original Song	"Traviesa" by Sergio de la Puente	Nominated	
2025	39th Goya Awards	Best Original Score	Sergio de la Puente	Nominated	

== See also ==
- List of Spanish films of 2024
