= Cuerpo escombro =

- Theatrical release poster
- Directed by: Curro Velázquez
- Screenplay by: Curro Velázquez
- Produced by: Juan Gordon
- Starring: Dani Rovira; Cassandra Ciangherotti; Ernesto Sevilla; Omar Chaparro; María Hervás; Juan Manuel Montilla "Langui"; Antonio Resines; Marta Fernández Muro; Tito Valverde; Leo Harlem
- Cinematography: Néstor Calvo Pichardo
- Music by: Vanessa Garde
- Production company: Morena Films
- Distributed by: Buena Vista International
- Release dates: 11 July 2024 (Badajoz); 9 August 2024 (Spain)
- Country: Spain
- Language: Spanish

Cuerpo escombro is a 2024 Spanish comedy film directed by Curro Velázquez. It stars Dani Rovira alongside Cassandra Ciangherotti, Ernesto Sevilla, El Langui and María Hervás.

== Plot ==
Advised by brother Fermín, robotic engineer at a low ebb Javi impersonates a disabled person with cerebral palsy to get a job, falling for his new boss.

== Cast ==
- Dani Rovira as Javi
- Ernesto Sevilla as Fermín
- Cassandra Ciangherotti
- El Langui as Paco
- María Hervás
- Antonio Resines
- Leo Harlem
- Marta Fernández Muro
- Omar Chaparro
- Tito Valverde

== Production ==
Cuerpo escombro is a Morena Films production and it had the participation of RTVE, and Prime Video, backing from ICAA, and the endorsement of the Spanish Committee of Representatives of People with Disabilities (CERMI). It was shot in Bilbao.

== Release ==
The film had its world premiere at the Teatro López de Ayala during the 30th Badajoz Iberian Film Festival in July 2024. It is scheduled to be released theatrically in Spain on 9 August 2024 by Buena Vista International.

== Reception ==
Enid Román Almansa of Cinemanía rated the film 3 out of 5 stars, writing that "funny and with tender moments, it achieves what it sets out to do".

Raquel Hernández Luján of HobbyConsolas gave Cuerpo escombro 45 points ('bad') considering that it would have done the film a lot of good to embrace black comedy rather than diving into a romantic comedy full of platitudes and genre clichés.

Pablo Vázquez of Fotogramas rated the film 3 out of 5 stars, citing the Rovira/Sevilla duo and the "queen" Hervás as the best thing about the film, while mentioning the "dumb" work-related subplot as the film's worst.

== See also ==
- List of Spanish films of 2024
