= May I Speak with the Enemy? =

- Theatrical release poster
- Spanish: ¿Es el enemigo? La película de Gila
- Directed by: Alexis Morante
- Screenplay by: Alexis Morante; Raúl Santos
- Story by: Alexis Morante; José Alba
- Based on: El libro de Gila. Antología cómica de obra y vida by Miguel Gila
- Produced by: José Alba; Sandra Tapia; Ibon Cormenzana; Ignasi Estapé; Ángel Durández
- Starring: Óscar Lasarte; Carlos Cuevas; Natalia de Molina; Salva Reina; Iván Villanueva; Antonio Bachiller; David Elvira
- Cinematography: Carlos García de Dios
- Edited by: José M. G. Moyano
- Music by: Miguel Santos
- Production companies: Pecado Films; Arcadia Motion Pictures; Philmo Capital AIE; Nu Boyana Portugal
- Distributed by: Filmax
- Release dates: 26 September 2024 (Zinemaldia); 13 December 2024 (Spain)
- Countries: Spain; Portugal
- Language: Spanish

May I Speak With the Enemy? (Spanish: ¿Es el enemigo? La película de Gila) is a 2024 tragicomedy film directed by Alexis Morante starring Óscar Lasarte as comedian Miguel Gila.

== Plot ==
The plot explores the beginnings of comedian Miguel Gila, when the life of a young Miguel in 1936 Madrid is upended by the outbreak of the Spanish Civil War, managing to survive misfortunes, the trenches, the firing squad and prison.

== Cast ==
- Óscar Lasarte as Miguel Gila
- Carlos Cuevas as Pedro
- Salva Reina as Cabo
- Iván Villanueva as maestro
- Antonio Bachiller as Ginés
- Natalia de Molina as Rosa
- David Elvira as Pantxo
- Adelfa Calvo as abuela
- Ramón Ibarra as abuelo
- Vicente Romero as teniente Villegas
- Guiomar Puerta as Patricia
- Nagore Andrés as Maruja
- Iñigo Aranburu as Antonio
- Paulo Pires as general
- Pedro Casablanc as coronel Salgado

== Production ==
Inspired by the book El libro de Gila. Antología cómica de obra y vida and based on a story by Alexis Morante and José Alba, the screenplay was written by Morante and Raúl Santos. The film was produced by Pecado Films, Arcadia Motion Pictures and Philmo Capital AIE alongside Nu Boyana Portugal and it had the participation of RTVE, Movistar Plus+, Canal Sur, 3Cat, funding from ICAA and the involvement of CreaSGR. Shooting locations in Biscay included Durango, that stood in for Madrid, and the forest of Otzarreta.

== Release ==
The film was at the 72nd San Sebastián International Film Festival on 26 September 2024. It is scheduled to be released theatrically in Spain on 13 December 2024 by Filmax.

== Reception ==
Fausto Fernández of Fotogramas rated the film 3 out of 5 stars, highlighting the appearances of Romero and Calvo as the best thing about the film.

Toni Vall of Cinemanía rated the film 4 out of 5 stars, declaring it "a beautiful film, a deep tribute to the master Gila".

== Accolades ==
Year	Award	Category	Nominee(s)	Result	Ref.
2025	4th Carmen Awards	Best Film		Nominated	
2025	4th Carmen Awards	Best Director	Alexis Morante	Won	
2025	4th Carmen Awards	Best Adapted Screenplay	Alexis Morante, Raúl Santos	Won	
2025	4th Carmen Awards	Best Supporting Actor	Salva Reina	Nominated	
2025	4th Carmen Awards	Best Supporting Actor	Vicente Romero	Nominated	
2025	4th Carmen Awards	Best Supporting Actress	Adelfa Calvo	Won	
2025	4th Carmen Awards	Best Editing	José M.G. Moyano	Nominated	
2025	4th Carmen Awards	Best Art Direction	Beatriz López Herrerías	Nominated	
2025	39th Goya Awards	Best New Actor	Óscar Lasarte	Nominated	
2025	33rd Actors and Actresses Union Awards	Best New Actor	Óscar Lasarte	Nominated	

== See also ==
- List of Spanish films of 2024
