= Alone in the Night =

Alone in the Night may refer to:

- Alone in the Night (1945 film), a French crime film
- Alone in the Night (1994 film), a Japanese film by Takashi Ishii
- Alone in the Night (2024 film), a Spanish comedy-drama film
- Alone in the Night, a song by Roger Daltrey, from the album Can't Wait to See the Movie
