= Jumping the Fence =

- Theatrical release poster
- Spanish: El salto
- Directed by: Benito Zambrano
- Written by: Flora González Villanueva
- Produced by: Jesús Ulled Nadal; Carlos Fernández; Laura Fernández Brites; Jérôme Vidal
- Starring: Moussa Sylla; Edith Martínez-Val; Eric Nantchouang; Nansi Nsue; Vicky Peña; Mariola Fuentes; Vicenta Ndongo
- Cinematography: Alex de Pablo
- Edited by: Teresa Font
- Music by: Pascal Gaigne
- Production companies: Cine 365 Films Canarias AIE; Cine365 Films PC; Virtual Contenidos; Castelao Pictures; Noodles Productions
- Distributed by: Filmax
- Release dates: 3 March 2024 (Málaga); 12 April 2024 (Spain)
- Countries: Spain; France
- Languages: Spanish; French

Jumping the Fence (Spanish: El salto) is a 2024 Spanish-French drama film directed by Benito Zambrano and written by Flora González Villanueva which stars Moussa Sylla, Edith Martínez-Val, Eric Nantchouang, and Nansi Nsue.

== Plot ==
Ibrahim, an African irregular immigrant earning a living as a bricklayer in Madrid, is deported back to his native country. He attempts to get back to Spain to reunite with his pregnant partner Mariama. After travelling across the African continent, Ibrahim settles in the vicinity of the Mount Gurugu near Nador with a group of people seeking to jump the border fence to Melilla, including Aminata and Ousman.

== Cast ==
- Moussa Sylla as Ibrahim
- Edith Martínez-Val as Aminata
- Eric Nantchouang as Ousman
- Nansi Nsue as Mariama
- Vicky Peña as Hermana Marisa
- Mariola Fuentes as Carmela
- Vicenta N'Dongo as Elena Jiménez
- Mari Paz Sayago
- Norberto Trujillo
- Justino Mendes

== Production ==
The film is a Spanish-French co-production by Cine 365 Films Canarias AIE, Cine365 Films Producciones Cinematográficas, Virtual Contenidos, Castelao Pictures and Noodles Productions. It had the participation of ICAA, Orange, Movistar Plus+, RTVE, and Canal Sur. Shooting locations included Madrid and Tenerife.

== Release ==
The film world premiered at the 27th Málaga Film Festival on 3 March 2024. Distributed by Filmax, it was released theatrically in Spain on 12 April 2024.

== Reception ==
Javier Ocaña of Cinemanía rated the film 2½ out of 5 stars, writing that there were "little cinema and a lot of good intentions", while also assessing the film to be the worse picture so far of Zambrano's solid career.

Salvador Llopart of La Vanguardia rated the film 2 out of 5 stars, lamenting that "the protagonists turn out to be schematic ideas rather than real characters".

Laura Pérez of Fotogramas rated the film 3 out of 5 stars, assessing that it "is overly explanatory", but also writing that "it takes flight in the sequence of the fence jumping".

Carlos Boyero of El País lamented that "it took so long for the horror [of the ending] to arrive" (in which "everything is truthful and terrible" to him) [because] he found the film to be "easy and predictable" before.

== See also ==
- List of Spanish films of 2024
