= Second Honeymoon =

Second Honeymoon may refer to:

== Film and television ==
- Second Honeymoon (1930 film), an American silent film directed by Phil Rosen
- Second Honeymoon (1937 film), an American comedy directed by Walter Lang
- "Second Honeymoon", a 1956 episode of I Love Lucy
- Second Honeymoon (1966 film), a British television film starring Arthur Askey
- Second Honeymoon (2001 film), a film starring Roma Downey
- Second Honeymoon (TV series), a 1987 Canadian game show

== Other media ==
- Second Honeymoon (novel), by James Patterson and Howard Roughan, 2013
- Second Honeymoon, a 2006 novel by Joanna Trollope
- 2nd Honeymoon, the 1976 debut album by English art-pop band Deaf School
- "Second Honeymoon" (song), by Johnny Cash, 1960

== See also ==
- Honeymoon (disambiguation)
