= Julio Fernández (film producer) =

Spanish film producer (1947–2025)

Julio Fernández Rodríguez (26 July 1947 – 17 November 2025) was a Spanish film producer.

== Life and career ==
Fernández was born in Cereixido, province of Lugo, on 26 July 1947. He was a member of the Academy of Cinematographic Arts and Sciences of Spain, vice-president of the Federation of Associations of Spanish Audiovisual Producers (FAPAE), a member of the board of directors of the Entity for the Management of Audiovisual Producers' Rights (EGEDA), a trustee of the private foundation Cinema and Audiovisual School of Catalonia (ESCAC), and president of the Association of Galician Entrepreneurs of Catalonia (AEGA-CAT).

In 1987, he acquired Filmax. In 2002, he was awarded the Castelao Medal.

In February 2009, Fernández was accused by the Prosecutor's Office of Catalonia of hoarding assets and misappropriation for decapitalizing the company Ivex Films. Such accusations were proven baseless, and he was fully acquitted by the Court. “Absuelven al productor de cine, Julio Fernández, acusado de descapitalizar Ivex Films“

Fernández died in Miami on 17 November 2025, at the age of 78.
