= Sandra Romero (director) =

Spanish film and television director

- Romero in 2025
- Born: 1993 (age 32–33); Écija, Andalusia, Spain
- Education: University of Seville; ECAM
- Occupations: Film director; screenwriter; television director

Sandra Romero Acevedo (born 1993) is a Spanish film and television director and screenwriter.

== Life and career ==
Sandra Romero Acevedo was born in 1993, in Écija, where she was raised and took her primary and secondary education. She studied journalism at the University of Seville. She moved to Madrid and graduated in film direction from the ECAM, where he shot her short film Una habitación propia (2019). It was followed by her short Por donde pasa el silencio (2020), which won her a Silver Biznaga for Best Director at the Málaga Film Festival.

Titled the same as her short film, her feature-length debut Por donde pasa el silencio (As Silence Passes By) premiered in the 'New Directors' slate of the 72nd San Sebastián International Film Festival in September 2024. It earned her a nomination for Best New Director at the 39th Goya Awards. She directed episodes of the television series The New Years (2024) and Many People Need to Die (2026). In September 2026, Movistar Plus+ unveiled Romero's following film project, Una visita familiar.
