= The Monster of Many Noses =

- Theatrical release poster
- Catalan: L'home dels nassos
- Directed by: Abigail Schaaff
- Screenplay by: Eric Moral; Núria Velasco
- Produced by: Núria Velasco; Lina Badenes; Ana Camacho
- Starring: Pablo Derqui; Ivan Benet; Sali Diallo; Miranda Munné; Lluc Miravete
- Cinematography: José Cachón
- Edited by: Ana Charte
- Music by: Laetitia Pansanel
- Production companies: Aguacate & Calabaza Films; Turanga Films; Inaudita; LHome Dels Nassos AIE; Halley Production
- Distributed by: Filmax
- Release date: 19 January 2024 (Spain)
- Countries: Spain; France
- Language: Catalan

The Monster of Many Noses (Catalan: L'home dels nassos) is a 2024 fantasy adventure drama film directed by Abigail Schaaff (in her directorial debut feature) from a screenplay by Èric G. Moral and Núria Velasco.

== Plot ==
Set in 1968 in the fictional small mountain village of Vallviva, the plot follows three kids as they escape from the legendary Man of Many Noses, a monster hunting down lying children. Past lies involving the entry of the Francoist forces into the village in 1938 also come into play.

== Cast ==
- Pablo Derqui as Pau Monsó
- Ivan Benet as Joan Farré
- Jeannine Mestre as Eulàlia Monsó (grandmother)
- Maria Molins as Eulàlia Monsó (adult)
- Malcom McCarthy as Owo
- Mercè Llorens as Júlia
- Jorge Motos as Pau Monsó (young)
- Berner Maynés as Joan Farré (young)
- Pep Munné as capitán nacional
- Sali Diallo as Clara Monsó (girl)
- Miranda Munné as Lali Monsó (girl)
- Lluc Miravete as Ventura Farré (boy)

== Production ==
The Monster of Many Noses is an Aguacate & Calabaza Films Spanish-French co-production with Turanga Films, Inaudita, LHome Dels Nassos AIE, and Halley Production. Shooting locations in Catalonia included Mura, Castellterçol, Riudarenes, Gualba and L'Ametlla del Vallès.

== Release ==
Distributed by Filmax in Spain, the film was released theatrically on 19 January 2024.

== Reception ==
Philipp Engel of La Vanguardia rated the film 2 out of 5 stars, writing that "dour and formally flat", [the film] "culminates in a somewhat embarrassing patriotic ending".

Blai Morell of Fotogramas rated the film 3 out of 5 stars, praising its honesty and Pablo Derqui's performance while lamenting that the film falls short on the fantasy side.

== See also ==
- List of Spanish films of 2024
