= Babies Don't Come with Instructions =

- Theatrical release poster
- Spanish: Sin instrucciones
- Directed by: Marina Seresesky
- Written by: Marta Sánchez; Irene Niubó
- Based on: Instructions Not Included by Guillermo Ríos, Leticia López Margalli, and Eugenio Derbez
- Produced by: Álvaro Alonso; Manuel Yebra; Carlos Juárez
- Starring: Paco León; Maia Zaitegi; Silvia Alonso; Malcolm Treviño-Sitté; Yailene Sierra
- Cinematography: Kenneth Oribe
- Edited by: Irene Blecua; Elsa Fernández
- Music by: Zacarías M. de la Riva
- Production companies: La Pepa Films; Basque Films; Demasiados Enemigos AIE
- Distributed by: Warner Bros. Pictures
- Release date: 25 December 2024
- Running time: 99 minutes
- Country: Spain
- Language: Spanish

Babies Don't Come with Instructions (Spanish: Sin instrucciones) is a 2024 Spanish comedy-drama film directed by Marina Seresesky and written by Marta Sánchez and Irene Niubó based on the 2013 Mexican film Instructions Not Included. It stars Maia Zaitegi, Paco León, and Silvia Alonso.

== Plot ==
After Leo is dumped a baby girl (Alba) by his former fling Julia (who just disappears) in the Canary Islands, Leo moves to Bilbao to search unsuccessfully for Julia and grows fond of Alba instead as they become a family against the odds. They are upended by the eventual return of Julia demanding the custody of the girl eight years later.

== Cast ==
- Paco León as Leo
- Maia Zaitegi as Alba
- Silvia Alonso as Julia
- Malcolm Treviño-Sitté as Modu
- Yailene Sierra as Elisa
- Amber Shana Williams as Sali
- Gorka Aguinagalde
- Younes Bachir

== Production ==
The film was produced by La Pepa Films, Basque Films, and Demasiados Enemigos AIE and it had the participation of Atresmedia and Netflix. It boasted a budget of €2.7 million. It was shot in Biscay (including the Doña Casilda Iturrizar Park, the Vizcaya Bridge, the Casco Viejo, MercaBilbao and Guggenheim Museum Bilbao) and Gran Canaria (including Acantilado del Farallón, Maspalomas, and Playa de Las Burras).

== Release ==
Distributed by Warner Bros. Pictures, the film was released theatrically in Spain on 25 December 2024.

== Reception ==
Juan Pando of Fotogramas rated the film 4 out of 5 stars, declaring it a "splendid showcase of family cinema with humor, drama and positive values".

== Accolades ==
Year	Award	Category	Nominee(s)	Result	Ref.
2025	4th Carmen Awards	Best Actor	Paco León	Nominated	
2025	4th Carmen Awards	Best Original Song	"La vida no avisa" by Riki Rivera and Violetta Arriaza	Nominated	

== See also ==
- List of Spanish films of 2024
