= Filmax =

Spanish film production company

Filmax International
- Founded: 1953; 73 years ago
- Founder: Alfredo Talarewitz
- Headquarters: Barcelona, Spain
- Services: Film production, film distribution
- Website: www.filmax.com

Filmax International is a Spanish motion picture production company and film distributor based in Barcelona, and one of Spain's largest integrated film and television groups. It produced the REC horror series, and owns the Nirvana Films and New World Films International distributors and the Fantastic Factory label, dedicated to create fantasy films in the horror, science fiction and action genres as imagined in 1998 by Brian Yuzna and Julio Fernández.

At different times, Filmax has entered into distribution agreements with Paramount, Lauren Films, Lakeshore, Summit, Fintage House, Nu lmage, Annapurna and Freeway.

== History ==
The company was founded in 1953 by Alfredo Talarewitz, as a distributor of Hollywood films. From 1955 onwards, it collaborated with Spanish production company Balcázar Producciones Cinematográficas.

Between 1963 and 1968, the company signed a distribution agreement in Spain with Paramount Pictures to distribute the films from its catalog.

The company was acquired in 1987 by Julio Fernández Rodríguez.

In 2019, Filmax had distributed over 800 films.

== Releases ==
=== 2020s ===
Filmax films released in the 2020s
Release date (Note: The listed date refers to the film's theatrical release in Spain by Filmax, not necessarily its first screening or when it premiered.)	Title	Director(s)	Ref.
16 September 2022	The House Among the Cactuses	Carlota González-Adrio	
30 September 2022	Lost & Found	Jorge Dorado	
14 October 2022	Piggy	Carlota Pereda	
4 November 2022	Vasil	Avelina Prat	
9 December 2022	The Open Body	Ángeles Huerta	
20 January 2023	The Burning Cold	Santi Trullenque	
27 January 2023	Lobo feroz	Gustavo Hernández Ibañez	
24 February 2023	Irati	Paul Urkijo Alijo	
31 March 2023	Tin & Tina	Rubin Stein	
5 May 2023	In the Company of Women	Sílvia Munt	
9 June 2023	Girl Unknown	Pablo Maqueda	
16 June	Kepler 6B	Alejandro Suárez Lozano	
30 June 2023	Unicorns	Àlex Lora	
6 July 2023	Love & Revolution	Alejandro Marín	
11 August 2023	The Boogeyman: The Origin of the Myth	Ángel Gómez Hernández	
15 September 2023	The Cuckoo's Curse	Mar Targarona	
27 October 2023	Mamacruz	Patricia Ortega	
10 November 2023	The Teacher Who Promised the Sea	Patricia Font	
17 November 2023	The Chapel	Carlota Pereda	
24 November 2023	Andrea's Love	Manuel Martín Cuenca	
12 January 2024	Honeymoon	Enrique Otero	
19 January 2024	The Monster of Many Noses	Abigail Schaaff	
14 February 2024	Idol Affair	Teresa Bellón, César F. Calvillo	
15 March 2024	We Treat Women Too Well	Clara Bilbao	
5 April 2024	Birds Flying East	Pau Durà	
12 April 2024	Jumping the Fence	Benito Zambrano	
26 April 2024	Mamifera	Liliana Torres	
17 May 2024	A Real Job	Thomas Lilti	
31 May 2024	The Sleeping Woman	Laura Alvea	
19 June 2024	Birth	Pau Teixidor	
5 July 2024	Mean Streak	Fer García-Ruiz	
25 July 2024	Norberta	Sonia Escolano, Belén López Albert	
6 September 2024	Last Stop: Rocafort St.	Luis Prieto	
25 October 2024	Rita	Paz Vega	
13 December 2024	May I Speak with the Enemy?	Alexis Morante	
10 January 2025	Dismantling an Elephant	Aitor Echevarría	
7 February 2025	Greedy People	Potsy Ponciroli	
21 February 2025	Daniela Forever	Nacho Vigalondo	
28 March 2025	Fury	Gemma Blasco	
16 April 2025	Our Father, Our President	Manuel Huerga	
9 May 2025	The Portuguese House	Avelina Prat	
30 May 2025	Hamburg	Lino Escalera	
12 June 2025	Join Me for Breakfast	Iván Morales	
20 June 2025	Virgins	Álvaro Díaz Lorenzo	
19 September 2025	My Friend Eva	Cesc Gay	
26 September 2025	The Treasure of Barracuda	Adrià García	
14 November 2025	Gaua	Paul Urkijo Alijo	
5 December 2025	Amira's Land	Roberto Jiménez	
12 December 2025	Frontier	Judith Colell	
23 January 2026	The Virgin of the Quarry Lake	Laura Casabé	
6 March 2026	The Devil Within	Rubén Pérez-Barrena	
3 July 2026	Bros	Carol Rodríguez Colás, Marina Rodríguez Colás	

== Fantastic Factory ==
American producer Brian Yuzna and Spanish producer Julio Fernández founded Fantastic Factory in 1998 and was Spain's first major production house to specialize in horror films with a notable lean towards the international market. Yuzna stated his goal with the studio was to establish a business model similar to other independent horror producers like American International Pictures and Hammer Film Productions. Yuzna's approach to the company saw him utilize seasoned imported American talent such as himself, Stuart Gordon, and Jack Sholder helming certain projects while also fostering locally procured Spanish directors for other projects made by the company. From 2000-2005, the company produced nine films all of which were shot in English. Fantastic Factory is seen as laying the groundwork for more successful Spanish genre film making and filmmakers such as the [•REC] film series directed by Fantastic Factory alums Jaume Balagueró and Paco Plaza.

=== Films ===
Year	Title	Notes
2000	Faust: Love of the Damned	Distributed in the United States by Lionsgate.
2001	Arachnid	Distributed in the United States by Lionsgate
2001	Dagon	Distributed in the United States by Lionsgate
2002	Darkness	Distributed in the United States by Miramax Films.
2003	Beyond Re-Animator	Distributed in the United States by Lionsgate
2004	Romasanta	Distributed in the United States by Lionsgate
2004	Rottweiler	Distributed in the United States by Lionsgate
2005	The Nun	Distributed in the United States by Lionsgate
2005	Beneath Still Waters	Distributed in the United States by Lionsgate
