= Honeymoon Bridge =

Honeymoon Bridge may refer to:

- Honeymoon Bridge (New Hampshire), a covered bridge in Jackson, New Hampshire, United States
- Honeymoon Bridge (Ontario), an international bridge linking Niagara Falls, Canada to Niagara Falls, U.S.; collapsed in 1938
- Honeymoon Bridge (game), a variation of the card game known as bridge
