= Stories (film) =

- Theatrical release poster
- Spanish: Historias
- Directed by: Paco Sepúlveda
- Screenplay by: Paco Sepúlveda
- Starring: Juan Diego; Fernando Tejero; Maggie Civantos; Eduardo Blanco; Aura Garrido; Emilio Gutiérrez-Caba; Luisa Gavasa; Manuel Morón
- Cinematography: David Hebrero
- Edited by: Manu Huelva
- Music by: Hernán González; Gabriel Casacuberta
- Production companies: Guainot Produce; Mother Superior Films; Avant Events; Bastardas Films
- Distributed by: Vértice 360
- Release dates: 7 March 2024 (Málaga); 24 May 2024 (Spain)
- Countries: Spain; Uruguay
- Language: Spanish

Stories (Spanish: Historias) is a 2024 Spanish-Uruguayan anthology drama film written and directed by Paco Sepúlveda featuring an ensemble cast.

== Plot ==
The plot consists of 11 standalone vignettes exploring personal relationships.

== Cast ==
- Juan Diego
- Cocó Jiménez
- Maggie Civantos
- Fernando Tejero
- Aura Garrido
- Emilio Gutiérrez Caba
- Luisa Gavasa
- Eduardo Blanco
- Manuel Morón
- Malena Narvay
- Diego Domínguez
- Albert Baró
- Helena Kaittani
- Edu Rejón
- Nahuel Picone
- Sauce Ena
- Alejandro Martínez
- Beatriz Torres
- Manuel Baldé
- Júlia Miró
- Amaia Sancristóbal
- Enzo Lombardi

== Production ==
Stories was produced by Guainot Produce, Mother Superior Films, Avant Events, and Bastardas Films. It was shot in Madrid, Cádiz, and Montevideo.

== Release ==
The film was presented at the 27th Málaga Film Festival on 7 March 2024. Distributed by Vértice 360, it was released theatrically in Spain on 24 May 2024.

== Reception ==
Víctor A. Gómez of La Opinión de Málaga lamented Historias to be corny, otherwise pointing that everything in the film "is bland, lacks emotional punch, is developed from commonplaces" and "is presented in a poor and hackneyed visual language".

Carmen L. Lobo of La Razón rated the film 3 out of 5 stars, describing as an "uneven, sometimes great, sometimes too condensed" film.

Javier Escribano Muñoz of HobbyConsolas gave the film 60 points ('acceptable'), highlighting the "masterful" performances among the best things about the film, while citing the "redundant" or "incomplete" nature of some of the stories, as well as the "off-key" musical score as negative elements.

Manuel J. Lombardo wrote in his single-star review that the film "is unable to lift truth from its many romantic-sentimental platitudes and clichés".

Pablo Vázquez of Fotogramas rated the film 3 out of 5 stars, highlighting the bar episode, featuring an "immense" Manuel Morón, as the film's best.

Sergio F. Pinilla of Cinemanía rated the film 3½ out of 5 stars writing about a series of "uneven" stories, "which find their raison d'être in the cinematographic craft and also in the interpretative talent that emerges from the ensemble".

== Accolades ==
Year	Award	Category	Nominee(s)	Result	Ref.
2025	4th Carmen Awards	Best Actress	Maggie Civantos	Pending	

== See also ==
- List of Spanish films of 2024
