= Mamifera =

- Film poster
- Catalan: Mamífera
- Directed by: Liliana Torres
- Written by: Liliana Torres
- Produced by: Miriam Porté; Carla Sospedra Salvadó
- Starring: Maria Rodríguez Soto; Enric Auquer; Ann Perelló; Anna Alarcón; Ruth Llopis; María Ribera; Marina Rodríguez; Anna Bertran; Amparo Fernández; Mireia Aixalà
- Cinematography: Lucía C. Pan
- Edited by: Sofi Escudé Poulenc
- Music by: Joan Pons Villaró; Jordi Matas Domènech
- Production companies: Distinto Films; Edna Cinema
- Distributed by: Filmax
- Release dates: 8 March 2024 (SXSW); 26 April 2024 (Spain)
- Country: Spain
- Language: Catalan

Mamifera (Catalan: Mamífera) is a 2024 Spanish comedy-drama film directed and written by Liliana Torres which stars Maria Rodríguez Soto and Enric Auquer. It is shot in Catalan.

== Plot ==
The plot examinates 40-year-old Lola's choice not to continue with an unwanted pregnancy with support from partner Bruno.

== Cast ==
- Maria Rodríguez Soto as Lola
- Enric Auquer as Bruno
- Ruth Llopis as Judit
- Anna Alarcón as Paula
- María Ribera as Marta
- Anna Bertran as Íngrid
- Mireia Aixalà as Sònia
- Marina Rodríguez as Valèria
- Ann Perelló as Isa
- Amparo Fernández as Antonia

== Production ==
The film was produced by Distinto Films and Edna Cinema, and it had the co-production of 3Cat, the participation of RTVE and the backing from ICAA, ICEC, and Creative Europe's MEDIA.

== Release ==
The film had its world premiere at the Texas-based South by Southwest Festival on 8 March 2024, International Women's Day. It also made it to the slate of the D'A Film Festival Barcelona. Distributed by Filmax, it will be released theatrically in Spain on 26 April 2024.

== Reception ==
According to the review aggregation website Rotten Tomatoes, Mamifera has a 100% approval rating based on 9 reviews from critics, with an average rating of 8.0/10.

Olivia Popp of Cineuropa wrote that "a powerful sense of weighty realism" is embedded within the film.

Jessi Cape of The Austin Chronicle wrote that the film "tackles an endlessly complicated, often excruciating, sometimes beautiful topic with grace, humor, and easily relatable characters".

Catherine Bray of Variety considered that what the film (an "engaging, well-acted Spanish drama") does so well is "to bring nuance to Lola's situation".

== Accolades ==
Year	Award	Category	Nominee(s)	Result	Ref.
2024	SXSW Film & TV Festival	Special Jury Award for Performance (Narrative Feature Competition)	Maria Rodríguez Soto	Won	
2025	17th Gaudí Awards	Best Film		Pending	
2025	17th Gaudí Awards	Best Actress	Maria Rodríguez Soto	Pending	
2025	17th Gaudí Awards	Best Actor	Enric Auquer	Pending	

== See also ==
- List of Spanish films of 2024
