= Dismantling an Elephant =

- Theatrical release poster
- Spanish: Desmontando un elefante
- Directed by: Aitor Echeverría
- Screenplay by: Aitor Echeverría; Pep Garrido
- Produced by: Ibon Cormenzana; Ignasi Estapé; Sandra Tapia Díaz; Ángel Durández
- Starring: Emma Suárez; Natalia de Molina; Darío Grandinetti; Alba Guilera
- Cinematography: Pau Castejón
- Edited by: Sofi Escudé
- Production companies: Arcadia Motion Pictures; Pegaso Pictures AIE; Noodles Production
- Distributed by: Filmax (es)
- Release dates: 9 November 2024 (Seville); 10 January 2025 (Spain)
- Countries: Spain; France
- Language: Spanish

Dismantling an Elephant (Spanish: Desmontando un elefante) is a 2024 drama film directed by Aitor Echeverría starring Emma Suárez and Natalia de Molina alongside Darío Grandinetti and Alba Guilera.

== Plot ==
Recovering alcoholic architect Marga returns home after a spell in a detox centre, upending her younger daughter Blanca's career aspirations as a professional dancer.

== Cast ==
- Emma Suárez as Marga
- Natalia de Molina as Blanca
- Darío Grandinetti as Félix
- Alba Guilera as María

== Production ==
The film was produced by Arcadia Motion Pictures alongside Pegaso Pictures AIE and Noodles Production. Filming began in Barcelona on 26 May 2023. Shooting locations in Barcelona included the 'Granel' centre for performing arts and a house/architecture office in Sant Gervasi. Barcelona also stood in for the fictional setting of Bordeaux.

== Release ==
The film premiered at the 21st Seville European Film Festival on 9 November 2024. It also made it to the 'Panorama' strand of the 39th Mar del Plata International Film Festival. Distributed by Filmax, it is scheduled to be released theatrically in Spain on 10 January 2025.

== Reception ==
Alfonso Rivera of Cineuropa wrote that Echeverría opted for "a cold, collected, elegant and distant form of mise-en-scène".

== Accolades ==
Year	Award	Category	Nominee(s)	Result	Ref.
2025	4th Carmen Awards	Best Actress	Natalia de Molina	Nominated	

== See also ==
- List of Spanish films of 2025
