= As Silence Passes By =

- Theatrical release poster
- Spanish: Por donde pasa el silencio
- Directed by: Sandra Romero
- Screenplay by: Sandra Romero
- Starring: Antonio Araque; Javier Araque; María Araque; Mona Martínez; Nico Montoya; Emmanuel Medina; Tamara Casellas
- Cinematography: Angello Faccini
- Edited by: Cristóbal Fernández
- Music by: Paloma Peñarrubia
- Production companies: Mammut; Playa Chica; Icónica Producciones; Auna Producciones; Pasa el silencio AIE
- Distributed by: BTeam Pictures
- Release dates: 25 September 2024 (Zinemaldia); 29 November 2024 (Spain)
- Country: Spain
- Language: Spanish

As Silence Passes By (Spanish: Por donde pasa el silencio) is a 2024 Spanish drama film written and directed by Sandra Romero (in her directorial debut feature).

== Plot ==
Antonio, who earns a living as a waiter, returns from Madrid to his hometown of Écija during the Holy Week to look for his twin brother Javier, who needs his help.

== Cast ==
- Antonio Araque as Antonio
- Javier Araque
- María Araque
- Mona Martínez
- Nicolás Montoya
- Emmanuel Medina
- Tamara Casellas

== Production ==
As Silence Passes By is a Mammut, Playa Chica, Icónica, Auna Producciones and Pasa el silencio AIE production with the participation of RTVE, Canal Sur and Filmin. It was shot in Écija and Carmona.

== Release ==
The film world premiered in the 'New Directors' slate of the 72nd San Sebastián International Film Festival on 25 September 2024. Distributed by BTeam Pictures, it was released theatrically in Spain on 29 November 2024.

== Reception ==
Cédric Succivalli of International Cinephile Society rated the film 4½ out of 5 stars, billing it as "a very simple film about enormously challenging ideas".

Alfonso Rivera of Cineuropa deemed the film to be "a harsh, gritty portrait of family relations in which people sometimes don't love each other in a healthy way, a lack of communication reigns and people are overly demanding".

Javier Ocaña of El País described Romero's "notable" debut film as "a work full of harshness and anger, but also of love and warmth, about a family like any other. From the countryside, of course".

== Accolades ==
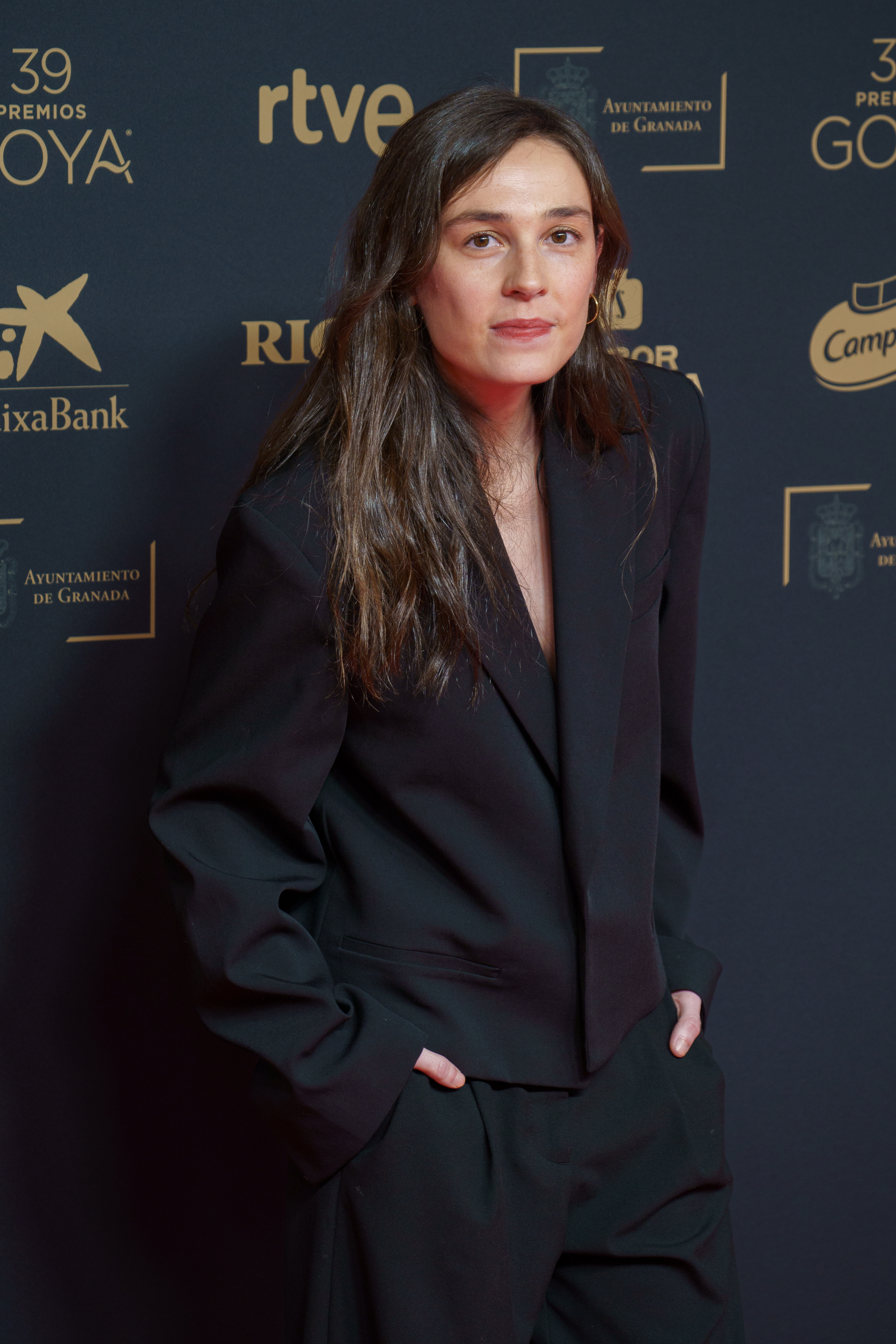
Sandra Romero attending the 39th Goya Awards.

Year	Award	Category	Nominee(s)	Result	Ref.
2025	4th Carmen Awards	Best New Director	Sandra Romero	Nominated	
2025	4th Carmen Awards	Best Adapted Screenplay	Sandra Romero	Nominated	
2025	4th Carmen Awards	Best New Actor	Antonio Araque	Nominated	
2025	4th Carmen Awards	Best New Actor	Javier Araque	Nominated	
2025	4th Carmen Awards	Best New Actress	María Araque	Nominated	
2025	39th Goya Awards	Best New Director	Sandra Romero	Nominated	

== See also ==
- List of Spanish films of 2024
