= Pablo Gómez-Pando =

Pablo Gómez-Pando (born 1983) is a Spanish stage and screen actor.

== Life and career ==
Gómez-Pando was born in Seville in 1983. His grandparents are from Liébana. Graduated in drama from Escuela Superior de Arte Dramático de Sevilla, he further trained his acting chops at the Juan Carlos Corazza acting school and La Abadía. His television career began with appearances in series such as Hospital Central, Cuéntame cómo pasó, Yo soy Bea, and Amar en tiempos revueltos. As early as 2012, he starred as the lead in El Buscón, a stage adaptation of Quevedo's El Buscón, with the Seville Classical Theatre Company. With the aforementioned company, he starred in a play of Hamlet, winning a Lorca Award of Andalusian theatre in 2016. In 2014, he featured as 'Hombre Alto' in Animales nocturnos, a play of the text by Juan Mayorga staged by El Aedo Teatro.

Early film work include his appearances in Antoni Cuadri's Thomas vive (2014) and Fernando Franco's Dying (2017). He also appeared in When Angels Sleep (2018) and played Nando in Bye.

He played Melo in the second season of ByAnaMilán. He earned a nomination at the 32nd Actors and Actresses Union Awards for his supporting role as a philosophy teacher in the mystery television series The Invisible Girl. Likewise he won Best Leading Actor at the 4th Carmen Awards for his performance as Paco in the 2024 comedy film Alone in the Night set against the backdrop of the 23 February 1981 coup attempt. He described his character as "someone tender, scared out of their wits, who embarks on a journey to find the antidote to that fear and move toward courage". In 2026, he featured in the films The Beloved (where he portrayed an assistant director) and The Light.
