= Fintage House =

Dutch company based in The Hague

- Industry: Entertainment Assets
- Founded: 1986
- Headquarters: The Hague, The Netherlands
- Key people: Robbert Aarts (Co Chairman); Niels Teves (Co Chairman)
- Website: Fintage House

Fintage House is an independent company that deals with film, TV and up until the end of 2016, music rights. It was established in 1986 and is co-chaired by Robbert Aarts and Niels Teves. Fintage is based in The Hague, the Netherlands and provides its services through an affiliated office in Budapest, Hungary as well as representatives in the United States, Canada, Australia, Japan, Italy and Spain. In 2008 the company had approximately 70 employees worldwide with 50 of these based in Europe. The company's expertise lie in revenue collection and reporting for rights owners through the protection of money streams as well as actively finding new revenue streams. Fintage House were the first to account for revenue streams monthly rather than annually.

Initially the company dealt primarily in Film & TV but have since focused on the music business until the sale of the division to Kobalt. Fintage Film & Television represents production and sales companies. Fintage House Links with Online B2B Marketplace. Fintage House still operates in the Film, TV realm with services such as Collection Account Management and Audiovisual Producer Rights. Fintage House's music clients included Britney Spears, the Elvis Presley estate, Anna Netrebko, Jason Mraz, The Black Eyed Peas and Foo Fighters.

== History ==
In 2002, Fintage House completed a management buyout with offices spanning Europe, Australia, Japan and the US, from the Netherlands' MeesPierson Bank. Fintage serve over 1000 film and TV companies including: Terminator 3: Rise of the Machines, Crash, The Hurt Locker, District 9, Paranormal Activity, Terminator Salvation, Single Man, Broken Embraces, Precious, The Messenger, Nine, An Education, Young Victoria, Food, Inc., The Last Station.

In 2010, the company linked with Mediapeers offering an online platform for sellers and buyers of content e.g. films & TV series.

In 2012, Fintage House made an investment in UK-based Rights Agency Limited. Acquisition of Rights Agency Ltd added clients such as Phil Collins, Mumford and Sons (from discreet revolution). Fintage House was recommended by John J. Lee Jr. and Anne Marie Gillen in their book The Producer's Business Handbook: the roadmap for the balanced film producer and that Fintage House "been the collection account manager of hundreds of film and television productions and 99 percent of the independent world works with them: Woody Allen, Relativity, Summit, Lionsgate, to name a few."

In 2012, CASHét Card LLC was launched in July with the backing of Fintage House and Film Finances, Inc. The card is designed for Film and TV productions to provide companies with cash back when used.

In 2015, Imagem and Fintage House announced the launch of FIM, a joint-venture to provide global neighbouring right services for a broad range of Imagem clients across musical genres.

Every year to coincide with the world-famous Cannes Film Festival, Fintage House and Akin Gump organise the Jorge Gallegos Memorial Trophy, Annual Boules Tournament. This prestigious event combines the sport of pétanque with a relaxed and informal cocktail party and is attended by the who’s who of the film and television world. The tournament takes place in May on the Promenade de la Croisette, Cannes, France. All proceeds from the Boules event directly benefit humanitarian organisation, FilmAid international.
