= Alfonso Sánchez Fernández =

Spanish actor

Alfonso Sánchez
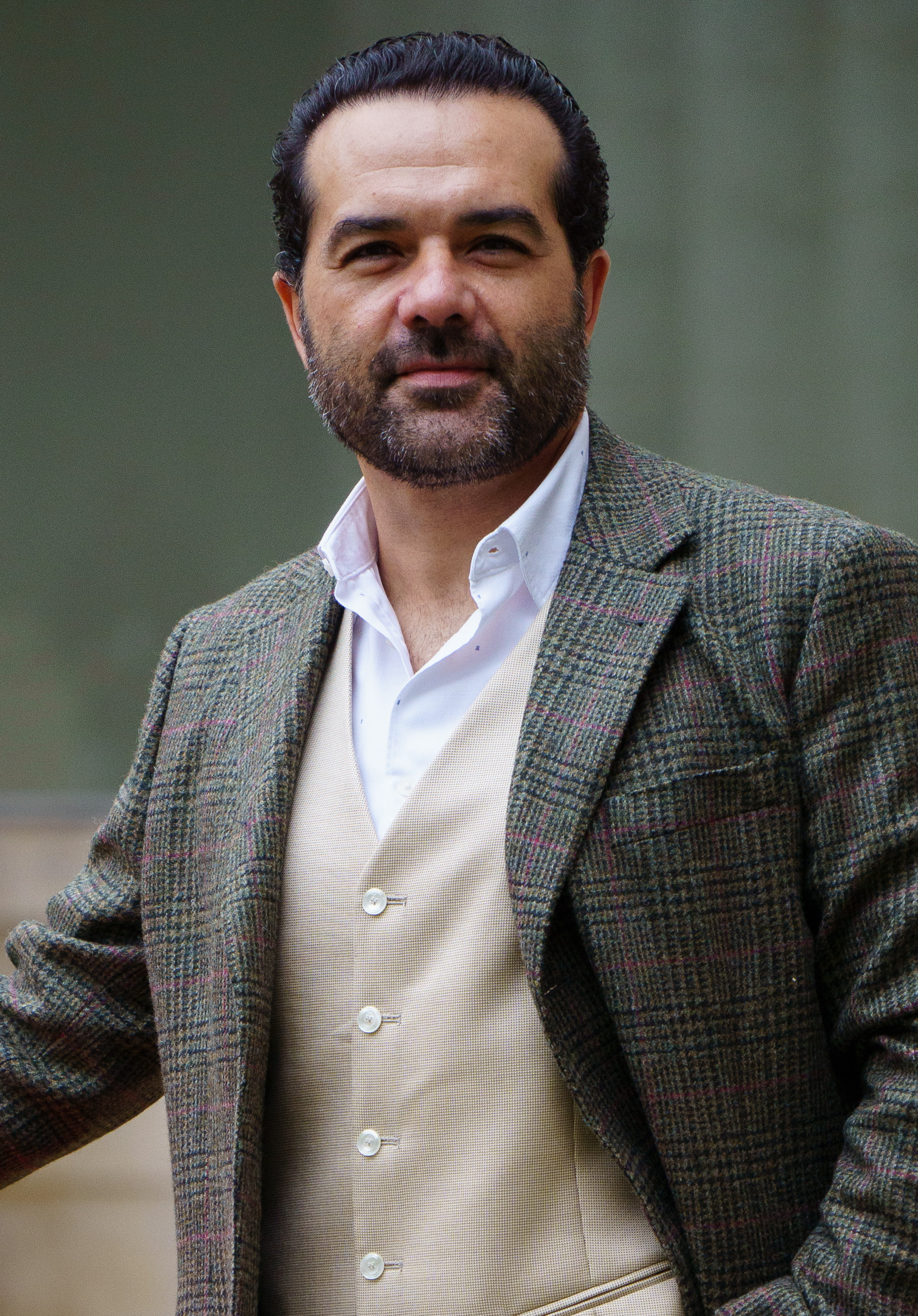
- Sánchez in 2025
- Born: Alfonso Sánchez Fernández; 1978 (age 47–48); Seville, Spain
- Occupations: Actor; film director; screenwriter; comedian

Alfonso Sánchez Fernández (born 1978) is a Spanish actor and filmmaker from Andalusia. He is known as a member of the comedy duo Los compadres alongside Alberto López.

== Life and career ==
Alfonso Sánchez Fernández was born in Seville in 1978. He moved to Málaga to pursue studies on audiovisual communication and dramatic art. His television acting credits include appearances in Plaza Alta (his small screen debut), Policías, en el corazón de la calle, ¡Ala... Dina!, London Street, Paco y Veva, Aquí no hay quien viva, El auténtico Rodrigo Leal, Arrayán, Los hombres de Paco, Herederos, and Allí abajo.

His film acting credits include roles in Unit 7 (2012), Spanish Affair (2014), Spanish Affair 2 (2016), Contigo no, bicho (2018), and Alone in the Night (2024).

He has directed the full-length films El mundo es nuestro (2012), El mundo es suyo (2017), Para toda la muerte (2020), and El mundo es vuestro (2022) all in which he also stars together with Alberto López, as well as Superagente Makey (2020) and Sembrando sueños (2023; a documentary about the Quintero brothers), and Pendaripen (2025; a documentary about the discrimination against the Romani people).

== Accolades ==
Year	Association	Category	Nominated work	Result	Ref.
2012	Málaga Film Festival	Zonazine Competition: Silver Biznaga - Best Actor	El mundo es nuestro	Won	
2013	CEC Medals	Best New Director	El mundo es nuestro	Won	
2013	22nd Actors and Actresses Union Awards	Best Film Actor in a Minor Role	Unit 7	Won	
2025	4th Carmen Awards	Best Supporting Actor	Alone in the Night	Nominated	
