= Palacio de la Merced =

Coordinates: 37.8904°N 4.7801°W

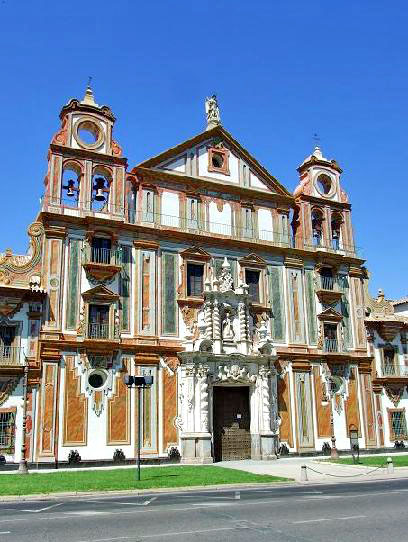
Main façade.

The Palacio de la Merced is a historical building in Córdoba, Andalusia, southern Spain. Once home to the convent of La Merced Calzada, it is now home to the Provincial Government of Córdoba (Diputación de Córdoba, in Spanish), a sovra-municipal services institution of the province of Córdoba.

== History ==
Excavations in the site have revealed the presence of ancient Roman ashlars. Later findings include medieval remains of a baptistery and of a crypt, identified with the Palaeo-Christian or Visigothic basilica of St. Eulalia, assigned by some scholars to the reign of king Reccared I.

The foundation of the palace is traditionally connected to Peter Nolasco, whom king Ferdinand III of Castile had donated the Basilica of St. Eulalia after the conquest of the city in the early 13th century. There are few traces of the 13th convent, however. The current edifice dates to the 18th century, the church dating to 1716-1745. The later has a Latin cross plan, with a nave, two aisles and a transept. The cloister, with a rectangular plan and round arches, was finished in 1752.

Some renovations occurred in 1850, when it became a hospital, and 1960, when it became the seat of the Provincial Deputy. In 1978 the church suffered a fire that destroyed the high altar and other artworks.
