= Honeymoon (2023 film) =

- Theatrical release poster
- Directed by: Enrique Otero
- Screenplay by: Roberto G. Méndez; Enrique Otero
- Starring: Javier Gutiérrez; Nathalie Poza; María Vázquez; Silvia Zirui Zhou; Fernando Albizu; Antonio Durán "Morris"; Pablo Derqui; María Tasende; Desiré Pillado; Mikel Insua; Berta Ojea; Miguel Ángel Tobías; Sergio Zearreta; César Martínez "Goldi"; Susana Dans; Marta Lado
- Cinematography: Sergio Franco
- Edited by: Adrián Pino
- Music by: Pablo Sanmamed
- Production companies: Accamedia; Control Z
- Distributed by: Filmax
- Release dates: 15 March 2023 (Málaga); 12 January 2024 (Spain)
- Running time: 90 minutes
- Country: Spain
- Language: Spanish

Honeymoon is a 2023 Spanish film directed by Enrique Otero from a screenplay by Roberto G. Méndez and Enrique Otero which stars Javier Gutiérrez and Nathalie Poza. It straddles halfway the road movie, the thriller, and the black comedy genres.

== Plot ==
Following the news concerning the death of their son Jonás far from home, Carlos and Eva, in an already crumbling marriage, face the prospect of repatriating the remains of their son while being in a dire economic situation, taking extreme choices.

== Cast ==
- Nathalie Poza as Eva
- Javier Gutiérrez as Carlos
- María Vázquez as Rebeca Santos
- Silvia Zhou as Sayaka
- Antonio Durán "Morris" as Mario
- Miquel Insua as Antonio
- Pablo Derqui as Víctor
- María Tasende as Leticia
- Fernando Albizu as Andrés
- Berta Ojea
- Desiré Pillado as Lucía
- Sergio Zearreta
- Miguel Angel Tobías
- César Martínez "Goldi"
- Susana Dans
- Marta Lado

== Production ==
The film is an Accamedia and Control Z production, with the participation of CTVG and CreaSGR, and support from Diputación Provincial de Ourense, Valladolid Film Commission and Diputación de Zamora. Shooting locations in Galicia and Castile and León included Ourense, Culleredo, Arteixo, O Grove, Santiago de Compostela, Teo, Villafáfila, and the Villanubla Airport.

== Release ==
Honeymoon premiered in the non-competitive 'Malaga Premiere' section of the 26th Málaga Film Festival on 15 March 2023. Distributed by Filmax, it was released theatrically in Spain on 12 January 2024.

== Reception ==
Toni Vall of Cinemanía rated the film 3 out of 5 stars, underscoring that "you do not always understand it, but it is quite addictive" in the verdict.

Jordi Batlle Caminal of Fotogramas rated the film 3 out of 5 stars, deeming it to be "as easy to watch as to forget" as well as "functional, light entertainment" in which Gutiérrez and Poza are in their element.

== See also ==
- List of Spanish films of 2024
