= Honeymoon Bridge (game) =

Honeymoon Bridge is a term for various forms of two-player Bridge games. Variants include Double Dummy where four hands are dealt, as in Contract Bridge.
