= Alone in the Night (2024 film) =

- Theatrical release poster
- Spanish: Solos en la noche
- Directed by: Guillermo Rojas
- Written by: Guillermo Rojas
- Produced by: Guillermo Rojas; Olmo Figueredo González-Quevedo
- Starring: Pablo Gómez-Pando; Andrea Carballo; Félix Gómez; Alfonso Sánchez; Paula Usero; Beatriz Arjona; Jacinto Bobo
- Cinematography: Alejandro Espadero
- Edited by: Manuel Terceño
- Music by: Miguel Rivera
- Production companies: Summer Films; La Claqueta PC; Brandon y Brenda la película AIE
- Distributed by: Summer Films
- Release dates: 7 March 2024 (Málaga); 20 September 2024 (Spain)
- Country: Spain
- Language: Spanish

Alone in the Night (Spanish: Solos en la noche) is a 2024 Spanish comedy-drama film written, directed, and produced by Guillermo Rojas. It stars Pablo Gómez-Pando, Andrea Carballo, Beatriz Arjona, Félix Gómez, Alfonso Sánchez, and Paula Usero. It is set against the backdrop of the 23 February 1981 attempted coup d'état.

== Plot ==
Set in an indeterminate town of Andalusia, the plot follows a group of left-wing labor lawyers hiding in a house upon the onset of the 23 February 1981 attempted coup d'état.

== Cast ==
- Pablo Gómez-Pando as Paco
- Andrea Carballo as Adriana
- Beatriz Arjona as Carmen
- Félix Gómez as Toni
- Alfonso Sánchez as Manolo
- Paula Usero as Marisol
- Jacinto Bobo as Pepe

== Production ==
Alone in the Night was produced by Summer Films alongside La Claqueta PC and Brandon y Brenda la película AIE with the participation of Canal Sur Radio y Televisión, and backing from AAIICC, Ibermedia, and Ayuntamiento de Priego de Córdoba. Shooting locations included Utrera and Priego de Córdoba.

== Release ==
The film premiered in the non-competitive slate of the 27th Málaga Film Festival on 7 March 2024. Filmin took over theatrical and streaming distribution. Eventually distributed by Summer Films, Alone in the Night was released theatrically in Spain on 20 September 2024.

== Reception ==
Yago García of Cinemanía rated the film 3 out of 5 stars, billing it as a gentle look at a time and events that call [instead] for vitriol.

== Accolades ==
| Year | Award | Category | Nominee(s) | Result | Ref. |
|---|---|---|---|---|---|
| 2025 | 4th Carmen Awards | Best Film | | Nominated | |
| 2025 | 4th Carmen Awards | Best Director | Guillermo Rojas | Nominated | |
| 2025 | 4th Carmen Awards | Best Original Screenplay | Guillermo Rojas | Nominated | |
| 2025 | 4th Carmen Awards | Best Actor | Pablo Gómez-Pando | Won | |
| 2025 | 4th Carmen Awards | Best Supporting Actress | Beatriz Arjona | Nominated | |
| 2025 | 4th Carmen Awards | Best Supporting Actor | Alfonso Sánchez | Nominated | |
| 2025 | 4th Carmen Awards | Best Supporting Actor | Félix Gómez | Nominated | |
| 2025 | 4th Carmen Awards | Best New Actor | Fran Pérez | Nominated | |
| 2025 | 4th Carmen Awards | Best Cinematography | Alejandro Espadero | Nominated | |
| 2025 | 4th Carmen Awards | Best Art Direction | Pilar Angulo | Nominated | |
| 2025 | 4th Carmen Awards | Best Production Supervision | Fidel Pérez | Nominated | |
| 2025 | 4th Carmen Awards | Best Original Song | "Solos en la noche" by Miguel Rivera, Guillermo Rojas | Nominated | |
| 2025 | 4th Carmen Awards | Best Costume Design | Rocío Olid | Nominated | |
| 2025 | 4th Carmen Awards | Best Makeup and Hairstyles | Anabel Beato, Gloria García | Nominated | |
| 2025 | 4th Carmen Awards | Best Special Effects | Joaquín Ortega, Amparo Martínez Barco | Nominated | |

== See also ==
- List of Spanish films of 2024
