= Beatriz Arjona =

Spanish actress

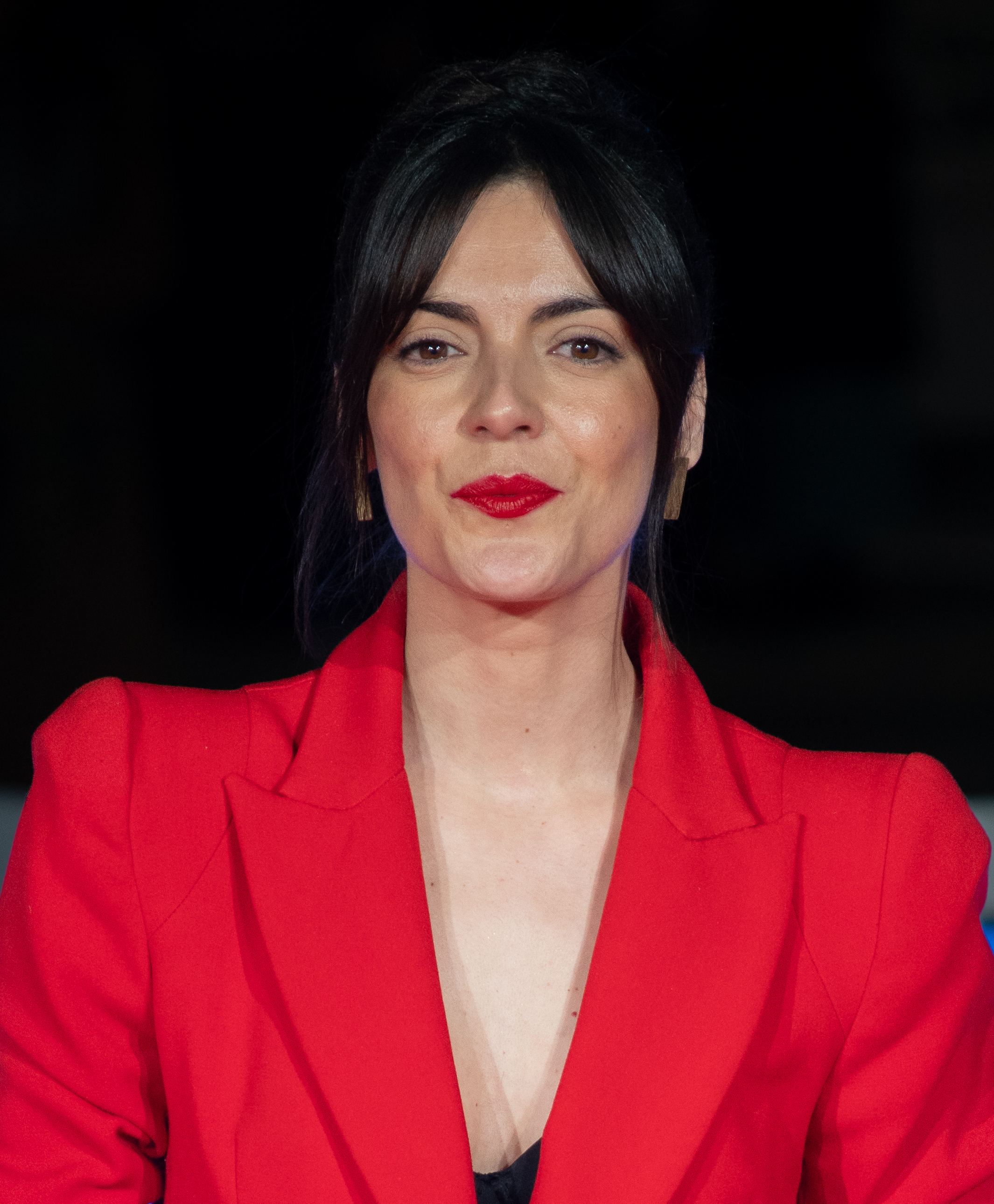
- Arjona in 2024
- Born: 30 November 1983 (age 42); Seville, Andalusia, Spain
- Occupation: Actress

Beatriz Arjona (born 30 November 1983) is a Spanish actress.

== Life and career ==
Arjona was born on 30 November 1983 in Seville. She studied dramatic art at Seville's Escuela Superior de Arte Dramático (ESAD). She developed an early career on stage under Jota Linares, Abril Zamora, and Oriol Tarrasón, featuring in plays such as A quién te llevarías a una isla desierta and Las dependientas. She also started a screen career, featuring in Casting (2012) for which the female cast won a collective Best Supporting Actress award at the Málaga Film Festival. She went on to star in the Mexican film Me quedo contigo, presented at the 2014 Morelia Film Festival. She portrayed Dulce in Cable Girls's season 4. Other television roles include credits in El ministerio del tiempo, Estoy vivo, Libertad, and Operación Barrio Inglés. She also portrayed Lucía Setién / Helena Garrido in season ten of the soap opera Amar es para siempre.

For her performance in the film The Party's Over (2024) as a domestic servant, she won Best Leading Actress at the 4th Carmen Awards. She was also nominated for Best Supporting Actress for Alone in the Night (2024). In 2025, she featured in the role of Alma in the Italian box-office hit Buen Camino.
