= Javier Ocaña =

Spanish film critic (born 1971)

Ocaña in 2022

Javier Ocaña (born 1971) is a Spanish film critic.

== Life and career ==
Ocaña was born in 1971 in Martos, province of Jaén. He earned a licentiate degree in law from the University of Granada and a master's degree in journalism from the Autonomous University of Madrid. He began working as a film critic for El País in 2003. He also published in Cinemanía, Actúa, and Gentleman. He is also a recurring collaborator in radio program Hoy por hoy and television show Historia de nuestro cine. He won the CEC Medal to the literary and journalistic merit in 2022.

== Works ==
- — (2003). La vida a través del cine. Punto de Lectura.
- — (2021). De Blancanieves a Kurosawa: La aventura de ver cine con los hijos. Barcelona: Península.
