= Institute of Cinematography and Audiovisual Arts =

Spanish government agency

- Instituto de la Cinematografía y de las Artes Audiovisuales

Agency overview
- Formed: 1 January 1985; 41 years ago
- Preceding agency: Directorate-General for Cinematography (1946–1985)
- Type: Autonomous agency
- Headquarters: Casa de las Siete Chimeneas, Plaza del Rey, 1, Madrid, Spain
- Annual budget: €185.9 million, 2023
- Agency executive: Ignacio Camós Victoria (since 2023), Director-General
- Parent ministry: Ministry of Culture
- Child agency: Filmoteca Española

The Institute of Cinematography and Audiovisual Arts (Spanish: Instituto de la Cinematografía y de las Artes Audiovisuales; ICAA) is a Spanish government agency, charged with the planning of policies to support the film industry and audiovisual production. It depends on the Ministry of Culture. It is a member of the European Film Promotion (EFP) network on behalf of Spain.

== History ==
Through the Law 50/1984 of 30 December 1984, the ICAA was created in 1985. In 1986, Fernando Méndez-Leite replaced Pilar Miró at the helm of the ICAA. Miguel Marías became the director general in 1988, whereas Enrique Balmaseda served as head from 1990 to 1992.

== Role ==
The ICAA manages the subsidies to the film industry provided by the General State Budget. It is charged with ensuring free competition in the audiovisual sector. The institute is also tasked with encouraging cooperation with similar bodies from other countries as well as with cooperating with the regional administrations of the different autonomous communities. It also assumes the function of the "safeguarding and dissemination of Spanish film heritage" by preserving copies of films, music, scripts and posters.
