= Málaga Film Festival =

Annual film festival held in Málaga, Andalusia, Spain

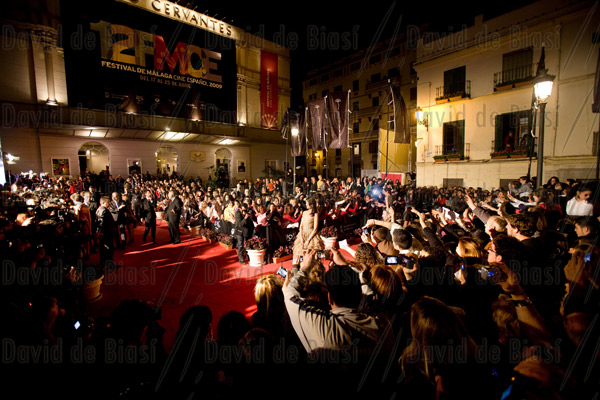
- Red carpet before the Teatro Cervantes during the 2009 edition
- Genre: film festival
- Frequency: Annual
- Locations: Málaga, Andalusia, Spain
- Inaugurated: 1998
- Most recent: 29th Málaga Film Festival (6–15 March 2026)
- Website: www.festivaldemalaga.com

The Málaga Festival, formerly Málaga Spanish Film Festival (FMCE), (Note: The initials are from the Spanish-language name Festival de Málaga Cine Español.) is an annual film festival held in Málaga, Andalusia, Spain. The festival was established to promote Spanish cinema and help disseminate information about Spanish films. Since 2017, it features an additional focus on Ibero-American films.

In 2024, it became a FIAPF-accredited film festival, as a competitive film festival specialized in Spanish-language cinema.

== History ==
The first edition ran from 29 May to 6 June 1998. The guest of honor was Fernando Fernán Gómez, and the retrospective was dedicated to Montxo Armendariz. The festival's first 11 editions were directed by Salomón Castiel. In 2009, Castiel was replaced by Carmelo Romero, who helmed the festival until 2012.

Originally the festival was held anytime from March through June. The festival has numerous screenings of the most important Spanish film releases for the previous year, including documentaries and short films.

In 2017, the festival developed an additional scope by opening to Ibero-American productions, resulting into an enlarged official selection. In 2018, director Juan Antonio Vigar made a statement about the challenge of setting March as the definitive date for the festival from the 2019 edition onward. The COVID-19 pandemic nonetheless came to disrupt the schedule of the 2020 and 2021 editions.

== Projects ==
=== MAFIZ ===
The Malaga Festival Industry Zone (MAFIZ) includes a work-in-progress pitching platform, a co-production market, the Spanish Screenings market, as well as talks and panels targeting business opportunities and financial support for new projects.

In 2023, MAFIZ was visited by 1897 attendees from 64 countries.

=== MAFF ===
Malaga Festival Fund & Co Production Event was created to strengthen the connections between Latin American and European feature film producers. MAFF was co-created with the Malaga City Council and is supported by ICAA, CAACI (Conference of Ibero-American Audiovisual and Cinematographic Authorities), Ibermedia, FIPCA (Ibero-American Federation of Film and Audiovisual Producers) and EAVE (European Audiovisual Entrepreneurs).

In 2024, MAFF will celebrate its 7th edition.

== Awards ==
The festival concedes competitive awards as well as honorary awards. The main prize is the 'Golden Biznaga' for best picture (awarded to the Best Spanish picture, and also, in a different category, to the Best Ibero-American picture). Other awardees, such as "Critic's Choice" and "Best Direction" receive Silver Biznagas. In addition the festival hosts panel discussions and round-tables on topics of current interest in Spanish cinema.

=== Golden Biznaga for Best Spanish Film ===
The Golden Biznaga for Best Spanish Picture was awarded as follows:

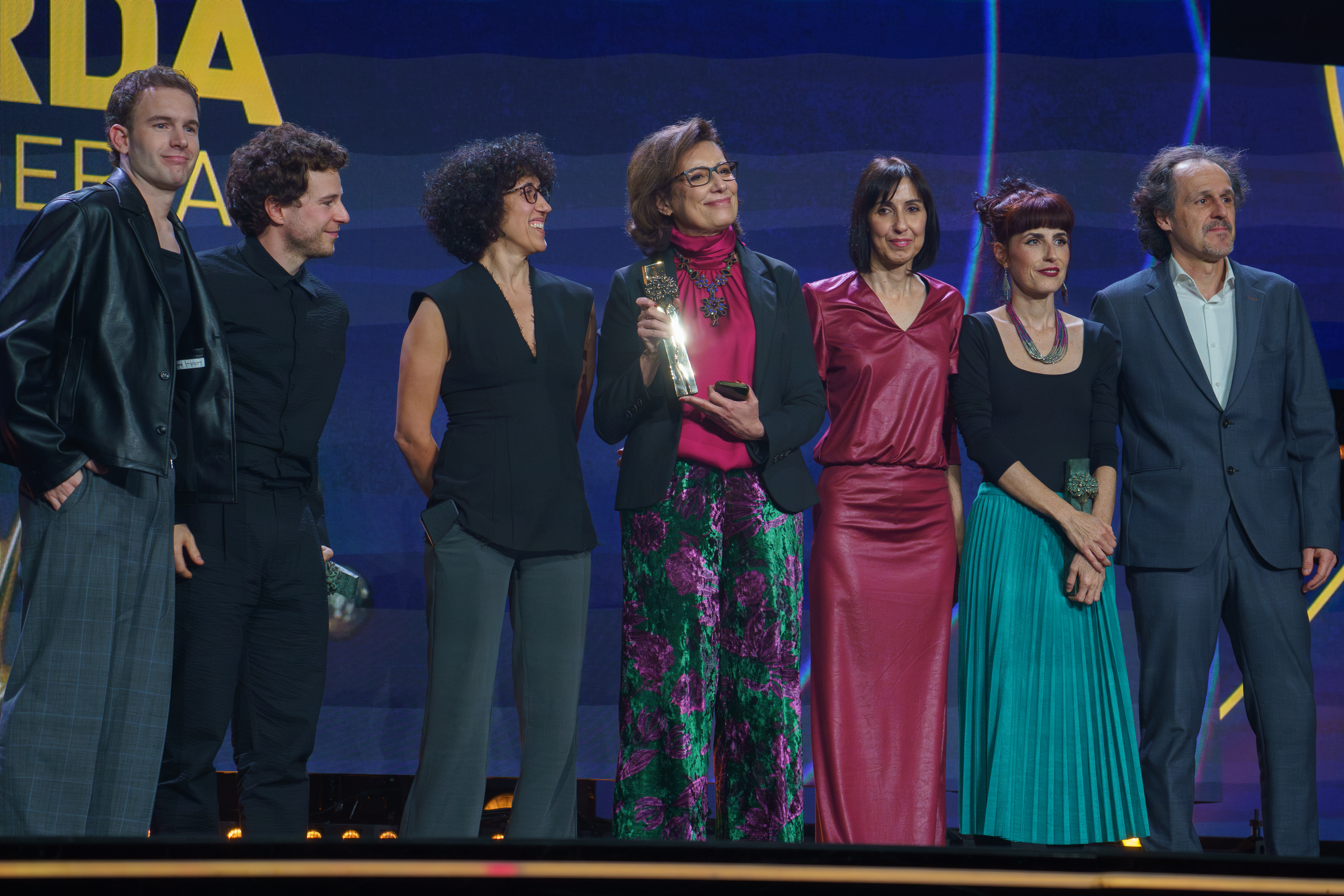
Deaf crew and cast members at the 2025 edition

- 1998 — The First Night of My Life (La primera noche de mi vida) by Miguel Albaladejo
- 1999 — Fading Memories (Las huellas borradas), by Enrique Gabriel
- 2000 — Compassionate Sex (Sexo por compasión), by Laura Mañá
- 2001 — No Shame (Sin vergüenza), by Joaquín Oristrell
- 2002 — The Other Side of the Bed (El otro lado de la cama), by Emilio Martínez Lázaro
- 2003 — Torremolinos 73, by Pablo Berger
- 2004 — Héctor, by Gracia Querejeta
- 2005 — Tapas, by Juan Cruz and José Corbacho
- 2006 — Rough Winds (Los aires difíciles), by Gerardo Herrero
- 2007 — Under the Stars (Bajo las estrellas), by Félix Viscarret
- 2008 — Before the Fall (Tres días), by Francisco Javier Gutiérrez
- 2009 — The Shame (La vergüenza), by David Planell
- 2010 — Rage (Rabia), by Sebastián Cordero
- 2011 — Five Square Meters (Cinco metros cuadrados), by Max Lemcke
- 2012 — The Wild Ones (Els nens salvatges), by Patricia Ferreira
- 2013 — 15 Years and One Day (15 años y un día), by Gracia Querejeta
- 2014 — 10,000 km, by Carlos Marqués-Marcet
- 2015 — Nothing in Return (A cambio de nada), by Daniel Guzmán
- 2016 — Callback, directed by Carles Torras
- 2017 — Summer 1993 (Estiu 1993), by Carla Simón
- 2018 — Distances (Les distàncies), by Elena Trapé
- 2019 — The Days to Come (Els dies que vindran), by Carlos Marqués-Marcet
- 2020 — Schoolgirls (Las niñas), by Pilar Palomero.
- 2021 — The Belly of the Sea (El ventre del mar), by Agustí Villaronga
- 2022 — Lullaby (Cinco lobitos), by Alauda Ruiz de Azúa
- 2023 — 20,000 Species of Bees (20.000 especies de abejas), by Estibaliz Urresola Solaguren
- 2024 — Saturn Return (Segundo premio), by Isaki Lacuesta and Pol Rodríguez
- 2025 — Deaf (Sorda) by Eva Libertad
- 2026 — I Won't Die for Love (Yo no moriré de amor) by Marta Matute

=== Golden Biznaga for Best Ibero-American Film ===
The Golden Biznaga for Best Ibero-American Film was awarded as follows:

- 2017 — Last Days in Havana (Últimos días en La Habana), by Fernando Pérez (Cuba)
- 2018 — Loveling (Benzinho), by Gustavo Pizzi (Brazil)
- 2019 — The Good Girls (Las niñas bien) by Alejandra Márquez Abella (Mexico)
- 2020 — Summer White (Blanco de verano) by Rodrigo Ruiz Patterson (Mexico)
- 2021 — Karnawal, by Juan Pablo Félix (Argentina, Bolivia, Chile)
- 2022 — Utama, by Alejandro Loayza Grisi (Bolivia)
- 2023 — Sister & Sister (Las hijas), by Kattia G. Zúñiga (Panama, Chile)
- 2024 — Radical, by Christopher Zalla (Mexico)
- 2025 — The Dog Thief (El ladrón de perros), by Vinko Tomičić Salinas
- 2026 — The Garden We Dreamed (El jardín que soñamos) by Joaquín del Paso

=== Silver Biznaga for Best Director - Ibero-American Film ===
The Golden Biznaga for Best Ibero-American Film was awarded as follows:

- 2014 — Behavior (film) (Conducta), by Ernesto Daranas (Cuba)
- 2011 — Memories of Overdevelopment (Memorias del Desarrollo), Miguel Coyula (Cuba)

=== Special Jury Prize ===
The Silver Biznaga for Special Jury Prize was awarded as follows:

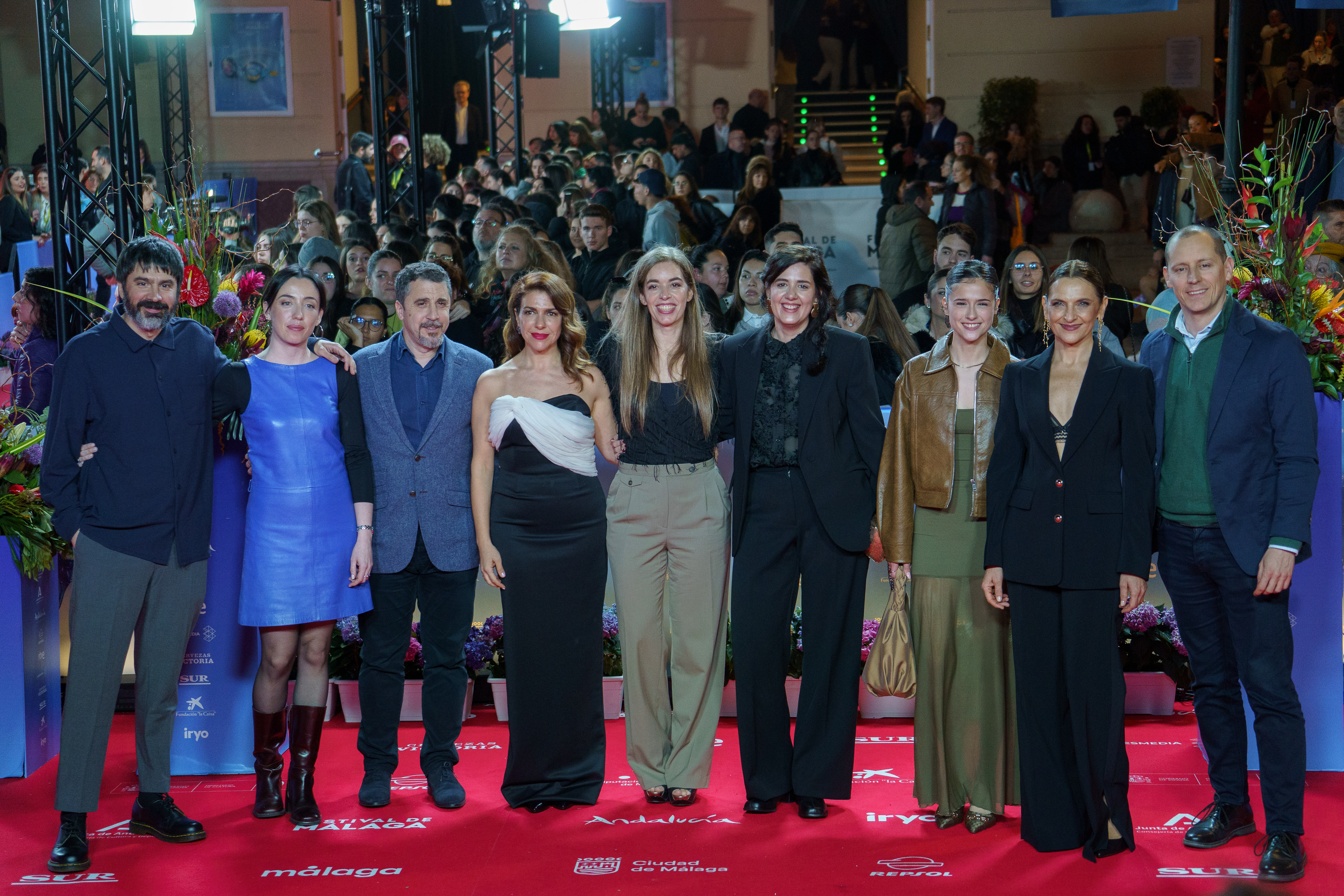
The Exiles crew and cast members attending the 2025 edition

- 2000 — Leo, by José Luis Borau
- 2001 — Nómadas, by Gonzalo López-Gallego
- 2002 — Smoking Room, by Julio D. Wallovits and Roger Gual
- 2003 — Stormy Weather, (Tiempo de tormenta) by Pedro Olea
- 2004 — León and Olvido (León y Olvido), by Xavier Bermúdez
- 2005 — Ants in the Mouth (Hormigas en la boca), by Mariano Barroso
- 2006 — Dark Blue Almost Black (AzulOscuroCasiNegro), by Daniel Sánchez Arévalo
- 2007 — Thieves (Ladrones), by Jaime Marqués
- 2008 — Todos estamos invitados, by Manuel Gutiérrez Aragón
- 2009 — Amores locos, by Beda Docampo Feijóo
- 2010 — Bon Appétit, by David Pinillos
- 2011 — Carmina or Blow Up (Carmina o revienta), by Paco León
- 2012 — Catalunya über alles!, by Ramon Térmens
- 2013 — Ayer no termina nunca, by Isabel Coixet
- 2014 — They Are All Dead (Todos están muertos), by Beatriz Sanchís
- 2015 — Los exiliados románticos, by Jonás Trueba
- 2016 — The Next Skin (La propera pell), by Isaki Lacuesta and Isa Campo
- 2017 — Can't Say Goodbye (No sé decir adiós), by Lino Escalera
- 2018 — Almost 40 (Casi 40), by David Trueba and The Queen of Fear (La reina del miedo), by Valeria Bertuccelli and Fabiana Tiscornia
- 2019 — This Is Not Berlin (Esto no es Berlín), by Hari Sama
- 2020 — Rosa's Wedding (La boda de Rosa), by Icíar Bollaín
- 2021 — Destello bravío, by Ainhoa Rodríguez
- 2022 — My Emptiness and I (Mi vacío y yo), by Adrián Silvestre
- 2023 — Under Therapy (Bajo terapia), by Gerardo Herrero
- 2024 — Little Loves, by Celia Rico
- 2025 — The Exiles, by Belén Funes
- 2026 — Iván & Hadoum by Ian de la Rosa

=== Best Director ===
The Silver Biznaga for Best Director was awarded as follows:

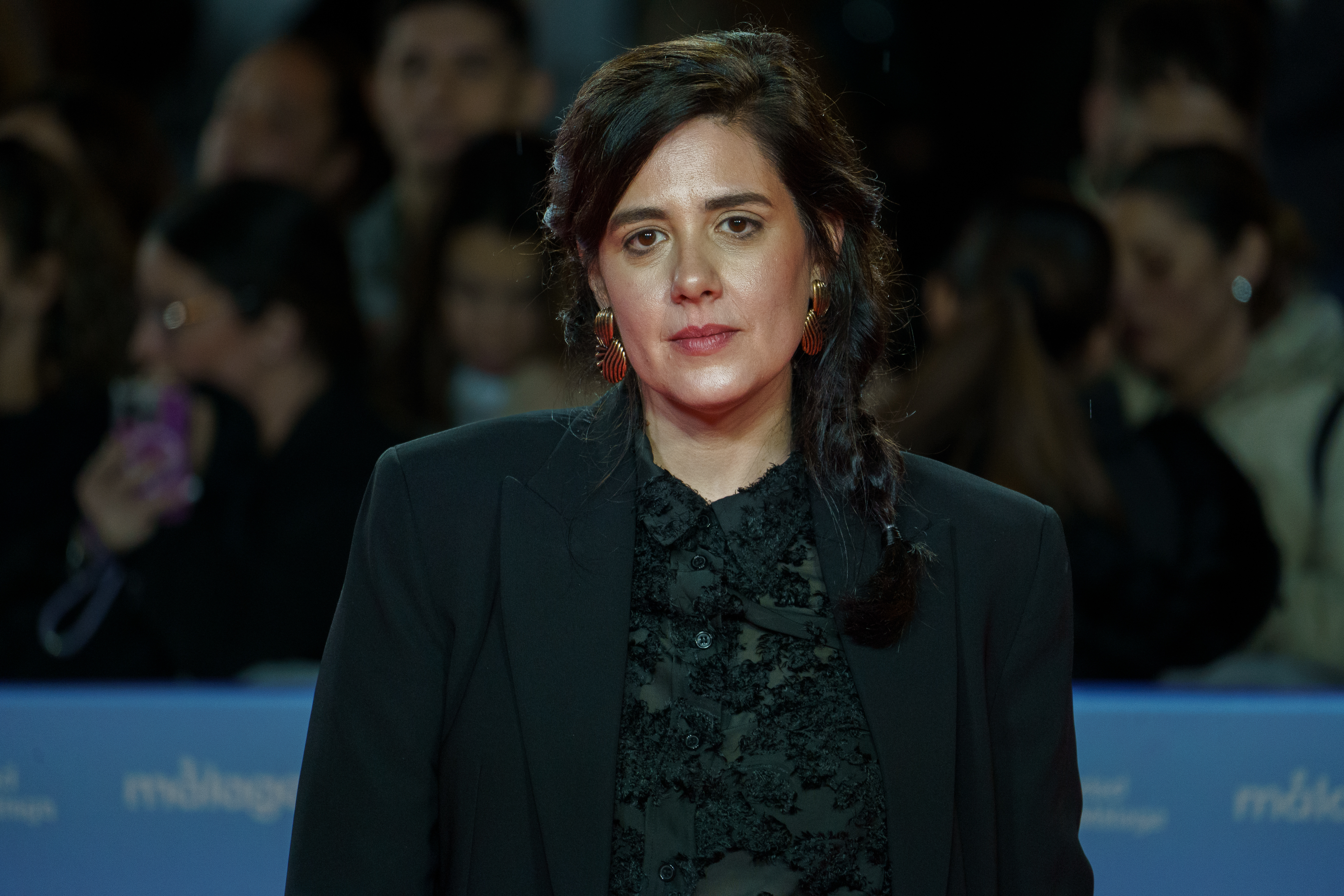
Belén Funes attending the 2025 edition

- 1999 — Enrique Gabriel for Fading Memories (Las huellas borradas)
- 2000 — Cesc Gay for Nico and Dani (Krámpack)
- 2001 — Mónica Laguna for Juego de luna
- 2002 — Emilio Martínez Lázaro for The Other Side of the Bed (El otro lado de la cama)
- 2003 — Pablo Berger for Torremolinos 73
- 2004 — Vicente Peñarrocha for Body Confusion (Fuera del cuerpo)
- 2005 — Gerardo Herrero for Heroine (Heroína)
- 2006 — David Trueba for Welcome Home (Bienvenido a Casa)
- 2007 — Félix Viscarret for Under the Stars (Bajo las estrellas)
- 2008 — Sílvia Munt for Pretextes
- 2009 — Mar Coll for Three Days With the Family (Tres dies amb la família)
- 2010 — Juana Macías for Plans for Tomorrow (Planes para mañana)
- 2011 — Tom Fernández for ¿Para qué sirve un oso?
- 2012 — Imanol Uribe for Orange Honey (Miel de naranjas)
- 2013 — Rodrigo Sorogoyen for Stockholm ( )
- 2014 — Carlos Marqués-Marcet for 10,000 km
- 2015 — Daniel Guzmán for Nothing in Return (A cambio de nada)
- 2016 — Isa Campo and Isaki Lacuesta for The Next Skin (La propera pell)
- 2017 — Víctor Gaviria for The Animal's Wife (La mujer del animal)
- 2018 — Elena Trapé for Distances (Les distàncies)
- 2019 — Carlos Marqués-Marcet for The Days to Come (Els dies que vindran)
- 2020 — Arturo Ripstein for Devil Between the Legs (El diablo entre las piernas)
- 2021 — Agustí Villaronga for The Belly of the Sea (El ventre del mar)
- 2022 — Alejandro Loayza Grisi for Utama
- 2023 — Matías Bize for The Punishment (El castigo)
- 2024 — Isaki Lacuesta, Pol Rodríguez for Saturn Return (Segundo premio)
- 2025 — Belén Funes for The Exiles (Los Tortuga)

=== Best Actor ===
The Silver Biznaga for Best Actor was awarded as follows:

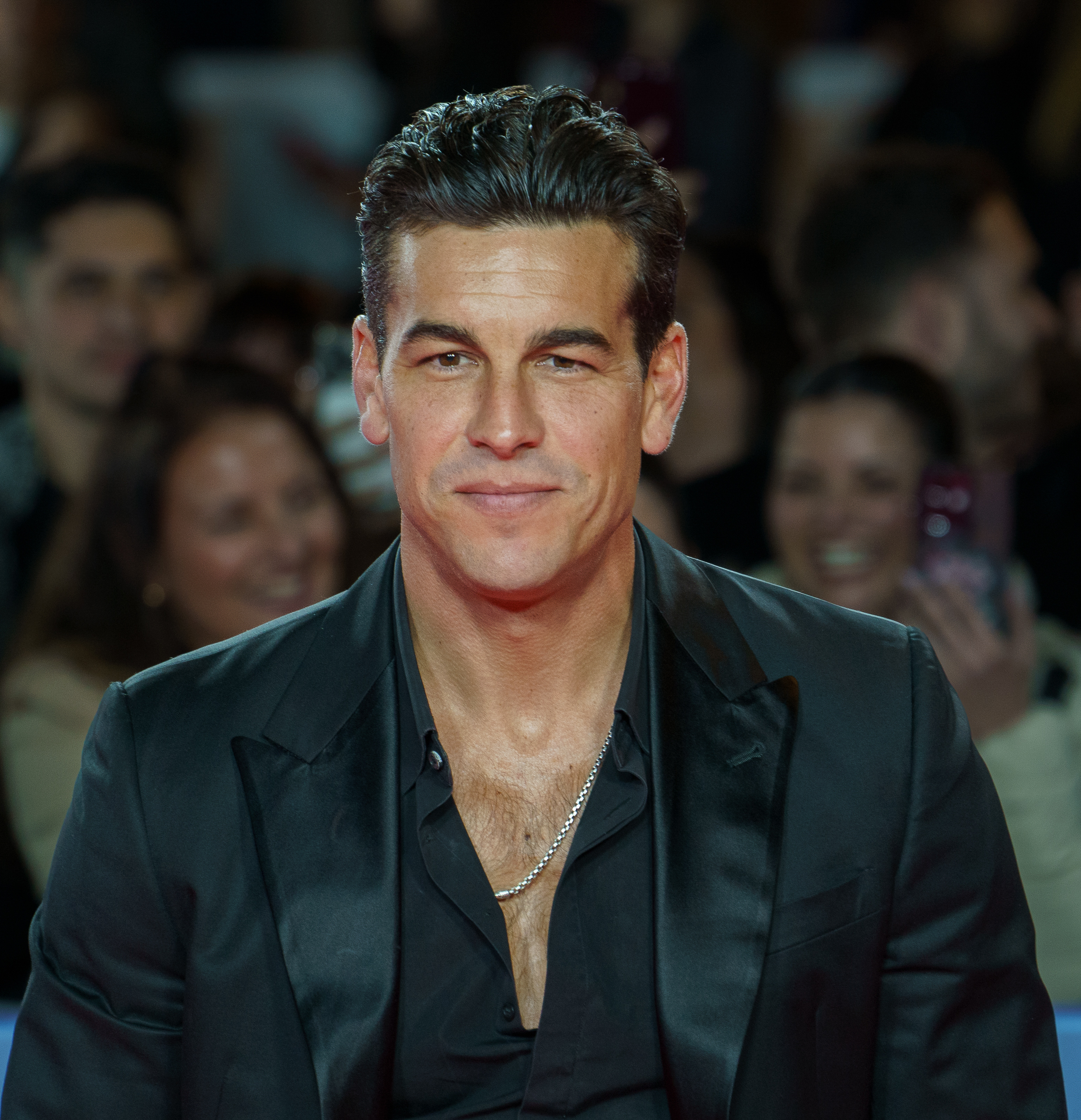
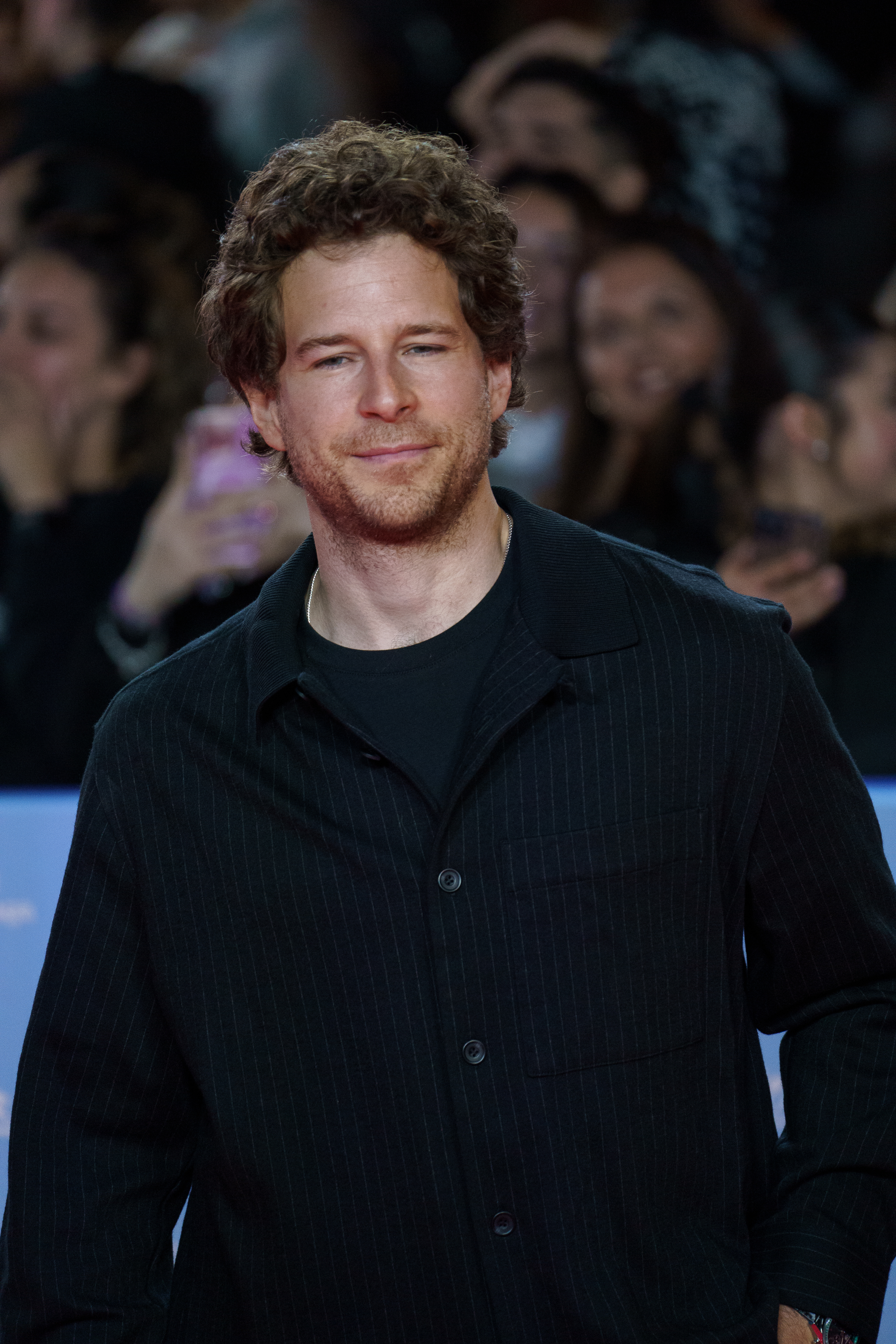
Mario Casas (left) and Álvaro Cervantes (right) attending the 2025 edition
- 1998 — Emilio Gutiérrez Caba for The First Night of My Life (La primera noche de mi vida)
- 1999 — Sergi López for Lisbon (Lisboa)
- 2000 — Juan Luis Galiardo for Adiós con el corazón
- 2001 — Biel Durán for No Pain, No Gain (Más pena que gloria)
- 2002 — Eduard Fernández, Antonio Dechent, Chete Lera, Juan Diego and Francesc Garrido for Smoking Room
- 2003 — Javier Cámara for Torremolinos 73
- 2004 — Pablo Carbonell for Tuna and Chocolate (Atún y chocolate)
- 2005 — Eduard Fernández for Ants in the Mouth (Hormigas en la boca)
- 2006 — Juan Diego for El triunfo and Remake
- 2007 — Alberto San Juan for Under the Stars (Bajo las estrellas)
- 2008 — Javier Cámara for Chef's Special (Fuera de carta)
- 2009 — Eduard Fernández for Three Days With the Family (Tres dies amb la família)
- 2010 — Unax Ugalde for Bon Appétit
- 2011 — Fernando Tejero for Five Square Meters (Cinco metros cuadrados)
- 2012 — Antonio Dechent for Cold Call (A puerta fría)
- 2013 — Mario Casas for The Mule (La mula)
- 2014 — Juan Diego for Nightfall in India (Anochece en la India)
- 2015 — Ernesto Alterio for Easy Sex, Sad Movies (Sexo fácil, películas tristes)
- 2016 — Martin Bacigalupo for Callback
- 2017 — Leonardo Sbaraglia for The Lost Brother (El otro hermano)
- 2018 — Javier Rey for Not the End (Sin fin)
- 2019 — Oscar Martínez for Me, Myself and My Dead Wife (Yo, mi mujer y mi mujer muerta)
- 2020 — Alberto Ammann and Pablo Echarri for El silencio del cazador
- 2021 — Roger Casamajor for The Belly of the Sea (El ventre del mar)
- 2022 — Leonardo Sbaraglia for Wandering Heart
- 2023 — Alberto Ammann for Upon Entry (La llegada)
- 2024 — Luis Zahera for Birds Flying East and Joaquín Furriel for Rest in Peace (Descansar en paz)
- 2025 — Mario Casas for Away (Molt lluny) and Álvaro Cervantes for Deaf (Sorda)

=== Best Actress ===
The Silver Biznaga for Best Actress was awarded as follows:

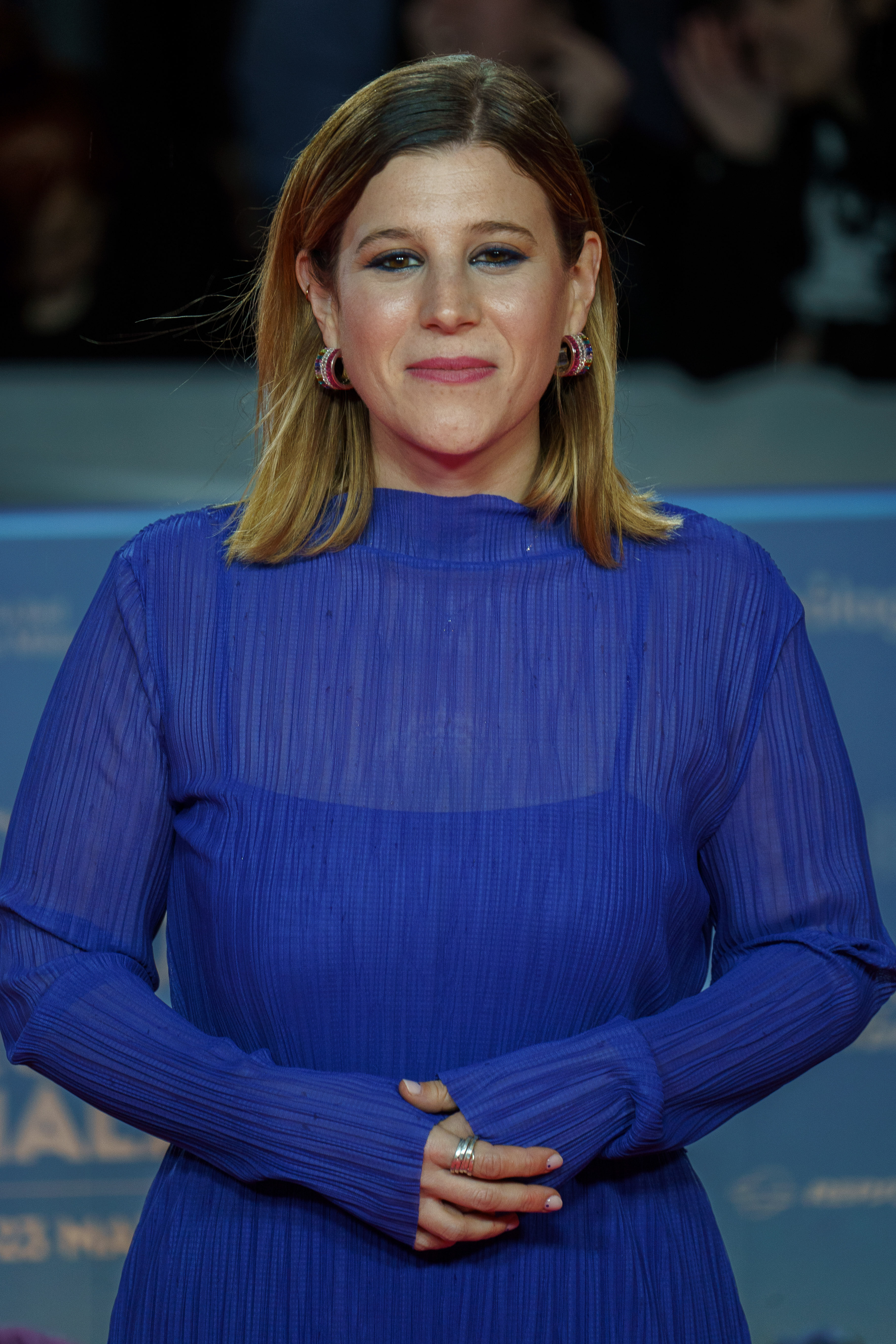
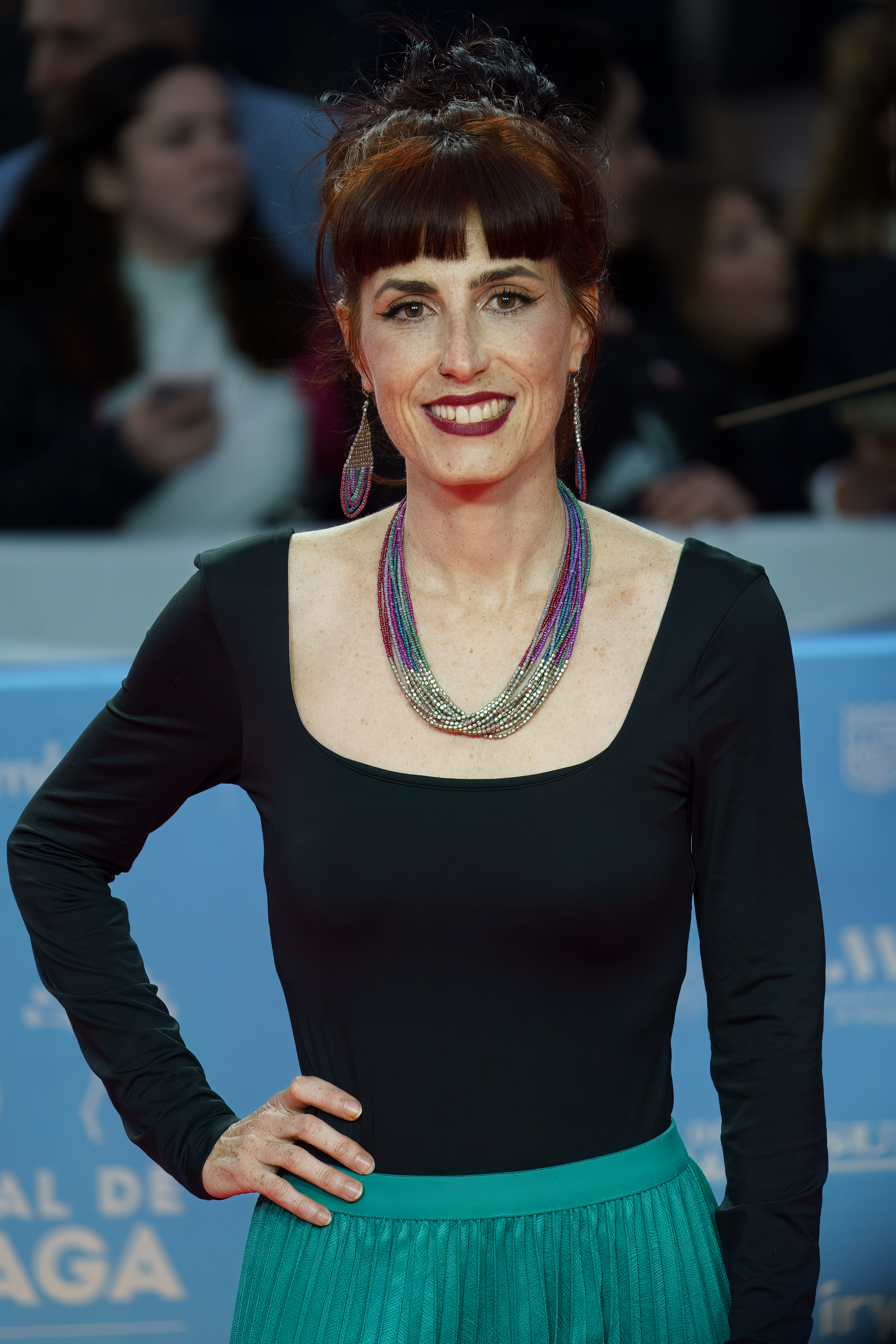
Ángela Cervantes (left) and Miriam Garlo (right) attending the 2025 edition
- 1998 — Kiti Manver for A Perfect Couple (Una pareja perfecta)
- 1999 — Asunción Balaguer for Fading Memories (Las huellas borradas)
- 2001 — Verónica Forqué for No Shame (Sin vergüenza)
- 2002 — Claudia Rojas for La novia de Lázaro
- 2003 — Candela Peña for Torremolinos 73
- 2004 — Adriana Ozores for Héctor
- 2005 — Elvira Mínguez for Tapas
- 2006 — Silvia Abascal for The Idiot Maiden (La dama boba)
- 2007 — Elvira Mínguez for Modesty (Pudor)
- 2008 — Ana Fernández for Bienvenido a Farewell-Gutmann
- 2009 — Nausicaa Bonnín for Three Days With the Family (Tres dies amb la família)
- 2010 — Marisa Paredes for El Dios de madera
- 2011 — Begoña Maestre for Arriya
- 2012 — Carmina Barrios for Carmina or Blow Up (Carmina o revienta)
- 2013 — Candela Peña for Ayer no termina nunca and Aura Garrido for Stockholm
- 2014 — Natalia Tena for 10,000 km and Elena Anaya for Todos están muertos
- 2015 — Natalia de Molina for Food and Shelter (Techo y comida)
- 2016 — Emma Suárez for The Next Skin (La propera pell)
- 2017 — Nathalie Poza for Can't Say Goodbye (No sé decir adiós)
- 2018 — Alexandra Jiménez for Distances (Les distàncies) and Valeria Bertuccelli for The Queen of Fear (La reina del miedo)
- 2019 — María Rodríguez Soto for The Days to Come (Els dies que vindran)
- 2020 — Kiti Manver for One Careful Owner (El inconveniente) and Regina Casé for Three Summers (Três Verões)
- 2021 — Tamara Casellas for Ama
- 2022 — Laia Costa and Susi Sánchez for Lullaby (Cinco lobitos)
- 2023 — María Vázquez for Matria
- 2025 — Ángela Cervantes for Fury (La furia) and Miriam Garlo for Deaf (Sorda)

=== Best Supporting Actor ===
The Silver Biznaga for Best Supporting Actor was awarded as follows:

- 2006 — Roberto Sanmartín for The Idiot Maiden (La dama boba)
- 2007 — Nancho Novo for Tuya siempre
- 2008 — Óscar Jaenada for Todos estamos invitados
- 2009 — Sancho Gracia for 7 pasos y medio
- 2010 — Alex Brendemühl for Rage (Rabia)
- 2011 — Jorge Bosch for Five Square Meters (Cinco metros cuadrados)
- 2012 — Àlex Monner for The Wild Ones (Els nens salvatges) and Álvaro Cervantes for Angels of Sex (El sexo de los ángeles)
- 2013 — Male ensemble of Casting
- 2014 — Héctor Medina and Salva Reina for 321 Days in Michigan (321 días en Míchigan)
- 2015 — Antonio Bachiller for Nothing in Return (A cambio de nada)
- 2016 — Oscar Martínez for Kóblic
- 2017 — Juan Diego for Can't Say Goodbye (No sé decir adiós)
- 2018 — Vladimir Cruz for Los buenos demonios
- 2019 — Quim Gutiérrez for Litus
- 2020 — Fabián Corres for Summer White (Blanco de verano)
- 2021 — Alfredo Castro for Karnawal
- 2022 — Nicolás Poblete for Mensajes privados
- 2023 — Jorge Marrale for Let the Dance Begin (Empieza el baile)
- 2024 — Gabriel Goity for Rest in Peace (Descansar en paz)
- 2025 — Àlex Monner for Fury (La furia)

=== Best Supporting Actress ===
The Silver Biznaga for Best Supporting Actress was awarded as follows:

- 2001 — Mariví Bilbao for La primera vez
- 2006 — Macarena Gómez for The Idiot Maiden (La dama boba)
- 2007 — Verónica Echegui for The Lesser Evil El menor de los males
- 2008 — Mariana Cordero for Before the Fall (3 días)
- 2009 — Toni Acosta for 7 minutos
- 2010 — Aura Garrido for Plans for Tomorrow (Planes para mañana)
- 2011 — Geraldine Chaplin for ¿Para qué sirve un oso?
- 2012 — Aina Clotet for The Wild Ones (Els nens salvatges)
- 2013 — Female ensemble of Casting
- 2014 — Yolanda Ramos for Carmina and Amen (Carmina y amén)
- 2015 — Elsa Olivero for The Debt (La deuda)
- 2016 — Silvia Maya for Julie
- 2017 — Gabriela Ramos for Last Days in Havana (Últimos días en La Habana)
- 2018 — Carmen Flores for Mi querida cofradía
- 2019 — Carolina Ramírez for Wandering Girl (Niña Errante) and Maggie Civantos for The Burning (Antes de la quema)
- 2020 — Nathalie Poza for Rosa's Wedding (La boda de Rosa)
- 2021 — María Romanillos for The Consequences (Las consecuencias)
- 2022 — Debora Maria da Silva for A Mãe
- 2023 — Patricia López Arnaiz for 20,000 Species of Bees (20.000 especies de abejas)
- 2024 — Adriana Ozores for Little Loves (Los pequeños amores)
- 2025 — María Elena Pérez for Dogs (Perros)
- 2026 — María Magdalena Sanizo for The Condor Daughter (La Hija Cóndor)

=== Best Screenplay ===
The Silver Biznaga for Best Screenplay was awarded as follows:

- 2001 — Joaquín Oristrell, Dominic Harari, Teresa Pelegrí, and Cristina Rota for No Shame (Sin verguënza)
- 2005 — Ángeles González-Sinde for Heroine (Heroína)
- 2006 — Daniel Sánchez Arévalo for Dark Blue Almost Black (AzulOscuroCasiNegro)
- 2007 — Antonio Hernández and Antonio Galeano for The Lesser Evil El menor de los males
- 2008 — Jaime de Armiñán and Eduardo de Armiñán for 14, Fabian Road
- 2009 — David Planell for The Shame (La vergüenza)
- 2010 — David Pinillos, Juan Carlos Rubio and Paco Cabezas for Bon Appétit
- 2011 — Daniel Remón and Pablo Remón for Five Square Meters (Cinco metros cuadrados)
- 2012 — Patricia Ferreira and Virginia Yagüe for The Wild Ones (Els nens salvatges)
- 2013 — Gracia Querejeta and Antonio Santos Mercero for 15 Years and One Day (15 años y un día)
- 2014 — Paco León for Carmina and Amen (Carmina y amén)
- 2015 — Barney Elliot for The Debt (La deuda)
- 2016 — Carles Torras and Martín Bacigalupo for Callback
- 2017 — Pablo Remón and Lino Escalera for Can't Say Goodbye (No sé decir adiós)
- 2018 — Daniel Díaz Torres and Alejandro Hernández for Los buenos demonios
- 2019 — Alejandra Márquez Abella for The Good Girls (Las niñas bien)
- 2020 — Rodrigo Ruiz Patterson and Raúl Sebastián Quintanilla for Summer White (Blanco de verano)
- 2021 — Agustí Villaronga and Alessandro Baricco for The Belly of the Sea (El ventre del mar)
- 2022 — Aladua Ruiz de Azúa for Lullaby (Cinco lobitos)
- 2023 — Miguel Ibáñez and Elena Trapé for The Enchanted (Els encantats)
- 2024 — Álex Montoya and Joana M. Ortueta for La casa

=== Best Original Score ===
The Silver Biznaga for Best Original Score was awarded as follows:

- 2001 — Pascual Comelade and José Manuel Pagán for La isla del holandés
- 2005 — Najwa Nimri and Pascal Gaigne for 20 Centimeters (20 centímetros)
- 2006 — Johnny Tarradellas for El triunfo
- 2007 — José Reinoso and Horacio Fumero for Tuya siempre
- 2008 — Mikel Salas for Bienvenido a Farewell-Gutmann
- 2009 — Joan Saura for 7 pasos y medio
- 2010 — Juanjo Javierre for To Hell with the Ugly (Que se mueran los feos)
- 2011 — Bingen Mendizábal for Arriya
- 2012 — Aziza Brahim for Wilaya
- 2013 — Pablo Salinas for 15 Years and One Day (15 años y un día)
- 2014 — Juan Manuel del Saso, Juan Pastor and Aaron Rux for Todos están muertos
- 2015 — Tulsa for Los exiliados románticos
- 2016 — Silvia Pérez Cruz for At Your Doorstep (Cerca de tu casa)
- 2017 — Pascal Gaigne for Getaway Plan (Plan de fuga)
- 2018 — Edesio Alejandro for Los buenos demonios
- 2019 — Arturo Cardelús for Buñuel in the Labyrinth of the Turtles (Buñuel en el laberinto de las tortugas)
- 2020 — Pascal Gaigne for Malpaso
- 2021 — Marcús J.G.R. for The Belly of the Sea (El ventre del mar)
- 2022 — Cergio Prudencio for Utama
- 2023 — Pablo Mondragón for Rebelión
- 2024 — Fernando Velázquez for La casa
- 2025 — Filipe Raposo for The Remnants of You (Lo que queda de ti)
- 2026 — Cergio Prudencio, Marcelo Guerrero for The Condor Daughter (La Hija Cóndor)

=== Best Cinematography ===
The Silver Biznaga for Best Cinematography was awarded as follows:

- 2001 — José David Montero for Nómadas
- 2004 — Javier Salmones for Romasanta
- 2005 — Kiko de la Rica for El Calentito
- 2006 — Tote Trenas for Crossing the Border (Un franco, 14 pesetas)
- 2007 — David Azcano for The Contestant (Concursante)
- 2008 — David Omedes for Pretextes
- 2009 — Rodrigo Pulpeiro for The Fish Child (El niño pez)
- 2010 — Enrique Chediak for Rage (Rabia)
- 2011 — Gaizka Bourgevad for Arriya
- 2012 — Sergi Gallardo for Angels of Sex (El sexo de los ángeles)
- 2013 — Jordi Azategui for Ayer no termina nunca
- 2014 — Nicolas Balduc for Aloft (No llores, vuela)
- 2015 — Marc Gómez del Moral for Requirements to Be a Normal Person (Requisitos para ser una persona normal)
- 2016 — Rodrigo Pulpeiro for Kóblic and Carles Gusi for Quatretondeta
- 2017 — Walter Carvalho for Redemoinho
- 2018 — Guillermo Nieto for You Shall Not Sleep (No dormirás)
- 2019 — Alfredo Altamirano for This Is Not Berlin (Esto no es Berlín)
- 2020 — Daniela Cajías for Schoolgirls (Las niñas)
- 2021 — Josep María Civit and Blai Tòmas for The Belly of the Sea (El ventre del mar)
- 2022 — Nicolás Wong Díaz for The Gigantes
- 2023 — Serguei Saldívar Tanaka for Red Shoes (Zapatos rojos)
- 2024 — Juan Carlos Martínez for Golán
- 2025 — Alván Prado for Sugar Island

=== Best Editing ===
The Silver Biznaga for Best Editing was awarded as follows:

- 2012 — Koldo Idigoras for Winning Streak (The Pelayos)
- 2013 — Jordi Azategui for Ayer no termina nunca
- 2014 — José Manuel García Moyano for Nightfall in India (Anochece en la India)
- 2015 — David Gallart for Requirements to Be a Normal Person (Requisitos para ser una persona normal)
- 2016 — Domi Parra for The Next Skin (La propera pell)
- 2020 — Paula Rupolo for El silencio del cazador
- 2021 — José Luis Picado for Destello bravío
- 2022 — Rodrigo Saquel for Mensajes privados
- 2023 — Haroldo Borges and Juliano Castro for Saudade fez morada aqui dentro
- 2024 — Javi Frutos for Saturn Return (Segundo premio)
- 2025 — Didac Palou and Tomás López for Fury (La furia)

=== Critics' Award ===
The Silver Biznaga for Critics' Special Award was awarded as follows:

- 2005 — 20 Centimeters (20 centímetros), by Ramón Salazar
- 2006 — Dark Blue Almost Black (AzulOscuroCasiNegro), by Daniel Sánchez Arévalo
- 2007 — The Contestant (Concursante), by Rodrigo Cortés
- 2008 — Cowards (Cobardes), by José Corbacho and Juan Cruz
- 2009 — Friend Zone (Pagafantas), by Borja Cobeaga
- 2010 — La vida empieza hoy, by Laura Mañá
- 2011 — Five Square Meters (Cinco metros cuadrados), by Max Lemcke
- 2012 — Cold Call (A puerta fría), by Xavi Puebla
- 2013 — 15 Years and One Day (15 años y un día) by Gracia Querejeta
- 2014 — 10,000 km, by Carlos Marques-Marcet
- 2015 — Nothing in Return (A cambio de nada), by Daniel Guzmán
- 2016 — The Next Skin (La propera pell), by Isaki Lacuesta and Isa Campo
- 2020 — Three Summers (Três Verões), by Sandra Kogut
- 2021 — The Consequences (Las consecuencias), by Claudia Pinto
- 2023 — Desperté con un sueño, by Pablo Solarz
- 2024 — Nina by Andrea Jaurrieta

=== Audience Award ===
The Silver Biznaga for Audience Award was awarded as follows:

- 2001 — No Turning Back, by Jesús Nebot and Julia Montejo
- 2004 — Things That Make Living Worthwhile (Cosas que hacen que la vida valga la pena), by Manuel Gómez Pereira
- 2005 — Tapas, by Juan Cruz and José Corbacho
- 2006 — Crossing the Border (Un franco, 14 pesetas), by Carlos Iglesias
- 2007 — Love Expresso (Café solo... o con ellas), by Álvaro Díaz Lorenzo
- 2008 — Chef's Special (Fuera de carta), by Nacho García Velilla
- 2009 — Brain Drain (Fuga de cerebros), by Fernando González Molina
- 2010 — Forever Young (Herois), by Pau Freixas
- 2011 — Amigos..., by Marcos Cabotá and Borja Manso
- 2012 — Carmina or Blow Up (Carmina o revienta), by Paco León
- 2013 — Diamantes negros, by Miguel Alcantud
- 2014 — 321 Days in Michigan (321 días en Míchigan), by Enrique García
- 2015 — Food and Shelter (Techo y comida), by Juan Miguel del Castillo
- 2016 — The Night My Mother Killed My Father (La noche que mi madre mató a mi padre), by Inés París
- 2020 — One Careful Owner (El inconveniente), by Bernabé Rico
- 2021 — Girlfriends (Chavalas), by Carol Rodríguez Colás
- 2022 — Lullaby (Cinco lobitos) by Alauda Ruiz de Azúa
- 2023 — Let the Dance Begin (Empieza el baile), by Marina Seresesky
- 2024 — La casa by Álex Montoya

== See also ==
- List of film festivals in Europe
