= Platino Award for Best First Feature Film =

- Awarded for: Best First Feature Film of the Year
- Country: Ibero-America
- Presented by: Entidad de Gestión de Derechos de los Productores Audiovisuales (EGEDA), Federación Iberoamericana de Productores Cinematográficos y Audiovisuales (FIPCA)
- Currently held by: Deaf (2026)
- Website: premiosplatino.com

The Platino Award for Best First Feature Film (Spanish: Premio Platino a la mejor ópera prima de ficción iberoamericana) is one of the Platino Awards, Ibero-America's film awards, presented by the Entidad de Gestión de Derechos de los Productores Audiovisuales (EGEDA) and the Federación Iberoamericana de Productores Cinematográficos y Audiovisuales (FIPCA).

== History ==
The category was first awarded at the 2nd Platino Awards in 2015, with Venezuelan film La distancia más larga, directed by Claudia Pinto Emperador, being the first recipient of the award.

Multiple winners of the award went on to be nominated for the Best Director for their following efforts, these include Jayro Bustamante, Carla Simón, and Lila Avilés. 2016 winner Ixcanul and 2021 winner Schoolgirls were also nominated for Best Ibero-American Film.

In the list below the winner of the award for each year is shown first, followed by the other nominees.

== Awards and nominations ==
=== 2010s ===
Year	English title	Original title	Director	Country
2015 (2nd)	La distancia más larga		Claudia Pinto Emperador	Venezuela
2015 (2nd)	10,000 km		Carlos Marqués-Marcet	Spain
2015 (2nd)	Ciencias naturales		Matías Lucchesi	Argentina
2015 (2nd)	Mateo		María Gamboa	Colombia
2015 (2nd)	Vestido de novia		Marilyn Solaya	Cuba
2016 (3rd)	Ixcanul		Jayro Bustamante	Guatemala
2016 (3rd)	600 Miles	600 millas	Gabriel Ripstein	Mexico
2016 (3rd)	Retribution	El desconocido	Dani de la Torre	Spain
2016 (3rd)	El patrón: radiografía de un crimen		Sebastián Schindel	Argentina
2016 (3rd)	Magallanes		Salvador del Solar	Peru
2017 (4th)	From Afar	Desde Allá	Lorenzo Vigas	Venezuela
2017 (4th)	The Thin Yellow Line	La delgada línea amarilla	Celso R. García	Mexico
2017 (4th)	Rara		Pepa San Martín	Chile
2017 (4th)	The Fury of a Patient Man	Tarde para la ira	Raúl Arévalo	Spain
2017 (4th)	Dark Skull	Viejo Calavera	Kiro Russo	Bolivia
2018 (5th)	Summer 1993	Estiu 1993	Carla Simón	Spain
2018 (5th)	Bad Influence	Mala junta	Claudia Huaiquimilla	Chile
2018 (5th)	On the Roof	El techo	Patricia Ramos	Cuba
2018 (5th)	The Dragon Defense	La defensa del dragón	Natalia Santa	Colombia
2018 (5th)	The Desert Bride	La novia del desierto	Cecilia Atán & Valeria Pivato	Argentina
2018 (5th)	Holy Camp!	La llamada	Javier Ambrossi & Javier Calvo	Spain
2019 (6th)	The Heiresses	Las herederas	Marcelo Martinessi	Paraguay
2019 (6th)	Carmen & Lola	Carmen y Lola	Arantxa Echevarría	Spain
2019 (6th)	Journey to a Mother's Room	Viaje al cuarto de una madre	Celia Rico Clavellino	Spain
2019 (6th)	The Family	La familia	Gustavo Rondón Córdova	Venezuela

=== 2020s ===
Year	English title	Original title	Director	Country
2020 (7th)	The Chambermaid	La camarista	Lila Avilés	Mexico
2020 (7th)	A Thief's Daughter	La hija de un ladrón	Belén Funes	Spain
2020 (7th)	Advantages of Travelling by Train	Ventajas de viajar en tren	Aritz Moreno	Spain
2020 (7th)	The Awakening of the Ants	El despertar de las hormigas	Antonella Sudasassi	Costa Rica
2021 (8th)	Schoolgirls	Las niñas	Pilar Palomero	Spain
2021 (8th)	Song Without a Name	Canción sin nombre	Melina León	Peru
2021 (8th)	Kill Pinochet		Juan Ignacio Sabatini	Chile; Argentina; Spain
2021 (8th)	Killing the Dead	Matar a un muerto	Hugo Giménez	Paraguay
2022 (9th)	Karnawal		Juan Pablo Félix	Argentina
2022 (9th)	Clara Sola		Nathalie Álvarez Mesén	Costa Rica
2022 (9th)	Libertad		Clara Roquet	Spain
2022 (9th)	Identifying Features	Sin señas particulares	Fernanda Valadez	Mexico; Spain
2023 (10th)	1976		Manuela Martelli	Chile; Argentina
2023 (10th)	Lullaby	Cinco lobitos	Alauda Ruiz de Azúa	Spain
2023 (10th)	Daughter of Rage	La hija de todas las rabias	Laura Baumeister	Nicaragua; Mexico; Spain
2023 (10th)	The Pack	La jauría	Andrés Ramírez Pulido	Colombia
2023 (10th)	Utama		Alejandro Loayza Grisi	Bolivia; Uruguay
2024 (11th)	20,000 Species of Bees	20.000 especies de abejas	Estibaliz Urresola Solaguren	Spain
2024 (11th)	Blondi		Dolores Fonzi	Argentina; Spain
2024 (11th)	The Fishbowl	La pecera	Glorimar Marrero Sánchez	Puerto Rico; Spain
2024 (11th)	The Settlers	Los colonos	Felipe Gálvez Haberle	Chile; Argentina
2024 (11th)	Simón		Diego Vicentini	Venezuela
2024 (11th)	I Have Electric Dreams	Tengo sueños eléctricos	Valentina Maurel	Costa Rica
2025 (12th)	The Dog Thief	El ladrón de perros	Vinko Tomičić	Bolivia; Chile; Ecuador; Mexico
2025 (12th)	Alemania		María Zanetti	Argentina; Spain
2025 (12th)	The Blue Star	La estrella azul	Javier Macipe	Argentina; Spain
2025 (12th)	Simon of the Mountain	Simón de la montaña	Federico Luis	Argentina; Chile; Uruguay
2026 (13th)	Deaf	Sorda	Eva Libertad	Spain
2026 (13th)	The Mysterious Gaze of the Flamingo	La misteriosa mirada del flamenco	Diego Céspedes	Chile; Spain
2026 (13th)	Manas		Marianna Brennand	Brazil; Portugal
2026 (13th)	We Shall Not Be Moved	No nos moverán	Pierre Saint-Martin	Mexico

== See also ==
- Goya Award for Best New Director
