= The Sea Beyond =

The Sea Beyond may refer to:

- The Sea Beyond (film), a 2020 Spanish comedy-drama
- The Sea Beyond (TV series), an Italian drama series that premiered in 2020
