= 24th Málaga Film Festival =

2021 film festival

- Official poster by Ramiro Guevara
- Opening film: The Cover
- Closing film: García y García
- Location: Málaga, Spain
- Awards: Golden Biznaga (The Belly of the Sea and Karnawal)
- Festival date: 3–13 June 2021

Málaga Film Festival
- 2022 2020

The 24th Málaga Film Festival was an instance of the Málaga Film Festival that took place from 3 to 13 June 2021 in Málaga, Andalusia, Spain.

== Background ==
In March 2021, the festival presented the official poster for the 24th edition designed by Ramiro Guevara. The official selection included 23 titles; four of them were in non-competitive slots. The opening gala at the Teatro Cervantes was hosted by Sílvia Abril and Toni Acosta and it included musical performances by Miguel Ríos and Black Betty Trio, Mäbu ft. Estíbaliz Uranga, El Niño de Elche, Kiko Veneno, and Sidonie. The Cover screened as the opening film. The closing gala was hosted by Santiago Segura while Manuel García featured as a musical act.

== Jury ==
Main competition

- Nora Navas (president), actress
- Carles Torras, director
- Rafael Cobos, screenwriter
- Valérie Delpierre, producer
- Elena S. Sánchez, journalist

Zonazine

- Enric Albero
- Joe Manjón
- Luz Valdenebro

== Films ==
=== Official selection ===
==== In competition ====
Highlighted title indicates section's best film winner.

English title	Original title	Director(s)	Production countrie(s)
15 Hours	15 horas	Judith Colell	Dominican Republic; Spain
Ama		Júlia de Paz	Spain
Amalgama		Carlos Cuarón	Mexico
Años luz		Joaquín Mauad	Uruguay
The Belly of the Sea	El ventre del mar	Agustí Villaronga	Spain
The Best Families	Las mejores familias	Javier Fuentes León	Peru; Colombia
Carpoolers	Con quién viajas	Martín Cuervo	Spain
La ciudad de las fieras		Henry Rincón	Colombia; Ecuador
Cómo mueren las reinas		Lucas Turturro	Argentina
The Consequences	Las consecuencias	Claudia Pinto	Spain; Belgium; Netherlands
The Cover	El cover	Secun de la Rosa	Spain
A Dead Man Cannot Live	Hombre muerto no sabe vivir	Ezekiel Montes	Spain
Girlfriends	Chavalas	Carol Rodríguez Colás	Spain
The House of Snails	La casa del caracol	Macarena Astorga	Spain; Mexico; Peru
Karnawal		Juan Pablo Félix	Argentina; Bolivia; Brazil; Chile; France; Mexico; Norway
Life Is Life		Dani de la Torre	Spain
Mighty Flash	Destello bravío	Ainhoa Rodríguez	Spain
Ocean Girl	Mulher Oceano	Djin Sganzerla	Brazil
The Replacement	El sustituto	Oscar Aibar	Spain; Belgium

==== Out of competition ====
English title	Original title	Director(s)	Production countrie(s)
García y García		Ana Murugarren	Spain
Historias lamentables		Javier Fesser	Spain
Undercover Wedding Crashers	Operación Camarón	Carlos Therón	Spain
When Brooklyn Met Seville	Sevillanas de Brooklyn	Vicente Villanueva	Spain

=== Zonazine ===
The Zonazine selection featured the following 8 films:

Highlighted title indicates section's best film winner.

English title	Original title	Director(s)	Production countrie(s)
Juana la Lorca		Valeriano López	Spain
Two	Dos	Mar Targarona	Spain
Soledades		Alexis Delgado Búrdalo	Spain
Lucas		Álex Montoya	Spain
Leading Ladies		Ruth Caudeli	Colombia
Los hermosos vencidos		Guillermo Magariños	Mexico; Spain
Samichay, In Search of Happiness	Samichay	Mauricio Franco	Peru; Spain
Las motitos		Inés Barrionuevo, Gabriela Vidal	Argentina

=== Málaga Premiere ===
The following series were programmed to have pre-screenings at the Málaga Premiere section:

English title	Original title	Director(s)	Production countrie(s)
Queer You Are	Maricón perdido	Alejandro Marín	Spain
ANA. all in	Ana Tramel. El juego	Salvador García, Gracia Querejeta	Spain; Germany
Paradise	Paraíso	Fernando González Molina	Spain
Lucía en la telaraña		Tomás Ocaña	Spain

== Awards ==
Some of the main awards conceded at the festival are listed as follows.

=== Official selection ===
Main competition

- Golden Biznaga for Best Spanish Film: The Belly of the Sea
- Golden Biznaga for Best Ibero-American Film: Karnawal
- Silver Biznaga, Special Jury Prize: Mighty Flash
- Silver Biznaga for Best Director: Agustí Villaronga (The Belly of the Sea)
- Silver Biznaga for Best Actress: Tamara Casellas (Ama).
- Silver Biznaga for Best Actor: Roger Casamajor (The Belly of the Sea)
- Silver Biznaga for Best Supporting Actress: María Romanillos (The Consequences)
- Silver Biznaga for Best Supporting Actor: Alfredo Castro (Karnawal)
- Silver Biznaga for Best Screenplay: Agustí Villaronga and Alessandro Baricco (The Belly of the Sea)
- Silver Biznaga for Best Music: Marcús J.G.R. (The Belly of the Sea)
- Silver Biznaga for Best Cinematography: Josep Maria Civit and Blai Tòmas (The Belly of the Sea)
- Silver Biznaga for Best Editing: José Luis Picado (Mighty Flash)

Other

- Silver Biznaga, Critics' Jury Special Prize: The Consequences
- Silver Biznaga, Audience Award for Best Film: Girlfriends.

=== Zonazine ===
- Silver Biznaga for Best Spanish Film: Lucas
- Silver Biznaga for Best Latin American Film: Las motitos
- Silver Biznaga for Best Director: Mauricio Franco (Samichay, In Search of Happiness)
- Silver Biznaga for Best Actress: Carla Gusolfino (Las motitos)
- Silver Biznaga for Best Actor: Jorge Motos (Lucas)
- Special Mention of the Jury: the cast of Leading Ladies

=== Myscellaneous ===
- Feroz Puerta Oscura Award: Ama
- SIGNIS Award: 15 Hours
