= The Major Tones =

2023 Spanish fantasy film

- Promotional release poster
- Spanish: Los tonos mayores
- Directed by: Ingrid Pokropek
- Written by: Ingrid Pokropek
- Produced by: Iván Moscovich; Juan Segundo Alamos; Ingrid Pokropek; Magdalena Schavelzon; Pablo Piedras; Miguel Molina; Adán Aliaga
- Starring: Sofía Clausen; Pablo Seijo
- Cinematography: Ana Roy
- Edited by: Miguel de Zuviría
- Music by: Gabriel Chwojnik
- Production companies: Gong Cine; 36 Caballos; Jaibo Films
- Distributed by: Bendita Film Sales; 39 Escalones Films (Spain)
- Release dates: 7 November 2023 (Mar del Plata International Film Festival); 12 July 2024 (Spain)
- Running time: 101 minutes
- Countries: Argentina; Spain
- Language: Spanish

The Major Tones (Spanish: Los tonos mayores) is a 2023 Spanish-language fantasy mystery film written and directed by Ingrid Pokropek in her feature directorial debut. Starring Sofía Clausen in her screen acting debut, the film tells the story of fourteen-year-old Ana, who discovers that the metal plate she has in her arm from an accident she suffered as a child is now receiving a strange message in Morse code.

An Argentina and Spain co-production, it was selected in the Generation Kplus section at the 74th Berlin International Film Festival, where it had its International premiere on 17 February and compete for Crystal Bear for the Best Film.

== Synopsis ==
The film is a fantastic tale about music, secret messages, and winter days.

Ana, a 14-years old girl lives in Buenos Aires with her artist and teacher father Javier. After an accident, when she was a child, she needed prosthetics and has a metal plate in her arm. During the winter holidays, she starts to feel mysterious pulses in the plate. Without telling Javier, she composes a melody called "The Heartbeat Song" with her friend Lepa, inspired by the rhythmic signals. One night, an argument with Lepa leads Ana to roam the city alone. She meets a young soldier who reveals that the pulses are actually words in Morse code. Ana becomes determined to decode the words, realizing that her arm is an antenna to an unknown mystery. As she delves into the maze of secret messages, she distances herself from her friend and her dad. The previously harmonious winter holiday is transformed by Ana's obsession as she wonders if the coded words are addressed specifically to her.

== Cast ==
- Sofía Clausen as Ana
- Pablo Seijo as Javier
- Lina Ziccarello as Lepa
- Mercedes Halfon as Mariana
- Santiago Ferreira as Pablo
- Walter Jakob as Alfonso

== Release ==
The Major Tones had its premiere at 38th Mar del Plata International Film Festival in Argentine Competition on 7 November 2023.

It had its International premiere on 17 February 2024, as part of the 74th Berlin International Film Festival, in Generation Kplus.

The film was screened in Zonazine section at the 27th Málaga Film Festival on 3 March 2024. Distributed by 39 Escalones Films, it was released theatrically in Spain on 12 July 2024.

== Accolades ==
Award	Date	Category	Recipient	Result	Ref.
Mar del Plata International Film Festival	12 November 2023	Special Jury Mention & Best Film in Official Competition by a Latin American director up to 35 years old	Ingrid Pokropek	Won	
Berlin International Film Festival	25 February 2024	Generation Kplus Crystal Bear for Best Feature Film	Ingrid Pokropek	Nominated	
Málaga Film Festival	9 March 2024	Silver Biznaga for Best Ibero-American Film ('Zonazine' sidebar competition)	The Major Tones	Won	
Málaga Film Festival	9 March 2024	Silver Biznaga for Best Actress in a Leading Role ('Zonazine' sidebar competition)	Sofía Clausen	Won	
Jeonju International Film Festival	7 May 2024	Grand Prize in International Competition Category	The Major Tones	Won	
Seattle International Film Festival	19 May 2024	Ibero-American Competition Special Jury Prize	The Major Tones	Won	

== See also ==
- List of Spanish films of 2024
