= Five Square Meters =

- Theatrical release poster
- Spanish: 5 metros cuadrados
- Directed by: Max Lemcke
- Screenplay by: Daniel Remón; Pablo Remón
- Produced by: Isabel García Peralta
- Starring: Fernando Tejero; Malena Alterio; Emilio Gutiérrez Caba; Manuel Morón; Jorge Bosch; Secun de la Rosa
- Cinematography: José David Montero
- Edited by: Laurent Dufreche; Ascen Marchena
- Music by: Fernando Velázquez
- Production company: Aliwood Mediterráneo Producciones
- Distributed by: A Contracorriente Films
- Release dates: 27 March 2011 (Málaga); 11 November 2011 (Spain)
- Country: Spain
- Language: Spanish

Five Square Meters (Spanish: 5 metros cuadrados) is a 2011 Spanish drama film directed by Max Lemcke from a screenplay by Daniel Remón and Pablo Remón which stars Fernando Tejero and Malena Alterio.

== Plot ==
After Álex and Virginia took a 40-year mortgage to purchase an apartment and just some months before being handed the keys, the building works are halted, bringing complications to the couple.

== Cast ==
- Fernando Tejero as Álex
- Malena Alterio as Virginia
- Jorge Bosch as Toño
- Manuel Morón as Arganda
- Secun de la Rosa as Nacho
- Emilio Gutiérrez Caba as Montañés

== Production ==
The film was produced by Aliwood Mediterráneo Producciones. Shooting locations included the Ciudad de la Luz film studio in Alicante.

== Release ==
The film was presented at the 14th Málaga Film Festival on 27 March 2011. Distributed by A Contracorriente Films, it was released theatrically in Spain on 11 November 2011.

== Reception ==
Jonathan Holland of Variety deemed the "timely" drama film to represent "a satisfyingly compact, solidly built property offering fine views of corruption in the Spanish construction biz".

Miriro Torreiro of Fotogramas rated the film 3 out of 5 stars, praising the "rigor" at handling the protagonists' mishaps as the best thing about the film, while citing the ending as the film's worst.

Irene Crespo of Cinemanía rated the film 3 out of 5 stars, assessing out that the comedy side is built on solid foundations but the drama elements (and the ending) stumble.

== Accolades ==
Year	Award	Category	Nominee(s)	Result	Ref.
2011	14th Málaga Film Festival	Golden Biznaga		Won	
2011	14th Málaga Film Festival	Silver Biznaga for Best Actor	Fernando Tejero	Won	
2011	14th Málaga Film Festival	Best Supporting Actor	Jorge Bosch	Won	
2011	14th Málaga Film Festival	Critics' Prize		Won	
2011	14th Málaga Film Festival	Best Screenplay	Pablo Remón, Daniel Remón	Won	

== See also ==
- List of Spanish films of 2011
