= 27th Málaga Film Festival =

2024 film festival

- Official poster by Fabián Suárez
- Opening film: Dragonkeeper
- Closing film: Uncle Trouble
- Location: Málaga, Spain
- Awards: Golden Biznaga (Saturn Return and Radical)
- Festival date: 1–10 March 2024

Málaga Film Festival
- 2025 2023

The 27th Málaga Film Festival ran in Málaga, Spain from 1 to 10 March 2024.

== Background ==
In October 2023, festival director Juan Antonio Vigar stated that the organization was seeking to thin the non-competitive slate of the festival's official selection compared to the 26th Málaga Film Festival's. The official poster for the 27th edition (a work by Narita Estudio's Fabián Suárez) was presented on 3 November 2023. On 1 February 2024, Spanish-Chinese animated picture Dragonkeeper was disclosed as the opening film of the official selection. The opening gala was hosted by La Dani, Omar Banana, and Marta Etura. Uncle Trouble screened as the festival's closing film. The closing gala was hosted by Elena Sánchez and Julián López.

== Juries ==
The juries consist of the following members:

=== Official competition ===
- Claudia Piñeiro, Argentine writer, playwright and scriptwriter (Jury president)
- José Luis Rebordinos, Spanish festival programmer
- Javier Ruiz Caldera, Spanish film director
- Alejandro Loayza Grisi, Bolivian film director
- Antonia Zegers, Chilean actress
- Daniela Fejerman, Argentine film director and scriptwriter

=== Zonazine ===
- Itziar Atienza, Spanish actress
- Ernesto Daranas, Cuban film director
- María Luisa Mayol, Chilean actress

== Festival slate ==
The festival's film slate is listed as follows:

=== Official Selection ===
==== In competition ====
Highlighted title indicates section's best film winners.

English title	Original title	Director(s)	Production countrie(s)
The Abbess	La abadesa	Antonio Chavarrías	Spain; Belgium
As Neves		Sonia Méndez	Spain
Birds Flying East	Pájaros	Pau Durà	Spain
La casa		Álex Montoya	Spain
Dragonkeeper	Dragonkeeper (Guardiana de dragones)	Salvador Simó, Li Jianping	Spain; China
Golán		Orlando Culzat	Colombia
A Hipster in Rural Spain	Un hipster en la España vacía	Emilio Martínez-Lázaro	Spain
El hombre bueno		David Trueba	Spain
Little Loves	Los pequeños amores	Celia Rico Clavellino	Spain; France
Rain	Lluvia	Rodrigo García Saiz	Mexico
Naufragios		Vanina Spataro	Argentina; Uruguay
Nina		Andrea Jaurrieta	Spain
Radical		Christopher Zalla	Mexico
Rest in Peace	Descansar en paz	Sebastián Borensztein	Argentina
Saturn Return	Segundo premio	Isaki Lacuesta, Pol Rodríguez	Spain
Los terrenos		Verónica Chen	Argentina; Uruguay; Brazil
We Treat Women Too Well	Tratamos demasiado bien a las mujeres	Clara Bilbao	Spain; France
Wild Woman	La mujer salvaje	Alán González	Cuba
Yana-Wara		Óscar Catacora, Tito Catacora	Peru

==== Out of competition ====
English title	Original title	Director(s)	Production countrie(s)
La bandera		Martín Cuervo	Spain
Checkmates	Menudas piezas	Nacho G. Velilla	Spain
Como el mar		Nicolás Gil Lavedra	Argentina; Uruguay
Disco, Ibiza, Locomía		Kike Maíllo	Spain; Mexico
Ellipsis	Puntos suspensivos	David Marqués	Spain
Uncle Trouble	La familia Benetón	Joaquín Mazón	Spain; Mexico
Stories	Historias	Paco Sepúlveda	Spain
Invasión		David Martín-Porras	Spain
Jumping the Fence	El salto	Benito Zambrano	Spain; France
Matusalén		David Galán Galindo	Spain
El molino		Alfonso Cortés-Cavanillas	Spain
Un pájaro azul		Ariel Rotter	Argentina; Uruguay
Por tus muertos		Sayago Ayuso	Spain
The Quiet Maid	Calladita	Miguel Faus	Spain
The Sleeping Woman	La mujer dormida	Laura Alvea	Spain; United States
The Shadow of the Sun	La sombra del sol	Miguel Ángel Ferrer	Venezuela; United States
Alone in the Night	Solos en la noche	Guillermo Rojas	Spain
Yo no soy esa		María Ripoll	Spain

=== Series ===
English title	Original title	Director(s)	Production countrie(s)
Eva y Nicole		David Molina, Antonio Hernández, Álvaro Vicario	Spain
See You in Another Life	Nos vemos en otra vida	Jorge Sánchez-Cabezudo	Spain
Un nuevo amanecer		José Corbacho, Belén Macías	Spain
Operación Barrio Inglés		Chiqui Carabante, José Ramón Ayerra	Spain

=== Zonazine ===
Highlighted title indicates section's best film winners.

English title	Original title	Director(s)	Production countrie(s)
Historia de pastores		Jaime Puertas Castillo	Spain
The Undergrowth	La hojarasca	Macu Machín	Spain
La zona vacía		Kurro González	Spain
Los milagros existen		Andrés Llugany	Argentina
The Major Tones	Los tonos mayores	Ingrid Pokropek	Argentina; Spain
Firedream	Lumbresueño	José Pablo Escamilla	Mexico
Orgullo Vieja		Chema Rodríguez	Spain

=== Mosaico: International Scene ===
English title	Original title	Director(s)	Production countrie(s)
Funny Birds	Au fil des saisons	Hanna Ladoul, Marco La Via	France; Belgium
Iris	Iris et les Hommes	Caroline Vignal	France
Consent	Le Consentement	Vanessa Filho	France; Belgium
Stella. A Life.	Stella. Ein Leben.	Kilian Riedhof	Germany
The Owner	Хозяин	Yuri Bykov	Russia; France; Switzerland
Light Light Light	Valoa valoa valoa	Inari Niemi	Finland
Woman Of...	Kobieta z...	Małgorzata Szumowska, Michał Englert	Poland

== Awards ==
A list of festival awards is listed as follows:

=== Official selection ===
- Best Spanish Film: Saturn Return
- Best Latin-American Film: Radical
- Special Jury Prize: Little Loves
- Best Director: Isaki Lacuesta, Pol Rodríguez (Saturn Return)
- Best Actress: Lola Amores (Wild Woman)
- Best Actor: Luis Zahera (Birds Flying East) & Joaquín Furriel (Rest in Peace)
- Best Supporting Actress: Adriana Ozores (Little Loves)
- Best Supporting Actor: Gabriel Goity (Rest in Peace)
- Best Screenplay: Álex Montoya, Joana M. Ortueta (La casa)
- Best Music: Fernando Velázquez (La casa)
- Best Cinematography: Juan Carlos Martínez (Golán)
- Best Editing: Javi Frutos (Saturn Return)

=== Other ===
- Special Critics' Jury Prize: Nina
- Special Audience Award: La casa

=== Zonazine ===
- Best Spanish Film: The Undergrowth
- Best Latin-American Film: The Major Tones
- Best Director: Macu Machín (The Undergrowth)
- Best Actress: Sofía Clausen (The Major Tones)
- Best Actor: Diego Solís (Lumbrensueño)
- Audience Award: Orgullo Vieja
