= Samichay, In Search of Happiness =

Samichay
- Film poster
- Directed by: Mauricio Franco Tosso
- Written by: Mauricio Franco Tosso
- Produced by: Sergio García Locatelli; Ray Marvin Carmona Quillahuaman; Juan Castro de Jong (Associated)
- Starring: Amiel Cayo Coaquira; Agustina Aurelia Cougar Ccallo
- Cinematography: Hugo Carmona Chacón
- Edited by: Mauricio Franco Tosso
- Music by: Sonia Ccahuana Huarancca; Amiel Cayo Coaquira; Pedro Canalle
- Production company: Quinta Imagen Films
- Release dates: December 2019 (Ventana Sur); August 4, 2022 (Peruvian cinemas)
- Running time: 86 minutes
- Country: Peru
- Language: Quechua

Samichay, In Search of Happiness (Spanish: Samichay, en busca de la felicidad) is a 2019 Quechua-language Peruvian black-and-white drama film written and directed by Mauricio Franco Tosso (in his directorial debut), spoken in Cuzco Quechua and premiered at the Lima Film Festival, about the journey of a peasant quechua with his cow called Samichay in the Andes of Peru. It was awarded at film festivals in Peru, Spain and Chile. The film had its commercial premiere in Peruvian theaters on August 4, 2022.

== Synopsis ==
Celestino (Amiel Cayo), a Quechua peasant in the Andes, after his mother and wife die, only has his daughter and mother-in-law for company. Your daughter wants to move to her aunt to find a better life. Celestino is left alone with his skinny cow Samichay who provides him with milk. He hopes that Samichay will have a shoot, but the cow is as barren as the region's scarce soil. Celestino sets out to sell his beloved cow. He believes that Samichay brings good luck, but on the contrary, the cow is very malnourished and therefore lost weight. His "healing journey" takes him "from the solitude and height of the Andes to the chaos of urbanization and towns."

== Production ==
The director Mauricio Franco Tosso, born in Lima in 1978 and with family in Huancayo, had already shot documentaries and short films where Dutch, where he had seen Dutch, German and other foreigners talking with people in Quechua, while he did not know it. Once returning from the filming of a documentary, he saw a farmer speaking in Quechua with his son who wanted to give a ram a name, while the father did not, because the ram was cattle, not a pet. That is why he decided to make a film about the Andes in that language.

Samichay, In Search of Happiness is the first feature film by director Mauricio Franco Tosso. It was shot in the provinces of Quispicanchi (Palquella, district of Marcapata) and Canchis in the department of Cusco at heights of more than 4000 meters. The main role was played by the professional actor Amiel Cayo Coaquira from Puno, already known from another film spoken in Quechua, Retablo, and for the rest Quechua peasants of the region representing themselves in their own linguistic variant, Cuzco Quechua (Cuzco-Collao). They shot three weeks in September 2018 in black and white. The film was made nine years from its first idea. The name of the cow "Samichay" was taken from a cat of that name, from a friend of the director. The works of the companies Quechua Films of Spain and Quinta Imagen of Peru were financed by Spanish and Peruvian funds.

== Release, festivals and awards ==
Already in December 2019, the film Samichay was presented in Buenos Aires at the Festival Ventana Sur. In August 2020, it had its premiere in Peru at the Film Festival of the PUCP in Lima, where he achieved the honorable mention for Best First Film and Best Peruvian Film. In October 2020, it was officially released in theaters in Peru, but due to the COVID-19 pandemic in digital form.

In June 2021, he won the Biznaga de Plata award for Best Director in the ZonaZine section at the 24th Málaga Film Festival (Málaga, Spain). At the International Film Festival of Viña del Mar (FICVIÑA) in Chile in September 2021, he won two awards: the Premio University of Valparaìso for Best Director of a Fiction Feature Film and the Specialized Critics Award. The film also participated in the International Festival of New Latin American Cinema in Havana in December 2021.
