= The Cover (film) =

2021 Spanish film

- Theatrical release poster
- Spanish: El cover
- Directed by: Secun de la Rosa
- Written by: Secun de la Rosa
- Starring: Àlex Monner; Marina Salas; Carolina Yuste; Lander Otaola; Susi Sánchez; Carmen Machi; Juan Diego
- Production companies: Nadie es Perfecto; Stop Line
- Distributed by: eOne Spain
- Release dates: 3 June 2021 (Málaga); 23 July 2021 (Spain)
- Country: Spain
- Language: Spanish

The Cover (Spanish: El cover) is a 2021 Spanish romantic comedy musical film directed and written by Secun de la Rosa which stars Àlex Monner and Marina Salas, also featuring Carolina Yuste, Lander Otaola and the special collaboration of Carmen Machi, Susi Sánchez and Juan Diego.

== Plot ==
The fiction takes place in Benidorm, with the backdrop of performers earning a living by singing cover songs of popular singers, featuring songs by the likes of The Killers, Erasure, Lady Gaga, Shirley Bassey, Gloria Gaynor, Fun, La Marelu, Loquillo, Antonio Vega, Nena Daconte, or Raphael. Dani is a young man working as a waiter who has put behind musical aspirations. He meets Sandra, a singer working in hotels who imitates Adele.

== Cast ==
- Àlex Monner as Dani
- Marina Salas as Sandra (Adele imitator)
- Carolina Yuste as Margarita (Amy Winehouse imitator)
- Lander Otaola as Pierre
- Susi Sánchez
- Carmen Machi
- Juan Diego
- María Hervás as Moni
- Jorge Calvo as Liza Minnelli imitator

== Production ==
Written and directed by Secun de la Rosa, The Cover is de la Rosa's directorial debut film. Produced by Nadie es Perfecto and Stop Line, it had the collaboration of GTS Entertainment (Universal Music Group Partner), Amazon Prime Video and Entertainment One. Shooting began in 2020 and was disrupted by the COVID-19 pandemic, including a 3-month hiatus due to the COVID-19 lockdown. The wrap was reported in July 2020.

Besides the musical jukebox, the film features an original song ("Que me busquen por dentro") performed by Antonio Orozco as well as songs performed by the original artists (Agoney, Rocío Márquez and Kexxy Pardo).

== Release ==
The film opened the 24th Málaga Film Festival on 3 June 2021. Distributed by eOne Spain, it was theatrically released in Spain on 23 July 2021.

== Reception ==
Fausto Fernández of Fotogramas gave the film 4 out of 5 stars, praising the "affection and sensitivity" displayed by Secun de la Rosa towards his characters.

Andrea G. Bermejo of Cinemanía gave it 3 out of 5 stars, writing that while "not a perfect film", featuring production issues possibly stemming from the pandemic disruption, that would not detract nonetheless from the film's "freshness and spontaneity".

== Awards and nominations ==
| Year | Award | Category | Nominee(s) | Result | Ref. |
|---|---|---|---|---|---|
| 2021 | 4th Berlanga Awards | Best Costume Design | Giovanna Ribes | Won | |
| 2021 | 4th Berlanga Awards | Best Make-Up and Hairstyles | Vicén Betí | Won | |
| 2021 | 4th Berlanga Awards | Best Sound | José Manuel Sospedra | Won | |
| 2021 | 4th Berlanga Awards | Best Original Score | Nacho Mañó & Joana Estevao | Won | |
| 2021 | 4th Berlanga Awards | Best Supporting Actress | Carolina Yuste | Won | |
| 2022 | 9th Feroz Awards | Best Comedy Film | | Nominated | |

== See also ==
- List of Spanish films of 2021
