= Andrea Jaurrieta =

Spanish film director

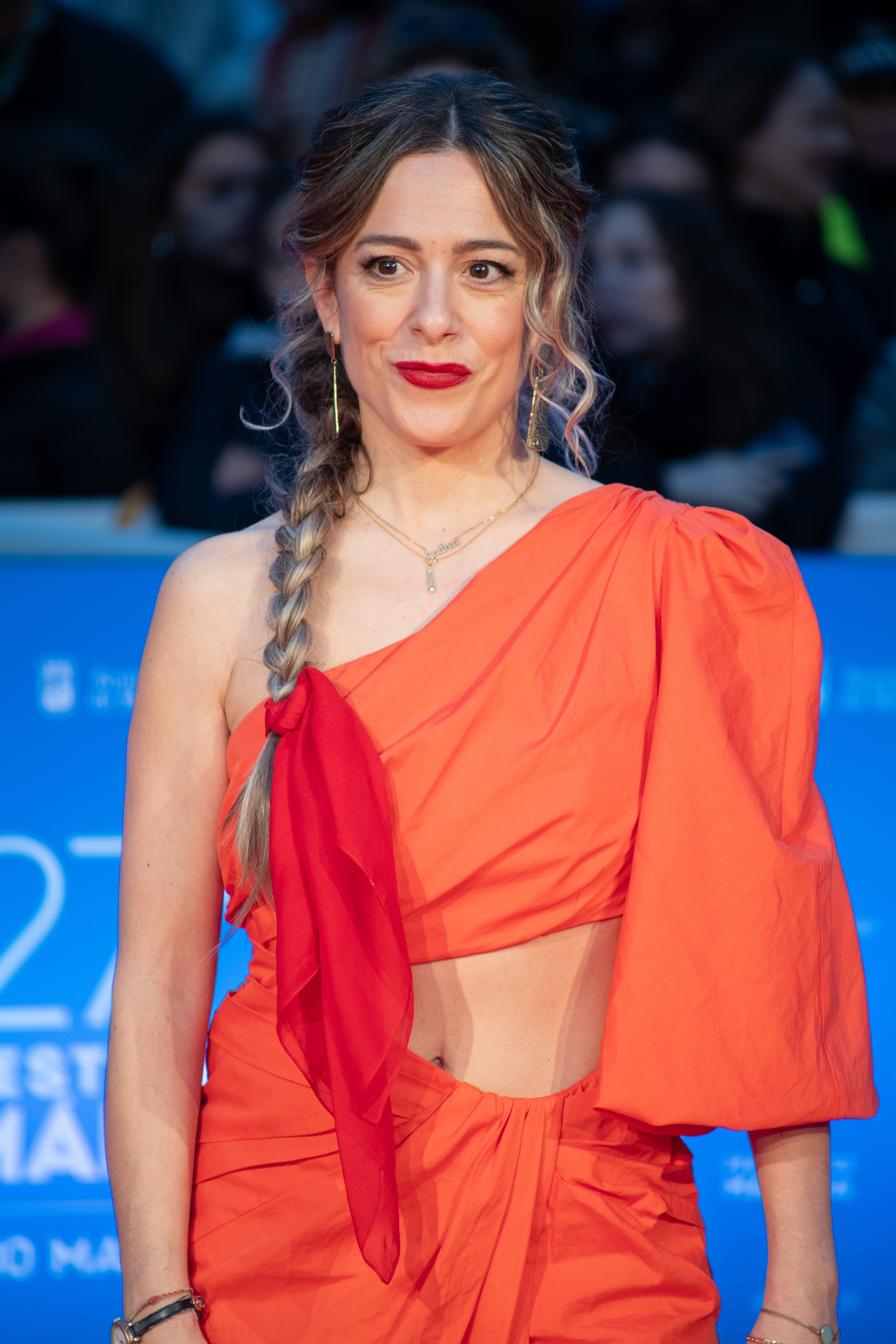
- Jaurrieta in 2024
- Born: Andrea Jaurrieta Bariain; 1986 (age 38–39); Pamplona, Navarre, Spain
- Occupation(s): Film director, screenwriter

Andrea Jaurrieta Bariain (born 1986) is a Spanish filmmaker.

== Life and career ==
Andrea Jaurrieta Bariain was born in Pamplona, Navarre in 1986. After earning a licentiate degree in Audiovisual Communication from the Complutense University of Madrid, she took further education in direction from the ESCAC and dramatic art from the William Layton Lab. She involved in the making of short films in her early career, including Entresuelo (2008), S.E.D. (2009), Todos acabaremos solos (2011), A pleno sol (2012), Los años dirán (2013), and Algunas aves vuelan solas (2016). She used a crowdfunding campaign to fund her debut feature, Ana by Day (2018), starring Ingrid García-Jonsson. Her work earned her a nomination to the Goya Award for Best New Director.

Her sophomore feature Nina (2024) premiered at the 27th Málaga Film Festival earning the Critics' Prize. In the film, starring Patricia López Arnaiz and renewing Jaurrieta's interest in the theme of broken identities already displayed in Ana by Day, Jaurrieta bet again on a type of filmmaking "far removed from naturalism".
