= Nina (2024 film) =

- Film poster
- Directed by: Andrea Jaurrieta
- Written by: Andrea Jaurrieta
- Based on: Nina by José Ramón Fernández
- Produced by: Alex Lafuente; José Nolla; Ander Sagardoy; Ander Barinaga-Rementeria; Xabier Berzosa
- Starring: Patricia López Arnaiz; Darío Grandinetti; Aina Picarolo; Iñigo Aranburu; Mar Sodupe; Ramon Agirre; Silvia de Pé
- Cinematography: Juli Carné Martorell
- Edited by: Miguel Ángel Trudu
- Music by: Zeltia Montes
- Production companies: Iconica Producciones; BTeam Prods; Irusoin; Nina La Película AIE; Lasai Producciones
- Distributed by: BTeam Pictures
- Release dates: 4 March 2024 (Málaga); 10 May 2024 (Spain)
- Country: Spain
- Language: Spanish

Nina is a 2024 Spanish thriller drama film directed and written by Andrea Jaurrieta which stars Patricia López Arnaiz as the title character alongside Darío Grandinetti.

== Plot ==
45-year-old Nina returns to her seaside hometown, the fictional Arteire, ready to exact revenge on the man who ruined her life thirty years before.

== Cast ==
- Patricia López Arnaiz as Nina
- Darío Grandinetti as Pedro
- Aina Picarolo as Nina joven
- Iñigo Aranburu as Blas
- Mar Sodupe
- Ramón Agirre
- Silvia de Pé
- Daniel Vitallé
- Eneko Gutiérrez Lavandero

== Production ==
Written by Andrea Jaurrieta and consisting of a "very loose" adaptation of the play Nina by José Ramón Fernández, the film blends drama with elements of neo-Western. Nina is a BTeam Prods, Icónica Producciones, Irusoin and Lasai Producciones production, with participation of EiTB, Movistar Plus+, Filmin and Vodafone TV, and backing from ICAA, the Basque Government, the Madrid regional administration, and the Government of Navarre. Shooting locations included Mundaka, Bermeo, the Laga Beach and Busturia.

== Release ==
The film premiered in the 27th Málaga Film Festival's main competition on 4 March 2024, vying for the Golden Biznaga. Distributed by BTeam Pictures, it was released theatrically in Spain on 10 May 2024. Nina also made it to the programme of the 42nd Torino Film Festival.

== Reception ==
On the review aggregator website Rotten Tomatoes, 83% of 6 critics' reviews are positive, with an average rating of 7.2/10.

Rubén Romero Santos of Cinemanía rated the film 4 out of 5 stars, mentioning a "spectacular" López Arnaiz, "the best Spanish actress at getting pissed off on screen".

Ekaitz Ortega of HobbyConsolas gave the film 86 points ('very good') citing "Jaurrieta's control of the tempo, the ambitious commitment to never let the viewer rest at any moment and the performances" as the best things about the film.

Luis Martínez of El Mundo gave the film 4 stars, writing that Jaurrieta "approaches Almodóvar's manners to compose a story tinged with melodrama".

== Accolades ==
Year	Award	Category	Nominee(s)	Result	Ref.
2024	27th Málaga Film Festival	Critics Award		Won	
2025	12th Platino Awards	Best Supporting Actor	Darío Grandinetti	Pending	

== See also ==
- List of Spanish films of 2024
