= Por tus muertos =

- Theatrical release poster
- Directed by: Sayago Ayuso
- Screenplay by: Sayago Ayuso; Paco Mateo; Juanjo Ramírez Mascaró
- Produced by: Gerardo Esteban Baranowski Jeric; Hernán Zin; Diego Rodríguez
- Starring: José Mota; Jorge Sanz; Marta Belenguer; Carles Francino; Emilio Linder; Agustín Jiménez; Sayago Ayuso; David Pavón
- Cinematography: Jacobo Vázquez Dodero
- Edited by: Juanfer Andrés
- Music by: Paco Fominaya; Miguel Fominaya
- Production companies: Por tus muertos AIE; Súper 8; Doc Land; La Charito Films; RTVE
- Distributed by: Buena Vista International
- Release dates: 2 March 2024 (Málaga); 8 March 2024 (Spain)
- Country: Spain
- Language: Spanish

Por tus muertos is a 2024 Spanish comedy film directed by Sayago Ayuso which stars José Mota, Jorge Sanz, Marta Belenguer, and Carles Francino.

== Plot ==
Former member of 1980s rock act Metralla Miguel lingers on his dream of still being a rock star. He is offered a gig under the condition of gathering the band's original members.

== Cast ==
- José Mota as Miguel
- Jorge Sanz as Valen
- Marta Belenguer as la Janis
- Carles Francino as el Repollo
- Emilio Linder
- Agustín Jiménez
- Sayago Ayuso
- David Pavón
- Juan Pablo Ordúñez "Pirata"
- Vicente Romero "Mariscal"

== Production ==
The film was produced by Por tus muertos AIE, Súper 8, Doc Land, La Charito Films and RTVE and it had the participation of RTVE and Prime Video and backing from the Madrid regional administration. Shooting locations included Madrid, Alcobendas, and Boadilla del Monte.

== Release ==
The film premiered in a non-competitive slot of the 27th Málaga Film Festival on 2 March 2024. Distributed by Buena Vista International, it was released theatrically in Spain on 8 March 2024.

== Reception ==
Raquel Hernández Luján of HobbyConsolas gave the film 30 points ('bad') considering it to be "[just] another production that shows that Spanish comedy is a genre in the doldrums".

Enid Román Almansa of Cinemanía rated the film 2 out of 5 stars, warning that "not even José Mota's Christmas special [can] prepare you for this [film]" in the verdict.

== See also ==
- List of Spanish films of 2024
