= Cold Call (film) =

- Theatrical release poster
- Spanish: A puerta fría
- Directed by: Xavi Puebla
- Screenplay by: Jesús Gil Vilda; Xavi Puebla
- Produced by: Antonio P. Pérez
- Starring: Antonio Dechent; María Valverde; Nick Nolte; José Luis García Pérez; Héctor Colomé
- Cinematography: Mauro Herce
- Edited by: Jorge Suárez
- Production company: Maestranza Films
- Distributed by: Oliete Films
- Release dates: 22 April 2012 (Málaga); 15 April 2013 (Spain)
- Country: Spain
- Languages: Spanish; English

Cold Call (Spanish: A puerta fría) is a 2012 Spanish film directed and co-written by Xavi Puebla, which stars Antonio Dechent and María Valverde alongside Nick Nolte, José Luis García Pérez, and Héctor Colomé.

== Plot ==
Desperate in an effort to sell 500 product units in three days in order to avoid losing his job, a salesman of electric appliances (Salva) enlists the help from a convention hostess (Inés) to concoct a plan in order to convince a major North-American customer (Battleworth) during an industry fair.

== Cast ==
- Antonio Dechent as Salva
- María Valverde as Inés
- Nick Nolte as Battleworth
- José Luis García Pérez as Toni
- Héctor Colomé as Carmelo
- Alex O'Dogherty
- José Ángel Egido
- Sergio Caballero
- Cesáreo Estébanez

== Production ==
The screenplay was written by Jesús Gil Vilda and Xavi Puebla. Maestranza Films' Antonio Pérez took over production duties. Shooting locations included Seville.

== Release ==
The film was presented at the 15th Málaga Film Festival's main competition in April 2012. Its festival run also included the Toulouse Spanish Film Festival. Distributed by Oliete Films, it was theatrically released in Spain on 15 March 2013.

== Reception ==
Mirito Torreiro of Fotogramas rated the film 4 out of 5 stars, highlighting the great direction of the actors.

Edu Galán of Cinemanía rated the film 4 out of 5 stars, deeming it to be a "magnificent fable about a loser with no way out" in which Dechent and Valverde perform a "psycho-anthropological transaction".

== Accolades ==
Year	Award	Category	Nominee(s)	Result	Ref.
2012	15th Málaga Film Festival	Silver Biznaga for Best Actor	Antonio Dechent	Won	
2012	15th Málaga Film Festival	Critics Award		Won	
2012	17th Toulouse Spanish Film Festival	Best Actor	Antonio Dechent	Won	
2012	17th Toulouse Spanish Film Festival	Best Screenplay	Jesús Gil Vilda, Xavi Puebla	Won	
2014	23rd Actors and Actresses Union Awards	Best Film Actor in a Minor Role	José Luis García Pérez	Nominated	
2014	58th Sant Jordi Awards	Best Spanish Actor	Antonio Dechent	Won	

== See also ==
- List of Spanish films of 2013
