= Fading Memories =

- Film poster
- Spanish: Las huellas borradas
- Directed by: Enrique Gabriel
- Screenplay by: Enrique Gabriel; Lucía Lipschutz
- Produced by: Tomás Cimadevilla; Enrique González Macho
- Starring: Federico Luppi; Mercedes Sampietro; Elena Anaya; Héctor Alterio
- Cinematography: Raúl Pérez Cubero
- Edited by: Julio Peña
- Music by: Ramón Paús
- Production companies: Trastorno Films; Alta Films; Sinfonía Otoñal
- Release dates: 3 June 1999 (Málaga); 19 November 1999 (Spain); 17 February 2000 (Argentina)
- Running time: 98 minute
- Countries: Spain; Argentina
- Language: Spanish

Fading Memories aka Wiped-Out Footprints (Spanish: Las huellas borradas) is a 1999 Spanish-Argentine drama film directed by Enrique Gabriel which stars Federico Luppi, Mercedes Sampietro, Elena Anaya, and Héctor Alterio.

== Plot ==
The plot concerns about the return to the Leonese village of Higueras of Manuel Perea (an emigrant to Argentina), seeking to rekindle with Virginia, her former love interest as well as widowed sister-in-law. Upon his arrival he meets the plight of desperation of the folks, as the construction of a new reservoir is going to drown the village for good.

== Cast ==
- Federico Luppi as Manuel Perea
- Mercedes Sampietro as Virginia
- Elena Anaya as Rosa
- Héctor Alterio as don José
- Sergi Calleja as Delfín
- Armando del Río as Mito
- Mariví Bilbao as Leoni
- Joan Dalmau as don Paulino
- Txema Blasco as Eutimio
- Raúl Fraire as Antonio
- Paco Sagarzazu as Urbano
- Ramón Barea as Zayas
- Marga Escudero as Pili
- Lourdes Bartolomé as Goya
- Asunción Balaguer as Felisa
- Mario Pardo

== Production ==
The screenplay was penned by Enrique Gabriel alongside Lucía Lipschutz. The film is a Spanish-Argentine co-production by Trastorno Films, Alta Films, and Sinfonía Otoñal. It was shot in Olleros de Pisuerga, province of Palencia.

== Release ==
The film was presented at the 2nd Málaga Film Festival, screened in competition on 3 June 1999. It was theatrically released in Spain on 19 November 1999. It was theatrically released in Argentina on 17 February 2000.

== Reception ==
Horacio Bernades of Página/12 rated the film with 7 points, considering that "Luppi is impeccable", despite some issues with his accent.

Paraná Sendrós of Ámbito Financiero the film achieves its purpose of opening up some feelings in us ("with honesty and in abundance)", to bring up some reflections.

== Accolades ==
Year	Award	Category	Nominee(s)	Result	Ref.
1999	2nd Málaga Film Festival	Golden Biznaga		Won	
1999	2nd Málaga Film Festival	Best Director	Enrique Gabriel	Won	
1999	2nd Málaga Film Festival	Best Actress	Asunción Balaguer	Won	
2001	49th Silver Condor Awards	Best Supporting Actor	Héctor Alterio	Nominated	

== See also ==
- List of Spanish films of 1999
- List of Argentine films of 2000
