= Uncle Trouble =

- Theatrical release poster
- Spanish: La familia Benetón
- Directed by: Joaquín Mazón
- Written by: Curro Velázquez; Benjamín Herranz
- Produced by: Jaime Ortiz de Artiñano; María Luisa Gutiérrez; Álvaro Ariza; José Fernández de Vega; Francisco E. Cordero; Ricardo Coeto
- Starring: Leo Harlem; El Langui
- Cinematography: Chiqui Palma
- Edited by: Jani Madrileño
- Music by: María Vertiz
- Production companies: Atresmedia Cine; Mamá se fue de viaje la película AIE; Bowfinger International Pictures; Esto también pasará; GLOW; BTF Media
- Distributed by: Beta Fiction Spain
- Release dates: 9 March 2024 (Málaga); 22 March 2024 (Spain)
- Countries: Spain; Mexico
- Language: Spanish

Uncle Trouble (Spanish: La familia Benetón, lit. 'the Benetón family') is a 2024 comedy film directed by Joaquín Mazón and written by Curro Velázquez and Benjamín Herranz which stars Leo Harlem and El Langui.

== Plot ==
Selfish and racist uncle Toni begrudgingly takes care of five children from different ethnic backgrounds.

== Cast ==
- Leo Harlem as Toni
- El Langui as Lolo
- Ali Dia
- Diego Montejo
- Gala Bichir
- Meilin Chen
- Kamsiyochi Ngene
- Damián Alcázar
- Diana Bovio

== Production ==
The film was produced by Atresmedia Cine, Mamá se fue de viaje la película AIE, Bowfinger International Pictures, Esto también pasará and GLOW alongside BTF Media and it had the participation of Atresmedia, and Netflix and funding from Crea SGR.

== Release ==
The film closed the 27th Málaga Film Festival in a non-competitive slot on 9 March 2024 for its world premiere. Distributed by Beta Fiction Spain, it was released theatrically in Spain on 22 March 2024, debuting with a €498,176 (71,368 admissions) opening weekend.

== Reception ==
Alberto Corona of eldiario.es considered the "stale" comedy not to [just] star a racist character, but to be [a] racist [film] in itself, also noting that the ideological operation to keep Torrente alive was as simple as taking the child audience hostage.

Beatriz Martínez of Infobae deemed the film to be "a retrograde and disrespectul comedy" "promoting xenophobia, homophobia, and sexism".

Javier Ocaña of Cinemanía rated the film 2 out of 5 stars, assessing that "Harlem's folk authenticity cannot make up for the excessive sugar" in the verdict.

Juan Pando of Fotogramas rated the film 3 out of 5 stars, singling out how it "promotes respect for diversity among children" as its hallmark.

== See also ==
- List of Spanish films of 2024
