= 2nd Platino Awards =

- Date: July 18, 2015
- Site: Starlite Auditorio in Marbella, Spain
- Hosted by: Alessandra Rosaldo, Imanol Arias, Juan Carlos Arciniegas

Highlights
- Best Film: Wild Tales
- Best Actor: Óscar Jaenada; Cantinflas
- Best Actress: Érica Rivas; Wild Tales
- Most awards: Wild Tales (8)
- Most nominations: Wild Tales (10)

The 2nd Platino Awards were presented at the Starlite Auditorio in Marbella, Spain on July 18, 2015 to honour the best in Ibero-American films of 2014.

Wild Tales received the most nominations with ten.

Wild Tales won eight awards including Best Ibero-American Film, Platino Award for Best Director for Damián Szifron and Platino Award for Best Actress for Érica Rivas.

== Winners and nominees ==
=== Major awards ===
Best Ibero-American Film	Best Director
Wild Tales • Argentina; Behavior • Cuba; Marshland • Spain; Mr. Kaplan • Uruguay; Bad Hair • Venezuela	Damián Szifron – Wild Tales; Ernesto Daranas – Behavior; Alberto Rodríguez Librero – Marshland; Álvaro Brechner – Mr. Kaplan; Mariana Rondón – Bad Hair
Platino Award for Best Actor	Platino Award for Best Actress
Óscar Jaenada – Cantinflas as Cantinflas; Benicio del Toro – Escobar: Paradise Lost as Pablo Escobar; Javier Gutiérrez – Marshland as Juan Robles; Jorge Perugorría – La pared de las palabras as Luis; Leonardo Sbaraglia – Wild Tales as Diego Iturralde	Érica Rivas – Wild Tales as Romina; Geraldine Chaplin – Sand Dollars as Anne; Laura de la Uz – Vestido de novia as Rosa Elena; Leandra Leal – A Wolf at the Door as Rosa; Paulina García – Las analfabetas as Ximena; Samantha Castillo – Bad Hair as Marta
Platino Award for Best Screenplay	Platino Award for Best Original Score
Wild Tales – Damián Szifron; Behavior – Ernesto Daranas; Marshland – Alberto Rodríguez Librero & Rafael Cobos; Mr. Kaplan – Álvaro Brechner; Bad Hair – Mariana Rondón	Wild Tales – Gustavo Santaolalla; El Niño – Roque Baños; The Dance of Reality – Adan Jodorowsky; Marshland – Julio de la Rosa; The Liberator – Gustavo Dudamel; Behavior – Magda Rosa Galbán, Juan Antonio Leyva
Platino Award for Best Animated Film	Platino Award for Best Documentary
Boy and the World • Brazil; Até que a Sbórnia nos Separe • Brazil; Mummy, I'm a Zombie • Spain; La Leyenda de las Momias • Mexico; Meñique • Cuba; Mortadelo and Filemon: Mission Implausible • Spain	The Salt of the Earth • Brazil; ¿Quién es Dayani Cristal? • Mexico; El vals de los inútiles • Chile; Nacido en Gaza • Spain; Paco de Lucía: La búsqueda • Spain
Platino Award for Best Cinematography	Platino Award for Best Art Direction
Marshland – Alex Catalán; Wild Tales – Javier Julia; Behavior – Alejandro Pérez; Mr. Kaplan – Álvaro Gutiérrez; Bad Hair – Micaela Cajahuaringa	Wild Tales – Clara Notari; Marshland – Pepe Domínguez; Behavior – Erick Grass; Mr. Kaplan – Gustavo Ramírez; Bad Hair – Matías Tikas
Platino Award for Best Editing	Platino Award for Best Sound
Wild Tales – Damián Szifron & Pablo Barbieri; Marshland – José M. G. Moyano; Behavior – Pedro Suárez; Mr. Kaplan – Nacho Ruiz Capillas; Bad Hair – Marité Ugas	Wild Tales – José Luis Díaz; Marshland – Daniel de Zayas, Pelayo Gutiérrez, Nacho Royo-Villanova; Behavior – Juan Carlos Herrera, Osmany Olivare; Mr. Kaplan – Fabián Oliver, Nacho Royo-Villanova; Bad Hair – Lena Esquenazi, John Figueroa
Platino Award for Best Ibero-American First Film
The Longest Distance • Venezuela; 10,000 km • Spain; Ciencias naturales • Argentina; Mateo • Colombia; Vestido de novia • Cuba

=== Honorary Platino ===
- Antonio Banderas

== Films with multiple nominations and awards ==
The following films received multiple nominations:

Nominations	Film
10	Wild Tales
9	Marshland
8	Behavior
8	Bad Hair
7	Mr. Kaplan
2	Vestido de novia

The following films received multiple awards:

Awards	Film
8	Wild Tales
