= The Longest Distance =

- Film poster
- Spanish: La distancia más larga
- Directed by: Claudia Pinto
- Written by: Claudia Pinto
- Starring: Carme Elias; Omar Moya; Iván Tamayo
- Cinematography: Gabo Guerra
- Edited by: Elena Ruiz
- Production companies: Sin Rodeos Films; Castro PC
- Release date: August 2013 (Montreal World Film Festival)
- Running time: 113 minutes
- Countries: Venezuela; Spain
- Language: Spanish

The Longest Distance (Spanish: La distancia más larga) is a 2013 Venezuelan-Spanish drama film directed by Claudia Pinto. The film was nominated for Best Ibero-American Film at the 29th Goya Awards.

== Synopsis ==
An old woman, Martina, has discovered she is dying, and seeks to travel from Spain to the Gran Sabana in order to die on Mount Roraima, but she knows she cannot make the journey alone. Her grandson Lucas, who just lost his mom, finds her after his mother's death and spends some time with her before Martina decides to hike the mountain.

== Cast ==
- Carme Elias as Martina
- Marcos Moreno as Nasak
- Omar Moya
- Alec Whaite
- Iván Tamayo
- Isabel Rocatti

== Production ==
The film was produced by Sin Rodeos Films alongside Castro PC, with the support of CNAC and the collaboration of ICAA, TV3 and Ibermedia.

== Reception ==
In a review published for Variety, Ronnie Scheib states “Well-drawn characters, engaging performances and a convincingly rooted storyline distinguish Claudia Pinto Emperador's accomplished debut.”

== Accolades ==
Year	Award	Category	Nominee(s)	Result	Ref.
2015	29th Goya Awards	Best Ibero-American Film		Nominated	
2015	2nd Platino Awards	Best Ibero-American Debut Film		Won	
