= Summer White =

2020 Mexican drama film

- Release date: 2020
- Running time: 87 minutes
- Country: Mexico
- Language: Spanish

Summer White (Blanco de verano) is a 2020 Mexican drama in Spanish that premiered at the Sundance Film Festival.

It is rated 82% on Rotten Tomatoes. It was slated for wide release in France on June 23, 2021. It is a coming of age film about Valeria and her 13-year old son Rodrigo. Some critics praise the new director while others think it is unable to create a compelling character study.

It runs for 87 minutes.
