= Ama (film) =

2021 musical drama film

- Film poster
- Directed by: Júlia de Paz Solvas
- Written by: Júlia de Paz Solvas; Núria Dunjó López
- Starring: Tamara Casellas; Leire Marín; Estefanía de los Santos; Ana Turpin
- Cinematography: Sandra Roca
- Edited by: Oriol Milán
- Music by: Martín Sorozábal
- Production companies: La Dalia Films; Ama Movie AIE
- Distributed by: Filmax
- Release dates: 4 June 2021 (Málaga); 16 July 2021 (Spain)
- Language: Spanish

Ama is a 2021 Spanish drama film directed by Júlia de Paz Solvas which stars Tamara Casellas, also featuring Leire Marín, Estefanía de los Santos and Ana Turpin.

== Plot ==
The plot, a deconstruction of the idea of idyllic motherhood, follows Pepa, an irresponsible and foul-mouthed mother of a six-year-old daughter, Leila.

== Cast ==
- Tamara Casellas as Pepa
- Leire Marín as Leila
- Estefanía de los Santos
- Ana Turpin
- Chema del Barco
- Manuel de Blas

== Production ==
The screenplay was penned by Júlia de Paz Solvas alongside Nuria Dunjó, adapting to a feature film format the short film of the same name made by Júlia de Paz Solvas. The film was produced by La Dalia Films alongside Ama Movie AIE. Filming lasted from March to June 2020, with an hiatus caused by the COVID-19 disruption. Sandra Roca took over cinematography duties whereas Oriol Milán was responsible for film editing and Martín Sorozábal for the music. Shooting locations included L'Albir, Alicante, Benidorm, L'Alfàs del Pi and Seville.

== Release ==
Ama was presented on 4 June 2021 at the 24th Málaga Film Festival, screened as part of the festival's official selection. Distributed by Filmax, it was theatrically released in Spain on 16 July 2021.

== Reception ==
Reviewing for Fotogramas, Beatriz Martínez rated the film with 4 out of 5 stars, highlighting the superlative performance by Casellas.

Sergio F. Pinilla of Cinemanía gave the film 3.5 out of 5 stars, describing it as an uncomfortable female portrait.

Sergi Sánchez of La Razón gave it 4 out of 5 stars, praising the Casellas' performance and the rigour behind the proposal.

== Accolades ==
Year	Award	Category	Nominee(s)	Result	Ref.
2021	24th Málaga Film Festival	Silver Biznaga for Best Actress	Tamara Casellas	Won	
2021	4th Berlanga Awards	Best Actress	Tamara Casellas	Won	
2022	9th Feroz Awards	Best Actress	Tamara Casellas	Nominated	
2022	77th CEC Medals	Best New Actress	Tamara Casellas	Nominated	
2022	77th CEC Medals	Best Adapted Screenplay	Nuria Dunjó, Júlia de Paz	Nominated	
2022	36th Goya Awards	Best Adapted Screenplay	Júlia de Paz Solvas, Núria Dunjó López	Nominated	
2022	66th Sant Jordi Awards	Best Spanish Actress	Tamara Casellas	Won	

== See also ==
- List of Spanish films of 2021
