= Claudia Pinto =

Venezuelan film director and screenwriter

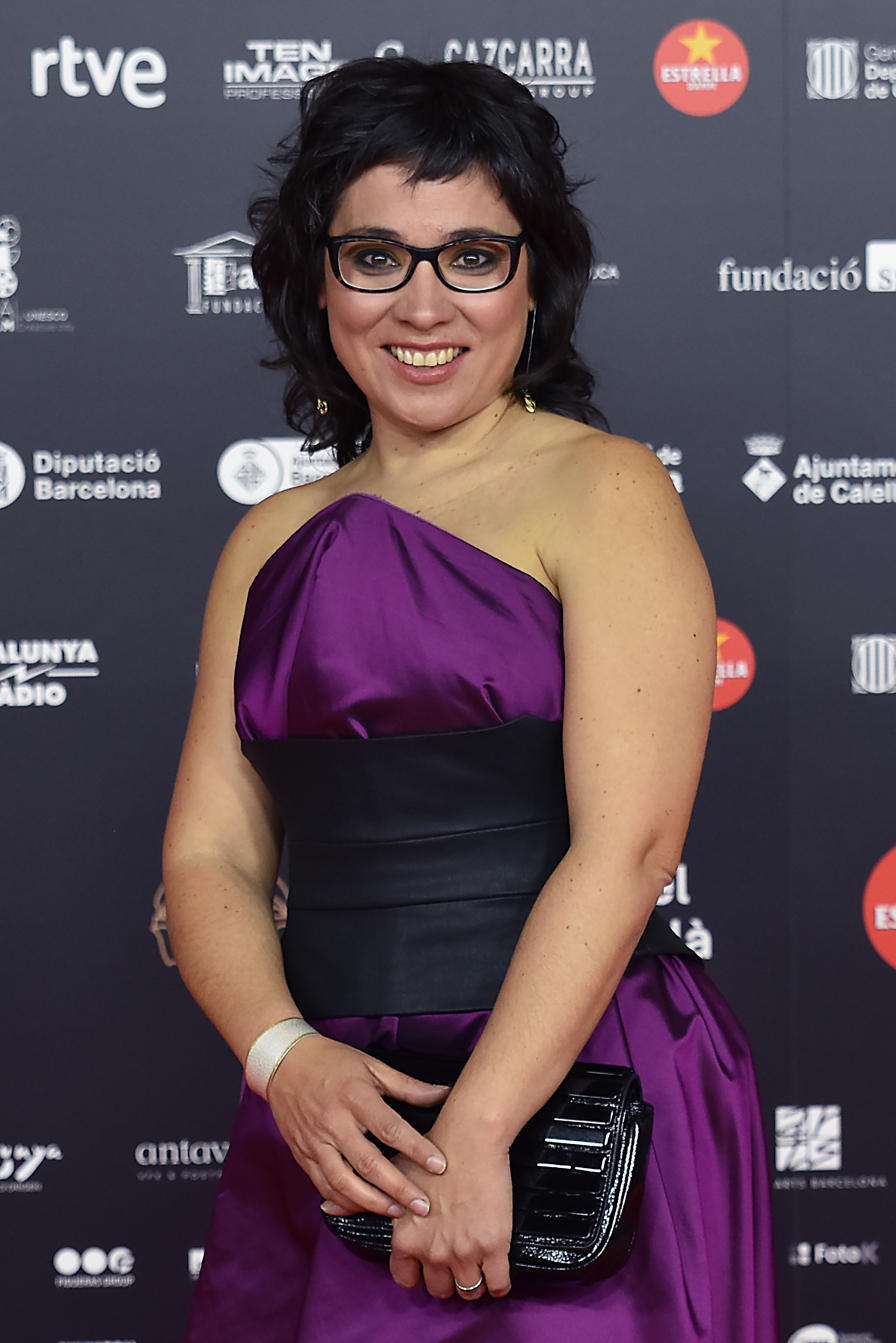
- Pinto in 2021
- Born: Claudia Pinto Emperador; 1977 (age 48–49); Caracas, Venezuela
- Occupations: Film director; television director; screenwriter; producer

Claudia Pinto Emperador (born 1977) is a Venezuelan filmmaker based in Spain.

== Life and career ==
Pinto was born in Caracas in 1977. She earned a degree in audiovisual communication from the Andrés Bello Catholic University and moved to Spain to pursue a master's degree in screenwriting. Her directorial debut feature The Longest Distance (2013) won the Platino Award for Best First Feature Film. Her sophomore feature The Consequences (2021) was co-produced through her label Sin Rodeo Films. Her documentary film While You're Still You (2023) about the development of Alzheimer's disease by her friend Carme Elias premiered at the 71st San Sebastián International Film Festival and won the Goya Award for Best Documentary. In 2025, she wrapped shooting her comedy film To Die Is Not Always Good Business.

She has been based in Valencia for over 20 years.
