= The Consequences =

- Theatrical release poster
- Spanish: Las consecuencias
- Directed by: Claudia Pinto Emperador
- Written by: Claudia Pinto Emperador; Eduardo Sánchez Rugeles
- Starring: Juana Acosta; Alfredo Castro; María Romanillos; Carme Elias
- Cinematography: Gabriel Guerra
- Production companies: Sin Rodeos Films; Las consecuencias AIE; N279 Entertainment; Potemkino; Érase una vez Films
- Distributed by: Syldavia Cinema
- Release dates: 11 June 2021 (Málaga); 17 September 2021 (Spain)
- Running time: 96 minutes
- Countries: Spain; Belgium; Netherlands
- Language: Spanish

The Consequences (Spanish: Las consecuencias) is a 2021 family drama film directed by Claudia Pinto Emperador. It stars Juana Acosta, Alfredo Castro, María Romanillos, and Carme Elias.

== Plot ==
Following a travel to a small volcanic island, a woman starts suspecting something is wrong about her family.

== Cast ==
- Juana Acosta as Fabiola
- Alfredo Castro as César
- María Romanillos as Gabi
- Carme Elías as Teresa
- Sonia Almarcha as Jimena
- Cristian Checa as Martín
- Héctor Alterio as César padre

== Production ==
The Consequences was directed by Claudia Pinto Emperador whereas the screenplay was co-written by Pinto alongside Eduardo Sánchez Rugeles.

Produced by Sin Rodeos Films and Las consecuencias AIE in co-production with N279 Entertainment, Potemkino and Érase una vez Films, the production was supported by RTVE, Eurimages, IVC (Institut Valencià de Cultura), the Netherland Film Fund, the Netherland Film Production Incentive, À Punt Mèdia, TV3 and it had the participation of CREA SRG. The film is an international Spanish–Belgian–Dutch co-production (70% – 15% – 15%). It was shot in 2019 in between the Valencia region and the Canary Islands, primarily displaying natural landscapes of the islands of La Palma and La Gomera.

== Release ==
The film was screened at the 24th Málaga Film Festival on 11 June 2021. It was theatrically released in Spain on 17 September 2021.

== Awards ==
Year	Award	Category	Nominee(s)	Result	Ref.
2021	24th Málaga Film Festival	Best Supporting Actress	María Romanillos	Won	
2021	36th Guadalajara Film Festival	Best Actress in an Ibero-American Fiction Feature Film	María Romanillos	Won	
2021	4th Berlanga Awards	Best Feature Film		Nominated	
2021	4th Berlanga Awards	Best Director	Claudia Pinto Emperador	Won	
2021	4th Berlanga Awards	Best Screenplay	Claudia Pinto Emperador & Eduardo Sánchez Rugeles	Nominated	
2021	4th Berlanga Awards	Best Actress	Juana Acosta	Nominated	
2021	4th Berlanga Awards	Best Supporting Actress	María Romanillos	Nominated	
2021	4th Berlanga Awards	Best Editing and Post-Production	Elena Ruiz	Won	
2021	4th Berlanga Awards	Best Cinematography and Lighting	Gabo Guerra	Won	
2021	4th Berlanga Awards	Best Original Score	Vincent Barrière	Nominated	
2021	4th Berlanga Awards	Best Production Supervision	Jordi Llorca, Albert Espel, Yadira Ávalos, Carme Sánchez & Claudia Pinto	Won	

== See also ==
- List of Spanish films of 2021
