= The Debt (2015 film) =

- Film poster
- Spanish: La deuda
- Directed by: Barney Elliott
- Written by: Barney Elliott
- Produced by: Ibon Cormenzana; Ignasi Estape; Darren Goldberg; Chris Marsh
- Starring: Stephen Dorff; Alberto Ammann; Carlos Bardem; David Strathairn
- Cinematography: Bjorn Stale Bratberg
- Edited by: J. L. Romeu
- Music by: Jesus Diaz; Fletcher Ventura
- Production companies: Atlantic Pictures; Arcadia Motion Pictures; Viracocha Films; Chullachaki Producciones
- Release date: April 18, 2015 (Málaga Film Festival)
- Running time: 110 minutes
- Countries: Peru; Spain; United States
- Languages: English; Spanish

The Debt (also known as Oliver's Deal or The Deal) is a 2015 thriller drama film written and directed by Barney Elliott. It stars Stephen Dorff, Elsa Olivero, Amiel Cayo, and Marco Antonio Ramirez. Dorff plays an American hedge fund banker whose attempts to purchase the debts of Peruvian landowners affects the lives of several people, including a nurse (Maria), a stubborn farmer who refuses to sell his land (Cayo), and the farmer's son (Ramirez). It is an international co-production between Peru, Spain, and the United States.

== Plot ==
With the help of his Peruvian friend Ricardo, Oliver, an American hedge fund banker, buys debts owed by the Peruvian government to landowners. Though the deals are lucrative, Ricardo has lingering doubts about whether they are helping Peruvians. At the same time, Maria, a nurse at an underfunded hospital in Lima, cares for her elderly, ailing mother, Gloria. Though Gloria needs hospital care, Maria cannot convince her superior, Dr. Cerrón, to admit her, as Gloria's illness is not life-threatening. In the Andes, a mountain farmer, Florentino, struggles to convince his neighbors not to sell their ancestral land to Caravedo, a developer who has promised to bring modernization and jobs to the area. Florentino has a strained relationship with his son, Diego, who dreams of being a pilot.

Oliver's boss, Nathan, tells him they need to pull out of Peru, as the company needs an immediate influx of money. Stunned, Oliver insists Nathan give him time to close a potential deal with Caravedo that could solve their problems. Nathan gives him one week. Though his wife is distraught that he is returning again to Peru, Oliver tells her he must close the deal or all of their previous sacrifices will be for nothing. Oliver recruits Ricardo to research Caravedo. After Oliver aggressively pressures the Peruvian finance minister to repay debts, Ricardo walks away from the Caravedo deal. He returns shortly but demands Oliver promise to abort any potential deals with Caravedo if they turn out to be exploitative.

As Gloria's condition worsens, Maria's private life becomes stressed, and Maria resorts to giving her mother morphine to dull the pain. Maria, desperate to get Gloria proper medical care, fails to seduce Dr. Cerrón. After one of her patients dies while waiting for a repeatedly delayed surgery, she blackmails Dr. Cerrón, who she learns from a colleague is having an affair with one of his medical interns. Investigating why Caravedo plans to buy out all the farms in Florentino's rural village, Ricardo finds a gold nugget a local stream. Before he can tell Oliver, Ricardo dies accidentally. At the same time, Florentino becomes incensed at his son, who has lost a llama and stolen one from a neighboring farm to cover up. Florentino tells Diego not to return until he finds it.

Caravedo tells Oliver he will only agree to a deal if Oliver convinces Florentino to sell his land. Meanwhile, Diego breaks his leg while finding the llama. Oliver arrives at Florentino's farm just after Florentino finds his injured son. As Oliver prepares to take Diego to the hospital on horseback, Oliver offers him a deal: agree to sell his land in return for Oliver's help in getting a helicopter to airlift Diego. Florentino reluctantly accepts. Dr. Cerrón tells Maria the surgeon scheduled for Gloria's operation can only help one of the two, Diego or Gloria; Dr. Cerrón leaves the decision in Maria's hands, and she chooses Gloria.

Oliver is called to identify Ricardo's dead body. When he finds the gold nugget, he angrily confronts Caravedo, only to find Nathan has already signed a deal with Caravedeo. Nathan admits he knew Caravedo planned to mine the farmers' land but says he only just learned it recently. Oliver returns to the hospital, where he learns Diego's leg has been amputated because the surgeon was not able to operate in time. Oliver hands Caravedo's contract to Maria and asks her to return it to Florentino. As Diego weakly apologizes to his father for losing the llama, Florentino tells his son he is proud of him, and Maria hands him the contract.

== Cast ==
- Stephen Dorff as Oliver
- David Strathairn as Nathan
- Brooke Langton as Kate Campbell
- Carlos Bardem as Caravedo
- Alberto Ammann as Ricardo
- Amiel Cayo as Florentino
- Marco Antonio Ramirez as Diego
- Elsa Olivero as Maria
- Melvin Quijada as Jorge, Florentino's brother
- Lucho Cáceres as Dr. Cerrón
- Delfina Paredes as Gloria, Maria's mother

== Reception ==
Rotten Tomatoes, a review aggregator, reports that 44% of nine surveyed critics gave the film a positive review; the average rating was 5.3/10. Jonathan Holland of The Hollywood Reporter called it "well-intentioned and ambitious, but full of scripting flaws", as the film "sacrifices drive and focus" in telling too many stories. Jeannette Catsoulis of The New York Times wrote, "Slow and sincere, The Debt bites off more plot than it can dramatically chew". Katie Walsh of the Los Angeles Times wrote, "Despite its best efforts to be thought-provoking, the film is dramatically inert, slow and its revelations aren't all that politically illuminating".
