= The Sea Beyond (film) =

2020 Spanish comedy-drama film

- Poster
- Spanish: Un mundo normal
- Directed by: Achero Mañas
- Screenplay by: Achero Mañas
- Produced by: Mariela Besuievsky; Pedro Pastor; Javier López Blanco; Gerardo Herrero
- Starring: Ernesto Alterio; Gala Amyach; Ruth Díaz; Pau Durà; Magüi Mira; Óscar Pastor
- Cinematography: David Omedes
- Edited by: José Manuel Jiménez
- Music by: Vanessa Garde
- Production companies: Last Will Productions AIE; Tornasol Films; Voramar Films
- Distributed by: DeAPlaneta
- Release dates: 23 August 2020 (Málaga); 11 September 2020 (Spain)
- Country: Spain
- Language: Spanish

The Sea Beyond (Spanish: Un mundo normal; lit. ''A Normal World') is a 2020 Spanish comedy-drama film written and directed by Achero Mañas. It stars Ernesto Alterio and Gala Amyach.

== Plot ==
Following the death of Carolina, the mother of Ernesto (a theatre director), the latter determines to steal the coffin in order to throw it into the sea, thus fulfilling Carolina's wish. He is accompanied in the journey through the roads of Eastern Spain by his daughter Cloe, who wants to change Ernesto's mind about his plan.

== Cast ==
- Ernesto Alterio as Ernesto
- Gala Amyach as Cloe
- Ruth Díaz as Julia
- Magüi Mira as Carolina
- Pau Durà as Max
- Óscar Pastor

== Production ==
The screenplay, with autobiographical elements, was penned by Achero Mañas. The film was produced by Last Will Productions AIE, Tornasol Films and Voramar Films in association with Sunday Morning Productions SL, with participation of RTVE, À Punt Media and Movistar+ and support from ICAA and the Valencian regional administration. David Omedes was responsible for the cinematography whereas Vanessa Garde scored the film. Filming began on 10 July 2018. Shooting locations included Madrid, the province of Castellón and the city of Valencia.

== Release ==
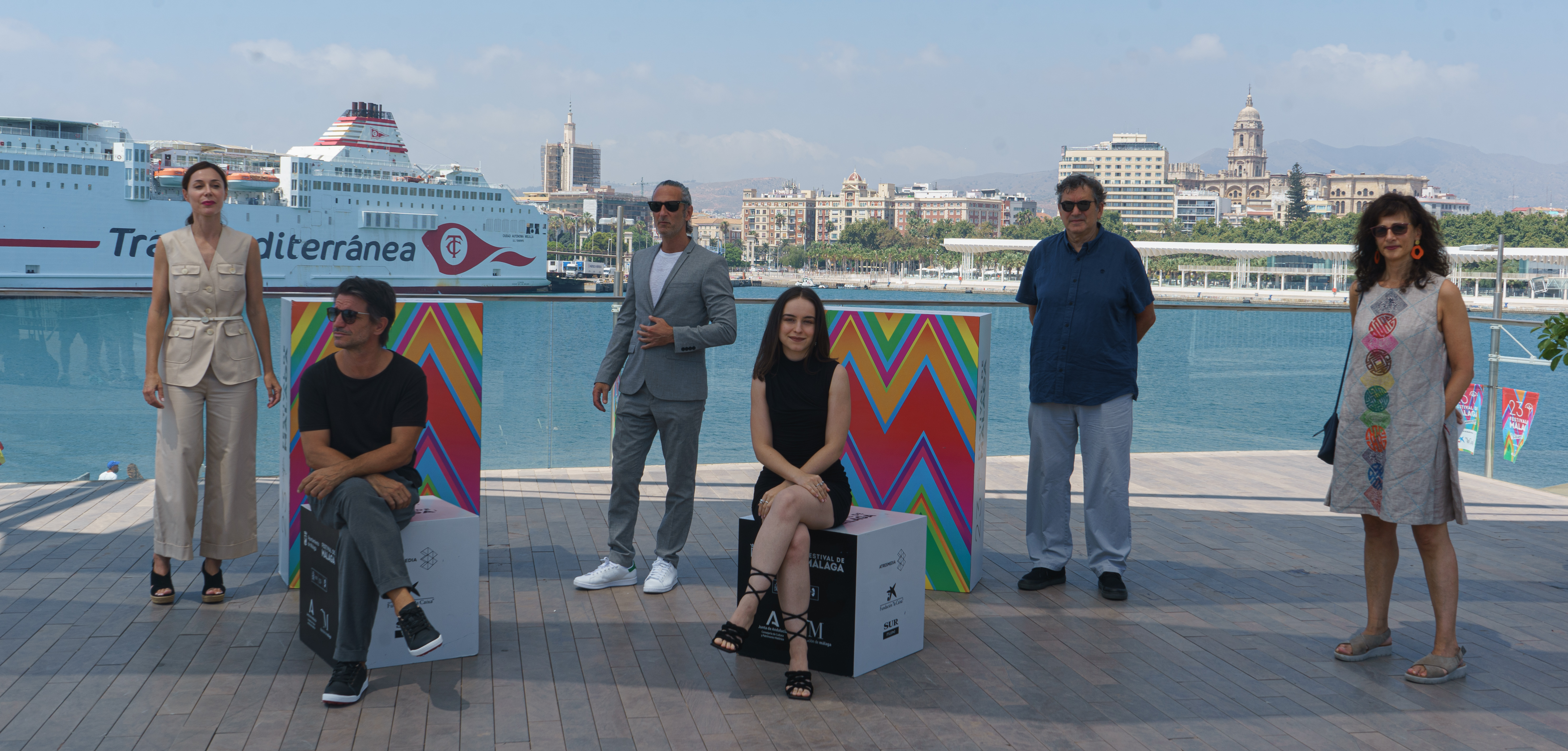
Crew and cast members attending a photocall during the Málaga Film Festival (from left to right: Díaz, Mañas, Alterio, Amyach, Herrero, Besuievsky)

The film was presented on 23 August 2020 at the 23rd Málaga Film Festival's main competition. Distributed by DeAPlaneta, it was theatrically released in Spain on 11 September 2020.

== Reception ==
Desirée de Fez of Fotogramas rated the film 3 out of 5 stars, considering that it works its worst when portraying the characters' relationships with art, but it works better in its affective dimension, with Mañas proposing "solid" characters in the latter regard, describing human relationships with clarity, allowing himself for certain escapes into the extravagant.

Marta Medina of El Confidencial scored 3 out of 5 stars, writing that the film is "a plea in favor of bohemia, insurrection, heterogeneity", "a project without excessive pretensions, but with a lot of frankness".

Beatriz Martínez of El Periódico de Catalunya rated 2 out of 5 stars, deeming the film to be "somewhat dated", featuring "an enormous deal of self-indulgence" when outlining the characters and their actions, also assessing that, positive and luminous tone notwithstanding, the film is dragged by the "constant need to be giving life lessons".

Sergio F. Pinilla of Cinemanía rated 3½ out of 5 stars, writing that the film features a "brilliant first act", "illuminated by the warm and enigmatic presence of actress Magüi Mira", which is followed by a part displaying rather conventional elements, presumably more connected to the autobiographical side of the screenplay, underpinning the film to be a "comforting road movie with the duende of the diva Magüi Mira".

== Accolades ==
| Year | Award | Category | Nominee(s) | Result | Ref. |
|---|---|---|---|---|---|
| 2020 | 3rd Valencian Audiovisual Awards | Best Supporting Actress | Magüi Mira | Nominated | |
| 2021 | 76th CEC Medals | Best New Actress | Gala Amyach | Nominated | |
| 2021 | 35th Goya Awards | Best Actor | Ernesto Alterio | Nominated | |

== See also ==
- List of Spanish films of 2020
