= Rest in Peace (film) =

- Promotional release poster
- Spanish: Descansar en paz
- Directed by: Sebastián Borensztein
- Screenplay by: Marcos Osorio Vidal; Sebastián Borensztein
- Based on: Descansar en paz: ¿nunca soñaste con dejar todo y empezar de nuevo? by Martín Baintrub
- Produced by: Ezequiel Crupnicoff; Federico Posternak; Ricardo Darín; Chino Darín
- Starring: Joaquín Furriel; Griselda Siciliani; Gabriel Goity
- Cinematography: Rodrigo Pulpeiro
- Edited by: Alejandro Carrillo Penovi
- Music by: Federico Jusid
- Production companies: Kenya Films; Benteveo Producciones
- Distributed by: Netflix
- Release dates: 7 March 2024 (Málaga); 21 March 2024 (Argentina)
- Country: Argentina
- Language: Spanish

Rest in Peace (Spanish: Descansar en paz) is a 2024 Argentine thriller film directed by Sebastián Borensztein which stars Joaquín Furriel, Griselda Siciliani, and Gabriel Goity.

== Plot ==
The plot follows Sergio Dayán, a debt-ridden man who takes advantage of the 1994 AMIA bombing, as he is presumed dead in the explosion, to disappear and start off a new life in Paraguay, leaving everything behind. In time, he is tempted to return to learn of his family's plight.

== Cast ==
- Joaquín Furriel as Sergio Dayán
- Griselda Siciliani as Estela
- Gabriel Goity as Hugo Brenner
- Lali González as Ilu
- Raúl Daumas
- Alicia Guerra
- Luciano Borges as Raúl
- Ernesto Rowe as Diego
- Liz Burnette as Beatrice
- Ariel López

== Production ==
The film is a Kenya Films and Benteveo Producciones production.

== Release ==
The film was presented at the 27th Málaga Film Festival on 7 March 2024. It screened in select Argentine theatres on 21 March 2024. It debuted on Netflix on 27 March 2024.

== Reception ==
On the review aggregator website Rotten Tomatoes, 100% of 5 critics' reviews are positive, with an average rating of 6.7/10.

Natalia Trzenko of La Nación gave the film a 'good' rating, writing that it "stands out for the performances of the cast led by Furriel and Siciliani".

== Accolades ==
Year	Award	Category	Nominee(s)	Result	Ref.
2024	27th Málaga Film Festival	Silver Biznaga for Best Actor	Joaquín Furriel	Won	
2024	27th Málaga Film Festival	Silver Biznaga for Best Supporting Actor	Gabriel Goity	Won	

== See also ==
- List of Argentine films of 2024
