= Karnawal (film) =

- Theatrical release poster
- Directed by: Juan Pablo Félix
- Written by: Juan Pablo Félix
- Produced by: Edson Sidonie
- Starring: Alfredo Castro; Martín López Lacci; Mónica Lairana; Diego Cremonesi
- Cinematography: Ramiro Civita
- Edited by: Eduardo Serrano; Luz López Mañe
- Music by: Leonardo Martinelli
- Production companies: Bikini Films; 3 Moinhos Produções Artísticas; Picardia Films; Phototaxia Pictures; Londra Films P&D
- Distributed by: Cine Tren
- Release dates: March 21, 2020 (Toulouse); September 23, 2021 (Argentina)
- Running time: 97 minutes
- Countries: Argentina; Bolivia; Brazil; Chile; Mexico; Norway
- Language: Spanish

Karnawal is a 2020 coming-of-age drama film written and directed by Juan Pablo Félix in his directorial debut. It stars Alfredo Castro, Martín López Lacci, Mónica Lairana and Diego Cremonesi. It tells the story of a teenager who is reunited with his father and together they embark on a journey, where truths that they would prefer not to know come to light and they find themselves involved in critical situations. It is a co-production between Argentina, Bolivia, Brazil, Chile, Mexico and Norway.

Karnawal was the film that received the most nominations at the 16th Sur Awards with a total of fourteen nominations, of which it won 8 awards, including "Best Film", "Best Director" and "Best Original Screenplay". In the 9th Platino Awards, he received the award for "Best Ibero-American Debut Film" and for "Best Supporting Actor" (for Castro).

The film was named on the shortlist for Chilean's entry for the Academy Award for Best International Feature Film at the 95th Academy Awards, but it was not selected.

== Synopsis ==
"Cabra" is a teenager who lives with his mother and her partner in northern Argentina, where he dances in malambo competitions. However, one day he unexpectedly receives a visit from his biological father, a con man who recently got out of jail and invites them to embark on a trip, whose purpose brings with it ulterior motives that Cabra and his mother are not expecting.

== Cast ==
- Alfredo Castro as "El Corto"
- Martin López Lacci as "Cabra"
- Mónica Lairana as Rosario
- Diego Cremonesi as Eusebio
- Adrián Fondari as "Tucumano"
- Sergio Prina as "Panther"
- José Luis Arias as Pérez Varela
- Ángel Apolonio Cruz as Tero Agüero
- Fernando Lamas Ventura as Álvaro

== Release ==
Karnawal had its world premiere on March 21, 2020, at the Toulouse Latin American Film Festival and then toured other festivals, where it won several awards. In Argentine theaters it had its premiere on September 23, 2021, under the distribution of Cine Tren.

== Reception ==
=== Critical reception ===
On the website Todas las críticas has a 74% approval rating based on 14 reviews. Ezequiel Boetti from the website Otros cines awarded the film 3 1/2 stars, stating that "the result is a serene film". For his part, Diego Brodersen from the newspaper Página 12 gave the film a rating of 6 points, highlighting the performances of Castro, Lairana and Cremonesi, as well as Félix's work as a director, saying that "he knows how to alternate the most general shots with the details of action and reaction of the actors".

Fernando Brenner from Escribiendo cine praised Félix's work, assuring that it is an "auspicious debut", in which "he is very clear about what he wants to tell and show". On the other hand, Daniel Álvarez from La butaca valued the script, stating that "the dialogue is precise and does not give many resolutions to the plot since the objective is to reach the mission of the protagonist, so the backgrounds will be in charge of us". Mario Betteo of Cine argentino hoy highlighted López Lacci's performance, describing it as a "splendid find".

=== Accolades ===
Year	Award / Festival	Category	Recipient	Result	Ref.
2020	Toulouse Latin American Film Festival	Films in Progress	Karnawal	Won	
2020	Guadalajara International Film Festival	Best Director	Juan Pablo Félix	Won	
2020	Guadalajara International Film Festival	Best Actor	Alfredo Castro	Won	
2021	Toulouse Latin American Film Festival	Special Mention – Interpretation	Alfredo Castro	Won	
2021	24th Málaga Film Festival	Golden Biznaga for Best Ibero-American Film	Karnawal	Won	
2021	24th Málaga Film Festival	Silver Biznaga for Best Supporting Actor	Alfredo Castro	Won	
2021	Santiago International Film Festival	Best Film	Karnawal	Won	
2021	Santiago International Film Festival	Best Actor	Martin López Lacci	Won	
2021	Viña del Mar International Film Festival	Special Mention	Karnawal	Won	
2021	Viña del Mar International Film Festival	Premio del Público	Karnawal	Won	
2021	Tofifest International Film Festival	Special Mention	Karnawal	Won	
2021	Aubagne International Film Festival	Best Music	Leonardo Martinelli	Won	
2021	Almería Western Film Festival	Best Film – Audience Award	Karnawal	Won	
2021	Argentine Academy of Cinematography Arts and Sciences Awards	Best Film	Karnawal	Won	
2021	Argentine Academy of Cinematography Arts and Sciences Awards	Best New Film	Karnawal	Won	
2021	Argentine Academy of Cinematography Arts and Sciences Awards	Best Director	Juan Pablo Félix	Won	
2021	Argentine Academy of Cinematography Arts and Sciences Awards	Best Actor	Martín López Lacci	Nominated	
2021	Argentine Academy of Cinematography Arts and Sciences Awards	Best Supporting Actress	Mónica Lairana	Won	
2021	Argentine Academy of Cinematography Arts and Sciences Awards	Best Supporting Actor	Alfredo Castro	Won	
2021	Argentine Academy of Cinematography Arts and Sciences Awards	Best Supporting Actor	Diego Cremonesi	Nominated	
2021	Argentine Academy of Cinematography Arts and Sciences Awards	Best New Actor	Martín López Lacci	Won	
2021	Argentine Academy of Cinematography Arts and Sciences Awards	Best Original Screenplay	Juan Pablo Félix	Won	
2021	Argentine Academy of Cinematography Arts and Sciences Awards	Best Cinematography	Ramiro Civita	Nominated	
2021	Argentine Academy of Cinematography Arts and Sciences Awards	Best Editing	Luz López Mañe & Eduardo Serrano	Nominated	
2021	Argentine Academy of Cinematography Arts and Sciences Awards	Best Art Direction	Daniela Villela	Nominated	
2021	Argentine Academy of Cinematography Arts and Sciences Awards	Best Sound	Lena Esquenazi	Nominated	
2021	Argentine Academy of Cinematography Arts and Sciences Awards	Best Original Music	Leonardo Martinelli	Won	
2022	Platino Awards	Best Ibero-American Debut Film	Karnawal	Won	
2022	Platino Awards	Best Supporting Actor	Alfredo Castro	Won	
2022	Argentores Awards	Best Original Screenplay	Juan Pablo Félix	Won	
2022	Silver Condor Award	Best Film	Karnawal	Nominated	
2022	Silver Condor Award	Best First Film	Karnawal	Won	
2022	Silver Condor Award	Best Supporting Actress	Mónica Lairana	Won	
2022	Silver Condor Award	Best Supporting Actor	Alfredo Castro	Won	
2022	Silver Condor Award	Best Supporting Actor	Diego Cremonesi	Nominated	
2022	Silver Condor Award	Best Newcomer (Male)	Martín López Lacci	Nominated	
2022	Silver Condor Award	Best Original Screenplay	Juan Pablo Félix	Nominated	
2022	Silver Condor Award	Best Cinematography	Ramiro Civita	Nominated	
2022	Silver Condor Award	Best Original Music	Leonardo Martinelli	Nominated	
2022	Silver Condor Award	Best Costume Design	Regina Calvo & Gabriela Varela Laciar	Won	
2022	Silver Condor Award	Best Art Direction	Daniela Villela	Nominated	
2022	Silver Condor Award	Best Makeup and Characterization	Nancy Marignac	Nominated	
