= Mateo (2014 film) =

2014 film

- Film poster
- Directed by: Maria Gamboa
- Written by: Maria Gamboa
- Starring: Carlos Hernández
- Release date: 31 May 2014 (Czech Republic)
- Running time: 86 minutes
- Country: Colombia
- Language: Spanish

Mateo is a 2014 Colombian drama film directed by Maria Gamboa and starring Carlos Hernández. The Spanish-language film was selected as the Colombian entry for the Best Foreign Language Film at the 87th Academy Awards, but was not nominated.

== Cast ==
- Carlos Hernández
- Felipe Botero
- Samuel Lazcano

== See also ==
- List of submissions to the 87th Academy Awards for Best Foreign Language Film
- List of Colombian submissions for the Academy Award for Best Foreign Language Film
