= Historias para no dormir =

- Created by: Narciso Ibáñez Serrador
- Written by: Narciso Ibáñez Serrador
- Directed by: Narciso Ibáñez Serrador
- Country of origin: Spain
- Original language: Spanish
- No. of seasons: 3
- No. of episodes: 29

Production
- Production company: Televisión Española

Original release
- Network: TVE1
- Release: February 4, 1966 – September 27, 1982

Related
- Historias para no dormir (2021)

Historias para no dormir (transl. Tales to Keep You Awake) is a Spanish horror anthology television series written and directed by Narciso Ibáñez Serrador, produced by Televisión Española and broadcast on its flagship Primera Cadena network from 1966 to 1982.

== History ==
This series marked Narciso Ibáñez Serrador's rise to fame. He had already been working with TVE since 1963, directing several previous series like Estudio 3 and Mañana puede ser verdad, but the success of this series made him a household name in Spain, as it covered a genre almost entirely unexplored in Spanish cinema and television at the time.

The first season was started with the chapter titled El cumpleaños ("The birthday") on February 4, 1966. It was the only chapter shot on 16mm film; the rest of the series was produced on videotape. It was an adaptation of a tale by Fredric Brown. The rest of the series saw original stories written by Serrador, like La alarma ("The Alarm"), or adapted screenplays from tales by Ray Bradbury, Edgar Allan Poe and others, in chapters like La Mano ("Demon with a Glass Hand"), La espera ("The Waiting Time"), El cohete ("The rocket") or El pacto ("The Deal"), the last one adapted from Poe's "The Facts in the Case of M. Valdemar". Although the most important chapter of the first season was El asfalto ("The Asphalt"), winner of the Golden Nymph for the best script on the Monte-Carlo Television Festival. It was the first international prize ever won by Televisión Española.

The second season was broadcast from 1967 to 1968 and it only had 8 episodes: La pesadilla ("The Nightmare"), La zarpa ("The Paw", version of W. W. Jacobs' "The Monkey's Paw"), El vidente ("The Seer"), El regreso ("The Return"), El cuervo ("The Raven", special episode dedicated to Edgard Allan Poe's biography), La promesa ("The Promise"), La casa ("The House") and El transplante ("The Transplant"). The series would be abandoned when Ibáñez Serrador started filming his first full-length feature film La residencia.

After the end of the second season, Ibáñez Serrador planned a new series which would have been titled Historias para la noche (Tales for the Night) which would contain deeper, more intellectual tales. A pilot episode was made in 1970, but it was not picked up. Therefore, he made in 1972 a special Historias para no dormir episode titled El lobo ("The Wolf"). In 1974, he would film another special broadcast, the first one in color, titled El televisor ("The TV set"). Then with the success of Un, dos, tres... responda otra vez and his second feature film, Who Can Kill a Child?, he would not get back to Historias para no dormir for years.

In 1982, Serrador produced the third and final official season of Historias para no dormir, which would only contain four color episodes; Freddy, El caso del señor Valdemar (remake of season 1's El pacto ("The Deal"), with the same actors reprising their original roles), El fin empezó ayer ("The End Began Yesterday", remake of a chapter from a previous series, Mañana puede ser verdad) and El trapero ("The Junkman"). Due to low budgets and a rushed shooting schedule, the master videotapes suffered from visual damage, and the season was ultimately not a success.

In 2000, a new season of Historias para no dormir was announced, and as a preview, El televisor was rebroadcast with a new introduction by Chicho. That preview was the only thing that was known from that season, since months and years went by and the project was never made. Months later, on June 8, 2001, in an interview in the Spanish program Versión española which was to broadcast his movie Who Can Kill A Child?, Chicho said that the project was cancelled because he wanted new directors for each of the episodes, because he did not want to direct all the episodes like he did in the past. Since he could not find directors interested in the project, he cancelled the season.

The series was released on DVD in Spain in a six-disc set with new introductions by Serrador. Later, in 2008 another set with two more discs was released. The American cult film distributor Severin Films licensed the series for distribution in North America, releasing the complete series on Blu-ray in October 2022 with English subtitles.

In 2005, as an attempt to relaunch the idea, a series of TV movies was shot under the title Películas para no dormir (Films to Keep You Awake). These TV movies were produced by Telecinco, directed by renowned directors such as Mateo Gil, Jaume Balagueró, Paco Plaza, Enrique Urbizu or Álex de la Iglesia and coordinated by Narciso Ibáñez Serrador himself, who also directed one of the movies, titled La culpa (Blame).

In 2021, four remakes of earlier episodes were made for Amazon Prime Video and TVE. The stories were La broma by Rodrigo Cortés, El doble by Rodrigo Sorogoyen, Freddy by Paco Plaza and El asfalto by Paula Ortiz. TVE broadcast the series around Halloween 2022 within Versión española.

In March 2022, a second season of remakes was announced by Amazon Prime Video. They were published on 27 October 2022. The episodes were El transplante by Salvador Calvo, El televisor by Jaume Balagueró, La pesadilla by Alice Waddington and La alarma by Nacho Vigalondo.

== Awards ==
- Golden Nymph to best script in the Monte-Carlo Television Festival 1967 for El asfalto.
- Critics Award to best foreign program in the Buenos Aires Festival.
- Ondas Award 1969 to Narciso Ibáñez Serrador as Best Author

== Películas para no dormir series ==
Movie	Director	Cast	TV premiere
La habitación del niño	Álex de la Iglesia	Javier Gutiérrez, Leonor Watling, Sancho Gracia, María Asquerino, Terele Pávez, Eulalia Ramón, Cesáreo Estébanez, Gracia Olayo, Asunción Balaguer, Antonio Dechent	12.01.2007
Para entrar a vivir	Jaume Balagueró	Macarena Gómez, Nuria González, Adrià Collado, Ruth Díaz	19.01.2007
La culpa	Narciso Ibáñez Serrador	Nieve de Medina, Montse Mostaza, Elena de Frutos, Alejandra Lorenzo, Mariana Cordero	27.09.2009
Cuento de Navidad	Paco Plaza	Maru Valdivieso, Christian Casas, Roger Babià, Daniel Casadellà, Pau Poch, Ivana Baquero, Elsa Pataky, Loquillo	25.10.2009
Adivina quién soy	Enrique Urbizu	Goya Toledo, Nerea Inchausti, José María Pou, Aitor Mazo, Eduard Farelo	25.10.2009
Regreso a Moira	Mateo Gil	Juan José Ballesta, Natalia Millán, Jordi Dauder, Miguel Rellán, José Ángel Egido, David Arnanz, Victoria Mora	27.09.2009
