= Jorge Motos =

Spanish actor (born 1999)

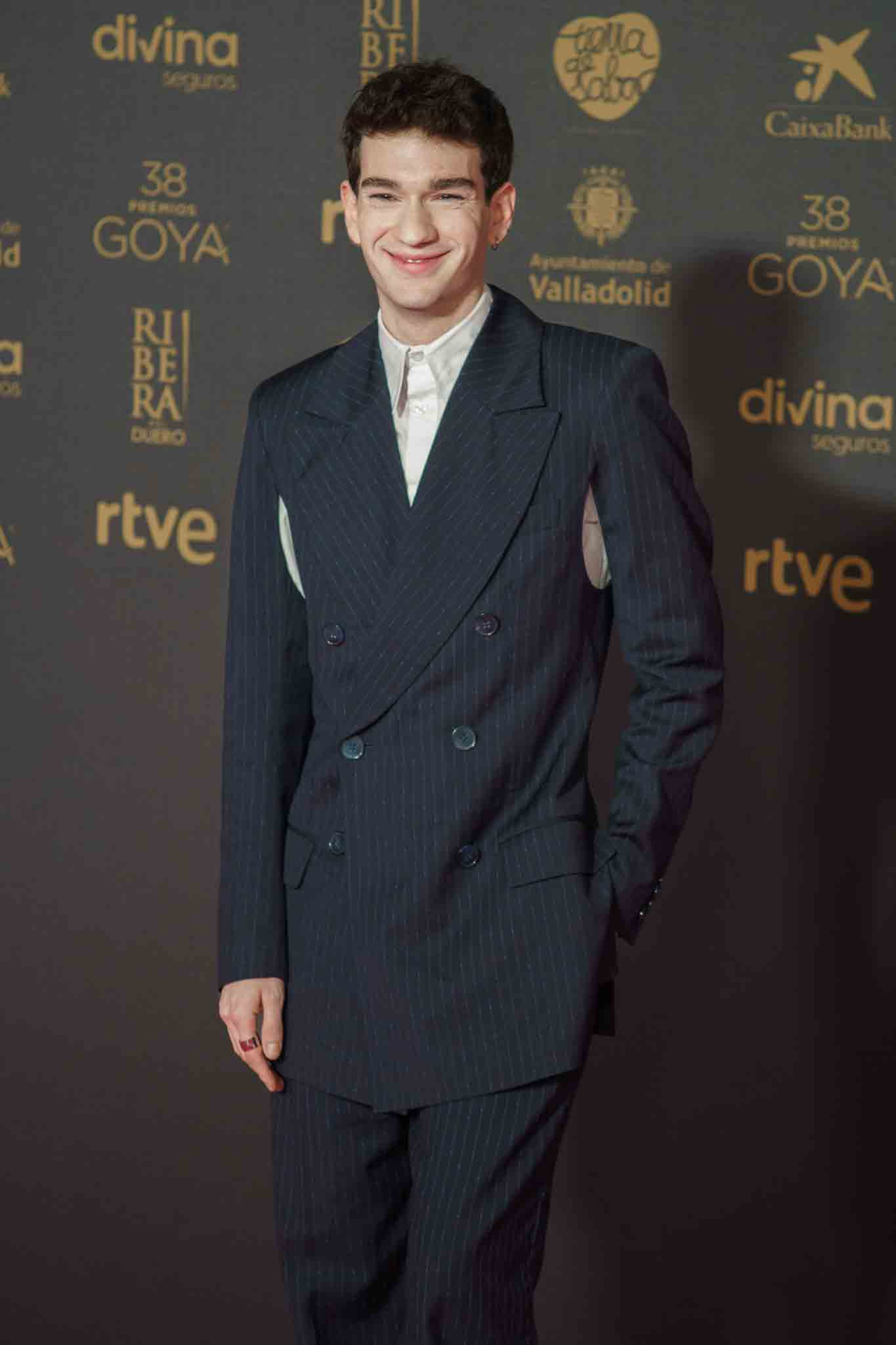
- Motos in 2024
- Born: 27 May 1999; Valencia, Spain
- Occupation: Actor
- Years active: 2016-present

Jorge Motos (born 27 May 1999) is a Spanish actor, best known for his leading role in the film Lucas (2021), for which he received the Berlanga Award for Best Actor and the Málaga Film Festival Best Actor Award, and was further nominated for the Goya Award for Best New Actor at the 36th Goya Awards. He has previously starred in the television series Si fueras tú (2017), La caza. Tramuntana (2021), and Feria: The Darkest Light (2022).

== Biography ==
Motos was born on 27 May 1999 in Valencia, Spain. He studied at the Valencia Actor's School for 8 years. He began his career with roles in various television series, first gaining recognition for playing the role of Hugo in the Playz streaming series Si fueras tú, in 2017. In January 2021, he had a recurring role in the second season of La caza. Tramuntana.

In 2021, he starred in the film Lucas, directed by Alex Montoya, for which he gained widespread recognition. For his work in the film, he received the Berlanga Award for Best Actor and the Málaga Film Festival Best Actor Award, and was nominated for Goya Award for Best New Actor at the 36th Goya Awards and for Best Actor at the CEC Awards. In January 2022, he starred in the Netflix original series Feria: The Darkest Light.

== Filmography ==
=== Films ===
Year	Title	Director	Role	Notes
2016	La madre	Alberto Morais	Friend	
2017	Amar	Esteban Crespo	Brother Charles	
2020	La vida de un secreto	Miguel Angel Font Bisier	Daniel	
2021	Lucas	Alex Montoya	Lucas	
2021	Con mis ojos	Ines Pintor and Pablo Santidrián	Dan	Short film
2023	Tú no eres yo (You Are Not Me)	Marisa Crespo Abril and Moises Romera Perez	Saúl	
2024	El aspirante (Fraternity)		Dani	

=== Television ===
Year	Title	Channel	Role	Notes
2016	Centro médico	La 1	Child	1 episode
2017	Cuéntame cómo pasó	La 1	Zangolotine	1 episode
2017	Si fueras tú	La 1	Hugo Molina	8 episodes
2018	La Vall	À Punt	Marc Revert	13 episodes
2018–2019	Más de 100 mentiras	Flooxer	Allan	11 episodes
2019	Èxode, de la batalla a la frontera	TV3	Soldier	TV movie
2020	Mercado Central	La 1	Beltran	10 episodes
2021	La caza. Tramuntana	La 1	Daniel Coll	6 episodes
2021	The Neighbor	Netflix	Kid	1 episode
2022	Feria:The Darkest Light	Netflix	Chisco	8 episodes
2022	Our Only Chance	Disney+	Christian	5 episodes
