= Catalina Sopelana =

Spanish actress (born 1992)

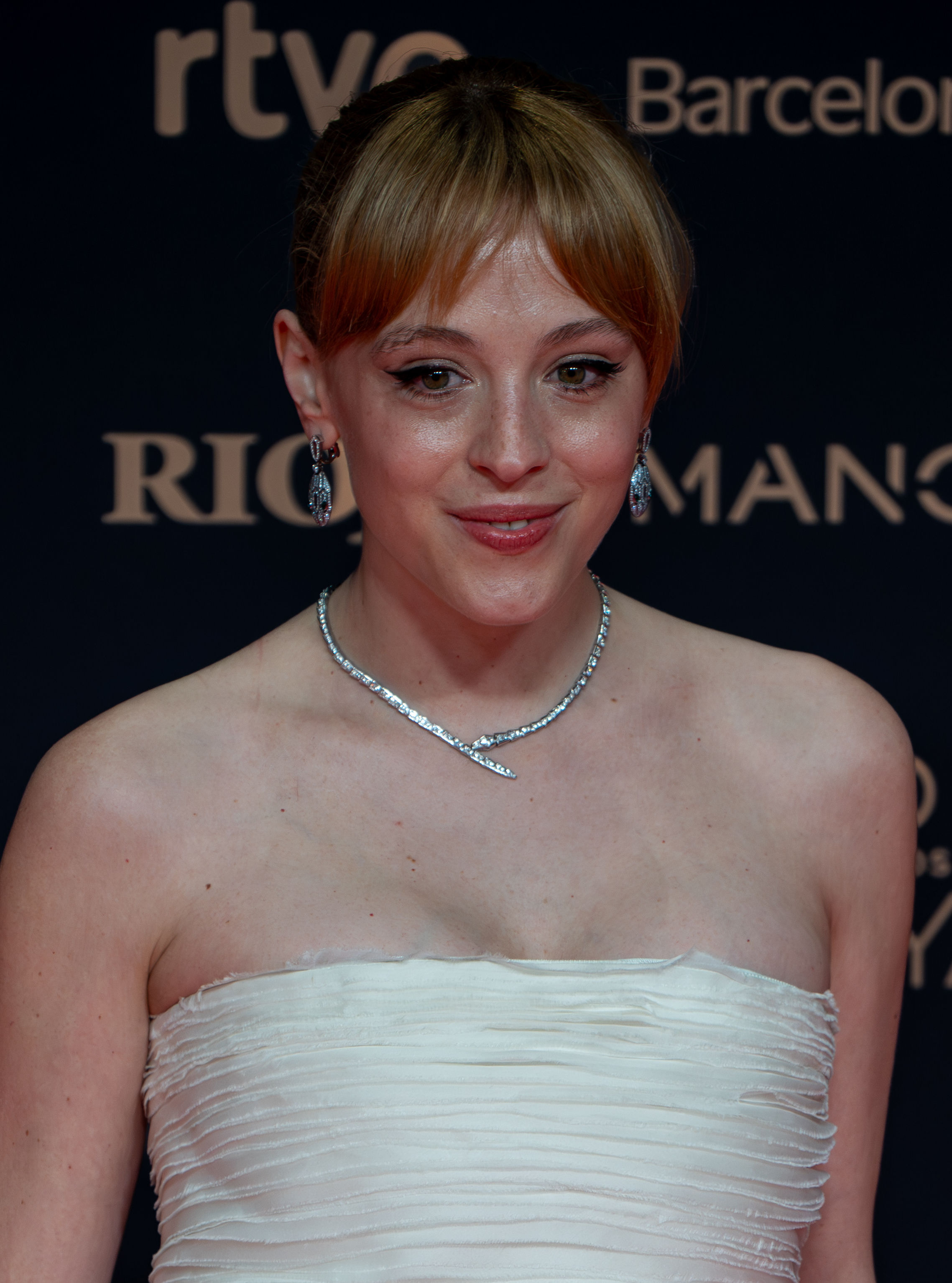
- Sopelana in 2026
- Born: 30 October 1992 (age 33); Madrid, Spain
- Occupation: Actress

Catalina Sopelana (born 1992) is a Spanish actress.

== Life and career ==
Born on 30 October 1992 in Madrid, she earned a degree in Psychology, deciding to join an amateur theatre group in her senior year. She's later trained her acting chops at Juan Carlos Corazza's attelier. She made her feature film debut in Carlos Vermut's Quién te cantará (2018). After appearing in television series such as Velvet Colección, Matadero, Centro médico, and Inhibidos, her portrayal of Julia in Netflix superhero comedy series The Neighbor (2019–2021) advanced her career. She starred as "empowered" gig worker Clau in Playz webseries Riders. She also appeared in films Outlaws (2021), Manticore (2022), and Prison 77 (2022), and joined the cast of Julio Medem's Minotauro. Picasso y las mujeres del Guernica to portray Marie-Thérèse Walter. (Note: As of 2025, the project is in post-production limbo.) She played the girfriend of Lali Espósito's Wendy in the last season of action thriller series Sky Rojo, aired in 2023.

Her supporting performance in The Blue Star portraying a friend of rock musician Mauricio Aznar (2023) earned her an Actors and Actresses Union Award nomination for Best Film Female Performance in a Minor Role. In season four of crime series Wrong Side of the Tracks, Sopelana portrayed unexperienced yet ambitious police agent Camila. Also in 2024, she featured in university-set psychological thriller Fraternity, and had a minor role in the television series I, Addict. In 2025, she starred opposite to Álvaro Rico and Cecilia Suárez in the romantic thriller series The Gardener (2025), portraying "sweet and kind" pre-school teacher Violeta. She also wrapped shooting El cuco de cristal, another Netflix thriller series in which she played the protagonist, a young doctor who, upon receiving a heart transplant, digs into the identity of the donor in the countryside.

== Filmography ==
=== Film ===
Year	Title	Role	Notes	Ref.
2018	Quién te cantará	Diana	Feature film debut	
2021	Las leyes de la frontera (Outlaws)	Paqui		
2022	Mantícora (Manticore)			
2022	Modelo 77 (Prison 77)	Lucía		
2023	La estrella azul (The Blue Star)	Mara		
2024	El aspirante (Fraternity)	Lau		
2025	Que vienen los perros			

=== Television ===
Year	Title	Role	Notes	Ref.
2019–21	El vecino (The Neighbor)	Julia		
2021	Riders	Clau		
2022	Sentimos las molestias	Laura		
2023	Sky Rojo	Greta	Introduced in season 3	
2024	Entrevías (Wrong Side of the Tracks)	Camila		
2024	Yo, adicto (I, Addict)			
2025	El jardinero (The Gardener)	Violeta		
2026	El cuco de cristal	Clara Merlo		
