= Juan José Plans =

Juan José Plans Martínez (February 28, 1943, Gijón, Asturias - February 24, 2014, Gijón, Asturias) was a Spanish writer, journalist, and radio and television announcer. He specialized as a writer in fantasy, horror, and science fiction, and published several collections of short stories and several radio and TV adaptations of classics in these genres. He was the author of nearly forty books and is on over thirty national and international anthologies, which have been translated into Portuguese, Polish, French, Russian and English.

His novel El juego de los niños (roughly meaning Children's Game) has been adapted for film twice: first as Narciso Ibáñez Serrador's Who Can Kill a Child? and later as Come Out and Play by Makinov.

Of the asociación jovellanista, he has written biographies of Gaspar Melchor de Jovellanos and Alejandro Casona.

He was the father of painter Edgar Plans Pérez (b. 1977, in Madrid) who is author of the 2009 Feria Internacional de Muestras de Asturias (Asturias International Trade Fair) poster.

== Career ==
Plans started his career in the press, in collaboration with Gijón's El Comercio and the Oviedo provincial press. In 1965, he moved to Madrid. There he began working at Spanish National Radio, as editor of La Estafeta Literaria and as editorial adviser of El Basilisco and Nickel Odeón. He led the Centro Territorial de TVE (Spanish Television Regional Headquarters) in Asturias, from 1984 to 1988, and also the Gijón International Film Festival.

He was the Spain director of the monthly magazine Lui.

He collaborated in the cultural supplement of La Nueva España, an Oviedo periodical, and picked up some of the articles from Puzzle 90 and Puzzle 91, 1990 through 1991. He presented, between 1994 and 2003, the radio shows Sobrenatural and Historias, on Spanish National Radio.

He has been awarded the National Theater Prize. He received the 1972 Premio Nacional de Guion Radiofónico (National Radio Broadcasting Script Prize) for Ventana al futuro and the Ondas Awards of 1982 for España y los españoles, both programs of Spanish National Radio. He obtained the Premio de las Letras de Asturias (Asturias Letters Prize) in 2010.

== Works ==
- Alejandro Casona. Juego biográfico dividido en una raíz y tres árboles, 1965 and 1990 — biography of Alejandro Casona
- Las langostas, 1967
- Crónicas fantásticas, 1968
- La gran coronación, 1968
- Historia de la novela policiaca, 1970
- Los misterios del castillo, 1971
- El cadáver, 1973
- Paraíso Final, 1975
- La literatura de ciencia-ficción, Prensa española - Magisterio español, 1975
- El juego de los niños, 1976
- Babel Dos, 1979
- De noche, un sábado, 1979
- El último suelo, 1986
- Lobos, 1990
- Puzzle 90, Oviedo: Pentalfa. 1990 — articles
- Puzzle 91, Oviedo: Pentalfa. 1991 — articles
- Pasión de Drácula, Nickel Odeón Dos, 1993
- Cuentos crueles, 1995
- Jovellanos, 1996 — biography of Gaspar Melchor de Jovellanos
- La leyenda de Tsobu, 1996 — novel
- En busca de Sharon, 1997 — novel
- Cromos de películas, Nickel Odeon, 2003

=== Anthologies ===
- Rómar, Antonio; Mazo Agüero, Pablo, eds. (2010). Aquelarre: Antología del cuento de terror español actual. Madrid: Salto de Página. ISBN 978-84-15065-02-9. Horror stories by Alfredo Álamo, Matías Candeira, Santiago Eximeno, Cristina Fernández Cubas, David Jasso, José María Latorre, Alberto López Aroca, Lorenzo Luengo, Ángel Olgoso, Félix Palma, Pilar Pedraza, Juan José Plans, Miguel Puente, Marc R. Soto, Norberto Luis Romero, Care Santos, José Carlos Somoza, José María Tamparillas, David Torres, José Miguel Vilar-Bou and Marian Womack.

== See also ==
- Radio drama
