= Prunella Ransome =

British actress (1943–2002)

- Born: Prunella Jane Ransome; 18 January 1943; Croydon, Surrey, England
- Died: 4 March 2002 (aged 59); Norwich, Norfolk, England
- Education: Elmhurst Ballet School
- Occupation: Actress
- Years active: 1959–1999
- Children: 2

Prunella Jane Ransome (18 January 1943 – 4 March 2002) was an English actress, primarily active on television and in films.

== Early life ==
Ransome was born in Croydon, Surrey. From 1952 to 1958 she lived in Fareham, England, where her father, Jimmy Ransome, was headmaster of West Hill Park School. Ransome studied at Elmhurst School for Dance and began her performing career as a teenager.

== Career ==
Ransome made her West End debut in the 1961-62 musical Do Re Mi, followed by Oliver! She later spent five months singing at a cabaret in Athens, and upon returning to the UK worked delivering cars for a London automobile dealership. In 1965 she was cast in a Leatherhead production of the musical stage play The Matchgirls. Following that show's 1966 West End transfer, Ransome's performance drew the attention of a producer of the 1967 film Far from the Madding Crowd, with a screen test leading to her playing that film's second female lead and her performance earning her a Golden Globe Award nomination.

Ransome progressed in her film career playing the female lead in the 1969 film Alfred the Great. Her subsequent screen career, however, was focused almost exclusively on television, Ransome having debuted in that medium in the 1967 serialisation of Kenilworth. In the 1970s she had major multi-episode roles in three well-regarded TV drama series: Warship and A Horseman Riding By for the BBC, and Dangerous Knowledge for Southern Television. She also appeared in other TV series of the period, such as Man at the Top, episode "I’ll Do the Dirty Work", in 1970. That same year she appeared in the Granada TV series A Family at War, playing Dominique Bréhaut, the girlfriend of Philip Ashton during his posting to the Channel Islands. She appeared as Princess Alexandra in “The Ozerov Inheritance”, an episode of The Persuaders!, in 1972.

Ransome's rare film roles included the female leads in the western Man in the Wilderness (1971) and Narciso Ibáñez Serrador's Who Can Kill a Child?, a 1976 horror film which has become a cult favourite. She also played the female lead in the 5-part British-Italian co-production 1980 TV miniseries Seagull Island which was re-edited into the film The Secret of Seagull Island (1981). Ransome retired as a career actress following her participation in the 1984 television series Sorrell and Son, though she made occasional television guest appearances in the 1990s.

== Personal life ==
She had two daughters, Charlotte (born 1973) and Victoria (born 1975) and was aunt to Thomas Ransome. In 1980 Ransome relocated from London to Suffolk. She died of esophageal cancer (throat) in the Norfolk and Norwich Hospital, on Monday, 4 March 2002. Prunella was cremated at Earlham Crematorium on Saturday, 9 March 2002. However, her ashes were not laid to rest there, but were taken away by the funeral director in Norwich for private interment.

== Sources ==
The Pittsburgh Press October 1, 1968 p. 14.
