= Riders (TV series) =

- Genre: Comedy thriller; Dark comedy
- Created by: Javi Valera; Alejandro Alcaraz
- Screenplay by: Javi Valera; Alejandro Alcaraz
- Directed by: Beatriz Abad
- Starring: Ismael Abadal; Catalina Sopelana; Germán Alcarazu; Dayana Contreras
- Country of origin: Spain
- Original language: Spanish
- No. of seasons: 1
- No. of episodes: 7

Production
- Cinematography: Sandra Formatger
- Running time: 20 min (approx.)
- Production companies: RTVE; LACOproductora

Original release
- Network: playz
- Release: 12 May 2021

Riders is a Spanish comedy thriller streaming television series. Created and written by Javi Valera and Alejandro Alcaraz, it stars Ismael Abadal, Catalina Sopelana and Germán Alcarazu. It premiered on Playz in May 2021.

== Premise ==
The fiction—a mix of thriller, comedy and elements of social drama— starts with the homicide of a so-called rider working for 'Pillaloo' (a look-alike of delivery companies such as Glovo or Deliveroo). It then follows Axel, an aspiring video game programmer entering to work as home-delivery driver in order to pay for his brother's debts.

== Cast ==
- Ismael Abadal as Axel
- Catalina Sopelana as Clau
- Germán Alcarazu as Luk
- Dayana Contreras as Nancy
- Mario Alberto as Orlando
- Christian Mulas as Luismi
- Denzel Atteen as Jorge
- José Luis Barquero as Carlo
- María Alfonso Rosso as Lili
- Gabriel Guevara
- Sara Socas as Chica Riders
- Roi Méndez
- Carlos Right
- Alberto Casado & Rober Bodegas as reponedores
- Vicky Martín as Jefa empresa videojuegos.
- Itziar Castro
- Kike Pérez as Camarero Arepas
- Bruno Martín as Rider cuarentón

== Production and release ==
Produced by RTVE in collaboration with LACOproductora, Riders was created and written by Javi Valera and Alejandro Alcaraz, whereas it was directed by Beatriz Abad. Sandra Formatger worked as director of photography. Shooting began by September 2020 in Madrid. Consisting of 7 episodes, the first two episodes premiered on 12 May 2021 on Playz.

Series	Episodes	Originally released			Ref.
Series	Episodes	First released	Last released	Network	Ref.
1	7	12 May 2021	16 June 2021	playz	

No.	Title	Directed by	Original release date
1	"Pedido 001"	Beatriz Abad	12 May 2021
2	"Pedido 002"	Beatriz Abad	12 May 2021
3	"Pedido 003"	Beatriz Abad	19 May 2021
4	"Pedido 004"	Beatriz Abad	26 May 2021
5	"Pedido 005"	Beatriz Abad	2 June 2021
6	"Pedido 006"	Beatriz Abad	9 June 2021
7	"Pedido 007"	Beatriz Abad	16 June 2021

Best Direction by Carballo Interplay 2021
