= Si fueras tú =

2017 Spanish thriller television series

- Official poster
- Genre: Thriller; Teen drama
- Based on: Reservoir Hill
- Written by: Javier Olivares; Anaïs Schaaff; Javier Pascual
- Directed by: Joaquín Llamas
- Starring: María Pedraza; Óscar Casas; Nerea Elizalde; Lucía Díez; Jorge Motos
- Country of origin: Spain
- Original language: Spanish
- No. of seasons: 1
- No. of episodes: 8

Production
- Executive producer: Isabel Raventós
- Running time: c. 10–20 min
- Production companies: RTVE; Atomis Media

Original release
- Network: rtve.es/playz
- Release: 11 September – 30 October 2017

Si fueras tú is a Spanish thriller streaming television series starring María Pedraza, Óscar Casas, Nerea Elizalde, Lucía Díez and Jorge Motos that originally aired in 2017. Produced by RTVE in collaboration with Atomis Media, it consists of an adaptation of the New Zealand teen show Reservoir Hill.

== Premise ==
The starting point of the fiction concerns the arrival of Alba, a 17-year-old girl, to a new neighborhood. Adapting at her new school and in the neighborhood becomes all the more difficult because she has striking similarity to another girl, Cris, who disappeared half a year earlier.

== Cast ==
- María Pedraza as Alba Ruiz Alonso / Cristina Romero
- Óscar Casas as Rafael Castro
- Nerea Elizalde as Nerea Vidal
- Jorge Motos as Hugo Molina
- Lucía Díez as Rocío Sosa
- Adrià Collado as Miguel Alonso
- Juan Blanco as Alberto Blanco
- Ingrid Rubio as Sargento Lara
- Ruth Díaz as Carmen Valle
- Daniel Ibáñez as Dani Romero

== Production and release ==
Si fueras tú is an adaptation of the New Zealand series Reservoir Hill, and it was produced by RTVE in collaboration with Atomis Media. The screenplay was adapted by Javier Olivares, Anaïs Schaaff and Javier Pascual whereas the episodes were directed by Joaquín Llamas. Isabel Raventós was credited as executive producer. The series began shooting by August 2017 in Madrid. Except the 20-minute-long pilot episode, the rest of episodes do not reach a running time much longer than 10 minutes. The series was presented as a trans-media project where viewers could decide on the direction of the plot, and in which the production crew hence would face the challenge of quickly creating, shooting and wrapping each episodes in barely 5 days based on the audience's decisions. The pilot premiered on 11 September 2017. The broadcasting run ended on 30 October 2017. An 80-minute-long TV movie cut was broadcast on the RTVE's flagship free-to-air channel La 1 in December 2017. The release of the series served to promote the kickstart of the RTVE's streaming platform playz, which entered operation on 30 October 2017.

Series	Episodes	Originally released			Ref.
Series	Episodes	First released	Last released	Network	Ref.
1	8	11 September 2017	30 October 2017	rtve.es/playz	

No.	Title	Directed by	Original release date
1	"Capítulo 1"	Joaquín Llamas	11 September 2017
2	"Capítulo 2"	Joaquín Llamas	18 September 2017
3	"Capítulo 3"	Joaquín Llamas	25 September 2017
4	"Capítulo 4"	Joaquín Llamas	2 October 2017
5	"Capítulo 5"	Joaquín Llamas	9 October 2017
6	"Capítulo 6"	Joaquín Llamas	16 October 2017
7	"Capítulo 7"	Joaquín Llamas	23 October 2017
8	"Capítulo 8"	Joaquín Llamas	30 October 2017
