= You Are Not Me =

- Theatrical release poster
- Spanish: Tú no eres yo
- Directed by: Marisa Crespo; Moisés Romera
- Written by: Marisa Crespo; Moisés Romera
- Starring: Roser Tapias; Jorge Motos; Pilar Almería; Alfred Picó; Anna Kurikka
- Distributed by: Carácter Films
- Release dates: September 22, 2023 (Fantastic Fest); December 13, 2024 (Spain)
- Running time: 98 minutes
- Country: Spain
- Languages: Catalan; Spanish
- Box office: $6,912

You Are Not Me (Spanish: Tú no eres yo) is a 2023 Spanish thriller film written and directed by Marisa Crespo and Moisés Romera and starring Roser Tapias, Pilar Almeria and Anna Kurikka.

== Plot ==
Upon returning from abroad to her family home for Christmas with her girlfriend Gabi and their adopted baby Joao, Aitana faces a strange situation, as her parents have seemingly replaced her with a stranger.

== Cast ==
- Roser Tapias as Aitana
- Jorge Motos as Saúl
- Álvaro Báguena as Oriol
- Pilar Almería as Dori
- Pilar Martínez as Pepita
- Jonathan D. Mellor as Nicolás
- Anna Kurikka as Nadia
- Alfred Picó as Justo

== Production ==
Shooting locations included the provinces of Valencia and Castellón. It was shot primarily in Valencian (Catalan), featuring also dialogue in Spanish, Portuguese, English, French, and Persian.

== Release ==
For its world premiere, the film was scheduled for a September 22, 2023 screening at the Austin-based Fantastic Fest. In August 2024, it was announced that the U.S. distribution rights to the film were acquired by Doppelgänger Releasing. The film made its worldwide premiere at the 2023 Fantastic Fest. Then it was released in theaters and on digital in the United States on December 6, 2024.

Carácter distributed the film in Spain, scheduling a December 13, 2024 theatrical rollout. The distributor programmed the first "nudist" screenings in Spain.

== Reception ==
Zachary Lee of RogerEbert.com awarded the film two and a half stars out of four, declaring it as "one of the better feel-bad movies of this year's holidays, one that understands that family's embrace may be more suffocating than loving"

Chad Collins of Dread Central awarded the film four stars out of five summing it up as "one of the finest queer horror movies of the year" and "a gift to the Christmas horror canon".

Pere Vall of Fotogramas rated the film 3 out of 5 stars citing "the great scream queen Roser Tapias and Jorge Motos; its decided, brave and original bet on genre cinema in these times; [and] the much talked about scene of the collective nudity" as positive elements.

Carmen L. Lobo of La Razón rated the film 3 out of 5 stars, writing about how it "manages to maintain the tension; it is an interesting Christmas horror story".

== See also ==
- List of Spanish films of 2024
