= Come Out and Play (film) =

- Directed by: Makinov
- Screenplay by: Makinov
- Based on: El juego de los niños by Juan José Plans
- Produced by: Makinov
- Starring: Vinessa Shaw; Ebon Moss-Bachrach
- Cinematography: Makinov
- Edited by: Makinov
- Production company: Canana
- Distributed by: Videocine
- Release dates: 13 September 2012 (TIFF); 6 September 2013 (Mexico)
- Running time: 83 minutes
- Country: Mexico
- Languages: English; Spanish
- Budget: MXN$12 million (USD$940,531)
- Box office: $2,638

Come Out and Play is a 2012 Mexican horror film produced, shot, edited, written, and directed by Makinov. The film stars Vinessa Shaw and Ebon Moss-Bachrach. The movie is widely known for being a box office bomb, making US$2,638 on a MXN$12 million (US$940,531) budget.

== Plot ==
Beth (Vinessa Shaw) and Francis (Ebon Moss-Bachrach), a young married couple, are on holiday together when they venture to a beautiful, but highly remote island. Beth is pregnant and the two are hoping to enjoy their last vacation before their baby is born. When they arrive, they notice that while there are plenty of children present, the adults all seem to be missing. Initially attributing this to the after effects of a recent festival, they quickly realize something far more sinister is afoot. The two will face terror and unsettling difficult decisions in their quest to make it off the island alive.

It is a remake of Who Can Kill a Child? (aka Island of the Damned), a 1976 Spanish horror film based on a novel by Juan José Plans.

== Cast ==
- Vinessa Shaw as Beth
- Ebon Moss-Bachrach as Francis
- Daniel Giménez Cacho
- Gerardo Taracena
- Alejandra Álvarez
