= Alice Waddington =

Spanish film director (born 1990)

- Born: Irene Lago Clavero; July 31, 1990 (age 36); Bilbao, Basque Country, Spain
- Citizenship: Spanish
- Education: University of the Basque Country
- Occupation: Filmmaker
- Years active: 2010–present

Alice Waddington (born July 31, 1990) is a Spanish film director, writer, photographer and costume designer. Her directing style is rooted in heightened genre cinema, combining visceral action, psychological horror, and dark humor within stylized, character-driven worlds. Her work emphasizes physical storytelling, choreographed movement, and tonal control, allowing moments of surrealism to coexist with large-scale spectacle.

== Early life ==
Waddington was born Irene Lago Clavero on July 31, 1990, in Bilbao, Spain. Her father is a Catalan forensic psychiatrist and her mother a Galician teacher. She grew up in the then blue-collar San Mamés neighborhood of Bilbao.

Waddington adopted her stage name at sixteen, while assisting director of photography Quique López. At 18, she studied advertising at UPV-EHU University where she started capturing promotion stills and directing fashion films as a photographer for the Spanish editions of Harper's Bazaar, Neo2 and others.

Waddington currently lives and is based in Los Angeles.

== Career ==
After studying advertising at the public University of the Basque Country (UPV), Waddington worked for three years as an advertising creative, producer, and advertising video editor at agencies including Leo Burnett Iberia and Social Noise, also specializing as a digital storyboard artist.

In 2014, Waddington took a hiatus from advertising agency work to write and direct her first narrative short film, Disco Inferno (2015), with executive producer Yadira Ávalos. The 11-minute film received nominations at more than 60 international film festivals, including Palm Springs International ShortFest, Fantasia, Sitges (Noves Visions Short award), and Fantastic Fest. The film won Best Director at Fantastic Fest and the Silver Feature Film Project Award at the festival’s film market, leading to the development of Waddington’s debut feature Paradise Hills.

Waddington entered pre-production on her debut feature film, Paradise Hills, in 2017 with Spanish production company Nostromo Pictures. Written by Brian DeLeeuw and Nacho Vigalondo, the science-fiction thriller starred Emma Roberts, Awkwafina, Eiza González, Danielle Macdonald, Milla Jovovich, and Jeremy Irvine. The film premiered at the Sundance Film Festival in 2019, becoming the second Spanish debut feature ever selected by the festival, and went on to screen at more than twenty international genre festivals, including Fantasia, Sitges, and Mórbido.

In June 2019, it was announced that Waddington was developing her second feature film, Scarlet, from a script co-written with Kristen SaBerre, with Waddington also serving as executive producer. The project was developed at MGM/Orion and produced by Aggregate Entertainment.

In September 2021, Waddington was announced as director of the Netflix adaptation of the Dark Horse Entertainment comic series Dept. H, with a script by screenwriter T. S. Nowlin, known for The Maze Runner film series and Pacific Rim: Uprising.

In October 2022, Waddington premiered her first television episode at the Sitges Film Festival as part of Amazon Prime Video Spain’s revival of Historias para no Dormir. Her episode, La Pesadilla, was written with established Spanish showrunner Rocío Martínez Llano and is a remake of a 1967 story by legendary horror pioneer Chicho Ibáñez Serrador.

In 2023, Waddington and the Benson sisters sold an adaptation of a fantasy novel series, Witchlands, to a US studio, with Waddington attached to direct the project.

Waddington is also a co-writer and director on the segment Red Shoes for the 2026 feature-length horror anthology film Tales from the Woods, produced by Wayward Entertainment. The anthology includes segments directed by multiple filmmakers, including Benson & Moorhead.

In 2026, Waddington is attached to co-write and direct Luke Preston's novel "Anonymous Jane" for Addictive Pictures under its genre imprint Neotext.

== Social activism ==
Waddington is a proactive demander for sorority within the arts.

In the context of film, she has been vocal about the need for both more female-led and more diversely-cast films worldwide and about motivating young women to enroll into filmmaking programs.

== Personal life ==
Waddington is fluent in Spanish and English and conversational in Basque, French and Catalan.

== Filmography ==
=== Film ===
Year	Title	Director	Writer	Producer	Notes	Ref(s)
2015	Disco Inferno	Yes	Yes	Yadira Ávalos	Short film	Link
2019	Paradise Hills	Yes	Yes	Nostromo Pictures, Netflix Originals	Feature	Link
2022	"La pesadilla" (TV episode)	Yes	Yes	Amazon EU	Stories to Stay Awake (Season 2)	
2025-2026	Red Shoes	Yes	Yes	Wayward Entertainment	TV episode	

== Awards ==
=== Disco Inferno (2015) ===
Waddington's short film Disco Inferno was showcased at 63 genre and conventional film festivals globally, including Sitges, Fantastic Fest, and Palm Springs International ShortFest. The film received multiple awards, such as Best Short Film at Sitges and Fantastic Fest, and was qualified for the Academy Awards.

=== Paradise Hills (2019) ===
Waddington's debut feature film Paradise Hills premiered at the 2019 Sundance Film Festival and was screened at over 30 international festivals, including Sitges, Fantasia Film Festival, and Toronto After Dark. Prior to its release, the project won the Silver Award for Best Feature Project at Fantastic Fest in 2015. The film received various nominations, including Best Fantasy Film at the Saturn Awards and a nomination for Best New Director at the Goya Awards. It was also qualified for the Academy Awards.

=== La Pesadilla (2022) ===
The IP-based TV episode La Pesadilla was presented at the Sitges Film Festival in 2022 as part of its Midnight Series lineup. The episode earned critical acclaim for its unique blend of horror and social commentary.

=== Tales From the Woods (2025-2026) ===
Waddington directed the short segment Red Shoes for the anthology series Tales from the Woods, which was selected for Sitges Film Festival, Brooklyn Horror and Fantastic Fest.
