= Timecrimes =

2007 film by Nacho Vigalondo

- Promotional release poster
- Spanish: Los Cronocrímenes
- Directed by: Nacho Vigalondo
- Written by: Nacho Vigalondo
- Produced by: Eduardo Carneros; Javier Ibarretxe; Esteban Ibarretxe
- Starring: Karra Elejalde; Nacho Vigalondo; Candela Fernández; Bárbara Goenaga
- Cinematography: Flavio Martínez Labiano
- Edited by: Jose Luis Romeu
- Music by: Eugenio Mira
- Distributed by: Karbo Vantas Entertainment
- Release dates: 20 September 2007 (Fantastic Fest); 27 June 2008 (Spain)
- Running time: 92 minutes
- Country: Spain
- Language: Spanish
- Budget: $2.6 million
- Box office: $564,474

Timecrimes (Spanish: Los cronocrímenes) is a 2007 Spanish science-fiction thriller film written by, directed by, and featuring Nacho Vigalondo. The film stars Karra Elejalde as Héctor, a man who unwittingly becomes part of a causal loop and must stop his other selves from continuing to exist.

== Plot ==
In the Spanish countryside, a middle-aged man named Héctor and his wife Clara live in a home that they are renovating. Héctor scans the forest behind their house with binoculars and sees a young woman take off her T-shirt, exposing her breasts. When his wife goes shopping, he investigates and finds the woman on the ground, naked and unconscious. He is stabbed in the arm by a mysterious man with bloody bandages on his face. Fleeing and breaking into a mysterious nearby building, Héctor contacts a scientist by walkie-talkie, who warns him of the bandaged man and guides him to his location, promising safety. With the bandaged man just outside, the scientist convinces Héctor to hide inside a large mechanical device. When Héctor leaves the machine, he discovers that he has traveled approximately an hour back in time.

The scientist explains that the machine is an experimental time machine and refers to Héctor as "Héctor 2". The scientist tells Héctor 2 that they need to stay where they are and let events unfold. Despite the scientist's warning, Héctor 2 drives off in a car, passing a cyclist, who he recognizes as the woman Héctor 1 saw in the forest. Héctor 2 chases the woman, only to be run off the road by a van, cutting his head, which he wraps using the bandage from his arm wound. He then realizes the bandaged man from before is himself. The woman approaches to see if he is all right. Héctor 2 replicates events by making the woman undress in view of Héctor 1. When she runs away, Héctor 2 catches her, inadvertently knocking her out. Héctor 2 lays her out naked on the ground and then stabs Hector 1 in the arm when he arrives. The woman escapes.

Héctor 2 returns to his home, where he hears a scream and chases a woman through his house and onto the roof. When Héctor 2 attempts to grab her, she slips and falls to her death. Seeing the body from the roof, Héctor 2 is horrified, believing he has killed his own wife. Héctor 2 contacts the scientist over the walkie-talkie and convinces him to lure Héctor 1 to the lab with warnings that he is being pursued. Driving to the lab, Héctor 2 insists that he must travel back one more time, despite the scientist revealing that there is a Héctor 3, who told him he must stop Héctor 2 from doing just that.

After removing his bandages, Héctor 2 convinces the scientist to send him back several seconds before Héctor 2 initially appears. This causes him to become Héctor 3, who uses a van to run Héctor 2 off the road, but crashes as well, knocking himself out. Upon waking, Héctor 3 informs the scientist he has failed to stop Héctor 2. Héctor 3 encounters the woman again, startling her into screaming, though she does not recognize him as her assailant. Since Héctor 2 has heard her scream, Héctor 3 and the woman flee to Héctor's house. They become separated. Héctor 3 finds and hides his wife, then realizes what has to happen / will happen / has already happened. He finds the woman, cuts her ponytail off, gives her his wife's coat and tells her to hide upstairs. Héctor 2 chases her onto the roof. Héctor 3 sits on his lawn with his wife as Héctor 2 accidentally kills the woman, then drives off – heading back to the lab to become Héctor 3. Emergency vehicles are heard approaching in the distance.

== Cast ==
- Karra Elejalde as Héctor
  - Juan Inciarte as Occasional Héctor
- Candela Fernández as Clara
- Barbara Goenaga as the woman in the forest
- Nacho Vigalondo as the scientist

== Inspiration ==
In the documentary Future Shock! The Story of 2000AD, Nacho Vigalondo credits the comic magazine 2000 AD as the biggest influence on Timecrimes, particularly the Alan Moore and Dave Gibbons one-off "Chronocops" from #310 (1983).

== Music ==
The film's score was composed by Eugenio Mira. The film also uses the song "Picture This" by the American rock band Blondie, which director Vigalondo has stated he chose because he "love[s] the arrangement of the song and the chords. It's a happy song, but it's very sad and it's close to the movie".

== Release ==
The film premiered at Fantastic Fest in Austin, Texas, on 20 September 2007. It screened as the closing film of the Sitges Film Festival in October 2007. It had a theatrical release in Spain on 27 June 2008.

== Reception ==
=== Critical response ===
On Rotten Tomatoes, the film holds an approval rating of 90% based on 71 reviews, with a weighted average rating of 7/10. The site's critical consensus reads, "Timecrimes is a low-budget thriller that's well-crafted and loaded with dark humor and bizarre twists." The film also has a score of 68 out of 100 on Metacritic based on 15 critics indicating "generally favorable reviews".

Jeannette Catsoulis of The New York Times noted the role of female frontal nudity and fast-paced action in making a time-travel film with no special effects. She praised writer/director Nacho Vigalondo's "audacity" in being able to create "urgency and disorientation from the thinnest of air" despite the film's low budget and lack of special effects. Wesley Morris of The Boston Globe doubted whether Timecrimes actually makes sense but credited Vigalondo with making clever use of the time machine in order to allay the viewer's skepticism. Referring to the planned remake by director David Cronenberg, and alluding to Héctor's "human sequels", Morris concluded that Timecrimes "deserves a doppelganger". In a retrospective review, A. A. Dowd of The A.V. Club interpreted the film as an allegory about adultery, comparing Héctor's increasingly complex and confusing actions to those of someone lying to hide an affair.

=== Accolades ===
Year	Award	Category	Nominee(s)	Result	Ref.
2007	Fantastic Fest	Best Picture		Won	
2007	Fantastic Fest	Gold Medal of Jury Award Competition		Won	
2007	Fantastic Fest	Silver Medal of Audience Award Competition		Won	
2007	Trieste Science+Fiction Festival	Asteroide Award for Best International Sci-fi Feature Film		Won	
2009	64th CEC Medals	Best Original Screenplay	Nacho Vigalondo	Nominated	
2009	64th CEC Medals	Best Editing	José Luis Romeu	Nominated	
2009	64th CEC Medals	Newcomer Award	Nacho Vigalondo	Won	
2009	23rd Goya Awards	Best New Director	Nacho Vigalondo	Nominated	

== Remake ==
An English language remake was originally planned to happen with United Artists. However, the project never came into fruition and hit a deadline with no product. In 2011, the project was moved to DreamWorks with Steve Zaillian planning to write and produce.

== See also ==
- List of Spanish films of 2008
- List of films featuring time loops
- Temporal paradox
- Causality
