= Historia de la frivolidad =

- Genre: Television special
- Written by: Narciso Ibáñez Serrador; Jaime de Armiñán
- Directed by: Narciso Ibáñez Serrador
- Narrated by: Irene Gutiérrez Caba
- Composer: Augusto Algueró
- Country of origin: Spain
- Original language: Spanish

Production
- Producer: Juan Jesús Buhigas
- Running time: 41 min.
- Production company: Televisión Española

Original release
- Network: Primera Cadena
- Release: 9 February 1967

Historia de la frivolidad (transl. History of frivolity) is a Spanish television special by Televisión Española, directed by Narciso Ibáñez Serrador, written by himself and Jaime de Armiñán, with music by Augusto Algueró and drawings by Mingote. It first aired on 9 February 1967. It relates, through a series of humorous sketches, the history of eroticism, and the efforts of the censors of all ages to conceal it.

== Plot ==
The president of the Women's League against Frivolity delivers a speech to would-be censors, and shows the History of eroticism, through a series of sketches, from Adam and Eve to the near future, praising the efforts to conceal any glimpse of impudence.

== Production ==
Jesús Aparicio-Bernal, Director-General of RTVE, Adolfo Suárez, Director of Programmes of Televisión Española, and Juan José Rosón, had the idea of improving the very poor impression that Francoist Spain had abroad, showing the image of a modern and tolerant Spain. They commissioned the task of creating a special intended to participate in the most important international television festivals at the time to Narciso Ibáñez Serrador. He created, along with Jaime de Armiñán, what was to be named Historia de la censura (transl. History of censorship) a television special with an ironic subtle sense of humor evidencing the censorship in Francoist Spain. But they suffered the censorship themselves and had to change the name to Historia de la frivolidad.

The special was sent to the Monte-Carlo Television Festival whose organization demanded that, to participate in the competition, the special had to have been broadcast. So, it was broadcast on 9 February 1967, without promotion, almost at midnight and after the National Anthem that marked the end of the channel's daily broadcast.

== Cast ==
- Irene Gutiérrez Caba
- Margot Cottens
- Rafaela Aparicio
- Pilar Muñoz
- Lola Gaos
- Luis Morris
- Teresa Gimpera
- Josefina Serratosa
- Mary Paz Pondal
- Regine Gobin
- Enrique Navarro
- Antonio Riquelme
- Narciso Ibáñez Menta
- Emilio Laguna
- Irán Eory
- Cris Huerta
- Ricardo Palacios
- Luis Sánchez Polack
- Fernando Santos
- Tomás Zori
- Diana Darvey
- Agustín González
- Fernando Rey
- Ketty de la Cámara
- Beatriz Savón
- Jaime Blanch
- José Luis Coll
- Álvaro de Luna
- Javier de Paul
- Pedro Sempson
- José María Prada
- Emilio Gutiérrez Caba
- Alberto Berco
- Roberto Llamas
- Manuel Codeso
- Paloma Valdés
- Elisa Montés

== Legacy ==
=== In popular culture ===
The ladies of the Women's League against Frivolity were the precursors of the characters from Tacañón del Todo, the negative part at Ibáñez Serrador game show Un, dos, tres... responda otra vez.

== Accolades ==
| Year | Festival | Award | Result | Ref. |
|---|---|---|---|---|
| 1968 | MIFED Milan Festival | Targa d'Argento | Won | |
| 1968 | Monte-Carlo Television Festival | Golden Nymph Award for Best Direction | Won | |
| 1968 | Monte-Carlo Television Festival | UNDA Prize | Won | |
| 1968 | Montreaux Festival | Rose d'Or | Won | |
| 1968 | Montreaux Festival | Press Prize | Won | |
