= Erika Dos Santos =

Spanish rapper (b.1997)

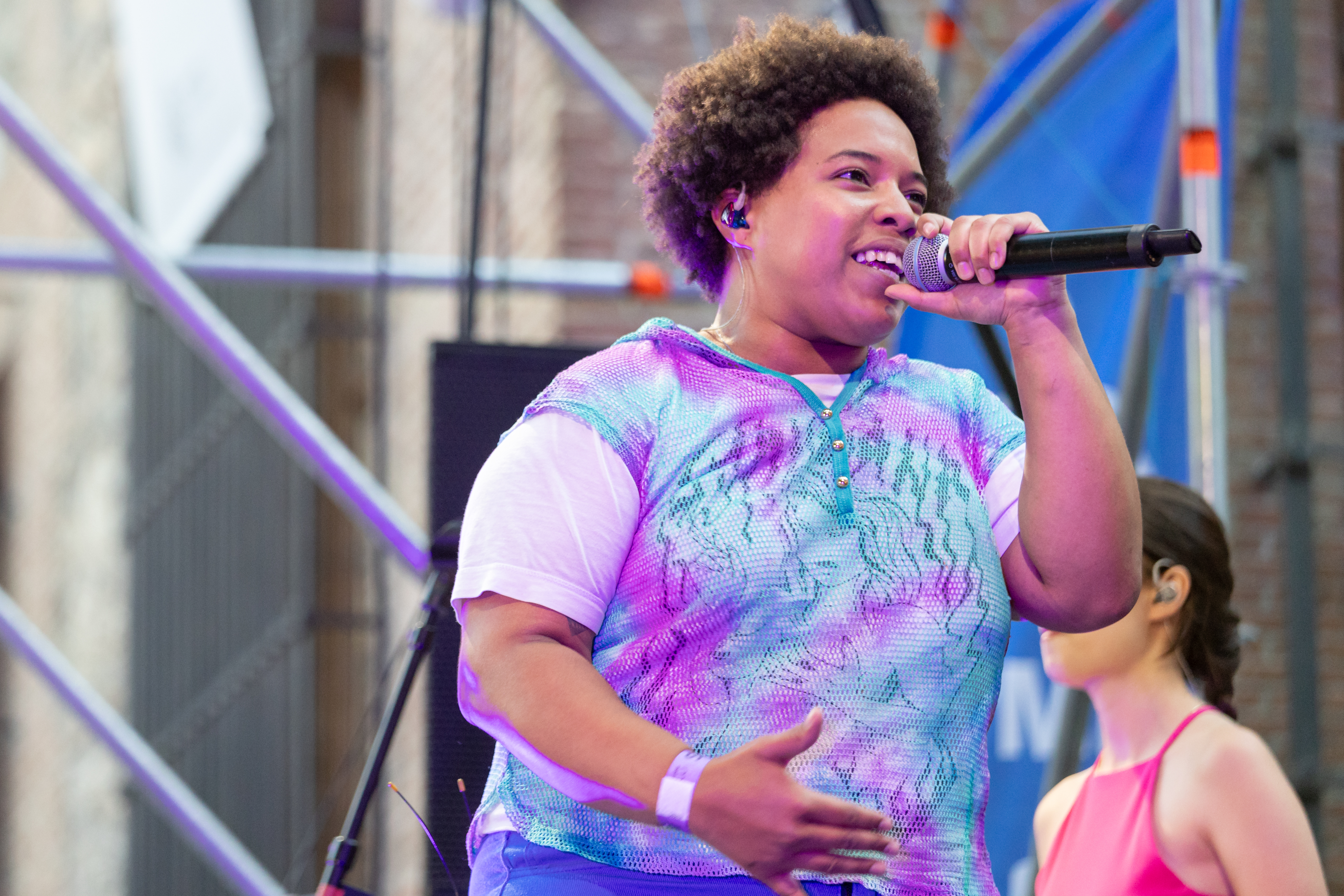

Background information
- Birth name: Erika L. Dos Santos Ramos
- Also known as: Erika2Santos
- Born: 1997 (age 27–28); Madrid, Spain
- Genres: Hip-hop, freestyle rap, battle rap
- Occupation: Rapper
- Instrument: Voice
- Years active: 2016–present

Erika L. Dos Santos Ramos (Madrid, 1997), known artistically as Erika Dos Santos and Erika2Santos, is a Spanish rapper. She has been called a "pioneer" of women's freestyle and battle rap in Spain.

== Biography ==
Erika Dos Santos was born in Madrid in 1997, into a family originally from Cape Verde. She lives in the San Cristóbal neighbourhood of Madrid. In 2016, Dos Santos gave the talk Cosas que hacer antes de morir at a TEDxYouth conference in Madrid. That same year, she won second prize in the Sanse Urbano festival, behind fellow rapper Alberto Robledo Bustos. In 2018, she participated in the Spanish edition of the X Factor television programme, obtaining four "yeses" for her performance and in which she was compared to Trinidadian rapper Nicki Minaj.

Dos Santos has participated four times in the Red Bull Batalla de Gallos. In 2017 she became the first woman to make it through the competition, reaching what at the time was called "The Last Man" (Spanish: El último hombre). This led the competition to change the name of the event to "The Last Chance" (Spanish: La última oportunidad), a name that has been maintained in subsequent editions. In 2019, she was a semi-finalist in the Batalla de Gallos. She was one of the first two women to make it through to the semi-final, along with fellow rapper Sara Socas.

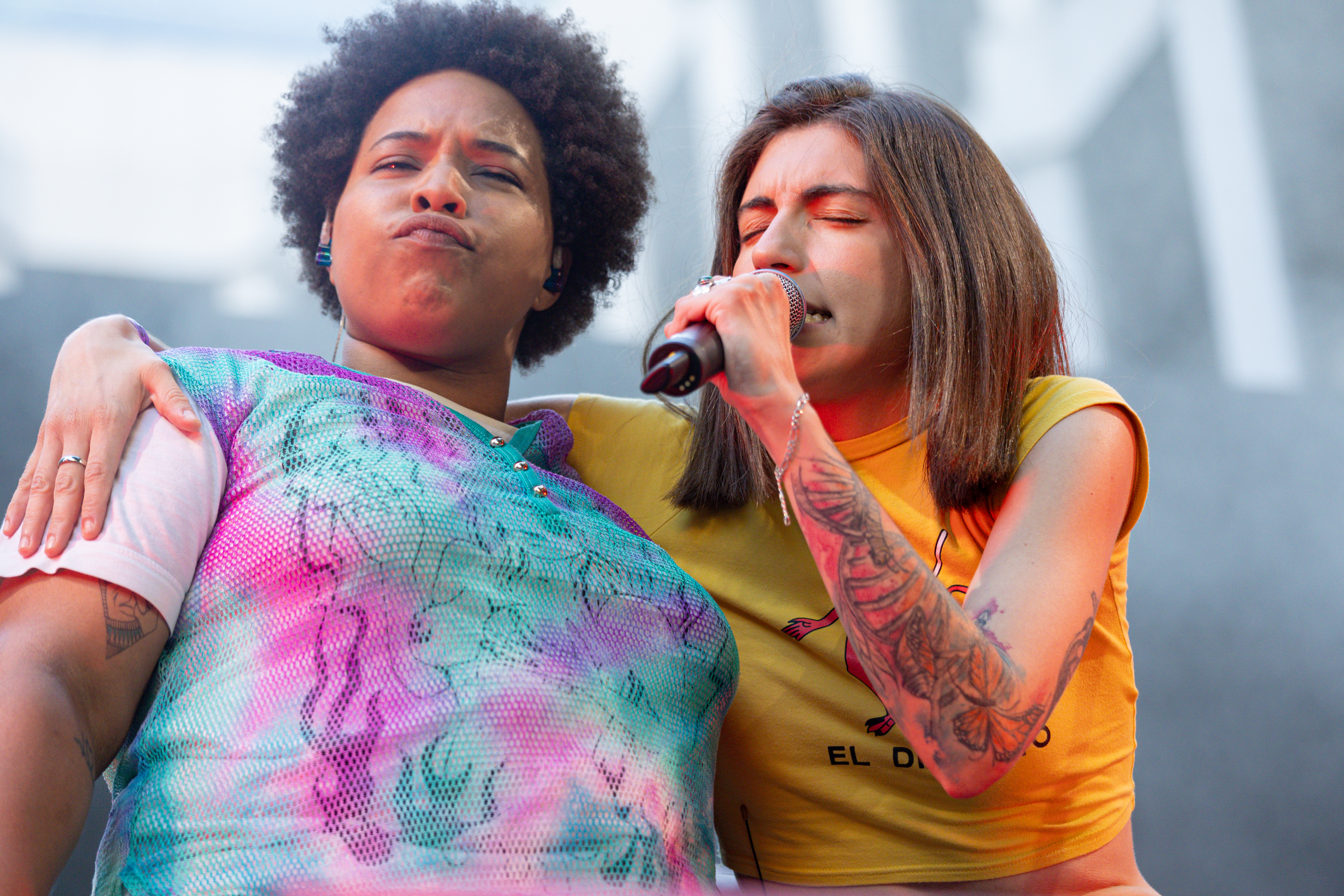
Erika Dos Santos (left) and Sara Socas (right) performing together.

She has also developed social projects that use rap as a form of social intervention. In 2018, she and Sara Socas gave workshops for teenagers at risk of social exclusion in high schools in the Community of Madrid. She has also promoted the Cypher School project to promote tolerance through rap, poetry and freestyle in La Parcería.

In 2023, on the occasion of International Women's Day, Dos Santos was one of eight women honoured by the Efeminista media for their women's rights activism.
