= Paradise Hills (film) =

2019 film directed by Alice Waddington

- Theatrical release poster
- Directed by: Alice Waddington
- Screenplay by: Brian DeLeeuw; Nacho Vigalondo
- Story by: Alice Waddington
- Produced by: Adrian Guerra; Núria Valls
- Starring: Emma Roberts; Milla Jovovich; Eiza González; Awkwafina; Danielle Macdonald; Jeremy Irvine; Arnaud Valois
- Cinematography: Josu Inchaustegui
- Edited by: Guillermo de la Cal
- Music by: Lucas Vidal
- Production companies: Nostromo Pictures; Colina Paraiso AIE
- Distributed by: Alfa Pictures
- Release dates: 26 January 2019 (Sundance); 11 October 2019 (Spain)
- Running time: 95 minutes
- Country: Spain
- Language: English
- Budget: $10 million
- Box office: $414,515

Paradise Hills is a 2019 English-language Spanish science fantasy thriller film directed by Alice Waddington in her feature directorial debut. It stars Milla Jovovich, Eiza González, and Emma Roberts as Uma, a young woman sent to Paradise, a mysterious behavioural modification centre for women who have displeased their families, alongside Danielle Macdonald, Awkwafina, Jeremy Irvine, Arnaud Valois.

The film had its world premiere at the Sundance Film Festival on 26 January 2019. It was released in Spain on 11 October 2019 by Alfa Pictures and in the United States on 25 October 2019 by Samuel Goldwyn Films.

== Plot ==
At her wedding, rich socialite Uma is toasted by her guests, who compliment her new attitude. Later, she is pinned to a bed by her husband, Son, who happily remarks on how much more obedient she is.

Two months earlier, Uma awakens in a strange room and realizes that she is trapped on an island called Paradise. She runs away from her captors, but is caught and returned by a fellow patient, Amarna. It is explained to Uma that Paradise is essentially a sort of treatment center for rebellious young women; in Uma's case, she was admitted to the center for rejecting a marriage proposal her mother wants her to accept. Uma becomes friends with her roommates Chloe and Yu, as well as befriending Amarna, a well-known singer sent to Paradise after clashing with her management company.

As Uma adjusts to life on the island, her boyfriend from the mainland, Markus, sneaks onto the island posing as a gardener and promises that he can rescue her. A jealous Amarna tells Uma to be careful and reveals that she has her own secret plan to escape as her fans have smuggled her a rowboat she and Uma can use to leave. Before they can put their plan into action, Amarna is informed that she has graduated early. She tells Uma to rescue herself and Markus. Before she leaves, Amarna also reveals that the milk the women drink each day is drugged so they sleep through the night. Amarna parts from Uma with a kiss.

After a treatment during which Uma is forced to watch old news reports of her father's suicide, Uma reacts badly and is drugged and put into solitary confinement. She awakens two weeks later and meets with the Duchess, who runs the Paradise program. Learning that she will be sent home the next day, Uma decides to leave and convinces Chloe and Yu to run away with her in the night. Before they can escape, Yu is taken to an operating room for a final treatment. When Uma and Chloe try to rescue her, the doctors attack them, and the women are forced to kill them.

Uma, Chloe, and a badly injured Yu manage to escape. They stumble into a control room where they learn that their therapy has not been to rehabilitate them, but to replicate them. Uma learns that Markus never intended to rescue her, but was hired by Paradise to determine her behavior in sexual situations. As Uma and her friends run from the guards, they stumble into a room where they meet their "replicants"; poor and lower-class women who have undergone extensive plastic and cosmetic surgeries and been trained to mimic the voices and personalities of the patients so they can assume their identities. Yu dies and Chloe and Uma are forced to move on without her, but before they go, Uma leaves behind her memory locket of her father for her replacement and tells her that in order to fully embody Uma, she must hate Son, the man responsible for her father's death.

Uma and Chloe make their way into a garden where they see the lifeless bodies of former Paradise captives, including Amarna, ensnared in rose thorns. Uma sees the Duchess, who is revealed to be a vampiric rosebush, feeding on Chloe's body and is wrapped up in vines as the Duchess prepares to make her her next victim. However, Uma's replicant saves her by pretending to be the real Uma, distracting the Duchess enough so that Uma can fatally stab her with a scalpel. Uma and her replicant, Anna, manage to reach the rowboat. Markus finds them at the shore, but, remorseful, chooses not to report their location as they board it and escape. Anna reveals she cannot return to her former life and so she and Uma develop a plan. Anna returns to Uma's wealthy family pretending to be Uma, and marries Son. On their wedding night, she remains downstairs while Uma herself seduces Son and stabs him before they can have sex. Anna is thus free from blame as she was downstairs among many witnesses when the murder occurred. Anna "discovers" Son's body and screams for help, now free to live her life as a wealthy widow. Uma, having secured her revenge, flees into the night to begin a new life.

== Cast ==
- Emma Roberts as Uma/Anna
- Eiza González as Amarna
- Milla Jovovich as The Duchess
- Awkwafina as Yu
- Danielle Macdonald as Chloe
- Jeremy Irvine as Markus
- Arnaud Valois as Son

== Production ==
In November 2017, Emma Roberts and Danielle Macdonald joined the cast of the film, with Alice Waddington directing from a screenplay by Nacho Vigalondo and Brian DeLeeuw, with Adrián Guerra and Núria Valls producing under their Nostromo Pictures banner. In March 2018, Eiza González joined the cast of the film. In April 2018, Milla Jovovich, Jeremy Irvine, and Awkwafina joined the cast of the film.

=== Filming ===
Principal photography began in April 2018. Filming took place in the Spanish municipality of Gáldar, Gran Canaria, Canary Islands. Two locations near Barcelona were also used: La Fábrica, a former cement factory repurposed as headquarters by Ricardo Bofill Taller de Arquitectura in Sant Just Desvern, and the nearby palatial house complex of Xavier Corberó in Esplugues de Llobregat.

== Release ==
Paradise Hills had its world premiere at the Sundance Film Festival on 26 January 2019. Shortly after, Samuel Goldwyn Films acquired distribution rights to the film. It was released in Spain on 11 October 2019, by Alfa Pictures. In the United States, it was released on 25 October 2019, followed by video on demand on 1 November 2019.

== Reception ==
It holds a 67% rating and an average score of 6.3/10 on review aggregator website Rotten Tomatoes based on 70 reviews. The site's consensus reads: "Its ambitious reach occasionally exceeds its grasp, but Paradise Hills offers fans of thoughtful sci-fi a visually distinctive treat with timely themes". Leslie Felperin of The Hollywood Reporter wrote, "Words can't do justice to the truly lavish sets and costumes on display here which are so dazzling, intricate and bizarre they serve as a useful distraction from the awkward dialogue and plot holes." Louisa Moore, writing for Screen Zealots, similarly stated, "Sometimes a film can be a mess story-wise but is so well made and has something so interesting to say that it would be a crime not to applaud the effort.". Carlos Aguilar of TheWrap wrote, "Challenging the narrative frameworks, the film turns obsolete archetypes into individuals with agency. Princesses don't need a knight to escape their prisons; they can blow them up themselves" but finds the conclusion "contrived" writing of it, "It's a well-intentioned effort to imbue the fanciful tale with more socio-politically relevant drama, but it lacks impact because it must compete with a multitude of more concrete musings."
