= Lucas (2021 film) =

- Theatrical release poster
- Directed by: Àlex Montoya
- Written by: Àlex Montoya; Sergio Barrejón
- Starring: Jorge Motos; Jorge Cabrera; Jordi Aguilar; Irene Aula; Emma Lainez
- Cinematography: Jon D. Domínguez
- Edited by: Àlex Montoya
- Music by: Siddhartha Barnhoorn
- Production companies: Raw Pictures; Telespan 2000
- Distributed by: Begin Again
- Release dates: 4 June 2021 (Málaga); 25 June 2021 (Spain)
- Running time: 92 minutes
- Country: Spain
- Language: Spanish

Lucas is a 2021 Spanish thriller drama film directed by Àlex Montoya which stars Jorge Motos as the title character.

== Plot ==
In the wake of the death of his father, Lucas is a boy who accepts an offer to cede his own photographs to Álvaro in exchange for money. The latter, a man wants to use them to contact with reportedly "underage girls" in social media by means of catfishing.

== Cast ==
- Jorge Motos as Lucas.
- Jorge Cabrera as Álvaro.
- Jordi Aguilar
- Irene Aula
- Emma Lainez
- Máximo Pastor
- Héctor Gozalbo
- Ana Berenguer

== Production ==
Lucas is based on the short film of the same name directed by Àlex Montoya and shot in 2012. The film was produced by Raw Pictures and Telespan 2000, with the participation of the Institut Valencià de Cultura (IVC), RTVE and À Punt Media. It was shot in locations of the province of Valencia, including Valencia, El Palmar and La Albufera.

== Release ==
The film opened the Zonazine section of the Málaga Spanish Film Festival in June 2021. Distributed by Begin Again, it was theatrically released in Spain on 25 June 2021.

== Awards and nominations ==
| Year | Award | Category | Nominee(s) | Result | Ref. |
|---|---|---|---|---|---|
| 2021 | 4th Berlanga Awards | Best Film | | Nominated | |
| 2021 | 4th Berlanga Awards | Best Director | Àlex Montoya | Nominated | |
| 2021 | 4th Berlanga Awards | Best Screenplay | Àlex Montoya, Sergio Barrejón | Nominated | |
| 2021 | 4th Berlanga Awards | Best Actor | Jorge Motos | Won | |
| 2021 | 4th Berlanga Awards | Best Supporting Actor | Jorge Cabrera | Won | |
| 2021 | 4th Berlanga Awards | Best Supporting Actor | Jordi Aguilar | Nominated | |
| 2021 | 4th Berlanga Awards | Best Editing and Post-production | Àlex Montoya | Nominated | |
| 2021 | 4th Berlanga Awards | Best Cinematography and Lighting | Jon D. Domínguez | Nominated | |
| 2021 | 4th Berlanga Awards | Best Art Direction | Jero Bono | Nominated | |
| 2022 | 77th CEC Medals | Best New Actor | Jorge Motos | Nominated | |
| 2022 | 36th Goya Awards | Best New Actor | Jorge Motos | Nominated | |

== See also ==
- List of Spanish films of 2021
