= 7:35 in the Morning =

7:35 de la Mañana
- Spanish poster
- Directed by: Nacho Vigalondo
- Written by: Nacho Vigalondo
- Produced by: Eduardo Carneros; Javier Ibarreche
- Starring: Marta Belenguer; Nacho Vigalondo
- Cinematography: Jon Díez Domínguez
- Edited by: Javier Diaz Vega
- Music by: Fernando Velázquez
- Release date: 2003
- Running time: 8 minutes
- Country: Spain
- Language: Spanish

7:35 in the Morning (Spanish: 7:35 de la Mañana) is a 2003 Spanish short film directed and written by Nacho Vigalondo. It was nominated for Best Live Action Short Film at the 77th Academy Awards.

== Plot ==
The film is an eight-minute long black and white short that depicts a Spanish woman encountering a strange singing man in a coffee shop one morning. The strange man turns out to be a suicide bomber, who professes his love through the words of a song to a woman who turns up every day at 7:35 in the morning (de la mañana). The others in the cafe have predetermined lines to say at points during the song, or they risk the threat of being blown up, and even a short dance routine.

At the start of the film, the woman realises that something is not right when sitting down: everyone is quiet and refuses to acknowledge her presence. When the man reveals himself to be a suicide bomber after one of the customers in the cafe refuses to sing, she calls the police whilst he is not watching. Roughly three minutes later, the police arrive outside the coffee shop. The man finishes his song and emerges from the cafe to face the police, holding a big sack of confetti. He blows himself up, and the confetti showers over the woman. The credits roll.

== Cast ==
- Marta Belenguer as the woman
- Nacho Vigalondo as the man
- Antonio Tato as Luis, the head waiter
- Borja Cobeaga as Assistant Waiter 1
- Javier Reguilón as Assistant Waiter 2
- Alejandro Garrido as Bar Customer
- César Velasco as Customer 1
- Esperanza Palacios as Customer 2
- Manuel Nebreda as Customer 3
- Sebastian Elices as Customer 4
- Resu Vigalondo as Customer 5
- Dolores Gonzalez as Customer 6
- Alejandro Tejería as Customer 7
- Patricia Maldonado as Customer 8
- Javier Sanchez De La Cima as Child 1
- Santiago De Los Santos as Child 2

== See also ==
- List of Spanish Academy Award winners and nominees
