= Stories to Stay Awake (2021 TV series) =

Spanish television series

- Promotional poster
- Spanish: Historias para no dormir
- Genre: Anthology; Horror
- Based on: Historias para no dormir by Narciso Ibáñez Serrador
- Directed by: Rodrigo Cortés; Rodrigo Sorogoyen; Paco Plaza; Paula Ortiz; Salvador Calvo; Nacho Vigalondo; Alice Waddington; Jaume Balagueró
- Country of origin: Spain
- Original language: Spanish
- No. of seasons: 2
- No. of episodes: 8

Production
- Executive producers: Laura Abril; Cristina Alcelay; Gonzalo De Castro Fraga; Bárbara Vayá; Alejandro Ibáñez; Robert Franke; Mar Diáz; David García; Manuel Sanabria; Sebastián Vibes
- Producers: José Maria Lozano; Carlos Urrutia; Nélida Castro; Suzanne Frank; Robert Franke
- Production companies: ViacomCBS International Studios; ZDF Studios; Prointel; Isla Audiovisual

Original release
- Network: Amazon Prime Video
- Release: 5 November 2021 – 27 October 2022

Stories to Stay Awake (Spanish: Historias para no dormir) is a Spanish horror anthology television series consisting of a reboot of the series of the same name created by Chicho Ibáñez Serrador and broadcast on TVE from 1966 to 1982. It was released on Amazon Prime Video on 5 November 2021 and it is slated to air on RTVE in the future. The four parts are directed by Rodrigo Cortés, Rodrigo Sorogoyen, Paco Plaza and Paula Ortiz.

A second season was released on 22 October 2022, with episodes directed by Salvador Calvo, Jaume Balagueró, Alice Waddington and Nacho Vigalondo.

== Cast ==
"El doble"

- Vicky Luengo as Eva.
- David Verdaguer as Dani
- María Romanillos

"Freddy"

- Miki Esparbé as André
- Carlos Santos as Chicho Ibáñez Serrador
- Adriana Torrebejano as Olga.
- Enrique Villén
- Ismael Martínez
- Maru Valdivielso

"El asfalto"

- Dani Rovira as Baldo
- Inma Cuesta as Rut

"La broma"

- Eduard Fernández
- Nathalie Poza
- Raúl Arévalo
- Adolfo de los Reyes

"El trasplante"

- Javier Gutiérrez
- Petra Martínez
- Carlos Cuevas
- Ramón Barea

"La alarma"

- Roberto Álamo as Claudio
- Javier Gurruchaga
- Neus Sanz
- Carlos Areces
- Aníbal Gómez as Gabriel
- Sofía Oria
- Jordi Coll

"La pesadilla"

- Álvaro Morte
- Mina El Hammani
- Boré Buika

"El televisor"

- Pablo Derqui
- Manuela Vellés

== Production and release ==
Historias para no dormir is based on the series of the same name created and directed by Chicho Ibáñez Serrador, which aired from 1962 to 1968 and in 1982. Produced by VIS (a division of ViacomCBS Networks), Prointel and Isla Audiovisual for Amazon Prime Video and RTVE, the series consists of 4 self-contained episodes featuring a running time of around 50 minutes.

"La broma" was directed and written by Rodrigo Cortés; "El doble" was directed by Rodrigo Sorogoyen and written by Sorogoyen alongside Daniel Remón; "Freddy" was directed by Paco Plaza and written by Plaza alongside Alberto Marini; and "El asfalto" was directed by Paula Ortiz and written by Manuel Jabois alongside Rodrigo Cortés.

On 7 October 2021, Amazon Prime Video released a trailer and set a release date for 5 November 2021.

Distributed by ViacomCBS International Studios in Spain, Portugal, Italy and Latin America, ZDF Enterprises acquired the international distribution rights elsewhere.

The four episodes were presented at the 54th Sitges Film Festival in October 2021.

In February 2022, VIS announced the renovation of the series for a second season, with episodes directed by Jaume Balagueró, Nacho Vigalondo, Salvador Calvo and Alice Waddington. Shooting of the episode "El trasplante", directed by Calvo, co-written by Ignacio del Moral, and starring Javier Gutiérrez, Petra Martínez, Carlos Cuevas and Ramón Barea, was already underway.

Vigalondo's episode "La alarma" was already shooting in March 2022, featuring Roberto Álamo, Javier Gurruchaga, Neus Sanz, Carlos Areces, Aníbal Gómez, Sofía Oria and Jordi Coll. Shooting of Waddington's episode "La pesadilla", co-written by Rocío Martínez Llano and starring Álvaro Morte, Mina El Hammani and Boré Buika, wrapped in May 2022. Balagueró's episode "El televisor" (written alongside Beto Marini) shot afterwards, starring Pablo Derqui and Manuela Vellés.

== Episodes ==
No. in season	Title	Directed by	Written by	Original release date
1	"El doble"	Rodrigo Sorogoyen	Rodrigo Sorogoyen & Daniel Remón	5 November 2021
2	"Freddy"	Paco Plaza	Paco Plaza & Alberto Marini	5 November 2021
3	"El asfalto"	Paula Ortiz	Manuel Jabois & Rodrigo Cortés	5 November 2021
4	"La broma"	Rodrigo Cortés	Rodrigo Cortés	5 November 2021

=== Season 2 ===
No. in season	Title	Directed by	Written by	Original release date
1	"El trasplante"	Salvador Calvo	Salvador Calvo & Ignacio del Moral	27 October 2022
2	"El televisor"	Jaume Balagueró	Jaume Balagueró & Alberto Marini (based on an idea by: Joaquín Amichatis)	27 October 2022
3	"La pesadilla"	Alice Waddington	Rocío Martínez Llano & Alice Waddington	27 October 2022
4	"La alarma"	Nacho Vigalondo	Nacho Vigalondo	27 October 2022

== Accolades ==
Year	Award	Category	Nominee(s)	Result	Ref.
2021	27th Forqué Awards	Best Fiction Series		Nominated	
2022	9th Feroz Awards	Best Drama Series		Nominated	
2022	28th Forqué Awards	Best Fiction Series		Nominated	
2023	31st Actors and Actresses Union Awards	Best Television Actor in a Secondary Role	Carlos Cuevas	Nominated	
