= Fraternity (film) =

- Theatrical release poster
- Spanish: El aspirante
- Directed by: Juan Gautier
- Screenplay by: Juan Gautier; Josep Lluís Gómez Frechilla; Samuel Hurtado
- Produced by: Andrea Gautier; Juan Gautier; Diego Saniz; Manuel Manrique; Zoe Berriatua; Rosa García Merino
- Starring: Lucas Nabor; Jorge Motos; Eduardo Rosa; Catalina Sopelana
- Cinematography: Rober Montero
- Edited by: Juan Gautier; Mikel Iribarren
- Music by: Cirilo Fernández
- Distributed by: Begin Again Films
- Release dates: July 2024 (Atlàntida Film Fest); 20 September 2024 (Spain)
- Country: Spain
- Language: Spanish

Fraternity (Spanish: El aspirante) is a 2024 Spanish psychological thriller film directed by Juan Gautier (in his directorial debut feature). It stars Jorge Motos, Lucas Nabor, Eduardo Rosa, and Catalina Sopelana.

== Plot ==
The plot follows the plight of rookies Carlos and Dani in the university residence Tolentino, facing the worst of themselves after being caught in a downward spiral involving toxic masculinity and hazing.

== Cast ==
- Lucas Nabor as Carlos
- Jorge Motos as Dani
- Eduardo Rosa as Pepe
- Catalina Sopelana as Lau
- Felipe Pirazán as Fer
- Pedro Rubio as Olmo

== Production ==
The MAFIZ industry area held in parallel to the 27th Málaga Film Festival awarded the project with the Málaga Work In Progress España prize in March 2024. The film was produced by Smiz and Pixel alongside Kabiria Films, La Bestia Produce and Featurent, with the participation of RTVE and the backing of Ayuntamiento de Madrid, the Madrid regional administration, and ECAM. It was fully shot in Madrid.

== Release ==
Begin Again Films acquired domestic distribution and international sales rights to the film, which was presented in the competition slate of the 14th Atlàntida Mallorca Film Fest in July 2024. It was released theatrically in Spain on 20 September 2024.

== Reception ==
Javier Ocaña of El País wrote that the whole "is complex, bittersweet and cinematographically vibrant. And the performers are fantastic".

Carlos Marañón of Cinemanía rated the film 3 out of 5 stars, declaring it a "solvent feature film of increasing tension and oppressive atmosphere".

== See also ==
- List of Spanish films of 2024
