= The Gardener (TV series) =

Spanish television series

- Promotional release poster
- Spanish: El jardinero
- Created by: Miguel Sáez Carral
- Written by: Miguel Sáez Carral; Isa Sánchez
- Directed by: Mikel Rueda; Rafa Montesinos
- Starring: Álvaro Rico; Cecilia Suárez; Catalina Sopelana
- Country of origin: Spain
- Original language: Spanish
- No. of episodes: 6

Production
- Executive producers: Miguel Lorenzo; José Manuel Lorenzo
- Running time: 44–48 minutes
- Production company: DLO Producciones

Original release
- Network: Netflix
- Release: 11 April 2025

The Gardener (Spanish: El jardinero) is a Spanish romantic thriller television series created by Miguel Sáez Carral. It stars Álvaro Rico, Catalina Sopelana, and Cecilia Suárez.

== Plot ==
China “La China” Jurado and her emotionally-impaired son Elmer use their gardening company as a cover for their contract killing activities. Elmer falls for one of the targets he is supposed to kill, elementary school teacher Violeta, risking the family business.

== Cast ==
- Álvaro Rico as Elmer, a gardener and botanist with an impaired ability to process emotions following vehicle accident as a child. Comprises a contract-killing operation with his mother.
- Cecilia Suárez as La China Jurado, Elmer's mother and effective handler in their criminal operation.
- Catalina Sopelana as Violeta, an elementary school teacher, targeted for assassination by Sabela Costeira
- Emma Suárez as Sabela, a woman who believes Violeta is responsible for the death of her son Xoan and commissions the service of the Jurados to kill her
- Francis Lorenzo as Torres, a Pontevedra PD officer investigating the local murders along with Carrera
- María Vázquez as Carrera, a Pontevedra PD officer, investigating the murders along with Torres
- Ivan Massagué as Tony
- Javier Morgade as Xoán
- Esteban Roel

== Production ==
The Gardener is a DLO Producciones production for Netflix. It was created by Miguel Sáez Carral, written by Sáez Carral and Isa Sánchez, and directed by Mikel Rueda and Rafa Montesinos. Shooting locations included Pontevedra, Cambados, Vilagarcía de Arousa, Tomiño, Ribeira, Toledo, and Madrid.

== Release ==
The series debuted on Netflix on 11 April 2025.

== Episode list ==
No. overall	No. in season	Title	Directed by	Written by	Original release date
1	1	"Atlantic Landscape" (Paisaje atlántico)	Mikel Rueda	Miguel Sáez Carral	11 April 2025
2	2	"Seed Germination" (Germinación de las semillas)	Mikel Rueda	Miguel Sáez Carral	11 April 2025
3	3	"Organic Substrate" (Sustrato orgánico)	Mikel Rueda	Isa Sánchez	11 April 2025
4	4	"Pest Control" (Control de plagas)	Rafa Montesinos	Miguel Sáez Carral	11 April 2025
5	5	"Decomposition Island" (Isla de descomposición)	Rafa Montesinos	Isa Sánchez	11 April 2025
6	6	"Pruning Calendar" (Calendario de podas)	Rafa Montesinos	Miguel Sáez Carral	11 April 2025

== Viewership ==
According to data from Showlabs, The Gardener ranked fifth on Netflix in the United States during the week of 14–20 April 2025.

== See also ==
- 2025 in Spanish television
