= Invasión (2024 film) =

- Film poster
- Directed by: David Martín-Porras
- Screenplay by: Guillem Clua
- Based on: Invasión (play) by Guillem Clua
- Produced by: Eduardo Campoy; Adolfo Blanco; Raúl Berdonés; Pablo Jimeno
- Starring: Claudia Salas; Fran Berenguer; Sofía Oria; Nourdin Batán; Álvaro Rico; Andrés Gertrúdix; María Adánez; Carlos Fuentes
- Cinematography: José Martín Rosete
- Edited by: Frank Gutiérrez
- Music by: Arnau Bataller
- Production companies: Álamo Producciones Audiovisuales; A Contracorriente Films
- Distributed by: A Contracorriente Films
- Release dates: 8 March 2024 (Málaga); 28 June 2024 (Spain)
- Country: Spain
- Language: Spanish

Invasión is a 2024 science fiction drama film directed by David Martín-Porras from a screenplay by Guillem Clua. Its cast features Claudia Salas, Fran Berenguer, Sofía Oria, Nourdin Batán, Álvaro Rico, Andrés Gertrúdix, María Adánez, and Carlos Fuentes.

== Plot ==
Set against the backdrop of an alien invasion, the plot consists of three crossed stories involving two sides, with the protagonists having to learn to trust their enemy.

== Cast ==
- Claudia Salas as María
- Fran Berenguer as Iker
- Sofía Oria as Eli
- Nourdin Batán as Imar
- Álvaro Rico as Arturo
- Andrés Gertrúdix as Julio
- María Adánez as Carol
- Carlos Fuentes as José Luis
- Marga Arnau as Olga

== Production ==
The screenplay was written by Guillem Clua based on his own stage play of the same name. Directed by Clua's recurring collaborator David Martín-Porras, the film was produced by Eduardo Campoy's Álamo Producciones Audiovisuales alongside A Contracorriente Films. It was shot in Tenerife.

== Release ==
The film screened in the non-competitive slate of the 27th Málaga Film Festival's official selection on 8 March 2024. It was released theatrically in Spain on 28 June 2024.

== See also ==
- List of Spanish films of 2024
