= Who Can Kill a Child? =

1976 Spanish horror film

- Spanish film poster
- Spanish: ¿Quién puede matar a un niño?
- Directed by: Narciso Ibáñez Serrador
- Screenplay by: Luis Peñafiel
- Based on: El juego de los niños by Juan José Plans
- Produced by: Manuel Salvador
- Starring: Lewis Fiander; Prunella Ransome; Antonio Iranzo; Luis Ciges; Marisa Porcel; Miguel Narros
- Cinematography: José Luis Alcaine
- Edited by: Antonio Ramírez de Loaysa; Juan Serra
- Music by: Waldo de los Ríos
- Production company: Penta Films
- Distributed by: Manuel Salvador
- Release date: April 26, 1976
- Running time: 111 minutes
- Country: Spain
- Languages: English; Spanish

Who Can Kill a Child? (Spanish: ¿Quién puede matar a un niño?), released theatrically as Island of the Damned in the US, and Would You Kill A Child?, Death Is Child's Play (original release) and Island of Death (1979 re-release) in the UK, is a 1976 Spanish horror film directed by Narciso Ibáñez Serrador. The film follows an English couple who find an island inhabited by maniacal children.

== Plot ==
A montage of documentary footage depicts the effect of war on children. The film cuts from this mondo imagery to the story of English couple Tom and Evelyn (Lewis Fiander and Prunella Ransome), who are taking a vacation before the birth of their third child. They arrive on an island where they encounter grim-faced, silent children who seem to be the island's entire population. Throughout their stay, they witness the children behaving strangely. They later learn that the children are capable of violence; they have murdered just about every adult on the island. The couple is now forced to consider killing the children in self-defense. It is implied that the long list of atrocities and horrors brought upon children by adults' fighting and apathy has caused the island's children to take matters into their own hands. It is also shown that normal children are changed like the rest on the island merely by making eye contact with them.

Tom reluctantly shoots one boy with a gun when they are cornered in a room. Trapped in the room, Evelyn is killed when her unborn child joins the island children and attacks her from inside. By the next morning, a weary Tom is completely alone.

Tom eventually shoots an MP-40 at a group of children as he tries to escape the island, but the children follow him to the dock and attack en masse as he tries to cut a boat loose. As he tries to fight off the children, a Spanish military/police patrol boat arrives. The crew thinks that Tom is killing the children in cold blood, and one officer draws his weapon on him, ordering him to stay still. When he doesn't, the officer shoots him dead. The patrol boat docks, and the officers begin tending to the injured children, with the officer who shot Tom wondering aloud, "What kind of man…?" When asked where their parents are, the children point towards the town, and the three officers depart, leaving their boat and their weapons unsecured. One officer is stopped by a child calling out, "Goodbye!" He turns to see that the children have boarded the patrol boat and are unloading its small-arms inventory. One of the boys kills the three officers with a rifle.

The movie ends with a small group of children preparing to head to mainland Spain on a motorboat, taking care to go in low numbers to avoid suspicion. When one girl asks, "Do you think the other children will start playing the way we do?" the boy in charge grins and says, "Oh, yes… there are lots of children in the world. Lots of them".

== Cast ==
- Lewis Fiander as Tom
- Prunella Ransome as Evelyn
- Antonio Iranzo as Padre
- Marisa Porcel as Brit Van Der Holden
- Luis Ciges as Enrique Amoros
- Fabian Conde as Empleado
- Miguel Narros as Guardacostas

== Production ==
The film was based on a novel by Juan José Plans titled El juego de los niños (The children's game) and adapted for cinema by Narciso Ibáñez Serrador under his pseudonym Luis Peñafiel.

== Release ==
=== Home video ===
Divisa released a Blu-ray plus DVD combo in Spain on May 2, 2016, exclusive to the retail chain FNAC as part of its Filmoteca Nacional label. A regular Blu-ray followed on November 3.

Mondo Macabro released the uncut version on Blu-ray on its site as a (region-free) "Red Case Limited Edition" on May 28, 2018; a general release (in the US and Canada) followed on July 10 (the regular edition omits the lobbycards and the booklet from the limited edition and has a different cover).

Carlotta Films released a SteelBook Blu-ray in France on Sep 16, 2020; a regular edition followed on Apr 07, 2021.

Stingray released a 45th Anniversary Edition Blu-ray in Japan on Jan 29, 2021.

== Critical reception ==
=== Modern response ===
Modern critical response to the film has been mostly positive. Dennis Schwartz from Ozus' World Movie Reviews rated the film a grade B−, calling it "unapologetic downbeat" but criticized the third act as failing to capitalize on its interesting premise. Maitland McDonagh from TV Guide gave the film three out of five stars, stating that "it may be the finest variation on an enduring horror theme: The violent rebellion by children against cruel or indifferent adults". Felix Vasquez Jr. from Cinema Crazed called it "a harrowing disturbing look at the inherent evil children are capable of", and praised the film's unflinching narrative, disturbing sequences, and ending. Brett Gallman from Oh the Horror offered the film similar praise, as well as the film's "artful approach". Ian Jane from DVD Talk rated the film four out of five stars: "An intelligent, albeit very grim, thriller, Who Can Kill A Child? holds up well as a great piece of tension-filled filmmaking".

== Legacy ==
Who Can Kill a Child? has gained a cult following over the years since its initial release, and is now considered a cult classic. It later appeared at number 86 in Slant Magazine's list of "The 100 Best Horror Movies of All Time".

Released in 2012, Come Out and Play is a Mexican remake that closely mirrors the plot of the original.

== See also ==
- Beware! Children at Play – a 1989 American horror film
- Children of the Corn (film series)
