= Sara Socas =

Canarian freestyle rapper (b. 1997)

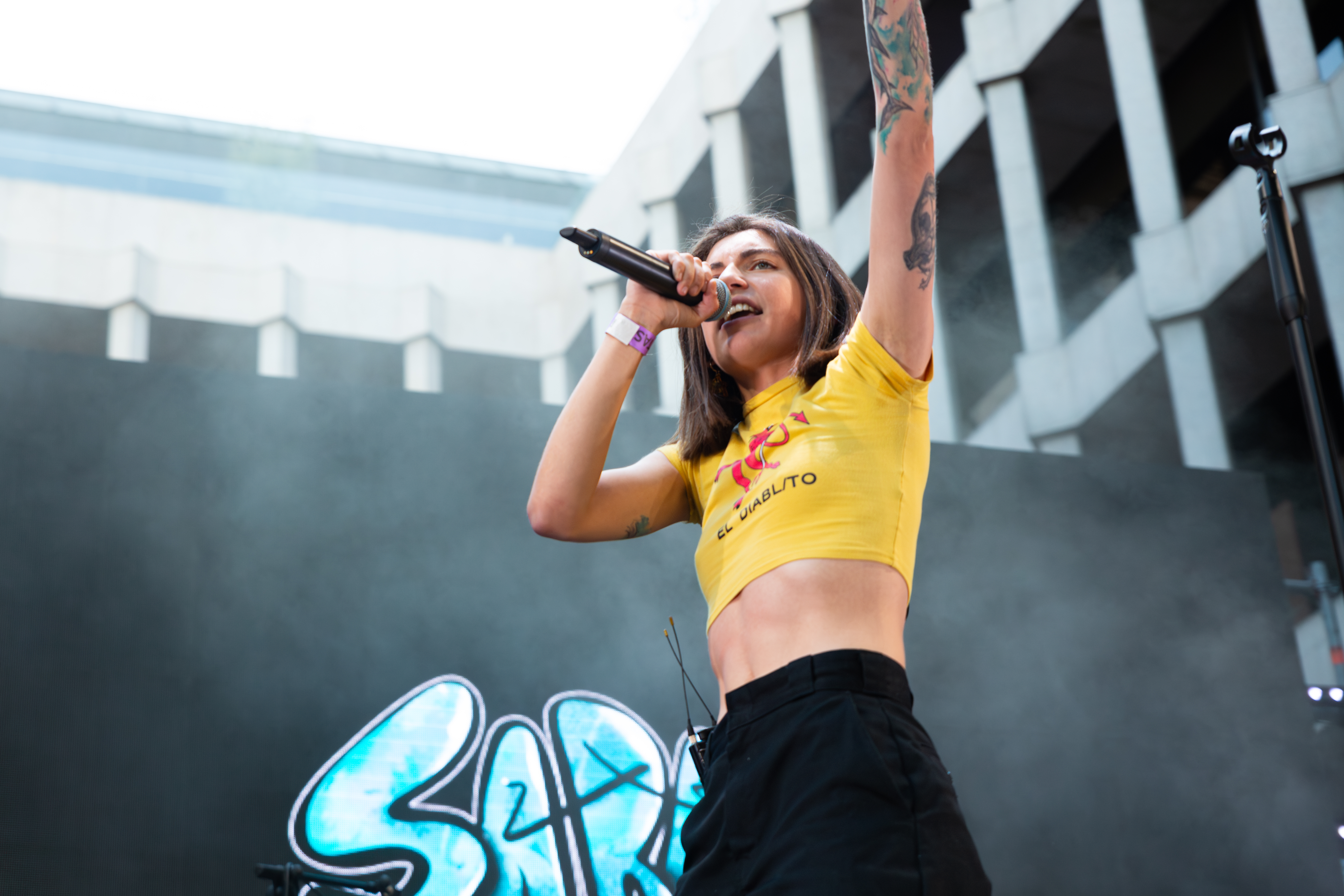

Background information
- Born: Sara Socas Martín; 30 August 1997 (age 28); Tegueste, Tenerife, Canary Islands, Spain
- Genres: Hip hop
- Instrument: Voice
- Years active: 2017–present
- Website: www.sarasocas.net

Sara Socas Martín (born 30 August 1997) is a Canarian singer-songwriter and freestyle rapper. In 2021, she became the first woman to be promoted as a freestyler to the Freestyle Master Series (FMS), considered the most important league in Spain in this field.

== Career ==
Socas studied a double degree in Journalism and Audiovisual Communication at the Charles III University of Madrid. She entered the world of freestyle rap in 2017 and also plays several musical instruments, such as the guitar, piano and bass. She is a contributor to the radio programme La Ventana on Cadena SER along with rapper Arkano, as well as an editor at Los 40, among others. Socas has also given rap workshops in several high schools in the Community of Madrid, aimed at teenagers at risk of social exclusion.

Socas won the second edition of the Madrid Girl Battle held in 2017, where she beat rapper Rasvy in the final. She also reached the quarterfinals of the DH17 Battle and the Pre-National Battle de Royal Rap. The following year, in 2018, she won the Femme Battle 2018, a women's battle-rap tournament, and the Batalla de Azuqueca 2018. That year she also reached the quarterfinals of the Madrid Urban Festival.

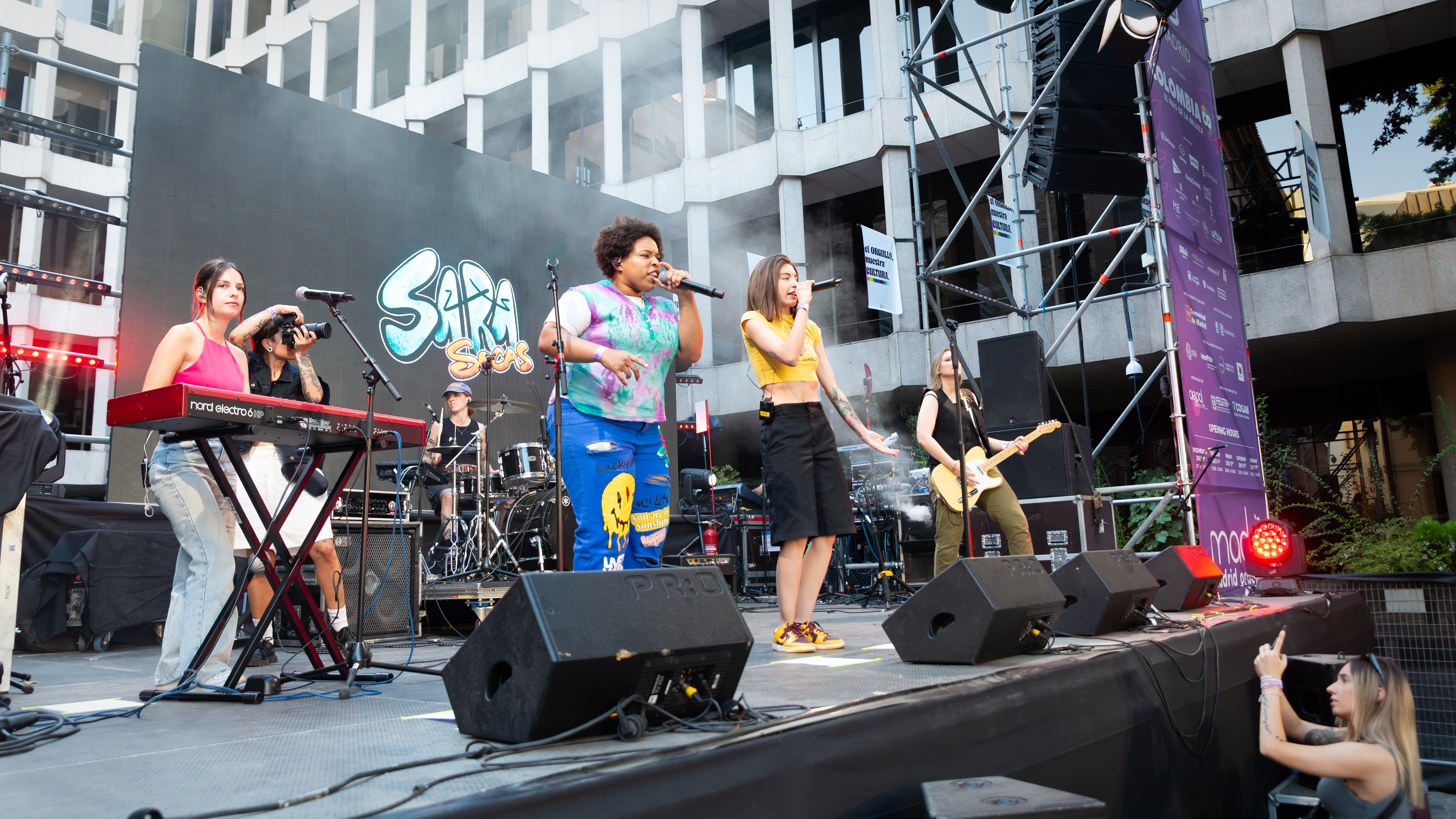
Sara Socas and Erika Dos Santos performing together.

In 2019, she was one of only two women to participate in the Red Bull "Batalla de Gallos", alongside fellow rapper Erika Dos Santos. Socas got through to the competition's semi-finals. In December 2019, she was the only woman to participate in the "Batallas de Gallos" at the Otumba exhibition in Mexico City, held by the freestyle organisation Beatle League. Her feminist retort in the battle against Rapder at that event made her a trending topic on Twitter and brought her to the attention of the general public. In 2020, she was chosen to go as a reserve to the Red Bull International Final of that year's Batalla de Gallos.

In 2019, she released her songs Ahora me quiero más and Sugarina with Vlack Motor, as well as the track Vuelve with singer-songwriter Fran Mariscal. Socas has been included in the line-up of the Holika Festival 2020. At the end of 2020, she released the single Bambi and in 2021 she released the track Apareciste tú on social media platforms.

In January 2021, Socas became the winner of the Gold Battle Barcelona regional. In January 2021, Socas participated in the Spanish National Freestyle League (FMS), becoming the first woman to compete in an FMS. A year earlier, she had turned down the FMS organisation's invitation to join the national league, as she wanted to gain access by competing, a milestone she finally achieved in April 2021. That year, Socas became the Federation Cup champion at the National Final of the Batalla de Maestros in Spain, and went straight through to the FMS final. She was the first woman to do so. As such, she was one of twelve rappers who would participate in the FMS the following season.

In 2023, she quit freestyle after receiving hate and sexist attacks on social networks for being a woman and a lesbian. That same year, she presented her first album TFN-MAD, with rap, trap, bachata and rhythm and blues influences, produced by Acción Sánchez of SFDK.
