= Álvaro Rico =

Spanish actor

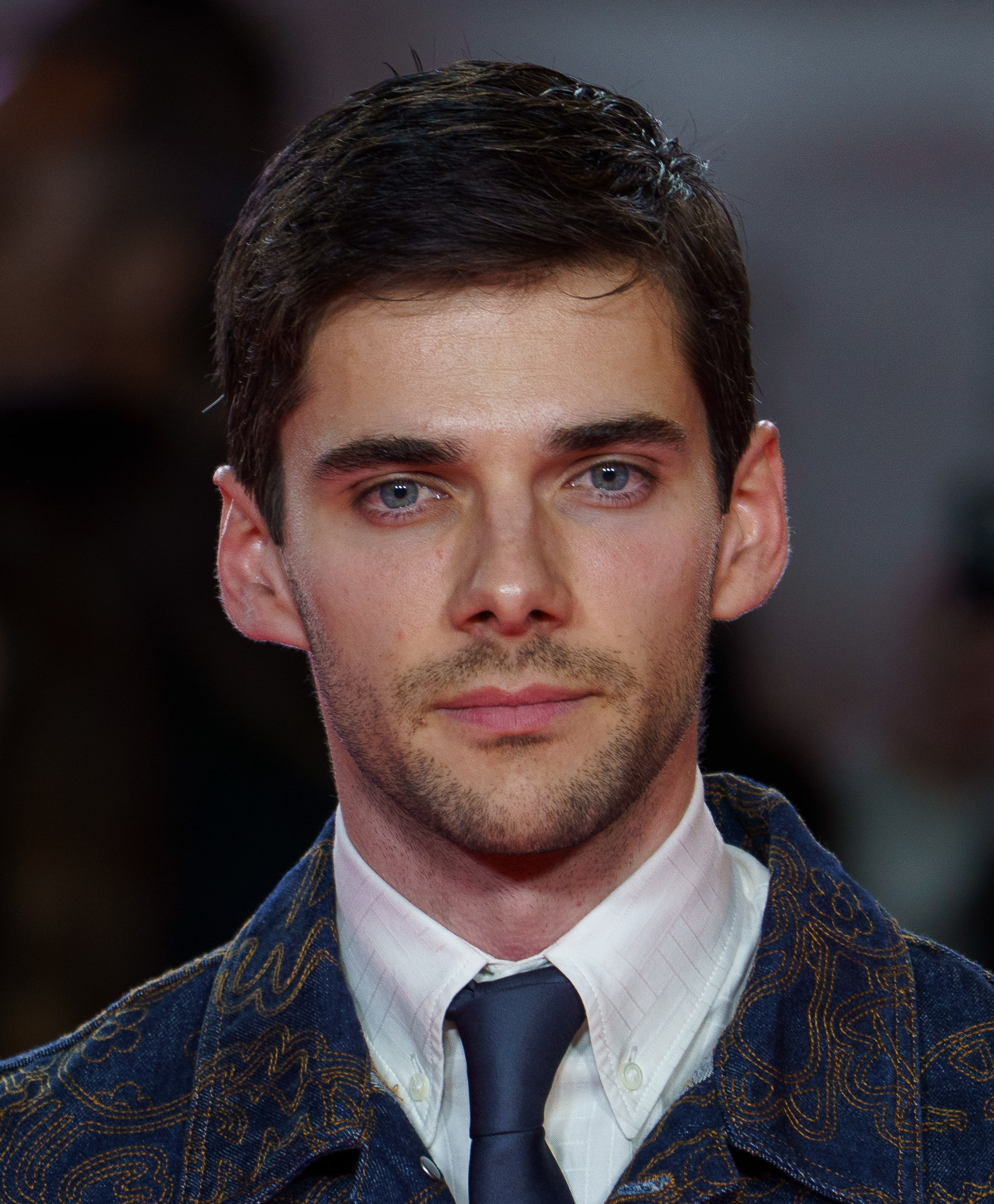
- Rico in 2025
- Born: Álvaro Rico Ladera; 13 August 1996 (age 29); La Puebla de Montalbán, Spain
- Occupation: Actor
- Years active: 2017–present

Álvaro Rico Ladera (born 13 August 1996) is a Spanish actor. He is known for playing the character of Polo in the teen drama series Elite.

== Career ==
In 2011, he began his career as an actor in a theater adaptation of La Celestina and his television debut was in 2017 in an episode of Medical Center. Also in 2017, he played Nicolás in Velvet Colección.

In December 2017, he was announced as a main cast member in the teen drama series Elite. In the series, he played Polo, a bisexual teenager who is in a love trio with two other classmates.

In 2021, he gave an interview for Vanity Teen magazine talking about the impact of the series on society and his upcoming performances.

He portrayed Enrique Ruano in the RTVE series Las abogadas.

== Filmography ==
=== Television ===
Year	Title	Role	Notes	Ref.
2017	Velvet Colección	Nicolás		
2018–2020	Elite	Leopoldo "Polo" Benavent Villada	Main cast (seasons 1–3)	
2020–2021	El Cid	Nuño		
2021	La caza. Tramuntana	Miquel Torres Bosch		
2021	Alba	Jacobo Entrerríos		
2021	Madres. Amor y vida	Gabriel	Main cast (season 4)	
2022	Holy Family	Marcos	Main cast (season 1)	
2023	Sky High: The Series	Fernan	Main cast	
2025	The Gardener	Elmer		

=== Film ===
Year	Title	Role	Notes	Ref.
2024	Invasión	Arturo		
