= The Neighbor (TV series) =

Spanish superhero comedy television series

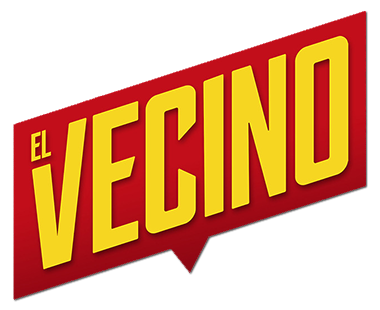
- Logo in Spanish
- Spanish: El Vecino
- Genre: Superhero; Comedy
- Created by: Miguel Esteban; Raúl Navarro
- Based on: El Vecino by Santiago García and Pepo Pérez
- Written by: Miguel Esteban; Raúl Navarro; Carlos de Pando; Sara Antuña
- Directed by: Nacho Vigalondo; Paco Caballero; Ginesta Guindal; Víctor García León; Ernesto Sevilla; Mar Olid; Raúl Navarro
- Starring: Quim Gutiérrez; Clara Lago; Adrián Pino; Catalina Sopelana
- Country of origin: Spain
- Original language: Spanish
- No. of seasons: 2
- No. of episodes: 18

Production
- Executive producers: Carlos de Pando; Sara Antuña; Nahikari Ipiña; Eneko Gutierrez
- Cinematography: Jon D. Domínguez; David Valldepérez; Aritz Cirbián
- Camera setup: Single-camera
- Running time: 25–33 minutes
- Production company: Zeta Audiovisual

Original release
- Network: Netflix
- Release: 31 December 2019 – 22 May 2021

The Neighbor (Spanish: El Vecino) is a Spanish superhero comedy television series, created by Miguel Esteban and Raúl Navarro based on the comic series El Vecino by Santiago García and Pepo Pérez. The series stars Quim Gutiérrez, Clara Lago, Adrián Pino and Catalina Sopelana. It premiered on Netflix on 31 December 2019. In February 2020, the series was renewed for a second and final season, which premiered on 21 May 2021.

== Synopsis ==
The Neighbor follows the story of a hapless man, who one day inadvertently gains a mysterious power. With the help of his friendly neighbor, he begins to master his newfound abilities to fight evil and at the same time, conceal them from the public eye, including his suspicious ex-girlfriend.

== Cast ==
- Quim Gutiérrez as Javier
- Clara Lago as Lola
- Adrián Pino as José Ramón
- Catalina Sopelana as Julia
- Jorge Sanz as Alienígena
- Sergio Momo as Rober
- Paula Malia as Alicia
- Denis Gómez as Camello
- Aníbal Gómez as Adolfo
- Nacho Marraco as Marcelo
- Aitziber Garmendia as Marta
- Fran Perea (season 2)
- Gracia Olayo (season 2)
- Javier Botet (season 2)
- Celia de Molina (season 2)

== Episodes ==
=== Season 1 (2019) ===
No. overall	No. in season	Title	Directed by	Written by	Original release date
1	1	"It Came from Outer Space"	Nacho Vigalondo	Miguel Esteban & Raúl Navarro	31 December 2019
2	2	"The Social Network"	Nacho Vigalondo	Miguel Esteban & Raúl Navarro	31 December 2019
3	3	"Training day"	Paco Caballero	Miguel Esteban & Raúl Navarro	31 December 2019
4	4	"The Insider"	Paco Caballero	Miguel Esteban & Raúl Navarro	31 December 2019
5	5	"Secrets & Lies"	Paco Caballero	Miguel Esteban & Raúl Navarro	31 December 2019
6	6	"The Perfect Storm"	Ginesta Guindal	Miguel Esteban & Raúl Navarro	31 December 2019
7	7	"The Interview"	Ginesta Guindal	Miguel Esteban & Raúl Navarro	31 December 2019
8	8	"The Big Short"	Víctor García León	Miguel Esteban & Raúl Navarro	31 December 2019
9	9	"The Party"	Víctor García León	Miguel Esteban & Raúl Navarro	31 December 2019
10	10	"Colosal"	Víctor García León	Miguel Esteban & Raúl Navarro	31 December 2019

=== Season 2 (2021) ===
No. overall	No. in season	Title	Directed by	Written by	Original release date
11	1	"Tucker"	Ernesto Sevilla	Marc Crehuet, Miguel Esteban & Raúl Navarro	22 May 2021
12	2	"The Olympic Games"	Ernesto Sevilla	Marc Crehuet, Miguel Esteban & Raúl Navarro	22 May 2021
13	3	"Mindfulness"	Víctor García León	Marc Crehuet, Miguel Esteban & Raúl Navarro	22 May 2021
14	4	"Action Figures"	Víctor García León	Miguel Esteban	22 May 2021
15	5	"The Bullring"	Mar Olid	Miguel Esteban	22 May 2021
16	6	"The Ministry"	Raúl Navarro	Miguel Esteban & Raúl Navarro	22 May 2021
17	7	"The Threat"	Víctor García León	Miguel Esteban & Raúl Navarro	22 May 2021
18	8	"Miguelito"	Víctor García León	Miguel Esteban & Raúl Navarro	22 May 2021

== Production ==
=== Development ===
On 6 February 2019, it was announced that Netflix had given the production a series order for a first season consisting of ten episodes. The series was created by Miguel Esteban and Raúl Navarro who are also credited as executive producers. Additional executive producers include Carlos de Pando and Sara Antuña. Production companies involved with the series include Zeta Audiovisual. The first season was released on 31 December 2019. On 20 February 2020, Netflix renewed the series for a second and final season, which premiered worldwide on 21 May 2021. For the second season, the series was directed by Ernesto Sevilla, Raúl Navarro, Víctor García León and Mar Olid and written by Raúl Navarro, Miguel Esteban and Marc Crehuet. Additionally, Josep Gatell and Teresa de Rosendo join as showrunners, with Eneko Gutiérrez credited as an executive produced for the second season.

=== Casting ===
Sometime after the series was ordered by Netflix, it was confirmed that Quim Gutiérrez, Clara Lago, Adrián Pino and Catalina Sopelana would star in the series. On 29 May 2020, it was confirmed that Fran Perea, Gracia Olayo, Javier Botet, and Celia de Molina would join the cast for the second season.

== Release ==
=== Premiere ===
On 15 November 2019, the series held its official premiere with the screening of the first two episodes at the Gijón International Film Festival in Gijón, Spain.

=== Marketing ===
On 15 November 2019, Netflix released the official trailer for the series. On 7 May 2021, Netflix released the official trailer for the second season.
