= Nacho Vigalondo =

Spanish filmmaker

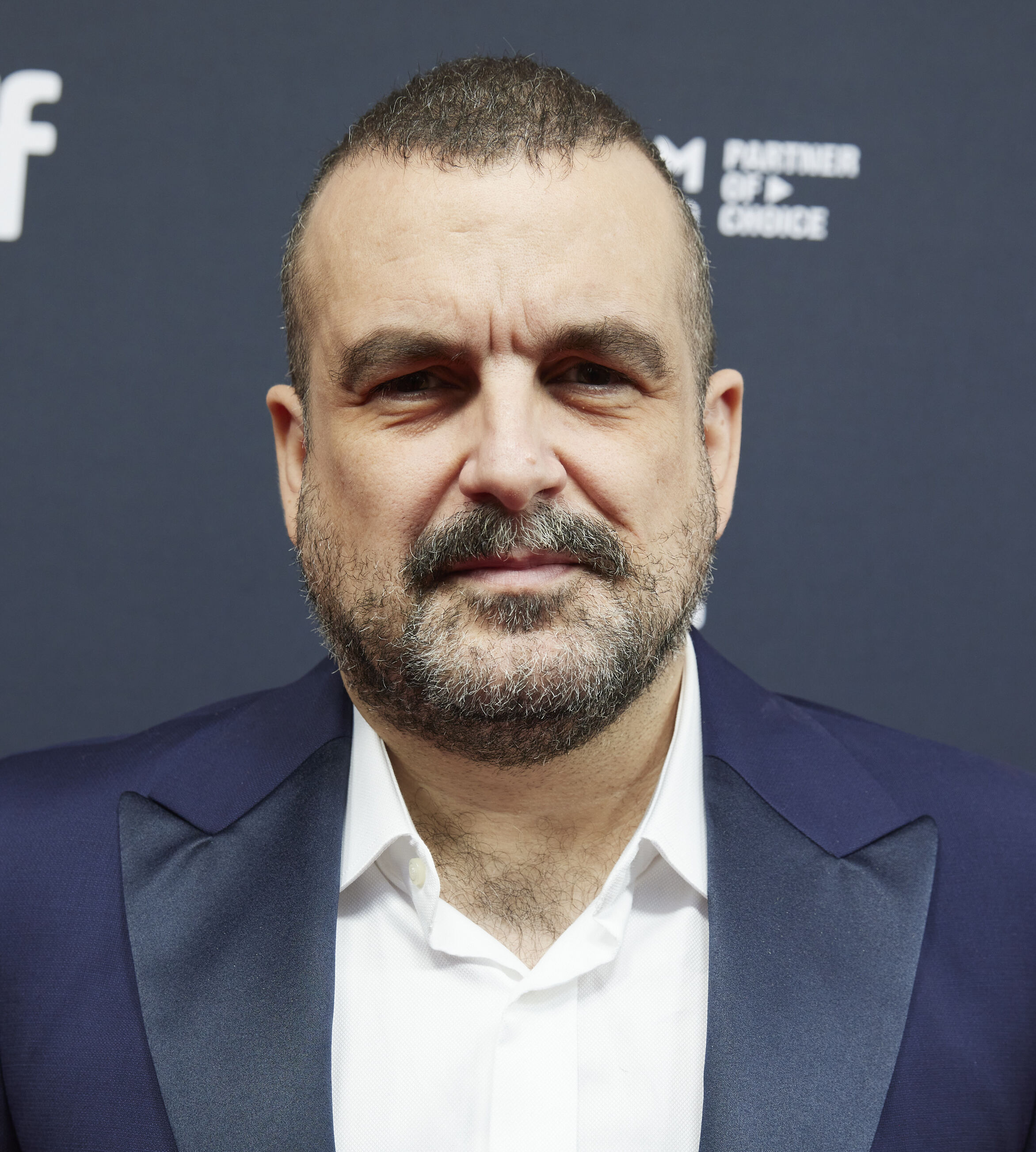
- Vigalondo at the 2024 Toronto International Film Festival
- Born: Ignacio Vigalondo Palacios; 6 April 1977 (age 49); Cabezón de la Sal, Spain
- Occupations: Film director; television director; screenwriter; producer; actor
- Years active: 2002–present

Ignacio "Nacho" Vigalondo Palacios (born 6 April 1977) is a Spanish filmmaker.

== Career ==
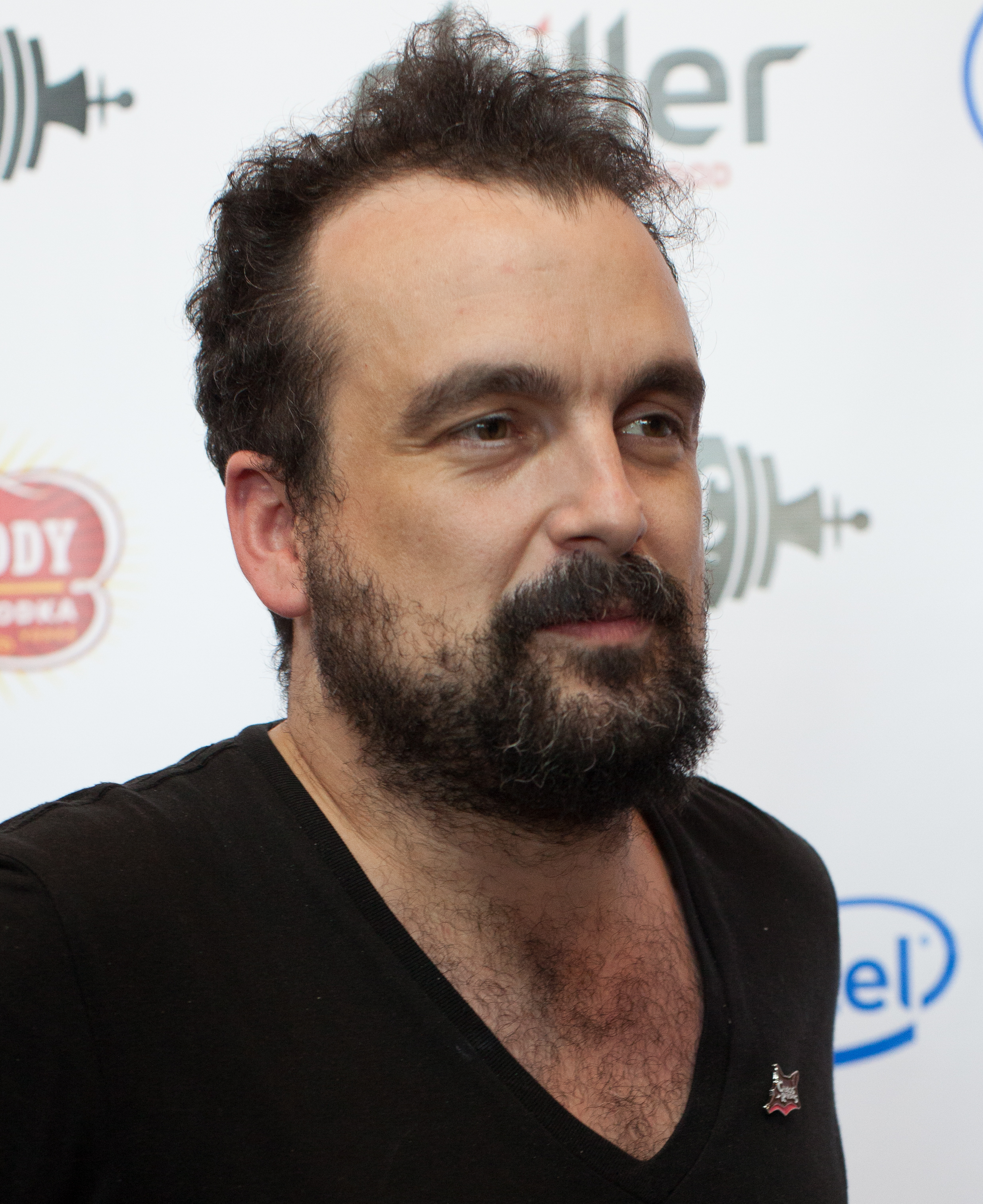
Vigalondo in 2014

Vigalondo's first film was the 2003 Spanish-language short film 7:35 in the Morning, about a suicide bomber who terrorizes a cafe, which was only eight minutes long. The film won significant accolades: it was nominated for an Academy Award for Best Short Film, got another Best Short Film Award nomination at the European Film Awards, and received the Bronze Moon of Valencia at the Cinema Jove – Valencia International Film Festival, and the Prix UIP Drama at the Drama Short Film Festival.

He finished his first full-length feature film, Los Cronocrímenes (English title: Timecrimes), in 2007, in which he also co-starred.

Vigalondo's next film was the 2011 Spanish-language alien invasion film Extraterrestre.

In 2011, it was reported that Vigalondo was recruited to direct a film adaptation of Mark Millar's Supercrooks.

From 2012 to 2014 he wrote and directed a segment in three different anthology horror films: The ABCs of Death, The Profane Exhibit, and VHS: Viral. In 2014 he also released Open Windows, a techno-thriller film that marked his English-language debut.

Vigalondo's wrote and directed the 2016 film Colossal, which is a twist on the Kaiju genre and an homage to the Godzilla franchise. Before starting production on Colossal, Vigalondo described his plan as to make a serious film with "old school" practical effects on a low budget.

Vigalondo's directed the Hulu original film Pooka, released December 2018 in the Into the Dark series.

Vigalondo directed the first two episodes of the first season of the superhero comedy series The Neighbor (released in 2019) and the entire second season of the Ancient-Rome-set comedy series Justo antes de Cristo (released in 2020), as well the episode "La alarma" from season two of anthology horror series Stories to Stay Awake.

== Filmography ==
=== Short film ===
Year	Title	Director	Writer	Notes
2001	Código 7	Yes	Yes	Also cinematographer
2003	7:35 in the Morning	Yes	Yes	Nominated- Academy Award for Best Live Action Short Film
2005	Domingo	Yes	Yes	
2009	Marisa	Yes	Yes	
2012	A is for Apocalypse	Yes	Yes	Segment of The ABCs of Death
2013	Sins of the Fathers	Yes	Yes	Segment of The Profane Exhibit
2014	Parallel Monsters	Yes	Yes	Segment of V/H/S: Viral

Acting roles

Year	Title	Role
2001	Código 7	Tipo
2003	7:35 in the Morning	Tipo

=== Feature film ===
Year	Title	Director	Writer	Producer
2007	Timecrimes	Yes	Yes	No
2011	Extraterrestrial	Yes	Yes	Yes
2014	Open Windows	Yes	Yes	No
2016	Colossal	Yes	Yes	No
2019	Paradise Hills	No	Yes	No
2024	Daniela Forever	Yes	Yes	Yes

Acting roles

Year	Title	Role
2007	Timecrimes	The Scientist
2014	Open Windows	Richy Gabilondo
2015	Camino	Guillermo
2021	El Planeta	Older Man

=== Television ===
Year	Title	Director	Writer	Executive Producer	Notes
2001	Gran hermano	Yes	No	No	9 episodes
2005	Agitación + IVA	Yes	No	No	
2007	Las aventuras galácticas de Jaime de Funes y Arancha	Yes	No	No	TV short
2008-2010	Muchachada Nui	No	Yes	No	3 episodes
2018	Pooka!	Yes	No	No	Segment of Into the Dark
2019-2021	Vigalondo Midnight Madness	No	Yes	No	18 episodes
2020	Los Felices veinte	No	Yes	Yes	
2021	Historias para no dormir	No	Yes	No	Episode "La alarma"
2025	Superestar	Yes	Yes	No	

Acting roles

Year	Title	Role	Notes	Ref.
2020	Veneno	Juan Antonio Canta		
2023	La Mesías			
2023	El otro lado (The Other Side)	Gorka Romero		
2025	Superestar (Superstar)	Joaquín Sardana		

== See also ==
- List of Spanish Academy Award winners and nominees
