= Chicho Ibáñez Serrador =

Spanish director, actor and screenwriter (1935–2019)

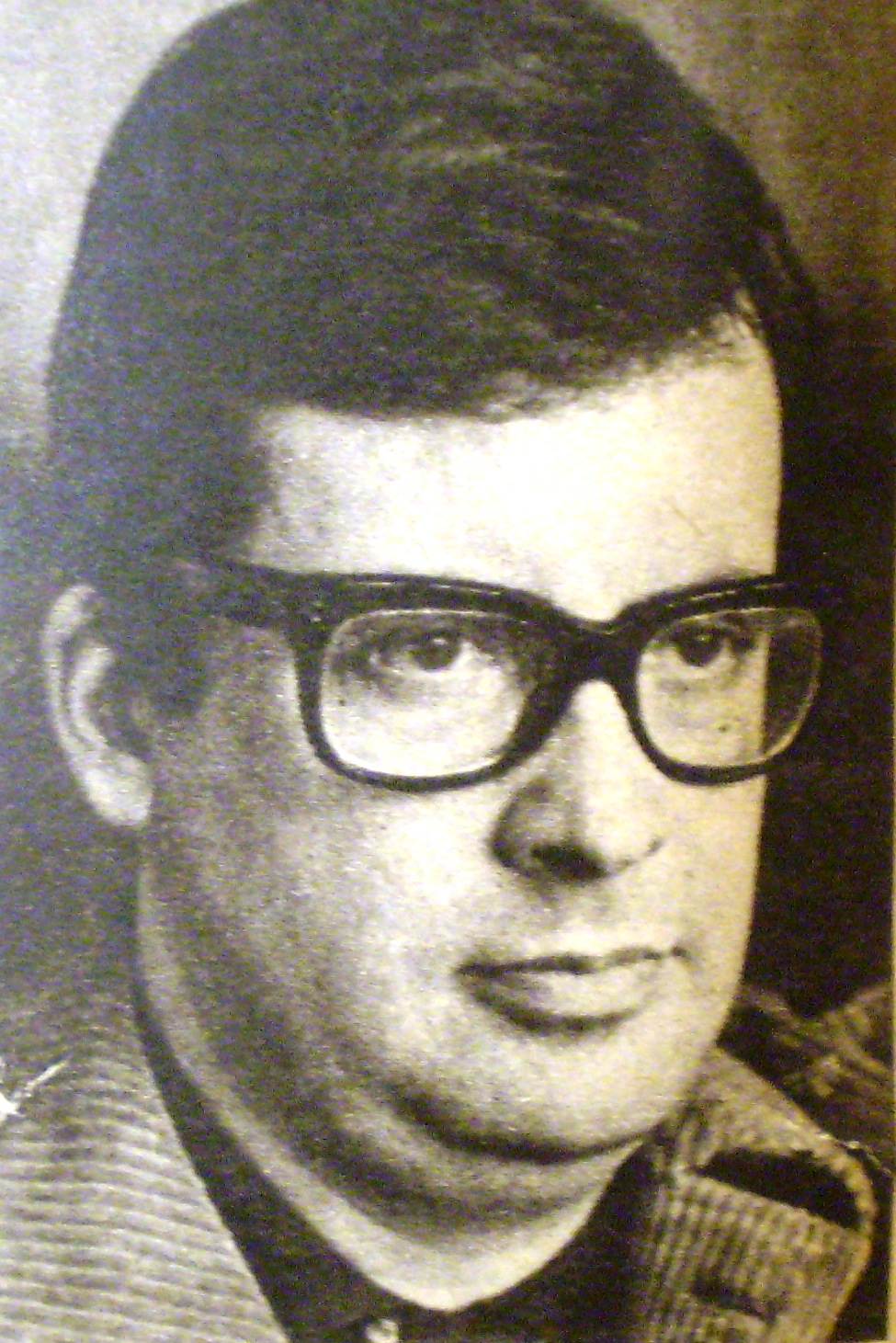
- Born: Narciso Ibáñez Serrador; 4 July 1935; Montevideo, Uruguay
- Died: 7 June 2019 (aged 83); Madrid, Spain
- Other names: Chicho Ibáñez Serrador; Luis Peñafiel
- Occupations: Director, producer, writer
- Parents: Narciso Ibáñez Menta; Pepita Serrador

Narciso Ibáñez Serrador (4 July 1935 – 7 June 2019), also known as Chicho Ibáñez Serrador or by the pen name Luis Peñafiel, was a Spanish television, film and theater director, actor and screenwriter. He received many accolades throughout his career including the Lifetime Achievement Award presented by the Spanish Television Academy in 2002, the National Television Award presented by the Spanish Ministry of Culture in 2010 and the Honorary Goya Award presented by the Spanish Film Academy in 2018.

Some of his credits include the creation and direction of the television shows Historias para no dormir, Historia de la frivolidad, and Un, dos, tres... responda otra vez in Televisión Española, and the writing and direction of the feature films The House That Screamed (1969) and Who Can Kill a Child? (1976).

== Biography ==
Ibáñez Serrador was born in 1935 in Montevideo and from an early age was influenced by the world of acting: his father was the Spanish theatre director and actor Narciso Ibáñez Menta, while his mother was Argentinian actress Pepita Serrador. He spent his childhood in Latin America, accompanying his parents during their tour performances.

In 1947 he moved to Spain, where he attended high school in Salamanca. He began to work with a theatre company and made his director debut with The Glass Menagerie by Tennessee Williams.

In 1963 he began to work in Televisión Española, creating and directing successful shows in Spain like the horror series Historias para no dormir, the special Historia de la frivolidad, and the game show Un, dos, tres... responda otra vez. Ibáñez Serrador originally went uncredited for creating and directing Un, dos, tres... as his father, a successful horror actor, didn't want to be associated with a game show. However, he relented when the show became a runaway hit and viewers wanted to know who had come up with such a successful format, originally receiving the credit of "If something fails, the one responsible is Chicho Ibáñez Serrador". The show ran until 2004.

He later returned to cinema, writing and directing two feature films: The House That Screamed (1969) and Who Can Kill a Child? (1976).

Ibáñez Serrador received the Lifetime Achievement Award presented by the Spanish Television Academy in 2002, the National Television Award presented by the Spanish Ministry of Culture in 2010, the Feroz of Honor at the 4th Feroz Awards in 2017 and the Honorary Goya Award presented by the Spanish Film Academy at the 33rd Goya Awards in 2018.

In 1968, the Ministry of the Navy commissioned him a short film to compete at a festival in Versailles, the short film won an award and the Minister honoured him with the Cross of Naval Merit with white decoration. In 2002, he received the Gold Medal of Merit in the Fine Arts by the Ministry of Culture.

He died on 7 June 2019 from a urinary tract infection at the age of 83.

== In popular media ==
The 2021 episode "Freddy" of Stories to Stay Awake directed by Paco Plaza features a fictional recreation of the filming of the 1982 episode "Freddy" of the original 1966-1983 series Historias para no dormir. The character of Ibáñez is played by Carlos Santos. Paco Plaza portrays Ibáñez Serrador in a cameo role in Saben aquell.

== Honours ==
- Cross of Naval Merit with white decoration (Spain, 1 April 1969).
- Gold Medal of Merit in the Fine Arts (Spain, 15 February 2002).

== Sources ==
- Michael Orlando Yaccarino, La Residencia: An Analysis, in Filmfax (1999)
