= Unax Ugalde =

Spanish-Basque actor (born 1978)

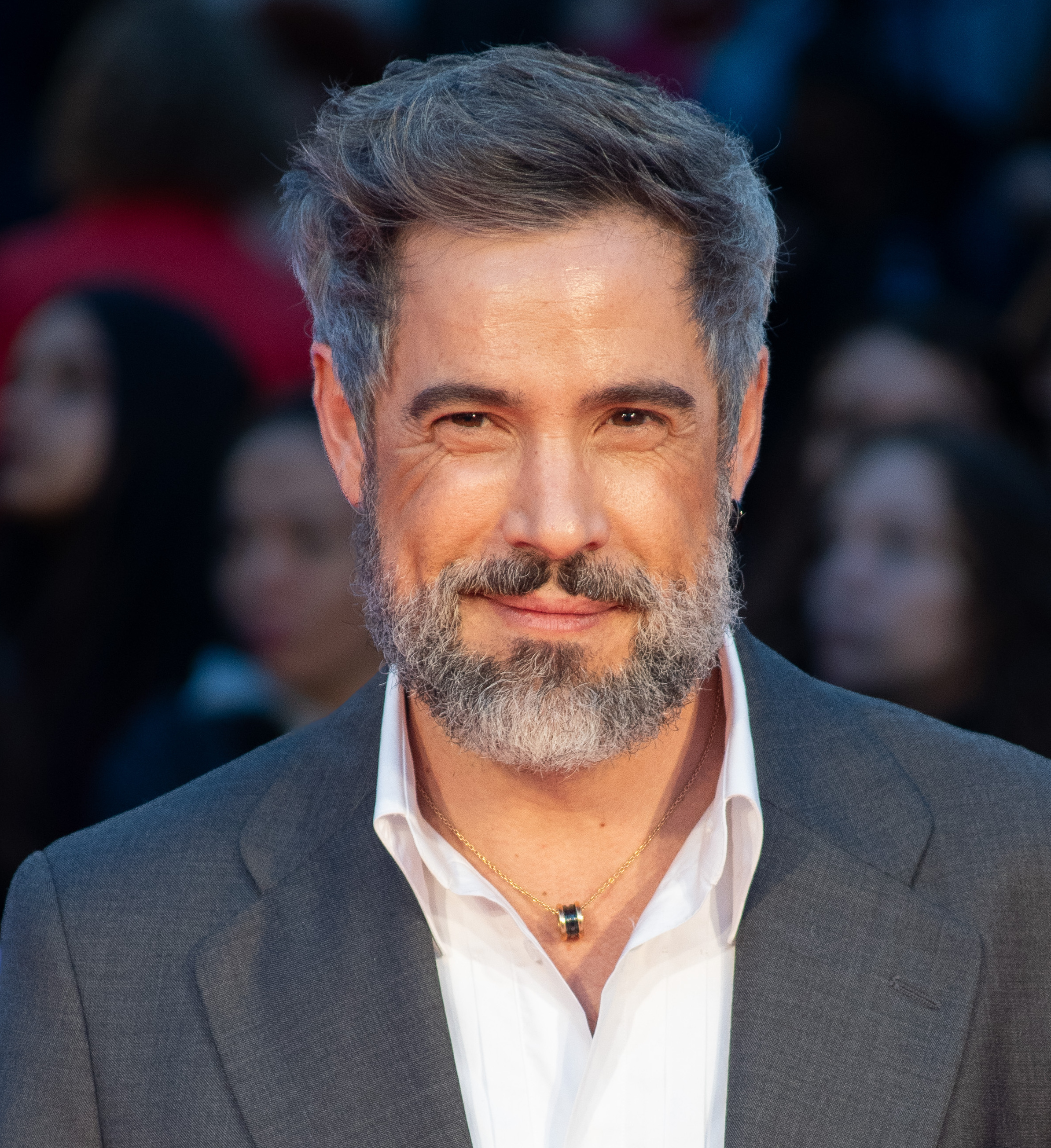
- Unax Ugalde at the 2024 Málaga Film Festival
- Born: Unax Ugalde Gutiérrez; 27 November 1978 (age 47); Vitoria-Gasteiz, Basque Country, Spain
- Occupation: Actor
- Years active: 1998–present
- Height: 1.78 m (5 ft 10 in)
- Spouse: Neus Cerdá (m. 2018)
- Partner: Ingrid Rubio (2005–2012)
- Children: 2

Unax Ugalde Gutiérrez (born 27 November 1978) is a Spanish actor.

== Early life ==
Unax Ugalde Gutiérrez was born on 27 November 1978, in Vitoria-Gasteiz, Basque Country, Spain. He is the son of a worker at the Altos Hornos and a housewife. While a student, he had the ambition of becoming a marine scientist and started taking interpretation classes. In order to pay for his studies, he worked in a supermarket where he dressed up as a chocolate ball. He got his very first job in a TV series named Entre dos fuegos for ETB Basque television. In 1999, he left the Basque Country to start an acting career in Madrid.

== Personal life ==
From 2005 to 2012, Ugalde was in a relationship with the actress Ingrid Rubio.

On 14 October 2018, he married the journalist Neus Cerdá. The actor Asier Etxeandía officiated the wedding. On 27 August 2018, the couple's first child, a boy, was born whom they called Ondei Ugalde Cerdá. On 3 January 2021, the couple's second child, a boy, was born whom they called Marc Ugalde Cerdá.

== Career ==
Ugalde made his debut in the cinema in Fill Me with Life. He then featured in Volverás (2002), playing a good student who is about to leave home, when he met his criminal brother (Tristán Ulloa), thus leaving the "right way" and trying to help him to reach emotional maturity during a night. The same year, Ugalde had a supporting role in the film Bellas durmientes by Eloy Lozano. In 2003, Ugalde starred in the controversial film Diario de una becaria by Josecho San Mateo, director of Ugalde's first film.

That year, he was about to premiere Equus in the theatre, playing the same role for which Peter Firth was nominated for an Oscar: a young aggressive, on the brink of madness, with a great fear of the outside world (similar to the teenager who played in El grupo) who is overcome by shyness and emotional instability. Finally the work was suspended.

However, this failed attempt highlighted the fact that Ugalde was specializing in violent youth with a good heart, as he plays the role of Gorilo in Héctor (Gracia Querejeta, 2004). That year the director Paul Malo, with whom he had worked on a short film, offered him a starring role in Frío sol de invierno. Two months after the release of the latter, Ugalde received a nomination for the Goya Awards for his performance in Héctor, as well as a new nomination in the Unión de Actores Awards.

In 2005, he premiered Queens, in the role of a man about to marry his boyfriend (Daniel Hendler) in the first Spanish gay wedding who could not support his castrating mother. In his next film, Alatriste, he played the son of a fellow of Viggo Mortensen who died in Flanders. While recording he received the news that Daniel Brühl was to play Salvador Puig Antich in Salvador, to the detriment of his own candidacy.

When he completed his role in Alatriste, Ugalde recorded his third international film, this time in English. Miloš Forman asked him to play the brother of Natalie Portman in Goya's Ghosts along with Javier Bardem, Randy Quaid, Stellan Skarsgård, Eusebio Lázaro, Blanca Portillo, José Luis Gómez, Andrés Gértrudix and Fernando Tielve.

He combined the filming of his last two works with the promotion of Shooting Star which led him, among other places, to the Berlin Film Festival and in 2005 to the Festival of Seville.

In 2006, before premiering Alatriste, he filmed Savage Grace with Julianne Moore, playing one of Tony Baekeland's lovers. In 2007, he played a young Florentino Ariza in the film adaptation of the book Love in the Time of Cholera. Then he starred in La buena nueva, in which he plays a priest who spends the Spanish Civil War in the navarrese town of Alsasua and who will witness with horror the atrocities being committed in the name of religion. In this film, Ugalde stars with Guillermo Toledo and fellow Basque actress Barbara Goenaga, among others and is directed by Helena Taberna.

In 2008, Ugalde played the role of Roberto "El Vaquerito" Rodríguez in Che Part 1: The Argentine, the first part of the two-part biopic about Ernesto "Che" Guevara. The film is an American production inspired about Guevara's life during the Cuban Revolution and directed by Steven Soderbergh. In 2010, Ugalde filmed three films: Cefalópodo directed by Rubén Imaz, a Mexican film about overcoming a break-up in a couple; Bon Appétit an opera prima that was directed by David Pinillos and shot in Zurich, Switzerland, and filmed in English, in addition the film won the Goya Award for Best New Director; and finally No controles directed by Borja Cobeaga, Pagafantas's director.

In 2011, Ugalde premiered two films, the first being There Be Dragons, directed by Roland Joffé and based on Josemaría Escrivá de Balaguer's life as a catholic priest and founder of Opus Dei. The film has been the best second of Spanish cinema on its first week-end, the record goes to Torrente 4; the second film is Tequila: Historia de una pasión by Sergio Sánchez Suárez, Ugalde's second role in Mexican cinema. Ugalde shot scenes for a play entitled Olaguílbe 1808 by Patxi Basabe. In addition, Ugalde starred in Baztan by Iñaki Elizalbe, a Spanish film that was shot in Basque. Baztan had its premiere during the 60th San Sebastián International Film Festival, the film garnered positive reviews and critical acclaim. Finally, in december Ugalde premiered TV film El asesinato de Carrero Blanco in ETB and 2012 in TVE.

In 2012, Ugalde starred in Dracula 3D, a horror film directed by Dario Argento, shooting in English, Ugalde plays Jonathan Harker, one of the main protagonists. Dracula 3D was shown during the 65th Cannes Film Festival and the film was greeted with largely mixed reviews from critics. Next year, Ugalde shot two films. The first is Bypass, Ugalde's second raid in Basque language; the other film is Somos gente honrada. In addition, Ugalde joined the cast of the third season of the drama series Gran Reserva.

== Work ==
=== Filmography ===
Film roles
Year	Title	Role	Notes and awards
2000	Báilame el agua (Fill Me with Life)	David	
2001	Mi dulce	Óscar	Turia Award for Best New Actor
2002	Volverás (You'll Be Back)	Ignacio	
2002	Bellas durmientes	Young Lawrence	
2003	Cámara oscura (Deadly Cargo)	Iván	
2003	Diario de una becaria	Marcos	
2004	Héctor	Gorilo	Nominated – Goya Award for Best Supporting Actor; Nominated – Spanish Actors Union Award for Best Performance by an Actor in a Supporting Role
2004	Frío sol de invierno (Cold Winter Sun)	Adrián	Ourense Independent Film Festival Award for Best Actor
2005	Queens	Miguel	
2005	Rosario Tijeras	Antonio	
2006	Goya's Ghosts	Ángel Bilbatúa	
2006	Alatriste	Íñigo Balboa	
2006	Savage Grace	Black Jake Martínez	
2007	La buena nueva (The Good News)	Father Miguel	Toulouse Cinespaña Award for Best Actor; Turia Award for Best Actor; Valladolid International Film Festival, Award for Best Actor; Nominated – Cinema Writers Circle from Spain Award for Best Actor
2007	Love in the Time of Cholera	Young Florentino	
2008	Che Part 1: The Argentine	Roberto "El Vaquerito" Rodríguez	
2010	Cefalópodo	Sebastián	
2010	Bon Appétit	Daniel	Málaga Spanish Film Festival, Silver Biznaga for Best Actor; Nominated – Cinema Writers Circle from Spain Award for Best Actor; Nominated – Spanish Actors Union Award for Best Performance by an Actor in a Leading Role
2010	No controles (Love Storming)	Sergio	
2011	There Be Dragons	Pedro Casciano	
2011	Tequila: Historia de una pasión	Antonio	
2011	Baztan	Joxe	
2011	El asesinato de Carrero Blanco	Arriaga	TV film
2012	Dracula	Jonathan Harker	
2012	Bypass	María's friend	
2012	Somos gente honrada	Luis	
2013	Cásate conmigo	Antonio	
2016	La estrategia del pequines		
2017	Operacion Concha		
2025	Ya no Quedan Junglas	Pallares	
2025	Ingrid		Short film
TBA	The Seville Communion		With Amaia Salamanca, Paul Guylfole, Carlos Cuevas, Jorge Sanz and Paul Freemann
TBA	La Ventana Abierta		Directed by Ana Graciani

=== Short films ===
Year	Film	Director
2001	Jardines deshabitados	Pablo Malo
2003	Tatuaje	Guillermo Ríos
2005	La última página	César Rodríguez-Moroy

=== Television ===
Year	Title	Role	Notes
1998-1999	A las once en casa	Coyote	
1999	Compañeros	Manu	1 episode "¿Lo hiciste por mí?" (Season 4, episode 13)
2000-2001	El grupo	Fidel Ortiz	
2002	7 vidas	Cholo	1 episode "Desafio rural" (Season 5, episode 9)
2008	Cuéntame cómo pasó	Jorge Arias	10 episodes
2013	Gran Reserva	Carlos Cortazar	13 episodes
2018	Periodistas	Mario Pachon	
2018–2020	Vivir sin permiso (Unauthorized Living)	Malcom Souza	
2019	Brigada Costa del Sol (Drug Squad: Costa Del Sol)	Edi	5 episodes
2020	La valla (The Barrier)	Hugo Mujica	13 episodes
2020-2021	Amar es Para Siempre	Gorka	251 episodes
2021	Ana Tramel. El juego	Alejandro Tramel	TV mini series
2021	The Black Castle		
2022	Servir y Proteger	Matias Medina "El Fantasma"	1 episode Episode#1.1210
2023-	Entre Tierras (Between Lands)	Manuel Cervantes	Main Cast
2024	Mary & George	Gondomar	2 episodes
2024	Detective Toureau	Arretxe	6 episodes
2025	Romi	Hector	8 episodes
2026	The Night Manager	Juan Carrascal	5 episodes

=== Play ===
- Olaguílbe 1808

== Prizes ==
Goya Awards

Year	Award	Film	Result
2003	Best Supporting Actor	Héctor	Runner-up

Spanish Actor's Guild

Year	Award	Film	Result
2010	Best film actor in a leading role	Bon Appétit	Runner-up
2004	Best film supporting actor	Héctor	Runner-up
2002	Best TV supporting actor	Periodistas	Runner-up
2000	Best new actor	El grupo	Runner-up

Fotogramas de Plata

Year	Award	Serie	Result
2001	Best TV actor	Periodistas	Nominated

Malaga Film Festival

Year	Award	Serie	Result
2010	Best actor	Bon Appetit	Winner
2004	Best supporting actor	Héctor	Nominated

Ourense Film Festival

Year	Award	'Serie	Result
2004	Best leading actor	Frío sol de invierno	

Viña del Mar Film Festival

Year	Award	Serie	Result
2004	Best leading actor	Frío sol de invierno	

Turia Prize

Year	Award	Serie	Result
2001	Best new actor	Bailame el agua	

Bogart Prize

- Best Basque actor (2001)

Gaztea Sariak

- Best actor (2000)
