= Crazy About Her =

Crazy About Her may refer to:

- "Crazy About Her", a 1988 song by Rod Stewart on the album Out of Order
- Crazy About Her (film), a 2021 Spanish romantic comedy film directed by Dani de la Orden
