= Lander Otaola =

Spanish actor (born 1989)

- Otaola in 2022
- Born: Lander Otaola Arregi; 20 January 1989 (age 37); Barakaldo, Spain
- Education: Escuela de Teatro de Getxo
- Occupation: Actor
- Years active: 2009–present
- Partner: Ylenia Baglietto
- Children: 1

Lander Otaola (born 20 January 1989) is a Spanish actor.

== Biography ==
Otaola was born in Barakaldo, Greater Bilbao. In his youth, he played football for Athletic Bilbao. At the age of 18, he began studying drama at the Escuela de Teatro de Getxo.

He lives between Bilbao and Madrid. He is in a relationship with actress Ylenia Baglietto. He has a son, born in 2025.

== Filmography ==
=== Film ===
Year	Title	Role	Ref.
2009	La máquina de pintar nubes	Mateo	
2009	Zorion perfektua	Young Aitor	
2010	Bon Appétit	Waiter	
2013	Alaba Zintzoa	Imanol	
2014	Spanish Affair	Borroka	
2014	Hiru gezur	Andoni	
2015	Pikadero	Iñaki	
2016	Rendezvous	Operator	
2019	The Little Switzerland	Iker	
2020	Ane Is Missing	Andoni Urtubi	
2021	The Cover	Pierre	
2021	García y García	Waiter	
2022	Two Many Chefs	Ander	
2025	La coleccionista	Abel	
2026	The Harvester	Carlist soldier	
2027	Blanco	TBA	

=== Television ===
Year	Title	Role	Notes	Ref.
2009–2010	Vaya semanita	Various		
2012	Gernika bonbapean	Jesús Mari	2 episodes	
2018	Fugitiva	Edu	9 episodes	
2018–2019	Amar es para siempre	Jon Illarramendi	52 episodes	
2020	Patria	Jokin	3 episodes	
2024	Hay algo en el bosque	Ander	2 episodes	
2024	Detective Touré	Txema	6 episodes	
2025	La coleccionista	Abel	3 episodes	

== Bibliography ==
- Otaola, Lander (2021). Mala persona (in Spanish). Arima Editorial. ISBN 978-8412323412.
