= Iván Pellicer =

Spanish actor (born 1997)

Iván Pellicer (born 1997) is a Spanish actor best known for playing Abel in the Netflix series Holy Family. He also stars as Marqués in Paradise and a supporting character in Netflix's series-short Elite.

== Life ==
Pellicer was born in 1997 in Murcia, Spain. As a child, he played hockey. He moved with his mother to Madrid while studying for his bachelor's degree. Originally, Pellicer wanted to be a marine biologist but he later studied acting at Juan Codina and Leticia Santafé.

Pellicer's first acting role was in Fugitiva. In 2018, he was in the film, Animas. In 2020, he was in the short film, A Ninguna Parte. He played Marqués in Paradise. He starred in the Netflix series Holy Family.

== Filmography ==
=== Films ===
Year	Title	Role	Notes
2018	Animas	Abraham	
2020	A Ninguna Parte	Miguel	Short
2021	El joven Diego	Diego	Short
2022	Matar a la madre	Noa	Short
2022	Inutil	Tito	Short
2023	Killer Book Club	Fernando "Nando" Aguado	Main cast
2024	Disco, Ibiza, Locomía	Manolo	

=== Series ===
Year	Title	Role	Notes
2018	Fugitiva	Rubén Guzmán Escudero	Main cast; 9 episodes
2021	Elite Short Stories: Patrick	Beni	Main cast; 3 episodes
2021-2022	Paraíso	«El Marqués»	Collaboration special; 5 episodes
2022-2023	Sagrada Familia	Abel Martínez	Main cast; 16 episodes
2024	Querer	Jon Gorosmendi	Main cast; 4 episodes

== Awards and nominations ==
Award	Date of ceremony	Category	Title	Result	Ref.
Feroz Awards	25 January 2025	Best Supporting Actor in a Series	Querer	Pending	
