= Mikel Bustamante =

Spanish actor and filmmaker (born 1986)

- Bustamante in 2025
- Born: Mikel Bustamante Bedmar; 1986 (age 39–40); Amurrio, Álava, Spain
- Education: Centre d'Estudis Cinematogràfics de Catalunya; Instituto del Cine Madrid
- Occupations: Actor; director; screenwriter
- Years active: 2010–present
- Website: mikelbustamante.com

Mikel Bustamante Bedmar (born 1986) is a Spanish actor, director, and screenwriter.

== Biography ==
Bustamante was born in Amurrio, Álava. At the age of three, he and his family moved to Vitoria-Gasteiz, where he grew up. In 2006, he moved to Barcelona to study film direction, sound, and editing at the Centre d'Estudis Cinematogràfics de Catalunya. He later moved to Madrid to study acting at the Instituto del Cine Madrid.

=== Personal life ===
Bustamante is based in Madrid. He is in a relationship with his longtime collaborator, María Algora.

== Filmography ==
=== As actor ===
==== Film ====
Year	Title	Role	Ref.
2021	Maixabel	Patxi Makazaga	
2022	Lullaby	Javi	
2026	This Solitude	Harkaitz	
2027	Blanco	Miguel Ángel Blanco	

==== Television ====
Year	Title	Role	Notes	Ref.
2018	Acacias 38	Don Javier Abescál	12 episodes	
2019–2021	Money Heist	Martínez	15 episodes	

=== Other credits ===
Year	Title	Director	Writer	Notes	Ref.
2019	Telekinesis	Yes	Yes	Short film; co-written and directed with María Algora	
2020	Caníbales	Yes	Yes	Short film	
2022	La nadadora	No	Yes	Short film; co-written with María Algora	
2022	Lugar de nacimiento	Yes	Yes	Short film; co-written with María Algora	
2025	Lo que no se ve	Yes	Yes	Short film; co-written and directed with María Algora	

== Awards and nominations ==
Award	Year	Category	Nominated work	Result	Ref.
Actors and Actresses Union Awards	2023	Best New Actor	Lullaby	Nominated	
Goya Awards	2023	Best New Actor	Lullaby	Nominated	
