= Two Many Chefs =

- Theatrical release poster
- Spanish: La vida padre
- Directed by: Joaquín Mazón
- Screenplay by: Joaquín Oristrell
- Produced by: Fernando Bovaira; Urko Errazquin
- Starring: Karra Elejalde; Enric Auquer; Megan Montaner; Lander Otaola; Maribel Salas; Gorka Aguinagalde; Manuel Burque
- Cinematography: Ángel Iguácel
- Music by: Vicente Ortiz Gimeno
- Production companies: MOD Pictures; MOD Producciones; Kowalski Films; Lavipa Films AIE
- Distributed by: Paramount Pictures
- Release dates: 8 September 2022 (Guggenheim Museum Bilbao); 16 September 2022 (Spain)
- Country: Spain
- Language: Spanish

Two Many Chefs (Spanish: La vida padre) is a 2022 Spanish comedy film directed by Joaquín Mazón from a screenplay by Joaquín Oristrell. It stars Enric Auquer and Karra Elejalde along with Megan Montaner.

== Plot ==
The fiction takes place in Bilbao. Mikel, a young cook, meets with his father Juan, who had been missing for 30 years. While trying to keep his restaurant afloat, Mikel has to take care of crazed Juan, a former cook who suffers from a mental condition that prevents him from recognizing neither the aforementioned time gap nor his son Mikel.

== Cast ==
- Karra Elejalde as Juan
- Enric Auquer as Mikel
- Megan Montaner as Nagore
- Lander Otaola
- Maribel Salas
- Gorka Aguinagalde
- Manuel Burque

== Production ==
The screenplay was penned by Joaquín Oristrell. It was produced by MOD Pictures, MOD Producciones, Kowalski Films and Lavipa Films, with participation by Movistar+, RTVE, and ETB. It was shot in Bilbao.

== Release ==
The film made its world premiere at the Guggenheim Museum Bilbao on 8 September 2022. Distributed by Paramount Pictures Spain, it was theatrically released in Spain on 16 September 2022.

== Reception ==
Marta Medina of El Confidencial deemed the film to be "a gentle comedy with a touch of drama and emotion" delivering the audience "an hour and a half of endearing entertainment with little more pretension than to entertain and move".

Raquel Hernández Luján of HobbyConsolas rated the film 67 out of 100 points ("acceptable"), highlighting the lead duo featuring awesome chemistry, considering that, barring a couple of tonally misplaced gags that are not funny at all, the film meets its purpose, otherwise also featuring a good closure.

Pablo Vázquez of Fotogramas rated it 3 out of 5 stars, considering the balance achieved between laughter and disenchantment to be commendable, highlighting the lead duo of Elejalde and Auquer as the best thing about the film, whilst citing as flaws elements such as the dull love subplot and the limited play gotten out of the supporting cast.

Andrea G. Bermejo of Cinemanía rated it 3 out of 5 stars, deeming Auquer and Elejalde to be the "main dish" of the 'feel-good' movie.

Manuel J. Lombardo of Diario de Sevilla rated the film 3 out of 5 stars, assessing the film to be an oedipal situational comedy with the haute cuisine as a parodical backdrop and an estupendous Karra Elejalde as the main show.

== See also ==
- List of Spanish films of 2022
