= Holy Family (TV series) =

Thriller drama television series

- Promotional release poster
- Spanish: Sagrada familia
- Created by: Manolo Caro
- Written by: Manolo Caro; Fernando Pérez; María Miranda
- Starring: Najwa Nimri; Alba Flores; Álex García; Macarena Gómez; Carla Campra; Iván Pellicer; Ella Kweku; Álvaro Rico; Jon Olivares; Laura Laprida; Nicolás Illoro
- Theme music composer: Lucas Vidal
- Original language: Spanish
- No. of seasons: 2
- No. of episodes: 16

Production
- Production company: Noc Noc Cinema

Original release
- Network: Netflix
- Release: 14 October 2022 – 17 November 2023

Holy Family (Spanish: Sagrada familia) is a thriller drama television series created by Manolo Caro for Netflix. It stars Najwa Nimri and Alba Flores alongside Macarena Gómez, Ella Kweku, Carla Campra, Álex García, Iván Pellicer, and Álvaro Rico. It received a streaming release on 14 October 2022. It was renewed for a second and final season on 15 November 2022 which premiered on 17 November 2023.

== Plot ==
The plot starts in Melilla in 1998. It later moves to the wealthy Madrid neighbourhood of Fuente del Berro. The friendships forged between different women (all mothers) are upended by the haunted past of a new arrival to the neighbourhood, Gloria, a purported single mother living with her son and her childminder Aitana.

== Cast ==
- Najwa Nimri as Gloria Román / Julia Santos
- Alba Flores as Caterina / Edurne
- Carla Campra as Aitana Martínez / Mariana Santos
- Macarena Gómez as Blanca
- Ella Kweku as Alicia
- Álex García as Germán
- Iván Pellicer as Abel Martínez / Eduardo Santos
- Álvaro Rico as Marcos
- Jon Olivares as Pedro Olivares Simón
- Laura Laprida as Natalia
- Nicolás Illoro
- Miguel Ángel Solá as Fernando Alberche
- Javier Pereira as Chino
- Abril Zamora
- Daniel Grao

== Production ==
Created by Manolo Caro, the series was written by Caro alongside Fernando Pérez and María Miranda. It is a Noc Noc cinema production. Shooting locations included Madrid and Melilla.

Filming for the second season wrapped on 17 February 2023.

== Release ==
The 8-episode first season was released on 14 October 2022. It was renewed for a second season on 15 November 2022. In July 2023, it was revealed that the 8-episode second season would be its last and was released on 17 November 2023.

== Accolades ==
Year	Award	Category	Nominee(s)	Result	Ref.
2024	35th GLAAD Media Awards	Outstanding Spanish-Language Scripted Television Series		Nominated	
