= Detective Touré =

Spanish police procedural television series

- Created by: David Pérez Sañudo; Carlos Vila
- Based on: Detective Touré by Jon Arretxe
- Written by: David Pérez Sañudo; Carlos Vila; Flora González Villanueva
- Directed by: Esteban Crespo; Violeta Salama
- Starring: Malcolm Treviño-Sitté; Itziar Ituño; Unax Ugalde; Loreto Mauleón; Itsaso Arana; Urko Olazabal; Gorsy Edú; Emilio Buale; Goize Blanco; Lander Otaola; Ayoub El Hilali; Jon Olivares; Ane Gabarain
- Country of origin: Spain
- Original languages: Spanish; Basque; French

Production
- Production companies: Tornasol Media; DeAPlaneta

Original release
- Network: RTVE; EITB
- Release: 1 February 2024

Detective Touré is Basque-Spanish police procedural comedy television series based on the same-titled book series by Jon Arretxe.

== Premise ==
Touré, an immigrant from Guinea who settles in the San Francisco neighborhood in Bilbao, faces challenges and mysteries of various kinds, while using his wit and personality to solve each case that comes his way in the most creative and unexpected way possible.

== Cast ==
- Malcolm Treviño-Sitté
- Itziar Ituño
- Unax Ugalde
- Loreto Mauleón
- Itsaso Arana
- Urko Olazabal
- Gorsy Edú
- Emilio Buale
- Goize Blanco
- Lander Otaola
- Ayoub El Hilali
- Jon Olivares
- Ane Gabarain

== Production ==
Filming took place in Bilbao between June 2023 and September 2023.

== Release ==
EITB released the series on Primeran on 1 February 2024. La 1 is airing the series on a weekly basis from 6 November 2024.
