= Blanco (film) =

2027 film by Félix Viscarret

- Spanish teaser poster
- Directed by: Félix Viscarret
- Starring: Mikel Bustamante; Eneko Sagardoy; Jon Ander Urresti; Natalia Huarte; Carlos Scholz; Lander Otaola; Miguel Garcés; David Lorente; Susana Abaitua; Urko Olazabal; Amaia Aberasturi; Israel Elejalde; Ramón Barea
- Production companies: Nadie es Perfecto; Euskadi Movie
- Distributed by: Universal Pictures
- Release date: 9 July 2027 (Spain)
- Country: Spain
- Budget: €8 million

Blanco is an upcoming film directed by Félix Viscarret. Starring Mikel Bustamante as Miguel Ángel Blanco, it dramatizes Blanco's kidnapping and assassination by ETA in 1997. It is slated to be released theatrically in Spain on 9 July 2027.

== Cast ==
- Mikel Bustamante as Miguel Ángel Blanco, a councillor of Ermua and member of the People's Party
- Eneko Sagardoy as Jon Sistiaga, a journalist
- Jon Ander Urresti as Jimi Guerra, a journalist
- Natalia Huarte
- Carlos Scholz
- Lander Otaola
- Miguel Garcés as Carlos Totorika, the mayor of Ermua
- David Lorente
- Susana Abaitua
- Urko Olazabal
- Amaia Aberasturi
- Israel Elejalde
- Ramón Barea
- Elisabeth Larena
- Ainhoa Larrañaga

== Production ==
The film was announced in May 2026. In October 2026, it was announced that Mikel Bustamante would play Miguel Ángel Blanco, with Susana Abaitua, Urko Olazabal, Amaia Aberasturi, Miguel Garcés, David Lorente, Israel Elejalde, Ramón Barea, Eneko Sagardoy, Jon Ander Urresti, Natalia Huarte, Carlos Scholz, and Lander Otaola also joining the cast.

Principal photography began on 19 October 2026. Filming will take place across various locations in the Basque Country.

== Release ==
The film is slated for a theatrical release in Spain on 9 July 2027, coinciding with the 30th anniversary of Blanco's kidnapping.
