= Last Monkey Standing =

- Theatrical release poster
- Spanish: El último mono
- Directed by: Joaquín Mazón Lacasa
- Screenplay by: Joaquín Oristrell; Yolanda García Serrano
- Produced by: Fernando Bovaira; Urko Errazquin; Juan Dávila
- Starring: Juan Dávila; Susana Abaitua; Conchi Espejo; Óscar Lasarte; Sergio Jiménez; Jany Collado; Xavi Francés; Paula García Sabio
- Cinematography: Carlos Cebrián
- Edited by: Jani Madrileño
- Music by: Marina Alcantud Gayà
- Production companies: MOD Producciones; Misent Producciones; MOD Pictures; Pecaneta Producciones
- Distributed by: Buena Vista International
- Release dates: 3 June 2026 (TEA); 7 August 2026 (Spain)
- Running time: 85 minutes
- Country: Spain
- Language: Spanish

Last Monkey Standing (Spanish: El último mono) is a 2026 Spanish comedy film directed by Joaquín Mazón and written by Joaquín Oristrell and Yolanda García Serrano. It stars Juan Dávila and Susana Abaitua.

== Plot ==
The plot follows manosphere guru Alejandro as he sets himself the challenge of wooing feminist writer Mariela, who is in Valencia for the promotion of her last book Neruda, cállate tú.

== Cast ==
- Susana Abaitua as Mariela
- Juan Dávila as Alejandro
- Conchi Espejo
- Óscar Lasarte
- Xavi Francés
- Paula García Sabio

== Production ==
The film was produced by MOD Producciones, MOD Pictures, Misent Producciones, and Pecaneta Producciones and it had the participation of RTVE, Movistar Plus+, and À Punt.

It was shot in Valencia. The city centre served as the set for the filming of a fictional IWD demonstration.

== Release ==
The film's premiere was programmed for 3 June 2026 at the Tenerife Espacio de las Artes (TEA) cultural space as a part of the Lo Que Viene (LQV) festival. Distributed by Buena Vista International, it is scheduled to be released theatrically in Spain on 7 August 2026. Film Factory secured international sales.

== Reception ==
Raquel Hernández Luján of HobbyConsolas gave the film a 50-point rating, warning that the manosphere is terrifying, not funny, and lamenting how the film chooses an issue "that leaves little room for jokes and shows no desire to develop it further; entailing a mere backdrop for a romantic comedy we have seen a thousand times before".

Juan Pando of Fotogramas rated the film 4 out of 5 stars, highlighting how Abaitua is "captivating in a comedic role she nails perfectly".

In a 2-star rating, Manuel J. Lombardo of Diario de Sevilla concluded that the film "neither educates nor, much less, re-educates. It barely entertains, and you can see it coming a mile away.

== See also ==
- List of Spanish films of 2026
