= The Bus of Life =

- Theatrical release poster
- Spanish: El bus de la vida
- Directed by: Ibon Cormenzana
- Written by: Eduard Sola Guerrero; Ibon Cormenzana
- Produced by: Ibon Cormenzana; Ignasi Estapé; Sandra Tapia Díaz; Ángel Durández
- Starring: Dani Rovira; Susana Abaitua; Pablo Scapigliati; Andrés Gertrúdix; Elena Irureta
- Cinematography: Albert Pascual
- Edited by: David Gallart
- Music by: Paula Olaz
- Production companies: Arcadia Motion Pictures; Aixerrota Films; Pachacamac Films; Noodles Production
- Distributed by: A Contracorriente Films (es)
- Release date: 3 July 2024 (Spain)
- Running time: 98 minutes
- Countries: Spain; France
- Language: Spanish

The Bus of Life (Spanish: El bus de la vida) is a 2024 comedy-drama film directed by Ibon Cormenzana which stars Dani Rovira, Susana Abaitua, Pablo Scapigliati, Andrés Gertrúdix, and Elena Irureta.

== Plot ==
Music teacher Andrés moves to the Basque Country, where he is diagnosed with cancer. To travel to the hospital in Bilbao to receive treatment, he regularly uses an old bus driven by Mai that transports him and other cancer patients free of charge. By means of the new experiences on the bus, Andrés manages to overcome the stage fright that has frustrated him before.

== Cast ==
- Dani Rovira as Andrés
- Susana Abaitua as Mai
- Pablo Scapigliati as Unai
- Andrés Gertrúdix as Víctor
- Elena Irureta as Manuela
- Antonio Durán "Morris" as Santi
- Amancay Gaztañaga as Itziar
- Julen Castillo as David
- Roberto Álamo as Max
- José Ramón Soroiz as Patxi
- Miriam Rubio as Clara
- Iria del Río

== Production ==
The film was produced by Arcadia Motion Pictures, Aixerrota Films and Pachacamac Films alongside Noodles Production, with the participation of Amazon, ETB, and TVC and backing from ICAA and the Basque Government. Shooting locations included Orduña-Urduña, Biscay. Original songs by Manuela Vellés, Kase.O, Los Chikos del Maíz, Fito & Fitipaldis, Chill Mafia, and Rigoberta Bandini were added to the film.

== Release ==
Distributed by A Contracorriente Films, The Bus of Life is scheduled to be released theatrically in Spain on 3 July 2024. FilmSharks acquired world sales rights outside of Spain.

== Accolades ==
Year	Award	Category	Nominee(s)	Result	Ref.
2025	4th Carmen Awards	Best Actor	Dani Rovira	Nominated	

== See also ==
- List of Spanish films of 2024
