= El cuento del lobo =

- Theatrical release poster
- Directed by: Norberto López Amado
- Written by: Norberto Lopez Amado
- Based on: Duda razonable by Borja Ortiz de Gondra
- Produced by: Eduardo Campoy; Adolfo Blanco; Raúl Berdonés; Pablo Jimeno
- Starring: Daniel Grao; Lucía Jiménez; Paco Tous; María Romanillos
- Cinematography: Néstor Calvo
- Edited by: Fernando Guariniello
- Music by: Pedro Navarrete
- Production companies: Álamo Producciones Audiovisuales; Secuoya Studios; A Contracorriente Films
- Distributed by: A Contracorriente Films
- Release dates: 17 November 2024 (Huelva); 16 May 2025 (Spain)
- Country: Spain
- Language: Spanish

El cuento del lobo is a 2024 Spanish psychological thriller film written and directed by Norberto López Amado based on the play Duda razonable by Borja Ortiz de Gondra. It stars Daniel Grao, Lucía Jiménez, Paco Tous, and María Romanillos.

== Plot ==
Olga and Javier (a middle-class couple) decide to involve in the affairs of the girl cleaning up their house (Lucía) as she is receiving threatening messages in her mobile phone, only for Lucía's father to come in warning them to stay away from matters that do not concern them. The situation imperils Olga and Javier's relationship.

== Cast ==
- Daniel Grao as Javier
- Lucía Jiménez as Olga
- María Romanillos as Lucía
- Paco Tous as padre de Lucía ('Lucía's father')

== Production ==
El cuento del lobo is an adaptation of the stage work Duda razonable by Borja Ortiz de Gondra. The film is an Álamo Producciones Audiovisuales and Secuoya Studios production alongside A Contracorriente Films. Shooting locations included Tenerife.

== Release ==
For its world premiere, the film was presented at the 50th Huelva Ibero-American Film Festival in November 2024. Distributed by A Contracorriente Films, it is scheduled to be released theatrically in Spain on 16 May 2025.

== Reception ==
Raquel Hernández Luján of HobbyConsolas gave the film 50 points ('so-so'), lamenting that the denouement is self-explanatory and simple on the one hand, and in other respects, blatantly lazy.

== See also ==
- List of Spanish films of 2025
