= Guilty Attraction =

- Film poster
- Spanish: Desmontando a Lucía
- Directed by: Alberto Utrera
- Screenplay by: Alberto Utrera
- Starring: Susana Abaitua; Hugo Silva; Julián Villagrán; Rodrigo Poisón
- Cinematography: Miguel Ángel García Rosado
- Edited by: Alberto Utrera; Mariano Martínez
- Production company: Garajonay Producciones
- Distributed by: Tripictures
- Release date: 29 November 2024
- Country: Spain
- Language: Spanish

Guilty Attraction (Spanish: Desmontando a Lucía) is a 2024 Spanish comedy-drama thriller film written and directed by Alberto Utrera starring Susana Abaitua alongside Hugo Silva and Julián Villagrán.

== Plot ==
Independent expert witness Simón is charged by associate Óliver with investigating amnesic suspect Lucía, involved in the disappearance of two people (boyfriend Héctor and best friend Elena) after the three of them were having a weekend at the beach. Obsessed with noir films, Simón falls for Lucía.

== Cast ==
- Susana Abaitua as Lucía
- Hugo Silva as Simón
- Julián Villagrán as Óliver
- Rodrigo Poisón
- Sandra Ortueta as Elena
- Edu Rejón as Jorge
- Álvaro Lafora as Héctor

== Production ==
The film was produced by Garajonay Producciones. Carlota Amor, Fede Pajaro, and Juanjo Amor served as executive producers. The helmers of the film explained that it was structured in three narrative levels: the real world, Lucía's memories, and Simón's fantasies, with each underpinning the film's visual universe.

It was shot in between Madrid and Gran Canaria.

== Release ==
Distributed by Tripictures, it was released theatrically in Spain on 29 November 2024.

== Reception ==
Enid Román Almansa of Cinemanía rated the film 3 out of 5 stars, writing that what the director Utrera crafted "is a bit crazy, but easily enjoyable, even if the plot is far from simple".

Javier Ocaña of El País wrote that the film "is not perfect, nor does it have to be, but its cinephile grace, its commitment to genre and its unprejudiced and different tone" put the film in the picture along with the best [films] of the year.

== See also ==
- List of Spanish films of 2024
