= Maixabel =

- Poster
- Directed by: Icíar Bollaín
- Written by: Icíar Bollaín; Isa Campo
- Produced by: Koldo Zuazua; Juan Moreno; Guillermo Sempere
- Starring: Blanca Portillo; Luis Tosar; Bruno Sevilla; Urko Olazabal; María Cerezuela
- Cinematography: Javier Agirre Erauso
- Edited by: Nacho Ruiz Capillas
- Music by: Alberto Iglesias
- Production companies: Kowalski Films; Feelgood Media
- Distributed by: Buena Vista International
- Release dates: September 18, 2021 (SSIFF); September 24, 2021 (Spain)
- Running time: 115 minutes
- Country: Spain
- Language: Spanish

Maixabel (Basque pronunciation: [mai'ʃaβel]) is a 2021 Spanish drama film directed by Icíar Bollaín and co-written by Bollaín and Isa Campo. The film stars Blanca Portillo and Luis Tosar alongside Bruno Sevilla, Urko Olazabal and María Cerezuela and is based on the true story of Maixabel Lasa, a woman whose husband, Juan María Jáuregui, was killed by ETA, a Basque separatist group, and who receives an invitation to talk with the killers of her husband eleven years after.

== Plot ==
Maixabel Lasa loses her husband, Juan María Jáuregui, in 2000 at the hands of the ETA. She later becomes director of the Basque office for terrorism victims. Jáuregui's killers have been sentenced to prison where they start to reject violence. Eleven years later, she receives an invitation for an interview from one of the killers of her husband, who is serving his sentence in a jail at Nanclares de la Oca in Álava, after cutting his ties with the terrorist group. Despite doubts and immense pain, Maixabel accepts the invitation and comes face to face with the man who took her husband's life.

== Cast ==
- Blanca Portillo as Maixabel Lasa
- Luis Tosar as Ibon Etxezarreta
- Bruno Sevilla as Luichi
- Urko Olazabal as Luis Carrasco
- María Cerezuela as María
- Mikel Bustamante as Patxi Makazaga

== Production ==
The concept for the film came from the producers, Koldo Zuazua and Juan Moreno, who received a proposal to tell the story of Maixabel Lasa alongside screenwriter Isa Campo in 2018. The film was produced by Kowalski Films and FeelGood, and it had the participation of EiTB, TVE, and Movistar+, support from ICAA, the Basque Government, Diputación Foral de Gipuzkoa, and the collaboration of the Gipuzkoa Film Commission. It was shot in various locations of Gipuzkoa and Álava in the Basque Country, Spain. The music for the film was composed by Alberto Iglesias, Javier Agirre Erauso was the cinematographer and Mikel Serrano was the production designer, other credits includes Alazne Ameztoy (sound), Clara Bilbao (costumes), Karmele Soler (make-up), Sergio Pérez (hairsytling) and Nacho Ruiz Capillas (editing).

== Release ==
The film screened at the 69th San Sebastián International Film Festival of 2021. Distributed by Buena Vista International, it was released in cinemas in Spain on September 24, 2021.

== Reception ==
On review aggregator website Rotten Tomatoes, the film holds an approval rating of 100% based on 6 reviews, with an average rating of 7.30. Juan Pando of Fotogramas rated the film four out of five stars writing that "Bollaín demonstrates a masterful command of her craft in this, her most well-rounded film". Jonathan Holland from Screendaily commented that the film is "a beautifully judged and sensitive exploration of the emotional fallout of terrorism".

== Accolades ==
Year	Award	Category	Nominee(s)	Result	Ref.
2021	27th Forqué Awards	Best Film		Nominated	
2021	27th Forqué Awards	Best Film Actress	Blanca Portillo	Won	
2021	27th Forqué Awards	Best Film Actor	Luis Tosar	Nominated	
2021	27th Forqué Awards	Best Film Actor	Urko Olazabal	Nominated	
2021	27th Forqué Awards	Cinema and Education in Values		Won	
2022	9th Feroz Awards	Best Drama Film	Koldo Zuazua, Juan Moreno, Guillermo Sempere	Won	
2022	9th Feroz Awards	Best Director	Icíar Bollaín	Nominated	
2022	9th Feroz Awards	Best Actor (film)	Luis Tosar	Nominated	
2022	9th Feroz Awards	Best Actress (film)	Blanca Portillo	Nominated	
2022	9th Feroz Awards	Best Supporting Actor (film)	Urko Olazabal	Won	
2022	9th Feroz Awards	Best Screenplay	Isa Campo, Icíar Bollaín	Nominated	
2022	9th Feroz Awards	Best Original Soundtrack	Alberto Iglesias	Nominated	
2022	9th Feroz Awards	Best Trailer	Rafa Martínez	Nominated	
2022	77th CEC Medals	Best Film		Nominated	
2022	77th CEC Medals	Best Director	Icíar Bollaín	Nominated	
2022	77th CEC Medals	Best Actor	Luis Tosar	Nominated	
2022	77th CEC Medals	Best Actress	Blanca Portillo	Won	
2022	77th CEC Medals	Best Supporting Actor	Urko Olazábal	Won	
2022	77th CEC Medals	Best Original Screenplay	Icíar Bollaín, Isa Campo	Nominated	
2022	77th CEC Medals	Best Editing	Nacho Ruiz Capillas	Nominated	
2022	77th CEC Medals	Best Score	Alberto Iglesias	Nominated	
2022	36th Goya Awards	Best Film	Maixabel	Nominated	
2022	36th Goya Awards	Best Director	Icíar Bollaín	Nominated	
2022	36th Goya Awards	Best Actor	Luis Tosar	Nominated	
2022	36th Goya Awards	Best Actress	Blanca Portillo	Won	
2022	36th Goya Awards	Best Supporting Actor	Urko Olazabal	Won	
2022	36th Goya Awards	Best New Actress	María Cerezuela	Won	
2022	36th Goya Awards	Best Original Screenplay	Icíar Bolláin, Isa Campo	Nominated	
2022	36th Goya Awards	Best Original Score	Alberto Iglesias	Nominated	
2022	36th Goya Awards	Best Editing	Nacho Ruiz Capillas	Nominated	
2022	36th Goya Awards	Best Art Direction	Mikel Serrano	Nominated	
2022	36th Goya Awards	Best Production Supervision	Guadalupe Balaguer Trelles	Nominated	
2022	36th Goya Awards	Best Sound	Alazne Ameztoy, Juan Ferro, Candela Palencia	Nominated	
2022	36th Goya Awards	Best Costume Design	Clara Bilbao	Nominated	
2022	36th Goya Awards	Best Makeup and Hairstyles	Karmele Soler, Sergio Pérez Berbel	Nominated	
2022	30th Actors and Actresses Union Awards	Best Film Actress in a Leading Role	Blanca Portillo	Nominated	
2022	30th Actors and Actresses Union Awards	Best Film Actor in a Leading Role	Luis Tosar	Nominated	
2022	30th Actors and Actresses Union Awards	Best Film Actor in a Secondary Role	Urko Olazabal	Nominated	
2022	30th Actors and Actresses Union Awards	Best Film Actress in a Minor Role	Arantxa Aranguren	Won	
2022	Spanish Screenwriters' Union Awards	Best Screenplay in a Drama Feature Film	Isa Campo, Icíar Bollaín	Won	
2022	9th Platino Awards	Best Ibero-American Film		Nominated	
2022	9th Platino Awards	Best Director	Icíar Bollaín	Nominated	
2022	9th Platino Awards	Best Screenplay	Isa Campo, Icíar Bollaín	Nominated	
2022	9th Platino Awards	Best Actress	Blanca Portillo	Won	
2022	9th Platino Awards	Best Actor	Luis Tosar	Nominated	
2022	9th Platino Awards	Best Supporting Actor	Urko Olazabal	Nominated	
2022	9th Platino Awards	Best Editing	Nacho Ruiz Capillas	Nominated	
2022	9th Platino Awards	Cinema and Education in Values		Nominated	

== See also ==
- List of Spanish films of 2021
