= Animas (film) =

- Theatrical release poster
- Spanish: Ánimas
- Directed by: Laura Alvea; Jose F. Ortuño
- Written by: Laura Alvea; Jose F. Ortuño
- Produced by: Olmo Figueredo González-Quevedo
- Starring: Clare Durant; Iván Pellicer; Luis Bermejo; Liz Lobato; Chacha Huang; Ángela Molina
- Cinematography: Fran Fernández-Pardo
- Edited by: José M. G. Moyano; Fátima de los Santos; Nico Poedts; David Verdume
- Music by: Frederik Van de Moortel
- Production companies: La Claqueta PC; Acheron Films
- Distributed by: Filmax
- Release dates: 4 October 2018 (Sitges); 5 October 2018 (Spain)
- Running time: 83 minutes
- Country: Spain
- Language: Spanish

Ánimas is a 2018 Spanish psychological horror thriller film directed and written by Laura Alvea and Jose F. Ortuño.

== Cast ==
- Ángela Molina as Karla Berger
- Luis Bermejo as Daniel
- Clare Durant as Álex
- Iván Pellicer as Abraham
- Chacha Huang as Anchi
- Liz Lobato as Laura

== Production ==
The film is a La Claqueta and Acheron Films production. Shooting locations included Dos Hermanas.

== Release ==
The film was presented in the Noves Visions section of the Sitges Film Festival on 4 October 2018. Distributed by Filmax, it was theatrically released in Spain on 5 October 2018.

== Reception ==
On the review aggregator website Rotten Tomatoes, 57% of 7 critics' reviews are positive, with an average rating of 4.4/10. Noel Murray of Los Angeles Times declared the film to be "so powerfully atmospheric that it barely matters when the rest of the picture turns out to be a bit sparse". Santiago Alverú of Cinemanía rated the film 2 out of 5 stars, considering it "a gamble that might have benefited from a different type of direction of actors". Jordi Batlle Caminal of Fotogramas rated the film 3 out of 5 stars, citing its "unsettling" atmosphere as its best while negatively citing the unconvincing denouement.

== See also ==
- List of Spanish films of 2018
