= María Romanillos =

Spanish actress

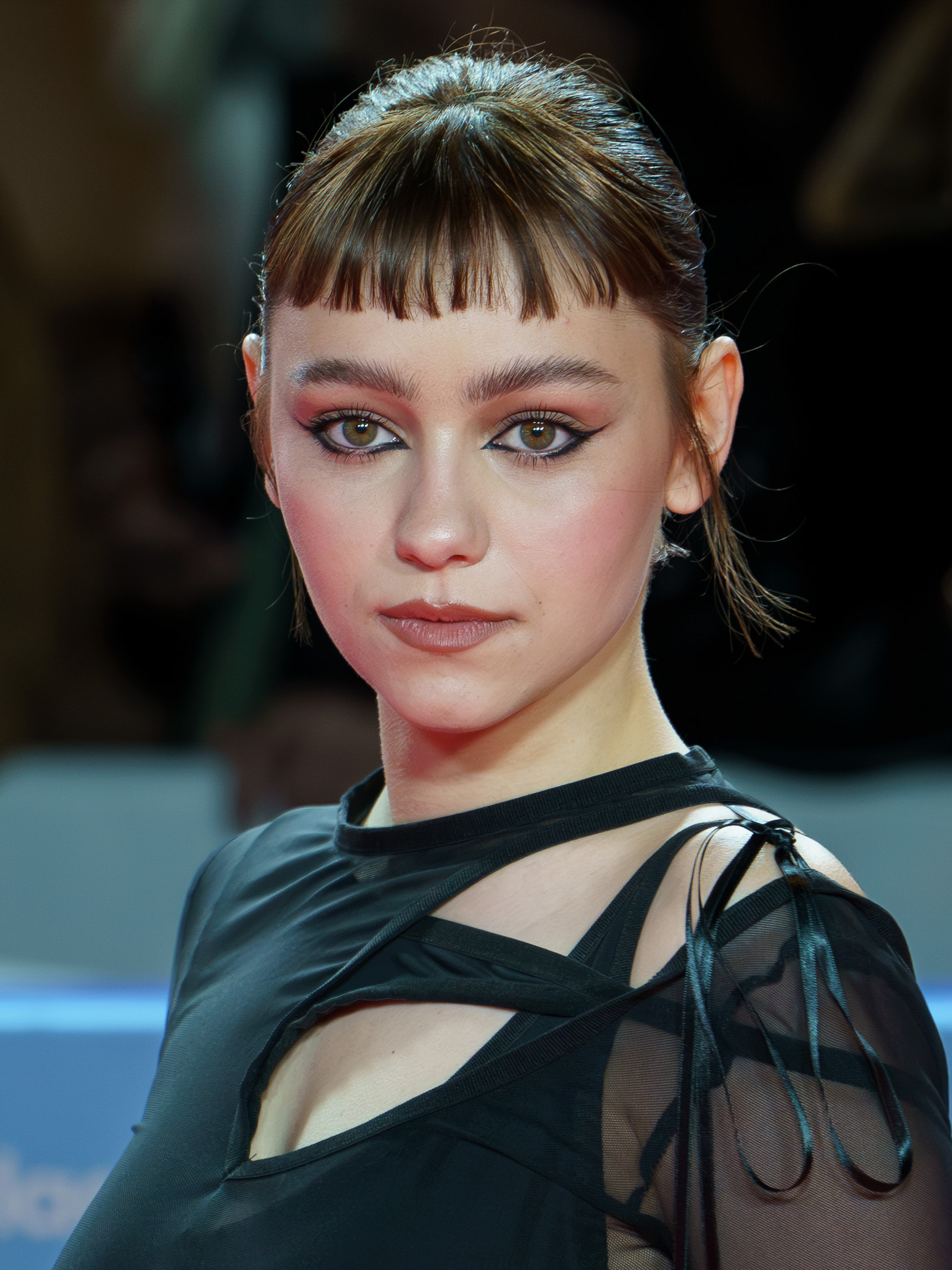
- Romanillos in 2025
- Born: 2004 (age 21–22); Madrid, Spain
- Occupation: Actress

María Romanillos (born 2004) is a Spanish film and television actress.

== Early life ==
Romanillos was born in 2004 in Madrid, training at theatre school Cuarta Pared and film school Primera Toma.

== Career ==
In 2020, she made her television debut, featuring in a minor role in Riot Police. She made her film debut in Claudia Pinto's The Consequences (2021), playing a girl arriving in an isolate island alongside her parents. For two seasons (2021–22), she starred in speculative fiction teen drama series Paradise. In 2022, she featured in thriller drama film Staring at Strangers, based on a novel by Juan José Millás; she portrayed a girl living with her parents in a home disturbed by the presence of a stranger who unintendedly arrived to their home hidden in an wardrobe. She also starred in supernatural horror film 13 Exorcisms (2022), portraying the protagonist, a young girl 'diagnosed' with suffering a demonic possession. In 2024 she played a teenager dreaming on being able to write as her uncle, a noted writer, in La casa. She also played the gender-fluid granddaughter of Luis Bermejo's Norberto, a woman trapped in a man's body, in Norberta.

In 2024, she wrapped shooting the thriller film El cuento del lobo (in the role of a cleaning woman) and joined the cast of Netflix sports teen drama series Olympo.

== Filmography ==
=== Film ===
Year	Title	Role	Notes	Ref.
2021	Las consecuencias (The Consequences)	Gabi	Feature film debut	
2022	No mires a los ojos (Staring at Strangers)	María		
2022	13 exorcismos (13 Exorcisms)	Laura Villegas		
2024	La casa	Ema		
2024	Norberta	Paula		
2024	El cuento del lobo	Lucía		
2025	V/H/S/Halloween	Vicky	Segement: "Ut Supra Sic Infra"	

=== Television ===
Year	Title	Role	Notes	Ref.
2020	Antidisturbios (Riot Police)	Lucía Osorio		
2021	Maricón perdido (Queer You Are)			
2021	Historias para no dormir (Stories to Stay Awake)		Episode: "El doble"	
2021–22	Paraíso (Paradise)	Bea	Seasons 1–2	
2025	Olympo	Nuria Bórges		

== Accolades ==
Year	Award	Category	Work	Result	Ref.
2021	24th Málaga Film Festival	Silver Biznaga for Best Supporting Actress	The Consequences	Won	
2021	36th Guadalajara International Film Festival	Best Actress	The Consequences	Won	
2021	4th Berlanga Awards	Best Supporting Actress	The Consequences	Nominated	
2025	7th Lola Gaos Awards	Best Supporting Actress	La casa	Won	
