= María Cerezuela =

Spanish actress (born 1993)

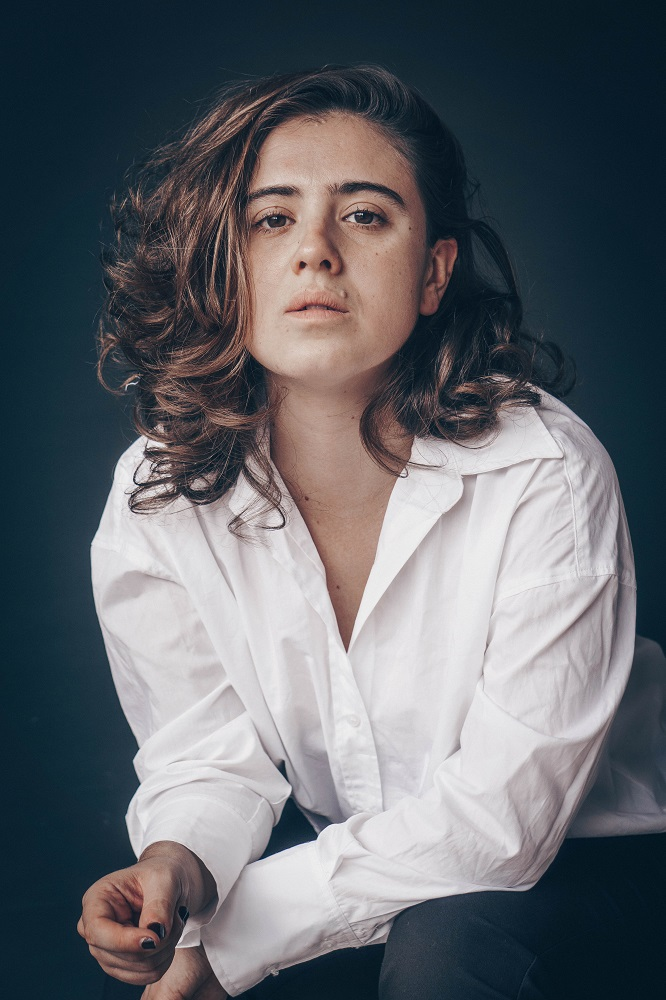
- Born: November 26, 1993 (age 32); Baracaldo, Basque Country, Spain
- Occupation: Actress

María Cerezuela (born 26 November 1993) is a Spanish actress best known for her portrayal of María Jáuregui in Icíar Bollaín's biographical drama Maixabel (2021), for which she won the Goya Award for Best New Actress at the 36th Goya Awards.

== Early life and education ==
Cerezuela was born in Baracaldo, in the province of Biscay, and grew up in Vitoria. She has said she decided she wanted to become an actress at the age of eight, after her father took her to see the first Harry Potter film and she was captivated by the character of Hermione Granger. She trained at the Taller de Artes Escénicas (TAE) in Vitoria and later completed a diploma in dramatic arts at the Centro de Formación Escénica BAI in Baracaldo, where she studied alongside actor Urko Olazabal.

== Career ==
=== Maixabel and Goya Award ===
Cerezuela made her feature film debut in Maixabel (2021), directed by Icíar Bollaín. The film tells the true story of Maixabel Lasa, the widow of Basque politician Juan María Jáuregui, who was assassinated by ETA in 2000 and who later agreed to meet some of her husband's killers as part of a restorative justice programme. The cast was headed by Blanca Portillo and Luis Tosar, with Cerezuela playing the couple's daughter and Olazabal as a former ETA member.

At the 36th Goya Awards, held on 12 February 2022 at the Palau de les Arts in Valencia, Cerezuela won the Goya for Best Actress Revelación, competing against Almudena Amor (El buen patrón), Ángela Cervantes (Chavalas), and Nicolle García (Libertad). In her acceptance speech she dedicated the award to Maixabel Lasa, who was present in the audience, and to director Bollaín for "changing her life". She was the second consecutive year that an actress from the Basque Country won the prize, following Jone Laspiur's win for Ane the previous year.

=== Later work ===
In 2022 she appeared in a supporting role in the Netflix series Intimidad, a Basque-set thriller created by Verónica Fernández and Laura Sarmiento. In 2025 she took on her first lead role in television, playing a deaf private detective in Romi, created by Iker Azkoitia and directed by Inés París, released on Amazon Prime Video on 26 September 2025. To prepare for the role she spent around a month training in sign language with coach Sara Castro, alongside her co-star Edurne Azkarate.

== Accolades ==
| Year | Award | Category | Work | Result | Ref |
|---|---|---|---|---|---|
| 2022 | 36th Goya Awards | Best New Actress | Maixabel | Won | |
