= Staring at Strangers =

2022 thriller drama film

- Theatrical release poster
- Spanish: No mires a los ojos
- Directed by: Félix Viscarret
- Written by: Félix Viscarret; David Muñoz
- Based on: Desde la sombra by Juan José Millás
- Produced by: Gerardo Herrero
- Starring: Paco León; Leonor Watling; Àlex Brendemühl; María Romanillos; Susana Abaitua; Juan Diego Botto; Marcos Ruiz
- Cinematography: Álvaro Gutiérrez
- Edited by: Victoria Lammers
- Music by: Mikel Salas
- Production companies: Tornasol; Desde la Sombra Árbol A.I.E.; Entre Chien et Loup
- Distributed by: Universal Pictures International Spain
- Release dates: 22 October 2022 (Seminci); 4 November 2022 (Spain)
- Countries: Spain; Belgium
- Language: Spanish

Staring at Strangers (Spanish: No mires a los ojos, known early in the production stage as From the Shadows; Desde la sombra) is a 2022 Spanish-Belgian thriller drama film directed by Félix Viscarret adapting the Juan José Millás' novel Desde la sombra. Its cast is led by Paco León, Leonor Watling, Àlex Brendemühl and María Romanillos.

== Plot ==
Damián has just been fired after 20 years working in the same company. His furious and somewhat violent reaction leads him to run to escape from his boss and hide from him in the first place he finds when leaving the office: a closet loaded into the van. The closet with Damián inside is delivered to the house of Lucía and Fede, a couple who lives with their daughter, María. That same night, an unexpected impulse leads Damián to stay with the family to become a mysterious presence that he will observe and move from the shadows. From then on, Damián becomes the family's guardian angel.

== Cast ==
- Paco León as Damián
- Leonor Watling as Lucía
- Àlex Brendemühl as Fede
- María Romanillos as María
- Susana Abaitua as Paula
- Juan Diego Botto as Sergio O'Kane
- Iñaki Gabilondo as himself
- Marcos Ruiz

== Production ==
An adaptation of Juan José Millás' novel Desde la sombra, the film was penned by Félix Viscarret (the director) alongside David Muñoz. It is a joint Spanish-Belgian international co-production, produced by Tornasol and Desde la Sombra Árbol A.I.E., alongside Entre Chien et Loup, with the participation of RTVE and Movistar+. Shooting began in January 2021 in Pamplona, and it had already wrapped in March 2021.

== Release ==
Staring at Strangers had its world premiere as the opening film of the 67th Valladolid International Film Festival (Seminci) on 22 October 2022. It is set for a 4 November 2022 theatrical release in Spain. Upon the film's release, lead actor Paco León described his character as "nearly Galician" to imply the character's introverted nature (in a deviation from the actor's traditional comedy roles), ensuingly eliciting controversy and public scrutiny.

== Reception ==
Beatriz Martínez of El Periódico de Catalunya rated the "strange and risky" Staring at Strangers film 4 out of 5 stars, otherwise pointing out how it is a picture "full of findings, twists, and turns" in which the spectators somehow all become voyeurs.

Andrea G. Bermejo of Cinemanía rated the film 4 out of 5 stars, bringing attention to Leonor Watling "in the best role of her career".

María Bescós of HobbyConsolas rated Staring at Strangers with 73 points ("good"), writing that it "is a feature film with a very unpleasant protagonist, who constantly puts you in uncomfortable situations, making you wonder about the reason for his crazy situations" which "manages to oppress and intrigue you until it ends".

== Accolades ==
Year	Award	Category	Nominee(s)	Result	Ref.
2023	2nd Carmen Awards	Best Actor	Paco León	Nominated	
2023	78th CEC Medals	Best Adapted Screenplay	David Muñoz, Félix Viscarret	Nominated	
2023	37th Goya Awards	Best Adapted Screenplay	David Muñoz, Félix Viscarret	Nominated	

== See also ==
- List of Spanish films of 2022
