= Ownerships =

- Theatrical release poster
- Spanish: Nuda propiedad
- Directed by: Alberto Utrera
- Written by: Alberto Utrera; Carlos Soria
- Produced by: Carlota Amor; Fede Pájaro
- Starring: Susana Abaitua; Maxi Iglesias; David Lorente; Paco Churruca; Pepe Viyuela
- Cinematography: Miguel Ángel García Rosado
- Edited by: Alberto Utrera
- Music by: Iván Valdés
- Production company: Garajonay Producciones
- Distributed by: Raabta Pictures
- Release date: 2026
- Running time: 99 minutes
- Country: Spain
- Language: Spanish

Ownerships (Spanish: Nuda propiedad) is a 2026 Spanish comedy-drama film directed by Alberto Utrera. It stars Susana Abaitua and Maxi Iglesias.

== Plot ==
Vera and Lucas purchase an apartment at a bargain price under a bare ownership modality, with the old man living there remaining as usufructuary until he dies. However, the man disappears and comes back changed as if he was not in his last rales, triggering the couple's frustration.

== Cast ==
- Susana Abaitua as Vera
- Maxi Iglesias as Lucas
- David Lorente
- Pepe Viyuela
- Paco Churruca
- Álex Peracaula
- Stéphanie Magnin
- Aten Soria

== Production ==
The film was produced by Garajonay Producciones along with Buendía Estudios. Shooting locations in Madrid included Calle Jesús del Valle 10. It was also shot in Santa Cruz de Tenerife.

== Release ==
Ownerships premiered at the 23rd Tarazona Comedy Film Festival on 21 August 2026. It also screened at the 31st Ourense Film Festival (OUFF) on 27 September 2026. Distributed by Raabta Pictures, it is scheduled to be released theatrically in Spain on 2 October 2026.

== Reception ==
Juan Pando of Fotogramas rated the film 3 out of 5 stars, commending "the subtle and elegant hint of political incorrectness".

Javier Ocaña of El País assessed that "somewhere between black comedy, mainstream comedy, and even with hints of American screwball comedy", the film "reaches remarkably delirious moments of dark, wry humor".

== See also ==
- List of Spanish films of 2026
