= The Good News (film) =

- Theatrical release poster
- Spanish: La buena nueva
- Directed by: Helena Taberna
- Screenplay by: Helena Taberna; Andrés Martorell
- Produced by: Helena Taberna; Iker Ganuza
- Starring: Unax Ugalde; Bárbara Goenaga; Guillermo Toledo
- Cinematography: Gonzalo Berridi
- Edited by: Nino Martínez Sosa
- Music by: Ángel Ilarramendi
- Production company: Lamia Producciones
- Distributed by: Golem Distribución
- Release dates: 31 October 2008 (Seminci); 14 November 2008 (Spain)
- Country: Spain
- Language: Spanish

The Good News (Spanish: La buena nueva) is a 2008 Spanish thriller drama film directed by Helena Taberna which stars Unax Ugalde alongside Bárbara Goenaga and Guillermo Toledo.

== Plot ==
The plot follows a young Catholic priest (Miguel) destined to a small village in Navarre reacting with horror to the atrocities committed by the Francoist faction (including Carlist and Falangist elements) during the Spanish Civil War.

== Cast ==
- Unax Ugalde as Miguel
- Bárbara Goenaga as Margari
- Guillermo Toledo as Antonino
- Gorka Aguinagalde as Hugo
- Mikel Tello as capitán de Falange
- Joseba Apaolaza as obispo
- Maribel Salas as Resu
- Iñake Irastorza as Benita
- Magdalena Aizpurua as Antxoni
- Susana Gómez as Arantxa

== Production ==
A Lamia Producciones production, the film had the participation of TVE and ETB. Shooting locations in Navarre included Leitza and Aldaz.

== Release ==
The film had its world premiere at the 53rd Valladolid International Film Festival (Seminci) on 31 October 2008. Distributed by Golem Distribución, the film was released theatrically in Spain on 14 November 2008.

== See also ==
- List of Spanish films of 2008
