= Goya's Ghosts =

2006 biographical drama film by Miloš Forman

- Theatrical release poster
- Directed by: Miloš Forman
- Written by: Miloš Forman; Jean-Claude Carrière
- Produced by: Saul Zaentz
- Starring: Javier Bardem; Natalie Portman; Stellan Skarsgård; Randy Quaid; Unax Ugalde
- Cinematography: Javier Aguirresarobe
- Edited by: Adam Boome
- Music by: Varhan Orchestrovič Bauer
- Production companies: The Saul Zaentz Company; Kanzaman; Antena 3 Televisión; Xuxa Producciones
- Distributed by: Warner Bros. Pictures (Spain); Samuel Goldwyn Films (United States)
- Release dates: 10 November 2006 (Spain); 20 July 2007 (United States)
- Running time: 114 minutes
- Countries: Spain; United States
- Languages: Spanish; English
- Budget: $50 million
- Box office: $9.4 million

Goya's Ghosts is a 2006 biographical drama film, directed by Miloš Forman (his final directorial feature before his death in 2018), and written by him and Jean-Claude Carrière. The film stars Javier Bardem, Natalie Portman, and Stellan Skarsgård as Francisco Goya, and was filmed on location in Spain during late 2005. The film was written, produced, and performed in English although it is a Spanish production.

Although the historical setting of the film is authentic, the story about Goya trying to defend a model is fictional, as are the characters Brother Lorenzo and the Bilbatúa family.

== Plot ==
In 1792, the work of Francisco Goya, the Official Court Painter to Spain's royalty, disturbs the Spanish Inquisition. Brother Lorenzo Casamares hires Goya to paint his portrait. Lorenzo eventually is given power to intensify the Inquisition.

While posing for Goya, Lorenzo sees a painting and asks about the model he uses, Inés, the daughter of rich merchant Tomás Bilbatúa. Inés is later summoned by the Inquisition and arrested on charges of "Judaizing" by refusing pork. She is stripped naked, tortured by strappado into a confession, and imprisoned. Tomás begs Goya for help, who in turn asks Lorenzo to learn about Inés's situation. Lorenzo finds her naked in the dungeon, feigning to help her and pass a message to her family. He covers Inés up and offers to pray with her. She prays with him at his request.

At a dinner in Bilbatúa's home, Lorenzo and Goya argue about the morality of torture. Bilbatúa draws up a document which says that Lorenzo, who had defended the practice of torture, confesses to being a monkey, and aided by his sons, tortures Lorenzo, causing him to break down and sign it. Bilbatúa promises to destroy the document if Inés is released. He gives Lorenzo a large gold 'donation' for the Church in the hopes that it may persuade the Holy Office to release her.

The Inquisitor-General Father Gregorio accepts the money, but refuses Inés's release, since she has confessed. Lorenzo again visits Inés and rapes her. Later, Tomás brings the document to king Charles IV, who promises to look into Inés's situation. The document is an embarrassment to the Holy Office, and Lorenzo flees to France when they come to arrest him. His portrait is confiscated and publicly burned in effigy.

Fifteen years later, the French army invades Spain, abolishes the Inquisition and sets its prisoners free. Lorenzo is now a fanatical adherent of the French Revolution. He has become Napoleon's chief prosecutor against his Inquisition ex-colleagues. (Note: This twist in Lorenzo's allegiance may have been inspired by Juan Antonio Llorente.) A French show trial court convicts and sentences Gregorio to death.

Inés, who slowly lost her sanity in captivity, returns home to find her family dead and turns to a now deaf Goya for help in finding the daughter she gave birth to years before. The child had been taken away at birth. Lorenzo, ashamed of being the father, sends Inés to an insane asylum. Lorenzo starts investigating and learns that the child, named Alicia, was placed at an orphanage from which she ran away years prior.

In Garden Park, Goya notices a prostitute named Alicia who looks like Inés. Goya asks Lorenzo for Inés, to reunite her with Alicia. Lorenzo secretly visits Alicia at the park and offers to pay her passage to America if she leaves Spain. She refuses. Meanwhile, Goya bribes the asylum's director to release Inés. He attempts to reunite her with Alicia at a tavern where prostitutes gather. As he tries to persuade Alicia, soldiers (on Lorenzo's orders) raid the place and arrest the prostitutes. Lorenzo plans to sell them as slaves to America.

The deluded Inés later finds a baby left by its mother, who was taken in the raid. She steals the baby away, thinking that it is her lost child.

Aided by the Spanish populace, the British are defeating the French. They come over a hill and charge the wagons transporting the prostitutes. The French escort abandons the wagons, and Alicia catches the eye of a British officer. Lorenzo is caught fleeing the invasion, and Spain reinstates the Inquisition. Lorenzo is sentenced to death.

On the scaffold, Lorenzo sees Alicia, next to the British officer, scoffing at him. He also sees Goya sketching the scene at a distance. Inés is also in the crowd and calls to Lorenzo, showing him the baby that she thinks is their daughter. Refusing to repent despite pleas from his former colleagues, Lorenzo is garroted. Lorenzo's body is taken away, escorted by Inés still carrying the child, with Goya calling for her. She glances back with a smile, but continues to accompany Lorenzo's body, with Goya following behind.

== Cast ==
- Natalie Portman as Inés Bilbatúa and Alicia
- Javier Bardem as Lorenzo Casamares
- Stellan Skarsgård as Francisco Goya
- Michael Lonsdale as the Inquisitor General Father Gregorio
- Randy Quaid as King Charles IV
- Blanca Portillo as Queen María Luisa
- José Luis Gómez as Tomás Bilbatúa
- Mabel Rivera as María Isabel Bilbatúa
- Unax Ugalde as Ángel Bilbatúa
- Fernando Tielve as Álvaro Bilbatúa
- Julian Wadham as Joseph Bonaparte
- Manuel Brun as King Ferdinand VII

== Production ==
Actual Goya paintings were used in the film, except for those which were supposed to resemble Bardem and Portman. Close-ups of Goya's hands creating his paintings used an actual artist.

Bardem said he first believed he should have been cast as Goya, but then realized Lorenzo was a "wonderful challenge because he embodies two entirely opposite behaviors."

Skarsgard wore a fat suit at first but enjoyed the food so much he gained enough weight for the role later.

When getting ready to cast Inés, Forman saw Portman on a magazine cover and noticed how much she looked like The Milkmaid of Bordeaux.

== Reception ==
=== Box office ===
The film grossed $2,198,929 in Spain and $1,199,024 in Italy. In the United States, Goya's Ghosts grossed $1,000,626, with a worldwide total of $9,448,082.

=== Critical reception ===
Goya's Ghosts received poor reviews from critics. On the review aggregator website Rotten Tomatoes, 30% of 86 critics' reviews are positive, with an average rating of 4.8/10. The website's consensus reads: "Ornate costumes and a talented cast can't make up for Ghosts' glacial pace and confused plot." Metacritic, which uses a weighted average, assigned the film a score of 52 out of 100, based on 25 critics, indicating "mixed or average" reviews.
