= 13 Exorcisms =

- Theatrical release poster
- Spanish: 13 exorcismos
- Directed by: Jacobo Martínez
- Screenplay by: Ramón Campos; Teresa Fernández-Valdés; Salvador S. Molina; Gema R. Neira; David Orea; Carlos Ruano
- Produced by: Ramón Campos; Mercedes Gamero; Teresa Fernández-Valdés
- Starring: María Romanillos; Ruth Díaz; Urko Olazabal; Pablo Revuelta; José Sacristán; Cristina Castaño; Silma López; Daniel Arias; Alícia Falcó; Uri Guitart
- Production companies: Mr. Fields and Friends; Atresmedia Cine; Bambú Producciones; 13 E Movie AIE
- Distributed by: Beta Fiction Spain
- Release date: 4 November 2022
- Country: Spain
- Language: Spanish

13 Exorcisms (Spanish: 13 exorcismos) is a 2022 Spanish supernatural horror film directed by Jacobo Martínez in his feature debut, which stars María Romanillos and José Sacristán in a demonically possessed girl versus exorcist priest relationship, along with Ruth Díaz and Urko Olazabal.

== Plot ==
Following a naive séance, and upon the strange behaviour displayed afterwards by teenager Laura Villegas, the latter's deeply Catholic family calls a Vatican-sanctioned exorcist to intervene in the purported case of demonic possession.

== Cast ==
- María Romanillos as Laura
- José Sacristán as Padre Olmedo ('Father Olmedo')
- Ruth Díaz as Carmen, Laura's mother
- Urko Olazabal as Tomás, Laura's father
- Pablo Revuelta as Jesús, Laura's brother
- Silma López as Lola
- Alícia Falcó as Mireia
- Daniel Arias as Enrique
- Uri Guitart as Arturo
- Cristina Castaño as Asunción

== Production ==
The screenplay was written by Ramón Campos, Teresa Fernández-Valdés, Salvador S. Molina, Gema R. Neira, David Orea, and Carlos Ruano. A Mr. Fields and Friends, Atresmedia Cine, Bambú Producciones and 13 E Movie AIE production, the film had the participation of Atresmedia, Movistar Plus+, AGADIC and Diputación de Ourense. It was shot in Galicia, including locations such as Ourense, Ordes, and Santiago de Compostela.

== Release ==
Distributed by Beta Fiction (thereby marking the company's debut as a distributor in the Spanish market), the film released theatrically in Spain on 4 November 2022. StudioCanal handled international sales.

== Reception ==
Raquel Hernández Luján of HobbyConsolas rated the film with 70 points ('good'), highlighting the cast's commitment, the most twisted scenes and the special effects as the best things about the film while citing the film's final coda as a negative element.

Beatriz Martínez of La Nueva España rated the film 3 out of 5 stars, pointing out that despite the helmer managing to pull a beginning eliciting just the right doses of suggestion and creeps, the perspective, initially anchored to the adolescent psyche of the character portrayed by an "extraordinary" Romanillos, becomes blurred, and "the climax is rushed and confusing, throwing away the achievements of its disturbing beginning".

Elsa Fernández-Santos of El País considered that the film "barely delves into its more realistic possibilities to offer [instead] a fiction that is slanted towards the fantastic, poorly constructed and that contributes very little to the genre", otherwise finding striking the direction of actors, as each one of them are seemingly in a different movie, with only Romanillos providing some truth to her character's portrayal.

Begoña del Teso of El Correo rated the film 2 out of 5 stars, arguing that it is "badly structured, badly lit, badly created" and pointing out that its makers "could not decide if they wanted to (badly) imitate 'The Exorcist' or 'Carrie'".

== Accolades ==
Year	Award	Category	Nominee(s)	Result	Ref.
2023	37th Goya Awards	Best Special Effects	Mariano García Marty, Jordi Costa	Nominated	

== See also ==
- List of Spanish films of 2022
