= Susana Abaitua =

Spanish actress (born 1990)

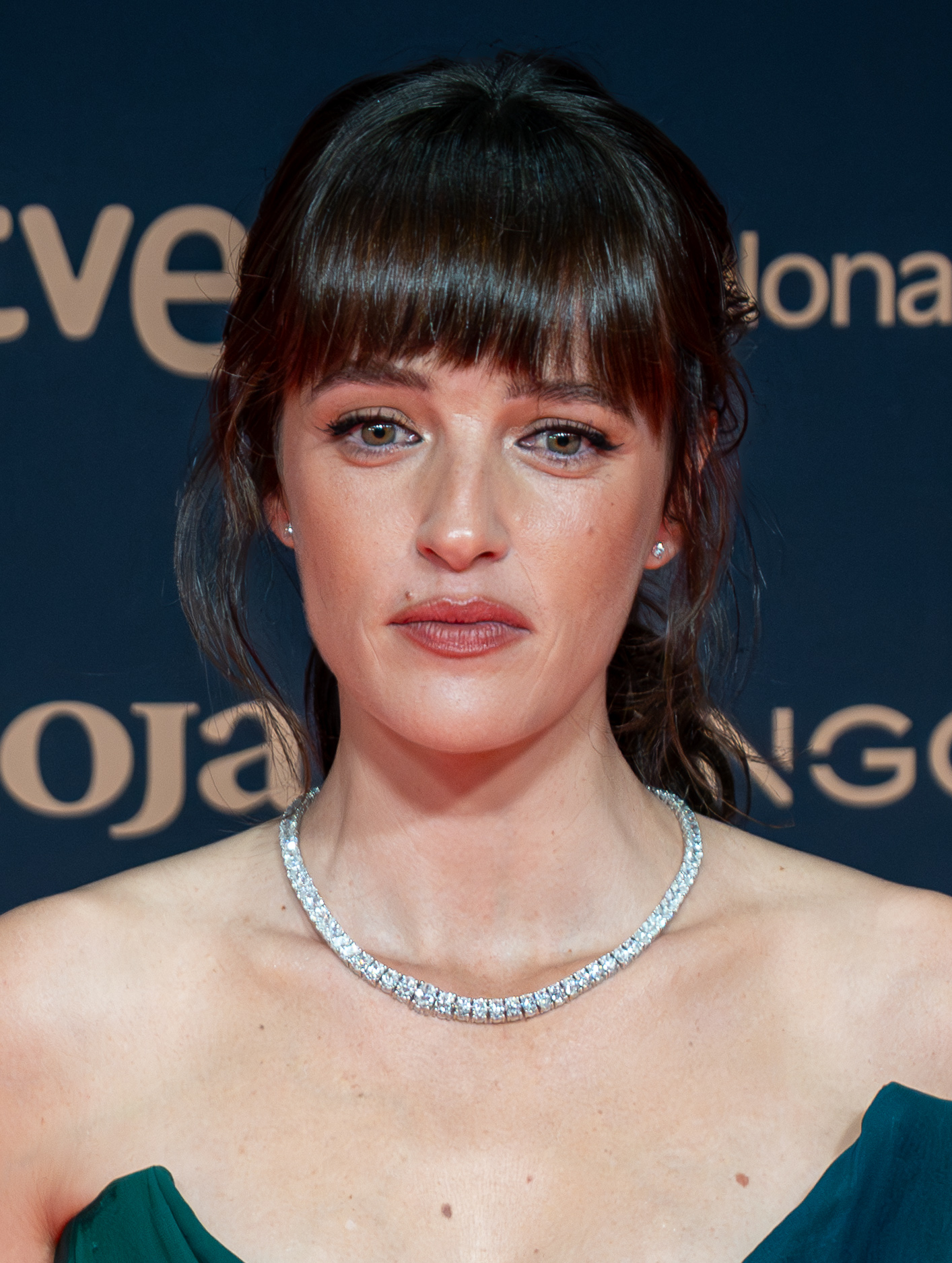
- Born: Susana Gómez Abaitua; 5 October 1990 (age 36); Vitoria-Gasteiz, Spain
- Occupation: Actress
- Years active: 2008–present

Susana Gómez Abaitua (born 5 October 1990) is a Spanish film, television and stage actress. She had breakthrough performances in the limited television series Patria and the film Crazy About Her.

== Biography ==
Susana Gómez Abaitua was born on 5 October 1990 in Vitoria-Gasteiz. One of her grandmothers was French. She trained as a classical dancer and then switched to acting. Abaitua had her debut in a feature film with a performance in Helena Taberna's The Good News (2008). She landed her first television role in the miniseries Una bala para el rey (2009). She has since starred in television series such as La pecera de Eva and Vida loca.

Her stage credits include performances in Yo sí me entero (2012), El primer secreto de Francisca y Raimundo (2014, an adaptation of El secreto de Puente Viejo), La flaqueza del bolchevique and La llamada (2015).

Her portrayal of missing young woman Ana Saura in whodunnit series Sé quién eres (2017) gained her notoriety as well as a Feroz Award nomination. Her portrayal of Nerea in ETA-themed drama series Patria (2020) earned her a second Feroz Award nomination.

== Filmography ==
=== Film ===
Year	Title	Role	Notes	Ref.
2008	La buena nueva (The Good News)		Feature film debut	
2010	Bon appétit			
2012	Stockholm			
2017	La llamada (Holy Camp!)			
2018	70 binladens (70 Big Ones)			
2019	4 latas	Ely		
2020	Estándar			
2020	Los inocentes			
2021	Loco por ella (Crazy About Her)	Carla		
2021	Fuimos canciones (Sounds Like Love)	Adriana		
2022	El comensal (The Dinner Guest)	Iciar		
2022	No mires a los ojos (Staring at Strangers)	Paula		
2023	Eres tú (Love at First Kiss)	Ariana		
2024	Valle de sombras (Valley of Shadows)	Clara		
2024	El bus de la vida (The Bus of Life)	Mai		
2024	Desmontando a Lucía (Guilty Attraction)	Lucía		
2025	La deuda (The Redemption)	Mara		
2025	Todo lo que no sé (Everything I Don't Know)	Laura		
2025	Un fantasma en la batalla (She Walks in Darkness)	Amaia		
2026	El último mono (Last Monkey Standing)	Mariela		
2026	Nuda propiedad (Ownerships)	Vera		
2026	Citas: la película (Dating in Barcelona)	Lúa		
2027	Blanco			

=== Television ===
Year	Title	Role	Notes	Ref.
2009	Una bala para el Rey		TV movie aired as 2-part miniseries	
2009	Pelotas			
2010–11	La pecera de Eva	Ana	Main	
2011	Vida loca	Laura	Main	
2014	Isabel	Mary of Aragon	Recurring	
2015	Cuéntame cómo pasó	Luchi	Season 16. Replaced by Elisabeth Larena	
2017	Sé quién eres	Ana Saura Castro	Main	
2020	Patria	Nerea	Main	
2023	El grito de las mariposas (The Cry of the Butterflies)	Arantxa Oyamburu	Main	
2023	Los Farad	Sara Farad		

== Accolades ==
Year	Award	Category	Work	Result	Ref.
2018	5th Feroz Awards	Best Supporting Actress in a Series	Sé quién eres	Nominated	
2021	8th Feroz Awards	Best Supporting Actress in a Series	Patria	Nominated	
2021	8th Platino Awards	Best Supporting Actress in a Miniseries or TV Series	Patria	Nominated	
2026	81st CEC Medals	Best Actress	She Walks in Darkness	Nominated	
2026	40th Goya Awards	Best Actress	She Walks in Darkness	Nominated	
2026	34th Actors and Actresses Union Awards	Best Film Actress in a Leading Role	She Walks in Darkness	Nominated	
