= Urko Olazabal =

Spanish actor

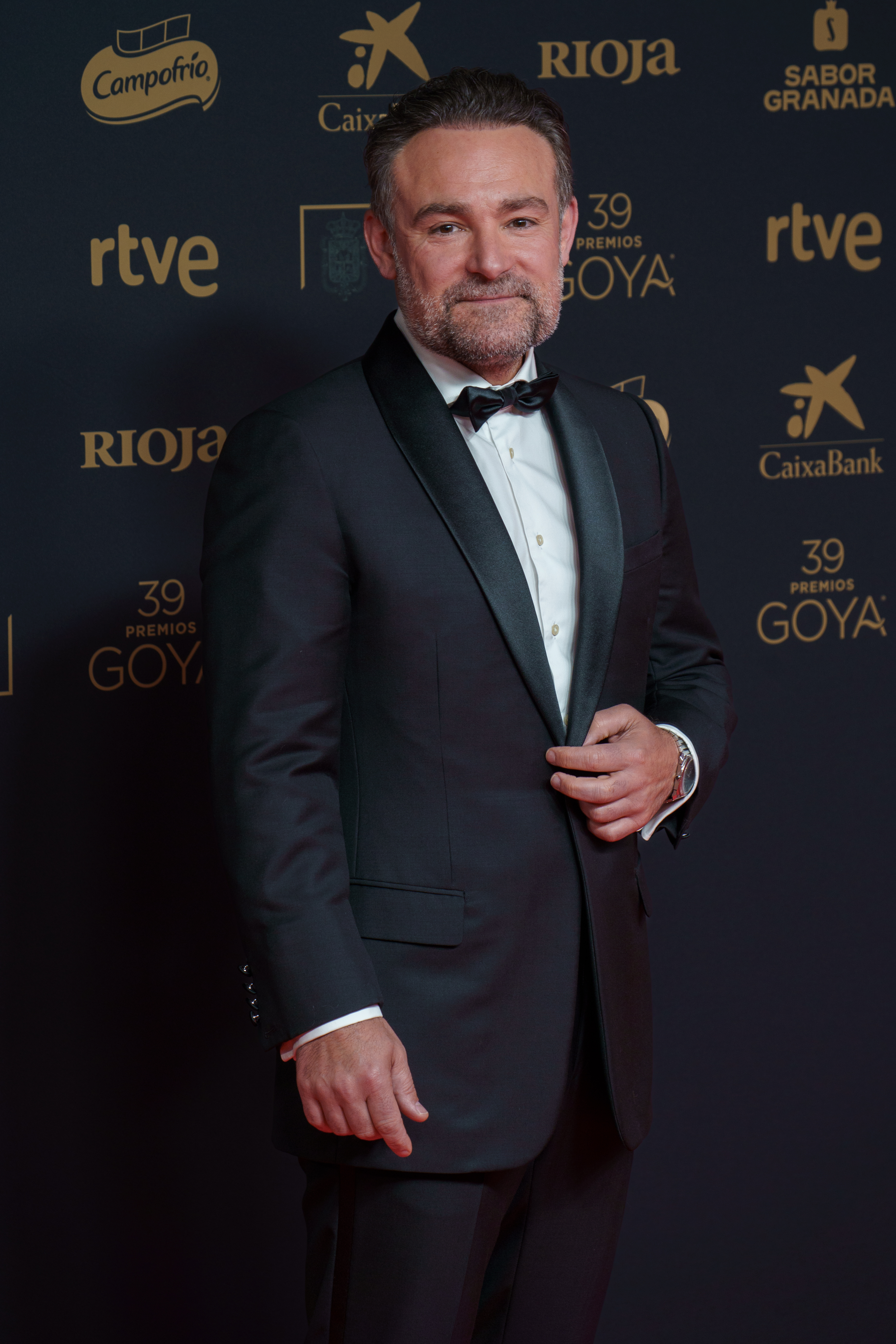
- Olazabal in 2025
- Born: Urko Olazabal Ortiz de Zarate; 1978 (age 47–48); Bilbao, Spain
- Education: University of the Basque Country (BFA, MA); BAI Performing Arts Training Center (BA)
- Occupation: Actor
- Years active: 2016–present
- Awards: Goya Award (2022); Feroz Award (2022); CEC Award (2022); Union of Basque Actors and Actresses Award (2022)

Urko Olazabal Ortiz de Zarate (born 1978) is a Spanish actor.

He is known for his role as Luis Carrasco in the film Maixabel by Icíar Bollain.

Among the awards he has received are the Goya Award (2022), the Feroz Award (2022), the CEC Award (2022) and the Union of Basque Actors and Actresses Award (2022).

== Life and career ==
He studied at Urretxindorra ikastola (Bilbao). He graduated in sculpture from the University of the Basque Country (UPV-EHU). He later trained in acting and drama at the BAI Performing Arts Training Center in Barakaldo where he graduated (2012–2016), and where he coincided with the actress María Cerezuela.

Later he developed his professional career as an actor in film and television series, mainly in the Basque Country. In addition to his career as an actor, he has written and directed two short films: Anujin (awarded for his script at the Medina del Campo Film Week) and Mithyabadi.

In 2022 he won the Goya Award, the Feroz Award and the Círculo de Escritores Cinematográficos Award for his portrayal of Luis Carrasco in the film Maixabel by Icíar Bollain.

== Private life ==
He underwent lymphoma and cancer.

== Filmography ==
=== Films ===
- 2027, Blanco, dir. Félix Viscarret
- 2026, Bajo tus pies, dir. Cristian Bernard
- 2024, Soy Nevenka, dir. Icíar Bollaín
- 2023, Teresa, dir. Paula Ortiz
- 2022, 13 exorcismos, dir. Jacobo Martínez
- 2021, Maixabel, dir. Icíar Bollain
- 2020, Ane Is Missing, dir. David Pérez Sañudo
- 2017, Errementari, dir. Paul Urkijo
- 2016, Ira – Wrath, dir. Jota Aronak

=== Television ===
- 2024, Detective Touré
- 2023, Reina Roja
- 2021, La que se avecina
- 2020, Patria
- 2020, Caminantes
- 2018, La víctima número 8

== Awards ==
- 2022, Goya Award (winner)
- 2022, Feroz Award (winner)
- 2022, CEC Award (winner)
