= Nico Romero =

Spanish actor

- Born: Antonio Nicolás Romero Díaz; 9 March 1987 (age 39); Cáceres, Province of Cáceres, Extremadura, Spain
- Education: Instituto del Cine Madrid
- Occupation: Actor
- Years active: 2010–present

Antonio Nicolás "Nico" Romero Díaz (born 9 March 1983) is a Spanish actor. He is probably best known for his performance as Pablo Santos/Julio Santos in the Netflix series Cable Girls, Nick in Eyes of the Roshi (2017), Olmo in Cuento de verano (2015), and Simón Lozano in Ciega a citas (2014).

== Biography ==
A student initially pursuing a career in nursing in Italy, Nico Romero decided to train as an actor, doing it mainly at the Madrid Film Institute where he received a Diploma in Film and Television Interpretation and with Fernando Pizaje. He carried out various courses and workshops with Andrés Lima, María Morales, Chechu Coloráu, Manuel Morón, etc.

== Filmography ==
Title	Year	Role
Bandolera	2012	Jesús Ridruejo
Ciega a citas	2014	Simón Lozano
Amar es para siempre	2016	Andrés Valdivia
Cable Girls	2017 - 2020	Pablo and Julio Santos
The Idhun Chronicles	2020 - 2021	Shail (voice)
Rotten Legacy	2025	Manuel
