= Fugitiva =

2018 Spanish-language television series

- Genre: Thriller; Drama
- Created by: Joaquín Oristrell
- Directed by: Belén Macías; Antonio Cuadri; Sergio Cabrera
- Starring: Paz Vega; Julio Bracho; Arantza Ruiz
- Music by: Juan Pablo Compaired
- Country of origin: Spain
- Original language: Spanish
- No. of seasons: 1
- No. of episodes: 9

Production
- Running time: 70 min.
- Production companies: RTVE; Grupo Ganga

Original release
- Network: La 1
- Release: 5 April – 7 June 2018

Fugitiva (lit. 'Fugitive') is a nine-part Spanish thriller-drama television series produced by RTVE and Grupo Ganga, created by Joaquín Oristrell and starring Paz Vega, Julio Bracho and Arantza Ruiz. It originally aired on La 1 in 2018.

== Premise ==
The plot, set in between Mexico and Spain, revolves around Magda (Paz Vega) who organizes an escape plan hidden as a kidnap to protect her children from the enemies of her husband Alejandro (Julio Bracho).

== Cast ==
- Paz Vega as Magda
- Julio Bracho as Alejandro
- Arantza Ruiz as Paulina
- Luisa Rubino as Claudia
- Lander Otaola as Edu
- Iván Pellicer as Ruben
- José Manuel Poga as Tobias
- Mercedes Sampietro as Nora
- Melina Matthews as Isabel
- Sebastian Montecino as Ricardo
- Matt Fowler as Velasco
- Philip Hersh as Amadeo de Juan
- Billy Kametz as Tobias
- Tara Sands as Magda

== Production and release ==
Produced by RTVE in collaboration with Grupo Ganga, it was filmed in Madrid and Benidorm. The series premiered on April 5, 2018 on La 1. The main theme of the series was interpreted by the singer Ana Guerra. The broadcasting run ended on 7 June 2018, averaging 1,391,000 viewers and a 8.5% share.

Series	Episodes	Originally released			Viewers	Share (%)	Ref.
Series	Episodes	First released	Last released	Network	Viewers	Share (%)	Ref.
1	9	5 April 2018	7 June 2018	tve	1,391,000	8.5	

This is a caption
No. in season	Title	Viewers	Original release date	Share (%)
1	"La salida"	1,748,000	5 April 2018	10.3
2	"La llegada"	1,460,000	12 April 2018	9.0
3	"La búsqueda"	1,407,000	19 April 2018	8.9
4	"El topo"	1,363,000	26 April 2018	8.5
5	"La obsesión"	1,360,000	3 May 2018	8.3
6	"El plan"	1,299,000	10 May 2018	8.0
7	"La noche"	1,286,000	17 May 2018	7.7
8	"El mar"	1,225,000	24 May 2018	7.6
9	"La fuerza"	1,372,000	7 June 2018	8.5
