= This Solitude =

- Film poster
- Spanish: Esta soledad
- Directed by: Javier Giner
- Written by: Javier Giner; Luisa Matienzo
- Produced by: Bing Fang; Miguel Torrente
- Starring: Oriol Pla; Marina Salas; Gemma Martínez; Kai Etxaniz; Itziar Lazkano; Ione Irazabal; Juan Viadas; Miren Gaztañaga; Mikel Bustamante; Ainhoa Artetxe; Omar Ayuso
- Cinematography: Lali Rubio Panadès
- Edited by: Roberto Bra
- Music by: Claudia Lively
- Production companies: Fuga de Cuerpos AIE; Balance Media Entertainment; Basajaun Filmax; La Embajada TV
- Distributed by: Filmax
- Release dates: 23 September 2026 (Zinemaldia); 30 October 2026 (Spain)
- Country: Spain
- Language: Spanish

This Solitude (Spanish: Esta soledad) is a 2026 Spanish drama film directed by Javier Giner (in his debut feature) starring Oriol Pla and Marina Salas.

It premiered at the 74th San Sebastián International Film Festival in September 2026 ahead of its 30 October 2026 theatrical release in Spain by Filmax.

== Plot ==
Set in a gloomy Bilbao, the plot follows Leo and Lorea, who still love each other despite having broken their 5-year-long relationship.

== Cast ==
- Oriol Pla as Leo
- Marina Salas as Lorea
- Gemma Martínez as Irati
- Kai Etxaniz as Gabriel
- Itziar Lazkano as madre Lorea
- Ione Irazabal as Nekane
- Juan Viadas as padre de Leo
- Miren Gaztañaga as Itsaso
- Mikel Bustamante as Harkaitz
- Ainhoa Artetxe as Maialen
- Omar Ayuso

== Production ==
A Fuga de cuerpos AIE, Balance Media Entertainment, La Embajada TV, and Basajaun Filmak production, This Solitude is Giner's directorial debut feature. He wrote the screenplay along with Luisa Matienzo, who also took over executive production.

Lali Rubio worked as cinematographer using an Arri Alexa Mini camera and Zeiss Superspeed S16 lenses. Shooting locations in Biscay included Bilbao, Sestao, Getxo, and Zaratamo.

== Release ==
The film screened in the 'New Directors' section of the 74th San Sebastián International Film Festival on 23 September 2026. It also made it to the lineup of the 28th Abycine festival. Distributed by Filmax, it is scheduled to be released theatrically in Spain on 30 October 2026.

== Reception ==
Manuel J. Lombardo of Diario de Sevilla gave the film a 2-star rating, writing that "slightly impostured form of hyperrealism seeks to shock rather than reveal the inner truth of its characters" with only Etxaniz's character managing to provide authenticity.

Philipp Engel of Cinemanía rated This Solitude 4 out of 5 stars, lauding it as an "extraordinary" film, otherwise pointing out that in addition to the "impressive" performances, the film stands out for its mise-en-scène, opting for a gritty realism.

Laura Pérez of Fotogramas rated the film 3 out of 5 stars, commending "the courage with which it plunges into the harsh and the ugly".

== See also ==
- List of Spanish films of 2026
