= Instituto del Cine Madrid =

Film school in the Madrid region, Spain

- Established: 2002; 23 years ago
- Location: Madrid, Community of Madrid, Spain
- Website: www.institutodelcine.es

Madrid Film Institute (Spanish: Instituto del Cine Madrid) is a film school located in the city of Madrid. It was created in 2002. It has teaching staff with experience in teaching Film and TV and, in addition, they are active professionals in the industry.

In 2017, the institute launched the Instituto del Cine Canarias, in Las Palmas de Gran Canaria. In the 2018 Goya Awards, there were 23 former students or teachers who participated in the films that were nominated for awards. Many of the screenwriters, directors, editors, make-up artists, cinematographers or actors who currently work in the main series or films produced in Spain have been trained in its classrooms.

== Alumni ==
- Carolina Bang
- Nico Romero
