= Paradise (2021 TV series) =

Spanish television series

- Official poster
- Spanish: Paraíso
- Genre: Science fiction; Fantasy; Adventure
- Created by: Fernando Gonzalez Molina; Ruth García; David Oliva
- Directed by: Fernando González Molina
- Starring: Macarena García; Iñaki Ardanaz; Pau Gimeno; Cristian López; León Martínez; Héctor Gozalbo; Yoon C. Joyce; María Romanillos; Patricia Iserte
- Ending theme: "Paraíso" by Ana Torroja
- Composer: Lucas Vidal
- Country of origin: Spain
- Original language: Spanish
- No. of seasons: 2
- No. of episodes: 15

Production
- Production companies: Movistar+; Globomedia (The Mediapro Studio)

Original release
- Network: Movistar+
- Release: June 4, 2021 – June 16, 2022

Paradise (Spanish: Paraíso) is a Spanish speculative fiction television series with mystery and adventure elements set in 1992. Produced by Movistar+ and Globomedia (The Mediapro Studio), it is directed by Fernando González Molina. It premiered on 4 June 2021.

== Premise ==
The fiction is set in the Spanish Levante in the 1990s. The plot concerns the disappearance of 3 girls—Sandra, Elena and Malena—in 1992 in the fictional Valencian coastal town of "Almanzora de la Vega". (Note: Mirroring the crime of the Alcàsser girls, also occurred in 1992.) As the police investigation is seemingly going nowhere, Sandra's younger brother, Javi, starts another search together with Quino, Álvaro and Zeta.

== Cast ==
- Macarena García as Paula Costa, a Civil Guard agent investigating the case of three missing girls in the Mediterranean coast.
- Iñaki Ardanaz as Mario, the father of one of the missing girls.
- Gorka Otxoa as Morte, Zeta's father.
- Pau Gimeno as Javi.
- Cristian López as Álvaro.
- León Martínez as Quino.
- Héctor Gozalvo as Zeta.
- María Romanillos as Bea.
- Patricia Iserte as Olivia.

Introduced in season 2

- Álvaro Mel as Mateo.
- Begoña Vargas as Evelyn.
- Laura Laprida as Valentina.
- Carla Domínguez as Anabel.

== Production ==
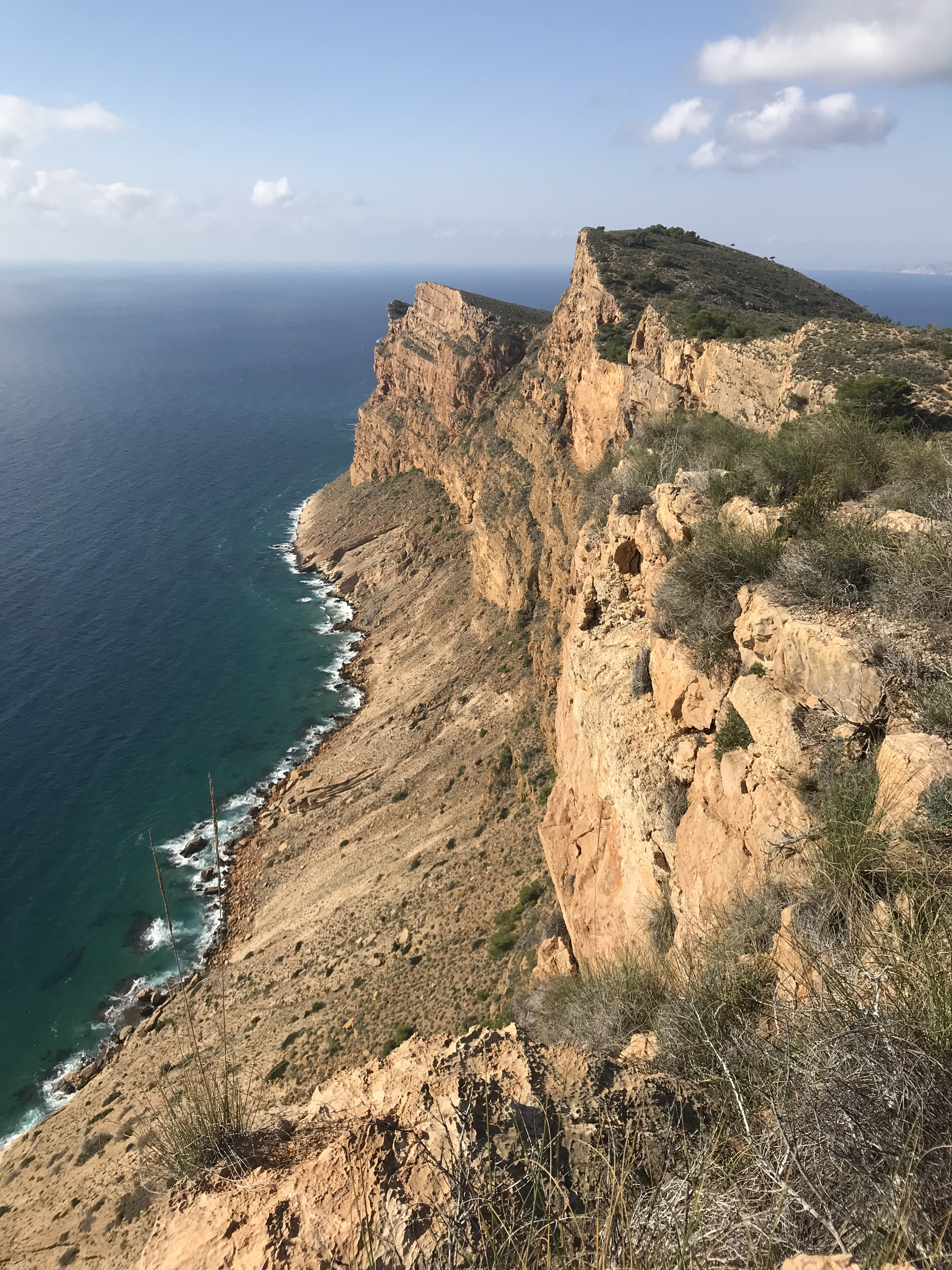
The Natural Park of Serra Gelada was chosen as one of the shooting locations.

Paraíso was produced by Movistar+ in collaboration with Globomedia (The Mediapro Studio). Created by Fernando Gonzalez Molina, Ruth García and David Oliva, cited inspirations included the works of Steven Spielberg and series such as V, Verano azul and Compañeros, although it was already likened to Stranger Things soon after the announcement of the project. Fernando González Molina directed the series whereas Antón Laguna was charged with the art direction. Lucas Vidal composed the musical score. It also features songs by OBK and Mecano. The series' main theme was performed by Ana Torroja.

Filming started by January 2020, taking place in several places in Spain. Shooting locations in the province of Alicante included Benidorm, Altea, Xàbia, Santa Pola, Calp, L'Alfàs del Pi and the Natural Park of Serra Gelada. Additional footage was shot in other locations such as Alhama de Aragón (Zaragoza), municipalities in the Valencia province and the Madrid region, and the Centro Nacional del Vidrio in La Granja (Segovia). Filming wrapped in August 2020. On 20 April 2021, Movistar+ announced the intended premiere date of 4 June 2021.

In June 2021, The Mediapro Studio reported that the production crew had begun filming of season 2 on 17 May 2021 in Begur (Girona), with Fernando González Molina returning as director. Season 2 was presented by a group of cast and crew members at the 54th Sitges Film Festival on 12 October 2021. In October 2021, WarnerMedia announced the addition of the series (titled Paradise) to their catalogue as "Max Original" with a release date on HBO Max set for 28 October 2021.

Movistar Plus+ scheduled the release of the second and final season of the series for 16 June 2022.

Series	Episodes	Originally released			Ref.
Series	Episodes	First released	Last released	Network	Ref.
1	7	4 June 2021	2 July 2021	Movistar+ / Movistar Plus+	
2	TBA	16 June 2022	TBA	Movistar+ / Movistar Plus+	

No. overall	No. in season	Title	Directed by	Original release date
1	1	"El incendio"	Fernando González Molina	4 June 2021
2	2	"La cabina"	Fernando González Molina	4 June 2021
3	3	"La Mortaja"	Fernando González Molina	4 June 2021
4	4	"La feria"	Fernando González Molina	11 June 2021
5	5	"Presa"	Fernando González Molina	18 June 2021
6	6	"Tres chicas cada tres años"	Fernando González Molina	25 June 2021
7	7	"El balneario"	Fernando González Molina	2 July 2021
