= Crazy About Her (film) =

2021 film

- Official release poster
- Spanish: Loco por ella
- Directed by: Dani de la Orden
- Written by: Natalia Durán; Eric Navarro
- Produced by: Toni Carrizosa; Alberto Aranda; Kike Maíllo; Bernat Saumell
- Starring: Álvaro Cervantes; Susana Abaitua
- Cinematography: Daniel Aranyó
- Edited by: Oriol Pérez; Elena Ruiz
- Music by: Julio de la Rosa
- Production companies: Playtime Movies; Sábado Películas; Loco Por Ti la Película
- Distributed by: Netflix
- Release date: 26 February 2021
- Running time: 102 minutes
- Country: Spain
- Language: Spanish

Crazy About Her (Spanish: Loco por ella) is a 2021 Spanish romantic comedy film directed by Dani de la Orden, written by Natalia Durán and Eric Navarro and starring Álvaro Cervantes and Susana Abaitua. It was released on 26 February 2021 by Netflix.

== Plot ==
Adri is a successful journalist for an entertainment magazine. On a night out with his friends, he meets Carla, who is spontaneous and impulsive. She seduces him to a one-night stand and insists they can never see each other again. They go to a hotel where they crash a wedding reception and have sex in the bridal suite, before Carla abruptly leaves.

Adri, now smitten with Carla, insists on finding her. He is led to a mental hospital where he sees Carla is a patient. Thinking she was happy to see him too, Adri hatches a plan to obtain her number by being admitted since unrequested visitors are not allowed. When inside, he finds Carla again, but she is shocked and angry at his presence. Upset, Adri tries to leave, but the staff stop him as they think he is actually mentally ill. He claims he is a journalist and his admittance was only for an article, but they do not believe him. Adri's friend attempts to get him out, to no avail. Before she leaves, he writes her a demeaning article about the mental hospital to submit to his boss.

Knowing he wants to escape, Adri's kind-hearted schizophrenic roommate, Saúl, explains that, along with behavioral improvements, the only way to leave is to be friendly with other patients, as peer evaluations play a role in one's release. Adri meets the others, including Martha who has depression due to her Tourette's, Victor who has OCD and Tina who is delusional. Martha has a huge crush on Victor, but is too insecure to tell him due to her tics. Adri offers to help Martha muster up the courage to confess her feelings. In return, he expects good evaluations from them.

Saúl asks Adri to pretend they are both doctors when his young daughter visits, as her stepfather disapproves of his disorder. While posing as a doctor, Adri bails an uncomfortable Carla out of a visit from her parents. However, she still treats him coldly. Adri finally convinces Martha to seduce Victor with a pickup line, which fails until Carla steps in and tells her to admit her feelings bluntly, which goes well. Carla reveals to Adri that she is bipolar. She has episodes of extreme euphoria where she does things for fun without thinking of the consequences, like the night they met. She also has episodes of severe depression and frequent mood swings.

Saúl is deeply upset to discover his ex-wife's husband does not want his daughter to visit anymore. When Saúl is missing, Adri realizes that he has jumped off the third floor and enlists the help of Carla to find him. The two discover Saúl hysterical and on the way to take his daughter. Adri tries to talk him out, but Carla manages to calm him down. During a conversation with Carla, Adri promises she will get better and live normally on her own.

He begins bonding with everyone including Carla, and the two start dating. Saúl's ex starts bringing his daughter's to visit again, without her husband, and he finally shares his illness with her. As Adri and Carla grow closer, she stops taking her medicine as she believes she is getting better, but her mood swings have become more intense. One night, Adri finds Carla behaving erratically on the ledge of the roof. He manages to safely pull her down, but confesses to the staff that she has been off her medication. Upset with his betrayal, Carla refuses to see him again.

Adri's article is published and has circled around the hospital. As a result, everyone starts to despise him for his negative depictions of mental health, which he regrets. The hospital director, now realizing that Adri was telling the truth, allows him to leave. She also tells him that the institution helps people learn how to live with their disorders, not pretend they do not have it to please others.

After returning to work, Adri writes another article about his time at the hospital, destigmatizing mental disorders and declaring his love for Carla, much to her disdain. Carla convinces Martha, Victor, Tina and Saúl to help her break out and find Adri to confront him. At his workplace, Adri professes his love for Carla, despite the severity of her mental illness. The two share a kiss and embark on another spontaneous night together. Afterwards, Adri drops Carla back at the hospital where she finally gives him her number and he promises to call as soon as she is released. A teary-eyed Carla re-enters the institution.

== Cast ==
- Álvaro Cervantes as Adri
- Susana Abaitua as Carla
- Luis Zahera as Saúl
- Aixa Villagrán as Marta
- Txell Aixendri as Tina
- Nil Cardoner as Víctor
- Eduardo Antuña as Sergio
- Paula Malia as Laura
- Clara Segura as psychiatric center director
- Maria Ribera as Nurse Rosa
- Francesc Ferrer as nurse receptionist
- Aaron Porras as Marc
- Mireia Portas as Saúl's ex
- Eduard Gibert as stepfather
- Iris Vallés Torres as Sara
- Rocío León as Ana
- Kike García as Luis

== See also ==
- List of Spanish films of 2021
