= Bon Appétit (film) =

2010 film

- Theatrical release poster
- Directed by: David Pinillos
- Screenplay by: David Pinillos; Juan Carlos Rubio; Paco Cabezas
- Produced by: Pedro Uriol
- Starring: Unax Ugalde; Nora Tschirner; Giulio Berruti; Herbert Knaup; Elena Irureta; Xenia Tostado; Alfonso Da Costa
- Cinematography: Mario Suances
- Edited by: Fernando Franco
- Music by: Marcel Vaid
- Production companies: Morena Films; Zodiac Pictures; Egoli Tossell
- Distributed by: Warner Bros. Pictures
- Release dates: 12 November 2010 (Spain); 25 November 2010 (Germany & Switzerland)
- Running time: 90 minutes
- Countries: Switzerland; Spain; Germany; Italy
- Language: English
- Budget: $3,000,000
- Box office: $8,050,000

Bon Appétit is a 2010 romantic drama film directed by David Pinillos and written by Juan Carlos Rubio, David Pinillos, and Paco Cabezas. The story is based on a young Spanish chef working at a prestigious restaurant in Zürich, Switzerland. He falls in love with a work-partner but she is in love with their boss. The film features Unax Ugalde and Nora Tschirner.

== Plot ==
Daniel (Unax Ugalde) is a young and ambitious Spanish chef who just realized his dream: working at a famous restaurant managed by star chef Thomas Wackerle (Herbert Knaup). Due to his extraordinary talent, Daniel soon progresses in Wackerle's demanding kitchen. He is attracted to Hanna (Nora Tschirner), the attractive sommelier of the restaurant.

One evening, Daniel and Hanna are walking in the city, talking about life, love, and relationships. Daniel expresses his opinion that love is not at all like a romantic movie. After saying this, Hanna kisses Daniel. This unexpected situation provides a turning point in Daniel's tidy and organized life. He faces a difficult question: Is it worth risking his professional career for love?

Bon Appétit is a film telling the story of friends who dare to cross the thin line dividing friendship and romantic love. The film talks about conventional people and includes scenes shot in some of the most picturesque places of Zürich.

== Cast ==
- Unax Ugalde as Daniel
- Nora Tschirner as Hanna
- Giulio Berruti as Hugo
- Herbert Knaup as Thomas Wackerle
- Elena Irureta as Daniel's Mother
- Xenia Tostado as Eva
- Ibán Malo as Lukas
- Alfonso Da Costa as Gaëtan
- Susana Abaitua as Sara
- Daniel Alonso as Samuel
- Irie Leon Dje Bi as Paul
- Eva Nilsen as Sibel

== Production ==
Bon Appétit is the first film directed by David Pinillos. Producer Pedro Uriol said that he and Pinillos are friends who have known each other for many years. Pinillos had worked as a film editor, but not as a director, but according to Uriol, he had the most important qualities in a director: sensitivity and technique. The screenplay was written by David Pinillos, Juan Carlos Rubio and Paco Cabezas.

Pinillos had worked with important directors like editing worker like Álex de la Iglesia or Daniel Sánchez Arévalo. Pinillos wanted to tell a story about that "thin red line" that divides love and friendship and that everyone has occasionally, and how that crossing changes and complicates life. Both Pinillos and Uriol wanted a protagonist who goes to another country because that suggests a new beginning. According to Pinillos and Uriol, it is curious how a person can find it easier to open one's heart to strangers than to family or friends. Pinillos said that Bon Appétit is inspired by the American film Before Sunrise by Richard Linklater and the French film L'Auberge espagnole by Cédric Klapisch. (Note: Production notes)

Morena Films, the studio, is got used to work in European spheres and the producer likes to work with international co-producers. Bon Appétit found other studios for European market: Morena Films from Spain, Zodiac Pictures from Switzerland and Egoli Tossell from Germany. (Note: Director's commentary)

Thanks for studios and other producer companies like Beta Films (distributor of The Lives of Others), Pixstar, Italian producer and television and European financing programmes by EURIMAGES and MEDIA was possible to realise Bon Appétit in Spanish, Swiss and German cinemas with a 2.8 million euros in budget. In Spain, channel television implied were ETB and TVE. (Note: Making-off)

Like there are actors from many European countries, the film was shot in English although there are parts in Spanish, French, and German languages.

== Critical response and distribution ==
Bon Appétit has positive reviews in Spain, Switzerland, and also Germany. The film had its premiere at the Malaga Film Festival in April 2010 with a positive reaction from the Spanish critics. At the festival Unax Ugalde won the award for Best Actor in a Leading Role. In October, the film was in the Valladolid Film Festival. In cinema magazines, Bon Appétit has 7,3/10 with a good results. In addition, Bon Appétit won Goya Award for Best New Director for Pinillos.

The film screened at the Rio de Janeiro International Film Festival meeting positive reviews and critical acclaim, as well as at Toulouse Cinespaña, and the Stony Brook Film Festival.

Bon Appétit was released in Spain on 12 November 2010. It was released in Germany and Switzerland on 25 November 2010.
