= Baztan =

Baztan (or Baztán) may refer to:

- Baztan (comarca) in Navarre, Spain
- Baztan (river) in Navarre, Spain
- Baztan, Navarre in Navarre, Spain
- Nuevo Baztán, a settlement in the Community of Madrid, Spain
