= Gorka Aguinagalde =

Spanish actor (born 1966)

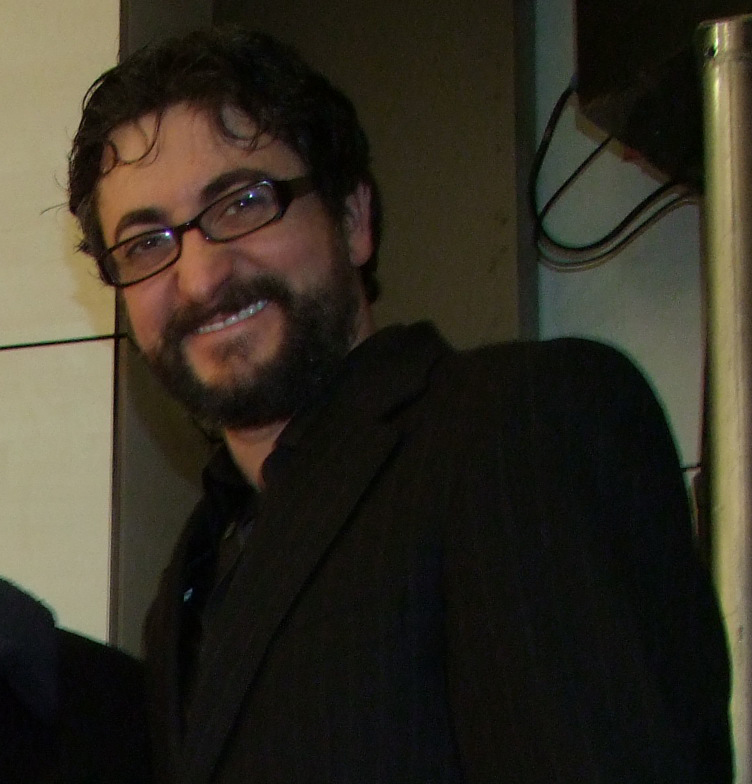
- Aguinagalde in 2010
- Born: 7 October 1966 (age 59); Vitoria-Gasteiz, Basque Country, Spain
- Occupation: Actor

Gorka Aguinagalde (born 7 October 1966) is a Spanish actor.

== Life and career ==
Gorka Aguinagalde was born on 7 October 1966 in Vitoria-Gasteiz, Álava. He studied theatre both in his hometown (at the Taller de Artes Escénicas) and in Barcelona (at El Timbal drama school). In 2022, he directed his first short film, El fiestón, alongside Xabi Vitoria.

== Filmography ==
=== Film ===
Year	Title	Role	Notes	Ref.
1997	Airbag		Feature film debut	
1999	Muertos de risa (Dying of Laughter)			
2000	Año mariano (The Year of Maria)			
2000	La comunidad (Common Wealth)			
2002	El robo más grande jamás contado (The Biggest Robbery Never Told)			
2006	El síndrome de Svensson			
2008	La buena nueva (The Good News)	Hugo		
2011	Fuga de cerebros 2			
2015	Rey gitano (Gipsy King)			
2019	Perdiendo el este			

=== Television ===
Year	Title	Role	Notes	Ref.
2004	Ana y los 7		Television debut	
2005	El comisario			
2010	Doctor Mateo			
2012–2013	Luna, el misterio de Calenda	Francisco Elías, Mayor of Calenda		
2013	Cuéntame cómo pasó			
2015–2019	Allí abajo			
2020	Benidorm			
