= Elite (TV series) =

Spanish teen drama television series

- Genre: Thriller; Teen drama
- Created by: Carlos Montero; Darío Madrona
- Starring: see List of Elite characters
- Composer: Lucas Vidal
- Country of origin: Spain
- Original language: Spanish
- No. of seasons: 8
- No. of episodes: 64 (list of episodes)

Production
- Executive producers: Carlos Montero; Darío Madrona; Diego Betancor; Iñaki Juaristi
- Producer: Francisco Ramos
- Cinematography: Daniel Sosa Segura; Ricardo de Gracia
- Editors: Irene Blecua; Ascen Marchena
- Camera setup: Single-camera
- Running time: 41–61 minutes 10–15 minutes (short stories)
- Production company: Zeta Producciones

Original release
- Network: Netflix
- Release: 5 October 2018 – 26 July 2024

Related
- Class; Blood & Water; AlRawabi School for Girls

Elite (Spanish: Élite; stylized as E L I T Ǝ) is a Spanish teen drama series created by Carlos Montero and Darío Madrona for Netflix. The show is set in Las Encinas, a fictional elite high school which caters to privileged and wealthy teenagers. Elite initially focuses on three working-class students who win their enrollment at Las Encinas through a scholarship program, and on the social and romantic interactions that they have with several students there. The series ran for eight seasons from 5 October 2018 to 26 July 2024.

Though the series does have its share of light-hearted moments, Elite mainly centres around the trials and tribulations of its protagonists, exploring "hot-button", progressive issues such as homosexuality, classism, parental neglect, and illicit activities including drug use, crime and murder.

The debut season, comprising eight episodes, premiered on Netflix on 5 October 2018, earning positive reviews from critics and viewers who described the series as a "guilty pleasure". The writing, acting, and portrayal of mature themes were particularly praised. Over the next six years, seven more eight-episode seasons have premiered on Netflix. The eighth and final season was released on 26 July 2024.

== Plot ==
=== Season 1 ===
Three young friends – Samuel, Nádia, and Christian – receive scholarships from a construction company after a collapse suffered at their previous school due to poorly executed works. Their new school is Las Encinas, a prestigious institute in Spain where the country's elite send their children to study. In Las Encinas, the popular kids rule. Meet wealthy siblings Marina and Guzmán, whose father controls the construction company blamed for the collapse of the roof of their old school. Then, there's Guzmán's casual girlfriend, Lu, the director's son, Ander, and the couple Pólo and Carla. With Samuel's brother, recently released from prison, Nano throwing himself in the mix and Nádia's brother, Omar also becoming involved in the clash of lifestyles, resentment, envy and sexual attraction ensue. Through a series of flash-forward scenes, beginning with the opening of the first episode, it is shown that the unfolding stories of a clash of lifestyles somehow led to down in Marina's mysterious murder. The plot has two timelines, one showing of police interrogations and the other showing the stories of the characters' relationships that led to Marina's murder.

=== Season 2 ===
- Slogan: Lies bring us together and lies tear us apart.

After the revelation of classmate Marina's death, and the subsequent disappearance of Samuel, the second season revolves around the students returning to school for their senior year, focusing primarily on their first semester. They are accompanied by three new classmates – Rebeka, Cayetana and Valerio who all harbour dark secrets of their own. The new characters befriend their classmates, as Samuel persists in his mission to vindicate his brother, Nano, who was falsely accused of Marina's murder. Polo contemplates suicide, in an effort to alleviate his guilt, but ultimately finds solace and happiness with the support of Cayetana. Anders' mental health declines under the weight of Polo's secret. Carla, misled into thinking Samuel is deceased, confesses knowledge of Polo's crime.

=== Season 3 ===
- Slogan: Together until death.

The students enter their last semester at Las Encinas. In a scene from the future, the students are being interrogated by police regarding Polo's death during a graduation party. Polo and Cayetana are shunned by their peers, with the exception of Valerio. Samuel and Guzman continue their plot to avenge Polo's crimes. Lu and Nadia compete for a scholarship to Columbia University, leading the two to form a mutual friendship. Ander is diagnosed with leukaemia and begins chemotherapy, causing friction between him and his loved ones. On the night of their graduation, in a drunken stupor, Lu accidentally stabs Polo, who stumbles and falls to his death. The group collectively agrees to cover-up the murder. Unable to find a suspect, Polo's death is ultimately ruled as a suicide, with his parents eventually telling police that he had confessed to Marina's murder.

=== Season 4 ===
- Slogan: They have everything but they want more.

As a new year begins at Las Encinas, a fresh mystery unfolds with the arrival of the new principal, Benjamin and his children – Ari, Mencía, and Patrick. The narrative takes a turn when Ari is found on the brink of death, and each plot thread, revealed through flash-forwards, sheds light on the circumstances leading to this incident. Benjamin's kids, along with the French prince Philippe who got caught up in a scandal, join the same class as Samuel, Guzmán, Rebeka and Ander, who have to repeat their final year, and Omar, who becomes a new student of Las Encinas. Cayetana becomes the new maid of the school and she forms a bond with Phillipe, a wealthy student with a dark past. The dynamics between the new and veteran students start to develop. Simultaneously, Mencía becomes involved in prostitution under the influence of Armando, a businessman associated with Benjamin. Eventually, it is unveiled that the attempted murder of Ari and Armando's death are intricately linked.

=== Season 5 ===
- Slogan: Desire, excess, redemption, rebellion.

Following Armando's demise at the hands of Guzmán, both he and Ander decide to leave school and embark on a journey around the world. Samuel and Rebeka choose to keep the truth concealed from everyone, including Omar, Cayetana, Ari, Mencía, and Patrick. However, when Armando's body is discovered, it triggers a sequence of events that unravels their relationships, altering their lives irrevocably. Additionally, two new students – Isadora and Iván – enroll at Las Encinas, forming connections with current upperclassmen, particularly Phillipe and Patrick. Yet, some of these relationships prove to be perilous. In a flash-forward, Samuel's lifeless body is found floating in a pool, and each plot thread leads to the revelation of how he ended up there, uncovering the truth behind the events.

=== Season 6 ===
Three months after the death of Samuel and Benjamin's arrest for his murder, a new year of school begins. Omar, Rebeka and Phillipe have since graduated and moved out of Madrid. Meanwhile Ari, Patrick and Mencía are forced to repeat their final year after dropping out the previous spring due to their father's arrest. Meanwhile, Iván and Isadora are entering their final year. They are greeted by some new students: Nico, Rocío, Dídac, Sonia and Sara along with Sara's abusive boyfriend, Raúl. Many situations occurred during the season, and the flash-forward event that characterises this season is Iván's accident after he has been hit by a car, and his subsequent coma.

=== Season 7 ===
Two weeks following the events of the previous season, Omar, now at the university, seizes the opportunity to participate in an internship at Las Encinas. Concurrently, he grapples with depression that began a year earlier with Samuel's death. Omar is in a relationship with Joel who also starts attending Las Encinas. Meanwhile, Patrick, Ari, and Mencía have relocated from Madrid, and Iván is recuperating from an accident. Isadora navigates the challenges in her relationship with Didàc, while Sara contends with her toxic connection to Raúl. Nico, Sonia, and Rocío face their own set of problems. A peculiar new student, Chloe and her enigmatic mother, Carmen make an entrance. Additionally, Nico's cousin, Eric enrolls at Las Encinas. This season marks the first to solely feature a flash-forward event in the final episode, centering around the eventual murder of Raúl.

=== Season 8 ===
- Slogan: Goodbye forever, forever.

A few weeks after the events of the previous season, the students are going to finish their last year and an association of old students of Las Encinas, the Alumni Club, led by the controversial Héctor and Emilia Krawietz is searching new recruits. Meanwhile Dídac and Rocío moved away from Madrid. Eric and Chloe start a turbulent relationship. Sara is trying to overcome Raúl's death, creating a new bond with Nico. Sonia and Dalmar start a relationship too. Isadora faces problems with her family and the police, while Iván, who has returned from South Africa, tries to recreate a bond with Joel. The Alumni Club is becoming more and more treacherous and Omar, who knows Las Encinas very well, tries to fight it, with the help of his sister Nadia. Much happens during this season, but the flash-forward event that characterises it is Joel's murder, the key event that will lead to the final closure of Las Encinas at the end of the season. In fact all the murders and events of past year related to Las Encinas (Marina's murder, Polo's death, Samuel's accidental murder, Iván's accident, Raúl's death and Joel's murder) were hidden to the public. Omar and Nadia with the help of Principal Virginia give all the information to the press, making Las Encinas close forever.

== Cast and characters ==
=== Introduced in season 1 ===
- María Pedraza as Marina Nunier Osuna (season 1), Guzmán's sister and love interest of Nano and Samuel. She comes from a wealthy family and has a streak of falling for the 'bad boy'. She rebels against her family's hypocritical ways while maintaining a youthful, joyful spirit. She is murdered in season 1.
- Itzan Escamilla as Samuel García Domínguez (seasons 1–5), one of three transfer students, who is the love interest of Marina and later falls for Carla in season 2. A hardworking, shy and tricky guy. He always looks out for the people around him. He is justice-driven and will go to extreme lengths to ensure that everyone gets what they deserve. Right before the graduation at the end of season 3, he is expelled from school with Guzmán for bullying Polo, so he has to repeat the last year. He is accidentally seriously injured by Benjamin at the end of season 5, with his death announced at the beginning of season 6.
- Miguel Bernardeau as Guzmán Nunier Osuna (seasons 1–4), adopted brother of Marina, and Lu's ex-boyfriend, who falls for Nadia. A hot-headed, popular guy at school. He believes his way is always the right way. He is extremely protective of his sister and does not bond well with the transfer students. He would do anything for his friends. After Marina's death, he becomes very close to Samuel, with whom he is expelled from school at the end of season 3 for bullying Polo, so he has to repeat the last year of school. At the end of season 4, he and Ander decide to leave the school to travel around the world, after he accidentally killed Armando to defend Ari.
- Miguel Herrán as Christian Varela Expósito (seasons 1–2), (Note: Miguel Herrán is credited as a series regular from season 1, episode 1 through season 2, episode 1.) one of three transfer students, who gets into a relationship with Polo and Carla. A comical and carefree transfer student who tries to stay connected with his past while trying to assimilate with the richer students. In season 2, he is deliberately run over by Carla's father, leaving him seriously injured, and is transferred to another hospital in Switzerland to prevent the truth about Marina's murder from being revealed.
- Jaime Lorente as Fernando "Nano" García Domínguez (seasons 1–2), (Note: Jaime Lorente is credited as a series regular up until season 2, episode 6.) Samuel's older brother, who just got out of prison, and is also a love interest of Marina. His handsome and dangerous aura draws Marina in. He struggles to pay a debt from prison and will do anything to get his hands on money. He is caring and sensitive to the people close to him. He often finds himself in trouble.
- Álvaro Rico as Leopoldo "Polo" Benavent Villada (seasons 1–3), Carla's ex-boyfriend and Cayetana's love interest. He is submissive in nature and will follow the orders of the people he is close to. He is extremely wealthy, the son of two mothers, and has anxiety attacks. He murdered Marina at the end of season 1. He is bisexual, and for this reason, he has a triangle relationship with both Cayetana and Valerio in season 3. At the end of season 3, he dies after being stabbed with a bottleneck by Lu and falling through a glass balcony.
- Arón Piper as Ander Muñoz (seasons 1–4), son of the principal who falls for Omar. He is a star athlete and under constant pressure from his parents to excel in everything he does. This pushes him to take drugs. He is driven to get what he wants while caring deeply for the people that matters most to him. He is gay. In season 3, he discovers he has a rare form of leukaemia, and for this reason, he walks away from both his friends and Omar, but he manages to overcome the disease, then has to repeat the last year of school. In season 4, he and Omar have a triangle relationship with Patrick. At the end of season 4, he and Guzmán decide to leave the school to travel around the world. After some months, he and Omar break up.
- Mina El Hammani as Nadia Shanaa (seasons 1–4, (Note: Mina El Hammani is credited as a series regular season 1, episode 1 through season 4, episode 4.) 8 (Note: Mina El Hammani is credited as a series regular in season 8, episodes 1, 2, 7 and 8.)), one of three transfer students, the daughter of Palestinian immigrants, and the love interest of Guzmán. She is academically driven and holds her religious and personal values close to her. She was eventually banned from wearing the hijab at school, and the more she assimilates with the school culture, the more she gains her independence from her overprotective parents. After graduation, she goes to the university in New York, along with Lu, who becomes her best friend. Nadia came back in some capacity in season 8.
- Ester Expósito as Carla Rosón Caleruega (seasons 1–3), Polo's ex-girlfriend and Christian's sex partner who later falls in love with Samuel. She is beautiful, cold, and manipulative. She is the daughter of a marchioness and is extremely wealthy. She uses her sexuality to get what she wants. A softer side of her is shown as she cares for the people she loves, goes to extreme lengths to cover up their faults, and supports them. After graduation, she moves to London for university.
- Omar Ayuso as Omar Shanaa (seasons 1–5, 7–8), Nadia's brother, who falls for Ander against his father's wishes. He is a closeted gay guy who struggles with pleasing his parents while living his true self. He dealt drugs to make enough money to move out. He is shy, detail-oriented, and best friends with Samuel. In season 3, he resumes his school studies and enrolls at Las Encinas. In season 4, he and Ander have a love triangle with Patrick. After Samuel's death, he graduates and goes to the university. In season 7, during his first year of university, he returns to Las Encinas due to a stage at the school, having to deal with depression after Samuel's death. Now he has a relationship with Joel, living with him and Dalmar. During season 7, Omar and Joel break up for a long time, then they remain friends.
- Danna as Lucrecia "Lu" Montesinos Hendrich (seasons 1–3), Guzmán's ex-girlfriend who shares an incestuous relationship with her half-brother, Valerio. She is strong-witted, competitive, and manipulative. She will go to extreme lengths to secure what she believes will bring her happiness; however, she is aware that she will never be satisfied no matter how much she has. She had a strong dislike for Nadia, but they eventually became friends. She is also extremely wealthy. She accidentally murders Polo at the end of the third season by stabbing him with the end of a bottleneck, which causes him to fall through a glass balcony. After graduating, she moves to New York to attend university with Nadia, who becomes her best friend.
- Abdelatif Hwidar as Yusef Shanaa (season 8; (Note: Abdelatif Hwidar is credited as a series regular in season 8, episodes 1, 5 and 7.) guest, season 7; recurring, seasons 1–3), Nadia and Omar's father who is very strict with his children and thinks Spanish values are corrupting them. In season 3, he becomes a better person, accepting Omar's sexuality and approving of Nadia's relationship with Guzmán, whom he previously disliked for his arrogant attitude.
- Farah Hamed as Imán Shanaa (season 8; (Note: Farah Hamed is credited as a series regular in season 8, episodes 1, 5 and 7.) guest, season 7; recurring, seasons 1–3), Nadia and Omar's mother.

=== Introduced in season 2 ===
- Jorge López as Valerio Montesinos Rojas (seasons 2–3), Lu's Chilean half-brother. He is a drug addict, likes to party, and will do anything for Lu, with whom he shares an incestuous relationship. He eventually befriends Nadia. At the end of season 3, he is expelled for being involved in Rebeka's drug-selling at the school, but instead of repeating the year, Carla leaves him in charge of her father's wineries while she studies abroad in London.
- Claudia Salas as Rebeka Parrilla de Bormujo Ávalos (seasons 2–5), a rebellious, wealthy girl who has a crush on Samuel. She is different from the other wealthier students in her class, as she likes to flaunt her wealth through extravagantly expensive clothes and jewellery. She was not born into wealth, which causes her to sympathise a lot with Nadia, Omar, and Samuel. Her mother is involved in the drug trade. From season 4, she has a turbulent relationship with Mencía. She leaves the school and the city after Samuel's death.
- Georgina Amorós as Cayetana Grajera Pando (seasons 2–5), (Note: Georgina Amorós is credited as a series regular from season 2, episode 2.) the daughter of a cleaning lady who lives a fraudulent lifestyle and is the love interest of Polo. She is manipulative to the point of fabricating an entire lifestyle to assimilate with the wealthier students in her class. She befriends Lu and goes to extreme lengths to prove her wealth. Her mother, a cleaning lady, works at the school where she disapproves of her daughter's lies. After Polo's death, she accepts her non-wealthy life and becomes the new school cleaner. She also has a relationship with Phillipe before falling for Felipe at the end of season 5.

=== Introduced in season 3 ===
- Leïti Sène as Malick Diallo (season 3), a love interest of Omar. He is flirtatious and manipulative, using Nadia as a beard to get closer to Omar. He is wealthy and puts on a performance to appear to be a 'good' Muslim.
- Sergio Momo as Yeray Engonga (season 3), (Note: Sergio Momo is credited as a series regular in season 3, episodes 2 to 7.) a love interest of Carla's. A young, wealthy student who started up his own business. He was initially overweight and was bullied for it constantly, but Carla gave him the confidence to change his habits. He is superficial, seeing Carla as an ornament he can parade around, but he ultimately shows a more caring side.

=== Introduced in season 4 ===
- Carla Díaz as Ariadna "Ari" Blanco Commerford (seasons 4–6), Patrick's twin sister and Mencía's older sister, caught in a relationship between Samuel and Guzmán. She is seriously injured in season 4, with her attempted homicide being central to the season. In season 5, she continues her relationship with Samuel, while having an affair with Iván. She has an affair with Nico in season 6. When her father is released from jail, she and her family move elsewhere at the end of season 6 to start a new life.
- Martina Cariddi as Mencía Blanco Commerford (seasons 4–6), Ari and Patrick's younger sister, she forms a relationship with Rebeka while also working as a prostitute. In season 6, she becomes close to Sara and Raúl, a strange, toxic couple, trying to help Sara get away from him. When her father is released from jail, she and her family move elsewhere at the end of season 6 to start a new life.
- Manu Ríos as Patrick Blanco Commerford (seasons 4–6), Ari's twin brother and Mencía's older brother, who becomes in season 4 the lover of both Omar and Ander. In season 5, he has a sexual affair with Iván's father, Cruz, and then falls in love with Iván at the end of the season. In season 6, he and Iván have a turbulent relationship, even though they love each other, and Patrick decides to leave him for a while before he wakes up from a coma, then comes back together happily. When his father is released from jail, he and his family move elsewhere to start a new life.
- Pol Granch as Phillipe Florian von Triesenberg (seasons 4–5), a prince who forms a relationship with Cayetana. The direct heir to the throne of a Central European principality. In season 5, he has a fake relationship with Isadora, but she helps her to report the people who raped her. He then goes back to the principality after graduation.
- Andrés Velencoso as Armando de la Ossa (seasons 4–5), (Note: Andrés Velencoso is credited as a series regular from season 4, episode 1 through season 5, episode 4.) an older man who pays Mencía for sex. At the end of season 4, he tries to kill Ari, and for this reason, he is murdered by Guzmán, with his body thrown into a lake by Guzmán, Rebeka, and Samuel. His body is found during season 5.
- Diego Martín as Benjamín Blanco (seasons 4–6), the new school principal and Patrick, Ari, and Mencía's father. At the end of season 5, he goes to jail after he accidentally murdered Samuel, but is then released at the end of season 6, and he and his son and his daughters move elsewhere to start a new life.

=== Introduced in season 5 ===
- Valentina Zenere as Isadora Artiñán Goldstein (seasons 5–8), the wealthy DJ and it girl nicknamed "Empress of Ibiza" who develops a fake relationship with Phillipe, with her falling in love, but those feelings are not reciprocated by him. She is raped by Hugo, Álex, and Javier at the end of season 5, and she begins to have panic anxiety. She then develops a friendship and eventually romantic feelings for Dídac in season 6. In season 7, she continues her relationship with Dídac, against her family's will. Her father is arrested for corruption along with Rocío's mother at the end of season 7. In season 8, she has to deal with the consequences of her father's arrest, the struggle to save her club, her relationship with her parents, and the harassment from Inspector Lluis. She ends up murdering Lluis for revenge at the end of season 8.
- André Lamoglia as Iván Cruz Carvalho (seasons 5–8), son of Cruz, a famous football player, and Carmen. He is attracted to Ari while falling for Patrick at the end of season 5. In season 6, he gets hit by a car driven by Sara and falls into a coma. He and Patrick have a turbulent relationship, even if they love each other, and Patrick decides to go away from him for a while, only to eventually come back together, right before he wakes up miraculously from the coma. In season 7, he tries to forget Patrick and has an affair with Joel. He then goes to South Africa at the end of the season for a cultural exchange. In season 8, he's considered a suspect in Joel's murder.
- Carloto Cotta as Cruz Carvalho (seasons 5–7), (Note: Carloto Cotta is credited as a series regular of season 5, episode 1, and from episode 4 to season 6, episode 4. In season 7, he is credited in episode 5.) Iván's father and a world-famous footballer, who is hiding the truth about his sexuality and his relationship with Patrick. He is brutally murdered in season 6 by homophobes in a hate crime after publicly coming out. In season 7, it is revealed that he had a son, Iván, with Carmen, Chloe's mother.
- Adam Nourou as Bilal Ibrahim (seasons 5–6), (Note: Adam Nourou is credited as a series regular of season 5, episodes 2, 3, and 4, and from season 5, episode 8 to season 6, episode 7.) a homeless young man from the Comoros who leans on Omar for support. In season 6, he works as a waiter at Isadora's hotel, while developing a relationship with Rocío.
- Guillermo Campra as Hugo Múler (season 6; guest season 5), one of Isadora's rapists, who goes to extreme lengths to get away with the crime. He gets arrested along with Álex and Javier, who alerted the police, after trying to rape another girl.
- Ignacio Carrascal as Javier Cáceres (season 6; guest season 5), another of Isadora's rapists and Dídac's former best friend, who feels remorse for what he did to her. He calls the police on Hugo, Álex, and himself to make up for it.
- Marc Bonnin as Alejandro "Álex" Díaz (season 6; guest season 5), another of Isadora's rapists and Hugo's loyal second-in-command. He gets arrested along with Hugo and Javier, who alerted the police, after trying to rape another girl.

=== Introduced in season 6 ===
- Carmen Arrufat as Sara (seasons 6–8), an influencer who is in a toxic relationship with Raúl, who continually abuses her. Mencía tries to help her to get away from him. She accidentally hits Iván with a car, keeping the secret from Raúl and instead trying to blame Mencía, who was on drugs in the car during the crash. During season 7, she tries to get away from Raúl, with Jessica's help. They break up at the end of the season, before Rául's murder.
- Álex Pastrana as Raúl (seasons 6–7), Sara's abusive boyfriend, who manipulates her and wants to get her away from Mencía. Raúl is obsessive and controlling. He is always checking on his girlfriend to see where she is and resorts to physical violence. In season 7, he continues his turbulent relationship with Sara, then breaks up. He then has an affair with Chloe. During an argument, he is thrown from a building by Carmen.
- Álvaro de Juana as Dídac Ramos Vico (seasons 6–7), a wary guy who initially befriends the guys who rape Isadora. He belongs to a wealthy family of hoteliers, who are against Isadora's family. He starts to believe Isadora, and then he helps her to get his friends arrested. They fall in love at the end of season 6. Even if their families are enemies, he and Isadora continue their relationship in season 7.
- Ander Puig as Nicolás "Nico" Fernández de Velasco Viveros (seasons 6–8), a transgender guy who has a relationship with Sonia, while falling for Ari. He returns to school after having gender affirmation surgery and has his name legally changed. Ari has a difficult time accepting Nico's gender identity, causing Nico to become insecure. In season 7, he continues his relationship with Sonia while having an affair with Chloe.
- Ana Bokesa (Note: Ana Bokesa is credited as a series regular from season 6, episode 2.) as Rocío (seasons 6–7), a wealthy girl of Guinean descent who forms a relationship with Bilal. Rocío wants to connect with her African heritage and culture. She takes an interest in Bilal and flirts with him, but at first, the feelings are not reciprocated. Unlike Rocío, Bilal is not as interested in connecting with his African heritage until he finds out about her social condition. In season 7, she has an affair with Eric, trying to help him with his disease. Her mother is arrested for corruption at the end of season 7, along with Isadora's father.
- Nadia Al Saidi as Sonia (seasons 7–8; recurring season 6), Nico's girlfriend who then becomes very close to Ari and supports her to get an abortion. She is a sensitive and friendly girl who is often seen offering emotional support to others. After breaking up with Nico at the end of season 6, they have a push-and-pull throughout season 7. She also becomes very close to Omar, helping him with his stage.
- Iván Mendes as Dalmar (seasons 7–8; (Note: Iván Mendes does not appear and is not credited as a series regular in season 7, episode 2.) guest season 6), Joel and Omar's friend and housemate. He works as a delivery boy, and during his work, he's the only one who sees Carmen killing Raúl.
- Luz Cipriota as Roberta Goldstein (season 8; (Note: Luz Cipriota is credited as a series regular in season 8, episodes 1 and 3.) recurring seasons 6–7), the owner of Isadora's House and Isadora's mother who is at war with Dídac's family due to them being involved in the hotel business, and goes to great lengths to separate Isadora and Dídac. She is revealed to be behind the school's shooting that happened at the end of season 6 and poisoning her own mare in season 7. In season 8, after Martín is arrested, she pressures Isadora into selling the business. However, Martín is killed in prison, and Roberta disowns Isadora, blaming her for his death.
- Godeliv Van den Brandt as Virginia (season 8; (Note: Godeliv Van den Brandt is credited as a series regular in season 8, episodes 1, 2, 6 and 8.) recurring seasons 6–7), the new school principal who replaces Benjamín after he is arrested.
- Pepe Ocio as Alfonso (season 8; (Note: Pepe Ocio is credited as a series regular in season 8, episode 5.) recurring seasons 6–7), a doctor and Nico's father and Eric's uncle.
- Olaya Caldera as María (season 8; (Note: Olaya Caldera is credited as a series regular in season 8, episode 5.) recurring seasons 6–7), Nico's mother and Eric's aunt.

=== Introduced in season 7 ===
- Fernando Líndez as Joel Castellano Soler (seasons 7–8), a sensitive guy who begins to attend Las Encinas. He is Omar's boyfriend, then breaks up with him during season 7. He has an affair with Iván. In season 8, he has a turbulent relationship with Iván while having a fling with Héctor. He is killed by Luís during the season.
- Mirela Balić as Chloe Ibarra Silva (seasons 7–8), Carmen's daughter. She is an attractive, manipulative girl with a complex relationship with her mother. In season 7, she has an affair with Eric, then she becomes Raúl's girlfriend, before her mother kills him. In season 8, she starts a turbulent relationship with Eric while having a fling with Dalmar. At the end of the season, she moved away from Madrid with her mother to start a new life.
- Gleb Abrosimov as Eric de Velasco Viveros (seasons 7–8), a problematic and bipolar guy who begins to attend Las Encinas. He is Nico's cousin, and he goes to live with him and his family. In season 7, he has an affair with Chloe and Rocío. In season 8, she starts a turbulent relationship with Chloe while having a fling with Emilia. When Las Encinas closes for good at the end of the season, he graduates from a public school with the other students.
- Alejandro Albarracín as Luís Marín (seasons 7–8), (Note: Alejandro Albarracín does not appear and is not credited as a series regular in season 8, episode 4.) a detective who goes to Las Encinas to supervise the school after the shooting at the end of season 6. He arrests Isadora's father and Rocío's mother at the end of season 7. In season 8, he becomes obsessed with Isadora, and after being threatened by Joel, Luis kills him. While he is arrested for the murder, Isadora kills him with a poisoned syringe.
- Leonardo Sbaraglia as Martín Artiñán (seasons 7-8), (Note: Leonoardo Sbaraglia is credited as a series regular from season 7, episode 4 through episode 8, and in season 8, episode 3. He does not appear and is not credited in season 7, episode 7.) Isadora's father and a powerful crime lord who returns to Madrid to make her daughter the owner of his and her mother Roberta's hotel business. Martín also bribes Catalina, a high-ranking judge, to keep the business afloat. He is arrested by the police after Isadora tricks him into confessing to his crimes by wearing a hidden microphone. In season 8, he is killed in prison.
- Maribel Verdú as Carmen Silva (seasons 7–8), Chloe and Iván's mother. She kills Raúl by pushing him off a balcony when he tries to assault her daughter.
- Anitta as Jessica (season 7), (Note: Anitta is credited as a series regular in season 7, episodes 2, 3, 5, and 8.) the PE teacher who also teaches self-defense to help Sara get out of her abusive relationship with Raúl.
- Khosi Ngema as Fikile "Fiks" Bhele (season 7), (Note: Khosi Ngema receives a "Special Guestar" credit and is credited as a series regular in season 7, episode 4.) an exchange student who befriends Iván. She is one of the main characters from Blood & Water.
- María Ordóñez as Luena (season 8; (Note: María Ordóñez is credited as a series regular in season 8, episodes 1, 6, 7 and 8.) recurring season 7), a by-the-book cop and Luis's partner.
- Alfons Nieto as José Luis (season 8; (Note: Alfons Nieto is credited as a series regular in season 8, episode 6.) guest season 7), Cruz's lawyer and Carmen's friend.

=== Introduced in season 8 ===
- Nuno Gallego as Héctor Krawietz (season 8), a former Las Encinas student, who is the President of Alumni Club and Emilia's brother. He is a manipulative guy who falls for Joel after having had a fling with him. At the end of season 8, he goes to study in Italy with his sister.
- Ane Rot as Emilia Krawietz (season 8), a former Las Encinas student, who is the Vice-President of Alumni Club and Héctor's sister. She is a smart and seductive girl who is obsessed with her brother. She has a fling with Eric. At the end of season 8, she goes to study in Italy with her brother.
- Mario Ermito as Pier (season 8), (Note: Mario Ermito is credited as a series regular in season 8, episodes 4, 5 and 7.) a former Las Encinas student, who is a member of Alumni and Guillermina's husband. He is from Italy and attended the school as an exchange student.
- Alexandra Pino as Guillermina (season 8), (Note: Alexandra Pino is credited as a series regular in season 8, episodes 4, 5 and 7.) a former Las Encinas student, who is a member of Alumni and Pier's wife.

== Production ==
=== Development and themes ===
I am excited at producing Elite at this stage of my career. This is a lot of fun. With the golden age of series, I can now achieve in TV what I wanted to do with movies in the last few years. [...] Producers, directors, and writers can now go back and forth between film and TV. Netflix especially has been very good in this sense in that that they bring together two different media.

— Francisco Ramos, producer

On 17 July 2017, it was announced that Netflix had given the production a series order for a first season; it is the second Netflix original series in Spain after Cable Girls. The series is created by Carlos Montero and Darío Madrona, who are both credited as executive producers of the series; as Netflix announced the order, The Hollywood Reporter wrote that the series' team "boasts one of the most successful writing teams in Spain's current TV landscape". Montero and Madrona developed the series after being told that Netflix was looking for a teenage show and were asked to produce an idea. Montero came up with the basic premise and the pair worked on it before presenting it to Netflix a month later.

At the time, Erik Barmack, Netflix's VP of original series, said that Elite would be "a very different kind of teen thriller that will cross borders and affect audiences globally". Still, the creators said that the series has a lot of Spanish themes and Spanish identity, to give it "a sense of place and time, that it is a series of this moment and of this country", and to prevent it from becoming a "series that could happen anywhere in the world [because if they try to make something] that can be understood everywhere, in the end, it is not understood anywhere". In September 2018, it was announced that the series would premiere on 5 October 2018. Producer Francisco Ramos spoke about some of the decisions in creating the show in an interview before it was released. He said that the choice to set the mystery drama in a high school was important because "it is the time of your life when things matter the most", allowing them to explore the pressures of fitting in as an elite alongside the other plot lines.

On 17 October 2018, Netflix renewed the series for a second season. During this period, it was increasing production in Spain after having constructed new production facilities in Madrid. As Netflix renewed the show, it announced that there were still discussions on which characters would appear. The second season was released on 6 September 2019; it began production after the viewership for the first season was known, in January 2019, though it had been written before season 1 had been released.

The internal structure of the show uses flash-forwards to advance the plot and the mystery, which Variety compared to that of Big Little Lies. When speaking of the innovation in the second season, co-creator Darío Madrona said that they "wanted to keep the fast-forward formula as a staple of the series, but at the same time be different". Madrona said: "In the first season, we were conscious that we were making a series for Netflix, and tried to put everything into it [...] For season 2, we thought that we had the opportunity to explore the characters and the new ones as well. But it was an instinctive decision." Variety wrote that the second season, therefore, may be similar to Stranger Things season 3 in the way it compares to its more plot-driven predecessor seasons and how it "drives deeper into [the characters'] interaction, in continued coming of age narratives which are deeply inflected by class and economics". The production values and costs were also raised for season 2 to allow the creators more freedom.

The character Cayetana (Georgina Amorós), introduced in season 2, is said to tackle the topic of appearances being everything–a theme of the series–from a different angle. She is a social media influencer and, according to Amorós, "isn't at all what she seems". Social media is another theme examined in season 2, with Darío Madrona and actress Mina El Hammani commenting on how it gives a perception of someone being good if people like who they are on the Internet, which can be dangerous.

On 29 August 2019, it was reported that the series was renewed for a third season, before the second season had aired. The third season's logo was stylized as "ELIT3". The third season premiered on 13 March 2020.

On 20 January 2020, it was announced that the series had been renewed for a fourth and fifth season.

On 22 May 2020, Netflix officially announced the show's renewal for the fourth season, which was already in development. The fifth season was confirmed on 25 February 2021, before the release of the fourth season. The fourth season premiered on 18 June 2021.

On 28 October 2021, Netflix officially announced the renewal for the sixth season of the show.

On 24 October 2022, it was announced that Netflix renewed the series for a seventh season, with Omar Ayuso returning.

On 19 July 2023, the series was renewed for an eighth season, which was later confirmed by Netflix to be the final season of the show on October 18.

=== Casting ===
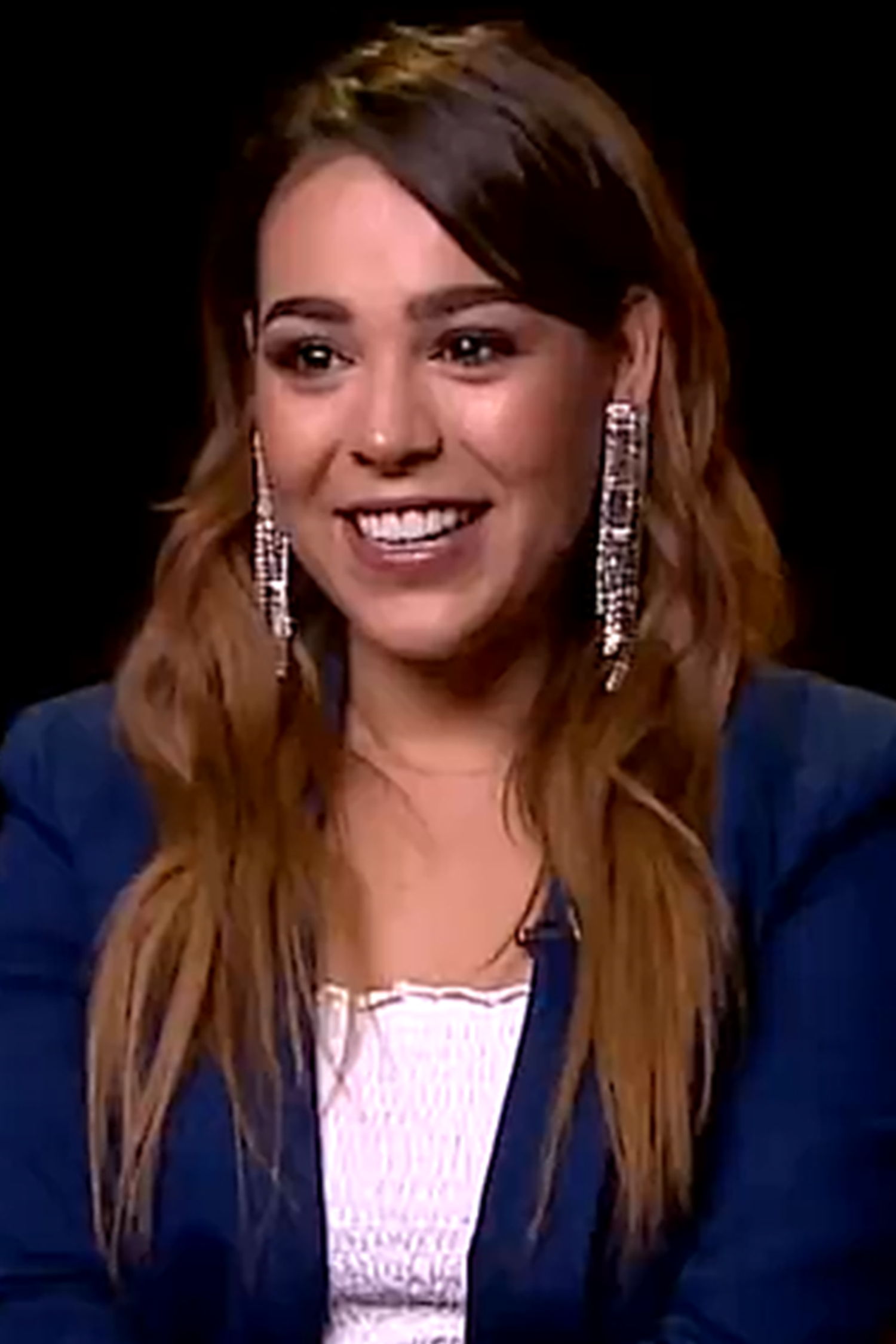
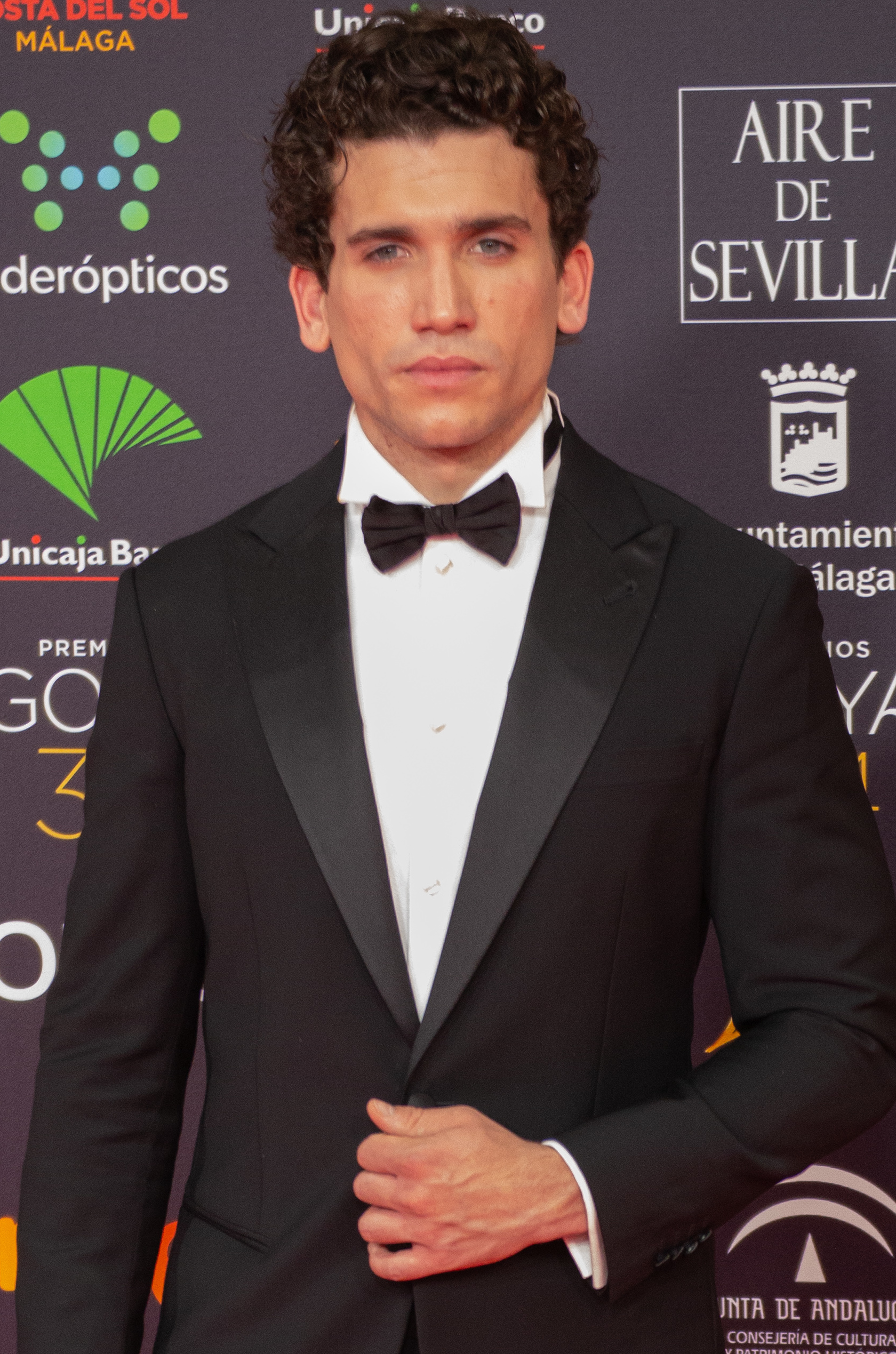
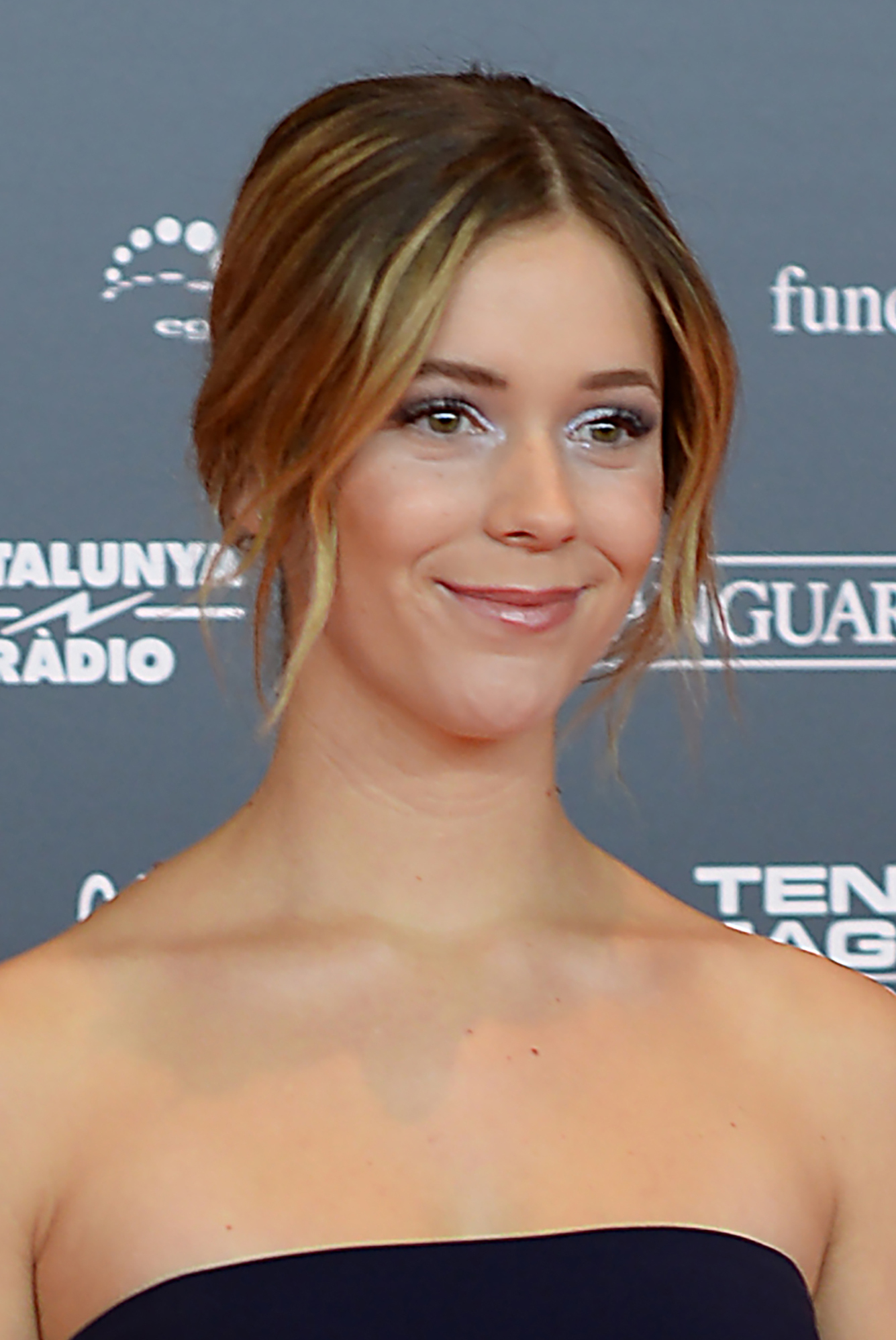
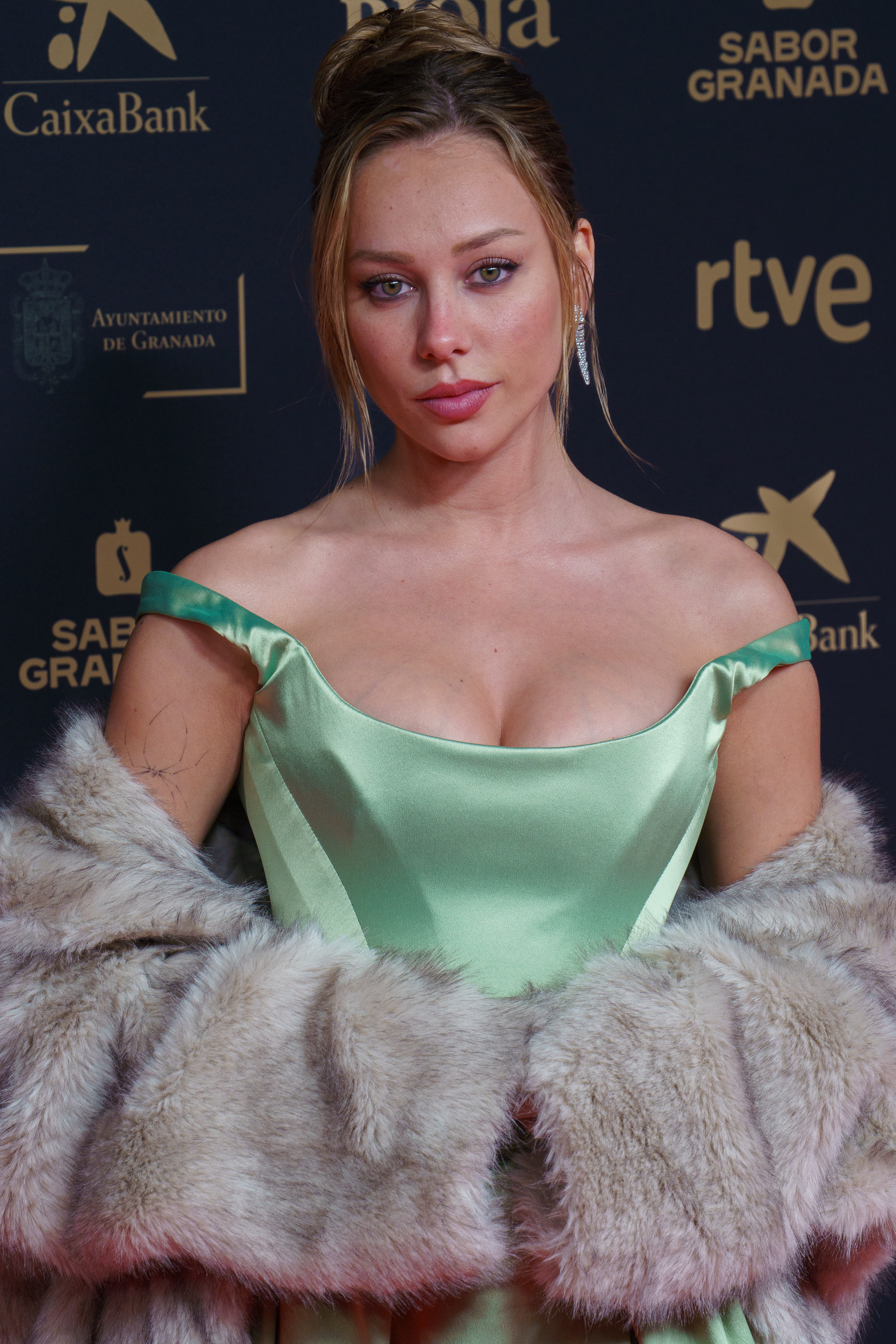
Danna Paola, Jaime Lorente, Georgina Amorós, and Ester Expósito (L-R) had already starred in Netflix-distributed works before being cast in the Netflix original series.

Variety writes that the show's characters all "border stereotypes" but "escape total buttonholing"; director Silvia Quer said she was attracted to the show because of the well-constructed characters. The production was involved in casting for the show.

The initial main cast was confirmed before the series debut, featuring several actors from other Netflix series and films either created or distributed by Netflix España y Latinoamerica, (Note: Of the various works, Cable Girls and The Neighbor are the only Netflix originals. Lo más sencillo es complicarlo todo is a Mexican film that streams on Netflix; Money Heist is a Spanish television series from channel Antena 3 that was distributed on Netflix, with more seasons later produced by Netflix as an original; and Welcome to the Family is a Catalan series from channel TV3, its first season streams on Netflix.) including Itzan Escamilla of Cable Girls, Danna Paola of Lo más sencillo es complicarlo todo, and María Pedraza, Jaime Lorente, and Miguel Herrán of Money Heist. However, acting newcomer Omar Ayuso was also cast as a character (Omar Shanaa) bearing his own given name. For season two, another actress from a Netflix series, Georgina Amorós of the Catalan Welcome to the Family, was added to the cast. Announced shortly before its release, she was joined by Claudia Salas and Jorge López. Two new members of the cast for season 3, and their characters, were introduced in a short Netflix video shared by actress Ester Expósito, on 4 October 2019. They are also actors from other Netflix series: Leïti Sène of Welcome to the Family and Sergio Momo of The Neighbor.

Paola has said in interviews that she almost lost the chance to audition for the show, as the message was sent over email but landed in her spam messages folder. However, she retrieved it and sent in a video audition; the sides for this involved an early scene where her character (Lu) is having a tense conversation with the character Nadia. In the scene, Paola says that she ad-libbed using the sarcastic term of endearment "darling" ("querida" in Spanish), which the creators liked and has since become a catchphrase on the series. On 28 January 2020, it was announced that the series would consist of a new main cast for the fourth season. On 19 May 2020, it was confirmed via Elite's Instagram account that Mina El Hammani, Danna Paola, Ester Expósito, Álvaro Rico, and Jorge López would not return for season 4. Sergio Momo and Leiti Sène, who appeared in a main role in season 3, also would not return for season 4. On 22 May 2020, Itzan Escamilla, Miguel Bernardeau, Arón Piper, Omar Ayuso, Claudia Salas and Georgina Amorós were confirmed to reprise their roles in season 4. On 19 July 2020, Carla Díaz, Manu Ríos, Martina Cariddi, Pol Granch, Diego Martín and Andrés Velencoso were announced to have joined the fourth season's new main cast. On 23 and 28 December 2020, Ester Expósito and Danna Paola have been reported to return for season 5. However, during an interview at El Hormiguero, Paola stated that she left the series to focus entirely on her music career and that there is no possibility for her to return as Lu. Expósito also confirmed that she would not be returning as well, but instead that she would briefly reprise her role in the short stories. On 25 February 2021, along with the fifth season's renewal, Argentine actress Valentina Zenere and Brazilian actor André Lamoglia were officially confirmed to have joined the cast, which was initially rumours of the fans. On 25 March 2021, French actor Adam Nourou announced, via his Instagram account, that he would be joining the main cast of the fifth season. During the shooting of season 5, it was confirmed that Itzan Escamilla, Omar Ayuso, Claudia Salas, Georgina Amorós, Carla Díaz, Martina Cariddi, Manu Rìos and Pol Granch would come back in season 5.. However, Miguel Bernardeau and Aron Piper announced in July 2021 that they would not return for season 5, making Escamilla and Ayuso the only original actors in the series since the first season. On 20 August 2021, it was confirmed that Isabela Garrido, who had previously starred in The Mess You Leave Behind, had joined season 5 on a recurring role.

In December 2021, FormulaTV reported Carmen Arrufat to be an addition to 6th season's cast. In January 2022, Arrufat was confirmed to join the sixth season with Álex Pastrana, Alvaro de Juana, Ander Puig and Ana Bokesa. Guillermo Campra, Marc Bonnin and Ignacio Carrascal were promoted to series regulars. In October 2022, Maribel Verdú, Alejandro Albarracín, Iván Mendes, Gleb Abrosimov, Fernando Líndez and Mirela Balic were included in the cast for the seventh season, while Nadia Al Saidi, who recurred in the sixth season, was promoted to a series regular.

In February 2023, Leonardo Sbaraglia was included in the cast for the seventh season. In March 2023, Anitta was cast in the seventh season.

In July 2023, Ane Rot and Nuno Gallego were cast for the eighth season, while Mina El Hammani was confirmed to reprise her role. Mario Ermito and Alexandra Pino were also cast.

=== Filming ===
The series is filmed in the Madrid region, including parts filmed in San Lorenzo de El Escorial. The mountains to the north of the Spanish capital often feature in the background.

The first two seasons were shot entirely in 4K. In a tweet shared by Expósito in October 2019, the actress revealed that the third season had already completed filming.

The fourth season started filming on 3 August 2020 but suspended a day after. Filming resumed a week after when they reported that the test was fake. It was also revealed that the fifth season is being shot back-to-back with the fourth season. By 22 December 2020, filming for the season had already wrapped.

Filming for the fifth season began in February 2021 and concluded on 15 June in the same year.

Filming for the sixth season began in February 2022 and concluded on 3 June in the same year.

Filming for the seventh season began in November 2022 and concluded on 23 March 2023.

Filming for the eighth season began on 7 August 2023 and concluded on 20 December in the same year.

=== Music ===
Lynn Fainchtein served as the music supervisor of the series. Ricardo Curto scored the series' soundtrack from season six onwards.

== Episodes ==
Season	Episodes	Originally released
1	8	5 October 2018
2	8	6 September 2019
3	8	13 March 2020
4	8	18 June 2021
5	8	8 April 2022
6	8	18 November 2022
7	8	20 October 2023
8	8	26 July 2024

=== Elite: Short Stories ===
In May 2021, Netflix announced #EliteWeek, a week-long special of short episodes that act as a prelude to the fourth season titled Elite: Short Stories. The stories are set to "expand the Elite universe". They are not a spin-off show, but more like vignettes to bridge content that lead up to the fourth season; there are four stories, each consisting of three short episodes. The stories take place during the summer before the start of the new year in Las Encinas. In the four stories, different plots of some of the most veteran students of Las Encinas and newer ones will be explored, revealing what they have been up to in the last summer before starting their new school year. The stories are set between the events of the third and the fourth season.

In October 2021, Netflix announced three new stories, set during the holiday season, will be released in December of that year. These three episodes are set between the events of the fourth and the fifth season.

No.	Title	Directed by	Written by	Original release date
1	"Guzmán, Caye & Rebe"	Dani de la Orden	Carlos Montero	14 June 2021
Rebeka invites Cayetana and Guzmán over for some special cake at her brand-new house. Shenanigans ensue. The three friends panic about what to do when they find a large stash of cocaine hidden in Rebeka's house and Cayetana shares her upcoming job plans. Cayetana and Rebeka argue with Guzmán over how to deal with the men trying to break into the house.
2	"Nadia & Guzmán"	Dani de la Orden	Carlos Montero	15 June 2021
While Nadia gets accustomed to life in New York, an opportunity to visit Madrid arises and she struggles with whether or not to tell Guzmán. Nadia and Guzmán come to an agreement about not seeing each other. Meanwhile, newlywed May gives her little sister advice on love. In an attempt to manage her emotions, Nadia demands Guzmán follow very specific rules for their reunion date.
3	"Omar, Ander & Alexis"	Jorge Torregrossa	Darío Madrona	16 June 2021
After Ander and Omar pay a visit to a defeated Alexis at the hospital, an indiscretion about the past puts Ander in a tough spot. Ander tries to cheer up Alexis and take his mind off things by inviting him to a barbecue at Rebeka's new place. After a heart-to-heart with Ander, Alexis makes a final decision about his treatment.
4	"Carla & Samuel"	Jorge Torregrossa	Carlos Montero	17 June 2021
Samuel bolts to the airport to stop Carla from boarding her plane to London. Carla and Samuel play a sexual question game that leads to a much more serious conversation. A heated disagreement leads to a series of voice messages as Samuel and Carla try and figure out what to do.

No.	Title	Directed by	Written by	Original release date
5	"Phillipe, Caye & Felipe"	Lucía Alemany	Carlos Montero	15 December 2021
While donating clothes with Rebe, Cayetana meets a new friend and volunteers her sewing services for Christmas. When Phillipe's generous donation catches Cayetana off guard and she asks Felipe to do her a favour in exchange for dinner. Cayetana faces off with her ex, who shares his feelings and asks her to consider whether forgiveness is an option.
6	"Samuel & Omar"	Lucía Alemany	Carlos Montero	20 December 2021
Samuel discovers his mother owes thousands of euros in rent and he must find a way to avoid eviction. Omar helps Samuel take enticing photos for his new "Only for You" website, but their plan goes awry. Samuel is despondent about the consequences of his actions, but his friends offer him hope.
7	"Patrick"	Eduardo Chapero-Jackson	Carlos Montero	23 December 2021
Feeling suffocated by his family, Patrick visits a cabin in the woods seeking solitude, but he is met with temptation. The drugs Patrick takes evoke painful memories and cause him to have disturbing visions. Patrick is distraught by his concern for Mencía and heads home to find her. What ensues is a change for his family.

== International adaptations ==
=== Class ===
On 24 September 2022, during the fourth TUDUM Fan Event, Netflix announced an official Indian adaptation of Elite titled Class.

The story is based in New Delhi's upscale school, Hampton International, where three new students from starkly different backgrounds challenge the existing dynamics at the elite enclave and their lives are immeasurably changed by the events that occur there. The Indian adaptation of the show follows the same premise as Elite, but the screenplay has incorporated many changes to keep in mind an Indian audience. Produced by Bodhitree Multimedia Limited, and directed by Ashim Ahluwalia, Class will star Gurfateh Pirzada, Ayesha Kanga, Chayan Chopra, Anjali Sivaraman, Chintan Rach, Madhyama Segal, Cyaawal Singh, Naina Bhan, Moses Koul, Piyush Khati and Zeyn Shaw.

Netflix released Class on 3 February 2023.

== Reception ==
=== Critical response ===
The first season of Elite was met with critical acclaim. On the review aggregator website Rotten Tomatoes, the first season has a 100% approval rating, based on reviews from 14 critics, with an average rating of 8.40/10. The website's critical consensus reads, "Elite is highly digestible, technically strong trash TV for anyone with a guilty pleasure palate." Other reviewers also refer to the show as a guilty pleasure. Natalie Winkelman from The Daily Beast gave the first season a positive review, saying that "with Euro-cool style and compelling characters, Elite is trashy, diverting fun". John Doyle from The Globe and Mail likewise complimented the first season in his review, adding that "Elite is no masterpiece but is one of those oddly satisfying, binge-worthy curiosities." Taylor Antrim of Vogue also said that is worth a binge-watch and "goes down like a cold glass of verdejo". Antrim wrote that the series is an example of Netflix "airing global TV shows that slavishly borrow television tropes", saying that "If it were a CW show I'd hardly give it a second look. But a Spanish prep school is seductive terra incognita" in the positive review.

Élite does indeed include countless teen show clichés, but it also relishes the opportunity to dig a bit deeper and twist them into more interesting shapes. It interrogates the very tropes it indulges by finding new gears in old plot engines. And with the addition of a smart flashback structure keeping its central murder mystery afloat, Darío Madrona and Carlos Montero's drama quickly proves addictive.

— Caroline Framke, Variety

Writing for Variety, Caroline Framke also comments on the series' use of tropes. She notes that being introduced to the show as a combination of many other teen dramas, she was concerned that taking on so many tropes would make it "an overstuffed Frankenstein of a show", but that she was quickly proven wrong when watching it.

Framke compares many of the characters' individual plots to other high school series and films. Of these, she finds the "love triangle between Marina, Samuel, and his brother Nano [to be] one of the show's only duller features". She concludes by saying that "Even given a million other options on Netflix alone, this tantalizing and whipsmart entry to the teen show pantheon proves itself worthy of the spotlight." David Griffin of IGN also identifies the series in the same way. He gave the first season an 8.8/10, highlighting that it sets a "new standard for how a high school drama series should be done" and "may be the best high school drama on TV".

In a similar take, Lena Finkel of Femestella looked at how the series was different to many of its counterparts by how it tackled contentious issues. Finkel lists explicitly examples, including that when Elite has sex scenes, they are often about the woman's pleasure; that a character who believes abortion is murder is still pro-choice; that when a male character is come onto by a drunk girl that he likes, he sends her home; that it explores social and class differences when young people come out; that the gay male sex scene is sensual as well as explicit; and that it features characters including a young man unashamedly nervous to lose his virginity and a straight, white, wealthy, woman who is HIV-positive. She writes that the series "absolutely lives up to the height", congratulating it both on including these features and for "a great job depicting each issue, no matter how complex". However, she does note that the trailers "made it seem like yet another cheesy, over-acted teen drama".

Also looking at how the series addresses diverse issues and modern society, Grazia Middle East wrote about the representation of Nadia. Writer Olivia Adams says that the show explores some of the more everyday struggles of racial discrimination towards Muslims by having Nadia be forced to remove her headscarf in school, something that has been considered at some real schools in Europe. She also notes how the home life of the Muslim family is explored, not just the teenagers' interrelations, giving a fuller view.

Genevieve van Voorhis of Bustle notes that the series can feel aesthetically more like a horror than a teen drama as it pairs "wide shots of the school [that] are almost Wes Anderson-like in their color coordination and perfect 90 degree angles" with eerie music.

Kathryn VanArendonk of Vulture stated in a positive review of the series that though "Elite is not pushing new boundaries in television, it's not a self-serious reboot of an old property" and that "in spite of that—or more likely because of it!—its commitment to breakneck melodrama is undeniably enjoyable." Kemi Alemoru of Dazed recommends watching the show because it is "extra", relishing in showing the excessive world of the elite students with extravagant parties and the means to escalate small fights to high-expense drama, and also for its positive representation of topics. Kayla Kumari Upadhyaya from Thrillist recommended the first season in their review of the series by stating that "Elite might be the only show that could give Riverdale a run for its money when it comes to excessive slow-motion shots." Decider's Joel Keller also compares the show to Riverdale, saying that it is "trashy and scandalous, but no moreso than anything you might see coming from American producers" and the latest of the "dark high school dramas" that became popular; Keller recommends to stream it.

On Rotten Tomatoes, the second season has an approval rating of 92% based on reviews from 12 reviews, with an average rating of 6.00/10. The website's critical consensus reads, "Elite is back for another entertaining, edge-of-your-seat mystery that succeeds thanks to charismatic characters and a bloody plot that doesn't take itself too seriously."

Framke also notes that Netflix in the United States (Note: Netflix in the United Kingdom automatically defaults to the original language with American English subtitles (Netflix does not produce British English subtitles).) automatically defaults to the show with an English dub, and suggests changing the audio back to its original European Spanish for the best experience.

On Rotten Tomatoes, the third season has an approval rating of 100% based on reviews from 10 critics, with an average rating of 7.40/10.

On Rotten Tomatoes, the fourth season has three critic reviews. The three reviews are all "Fresh".

On Rotten Tomatoes, the fifth season has an overall rating of 80% based on reviews from 5 critics, with an average rating of 5.60/10.

On Rotten Tomatoes, the sixth season has an overall rating of 0% based on reviews from 5 critics, with an average rating of 3.25/10.

On Rotten Tomatoes, the seventh season has three critic reviews. Two out of the three reviews are "Fresh".

=== Popular response ===
On 17 January 2019, Netflix announced that the series (the first season) had been streamed by over 20 million accounts within its first month of release. The series is the second most followed Spanish-language TV show on TV Time's top 50 most followed shows ever, ranking at number 25 globally.

After Netflix posted an image of gay characters Omar and Ander to Instagram, it received homophobic comments. The streaming service responded to one with rainbow emojis.

=== Accolades ===
Year	Award	Category	Nominee(s)	Result	Ref.
2019	Feroz Awards	Best Drama Series	Elite	Nominated	
2019	GLAAD Media Awards	Outstanding Scripted Television Series (Spanish-Language)	Elite	Won	
2020	GLAAD Media Awards	Outstanding Scripted Television Series (Spanish-Language)	Elite	Nominated	
2021	GLAAD Media Awards	Outstanding Scripted Television Series (Spanish-Language)	Elite	Nominated	
2021	71st Fotogramas de Plata	Best Television Actor	Arón Piper	Nominated	
2022	Contigo! Awards	Best Actor – Series	André Lamoglia	Won	
