= Ricardo Curto =

Spanish composer of film scores

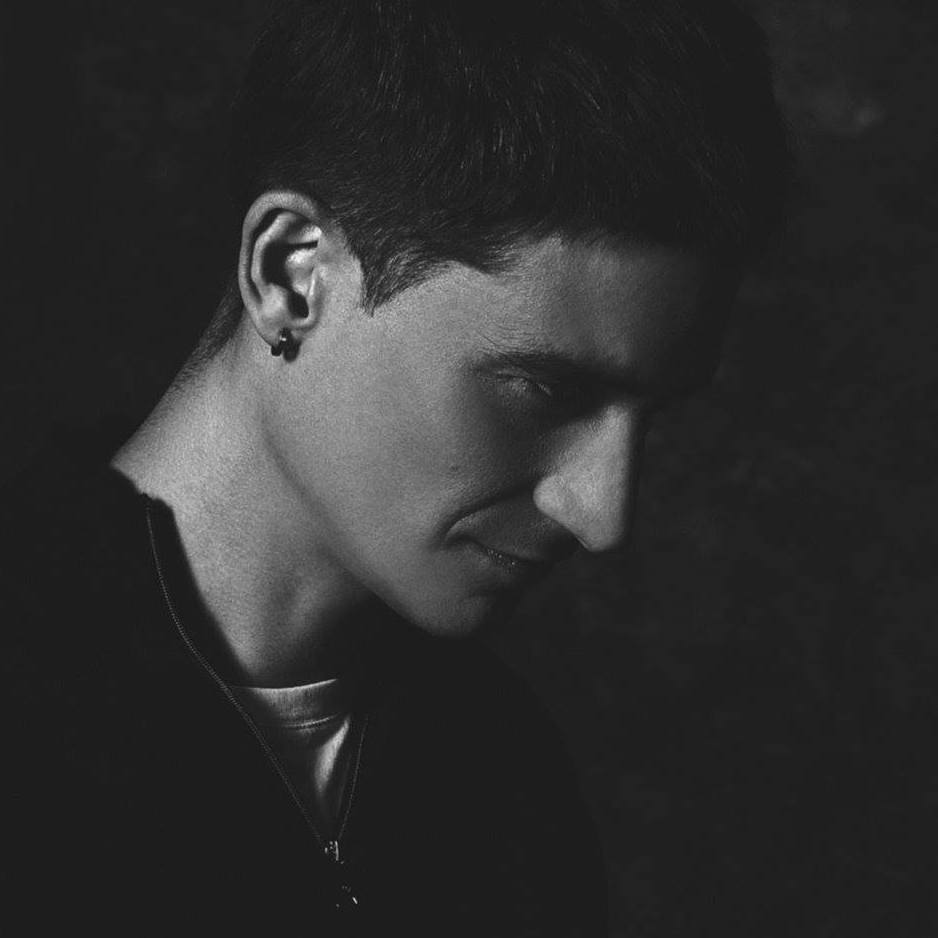
- Ricardo Curto
- Born: Spain
- Education: Berklee College of Music (Boston); Berklee College of Music (Valencia Campus)
- Occupation: Composer
- Years active: 2010–present
- Notable work: Élite; The Mess You Leave Behind; Ana Tramel El Juego
- Awards: Two-time Hollywood Music in Media Award nominee
- Website: ricardocurto.com

Ricardo Curto is a Spanish composer who creates film scores. He composed the soundtracks for several popular Netflix series and is a two-time Hollywood Music in Media Award nominee.

== Early life ==
He started his career as a jazz pianist, performing in a jazz trio comprising piano, drums and double bass. He released his first solo album, Cada Día Como El Último, in 2010. The eight-track album featured six of Curto's original compositions along with renditions of the jazz standards Footprints and Caravan. Curto dedicated the album's opening and closing tracks to Esbjörn Svensson. Curto studied at Berklee College of Music in Boston and completed his master's degree at Berklee's Valencia campus. He began scoring films after finishing his master's degree at Berklee, Valencia.

== Career ==
Curto has composed music for other television series, including El Desorden Que Dejas on Netflix and RTVE's Ana Tramel El Juego.

Curto joined Netflix's Élite after working with Carlos Montero Castiñeira on Netflix's mini-series The Mess You Leave Behind. He joined Elite's production team at the start of season six. He worked alongside Lucio Godoy for season 6 and scored seasons 7 and 8 alone. Although the series' previous composers had established its musical themes, prior to Curto's arrival, the series' soundtrack featured a lot of songs with lyrics. However, by season six the show's producers wanted to give more prominence to the series' original compositions. Curto's Élite score combines acoustic instruments such as piano and strings with electric guitars, percussion, and a variety of synthesizers and electronic effects. He is particularly interested in creating soundscapes that evoke tension and atmosphere, using recurring motifs and innovative sound textures. Curto operates from his Sound Vanguard studio in Valencia. Curto received Hollywood Music in Media Award nominations in 2018 and 2020 for his work on the Spanish independent films Halcon Ciego and Zerø, respectively.

== Filmography ==
Year	Title	IMDb Rating	Type	Role	Notes
2022–2024	Elite	7.2	TV Series	Composer	24 episodes
2023	Searching for Nika	8.2	Film	Composer	
2021	Cuando Haces Pop	3.9	Short	Composer	
2021	Keeper of Peace: A Star Wars Collateral Story	N/A	Short	Composer	
2021	Ana Tramel. El juego	6.6	TV Series	Composer	6 episodes
2020	The Mess You Leave Behind	6.8	TV Series	Composer	8 episodes
2020	Zerø	5.4	Film	Composer	
2018	Halcón Ciego	5.7	Film	Composer	
2017	Vs. Santa	7.3	Short	Composer (music by)	
