= Combustion (disambiguation) =

Combustion is the process through which matter burns.

Combustion may also refer to:

- The burning of fuel to power a motor, as with an internal combustion engine or external combustion engine
- Spontaneous human combustion
- Combustion (album), 2005 album by Decoded Feedback
- Combustion (film), 2013 Spanish film
- "Combustion" (QI), a 2005 television episode
