= List of Elite episodes =

Elite (Spanish: Élite; stylized as E L I T Ǝ) is a Spanish thriller teen drama television series created by Carlos Montero and Darío Madrona for Netflix. The series is set in Las Encinas, a fictional elite secondary school, and revolves around the relationships between three working-class teenage students enrolled at the school through a scholarship program and their wealthy classmates. The series features an ensemble cast. Many of the cast previously featured in other Netflix works produced or distributed in Spain and Latin America.

The first season, consisting of eight episodes, was released on Netflix on 5 October 2018. It received positive reviews from critics and audiences, with many hailing the series as a "guilty pleasure", and praising its writing, acting and portrayal of mature themes. The second season was released on 6 September 2019. A third season was ordered in August 2019 and was released on 13 March 2020. In May 2020 and February 2021, Netflix renewed the series for a fourth and fifth season. The fourth season was released on 18 June 2021, and the fifth season on April 8, 2022. In October 2021, Netflix renewed the series for a sixth season. It was announced on October 25, 2022, that Netflix renewed the series for a seventh season, which premiered on October 20, 2023.

On 19 July 2023, Netflix renewed the series for an eighth and final season, which was released on 26 July 2024. During the course of the series, 64 episodes of Elite were released.

== Series overview ==
| Season | Episodes | Originally released |
|---|---|---|
| 1 | 8 | 5 October 2018 |
| 2 | 8 | 6 September 2019 |
| 3 | 8 | 13 March 2020 |
| 4 | 8 | 18 June 2021 |
| 5 | 8 | 8 April 2022 |
| 6 | 8 | 18 November 2022 |
| 7 | 8 | 20 October 2023 |
| 8 | 8 | 26 July 2024 |

== Episodes ==
=== Season 1 (2018) ===
| No. overall | No. in season | Title | English title | Directed by | Written by | Original release date |
|---|---|---|---|---|---|---|
| 1 | 1 | "Bienvenidos" | "Welcome" | Ramón Salazar | Carlos Montero and Darío Madrona | 5 October 2018 |
Three working-class students are transferred to an elite private school after their public school collapses due to building issues. Samuel is picked on by Guzmán Nunier Osuna, the son of owner of building company of his previous school as his sister, Marina develops a special liking towards him. Nadia is barred from wearing Hijab citing secularity. Christian is looked down upon by students due to his garrulous nature but he befriends Ander, principal's son whom he helps in getting drugs through Omar, Nadia's brother. Meanwhile, Nano, Samuel's brother, is released from prison at parole. At Las Encinas, Nadia catches Guzmán and Lu together in the showers. Samuel and Nadia are invited by Marina while Ander accompanies Christian to party. At Marina's coming-out party, Lu dares Guzmán to take Nadia's virginity. Ander drunkenly texts to meet an online hookup who turns out to be Omar, who leaves after seeing Ander. Carla seduces Christian as her boyfriend Polo watches while Samuel dances with Marina, who later in an argument with her parents states that she is HIV positive. In the present, Marina is revealed to have been murdered, and an investigation commences.
| 2 | 2 | "Deseo" | "Desire" | Dani de la Orden | Carlos Montero | 5 October 2018 |
Marina and Samuel work on a class project together. Guzmán, to Nadia's annoyance at first, does not stop pursuing her. Against her wishes, he attempts to introduce himself to her devoutly Muslim parents, with slight consequences. Nadia gradually lets her guard down with him. Meanwhile, when he becomes concerned about Ander after seeing him with Omar, Guzmán tells Ander's parents that he is doing drugs. Nano reveals to Samuel that he owes inmates from prison €40,000 after they trash their apartment and terrorise their mother. Nano asks Samuel to blackmail Marina's family for the money, but Samuel feels guilty. Carla and Polo continue their scheme with Christian, who remains oblivious and is under the impression Carla truly likes him but when Polo walks in on him and Carla, he leaves angered and frustrated. In the present, it is revealed that Marina was pregnant.
| 3 | 3 | "Sábado noche" | "Saturday Night" | Ramón Salazar | Darío Madrona | 5 October 2018 |
Nano, with the help of Christian, decides to use documents regarding the corruption of Marina's father in order to blackmail him and, in the process, get money to pay off his debts. At Samuel's party, Marina and Nano decide to go to her house where after having sex with Marina, Nano finds that documents have been removed. Although Samuel wanted to admit his feelings for Marina, he gets drunk and throws up on her, never getting the chance. Searching for his sister, Guzmán accompanies Nadia to the party, where she drinks drugged punch and gets high. As a result, she asks Guzmán to swim in his pool with her. Realising her state, he refuses and calls a cab to take her home. At school the next day, Lu sees Nadia and Guzmán being friendly. Jealous, she reveals to Nadia that Guzmán made a bet to take Nadia's virginity. Nadia confronts him. Meanwhile, Marina tells Samuel she is HIV positive after he admits his feelings to her. Carla and Polo have a threesome with Christian after seducing him. Ander attends Samuel's party, where he gets high with Omar, to Guzmán's anger, and they fight. Later, asking for more pills, Ander gets into trouble and his hand is broken in an ensuing struggle. Samuel tells Nano about Marina's condition, and he confronts her, well aware of Samuel's feelings for her, and asks her to stop toying with his brother. In future, Samuel blames Nano during interrogation for murder while Christian states that it can never be Nano. Nano confesses that he is father of Marina's child and blames Samuel for Marina's murder.
| 4 | 4 | "El amor es una droga" | "Love Is a Drug" | Ramón Salazar | Darío Madrona | 5 October 2018 |
To her annoyance, Lu realises that Nadia received the top score on a recent exam, putting Lu in second place overall due to a grading curve. To get the top score, Lu investigates and finds out that her teacher is planning to adopt, but is having a tough time doing so due to financial issues. Using her family influence, she bribes her teacher into giving her the top score on the exam. Meanwhile, Guzmán tries to earn Nadia's forgiveness by buying her gifts. She tells him he must act like a Muslim and beg forgiveness from her parents for trying to take her virginity and disrupting her honour. When Guzmán obliges, she forgives him. The students attend a charity event organised by Marina and Guzmán's parents. Marina invites Samuel, and they finally start a relationship. To his disbelief and anger, Guzmán sees his father doing drugs in the winery, leading to an argument at a family dinner. Samuel and Guzmán also see Omar and Ander making out in the winery. Each confronts his friend, and each friend reveals new information — Ander doesn't really like tennis, and Samuel learns that Omar is a drug dealer. Carla, Christian and Polo step out of the party. Nano is offered a deal — he must shoot someone in the leg, and he won't owe any more money. However, he doesn't, which gets him stabbed and puts him into even more debt than before. Marina finds him and helps him, promising to keep it a secret from Samuel.
| 5 | 5 | "Todos mienten" | "Everyone Lies" | Dani de la Orden | Carlos Montero | 5 October 2018 |
Polo offers to help Christian get a job modeling, through his mom's agency, so that he can earn money. Marina offers Nano a way to make fast money in order to pay his debt by stealing watches from Carla's father. Lu tries to get back in Guzmán's good graces. Omar and Ander have a disagreement, when Omar discovers that Ander told his friends about their relationship. Marina seduces Samuel, who is nervous because it's his first time going all the way. Nano steals the valuable watches from Carla's house, which alerts and concerns her father. Her father's own watch, containing confidential information, is among those taken. Polo fails to follow through with helping Christian become a model, because he is afraid he will lose Carla to him. Marina is conflicted about her relationships with Nano and Samuel. She takes drugs that lead to her passing out at school.
| 6 | 6 | "Todo va a salir bien" | "Everything Will Be Okay" | Dani de la Orden | Darío Madrona | 5 October 2018 |
Nano learns that one of his stolen watches is more valuable than he thought. Marina is caught with drugs at school, and turns in her dealer. The investigators reveal that Marina had been pregnant. Guzman and Nadia become closer. Nano and Marina plans to run away together. Omar's family finds out about his drug dealing and Nadia gets yelled at by her father for knowing about it. Nadia blames Marina for ruining her and her brother's life. Her scholarship goes to someone else. Lu gets suspended for bribing the teacher.
| 7 | 7 | "Todo estalla" | "Everything Explodes" | Ramón Salazar | Carlos Montero | 5 October 2018 |
Carla grows suspicious of Marina and her potential involvement in the disappearances of the watches. Omar's father hears shocking information about his son. Guzmán goes after Nano.
| 8 | 8 | "Assilah" | "Assilah" | Ramón Salazar | Carlos Montero and Darío Madrona | 5 October 2018 |
The circumstances surrounding Marina's death are revealed, and the police make an arrest. Polo has in fact murdered Marina inadvertently with the trophy she received after a heated argument about her involvement with Carla's Dad's watches. However, Carla consoles Polo and tells him what to reveal to the police to prevent himself from being suspicious to the police. After interrogations, the police arrest Nano. Samuel begs Christian to help him to which he denies and leaves to see Carla.

=== Season 2 (2019) ===
| No. overall | No. in season | Title | English title | Directed by | Written by | Original release date |
|---|---|---|---|---|---|---|
| 9 | 1 | "20 horas desaparecido" | "20 hours missing" | Ramón Salazar | Darío Madrona | 6 September 2019 |
A student goes missing. In flashback to three months earlier, Guzmán still grieves the loss of his sister while remaining hostile toward Samuel. Christian struggles with his secret about who killed Marina. Three new students arrive: Cayetana, a rich socialite who lives alone; Valerio, Lu's half-brother, who shares an incestuous relationship with her; and Rebeka, a nouveaux-riche girl, who says her family won the lottery. Nadia and Omar's father has a stroke. Christian leaves a party to confess the murderer to the police, when he's hit by a car. He survives but may never walk again. Carla's father offers to pay for his therapy. Carla suspects her father to be involved in Christian's accident, as does Samuel. In the present day it is shown that Samuel is the missing person.
| 10 | 2 | "34 horas desaparecido" | "34 hours missing" | Ramón Salazar | Carlos Montero | 6 September 2019 |
Seeking the truth about Marina's death, Samuel seduces Carla into revealing her involvement. Lu's new friend, social media guru Cayetana, hosts an impromptu party. Guzmán joins the party instead of going to his sister's memorial. Ander and Polo bring Guzmán home, where he passes out. They put Guzmán in bed and decide to share his bed as they had done as children. Ander and Polo get horny and jerk each other off. In the present, Carla tells Lu that Samuel is not missing but is dead.
| 11 | 3 | "36 horas desaparecido" | "36 hours missing" | Ramón Salazar | Breixo Corral | 6 September 2019 |
Polo and Ander have a heart-to-heart. It is revealed that Cayetana is in fact the daughter of the school's housekeeper and had come on a scholarship. Guzmán and Nadia rekindle their relationship. Omar tells his parents he wants to stop working at the grocery store, but this confession escalates into an argument that ends with Omar's father furiously kicking him out of their house. Polo reveals to Ander that he in fact killed Marina.
| 12 | 4 | "59 horas desaparecido" | "59 hours missing" | Sílvia Quer | Abril Zamora | 6 September 2019 |
Pressured by his friends, Polo is overwhelmed by guilt and he tries to commit suicide. Cayetana and Ander rescue him. While on a double date with his boyfriend Omar, Lu, and Guzmán, Ander doesn't find the courage to tell Guzmán about Marina's murderer. After a party, Guzmán has sex with Nadia at Rebeka's house. Samuel starts working for Rebeka's mum, who is actually a drug dealer. Rebeka admits that she likes Samuel, but doesn't act on it. Cayetana's secret is threatened to be revealed. Nano is released from jail, infuriating Guzmán.
| 13 | 5 | "63 horas desaparecido" | "63 hours missing" | Sílvia Quer | Jaime Vaca | 6 September 2019 |
Nano tries to convince Guzmán that he has nothing to do with Marina's death, though Samuel stops him from causing more trouble and the rest of the students just wonder what this means for them. Rebeka arranges a Halloween party at her house where she finds out Cayetana is the school cleaner's daughter and attempts to publicly tease her with this newfound discovery. At the party, Nano threatens Rebeka to stop involving Samuel in her family's drug dealing business. While searching for Samuel, Nano sees Samuel making out with Carla. Samuel walks in on Lu making out with her brother. Nano then attempts to attack Carla, though Samuel intervenes and saves her.
| 14 | 6 | "66 horas desaparecido" | "66 hours missing" | Sílvia Quer | Carlos C. Tomé | 6 September 2019 |
Lu blackmails Nadia to fail her exam or she will tell her parents about the relationship while she intimidates Samuel into staying quiet about her and Valerio. When Nadia tells Valerio, he tells her to not worry and rather blackmail her about the "Valerio thing", which she does. Lu suspects Samuel to have told Nadia and she gives him a death threat in the hallway. After the exam, Valerio then tells Nadia that he's in love with his sister, which disgusts her. Samuel finds out that Polo is responsible for Marina's death after noticing that he and Christian had changed shirts during the school party. Guzmán doesn't believe him and the two fight, resulting in Guzmán getting suspended for three days after Lu defends Samuel. In the future, Guzmán is interrogated about Samuel's disappearance. Carla warns Samuel he will be in the same state as Christian, if he gets further into the murder mystery.
| 15 | 7 | "84 horas desaparecido" | "84 hours missing" | Dani de la Orden | Abril Zamora | 6 September 2019 |
Cayetana and Lu work together to start a fundraiser. Valerio films Nadia and Guzmán having sex in the boy's locker room and sends it to Lu. During the fundraiser, Lu finds out about Cayetana's secret and tells the whole party, and later sends the sex video to the whole school to get revenge on Nadia. Carla tries to warn Samuel about her father. The scene ends with Samuel running away on his bike from a speeding vehicle.
| 16 | 8 | "0 horas desaparecido" | "0 hours missing" | Dani de la Orden | Breixo Corral | 6 September 2019 |
Lu and Valerio's father catches them in an explicit situation. It is revealed that Samuel did not disappear but was hiding in Guzmán's grandparents house to trap Carla into confessing about Marina's murderer; as a result of her confession, Polo is arrested. Guzmán breaks his friendship with Ander for hiding the fact about Polo. Nadia's parents forgive her for the incident with the video. Ander and Omar reconcile. After two weeks, Polo reappears at school to everyone's surprise and it is revealed that Cayetana is hiding the murder weapon in her closet.

=== Season 3 (2020) ===
| No. overall | No. in season | Title | English title | Directed by | Written by | Original release date |
|---|---|---|---|---|---|---|
| 17 | 1 | "Carla" | "Carla" | Jorge Torregrossa | Darío Madrona | 13 March 2020 |
Polo and Carla are ordered to appear in court so that their stories can be compared. Polo looks like he is about to confess to the murder, but Carla retracts her testimony against Polo under duress; her father threatened her mother with legal and financial ruin if she did not do so. The detective has no choice but to drop the charges against Polo, and he is allowed back at Las Encinas. Ander learns he has leukemia. Samuel's mother decides to join Nano in Morocco, leaving Samuel in need of a roommate. Nadia meets new student Malick, a Muslim boy from Senegal, who charms her parents with his values. Lu's father cuts her off financially after coming clean about her situation with Valerio. After Guzmán assaults Polo, the outraged Azucena threatens immediate expulsion on any student should they ever do this again. In the present, Polo is found dead on the dance floor of a nightclub with the students looking on. Carla takes a broken bottleneck, hides it in her purse, and tells the detective that she would never hurt Polo.
| 18 | 2 | "Samuel y Guzmán" | "Samuel and Guzmán" | Jorge Torregrossa | Jaime Vaca | 13 March 2020 |
Nadia and Lu compete for the same scholarship to Columbia University, and Nadia threatens to expose Lu's secret affair with Valerio if Lu does not withdraw from the scholarship. Lu reveals her new financial situation to Nadia, and they subsequently decide to compete fairly for the scholarship. Rebeka finds out about Ander's cancer diagnosis, and later Ander tells his mother and Omar. A new student, Yeray, returns after a few years away from the school. He is smitten by Carla because she stood up to his bullies a few years earlier. Samuel tries to get close with Carla, but Carla pushes him away after her father threatens to hurt Samuel. Guzmán pretends to forgive Polo in order to regain his trust, and once he does so, holds Polo hostage in his house and asks him to confess to Marina's murder in court. Samuel frees Polo when things get out of hand. Valerio goes to Rebeka's house to get more cocaine before moving in with Samuel. Rebeka reveals her feelings for Samuel, and they make out on his couch.
| 19 | 3 | "Cayetana y Valerio" | "Cayetana and Valerio" | Dani de la Orden | Almudena Ocaña | 13 March 2020 |
The inspector gives Samuel a deal: plant a bug in Rebeka's house to gather evidence against her mother's drug business, in return for letting his brother return harm free. Samuel follows through. Polo continues to be harassed at school, as Samuel and Guzmán start posting tweets as Polo from a fake Twitter account about Marina's murder. When Nadia's parents oppose her plans to study at Columbia, Malick supports her and says he will be studying there too. Yeray takes Carla out, and later invites her father to his IPO celebration party. Carla's father forces her to attend because he needs to convince Yeray to invest in his company, as they are close to bankruptcy. Ander is actively pushing Omar away and threatens to stop taking chemo, but after a heart-to-heart with Guzmán, who now knows about his diagnosis, Ander decides to continue with treatment. Polo's mothers decide that they should send Polo to a boarding school abroad, but another fake Twitter account forwards all of the tweets to every boarding school under consideration, giving Polo no choice but to stay at Las Encinas. Cayetana is revealed as the person behind the fake account that sent the tweets to the boarding schools.
| 20 | 4 | "Lu" | "Lu" | Dani de la Orden | Carlos C. Tomé | 13 March 2020 |
When Nadia fails a report, Guzmán goes to the shop and makes a deal with her father: he will work at the store so that Nadia can spend more time studying. When her mother is arrested, Rebeka falls short on money and moves in with Samuel. Acuzena tells Rebeka that due to the charges against her mother, she will either be expelled or can leave "voluntarily" to save her academic record. Rebeka refuses to leave, pointing out the double standard with Polo. Samuel overhears the conversation and threatens to drop out of school if Rebeka is kicked out, and the rest of the class follows suit. Rebeka gets to stay at Las Encinas, but she has to sell drugs to pay her tuition. Due to her lack of funds, Lu throws an "upside down" themed Valentine's Day party. Malick kisses Omar, and they later hookup at Lu's party. Guzmán tells Nadia that he loves her; she says the feeling is mutual but chooses Malick because he makes her family happy. Malick takes Nadia's family to dinner, including Omar, but Omar and his father fight about Ander, causing Omar to leave. Ander continues to struggle with chemo. Polo, Cayetana, and Valerio engage in a threesome. After Valerio reveals Lu's financial status to Polo, he uses this information to blackmail her by threatening to have her scholarship cancelled by his mothers if she doesn't leave him and Cayetana alone. In the present, Lu tells the cops she knows who killed Polo.
| 21 | 5 | "Ander" | "Ander" | Jorge Torregrossa | Almudena Ocaña | 13 March 2020 |
Rebeka and Valerio start selling drugs at Las Encinas. Polo, Cayetana, and Valerio decide to go to London together. Ander starts to lose his hair due to chemo, so he shaves his head and reveals the diagnosis to his classmates. Rebeka's mother tells her that she is in jail because someone planted a bug in their house, and everyone involved in the drug operation went to jail except for Samuel. Rebeka becomes suspicious of him, prompting Samuel to rush to cover up his steps. Carla and Yeray continue their relationship, but Carla, unhappy, resorts to drugs. At a blackout party, Rebeka puts fluorescent paint on her bag to find out if Samuel placed the bug in her house. Samuel takes the bait and hands the bag to Omar, who proceeds to hook up with Malick again. When the fluorescent paint becomes visible, Rebeka not only confirms that Samuel is guilty, but Nadia also discovers that Malick is gay, was using her as a beard to hide his sexuality from his parents, and cheated on her with Omar. Lu encourages Nadia to use Malick so that she can go to Columbia if she wins the scholarship. In the present, Ander considers confessing, but is talked out of it by Omar.
| 22 | 6 | "Rebeka" | "Rebeka" | Jorge Torregrossa | Carlos C. Tomé and Andrés Seara | 13 March 2020 |
Nadia wins the scholarship, but backs out when Malick gives her an engagement ring to please their parents. However, she is talked back into it by Lu. Nadia decides to split the scholarship with Lu. Ander finds out about Omar's affair with Malick and breaks up with Omar, lying that he was cheating on him with Alexis. Samuel tells Valerio to not sell Carla drugs when he sees her state and kicks him out of the apartment. Polo breaks off his relationship with Valerio and Cayetana when he finds out Valerio made money for his school fees by selling drugs. Yeray throws a pool party where Rebeka sells Carla drugs out of spite and jealousy. Carla admits to Yeray that she takes drugs in order to cope with their arranged relationship; she later overdoses and collapses, prompting Polo to save her. At school, Polo fights with Valerio about giving Carla drugs, causing the principal to find their stash as Samuel starts beating Polo up.
| 23 | 7 | "Nadia y Omar" | "Nadia and Omar" | Dani de la Orden | Jaime Vaca | 13 March 2020 |
Valerio and Rebeka are expelled over their drugs, while Samuel and Guzmán are expelled when Polo's mother complains about bullying. Although Guzmán is ready to move on, Samuel can't bring himself to do so as well because of Polo, who feels guilty for their expulsion, let alone on the last day of school. Omar decides to go to New York with Nadia. Ander decides not to graduate. Rebeka's mother is released from jail, and Rebeka asks her to quit. Carla apologizes to Yeray about their relationship and they make amends. At graduation, Nadia and Lu refer to their friends being expelled and Polo's hand in Marina's death, causing their scholarships to be cancelled. Samuel finds out his deal with the police was a trap to find his brother's location and blames the Inspector for it. Yeray invests in the wineries, but makes Carla the owner. Polo convinces his mothers to go through with the scholarship and reveals to them that he indeed killed Marina. At the graduation party, Carla tries to make amends with Samuel, in time for Polo's arrival.
| 24 | 8 | "Polo" | "Polo" | Dani de la Orden | Darío Madrona | 13 March 2020 |
The interactions between Polo and the characters over the season play out. It is revealed that Lu accidentally stabbed Polo in the restroom with the bottleneck, and his subsequent delirium from the loss of blood caused him to fall to his death from the second level of the club onto the dance floor. Before Polo takes his final breath, Guzmán rushes to his side and tells him he forgives him. Everyone present covers for Lu by touching the bottleneck to put their fingerprints on it, then colluding to accuse each other so as to generate false leads. They also put Polo's fingerprints on the bottle, leading the authorities to rule his death a suicide. Nadia and Lu's scholarships are reinstated by Polo's mothers, and they leave for New York, along with Malick. Omar decides not to go to New York, reconciling with Ander, whose cancer is now in remission. Carla leaves the wineries to Valerio to manage so she can study abroad. Samuel, Guzmán, Rebeka, Ander, and Omar return to Las Encinas for their final year. Cayetana becomes the cleaning lady at the school, having finally come to terms with her humble roots.

=== Season 4 (2021) ===
| No. overall | No. in season | Title | English title | Directed by | Written by | Original release date |
|---|---|---|---|---|---|---|
| 25 | 1 | "El Nuevo Orden" | "The New Order" | Eduardo Chapero-Jackson | Jaime Vaca | 18 June 2021 |
Las Encinas finds a new principal in Benjamin Commerford, but Samuel and Omar soon learn they are to be retested if they want to stay. Meanwhile, Benjamin's children cause problems: Patrick flirts with Ander and offers to help Omar in exchange, Mencía sets her eyes on Rebe but later finds herself cut off financially and Ari discovers Guzmán is using her to try and convince her father not to test the scholarship students. To make money, Mencía begins a sexual relationship with Armando, a wealthy businessman. In the end, Omar and Samuel pass the test and, in a flashforward, Ari is discovered near death in a pool.
| 26 | 2 | "5 segundos" | "Five Seconds" | Eduardo Chapero-Jackson | Esther Morales and Jaime Vaca | 18 June 2021 |
The students prepare for the arrival of new classmate Prince Phillipe, but become angered by all the security precautions. After security clears all the male students out of the showers so Phillipe can shower alone, Samuel throws a “towel party” where everyone dresses in a towel in an act of rebellion. Mencía tries to convince Rebecka to accept her advances. Guzmán and Nadia struggle with long distance agreeing to take a week's break to reflect on their relationship. Omar and Ander invite Patrick to join them in a threesome. Ari and Samu sleep together, which Guzmán witnesses. Cayetana flirts with Phillipe, who later secretly records them having sex in the bedroom. In a flashforward, Ari flatlines.
| 27 | 3 | "Cuando bailan las mentiras con las tentaciones" | "When Lies Dance with Temptation" | Ginesta Guindal | David Lorenzo and Jaime Vaca | 18 June 2021 |
Guzmán and Nadia peacefully agree to break up. Phillipe hosts a debutante ball and invites the school. While getting ready in Phillipe's room, Cayetana discovers the camera that was secretly recording their sexual activities. She later finds a computer containing several files of Phillipe having sex with other women, including her. Guzmán asks Ari to be his date for the ball. Omar grows frustrated with Ander over his obsession with Patrick. Guzmán notices Ari and Samuel exchanging glances throughout the night. Cayetana confronts Phillipe about the videos, and he explains it is recorded as evidence in case of any sexual assault claims, which he has gotten in the past. Omar angrily confronts Patrick about their threesome, but the confrontation turns into aggressive bareback sex. In a flashforward, Ari wakes up in the hospital.
| 28 | 4 | "Soy una..." | "I'm a..." | Ginesta Guindal | Almudena Ocaña | 18 June 2021 |
In a flashforward, Ari wakes up with memory loss. Benjamin convinces Samuel to join the debate club. Rebecka discovers a hotel key in Mencía's backpack. Phillipe attempts to apologize to Cayetana, who says she does not want a relationship that is not built on trust. After unsuccessfully igniting another threesome between Ander and Omar, Patrick overdoses on GHB. Omar takes Patrick and Ander back to his house; while Ander passes out on top of his bed, Omar is left to babysit Patrick during his withdrawal on the couch, where Ander discovers them asleep together the next morning. Benjamin discovers and confiscates Mencía's pile of cash. Phillipe reconciles with Cayetana at the Lake Club. Mencía takes on another client (recommended by Armando) who is sexually aggressive. Benjamin believes she is missing and sends Rebecka, Ari, Patrick, and Samuel to search for her. Rebecka, who deduces Mencía's location from the hotel key, saves her from the client. Guzmán witnesses Ari and Samuel hanging out together. Patrick tells Ander that he and Omar had sex at the debutante ball. In a flashforward, Samuel gets arrested when he tries to visit Ari.
| 29 | 5 | "La reinserción" | "Reinsertion" | Eduardo Chapero-Jackson | Almudena Ocaña | 18 June 2021 |
Ander confronts Omar about hooking up with Patrick. Ari suspects that Phillipe was with Mencía the night she went "missing" because she reappeared at home with bruises, implying that she knows about Phillipe's rumored sexual assault allegations. Ari later warns Cayetana about Phillipe, but when Cayetana searches online about Phillipe's assault allegations, she finds nothing. Ander breaks up with Omar, who becomes extremely heartbroken. Armando apologizes to Mencía about the aggressive client, and she accepts the apology. Rebe's mother witnesses Mencía get into Armando's car, which she records and shows to Rebe. Ander goes to collect his belongings in Omar's house only to find that Omar already packed them and sent them to Ander's mother Azucena. Rebecka confronts Mencía about the video, and in retaliation Mencía tells Rebecka that her mother has begun dealing drugs again. Rebecka escapes from her house after hearing this.
| 30 | 6 | "Te quiero mal" | "I Love You All Wrong" | Eduardo Chapero-Jackson | David Lorenzo | 18 June 2021 |
Ari tells her father to no longer invite Samuel to their house as she wants to separate her personal and private life. Omar stops attending school, worrying about seeing Ander and Patrick together, which Samuel also disapproves of. Rebecka worries about Mencía returning to prostitution after witnessing a heated argument between her and Armando. Guzmán criticizes the way Benjamin treats his children, putting him at odds with Ari, who has officially become his girlfriend. At an Ambar Lucid concert, which Cayetana refuses to attend as she has trouble trusting Phillipe, Patrick is upset after seeing Ander kissing someone else and accidentally busts Ari's lip in anger. After the party finishes and Samuel is cleaning, Ari returns to kiss him and they have sex.
| 31 | 7 | "Antes de irme (1a parte)" | "Before I Go (Part I)" | Ginesta Guindal | Esther Morales and Jaime Vaca | 18 June 2021 |
Ari and Samuel have started secretly sleeping together, but both feel guilty about it. Omar, sensing that Patrick is still upset about Ander's antics, decides to cheer him up, resulting in the two of them kissing. Ander is unhappy but Omar reminds him that he doesn't want to be with either of them, so can't dictate who they choose to date. Rebecka comes face to face with Mencía as she is about to go into a hotel room with Armando, unaware he is blackmailing her into sleeping with him. Cayetana attends an event that Phillipe invited her to, but when she gets the opportunity to meet her dream designer and realises he wants to sleep with her before seeing her sketches, she turns him down, earning Ari's respect. Patrick visits Ander and purposely “butt-dials” Omar, hoping to cause a final rift between the two ex-boyfriends, but instead causes Ander to reveal he still loves Omar, with him listening to the entire conversation. Cayetana and Phillipe have drinks in his limo, but after realising the rumors about him were true, she escapes when he nearly rapes her, leaving Phillipe in a panic. Finally, Ari has dinner with both Samuel and Guzmán and admits she loves them both and doesn't want to give either of them up.
| 32 | 8 | "Antes de irme (2a parte)" | "Before I Go (Part II)' | Ginesta Guindal | Jaime Vaca | 18 June 2021 |
Guzmán refuses to forgive Samuel and Ari. Rebecka decides to tell Ari about the mess Mencía is in with Armando, knowing she is risking their relationship by doing so. After learning that Ander has decided to leave Las Encinas halfway through the school year, Omar admits that he still loves him and they get back together, angering Patrick. Being confronted by Phillipe's mother at the New Year's party, Cayetana tells her that she is the one to blame for the way her son acts, not his "biological urges." This leads to Phillipe calling the girl he previously abused, admitting to his actions and telling her he hopes she accepts his confession. Omar tells Ander that if he wants to leave then he should, he'll be waiting for him when he returns. Rebe spots Armando getting physical with Mencía on the dock and defuses the situation; Ari then confronts Armando alone and threatens to call her father, leading him to attack her. Samu gets beaten up by Guzmán during the party until Guzmán notices a text message from Ari. Guzmán chases after Armando and in a fit of rage, grabs a flare gun and shoots him dead. In the hospital, with Ari fully conscious, Guzmán tells her he knows she loves Samuel and gives them his blessing. Choosing to leave, Guzmán and Ander say a tearful goodbye to their friends and loves ones. Mencía asks Ari to be by her side when she tells Benjamín and Patrick about her relationship with Armando. In a flashback, it is revealed that Guzmán was helped by Rebecka and Samuel, who threw Armando's dead body into the lake.

=== Season 5 (2022) ===
| No. overall | No. in season | Title | English title | Directed by | Written by | Original release date |
|---|---|---|---|---|---|---|
| 33 | 1 | "Yo lo maté" | "I Killed Him" | Dani de la Orden | Jaime Vaca | 8 April 2022 |
At a party, a video is projected of Phillipe's victim playing his voicemail confession and condemning him. Back at school, Benjamin implements strict rules while Phillipe faces scrutiny and threats from classmates. Patrick sets his sights on new student Iván, who claims to be heterosexual, while Mencía avoids Rebe to try and stay in Benjamin's good graces. Samu finally visits Ari who forgives him for not seeing her in the hospital, and the two become a couple before Ari returns to school. New student Isadora pressures Caye while Omar struggles without Ander. The police investigate Armando's disappearance, unaware of his murder, and Mencía confesses her relationship with him. Caye releases a video encouraging Phillipe to stay at Las Encinas and redeem himself rather than flee the country. In a flash forward, the police question Samu who says, "I killed him."
| 34 | 2 | "Todo vale" | "Anything Goes" | Dani de la Orden and Ginesta Guindal | David Lorenzo | 8 April 2022 |
The students are enraged when Benjamin begins tracking them through their student apps, and Patrick decides to throw a party in rebellion where "anything goes" and everyone is free to experiment. Caye takes Phillipe to counseling where the counselor convinces him to stop drinking, but Isadora gets into his head. Ari begins acting rebelliously, and after catching her and Samu being intimate at school, Benjamin asks Samu to start controlling her. Omar hires a young homeless man, Bilal, at the restaurant, but catches him trying to steal money. Rebe gives Mencía a final chance to win her back by coming to the party. When Mencía does not show, Rebe kisses Iván, much to Patrick's dismay. Samu gives in and starts doing what Ari wants only to be seen by Benjamin when he tracks the students to the party. In a flash forward, Samu drags a body along a beach, while in another the police ask Rebe what she knows.
| 35 | 3 | "Átame" | "Tie Me Up" | Lino Escalera | Jessica Pires and Lluís Mosquera | 8 April 2022 |
The day after the party, Benjamin gives the students a drug test and threatens expulsion to anyone who tests positive. When they refuse, he announces they will all vote to expel one student on everyone else's behalf. Samu and Omar continue bickering while Omar invites Bilal to stay with them after learning he is being threatened by gangsters. Iván gets Patrick tickets to a drive-in film festival to apologize but invites everyone as a friendly outing. He later kisses Ari while they get ready and she tells him to stay away from her and Patrick. Mencía invites Rebe, who tries to keep things friendly, but the two end up hooking up. However, Rebe breaks things off when Mencía is still unable to commit. Isadora continues to bully Caye while encouraging Phillipe's poor habits. Iván tells Patrick they need distance because Patrick keeps getting hurt. Knowing Benjamin will not actually expel him, Omar casts his tie-breaking vote for Samu. Samu is expelled for three days and angrily kicks Omar out of his house. In a flash forward, Ari asks Samu why he did it and if her father drove him crazy.
| 36 | 4 | "El cuerpo" | "The Body" | Lino Escalera | Jaime Vaca | 8 April 2022 |
In a flashback, Armando threatens Benjamin. At a school fundraiser at the restaurant, Benjamin convinces Samu to quit his job after Omar continues hounding him. Omar and Bilal discover Armando's body in the lake after it floats to the top. A drunk Ari, feeling neglected by Samu, hooks up with Iván, unaware that Patrick witnesses it. After being drugged by Isadora, Phillipe tells Caye they should go separate ways. Patrick turns to Iván's father, Cruz, after an argument with Benjamin, and the two kiss. Rebe's new fling, Jess, threatens Mencía. Unable to drag Armando back into the lake, Samu and Rebe call the police after Omar insists. Mencía discovers a SIM card in the case of the phone Armando gave her and finds that its last call was to a secret second phone of Benjamin's. In a flash forward, Samu floats injured in a pool.
| 37 | 5 | "Por favor, di la verdad" | "Please, Tell the Truth" | Ginesta Guindal | Almudena Ocaña and Jaime Vaca | 8 April 2022 |
The police launch an investigation. Ari and Cruz tell Iván and Patrick respectively to leave them be, leading Iván and Patrick to rekindle their friendship. The police confiscate Benjamin's phone, which he claims is his only one, before Benjamin gives Mencía his second one to hide. However, the lieutenant witnesses this on a school security camera. Caye bumps into Fillipe and Phillipe makes them eat dinner with him and Isadora. Iván admits he is attracted to Patrick but does not want to hurt him. He eventually gives in and the two have sex. Caye brings a drunk Isadora home and confronts her about her drug addiction. The lieutenant finds Benjamin's second phone, but as he questions Mencía, Samu confesses to the murder under Benjamin's promise that he will get him the best lawyers and he will be set financially for life. Samu is arrested and Mencía overhears Rebe and Omar talk about their involvement with Armando's death.
| 38 | 6 | "No puedes comprar mi amor" | "Can't Buy My Love" | Ginesta Guindal | David Lorenzo and Jaime Vaca | 8 April 2022 |
Benjamin and his attorney tell Samu to retract his confession and claim insanity. Benjamin claims it would be suspicious if he bailed Samu out; Ari, Patrick, Mencía and Phillipe's accounts are frozen in order to prevent them from withdrawing the funds. Mencía gives Benjamin the SIM card but holds on to a copy she made. Isadora tries to quit drugs. Iván offers to give Ari the bail money before telling his father about his feelings for Patrick and Ari; Cruz reacts poorly and belittles him. Iván throws a date auction party to raise funds, but Cruz outbids Iván for Patrick so that Iván wins Ari. Ari and Iván spend one last night together while Patrick tells Cruz he is done chasing Iván. Iván later witnesses Patrick and Cruz kiss. Rebe wins a date with Mencía and promises to claim her prize soon. Samu is released and heartbroken to learn Benjamin was not the one to bail him out. A flash forward shows Mencía and Ari finding a blood-stained Patrick chasing after a weakened Samu.
| 39 | 7 | "Tóxicos" | "Toxic" | Eduardo Chapero-Jackson | Jessica Pires, Lluís Mosquera and Jaime Vaca | 8 April 2022 |
The police recruit Samu to find evidence to implicate Benjamin, leading Samu to forgive Ari so he can search for the SIM card at Benjamin's house while Rebe asks Cayetana to search Benjamin's office. Iván confronts Cruz and tells Patrick to stay out of their lives. Phillipe starts to ghost Isadora before condemning her for her drug addiction. Wanting to get away, Iván and Isadora travel with three students to Ibiza, but Phillipe follows them. Samu and Rebe are invited to Benjamin's for dinner, but a heartbroken Mencía finds Rebe looking for the SIM card before giving it to her. Benjamin is notified that Cayetana was caught in his office. A drunk and high Iván accidentally sends a voice memo confessing his feelings for Patrick to Ari while Patrick and Cruz hook up again. Isadora falls unconscious while partying in her suite and the three students start filming and undressing her.
| 40 | 8 | "Tu lado del mundo y el mío" | "Your Side of the World and Mine" | Eduardo Chapero-Jackson | Jessica Pires and Jaime Vaca | 8 April 2022 |
Ari asks Samu not to release the SIM card but promises she'll accept whatever he chooses. Back at school, Phillipe and Iván try to recount what happened in Ibiza. Ari plays Patrick Iván's voice memo but Patrick doesn't believe Iván meant to say his name. Cayetana is fired for sneaking into Benjamin's office and tries to offer support to Isadora before returning to Fillipe. Samu agrees to talk to Benjamin before seeing the police. Iván and Phillipe find out from the three students' video that they had tried to stop Isadora's assault but fell unconscious themselves. Phillipe later convinces Isadora to report her assault to the cops. Benjamin tries to take the card from Samu, causing Samu to slip near the pool and crack his head open. Cruz and Iván make up and Iván plans to confess his love for Patrick, but Iván finds Patrick has left the restaurant. Patrick returns home but Benjamin stops him from calling the police. He instead calls Mencía, Rebe, Omar and Ari who all turn on Benjamin. The police arrive and arrest Benjamin while Iván comforts Patrick and Rebe and Omar watch in horror.

=== Season 6 (2022) ===
| No. overall | No. in season | Title | English title | Directed by | Written by | Original release date |
|---|---|---|---|---|---|---|
| 41 | 1 | "Ansiedad" | Anxiety | Lino Escalera | Jaime Vaca | 18 November 2022 |
The Blanco siblings try to not let their family baggage weigh them down as they are forced to repeat a year at Las Encinas. Isadora has a big night at her new club, House of Isadora, while trying to keep her mind off the impending trial. Ivan and Patrick start having problems after Patrick starts having doubts. Sara, an influencer, Nico, a transgender boy, Dídac, a servant at House of Isadora who has a secret past, and Rocio, a hippie tattoo artist, enroll to Las Encinas for the new school year.
| 42 | 2 | "Selfis" | Selfies | Lino Escalera | Jaime Vaca | 18 November 2022 |
Isa becomes the target to internet trolls as her rapists are acquitted. Ari tries to start fresh with Nico. Patrick and Ivan are faced with another challenge as Patrick takes the fall for kissing Cruz, who later on comes out as gay during a press conference. Dídac secretly records Javier, who is his best friend, confessing to his part in Isadora's rape and apologizes to her. Feeling bad for Isadora, Sara contradicts her previous opinion about her, but at the cost of losing 1.5 million of their followers. Infuriated, her boyfriend Raúl hits her.
| 43 | 3 | "Desnudos" | Naked | Kike Maíllo | Carlos Montero, Lluís Mosquera and Jaime Vaca | 18 November 2022 |
Isa's friends old and new rally around her as the trourmenters both online and in school get worst, and decide to have a strip party. Mencia starts to worry about Sara and Raul's relationship. Cruz deals with fallout after his coming out.
| 44 | 4 | "Guerra" | War | Kike Maíllo | Jessica Pires | 18 November 2022 |
Ivan and his friends show up for Cruz's championship game, which ends in a violent riot. Shortly after that, Cruz is brutally murdered by three homophobic men. Sara leaves Raúl and finds shelter at the house of the Blanco siblings. Ari's drinking problem worsens.
| 45 | 5 | "Duelo" | Mourning | Elena Trapé | Jessica Pires | 18 November 2022 |
Ivan and Patrick's relationship is on thin ice as Ivan has trouble coping with Cruz's death. Pressured by Hugo and Alex, Javi lies to Isadora about what really went down in Ibiza; that Iván was the one who coerced them all to rape her, causing Isadora to start avoiding him and miss his father's funeral. Pau, Dídac's brother, moves to Madrid. After a conversation with Dídac, Javi tells the truth to Isadora and she promises Iván to never abandon him. Raúl isn't ready to let Sara.goals go, and tries anything to get Sara back. Mencía tries to talk some sense into Sara, but she accuses her of being the controlling one and shuts her out. Patrick catches Ari and Iván hooking up and angrily calls both of them out, but Iván blames Patrick for his father's death and breaks up with him.
| 46 | 6 | "Tina" | Tina | Elena Trapé | Carlos Montero | 18 November 2022 |
Ivan heads on a downward spiral and seeks a emotional release. Patrick tries to move on, but finds it hard to do so. Sara falls back on old habits. Ari tries to seek closure. Isa proposes a plan to get revenge on Alex and Hugo, Nico is concerned. Benjamin announces that his trial has been scheduled and asks Ari, Patrick and Mencía to testify on his behalf. While Ari agrees, Patrick and Mencía outright refuse to do so, having seen that Ari is still defending him even after Samuel's death. After some time, Ari ultimately reneges on the offer and finally has the courage to visit Samuel's grave for the first time in four months.
| 47 | 7 | "Máscaras" | Masks | Lino Escalera | Lluís Mosquera and Jaime Vaca | 18 November 2022 |
A Venetian carnival night at House of Isadora brings out a new side of Didac as Isadora's mother meets his brother. As his family wants to expand their business in Madrid, Isadora's mother is completely against it and fires Dídac. The students face another tragedy as Ivan suffers a serious accident.
| 48 | 8 | "Separación" | Separation | Lino Escalera | Jaime Vaca | 18 November 2022 |
Reeling from the events of the night before, Ari takes desperate measures to protect her family and makes some difficult decisions. Isadora and Didac try to push their family drama aside in order to grow closer as something more than friends. Hugo and Alex's past actions finally catch up to them in the most ironic way possible.

=== Season 7 (2023) ===
| No. overall | No. in season | Title | English title | Directed by | Written by | Original release date |
|---|---|---|---|---|---|---|
| 49 | 1 | "Las Encinas" | Las Encinas | Lino Escalera | Jaime Vaca | 20 October 2023 |
The recent attempted shooting has sparked an uproar at Las Encinas, and most parents and students demand Dídac's expulsion because his family is suspected. Omar reluctantly returns to Las Encinas to start an internship with a self-help app despite going through a depression over Samuel's death. Iván recovers from his injuries and his friends throw him a party. Sara's guilt at causing Iván's accident starts eating her alive, but Raúl bullies her into staying quiet. Iván meets and falls for Joel, a delivery boy, although he is in a relationship with Omar. He enrolls at the school and Iván pays his tuition. Two new students also arrive at the school: Eric, Nico's self-destructive cousin who stays at his house indefinitely, and promiscuous Chloe, who has a strained relationship with her eccentric mother Carmen, later revealed to be Iván's biological mother. The head of studies, Luis, turns out to be an undercover cop investigating Isadora and Dídac. Isadora and Nico's mothers decide to allow Dídac to stay.
| 50 | 2 | "Protocolo" | Protocol | Lino Escalera | Alberto Manzano | 20 October 2023 |
Omar quits therapy and struggles to get back on his feet while grappling with the idea of Joel studying at Las Encinas. He tries to quit the internship as the students keep using the app for trolling, but a cry of help changes his mind. It turns out that Roberta was the one behind the school shooting and tried to put the blame on Dídac, as Pau had blackmailed her into reversing her decision. During a horse racing event, someone poisons Roberta's mare, and she is quick to point fingers at Pau. Chloe meets Iván and tries to have sex with him, but Carmen stops her, revealing that he is her brother. Jessica, Sara's P.E. teacher, becomes concerned and suspects her abusive relationship, but Sara denies it. Joel tells Iván that he and Omar met while both of them were at their lowest, to which he tells him about Samuel and how his death took a toll on Omar. To keep Iván from the truth, Sara manipulates him into selling his house and moving in with her and Raúl, especially to help them pay the rent now that they're broke.
| 51 | 3 | "Bling-Bling" | Bling-Bling | Menna Fité | Jessica Pires | 20 October 2023 |
Sara throws a glitter party for her birthday. Isadora publicly breaks up with Dídac due to the war between their families. However, she and Dídac keep dating secretly. Luis steals Dídac's phone and sets up a wiretapping to listen to their conversations. Sonia offers to help Omar with the self-help app. Eric wants to get to know Chloe better, but she rejects him. Carmen meets with Iván and manages to help him let go of Patrick. Catalina, Rocío's mother who is a judge orders the eviction of a social centre. Eric, Rocío and Nico go to a protest there to prevent this, but the riot intensifies when the police start violently attacking the people. Nico manages to escape while Rocío is arrested and Eric cowardly leaves her behind. Sonia catches Nico and Chloe having sex. Omar sees a picture of Joel and Iván together and becomes paranoid. Jessica announces that she is giving self-defence classes. Raúl proposes to Sara during a livestream.
| 52 | 4 | "Punto y coma" | Semicolon | Menna Fité | Guillermo J. Escribano | 20 October 2023 |
At a Pan-African gathering, exchange student Fikile Bhele (Note: One of the main characters from Blood & Water.) visits the school and befriends the group. As they watch a football match, Iván is triggered by memories of his father, so Fiks suggests he apply for the exchange program in South Africa to start fresh. Chloe tells Carmen to leave Iván alone as to spare him any pain, as Carmen was only interested in his father's money. Still suspicious about their friendship, Omar finds out that Iván paid for Joel's tuition. Eric has a disastrous sexual encounter with Chloe after he inadvertenly insults her and starts hitting himself. Isadora's father, Martín, arrives at the club, where Dídac finds out that he is bribing Catalina to push the social centre eviction. After Dídac informs Isadora about Catalina's corruption, she goes to confront her father, but their conversation is interrupted by police raiding the place and arresting some drug dealers. Joel visits Iván and they sleep together.
| 53 | 5 | "La familia" | The Family | Roger Gual | Lluís Mosquera and Jaime Vaca | 20 October 2023 |
Omar returns home to find Joel and Iván having sex in his bed. Hurt and furious, he breaks up with Joel and kicks him out, but Iván comforts Omar and offers to leave Joel if that's what he wants. Sara is too scared to practice self-defence and abruptly leaves the class. After catching Raúl masturbating to a picture of Chloe, Sara comes up with the idea of using her infamous reputation under the guise of befriending and inviting her over. Chloe sees through the ruse and, despite being offended by Sara's intentions, she agrees to help her. Sara decides to return to the self-defence classes. Isadora's House gets closed down following the drug dealing incident. Isadora overhears Catalina informing her parents that the club will not reopen unless they make her the owner of the property. Carmen visits Iván to help him clear out Cruz's stuff. High on drugs, Carmen hallucinates Iván as Cruz and kisses him, almost leading to incestuous sex. Horrified, Carmen leaves in tears. Isadora decides to sign the contract papers and becomes the new owner of the club. Dídac asks her to negotiate with his family, but she refuses.
| 54 | 6 | "Tocar fondo" | At Rock Bottom | Roger Gual | Alberto Manzano and Jaime Vaca | 20 October 2023 |
Sara exposes Raúl as a cheater to the entire school, but she throws Chloe under the bus by using her scandalous sex habit to her advantage. Humiliated, Chloe has an impromptu girls' afternoon with Carmen. Iván shows up to ask Carmen why has she been avoiding him, to which Chloe finds out about their encounter and reveals the truth to Iván. Raúl furiously confronts Sara about the video, and she finally breaks up with him for good. He records an apology video stating that he and Sara were broken up at the time the video was posted, and asserts Chloe's innocence on the conflict. Martín manipulates Isadora into approving an eviction of a complex she owns allegedly in a bad state, which houses Omar's apartment. After they get a court order to leave in ten days, Omar, Joel and their flatmate Dalmar confront Isadora and Dídac tells her to call it off. After pondering the subject, Isadora decides to reverse the eviction. Angered, Martín orders Dídac to stop messing with his daughter's head and stay away from her. Having revealed to him that he's a cop, Luis convinces Dídac to team up in order to arrest Martín. Believing it to be the only way for them to be together, Dídac accepts.
| 55 | 7 | "Solo abrázame" | Just Hug Me | Ana Vázquez | Carlos Montero, Lluís Mosquera and Jaime Vaca | 20 October 2023 |
Joel is influenced by Omar's mental state and emotionally blackmailed into staying with him, which worries Dalmar, who points out that Omar is clearly seeking attention and doesn't want to be alone. While Isadora is asleep, Dídac takes pictures of some documents that implicate Catalina in baby trafficking and sends them to Luis. However, Isadora had predicted this and switched the papers on purpose while setting up a camera that caught Dídac on the act. Rocío asks Nico to let her crash at his house for a while to avoid her mother. Rocío unintentionally triggers Eric's temper and causes him to relapse and burn his meds. The next morning, Rocío finds out that he's gone and feels guilty. Chloe moves in with Raúl, but he starts controlling her just like he used to do with Sara, who uses a phony account to monitor them. Carmen disapproves of how Raúl is changing Chloe, but she refuses to talk to her and informs her that she told everything to Iván and he wants nothing to do with them. Later, Iván meets up with Carmen, and promises her (and later gives her) the amount of money she requests while expressing his disappointment for abandoning him and telling her that they should never see each other again.
| 56 | 8 | "Voy a acabar con esto para siempre" | I’m Gonna End This Forever | Ana Vázquez | Jaime Vaca | 20 October 2023 |
Nico kicks Eric out after finding out about his relapse. Eric retreats to a rooftop to kill himself, though not before texting Sonia through the self-help app. After she alerts Nico, he stops him from going through with it. Sara tricks Raúl into having sex with her and captures it on video, which she sends to Chloe. After watching it, Chloe slaps Raúl, who attacks her. Carmen arrives just in time to safely get Chloe to leave, argues with Raúl, and eventually pushes him off a balcony, killing him. Iván invites Joel to join him on the South Africa exchange program, but, after hearing and taking to heart Dalmar's point, he decides not to go and focus on himself. Omar resumes his therapy. Isadora feels betrayed when she learns about Dídac's role to take down her family. Despite Luis explaining the large history of their crimes, Isadora refuses to take any part, until Rocío manages to change her mind. She arranges a meeting with Catalina, who is double-crossed by Martín, who attempts to have her executed. Rocío arrives and both are held hostage, until the police intervene and arrest both the thugs and Catalina. Isadora reveals a hidden microphone, having tricked her father into confessing to his crimes and he is arrested as well. However, she leaves her mother out of this and still refuses to get back with Dídac. Carmen and Chloe frame Raúl's murder as a suicide. Dalmar is revealed to have witnessed Raúl falling off and having a video of Carmen as the killer, unsure of what to do next.

=== Season 8 (2024) ===
| No. overall | No. in season | Title | English title | Directed by | Written by | Original release date |
|---|---|---|---|---|---|---|
| 57 | 1 | "Alumni" | Alumni | Daniel Barone | Jaime Vaca | 26 July 2024 |
Another all too familiar tragedy hits Las Encinas yet again. Omar receives a surprise visitor. An exclusive club joins the school and begins to recruit members from the senior class. With Martin in jail, Isadora is now in financial ruins.
| 58 | 2 | "Al extremo" | To the Edge | Daniel Barone | Alberto Manzano Ruiz and Jaime Vaca | 26 July 2024 |
The rift between Ivan and Joel widens as Hector gets in between. Chloe makes a devastating choice for her future, as Carmen fights to protect hers. Dalmar receives upsetting news.
| 59 | 3 | "Combustión" | Combustion | Jota Linares | Iker Azkoitia and Jaime Vaca | 26 July 2024 |
A high stakes event puts everything on the line for Joel and Isadora. Dalmar finds himself further in deeper trouble. A party goes awry, forcing one of the students to make a deal with the devil.
| 60 | 4 | "No soy de nadie" | I Belong to No One | Jota Linares | Flora G. Villanueva | 26 July 2024 |
A enticing offer presents Joel with a new avenue. To save her mom, Chloe lays an unexpected trap. New enemies put Omar's life on the line. Sara and Nico begin to bond.
| 61 | 5 | "La última noche" | The Last Night | Ginesta Guindal | Flora G. Villanueva | 26 July 2024 |
The events that transpired the night of the murder unfold. Dalmar considers a new strategy as Chloe and Eric devise theirs. Joel confesses a secret to Ivan. Luis begins to develop an unhealthy obsession for Isa.
| 62 | 6 | "Culpable" | Guilty | Ginesta Guindal | Alberto Manzano Ruiz and Jaime Vaca | 26 July 2024 |
Joel's murder leads to two shocking arrests. Emilia and Hector begin to cover for themselves as Omar begins to seek vengeance. Sara learns more about the day of Raul's murder.
| 63 | 7 | "Como hermanos" | Like Siblings | Elena Trapé | Iker Azkoitia and Jaime Vaca | 26 July 2024 |
Hector and Emilia's bond begin skate on thin ice. Despite Nadia's instance, Omar is hesitant to report his attackers. As Joel's murder investigation moves forward, Isadora, Ivan and Sara hatch a plan to trap Chloe and Eric.
| 64 | 8 | "Fin de curso" | End of Term | Elena Trapé | Carlos Montero | 26 July 2024 |
Knowing who killed Joel, Isadora decides to take justice in her hands as she has one final epic showdown with the killer. After years of tragedies, Las Encinas finally confronts its past sins and delivers a final surprise that will forever change the students' lives.
