= Apaches (TV series) =

Spanish television series

- Genre: Crime drama; Thriller
- Based on: Apaches by Miguel Sáez Carral
- Written by: Miguel Sáez Carral; Carlos Montero; María López Castaño
- Directed by: Daniel Calparsoro; Alberto Ruiz Rojo; Miguel Ángel Vivas
- Starring: Alberto Ammann; Eloy Azorín; Verónica Echegui
- Country of origin: Spain
- Original language: Spanish
- No. of seasons: 1
- No. of episodes: 12

Production
- Production company: New Atlantis

Original release
- Network: Netflix
- Release: 8 September 2017

Apaches is a Spanish drama television series starring Alberto Ammann, Eloy Azorín and Verónica Echegui. Produced by New Atlantis for Atresmedia, it was however globally released by Netflix in September 2017, only to be broadcast on the free-to-air channel Antena 3 in Spain later, in early 2018.

== Premise ==
The story is set in the 1990s, in the "gritty" district of Tetuán, Madrid. Miguel (Alberto Ammann) has left the working-class neighborhood behind and has become a promising journalist based on the centre of Madrid, living with Cris (Elena Ballesteros), a lawyer. However, after his father becomes the victim of a fraud that ruined him, Miguel is forced to return to the neighborhood and turn into a criminal in order to save his family and avenge his father. There he meets his childhood friend Sastre (Eloy Azorín), a lowkey criminal in a relationship with Miranda (Ingrid García-Jonsson), and the two friends enter a rampage of robberies and burglaries. Everything goes as planned until the emergence of Carol (Verónica Echegui), the girlfriend of the dangerous criminal boss "El Chatarrero" (Paco Tous), threatens to jeopardise their plans.

== Cast ==
- Alberto Ammann as Miguel.
- Eloy Azorín as Sastre.
- Verónica Echegui as Carol.
- Ingrid García-Jonsson as Miranda.
- Paco Tous as El Chatarrero.
- Críspulo Cabezas as Dela.
- Edgar Costas as Boris.
- Elena Ballesteros as Cris.
- Claudia Traisac as Vicky.
- Lucía Jiménez as Teresa.
- Lluis Soler as Miguel's father.
- Nerea Barros as Silvia.

== Production and release ==
Atresmedia's flagship channel Antena 3 announced its intention to adapt the Miguel Sáez Carral's novel Apaches (Planeta, 2014) in May 2014. The series was produced by New Atlantis. Adapted from Sáez Carral's novel, the screenplay was written by Sáez himself in collaboration with Carlos Montero and María López Castaño. Daniel Calparsoro, Alberto Ruiz Rojo and Miguel Ángel Vivas co-directed the series (Calparsoro episodes 1–4, Ruiz Rojo episodes 5–8 and Vivas episodes 9–12).

Shooting locations included the Fuerte de San Francisco housing area in Guadalajara, as well as Fuencarral and Villaverde in Madrid.

The pilot was pre-screened in 2015 and the release of the series was tentatively scheduled for Autumn 2015, yet Atresmedia eventually shelved the 12-episode series. The media group later reached an agreement with Netflix for the distribution of the series, which was subsequently made available to the global market on 8 September 2017. The first episode eventually aired in Spain on Antena 3 on 8 January 2018, after its release on Netflix. The original free-to-air run in Antena 3 ended on 26 March 2018.

Series	Episodes	Originally released	Network	Ref.
1	12	8 September 2017	Netflix	

No. in series	Title	Directed by	Original release date
1	"La mala suerte"	Daniel Calparsoro	8 September 2017
2	"La verdad por delante"	Daniel Calparsoro	8 September 2017
3	"Lealtad"	Daniel Calparsoro	8 September 2017
4	"Veinte calles"	Daniel Calparsoro	8 September 2017
5	"La ley del barrio"	Alberto Ruiz Rojo	8 September 2017
6	"Verano indio"	Alberto Ruiz Rojo	8 September 2017
7	"Desfortuna"	Alberto Ruiz Rojo	8 September 2017
8	"Un lugar en el mundo"	Alberto Ruiz Rojo	8 September 2017
9	"La despedida"	Miguel Ángel Vivas	8 September 2017
10	"Una piedra en el corazón"	Miguel Ángel Vivas	8 September 2017
11	"La noche de los cristales"	Miguel Ángel Vivas	8 September 2017
12	"El hombre que realmente eres"	Miguel Ángel Vivas	8 September 2017

Free-to-air run on Antena 3

No.	Original date	Viewers (Spain)	Share (%)	Ref.
1	8 January 2018	2,259,000	13.1	
2	15 January 2018	1,695,000	10.1	
3	22 January 2018	1,533,000	9.9	
4	29 January 2018	1,267,000	7.8	
5	5 February 2018	1,160,000	7.0	
6	12 February 2018	1,251,000	8.1	
7	19 February 2018	1,082,000	7.2	
8	26 February 2018	1,155,000	9.5	
9	5 March 2018	1,081,000	7.5	
10	12 March 2018	1,042,000	7.1	
11	19 March 2018	1,112,000	7.3	
12	26 March 2018	1,083,000	7.0	
Series average		1,310,000	8.5	
