= Feria: The Darkest Light =

Spanish fantasy thriller television series

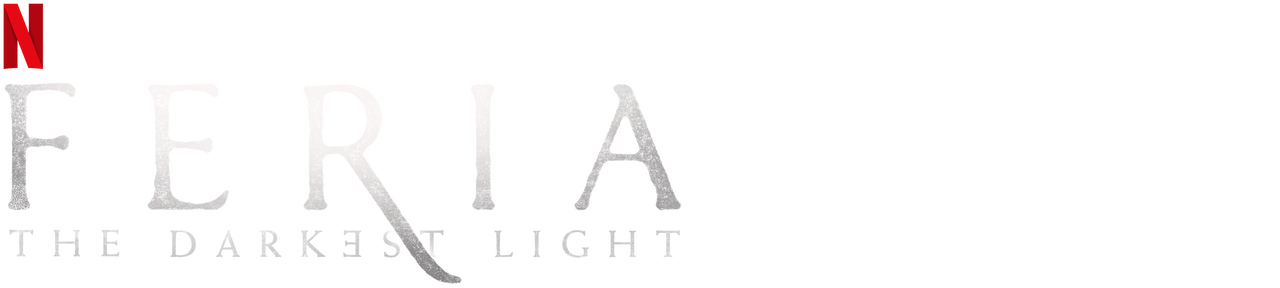
- Spanish: Feria: La luz más oscura
- Genre: Fantasy; Thriller; Supernatural horror
- Created by: Carlos Montero; Agustín Martínez
- Directed by: Jorge Dorado; Carles Torrens
- Starring: Marta Nieto; Ana Tomeno; Carla Campra; Patricia López; Isak Férriz; Ernest Villegas; Ángela Cremonte
- Country of origin: Spain
- Original language: Spanish
- No. of seasons: 1
- No. of episodes: 8

Production
- Production company: Filmax

Original release
- Network: Netflix
- Release: 28 January 2022

Feria: The Darkest Light (Spanish: Feria: La luz más oscura) is a Spanish fantasy thriller supernatural horror television series created by Agustín Martínez and Carlos Montero, produced by Filmax. It is set in 1990s Andalusia, where two sisters must face a new reality—and supernatural elements—as it is revealed their parents participated in a cult ritual ending in 23 deaths. The series premiered on Netflix on 28 January 2022 and was canceled after the first season due to indifferent reception.

== Premise ==
The plot of the fantasy thriller series is set in an Andalusian village in the mid 1990s and it follows two teenage sisters, Eva and Sofía. They find out that their parents, who have just disappeared, have committed a crime with a toll of 23 deaths. Sofia, wishing to see her mother again, follows the cult to open the doorway to the 'Kingdom' (aka hell). Eva is having trouble finding her sister and has constant hallucinations. Their parents tried to stop the doorway to the 'Kingdom' and the mother was trapped there for stopping it. Sofia opens it and realizes too late she unleashed the devil. She hopes to be able to get her mother out of the 'Kingdom'.

== Cast ==
- Ana Tomeno as Eva
- Carla Campra as Sofía
- Marta Nieto as Elena
- Patricia López as Sandra
- Isak Férriz as Guillén
- Ernest Villegas as Pablo
- Ángela Cremonte as Blanca
- Jorge Motos as Chisco

== Production and release ==
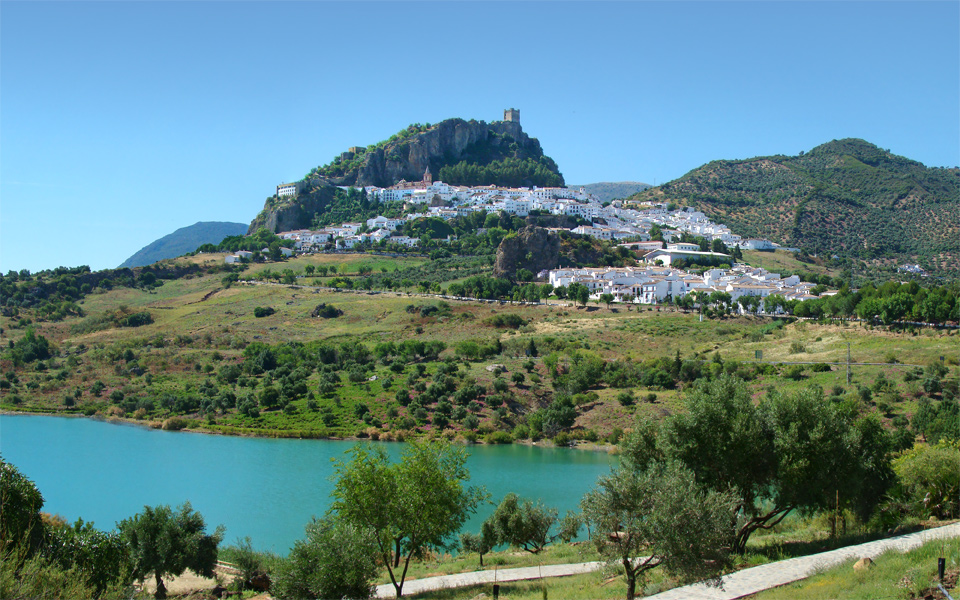
Zahara de la Sierra is one of the main shooting locations.

Feria is created by Carlos Montero and Agustín Martínez. Produced by Filmax and directed by Jorge Dorado and Carles Torrens, it consists of 8 episodes with a running time of about 50 minutes. Netflix announced the start of the filming on 16 November 2020. After shooting in Minas de Riotinto (province of Huelva), production moved to Zahara de la Sierra (province of Cádiz), where shooting started on 26 February 2021. The presence of the production team reportedly gave some relief to the tourism-centered economy of the village, in the off-season because of the COVID-19 pandemic.

== Episodes ==
No.	Title	Directed by	Written by	Original release date
1	"The Red Lake"	Jorge Dorado	Agustín Martínez & Carlos Montero	28 January 2022
2	"Babylon"	Jorge Dorado	Agustín Martínez & Carlos Montero	28 January 2022
3	"Offering"	Jorge Dorado	Agustín Martínez, Carlos Montero & Mikel Santiago	28 January 2022
4	"The Temple"	Jorge Dorado	Agustín Martínez & Carlos Montero	28 January 2022
5	"The God of Fire"	Carles Torrens	Agustín Martínez & Carlos Montero	28 January 2022
6	"Bloody Feria"	Carles Torrens	Agustín Martínez, Carlos Montero & Mikel Santiago	28 January 2022
7	"The Apocalypse According to Pablo"	Carles Torrens	Agustín Martínez & Carlos Montero	28 January 2022
8	"The Solitary King"	Jorge Dorado	Agustín Martínez & Carlos Montero	28 January 2022
