= Combustion (film) =

- Film poster
- Spanish: Combustión
- Directed by: Daniel Calparsoro
- Screenplay by: Carlos Montero; Jaime Vaca; Daniel Calparsoro
- Starring: Álex González; Adriana Ugarte; Alberto Ammann
- Cinematography: Daniel Aranyó
- Edited by: David Pinillos; Antonio Frutos
- Music by: Carlos Jean
- Production companies: Zeta Cinema; A3 Films
- Distributed by: Sony Pictures Releasing de España
- Release dates: 21 April 2013 (Málaga); 26 April 2013 (Spain)
- Running time: 99 minutes
- Country: Spain
- Language: Spanish

Combustion (Spanish: Combustión) is a 2013 Spanish action film directed and co-written by Daniel Calparsoro which stars Álex González, Adriana Ugarte, and Alberto Ammann.

== Cast ==
- Alberto Ammann as Navas
- Adriana Ugarte as Ari
- Álex González as Mikel
- María Castro as Julia
- Marta Nieto as Carla
- Juan Pablo Shuk as Argentino
- Luis Zahera
- Christian Mulas

== Production ==
The screenplay was penned by Carlos Montero, Jaime Vaca and Calparsoro. The film is a Zeta Cinema and Antena 3 Films production. Shooting began on 22 September 2012 on locations including Lisbon and Madrid. Carlos Jean was responsible for the score.

== Release ==
Combustion premiered at the 16th Málaga Film Festival's main competition on 21 April 2013. Distributed by Sony Pictures, it was theatrically released in Spain on 26 April 2013.

== See also ==
- List of Spanish films of 2013
