= Lynn Fainchtein =

Mexican music producer (1963–2024)

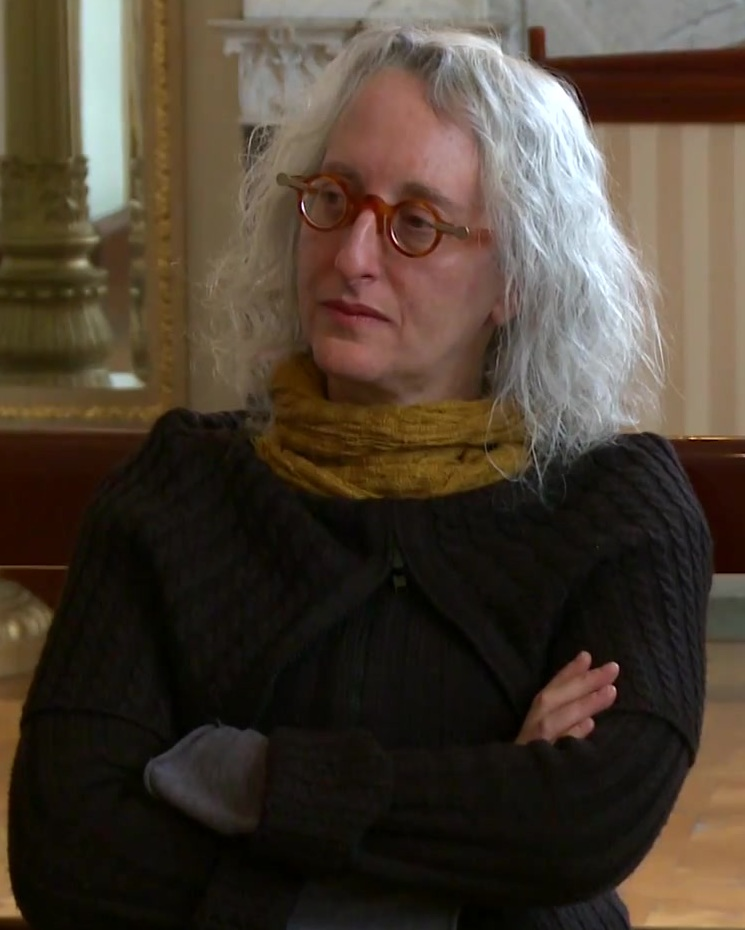
- Fainchtein in 2016
- Born: 1963
- Died: 1 March 2024 (aged 61); Madrid, Spain
- Education: National Autonomous University of Mexico
- Occupation: Music producer

Lynn Fainchtein (1963 – 1 March 2024) was a Mexican music producer and musical supervisor who worked in television and film. She worked with Lee Daniels on the films Precious, The Butler, and The United States vs. Billie Holiday, and she received a Grammy Award for Best Compilation Soundtrack for Visual Media for the latter. She supervised the music on Alfonso Cuarón's Golden Globe winning feature-length film Roma alongside Randall Poster.

She was born in 1963 into a Russian-Jewish family. She studied psychology at the National Autonomous University of Mexico and worked in radio for a decade. In 2000, she began supervising the soundtracks for feature films such as Fernando Sariñana's Mexican crime film Gimme the Power.

González Iñárritu was a long-standing collaborator of Fainchtein's and she contributed to 21 Grams, Babel, and Birdman, among others. She died on 1 March 2024 in Madrid, Spain, where she lived, at the age of 61.
