= The Mess You Leave Behind =

Historical drama television series

- Spanish: El desorden que dejas
- Genre: Thriller; Drama
- Created by: Carlos Montero
- Based on: El desorden que dejas by Carlos Montero
- Written by: Carlos Montero; Javier Holgado; Andrés Seara
- Directed by: Carlos Montero; Silvia Quer; Roger Gual
- Starring: Inma Cuesta; Bárbara Lennie; Tamar Novas; Arón Piper; Roberto Enríquez
- Opening theme: "La espina de la flor en tu costado" by Xoel López
- Composers: Lucio Godoy; Ricardo Curto
- Country of origin: Spain
- Original language: Spanish
- No. of seasons: 1
- No. of episodes: 8

Production
- Producer: Emma Lustres
- Production company: Vaca Films

Original release
- Network: Netflix
- Release: 11 December 2020

The Mess You Leave Behind (Spanish: El desorden que dejas) is a Spanish thriller drama television limited series created by Carlos Montero for Netflix, based on his novel of the same name. The series, starring Inma Cuesta and Bárbara Lennie, tracks a literature teacher who takes a substitute teaching position in a small fictional town in rural Galicia (Novariz) and learns that her predecessor died mysteriously.

The series premiered on 11 December 2020 on Netflix.

== Main cast ==
- Inma Cuesta as Raquel Valero, a new literature teacher
- Bárbara Lennie as Elvira Ferreiro Martínez "Viruca", the old literature teacher who died under mysterious circumstances
- Tamar Novas as Germán Araujo, Raquel's drug-addicted husband
- Arón Piper as Iago Nogueira, a hotheaded student with a close relationship with Viruca
- Roberto Enríquez as Mauro Muñiz, Viruca's ex-husband
- Roque Ruiz as Roi Fernández, a friend of Iago's with a secret crush
- Isabel Garrido as Nerea Casado, another friend of Iago with a polarised relationship with Viruca
- Fede Pérez as Demetrio Araujo, Germán's brother
- Alfonso Agra as Tomás Nogueira, Iago's abusive father with criminal connections
- Susana Dans as Marga, the school principal
- Xavier Estévez as Ramón, another teacher at the school
- Eduardo Rosa as Simòn, a friend of Germán with whom Raquel had a three-month affair.
- Xosé Touriñán as Gabriel Acevedo, a friend of Germán
- Maria Tasende as Iria, the school's English teacher
- María Costas as Claudia, Germán's mother
- Abril Zamora as Tere, Raquel's old friend
- Ana Santos as Concha, a bartender

== Production ==
The Mess You Leave Behind was filmed in locations in Galicia including Celanova, Ourense, whose public high school (the one in which the creator studied) was used to recreate the high school where characters Raquel and Viruca teach.

== Episodes ==
No.	Title	Directed by	Written by	Original release date
1	"Into the Lion's Den" (En la boca del lobo)	Carlos Montero	Carlos Montero	11 December 2020
2	"They Know" (Lo saben)	Carlos Montero	Carlos Montero	11 December 2020
3	"Count to Three" (Cuenta hasta tres)	Silvia Quer	Javier Holgado Vicente	11 December 2020
4	"Downward Spiral" (Caída en picado)	Silvia Quer	Carlos Montero	11 December 2020
5	"The Secret Place" (El lugar secreto)	Silvia Quer	Javier Holgado Vicente	11 December 2020
6	"Your Dark Side" (Lo que no quiso ver en ti)	Roger Gual	Andrés Seara and Carlos Montero	11 December 2020
7	"The Third Victim" (La tercera víctima)	Roger Gual	Javier Holgado Vicente	11 December 2020
8	"The Mess You Leave Behind" (El desorden que dejas)	Roger Gual	Carlos Montero	11 December 2020

== Awards and nominations ==
Year	Award	Category	Nominee(s)	Result	Ref.
2021	19th Mestre Mateo Awards	Best Television Series		Nominated	
2021	19th Mestre Mateo Awards	Best Screenplay	Carlos Montero, Javier Holgado, Andrés Seara	Nominated	
2021	19th Mestre Mateo Awards	Best Editing	Juan Galiñanes, Lu Rodríguez, Mario Maroto	Nominated	
2021	19th Mestre Mateo Awards	Best Sound		Nominated	
2021	19th Mestre Mateo Awards	Best Makeup and Hairstyling	Susana Veira, Beatriz Antelo	Nominated	
2021	19th Mestre Mateo Awards	Best Lead Actress	Inma Cuesta	Nominated	
2021	19th Mestre Mateo Awards	Best Supporting Actor	Tamar Novas	Nominated	
2021	19th Mestre Mateo Awards	Best Supporting Actress	Isabel Garrido	Nominated	
