= Carlos Montero Castiñeira =

Spanish screenwriter (born 1972)

- Born: 9 October 1972 (age 53); Celanova, province of Ourense, Galicia, Spain
- Education: Complutense University of Madrid
- Occupations: Screenwriter; Film Producer; Film Director; Television Producer
- Years active: 1993–present
- Notable work: Física o Química (2008–2011); Elite (2018–2024); The Mess You Leave Behind (2020)

Carlos Montero Castiñeira (born 9 October 1972) is a Spanish screenwriter, film producer, film director and television producer. Featuring an extensive background as writer of teen drama television series, he is the creator of Física o Química and Elite.

== Biography ==
Carlos Montero was born on 9 October 1972 in Celanova, Province of Ourense, Montero earned a licentiate degree in Information Sciences (Journalism) from the Complutense University of Madrid (UCM).

== Career ==
Starting at 25 years old, he wrote the screenplay of hundreds of episodes of the teen drama series Al salir de clase from 1997 to 1999. He was the creator of another popular teen drama series, Física o Química (2008–2011). He co-wrote together with Jaime Vaca the screenplay of the Daniel Calparsoro's film Combustión, released in 2013.

He also worked in other television series such as El tiempo entre costuras (The Time in Between), Apaches, and El comisario.

Working for Netflix, he created the teen drama series Élite together with Darío Madrona and created the Netflix series El desorden que dejas (The Mess You Leave Behind), an adaptation of his own novel, winner of the 2016 Premio Primavera de Novela. He partnered again with Madrona to write the screenplay of the 2019 film Gente que viene y bah (In Family I Trust), adapting the novel by Laura Norton. He co-created together with Agustín Martínez the Netflix fantasy thriller series Feria, which began filming in 2021.

In 2024, he was showrunner, co-writer and executive producer on the hospital-set drama Breathless for Netflix.

== Filmography ==
=== Movies ===
Year	Movie	Director	Notes
1993	En casa de Diego		Film Director
1995	David		Film Director
2003	La vida aquí	Jesús Font	Screenwriter
2010	Dinero fácil		Film Director; Screenwriter; Film Producer
2011	Dieciséis		Film Director
2013	Combustion	Daniel Calparsoro	Screenwriter
2013	Boys on Film 9: Youth in trouble		Film Director
2016	Don't Blame the Karma for Being an Idiot	María Ripoll	Screenwriter
2019	In Family I Trust	Patricia Font	Screenwriter

=== Television ===
Year	Title	Channel	Notes
1997–1998	Al salir de clase	Telecinco	
2000–2004	El comisario	Telecinco	Screenwriter
2005	Maneras de sobrevivir	La 1	Creator; Original Idea
2006–2007	Génesis: en la mente del asesino	Cuatro	Creator; Original Idea
2008–2011	Física o Química	Antena 3	Creator; Screenwriter
2013	The Time in Between	Antena 3	Screenwriter
2013–2014	Vive cantando	Antena 3	Screenwriter
2014	Cuéntame un cuento	Antena 3	Screenwriter
2017	Apaches	Netflix	Screenwriter
2018–2024	Elite	Netflix	Creator; Producer
2020	The Mess You Leave Behind	Netflix	Creator
2021	Élite: historias breves	Netflix	Creator; Screenwriter
2021	Feria	Netflix	Creator; Screenwriter; Producer
2023	In Love All Over Again	Netflix	Creator; Screenwriter; Producer
2024–present	Breathless	Netflix	Creator; Screenwriter

=== Novels ===
- 2012: Los tatuajes no se borran con láser
- 2016: The Mess You Leave Behind (Premio Primavera de Novela 2016)
