= List of Spanish films of 2027 =

A list of Spanish-produced and co-produced feature films released or scheduled for release in Spain in 2027 and beyond. When applicable, the domestic theatrical release date is favoured.

== Film openings ==
Release		Title (Domestic title)	Cast and crew	Distribution label	Ref.
J A N U A R Y	1	Familiar Strangers (Perfectos conocidos)	Director: Javier Fesser Cast: Juana Acosta, Ernesto Alterio, Elena Irureta, Miguel Rellán	Universal Pictures	
J A N U A R Y	1	The Brat Brigade (¡Vaya tropa!)	Director: Curro Velázquez Cast: Alexandra Jiménez, Carlos Santos, María Adánez, Luna Fulgencio, Eduardo Rodríguez, Pablo Cabello, María García, Leo Harlem, El Langui, Mariano Peña, Paco Tous, Fernando Tejero	Buena Vista International	
J A N U A R Y	6	Carte Blanche (Carta blanca)	Director: Gerardo Herrero Cast: Iván Pellicer, Salva Reina, Víctor Clavijo	Karma Films	
J A N U A R Y	22	5 More Minutes (5 minutos más)	Director: Javier Ruiz Caldera Cast: Berto Romero, Belén Cuesta, Javier Cámara	Filmax	
J A N U A R Y	22	A morte nos teus ollos	Director: Guillermo de Oliveira Cast: Pepe Lorente, Iván Marcos	Buena Vista International	
J A N U A R Y	27	The Confidant (El confidente)	Director: Daniel Calparsoro Cast: Miguel Herrán, Javier Gutiérrez, Itsaso Arana, Emilio Palacios, Víctor Clavijo	Sony Pictures	
F E B R U A R Y	12	Bunker	Director: Florian Zeller Cast: Javier Bardem, Penélope Cruz, Stephen Graham, Paul Dano, Patrick Schwarzenegger	Elastica	
F E B R U A R Y	12	Girl and Wolf (Chica y lobo)	Director: Roc Espinet Cast: Anna Castillo, David Verdaguer	39 Escalones Films	
F E B R U A R Y	19	A Family (Una familia)	Director: Ricardo Gómez Cast: Víctor Lite, Claudia Traisac, Patrick Criado, Ana Wagener	Filmax	
F E B R U A R Y	19	Upiro	Director: Óscar Martín Cast: Diego Anido, Pauline Brisy, Victoria Cerrada, Javier Botet, María Galiana, Juanjo Puigcorbé	SelectaVisión	
F E B R U A R Y	19	No Way Out (Atrapado)	Director: Ignacio Salazar-Simpson Cast: Salva Reina, Damián Alcázar, Javier Godino, María de Nati	Tripictures	
F E B R U A R Y	19	The End of It	Director: Maria Martínez Bayona Cast: Rebecca Hall, Noomi Rapace, Gael García Bernal, David Verdaguer	La Aventura	
F E B R U A R Y	26	Saints (Sants)	Director: Mikel Gurrea Cast: Victoria Luengo, Eulàlia Ramon, Ariadna Gil	Elastica Films	
F E B R U A R Y	TBA	Dante	Director: Hugo Ruiz Cast: Chino Darín, Ester Expósito, Vicente Romero, Enrique Arce, Asier Etxeandia	Eterno Films Distribution	
M A R C H	19	La Roja	Director: Marcel Barrena Cast: Paco León, Atul Vijaykumar, Carolina Yuste, Óscar de la Fuente	Beta Fiction	
A P R I L	16	Big Game Hunt (Caza mayor)	Director: Daniel Sánchez Arévalo Cast: Antonio de la Torre, Mariló Márquez Villa, Julián Villagrán	Warner Bros. Pictures	
A P R I L	16	Buitres	Director: Claudia Pinto Cast: Quim Gutiérrez, Clara Lago, Raúl Prieto, Melani Olivares	Buena Vista International	
M A Y	14	El profesor	Director: Daniel Castro Cast: Javier Gutiérrez, Gonzalo de Castro	A Contracorriente Films	
M A Y	28	Caer de pie	Director: Salvador Calvo Cast: Marina Salas, Daniel Ibáñez, Carmen Ruiz, Josean Bengoetxea, Raúl Prieto, Pilar Gómez, Carlos González, Pedro Casablanc, Alicia Borrachero, Sonia Almarcha, Ignacio Mateos	LaZona Pictures	
J U L Y	9	Blanco	Director: Félix Viscarret Cast: Mikel Bustamante, Susana Abaitua, Urko Olazabal, Amaia Aberasturi, Miguel Garcés, David Lorente, Israel Elejalde, Ramón Barea, Eneko Sagardoy, Jon Ander Urresti, Natalia Huarte, Carlos Scholz, Lander Otaola	Universal Pictures	
J U L Y	16	Operación Camarón 2	Director: Carlos Therón Cast: Julián López, Carlos Librado, Diego Anido, María Pujalte, Manuel Manquiña	Buena Vista International	
J U L Y	30	Campeones 3	Director: Víctor García León	Universal Pictures	
A U G U S T	18	El casoplón 2	Director: Ana Vázquez Cast: Pablo Chiapella, Raquel Guerrero, Nerea Pascual, Noah Casas, Álvaro Lafuente, Edurne	Buena Vista International	
D E C E M B E R	3	Si los muertos hablaran	Director: Nacho G. Velilla Cast: Carmen Machi, Hugo Silva, Maribel Verdú, Megan Montaner, Ingrid García-Jonsson, Alain Hernández, Claudia Salas, Marcelo Subiotto, Jason Fernández, Stephanie Gil, Santiago Korovsky, Juanjo Bona	Amazon MGM Studios	

== TBA ==
Release	Title (Domestic title)	Cast & Crew	Distribution label	Ref.
TBD
TBD	Ana no	Director: Paz Vega Cast: Ángela Molina, Álvaro Morte, Rossy de Palma, Alessio Boni	BTeam Pictures	
TBD	Domani	Director: Santos Bacana Cast: Daniel Ibáñez, Milena Smit, Rubén Ochandiano, Flores Valdepeñas, Ilse Salas, Mina Serrano, Gustavo Salmerón, Diego Calva, Antón Álvarez	Elastica	
TBD	Disforia	Director: Christopher Cartagena Cast: Claudia Salas, Fariba Sheikhan, Eloy Azorín, Ferrán Vilajosana, Kike Guaza, Aleida Torrent, Noah Casas	—N/a	
TBD	Head on the Wall (Una cabeza en la pared)	Director: Manuel Manrique Cast: Nacho Sánchez, Iria del Río, Miguel Bernardeau	Filmax	
TBD	Watch Your Dreams (Lucidez)	Director: Gonzalo Bendala Cast: Óscar Casas, Fiona Palomo, José Coronado, Najwa Nimri	—N/a	
TBD	The Sentence (Los relatos)	Director: Miguel del Arco Cast: Juan Diego Botto, Marta Etura, Ainara Elejalde	Sideral Cinema	
TBD	Toda la suerte del mundo	Director: Esther Ortega Cast: Carolina Yuste, Jaime Lorente, David Verdaguer, Óscar de la Fuente, Antonio Molero, Fer Fraga, Sofía Otero	—N/a	
TBD	The Mantises (Las mantis)	Director: Dídac Gimeno Cast: Venecia Franco, Iván García, Maria Caballero, Ruth Díaz, José Luis García Pérez	Silencio Cinema	
TBD	La Regenta	Director: Mar Coll Cast: Ester Expósito, Vito Sanz, Oriol Pla, Borja Luna, Clara Ingold, Carlos González, Ana Torrent, Itsaso Arana, Gonzalo de Castro	Netflix	
TBD	The Swimmer (A nadadora)	Director: Sandra Sánchez Cast: Nuria López, María de Dina, Diego Anido, Melania Cruz, Lucía Veiga, Federico Pérez Rey	—N/a	
TBD	La cuidadora	Director: Álex de la Iglesia Cast: Carmen Maura, Blanca Suárez, Marta Hazas, Asier Etxeandia, David Comrie	Netflix	
TBD	Todo arde	Director: Samantha López Speranza Cast: Aura Garrido, Victoria Teijeiro, Maria Rodríguez Soto, Silvia Abascal, Emma Suárez, Francesc Orella	Amazon Prime Video	
TBD	Ilusión de verano	Director: Alex Comas Cast: Jordi Banacolocha, Claud Hernández, Marc Pineda	Rescat Films	
TBD	Ella en mil pedazos	Director: Ramón Luque Cast: Julia Piera, Ana Capella, Laura Cepeda, Carlos Cabra, José Troncoso, Héctor González	—N/a	
TBD	Amigo invisible	Cast: Pablo J. Cosco Cast: Ariadna Cabrol, Max Marieges, Candela Antón, Joaquín Castellano, Tony Martínez	—N/a	
TBD	Minotauro	Director: Julio Medem Cast: Pablo Derqui, Àstrid Bergès-Frisbey, Catalina Sopelana, Aylin Prandi, Enrique Arce	—N/a	
TBD	Control Room	Director: Luiso Berdejo Cast: Loreto Mauleón, Óscar Casas, Alexandra Masangkay, Junio Valverde, Luna Fulgencio, Cristóbal Pinto, Tania Watson, Aitor Luna	—N/a	
TBD	El desencanto	Director: Ana Rujas	—N/a	
TBD	Cuántica rave	Director: Paco Campano Cast: Antonio Dechent, Pablo Carbonell, Javier Botet, África de la Cruz	—N/a	
TBD	Luna	Director: Alfonso Cortés-Cavanillas Cast: Marian Álvarez, Greta Fernández, Asier Etxeandia, Roberto Álamo, Nur Olabarría, Asier Flores, Jaime Martín, Marta Larralde	—N/a	
TBD	The Bad Names (Els mals noms)	Director: Marc Ortiz Cast: Pablo Molinero, Àlex Bausà, Adrià Nebot, Nacho Fresneda, Isak Férriz	—N/a	
TBD	Caballé	Director: Patricia Ortega Cast: Begoña Alberdi, Ana Saavedra, Núria Prims, David Bages, Mercè Arànega, Marina Comas, Pep Pla, Pep Munné, Carles Francino	Filmax	
TBD	Maria Martinez Ruiz Can't Come Back (María Martínez Ruiz no puede volver)	Director: Óscar Bernàcer Cast: Carmen Arrufat, Àlex Monner, Marta Belenguer	—N/a	
TBD	The Possible Lives of My Mother (Las vidas posibles de mi madre)	Director: Jorge Dorado Cast: Marina Guerola, Aída de la Cruz, Ana Wagener, Quim Ávila, Joan Solé, Mónica López, Isak Férriz, Mercedes Sampietro, Etienne Halsdorf	—N/a	
TBD	Salitre	Director: Norma Vila Cast: Nagore Aranburu, Haizea Carneros	Festival Films	
TBD	2+2	Director: Gracia Querejeta Cast: Diego Martín, Natalia Verbeke, Marta Hazas, Sebastián Martínez	—N/a	
TBD	Black Tides	Director: Renny Harlin Cast: Melissa Barrera, John Travolta, Ella Bleu Travolta, Álvaro Mel, Dylan Torrell	—N/a	
TBD	Bypass	Director: Lucía Casañ Rodríguez Cast: Alba Flores	Filmax	
TBD	Tres	Director: María Ruiz Cast: Olivia Molina, Teresa Riott, Aixa Villagrán, Maxi Iglesias	—N/a	
TBD	Unguarded (A puño descubierto)	Director: Mario Casas Cast: Mario Casas, Óscar Casas, Tania Noriega, Migdalia H., Javier Oliveras	Warner Bros. Pictures	
TBD	Don't Hang Up (La noche cerrada)	Director: Belén Macías Cast: Javier Rey, Manuel Morón, Manuela Vellés	AF Pictures	
TBD	Seis tramposos	Director: Fer García-Ruiz Cast: Ernesto Sevilla, Marta Etura, Inma Cuesta, Julián López, Iván Massagué, Ilse Salas	Universal Pictures	
TBD	Surf Love (Entre olas)	Director: Chloé Wallace Cast: Carla Tous, Nuno Gallego, Jan Buxaderas	Warner Bros. Pictures	
TBD	Mi zona	Director: Cristian Beteta Cast: Milena Smit, Roberto Álamo, Irene Escolar, Diego Anido, Eva Llorach, Estefanía de los Santos	—N/a	
TBD	El acercamiento de la mujer cactus y el hombre globo	Director: Kike Maíllo Cast: Macarena García, Carlos Cuevas, Eva Llorach, Santiago Korovsky, Silma López	Netflix	
TBD	Sin huella	Director: Daniel Benmayor Cast: Pedro Alonso, Isabel Naveira, Roque Ruiz, Manuel Manquiña, María Vázquez, Edgar Costas, Chechu Salgado	A Contracorriente Films	
TBD	El sastre del rey	Director: Pedro Casablanc Cast: Jesús Carroza, Natalia de Molina, Mateo Casado, Alberto Ammann, María Gandiaga, Joaquín Núñez, Farah Hamed, Nourdin Batán, Taha El Mahroug, Gonzalo de Castro, David Rodríguez, Candela Ortiz, Roberto Lezana, Alec Baldwin	A Contracorriente Films	
TBD	El futuro testamento	Director: Velasco Broca Cast: Àlex Brendemühl, Mireia Oriol, Ariadna Gil	Filmin	
TBD	Jarabo	Director: Emilio Martínez-Lázaro Cast: Eduardo Noriega, Lucía Guerrero, José Coronado, Karra Elejalde, Luis Callejo, Andrés Gertrúdix, Jorge Sanz	—N/a	
TBD	Un Dios que no baila	Director: Pedro Díaz Cast: María Vázquez, Ana Santos, Bruna Cusí	Sideral Cinema	
TBD	Antonia	Director: Toñi Martín Cast: Nadia de Santiago, Anaïs Bleda, Mercedes Sampietro, Pedro Casablanc, Mercedes Hoyos, Antonio Dechent	—N/a	
TBD	Festina lente	Director: Carlos Villafaina Cast: Nacho Sánchez, Telmo Irureta, Elena Irureta, Sandra Pujol	—N/a	
TBD	Ama	Director: Achero Mañas Cast: Dora Postigo, Gerard Larrondo, Iván Lapadula, Javier Córdoba, Miguel Iriarte, Carlota Huguet, Elisabeth Gelabert, Sergio Peris-Mencheta, Achero Mañas	Wanda Visión	
TBD	Matar a Ramón	Director: Álvaro Fernández Armero Cast: Óscar de la Fuente, Carla Díaz, Yaël Belicha, Israel Elejalde, José Mota	Beta Fiction	
TBD	La Cathédrale	Director: Eduardo Cubillo Cast: Taz Skylar, Marta Nieto, Will Keen, Ronald Guttman, Peter Vives	Deep Com Roots	
TBD	El fons de l'estany	Director: Isaki Lacuesta Cast: Aleix Sagrera, Lluc Miravete, Àlex Brendemühl, Alba Guilera, Quim Àvila	BTeam Pictures	
TBD	Secuestro virtual	Director: Irene Arzuaga Cast: Pol Granch, Georgina Amorós, Lucas Nabor, Francesc Garrido, Ângela Marques, Nora Navas	Filmax	
TBD	A Song for Lena (La vida después)	Director: Clara Santaolaya Cast: Mireia Oriol, Ramón Barea, Luisa Gavasa, Norma Martínez, Miguel Garcés, Martina Cariddi	—N/a	
TBD	Malos sueños	Director: Elio Quiroga Cast: Kimberley Tell, Andrés Velencoso	—N/a	
TBD	Untitled Woody Allen film	Director: Woody Allen Cast: Alexi Wasser, Jemima Kirke, Peter Vives, Marton Csokas, Jakob Oftebro	—N/a	
TBD	Alexia	Director: Lucía Alemany Cast: Madicken Mauri-Sandaker, Emma Masoliver, Roger Casamajor, Marina Salas	—N/a	
TBD	Memorial	Director: Sergi Pérez Cast: Sergi López, Iria del Río, Ramon Pujol, Anna Alarcón, Borja Espinosa	BTeam Pictures	
TBD	Lo vent	Director: Marcel Barrena Cast: Eduard Fernández, Nora Navas, Greta Fernández, Francesc Orella, Williams Bulambo	A Contracorriente Films	
TBD	250 metros	Director: Daniel Monzón Cast: Luis Tosar	—N/a	
TBD	La dona invisible	Director: Cristina Fernández Pintado Cast: Mona Martínez, Victoria Oliver, Sílvia Abril, Lorena López, Amparo Fernández, César Tormo	Vercine	
TBD	Abril, hoy no es invierno	Director: Mabel Lozano Cast: Michelle Jenner, Luis Tosar, Antonio de la Torre, Javier Gutiérrez, Rossy de Palma, Xavi Sáez, Inés Rodríguez, Ángela Boix, Zaida Alonso, Blanca Valletbó	A Contracorriente Films	
TBD	Hestia	Director: Jota Linares Cast: Eneko Sagardoy, Hugo Welzel, Alberto San Juan, Milena Smit, Nicolás Illoro, Yune Nogueiras	Filmax	
TBD	El hijo de todos	Director: Álvaro Brechner Cast: Pol Monen, Laia Manzanares, María Botto, José Luis García Pérez, Asier Etxeandia	Sony Pictures	
TBD	Rafaela	Director: Alba Lozano Cast: Loreto Mauleón, Nerea Sanz, Miguel Garcés	A Contracorriente Films	
TBD	Libre	Director: David Serrano Cast: Alberto San Juan, Jan Serra, Lina de Sol, Secun de la Rosa, Ricardo Gómez, Lorena Calero, Nuria Herrero, Óscar Lasarte	Buena Vista International	
TBD	Rata	Director: Oriol Pérez Alcaraz Cast: Paco León, Miren Ibarguren, Alícia Falcó	Netflix	
TBD	Canción animal	Director: Nerea Castro Cast: Haizea Carneros, Miren Gaztañaga, Nathalie Poza, Mikel Losada, Lola Alterio, Klara Badiola	Filmax	
TBD	Hiru olatuak	Director: Paul Urkijo Alijo Cast: Iñigo Aranbarri, Fariba Sheikhan	Beta Fiction	
TBD	Gloria e Olvido	Director: Paula Cons Cast: Antonio Resines, Nuria Mencía, Victoria Teijeiro	Karma Films	
TBD	Vengo de ese miedo	Director: Violeta Salama Cast: Miguel Herrán, Candela González, Daniel Ibáñez, Marco Cáceres, Bérénice Baôo, Mara Guil, Carlos Lorenzo, Víctor García	—N/a	
TBD	La reina	Director: Laura Mañá Cast: Claudia Salas, Maribel Verdú, Miguel Ángel Silvestre	Filmax	
TBD	Brutal	Director: Albert Pintó Cast: Bárbara Lennie, Carmen Machi, Tristán Ulloa, Marta Nieto, Luis Callejo, Javier Godino, Javier Beltrán	Netflix	
TBD	Días naturales	Director: Jaime Olías Cast: Marco Cáceres, Irene Escolar, Tomás del Estal, Emma Suárez, Salva Reina, Raúl Jiménez, Pilar Gómez	Paramount Pictures	
TBD	Veleta	Director: Paco Torres Cast: Zoe Bonafonte, Dani Rovira, Javier Morgade, Martin Urrutia, Blanca Fernández, Adelfa Calvo, Mariola Fuentes, Eric Masip, Moe Dunford	—N/a	
TBD	Blind Spot (Ángulo muerto)	Director: Mar Targarona Cast: Najwa Nimri, Pako Revueltas	—N/a	
TBD	There's Someone in the Garden (Hi ha algú al jardí)	Director: Jaume Balagueró Cast: Úrsula Corberó	—N/a	
