= Alba Castelló =

Spanish Twitch streamer and aerial dancer

- Born: 22 July 2003 (age 23); Borriol, Castellón, Spain

Instagram information
- Page: alba_castello22
- Followers: 54.5K (22 May 2025)

TikTok information
- Page: Alba Castelló
- Followers: 985.1K (22 May 2025)

Twitch information
- Channel: alba_castello22
- Years active: 2012–present
- Genre: Gaming
- Followers: 6K (22 May 2025)

YouTube information
- Channel: Alba Castelló
- Subscribers: 14.1k (22 May 2025)
- Views: 552k (22 May 2025)

Alba Castelló (22 July 2003) is a Spanish aerial dancer, content creator and Twitch streamer.

She was born on 22 July 2003 in Borriol, Castellón. In 2015 she began creating content on Internet on Musical.ly, and then on YouTube, Instagram, TikTok and Twitch. In 2018 she had a hit on TikTok with a video dancing in the stairs, in which she reached more than 24 millions of views and 965.000 followers, so she began to upload videos constantly since then.

In 2022 she became an aerial dance teacher and teaches at Escola Rodolant Acrobacias. She also participates on L'Squad, by À Punt, which focuses on Valencian content creators, and appeared on HollyBlood as an extra alongside Óscar Casas and Jordi Sánchez. On 23 September 2023 she attended Ritmo, a musical and sport festival in Bonaire, Aldaia.

On 2 April 2024 she was a candidate to become a content creator to represent the esports club Team Heretics, but on 9 April 2024 the finalists were ElviraYuki, Jose Ortega and Totakeki. Eventually, Totakeki was chosen as the winner of Red Bull Draft Heretics.
