= Me has robado el corazón =

- Film poster
- Directed by: Chus Gutiérrez
- Screenplay by: Chus Gutiérrez
- Story by: Alberto Arruty
- Starring: Óscar Casas; Ana Jara; Luis Zahera; Antonio Pagudo; Miguel de Lira; Ana Milán; Arturo Valls; Alba Gutiérrez; Mario Marzo; Pol Granch; Juan Amodeo; Xurxo Carreño; Francis Lorenzo; Lucía Veiga
- Cinematography: Isaac Vila
- Edited by: Julia Juanatey
- Music by: Zeltia Montes
- Production company: Ficción Producciones
- Distributed by: Sony Pictures
- Release date: 5 December 2025
- Running time: 98 minutes
- Country: Spain
- Language: Spanish

Me has robado el corazón is a 2025 Spanish romantic comedy film directed by Chus Gutiérrez. It stars Óscar Casas and Ana Jara.

== Plot ==
After robbing a bank, young engineer Eric tricks his dating app fling Vera into becoming his driver in his flight from Madrid to Galicia.

== Cast ==
- Óscar Casas as Eric
- Ana Jara as Vera
- Luis Zahera
- Antonio Pagudo
- Miguel de Lira
- Ana Milán
- Arturo Valls
- Alba Gutiérrez
- Mario Marzo
- Pol Granch
- Juan Amodeo
- Xurxo Carreño
- Francis Lorenzo
- Lucía Veiga

== Production ==
The film was produced by Ficción Producciones, and it had the association of Sony Pictures Entertainment Iberia, and the participation of RTVE, TVG, and Prime Video. Shooting locations in Galicia included Cambados, O Grove, Santiago de Compostela, Laza, and Verín.

== Release ==
Distributed by Sony Pictures, the film is scheduled to be released theatrically in Spain on 5 December 2025.

== See also ==
- List of Spanish films of 2025
