= List of Spanish films of the 2020s =

Films produced in Spain in the 2020s arranged by year of release on separate pages:

== List of films by year ==
- Spanish films of 2020
- Spanish films of 2021
- Spanish films of 2022
- Spanish films of 2023
- Spanish films of 2024
- Spanish films of 2025
- Spanish films of 2026
- Spanish films of 2027
- Spanish films of 2028
- Spanish films of 2029
