= Domani (2027 film) =

- Directed by: Santos Bacana
- Screenplay by: Santos Bacana; Clara Roquet; Eduard Sola
- Produced by: Cris Trenas; María Zamora
- Starring: Daniel Ibáñez; Milena Smit; Rubén Ochandiano; Ilse Salas; Mina Serrano; Gustavo Salmerón; Diego Calva; Antón Álvarez
- Cinematography: Àlvar Riu Dolz
- Production companies: Movistar Plus; Little Spain; Elastica; Piano
- Distributed by: Elastica
- Release date: 2027
- Country: Spain
- Language: Spanish

Domani is an upcoming comedy thriller film directed by Santos Bacana and co-written by Bacana along with Clara Roquet and Eduard Sola. Led by Daniel Ibáñez, the cast also features Milena Smit, Rubén Ochandiano, Ilse Salas, Mina Serrano, Gustavo Salmerón, Diego Calva, and Antón Álvarez.

== Plot ==
Returning to Madrid from Miami in order to deal with court obligations regarding an old traffic accident, Alfonso Luna finds himself caught up in a series of far-fetched situations with old friends and celebrities.

== Cast ==
- Daniel Ibáñez as Alfonso Luna
- Milena Smit
- Rubén Ochandiano
- Ilse Salas
- Mina Serrano
- Gustavo Salmerón
- Diego Calva
- Antón Álvarez

== Production ==
Domani is Santos Bacana's directorial debut in a fiction feature after directing the documentary This Excessive Ambition and plenty of music videos featuring C. Tangana. Bacana billed the film as "a belated coming-of-age tale", while the creative team also described the film as an auteur blockbuster and mentioned Fellini's comedies as a reference. The film is a Movistar Plus, Little Spain (Cris Trenas) and Elastica (María Zamora) co-production with Piano, and it had backing from the Madrid regional administration and ICAA. In February 2026, it was reported that RTVE had purchased broadcasting rights to the film for €400,000, ahead of the film entering filming. It has a budget of €3.5 million. Cinematographer Àlvar Riu shot Domani in 35 mm film, and used Panavision Primo lenses. Shooting locations in Madrid included the Casa de Campo lake.

== Release ==
Producer Elastica secured theatrical distribution in Spain. A festival release is tentatively intended for 2027.

== See also ==
- List of Spanish films of 2027
