= 71st Valladolid International Film Festival =

2026 film festival

- Location: Valladolid, Castile and León, Spain
- Awards: Golden Spike: Dao; Silver Spike: La Gradiva
- Directors: Javier H. Estrada; Mariona Viader
- Festival date: 23 – 31 October 2026

Valladolid International Film Festival
- 70th

The 71st Valladolid International Film Festival (Seminci) took place from 23 to 31 October 2026 in Valladolid, Castile and León, Spain.

== Background ==
Opening gala host Pepa Blanes

In January 2026, in the wake of the death of Seminci director José Luis Cienfuegos in December 2025, Javier H. Estrada (programming chief) and Mariona Viader (coordinator general) were designated as co-directors of the 71st edition. On 28 July 2026, the co-directors presented a photograph by Apichatpong Weerasethakul displaying the Mekong River as the official poster. An early tranche of 15 official selection and 'Meeting Point' titles was announced in August 2026. In September 2026, Valeria Sarmiento was announced as the recipient of a Honorary Spike together with the addition of Sarmiento's swan song Behind the Rain in an out-of-competition official section slot.

The opening gala was hosted by Pepa Blanes. An Honorary Spike was delivered by Alejandro López to Willie D. Burton. The closing gala was cancelled in the wake of a deadly train accident in the Toledo province.

== Juries ==
International Jury

The main competition jury. From left to right: Grégoire Hetzel, Federico Veiroj, Elena Manrique, Francesca Andreoli, and Dennis Lim

- Francesca Andreoli, Italian producer
- Grégoire Hetzel, French composer
- Dennis Lim, programmer and writer
- Elena Manrique, Spanish filmmaker and producer
- Federico Veiroj, Uruguayan-Spanish filmmaker

== Official Section (Sección Oficial) Feature Films ==
The following films were selected for the 'Official Section' of feature films:

=== Competition ===
English title	Original title	Director(s)	Production countrie(s)
Aquí		Tiago Guedes	Portugal; France
A Bit of Light	کمی نور	Ali Asgari	Iran; Switzerland; Italy; Canada; Turkey
Dao		Alain Gomis	Francia; Senegal; Guinea-Bissau
Double Freedom	La libertad doble	Lisandro Alonso	Chile; Argentina; Luxembourg; Germany; United Kingdom
The Echo Chamber		Andrea Pallaoro	Italy; Belgium
Everytime		Sandra Wollner	Germany; Austria
The Fortunate Isles	Las islas afortunadas	Helena Girón, Samuel M. Delgado	Spain; Greece
Gentle Monster		Marie Kreutzer	Austria; Germany; France
A Good Little Soldier	Un bon petit soldat	Stéphane Brizé	France
La Gradiva		Marine Atlan	France; Italy
I Rarely Wake Up Dreaming	Selten wache ich träumend auf	Isabelle Stever	Germany; Ukraine
A Man of His Time	Notre Salut	Emmanuel Marre	France; Belgium
Mr. Nelson, Did You Kill People?	ネルソンさん、あなたは人を殺しましたか？	Shinya Tsukamoto	Japan; United States; Thailand; Vietnam
My Notes on Mars (opening)		Lili Horvát	Hungary; Austria; Bosnia-Herzegovina; Montenegro; Germany; United States
Prosecution	Staatsschutz	Faraz Shariat	Germany
Queen at Sea		Lance Hammer	United Kingdom; United States
Rose		Markus Schleinzer	Austria; Germany; France
Sisters	Hermanas	Ione Hernández Sáenz	Spain
The Violinist		Ervin Han, Raúl García	Spain; Singapore; Italy
We Are All Strangers	我们不是陌生人	Anthony Chen	Singapore
Woman Unknown	Kvinde ukendt	May el-Toukhy	Denmark; Sweden; Latvia
Yellow Letters	Gelbe Briefe	İlker Çatak	Germany; France; Turkey

=== Out of competition ===
English title	Original title	Director(s)	Production countrie(s)
Behind the Rain	Detrás de la lluvia	Valeria Sarmiento	Chile
The Confidant	El confidente	Daniel Calparsoro	Spain; France
The Electric Kiss	La Vénus électrique	Pierre Salvadori	France; Belgium
Elsinore		Simon Stone	United Kingdom; United States; Italy
A Family	Una familia	Ricardo Gómez	Spain; Peru
Hombre al agua (closing)		Gael García Bernal	Mexico
A Man on a Bridge	Un hombre en un puente	David Martín de los Santos	Spain
A Talent for Murder		Anton Corbijn	United Kingdom; Italy
The Weight		Padraic McKinley	Germany; United States

== Special Screenings ==
English title	Original title	Director(s)	Production countrie(s)
Killing a Bear (series)	Matar a un oso	Jorge Sánchez-Cabezudo, Borja Soler	Spain
SerYo		Marta Solaz, Sergio Peris-Mencheta, Verónica Díaz Pérez	Spain

== Meeting Point (Punto de Encuentro) ==
The following films were selected for the 'Meeting Point' section:

English title	Original title	Director(s)	Production countrie(s)
9 Temples to Heaven	9 วัด สู่สวรรค์	Sompot Chidgasornpongse	Thailand; France; Singapore; Norway; China; Hong Kong; Indonesia; Qatar
All the Lovers in the Night	すべて真夜中の恋人たち	Yukiko Sode	Japan; France
Ben'Imana		Marie Clémentine Dusabejambo	Rwanda; Gabon; Côte d'Ivoire; France; Norway
The Bitch Pack	Salen las lobas	Claudia Estrada Tarascó	Spain; Belgium; Denmark
Cinemanía		Marc Ferrer	Spain
Forest High	Forêt Ivre	Manon Coubia	Belgium; France
Light Pillar	寒夜灯柱	Xu Zao	China
The Swimmer	A nadadora	Sandra Sánchez	Spain; Portugal
The Waters	As augas	Ledicia Sola	Spain
Yesterday the Eye Didn't Sleep	البارح العين ما نامت	Rakan Mayasi	Belgium; Lebanon; Palestine; Saudi Arabia; Qatar

== Time of History (Tiempo de Historia) ==
The following films were selected for the 'Time of History' section:

English title	Original title	Director(s)	Production countrie(s)
Alea Jacarandas		Hassen Ferhani	Algeria, France
Cameron Winter at Carnegie Hall		Paul Thomas Anderson	United States
Gabin		Maxence Voiseux	France, Germany, Switzerland
I Deserve a Lover Whose Every Rise Sets Fiery Dooms Raging Across the Skies	Mara Ashaegh Chenan Bayad Ke Har Bari ke Barkhizad Ghiamat-haaye por Atash Ze Har Su-i Barangizad	Mani Haghighi	Iran
Imperium		Sergei Loznitsa	Germany; Italy; France; Lithuania
Into the Jaws of the Ogre	Dans la gueule de l'ogre	Mahsa Karampour	France
Letters from an Inner Exile		Eloy Enciso Cachafeiro	Spain
Life of Jorge Luis Borges	Biografía de Jorge Luis Borges	Mariano Llinás	Argentina
At Night	La Nuit	Beatrice Gibson	United Kingdom; France
The Nights	Las noches	Ana Bovino	Argentina
Once Upon a Time in Harlem		William Greaves, David Greaves	United States
Rehearsals for a Revolution		Pegah Ahangarani	Czech Republic, Spain
Thanks for Coming	Merci d'être venu	Alain Cavalier	France
Tin Castle		Alexander Murphy	France, Ireland
Truck Driver	Camionero	Francisco Marise	Spain; Argentina
Out of competition
Dear Nanni	Caro Nanni	Pablo Maqueda	Spain
Vacío luminoso		Uberto Rapisardi	Spain; France

== Alchemies (Alquimias) ==
The following films were selected for the 'Alchemies' section:

English title	Original title	Director(s)	Production countrie(s)
Benigno		David Baute	Spain
Dream of Another Summer		Irene Bartolomé	Spain; Lebanon
Farewell, Rivers	Adiós, ríos	Sebastián Uría	Spain

== Memory & Utopia (Memoria y Utopía) ==
The following films were selected for the 'Alchemies' section:

English title	Original title	Director(s)	Production countrie(s)
An Andalusian Dog	A Chien Andalou	Luis Buñuel	France
Betrayal	Løperjenten	Vibeke Lokkeberg	Norway
Destiny	المصير	Youssef Chahine	Egypt; France
Esencia de verbena		Ernesto Giménez Caballero	Spain
Fruit of Paradise	Ovoce stromů rajských jíme	Vera Chytilová	Czechoslovakia; Belgium
The Golden Age	L'Âge d'or	Luis Buñuel	France
Goya or the Hard Way to Enlightenment	Goya – oder der arge Weg der Erkenntnis	Konrad Wolf	Germany; Russia; Bulgaria; Yugoslavia
Landscape After the Battle	Krajobraz po bitwie	Andrzej Wajda	Poland
The Mirage	السراب	Ahmed Bouanani	Morocco
My 20th Century	Az én XX. századom	Ildikó Enyedi	Hungary; Germany; Cuba
Ninja Scroll	獣兵衛忍風帖	Yoshiaki Kawajiri	Japan
Noticiario de cineclub		Ernesto Giménez Caballero	Spain
Occidente y sabotaje		Ana Mariscal	Spain
The Year of the Cannibals	I cannibali	Liliana Cavani	Italy

== Constellations (Constelaciones) ==
The non-competitive 'Constellations' section includes:

English title	Original title	Director(s)	Production countrie(s)
Club Kid		Jordan Firstman	United States
Minotaur	Минотавр	Andrey Zvyagintsev	Francia; Latvia; Germany
Josephine		Beth de Araújo	United States
The Man I Love		Ira Sachs	United States; France

== Awards ==
Burton holding his honorary spike

Some of the awards presented at the festival include:

=== Official selection ===
==== Main competition jury prizes ====
The main competition jury conceded the following awards:

- Golden Spike: Dao
- Silver Spike: La Gradiva
- 'Ribera del Duero Award' for Best Director: Lisandro Alonso (Double Freedom)
- Best Actress: Alba Rohrwacher (A Good Little Soldier)
- Best Actor: Swann Arlaud (A Man of His Time)
- Best Cinematography: Olivier Boonjing (A Man of His Time)
- 'Miguel Delibes' Award for Best Screenplay: Sandra Wollner (Everytime)
- 'José Salcedo' Award for Best Editing: Guillaume Lillo (La Gradiva)
