= The Swimmer (2026 film) =

- Galician: A nadadora
- Directed by: Sandra Sánchez
- Screenplay by: Sandra Sánchez; Daniel D. García; Ana Piterbarg; Ángeles Huerta
- Produced by: Fernanda del Nido; Cristina Zumárraga
- Starring: Naria López; María de Dina; Diego Anido; Melania Cruz; Federico Pérez Rey; Lucía Veiga
- Cinematography: Gina Ferrer García
- Edited by: Sandra Sánchez
- Music by: Mercedes Peón
- Production companies: Setembro Cine; Tandem Films; Ukbar Filmes
- Release date: 26 October 2026 (Seminci)
- Countries: Spain; Portugal
- Language: Galician

The Swimmer (Galician: A nadadora) is a 2026 drama film directed by Sandra Sánchez. It is a Spanish-Portuguese co-production.

It had its world premiere at the 71st Valladolid International Film Festival in October 2026.

== Plot ==
Set in 1990s Costa da Morte, the plot follows Nico, a teenager secretly engaged in illegal gooseneck barnacle harvesting with her father, a survivor from heroin use disorder. She often loses consciousness, and starts having visions of another young woman submerged in the sea with her.

== Cast ==
- Nuria López as Nico
- María de Dina as the swimmer
- Lucía Veiga
- Federico Pérez
- Diego Anido
- Melania Cruz

== Production ==
The film is a Spanish-Portuguese co-production by Setembro Cine (Fernanda del Nido) and Tandem Films (Cristina Zumárraga) alongside Ukbar Filmes (Pandora da Cunha Telles and Pablo Iraola), with the association of Antaviana Films and the participation of TVG. Shooting locations included Camariñas.

== Release ==
Crew and cast members promoting the film at the 71st Valladolid International Film Festival

The film premiered in the 'Meeting Point' competition of the 71st Valladolid International Film Festival (Seminci) in October 2026. The theatrical release is tentatively expected for 2027.

== Reception ==
Fernando Bernal of Caimán Cuadernos de Cine pointed out that the film could be read as forming a sort of diptych with Romería in terms of the similar era represented and the shared topic about the generational toll caused by drugs, although Sánchez rather made her protagonist a woman "whose suffering and determination are reminiscent of the Dardenne brothers' Rosetta".

== See also ==
- List of Spanish films of 2027
