= Blank check (disambiguation) =

A blank cheque is a cheque with no numerical value filled in.

Blank check or blank cheque may also refer to:

- Blank Check (film), a 1994 film originally released as Blank Cheque in the United Kingdom.
- Blank Check (game show), the short-lived 1970s American game show
- Blank Check with Griffin & David, a film podcast hosted by actor Griffin Newman and The Atlantic film critic David Sims

== See also ==
- Carte Blanche (disambiguation)
