= The Fortunate Isles =

- Spanish: Las islas afortunadas
- Directed by: Helena Girón; Samuel Delgado
- Screenplay by: Helena Girón; Samuel Delgado
- Produced by: Samuel Delgado; Vicky Miha; José M. Viña; Jairo López; Jamie Weiss; Crhstine Tsakmaka
- Starring: Luisa Ahl Laabiad; Lou Castel; Grégoire Colin
- Cinematography: Jose Alayón
- Edited by: Manuel Muñoz Rivas
- Music by: Camilo Sanabria
- Production companies: El Viaje; Banda Negra; Asterisk*
- Release date: 15 September 2026 (TIFF)
- Countries: Spain; Greece
- Languages: Spanish; French; Arabic

The Fortunate Isles (Spanish: Las islas afortunadas) is a 2026 historical drama film written and directed by Helena Girón and Samuel Delgado.

== Plot ==
Set against the backdrop of water scarcity in the eastern Canary Islands, the plot takes place in the 15th century after the French-Norman conquest. Enslaved pregnant woman Fátima works for Don Gaspar, a decadent Marquis of French origin who controls the only water source in the island. After the well dries up, the disgruntled population revolts. The Marquis' son is ready to leave his decrepit father and Fátima at their peril. The converging fates of enslaved people, settlers, and survivors forcefully give birth to a new order.

== Cast ==
- Luisa Ahl Laabiad as Fátima
- Lou Castel
- Grégoire Colin

== Production ==
The film is a Spanish-Greek co-production by El Viaje, La Banda Negra, and Asterisk, and it had the support of ICAA, the Government of the Canary Islands, the Greek Film Institute, and Creative Europe MEDIA.

It was shot in Super 16 film. Shooting locations in the Canary Islands included La Graciosa, Lanzarote, and Tenerife. The cast was toplined by a non-professional actress, the Sahrawi Luisa Ahl Laabiad, also featuring Lou Castel and Grégoire Colin and a supporting cast of non-professional Canarian actors.

Post-production took place in Athens.

== Release ==
Alayón, Ahl Laabiad, Girón, Castel, Delgado, and Alberti presenting the film at the 71st Valladolid International Film Festival

The film premiered in the 'Discovery' section of the 51st Toronto International Film Festival on 15 September 2026. It was also programmed in the competition of the 71st Valladolid International Film Festival (Seminci).

== Reception ==
Alfonso Rivera of Cineuropa described the film as "a historical tableau with elements of a fable, focusing on the everyday and the familiar, the humble and the naturalistic", assessing that the "particularly complex" relationships between master and enslaved people are both "both fascinating and terrible".

== See also ==
- List of Spanish films of 2027
