= A Man on a Bridge =

- Theatrical release poster
- Spanish: Un hombre en un puente
- Directed by: David Martín de los Santos
- Written by: David Martín de los Santos
- Produced by: José Nolla; Andrés Martín; Maribel Muñoz; José Carmona; Ana Figueroa; Norma Velásquez
- Starring: Roger Casamajor; Font García; Juanfra Juárez; Nidia Bermejo; Belén Cuesta; Ruth Díaz
- Cinematography: Santiago Racaj
- Edited by: Marta Velasco
- Music by: Karin Zielinski
- Production companies: Vértigo Films; Icónica Producciones; Lanube Películas; Suena Perú
- Distributed by: Vértigo Films
- Release dates: 29 October 2026 (Seminci); 27 November 2026 (Spain)
- Running time: 117 minutes
- Countries: Spain; Peru
- Language: Spanish

A Man on a Bridge (Spanish: Un hombre en un puente) is a 2026 drama film written and directed by David Martín de los Santos starring Roger Casamajor.

== Plot ==
Andrés, a man on a mid-life crisis, returns to his hometown, crossing paths with his former girlfriend Lucía, his old friend Mariano, and his brother Chema. Meeting Liliana will upend his life.

== Production ==
- Roger Casamajor as Andrés
- Belén Cuesta as Lucía
- Juanfra Juárez as Mariano
- Font García as Chema
- Nidia Bermejo as Liliana
- Ruth Díaz
- Puchi Lagarde
- Alejandro Escamilla
- Sofía Allepuz
- Sergio Refis

== Production ==
At Ventana CineMad 2021, prior to the project entering production, the cast that was being considered at the time included Antonio de la Torre, Ruth Díaz, Manolo Solo, and Sergi López. The film was produced by Vértigo Films, Icónica, LaNube Películas, and Suena Perú and it had the participation of Canal Sur and backing from ICAA, Ayuntamiento de Madrid, the Madrid regional administration, and Junta de Andalucía. It was shot in Cervera de Pisuerga, the Madrid region, and Seville. Santiago Racaj worked as cinematographer, opting for an Arri Alexa 35 camera and Zeiss Master Prime lenses. Filming wrapped on 21 November 2025.

== Release ==
The film was presented at the 71st Valladolid International Film Festival (Seminci) on 29 October 2026. Distributed by Vértigo Films, it is scheduled to be released theatrically in Spain on 27 November 2026.

== See also ==
- List of Spanish films of 2026
