= Carte Blanche (film) =

- Theatrical release poster
- Spanish: Carta blanca
- Directed by: Gerardo Herrero
- Screenplay by: Daniel Corpas; Lorenzo Silva
- Based on: Carta blanca by Lorenzo Silva
- Produced by: Gerardo Herrero; Mariela Besuievsky
- Starring: Iván Pellicer; Víctor Clavijo; Salva Reina; Joel Bosqued; Roberto Sebazco; Almagro San Miguel; Fran Berenguer; Andrés Picazo
- Cinematography: Juan Carlos Gómez
- Edited by: Javier Laffaille
- Music by: Paula Olaz
- Production companies: Bruja del Sur Films AIE; Tornasol Media
- Distributed by: Karma Films
- Release dates: 8 November 2026 (Seville); 6 January 2027 (Spain)
- Country: Spain
- Language: Spanish

Carte Blanche (Spanish: Carta blanca) is a 2026 war thriller film directed by Gerardo Herrero based on the novel by Lorenzo Silva. It stars Iván Pellicer alongside Víctor Clavijo and Salva Reina.

== Plot ==
In 1921, young man Juan Faura joins the Spanish Legion and is deployed in the War of Morocco, seeing himself involved in Sergeant Antonio Bermejo's bloody revenge quest against Berbers after the Disaster of Annual.

== Cast ==
- Iván Pellicer as Juan Faura
- Víctor Clavijo as Antonio Bermejo
- Salva Reina as Klemper
- Joel Bosqued
- Roberto Sebazco
- Almagro San Miguel
- Fran Berenguer
- Andrés Picazo

== Production ==
The film was written by Daniel Corpas and Lorenzo Silva based on Silva's novel Carta blanca. It is a Bruja del Sur Films AIE and Tornasol Media production with the participation of RTVE, Movistar Plus+, and Canal Sur. Principal photography started on 15 August 2025. Shooting locations included the Tabernas desert and Alquife.

== Release ==
The film had its world premiere in the 'Special Screenings' section of the 23rd Seville European Film Festival on 8 November 2026. It was also selected as the opening film of the 25th Almería International Film Festival (FICAL).

Distributed by Karma Films, it is scheduled to be released theatrically in Spain on 6 January 2027.

== See also ==
- List of Spanish films of 2027
