= ElviraYuki =

Twitch streamer

- Born: 12 November 2002 (age 24); Cádiz
- Occupations: Twitch streamer; YouTuber

Instagram information
- Page: ElviraYuki
- Followers: 55.5 thousand

TikTok information
- Page: ElviraYuki
- Followers: 77.9 thousand

Twitch information
- Channel: ElviraYuki
- Years active: 2021–present
- Genre: Gaming
- Followers: 95.4 thousand

YouTube information
- Channel: ElviraYuki
- Subscribers: 25.8 thousand
- Views: 7.37 million

ElviraYuki (born 12 November 2002) is a Spanish Twitch streamer, YouTuber and content creator known for playing with her feet on a dance pad, a type of game controller used for dance games.

== Biography ==
ElviraYuki was born on 12 November 2002 in Cádiz, Spain. She studied early childhood education at the UCA but she didn't finish it and began streaming on Twitch. When she was young she played Princess Disney video games, then she played with Nintendo game consoles, and finally she played with Xbox console and PlayStation 4 until she created an account on Twitch, where she played on PlayStation 5 and PC. Throughout her life, she played video games like Pingu, Plants vs. Zombies, Animal Crossing, Pokémon, My Little Pony, Minecraft, The Sims, Red Dead Redemption or Grand Theft Auto. She currently studies acting.

== Career ==
Since she was young, she wanted to record YouTube videos, but she started when she finished bachillerato. In spite of the mockery she received because no one believed she could do it, she began doing daily live streamings in Twitch playing a variety of video games, such as the horror video game Resident Evil or Super Mario 64, and she decided to overcome From Software video games with the dance pad, beginning with Dark Souls. In this way and bit by bit, she began to be known in Spain and she was invited by Chuso to participate on Relay Race event, defeating Vicaria Amelia without receiving any hit and playing with the dance pad.

Between 2 and 16 September 2022 she faced the enemies using the dance pad, such as all the bosses of FromSoftware game Elden Ring, by Hidetaka Miyazaki: Radahn (one of the most difficult bosses), Godrick, Margit, Morgoth or Rennala or facing the fatal enemies in Dark Souls saga at level 1 or Sekiro, and other video games like Bloodborne No-Hit (without receiving a hit from a non playable character enemy). She defeated them without using any invocations and in a 4 minutes duel (the studio released a new patch increasing the damage of the attacks).

In this way, she was innovative and she became the first Spanish speaker player who defeated those bosses using the dance pad, which is more difficult because it suffers a delay when she pushes the button. She was guest to the Gamepolis 2022 in Málaga.

In January 2023 she was considered a very top streamer alongside Mouredev, Pilarsitta, Trizia_Curtis and OllieGamerz, so they appeared at Callao City Lights. On 21 February it was confirmed she will be a participant in the Twitch series Squid Craft Games 2, created by Rubius and AuronPlay, and where she was eliminated during the first game. In April she was invited to Granada Gaming Festival, which was a great success. She wasn't nominated to ESLANDs, but it was considered she had a great year, and she played Ocarina of Time and Metal Gear Solid, between others.

In January 2024 she participated on Hunt & Run, the Twitch Rivals of Minecraft battleroyale made by Illojuan. On 9 April 2024 she was chosen as finalist to represent the esports club Team Heretics alongside Alba Castelló, Jose Ortega and Totakeki. Finally, Totakeki was chosen as the winner of Red Bull Draft Heretics. In November 2024 she was a participant in the Twitch series Squid Craft Games 3.

On 9 February 2025 she was invited to a World of Warcraft event named Go Again, created by Elxokas and made for Spanish players. On 24 and 25 April 2025 she attended GEM Awards, an international video game event hold in Sevilla and it was presented by Míster Jägger. In July 2025 she became the seventh most-viewed female Spanish streamer.

Since 2025, she presents Los Awardnts, a satirical and humorous awards ceremony.
