= The Confidant (film) =

- Spanish: El confidente
- Directed by: Daniel Calparsoro
- Screenplay by: Fernando Navarro
- Starring: Javier Gutiérrez; Miguel Herrán; Itsaso Arana; Emilio Palacios; Víctor Clavijo
- Cinematography: Tommie Ferreras
- Edited by: Antonio Frutos
- Production companies: Bowfinger International Pictures; Esto También Pasará; El Confidente Films AIE; Lionceau Films
- Distributed by: Sony Pictures
- Release dates: 30 October 2026 (Seminci); 27 January 2027 (Spain)
- Countries: Spain; France
- Language: Spanish

The Confidant (Spanish: El confidente) is a 2026 thriller film directed by Daniel Calparsoro from a screenplay by Fernando Navarro. It stars Javier Gutiérrez and Miguel Herrán.

It had its world premiere at the 71st Valladolid International Film Festival in October 2026 ahead of its January 2027 theatrical release in Spain by Sony Pictures.

== Plot ==
A seasoned police officer in the counter-terrorism field (Lleida) woos a young radical (Imanol) involved in street political violence onto becoming an informer within the ETA ranks.

== Cast ==
- Javier Gutiérrez as Lleida
- Miguel Herrán as Imanol
- Itsaso Arana
- Emilio Palacios
- Víctor Clavijo
- Miguel Garcés
- Patricia Vico

== Production ==
The Confidant is the third film delivered by the Spanish film industry in a short period of time about moles among the ETA ranks, after Undercover (2024) and She Walks in Darkness (2025). Written by Fernando Navarro, the screenplay is based on the journalistic output of Pablo Muñoz. The film was produced by Bowfinger International Pictures and Esto También Pasará (also behind Undercover) alongside El Confidente Films AIE and the French outfit Lionceau Films, with the association of Sony Pictures Entertainment Iberia, and the participation of Movistar Plus+ and Atresmedia. It was shot in Gipuzkoa and Iparralde.

== Release ==
The Confidant had its world premiere at the 71st Valladolid International Film Festival (Seminci) in October 2026. It was also programmed at the 23rd Seville European Film Festival.

Distributed by Sony Pictures, it is scheduled to be released theatrically in Spain on 27 January 2027.

== See also ==
- List of Spanish films of 2027
