= Ana no =

- Directed by: Paz Vega
- Screenplay by: Paz Vega; María Delgado; David Pellón
- Based on: Ana non by Agustín Gómez Arcos
- Produced by: Marta Velasco; Paul Mateos Verdejo; Andrea Di Blasio; Luca Cabriolu
- Starring: Ángela Molina; Álvaro Morte; Rossy de Palma; Alessio Boni
- Cinematography: Diego Dussuel
- Edited by: Ana Álvarez Ossorio
- Production companies: Áralan Films; Blacklight Films; Ombre Rosse Film Production
- Distributed by: BTeam Pictures (Spain)
- Countries: Spain; Italy
- Language: Spanish

Ana no is an upcoming drama film directed by Paz Vega based on the novel Ana non by Agustín Gómez Arcos starring Ángela Molina.

It is a Spanish-Italian co-production.

== Plot ==
Set in 1968, the plot follows an old widowed woman who travels north from her tiny village in Almería to Basauri in order to meet her only living son, who has been imprisoned there for over thirty years.

== Cast ==
- Ángela Molina as Ana Paucha
- Álvaro Morte as Trinidad
- Rossy de Palma
- Alessio Boni

== Production ==
Based on a novel by Agustín Gómez Arcos originally published in French under the title Ana non, the screenplay was written by Paz Vega alongside María Delgado and David Pellón. A Spanish-Italian project produced by Áralan Films and Blacklight Films alongside Ombre Rosse Film Production, the film also had the participation of RTVE, Canal Sur, Movistar Plus, and HBO Max and funding from ICAA. The reported budget was €4.5 million. Principal photography began in Seville on 16 October 2026. Cinematographer Diego Dussuel shot Ana no in 35 mm film using an Arricam LT camera and Zeiss Master Prime Lenses. Other crew responsibilities included Ana Álvarez Ossorio (editing), Gigia Pellegrini (art direction), Jorge Marín (sound), Yolanda Piña and Félix Terrero ( makeup and hairstyles), and Marta Rodríguez (costume design).

== Release ==
BTeam Pictures secured theatrical distribution rights to the film while Film Factory acquired international sales.

== See also ==
- List of Spanish films of 2027
