= The Bitch Pack =

- Film poster
- Spanish: Salen las lobas
- Directed by: Claudia Estrada Tarascó
- Written by: Claudia Estrada Tarascó
- Produced by: Alba Sotorra Clua; Belén Sánchez Silvero; Marta Figueras Cardona
- Starring: Valeria Estrada Tarascó; Houda Marrouch Laamarti "Huda"; Vanessa Aisha Badji; Sara Martínez Martín; Rosa Boladeras; Àlex Brendemühl
- Cinematography: Constanza Sandoval
- Edited by: Sofi Escudé; Alicia Tapounet
- Music by: Spinnheli
- Production companies: Oceanika; Vampire Films; Novak Prod; Paloma Productions
- Distributed by: Silencio Cinema
- Release dates: 25 October 2026 (Seminci); 11 December 2026 (Spain)
- Countries: Spain; Belgium; Denmark
- Language: Spanish

The Bitch Pack (Spanish: Salen las lobas) is a 2026 European coming-of-age drama film directed by Claudia Estrada Tarascó (in her directorial debut).

The film premiered at the 71st Valladolid International Film Festival on 25 October 2026 ahead of its Spanish theatrical release on 11 December 2026 by Silencio Cinema.

== Plot ==
The plot explores the mishaps of teenager Luna, sent to a juvenile detention centre where she bonds with another three women, with the group developing a plan to compete at a trap music contest in Barcelona.

== Cast ==
- Valeria Estrada Tarascó as Luna
- Marrouch Laamarti "Huda" as Yanira
- Vanessa Aisha Badji as Melissa
- Sara Martínez Martín as Rocío
- Rosa Boladeras
- Àlex Brendemühl as Gonzalo, Luna's father

== Production ==
The story taps from the real-life experience of Claudia Estrada Tarascó's sister and film lead (Valeria Estrada Tarascó) in a juvie. The film is a Spanish-Belgian-Danish co-production by Oceanika alongside Vampire Films, Novak Prod and Paloma Productions. It was lensed by Constanza Sandoval.

== Release ==
Huda, Vanessa Aisha Badji, Valeria Estrada Tarascó, Sara Martínez Martín, and Claudia Estrada Tarascó attending the presentation of the film at the 2026 Seminci

MoreThan Films acquired international sales rights to the film. The film world premiered in the 'Meeting Point' competition of the 71st Valladolid International Film Festival (Seminci) on 25 October 2026. It was also programmed at the 41th Mostra de València, and at Tallin's Just Film Youth and Children's Film Festival. It is scheduled to be released theatrically in Spain on 11 December 2026 under Silencio Cinema.

== Reception ==
Alfonso Rivera of Cineuropa wrote that the film "exudes authenticity and courage while becoming a heartfelt tribute from the director not only to her own sister, but also to the teenage girls who come of age deprived of their freedom".

== Accolades ==
Valeria (left) and Claudia Estrada (right) holding the Young Seminci Award and the Meeting Point Audience Award obtained at the 2026 Seminci

Year	Award	Category	Nominee(s)	Result	Ref.
2026	71st Valladolid International Film Festival	Audience Award — Meeting Point		Won	
2026	71st Valladolid International Film Festival	Young Seminci Award		Won	
2026	71st Valladolid International Film Festival	La Meseta Distribution Award	Silencio Cinema	Won	
2026	41st Mostra de València	City of València Audience Award		Won	

== See also ==
- List of Spanish films of 2026
