= Disco, Ibiza, Locomía =

- Theatrical release poster
- Directed by: Kike Maíllo
- Written by: Kike Maíllo; Marta Libertad
- Produced by: Kiko Martínez
- Starring: Jaime Lorente; Alberto Ammann; Alejandro Speitzer; Blanca Suárez; Iván Pellicer; Pol Granch; Albert Baró; Javier Morgade
- Cinematography: Marc Miró
- Edited by: Martí Roca
- Music by: Camilla Uboldi
- Production companies: Nadie es Perfecto; La chica de la curva; Rumba Ibiza; SBD Films
- Distributed by: DeAPlaneta
- Release dates: 8 March 2024 (Málaga); 17 May 2024 (Spain)
- Countries: Spain; Mexico
- Language: Spanish

Disco, Ibiza, Locomía is a 2024 biographical drama film directed by Kike Maíllo from a screenplay by Maíllo and Marta Libertad based on the musical ensemble Locomía. Its cast is led by Jaime Lorente, Alberto Ammann, Alejandro Speitzer, and Blanca Suárez.

== Plot ==
In 1980s Spain, a group of friends interested in fashion and new to Ibiza develop a musical career upon coming across music producer José Luis Gil.

== Cast ==
- Jaime Lorente as Xavi Font
- Blanca Suárez as Lurdes Iríbar
- Alberto Ammann as José Luis Gil
- Alejandro Speitzer as Carlos
- Albert Baró as Fuentes
- Pol Granch as Jaume
- Iván Pellicer as Manolo
- Javier Morgade as Luis
- Llum Barrera
- Vito Sanz as Manuel Gil
- Eva Llorach as Nieves
- Gonzalo Ramírez as Gard

== Production ==
The film is a Nadie es Perfecto, La chica de la curva and SBD Films production. It had the participation of Atresmedia, Netflix, and TV3. Shooting locations included Tenerife and Barcelona.

== Release ==
Disco, Ibiza, Locomía premiered at the 27th Málaga Film Festival on 8 March 2024. The film was released theatrically in Spain on 17 May 2024 by DeAPlaneta. It was released on Netflix on 6 September 2024.

== Reception ==
=== Critical response ===
Javier Ocaña of El País deemed the film to be a "disaster" and a "a missed opportunity".

Martín Fernández Cruz of La Nación gave the film a 'very good' rating, assessing that Lorente "delivers a moving performance".

Andrea G. Bermejo of Cinemanía rated the film 3 out of 5 stars, underscoring in the verdict that "it does not quite do justice to Locomía's crazy story, but almost".

=== Accolades ===
Year	Award	Category	Nominee(s)	Result	Ref.
2025	39th Goya Awards	Best Costume Design	Ester Palaudàries, Vinyet Escobar	Pending	

== See also ==
- List of Spanish films of 2024
