= Girl and Wolf =

- Spanish: Chica y lobo
- Directed by: Roc Espinet
- Starring: Anna Castillo; David Verdaguer
- Music by: Arturo Cardelús
- Production companies: Hampa Studio; Sygnatia; Alesa Produccions; Boavista Filmes
- Distributed by: 39 Escalones Films
- Release dates: 14 November 2026 (FICX); 12 February 2027 (Spain)
- Running time: 85 minutes
- Countries: Spain; Portugal
- Language: Spanish

Girl and Wolf (Spanish: Chica y lobo) is a 2026 animated fantasy adventure film directed by Roc Espinet based on his own graphic novel.

It premiered at the 64th Gijón International Film Festival on 14 November 2026.

== Plot ==
Set in the middle ages, the plot follows the plight of an orphan barmaid girl who ventures into the forest and interacts with a wolf pack.

== Voice cast ==
- Anna Castillo as Paula
- David Verdaguer

== Production ==
The origins of the project date back to 2011. It was first adapted by Espinet into a graphic novel format. The film was produced by Hampa Studio, Sygnatia, Alesa Films, and Boavista Filmes with a reported budget of €4 million. The film uses 2D animation and it underwent development at the Amiga Space animation studio in Carral.

== Release ==
Latido Films was reported to have acquired international sales rights to the film in 2020. For its world premiere on 14 November 2026, the film was programmed in the 'FICX Premiere' section of the 64th Gijón International Film Festival (FICX). Distributed by 39 Escalones Films, it is scheduled to be released theatrically in Spain on 12 February 2027.

== Reception ==
M.F. Antuña of El Comercio described Girl and Wolf as a film "aimed at a teenage audience, with music that fills the whole story with magic and beauty".

== Accolades ==
Year	Award	Category	Nominee(s)	Result	Ref.
2026	17th Hollywood Music in Media Awards	Best Original Score – Independent Film (Foreign Language)	Arturo Cardelús	Nominated	

== See also ==
- List of Spanish films of 2027
