= Carte Blanche =

Carte Blanche (French, literally 'blank/white card', but figuratively 'unlimited discretionary power to act') may refer to:

- Blank cheque, a cheque with no monetary value entered, figuratively an open-ended agreement

== Arts and entertainment ==
=== Music ===
- Carte Blanche, a musical project of Riton and DJ Mehdi
- Carte Blanche (Rachid Taha album), 1997
- Carte Blanche (Phat Kat album), 2007
- Carte Blanche (DJ Snake album), 2019
- "Carte Blanche", a 1999 song by Veracocha
- "Carte Blanche", a song from the 1981 musical film Shock Treatment
- "Carte Blanche", a song by Oktobar 1864 from the 1987 album Oktobar 1864

=== Television ===
- Carte Blanche (TV series), a South African investigative journalism show
- "Carte Blanche", a 2003 episode of The Shield
- Yvette Carte-Blanche, a fictional character in 'Allo 'Allo!

=== Other uses in arts and entertainment ===
- Carte Blanche (Norwegian dance company), the Norwegian national company of contemporary dance
- Carte Blanche (novel), a 2011 James Bond novel by Jeffery Deaver
- Carte Blanche, a 1965 painting by René Magritte
- Carte Blanche (film), a 2026 Spanish war film

== Other uses ==
- Carte blanche (cards), a playing card hand with no courts
- Carte Blanche (champagne), by Louis Roederer
- Carte Blanche (credit card), by Diners Club International
- Carte Blanche (1955 NATO exercise)

== See also ==
- Tabula rasa ('blank slate'), the theory that individuals are born without built-in mental content
- Full Powers, the authority of a person to sign a treaty on behalf of a sovereign state.
- Carta blanca ('White card'), a Spanish TV programme
- Carta Blanca, a beer by Cuauhtémoc Moctezuma Brewery
- Champ Libre ('Free field'), a French publisher
