= The Mantises =

- Spanish: Las mantis
- Directed by: Dídac Gimeno
- Written by: Dídac Gimeno; Marina Velázquez
- Starring: Venecia Franco; Iván García; María Caballero; Ruth Díaz; José Luis García Pérez; Jorge Bosch
- Cinematography: Chus Lara
- Edited by: Iván Tamargo
- Production companies: MGC Marketing; El Médano Producciones; Wild Lemon Films; Motoneta Cine
- Distributed by: Silencio Cinema
- Release dates: 15 November 2026 (FICX); 2027 (Spain)
- Countries: Spain; Argentina
- Language: Spanish

The Mantises (Spanish: Las mantis) is a 2026 fantasy coming-of-age drama film directed by Dídac Gimeno and co-written by Marina Velázquez. It is a Spanish-Argentine co-production. It stars Venecia Franco.

== Plot ==
After losing her mother, young Aitana spends time with her aunt and uncle in a Summer mansion, coming across her introverted cousin Lope (obssessed with insects and ghosts) and mysterious mute woman Cecilia.

== Cast ==
- Venecia Franco as Aitana
- Iván García as Lope
- Maria Caballero as Cecilia
- Ruth Díaz as Mercedes
- José Luis García Pérez
- Jorge Bosch

== Production ==
The film was produced MGC Marketing Producción y Gestión Cultural, El Médano Producciones, and Wild Lemon Films alongside Motoneta Cine. Shooting locations in the municipality of Moratalla included the Alhárabe River. Filming also took place in Tenerife and Madrid. The film was shot on Super 16 mm movie film. The director billed the film as a "an emotional and spiritual journey towards coming to terms with loss". Regarding the visual identity of the film, the team approached the design of the house in the vein of traditional Gothic fantasy, taking inspiration from Hammer films, and using as well day for night shooting techniques.

== Release ==
The film premiered in the 'Retueyos' section of the Gijón International Film Festival (FICX) on 15 November 2026. It was also programmed at the Madrid-based Rizoma Festival. Distributed by Silencio Cinema in Spain, it is expected to be received a commercial release in 2027.

== Reception ==
Alfonso Rivera of Cineuropa wrote that the "film alternates between the harshest reality and the fantasy world into which its very young characters begin to venture, just like in Tobacco Barns by Granada-born Rocío Mesa".

M.F. Antuña of El Comercio considered that Caballero nails her "singularly complex role" as a mute but hearing woman.

== See also ==
- List of Spanish films of 2027
