= As Neves (film) =

- Film poster
- Directed by: Sonia Méndez
- Written by: Sonia Méndez
- Produced by: Pedro Hernández Santos; Nati Juncal Portas
- Starring: Andrea Varela; David Rodríguez Fernández; Antía Mariño; Xacobe Bruña Alonso; Irene Rodríguez Vence; Diego Caro; Santi Carmena Rico; Jenny Soto Romarís; Adriana Fernández Pazó; Lucía Veiga
- Cinematography: Lucía C. Pan
- Edited by: Juliana Montañés
- Music by: Andy Bell
- Production companies: Cósmica Producións; Aquí y Allí Films
- Distributed by: Sideral
- Release dates: 6 March 2024 (Málaga); 10 May 2024 (Spain)
- Country: Spain
- Language: Galician
- Box office: €71,989

As Neves is a 2024 Spanish teen thriller film written and directed by Sonia Méndez. It is shot in Galician.

== Plot ==
Set in a fictional Galician village in the mountains of the province of Lugo (As Neves) at a time of physical isolation of the village caused by a strong snowfall, the plot follows a group of teenagers missing Paula, a girl who disappeared during a night of shroom abuse.

== Cast ==
- Andrea Varela as Erea
- David Rodríguez as Manu
- Antía Mariño as Paula
- Xacobe Bruña as Diego
- Irene Rodríguez as Sabela
- Diego Caro as Óscar
- Santi Carmena
- Jennifer Soto as Paloma
- Adriana Fernández as Bea
- Lucía Veiga as Portas

== Production ==
As Neves is a Cósmica Producións and Aquí y Allí Films production, with the participation of TVG and the backing from ICAA and AGADIC. Shooting locations included Fonsagrada.

== Release ==
The film was presented at the 27th Málaga Film Festival on 6 March 2024. Distributed by Sideral, it was released theatrically in Spain on 10 May 2024.

== Reception ==
Jonathan Holland of ScreenDaily deemed the film to be "a sharp-eyed but compassionate piece".

Sergi Sánchez of La Razón rated the film 3½ out of 5 stars, highlighting the respect for the emotions of teenagers as the best thing about the film.

== Accolades ==
Year	Award	Category	Nominee(s)	Result	Ref.
2025	23rd Mestre Mateo Awards	Best Film		Won	
2025	23rd Mestre Mateo Awards	Best Director	Sonia Méndez	Nominated	
2025	23rd Mestre Mateo Awards	Best Actress	Andrea Varela	Nominated	
2025	23rd Mestre Mateo Awards	Best Supporting Actress	Lucía Veiga	Won	
2025	23rd Mestre Mateo Awards	Best Screenplay	Sonia Méndez	Nominated	
2025	23rd Mestre Mateo Awards	Best Art Direction	Elia Robles	Nominated	
2025	23rd Mestre Mateo Awards	Best Cinematography	Lucía C. Pan	Nominated	
2025	23rd Mestre Mateo Awards	Best Production Supervision	Nati Juncal, Silvia Fuentes	Nominated	
2025	23rd Mestre Mateo Awards	Best Makeup and Hairstyles	Sonia García	Nominated	
2025	23rd Mestre Mateo Awards	Best Editing	Juliana Montañés	Nominated	
2025	23rd Mestre Mateo Awards	Best Original Music	Andy Bell	Nominated	
2025	23rd Mestre Mateo Awards	Best Sound	David Machado, Javier Pato, Daniel Fernández	Won	
2025	23rd Mestre Mateo Awards	Best Costume Design	María Porto	Nominated	

== See also ==
- List of Spanish films of 2024
