= Tiroteo =

2021 song by Marc Seguí and Pol Granch

Single by Marc Seguí and Pol Granch

from the EP Thermo Mix
- Language: Spanish
- English title: "Shooting"
- Released: January 14, 2021
- Genre: Indie pop
- Length: 4:26
- Label: Warner Spain
- Songwriters: Pol Granch; Marc Seguí; Xavibo
- Producer: Andrés Goiburu

Marc Seguí singles chronology
"Agoraphobia" (2020)	"Tiroteo" (2021)	"Verdadero" (2021)

Pol Granch singles chronology
"Millonario" (2020)	"Tiroteo" (2021)	"No Pegamos" (2021)

Music video
- "Tiroteo" on YouTube

"Tiroteo" (transl. "Shootout") is a song recorded by Spanish singer Marc Seguí and Spanish-French singer Pol Granch for Seguí's debut extended play, Thermo Mix (2021). It was written by Granch, Seguí, and Xavibo, while the production was handled by Andrés Goiburu. The song was released for digital download and streaming by Warner Music Spain on January 14, 2021, as the second single from the EP. A Spanish language indie pop and lo-fi song, it portrays a modern story of heartbreak, with a touch of humor, in which the two men find themselves involved with the same girl. The song became a local sleeper hit in Spain, reaching the top five in the country. An accompanying music video, released simultaneously with the song, was directed by Phoski films. It depicts influencer Katia Gutiérrez-Colomer as a girl with whom the two artists are in love in a fictional story.

A remix of "Tiroteo" with Puerto Rican singer Rauw Alejandro was released on April 1, 2021. Featuring elements of indie pop and new pop, Kenobi, Goiburu, Alejandro, Colla, and Kofi bae joined the original version's lyricists to write the remix version. The track received widely positive reviews from music critics, who complimented its rhythm and the combination of the singers' vocals. It won the award for Song of the Year at the 2022 Premios Odeón. The remix was commercially successful, reaching number one in Paraguay, as well as the top five in several other countries, such as Peru and Spain. It has received several certifications, including septuple platinum in Spain and quadruple platinum in Mexico. The accompanying music video for "Tiroteo (Remix)", released simultaneously with the song, was filmed in Medellín, Colombia, and directed by Gus. The colorful visual won the award for Best Music Video at the 2022 Premios Odeón.

== Background and release ==
We did the original song in quarantine and when I started doing it, I already told Xavi that I was doing something that I really liked. We made a video call and when we finished it we realized that this theme had something. Artists create many songs, but there is always one that makes them say: "Okay, this is it". I asked Pol Granch if he wanted to collaborate on the song and he agreed. We released it and it worked well.

— Marc Seguí on recording "Tiroteo".

On November 12, 2020, Marc Seguí announced that his debut extended play would be titled Thermo Mix and shared its artwork and track list on social media. "UH" and "Tiroteo" were listed as the first two tracks on the track list, while it was mentioned that "Tiroteo" would be a collaboration with Pol Granch. Two weeks later, Seguí released "UH" as the lead single from the EP. On January 14, 2021, "Tiroteo" was released for digital download and streaming by Warner Music Spain as the second single from Thermo Mix. It was included as the second track on the EP, released March 19, 2021.

== Music and lyrics ==
Musically, "Tiroteo" is a Spanish language Indie pop and lo-fi song, written by Granch, Seguí, and Xavibo. Its production was handled by Andrés Goiburu, and the track runs for a total of 4 minutes and 26 seconds. Lyrically, "Tiroteo" which translates to "Shootout" in English, tells a 21st-century story of heartbreak, with a touch of humor, in which the two men find themselves involved with the same girl. The lyrics include, "Me he cortado el pelo, me he comprado otro tinte / Buscando a ver si encuentro alguna como tú en Tinder" (I have cut my hair, I have bought another dye / Looking to see if I find someone like you on Tinder).

== Reception and promotion ==
"Tiroteo" became a local sleeper hit in Spain. It debuted at number 59 on Spain's El portal de Música chart on April 11, 2021. The song subsequently peaked at number five on May 16, 2021. It was also certified gold by the Productores de Música de España (PROMUSICAE), for track-equivalent sales of over 20,000 units in the country.

An accompanying music video was released simultaneously with the song. The visual was directed by Phoski films. It depicts influencer Katia Gutiérrez-Colomer as a girl with whom the two artists are in love in a fictional story, and who becomes the perfect target of a bullet in the shape of a flower. Jimena Garrido from Los 40 described the video as "colorful" and "brilliant".

== Remix ==
"Tiroteo (Remix)"

Single by Marc Seguí, Rauw Alejandro and Pol Granch
- Language: Spanish
- Released: April 1, 2021
- Genre: Indie pop; new pop
- Length: 5:21
- Label: Warner Latina
- Songwriters: Jorge E. Pizarro; Andres Goiburu; Raul A. Ocasio Ruiz; Jose M Collazo; Kofi bae; Marc Segui; Pol Granch; Xavibo
- Producer: Andrés Goiburu

Rauw Alejandro singles chronology
"Poderosa" (2021)	"Tiroteo (Remix)" (2021)	"Todo de Ti" (2021)

Music video
- "Tiroteo Remix" on YouTube

On January 23, 2021, Rauw Alejandro tweeted a part of the song's lyrics on his Twitter account: "Muero cuando te vas... / Toco el cielo si estás... 🎶🎶". Two days later, he sent Seguí a direct message on Instagram and said he had fallen in love with the song. He asked him if he was planning to do a remix, he wanted to join him. On March 29, 2021, Alejandro hinted that the remix would be out "really soon". It was released for digital download and streaming by Warner Music Latina on April 1, 2021. During an interview with Crónica Global, Seguí appreciated the opportunity Alejandro gave him on the remix: "Rauw Alejandro gave me his hand and helped me up, and I am very grateful to him. The theme has worked more than we all thought and I appreciate it, I'm very happy." Kenobi, Goiburu, Alejandro, Colla, and Kofi bae joined the original version's lyricists to write the remix version. The version features elements of indie pop and new pop, and runs for a total of 5 minutes and 21 seconds.

=== Critical reception ===
Upon release, "Tiroteo (Remix)" was met with widely positive reviews from music critics. José Enrique Castaño from Okdiario gave the remix a positive review, saying it "maintains its initial features without losing an iota of its essence", despite adding Alejandro, "a romantic touch", and "dynamism" to it. He called the singers "three versatile artists" and noted that Alejandro is "a great leap for the careers of the two young national artists, since they can achieve great international visibility in a short time". An author of Metro Puerto Rico praised the song for "the incredible fusion of the voices of the three artists", naming it "the best version of this song that comes ready to steal our attention". They continued complimenting it as "an explosive song, destined to leave no one indifferent, since it has all the essential ingredients", described it as "an original hit", performed by singers "who combine perfectly". Also Billboard Argentina staff wrote Seguí, Alejandro, and Granch "give rhythm" to the remix, labeling it "the best version of the single". In 2022, Ernesto Lechner from Rolling Stone ranked the track as the Alejandro's eleventh-best song.

=== Accolades ===
"Tiroteo (Remix)" was nominated for Best Pop Song and won the award for Song of the Year at the 2022 Premios Odeón. It was also nominated for Remix of the Year at the 2022 Premios Tu Música Urbano.

=== Commercial performance ===
"Tiroteo (Remix)" became a global hit. In Spain's official weekly chart, the song peaked at number four on July 4, 2021. It finished 2021 as the third-biggest hit on the country's year-end chart. In 2024, the track was certified octuple platinum by the Productores de Música de España (PROMUSICAE), for track-equivalent sales of over 480,000 units in the country. In Latin America, "Tiroteo (Remix)" experienced moderate commercial success, reaching number one in Paraguay. It also peaked in the top 10 of Ecuador, El Salvador, Mexico, and Peru. In Argentina, Costa Rica, and Nicaragua, the song reached the top 20. In Mexico, the remix was certified quadruple platinum by the Asociación Mexicana de Productores de Fonogramas y Videogramas (AMPROFON), for track-equivalent sales of over 560,000 units. Also in the United States, it was certified Latin platinum by the Recording Industry Association of America (RIAA), for track-equivalent sales of over 60,000 units in the region.

=== Music video ===
A screenshot from the music video, depicting Alejandro mopping the floor in a colorful room full of flowers, emoji cushions, and rainbows.

An accompanying music video was released simultaneously with the song. The visual was filmed in Medellín, Colombia, and directed by Venezuelan director Gus, who had also directed the videos for Alejandro's previous singles "Fantasías", "Fantasías (Remix)", "Elegí", "Ponte Pa' Mí", "Tattoo (Remix)", "Elegí (Remix)", "Enchule", "Reloj", and "De Cora <3" "Tiroteo (Remix)" music video features emoji cushions, the sun, rainbows, and multicolored garments and spaces. An author of Telecinco described the video as "spectacular", while Billboard Argentina staff stated: "True to its essence, it maintains both its theme and its casual and colorful essence, and includes subtle variants." It was nominated for Music Video of the Year at the 2021 E40 Music Awards, Video of the Year – New Artist at the 2022 Premios Tu Música Urbano, and won the award for Best Music Video at the 2022 Premios Odeón.

=== Live performances ===
"Tiroteo (Remix)" was included on the set lists for Alejandro's the Vice Versa Tour and the Saturno World Tour.

== Track listings ==
Digital download / streaming
No.	Title	Length
1.	"Tiroteo"	4:26

Digital download / streaming
No.	Title	Length
1.	"Tiroteo (Remix)"	5:21

== Credits and personnel ==
=== Original version ===
Credits adapted from Tidal.

- Marc Seguí – vocals, writer
- Pol Granch – vocals, writer
- Andrés Goiburu – producer, composer
- Xavibo – writer
- Kofi bae – composer
- Alex Ferrer – masterer, mixer

=== Remix version ===
Credits adapted from Tidal.

- Marc Seguí – vocals, writer
- Rauw Alejandro – vocals, writer
- Pol Granch – vocals, writer
- Andrés Goiburu – producer, writer
- Xavibo – writer
- Jorge E. Pizarro – writer
- Jose M Collazo – writer
- Kofi bae – writer
- Alex Ferrer – mastering engineer, mixer engineer
- Txema Rosique – A&R direction
- Daniela Rodriguez – A&R manager
- Araoz – A&R manager

== Charts ==
=== Weekly charts ===
Weekly peak performance for "Tiroteo"
Chart (2021)	Peak position
Spain (PROMUSICAE)	5

Weekly peak performance for "Tiroteo (Remix)"
Chart (2021–2023)	Peak position
Argentina Hot 100 (Billboard)	12
Chile Pop (Monitor Latino)	5
Costa Rica (Monitor Latino)	18
Ecuador (Monitor Latino)	9
El Salvador (Monitor Latino)	4
Global 200 (Billboard)	63
Guatemala Pop (Monitor Latino)	18
Honduras Pop (Monitor Latino)	4
Mexico Airplay (Billboard)	39
Mexico Streaming (AMPROFON)	10
Nicaragua (Monitor Latino)	12
Panama Pop (Monitor Latino)	8
Paraguay (Monitor Latino)	2
Peru (Monitor Latino)	2
Peru Songs (Billboard) (Note: The Hits of the World charts were launched in February 2022. Therefore, "Tiroteo (Remix)" did not have a full run on the chart.)	10
Spain (PROMUSICAE)	4
Venezuela Pop (Monitor Latino)	8

=== Monthly charts ===
Monthly chart position for "Tiroteo (Remix)"
Chart (2021–2022)	Peak position
Paraguay (SGP)	1

=== Year-end charts ===
2021 year-end chart performance for "Tiroteo (Remix)"
Chart (2021)	Position
Argentina (Monitor Latino)	63
Chile Pop (Monitor Latino)	45
Dominican Republic Pop (Monitor Latino)	18
Ecuador (Monitor Latino)	34
El Salvador (Monitor Latino)	45
Honduras Pop (Monitor Latino)	16
Mexico Pop (Monitor Latino)	30
Nicaragua Pop (Monitor Latino)	18
Panama Pop (Monitor Latino)	66
Paraguay (Monitor Latino)	31
Peru (Monitor Latino)	35
Spain (PROMUSICAE)	3
Venezuela Pop (Monitor Latino)	40

2022 year-end chart performance for "Tiroteo (Remix)"
Chart (2022)	Position
Argentina (Monitor Latino)	67
Dominican Republic Pop (Monitor Latino)	44
Ecuador (Monitor Latino)	31
El Salvador (Monitor Latino)	47
Guatemala Pop (Monitor Latino)	85
Honduras Pop (Monitor Latino)	30
Nicaragua (Monitor Latino)	47
Panama Pop (Monitor Latino)	47
Paraguay (Monitor Latino)	20
Peru (Monitor Latino)	24
Spain (PROMUSICAE)	52
Venezuela Pop (Monitor Latino)	55

2023 year-end chart performance for "Tiroteo (Remix)"
Chart (2023)	Position
Dominican Republic Pop (Monitor Latino)	99
Honduras Pop (Monitor Latino)	54
Nicaragua Pop (Monitor Latino)	44
Peru Pop (Monitor Latino)	9

== Certifications ==
Certifications and sales for "Tiroteo"
Region	Certification	Certified units/sales
Mexico (AMPROFON) Remix version with Rauw Alejandro	4× Platinum	560,000^{‡}
Peru Remix version with Rauw Alejandro	2× Platinum	
Spain (Promusicae)	Gold	20,000^{‡}
Spain (Promusicae) Remix version with Rauw Alejandro	9× Platinum	540,000^{‡}
United States (RIAA) Remix version with Rauw Alejandro	Platinum (Latin)	60,000^{‡}
^{‡} Sales+streaming figures based on certification alone.

== Release history ==
Release dates and formats for "Tattoo"
Region	Date	Format	Version	Label	Ref(s)
Various	January 14, 2021	Digital download; streaming	Original	Warner Music Spain	
Various	April 1, 2021	Digital download; streaming	Remix	Warner Music Latina	
Latin America	April 2, 2021	Contemporary hit radio	Remix	Warner Music Latina	

== See also ==
- List of best-selling singles in Spain
