= Lorenzo Silva =

Spanish award-winning writer (born 1966)

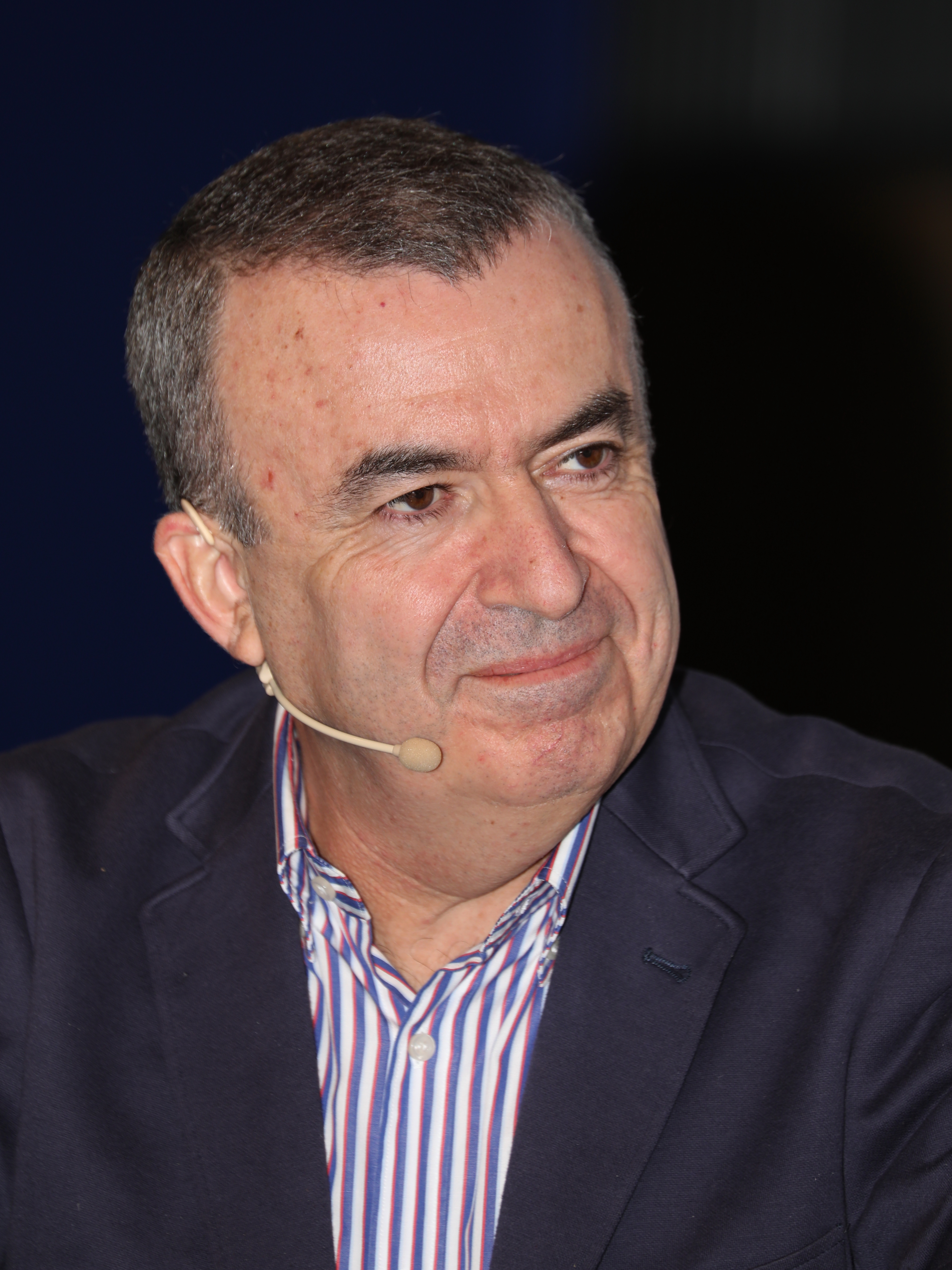
Image of Lorenzo Silva

Lorenzo Manuel Silva Amador (born 7 June 1966 in Carabanchel, Madrid) is a Spanish award-winning writer. After earning a law degree at the Universidad Complutense of Madrid, he worked as a lawyer from 1992 to 2002.

He has written stories, articles and literary essays, but he is recognised primarily for his novels. One such novel, El alquimista impaciente, won the Nadal Prize in 2000, and has been filmed by the director Patricia Ferrera, premiering in 2002. This is the second novel in which two of his best known characters, the Guardia Civil agents Sergeant Bevilacqua and Corporal Chamorro, make an appearance. Another of his novels, La flaqueza del bolchevique, was the runner-up for the prize in 1997, and has been adapted into a movie by Manuel Martín Cuenca. The same novel was translated into English in 2013 with the title The Faint-Hearted Bolshevik.

In 2001, Silva conducted an interactive experiment of novel-writing through the website of Círculo de Lectores, in which he proposed for each chapter three possible endings that were put to popular vote. The experiment was a success, and the resulting novel, La isla del fin de la suerte, was published in traditional format.

In October 2012, he was awarded the Premio Planeta de Novela for La Marca del meridiano.

== Works ==
=== Novels ===
- Noviembre sin violetas. Celesa. 2003 [1995]. ISBN 978-8423337989.
- La sustancia interior. Booket. 2004 [1996]. ISBN 978-8423335831.
- La flaqueza del bolchevique. Destino. 2010 [1997]. ISBN 978-8423342471. Translated into English in 2013 by Nick Caistor and Isabelle Kaufeler with the title The Faint-hearted Bolshevik. Hispabooks. 2013. ISBN 978-8494094828.
- El lejano país de los estanques. Destino. 2007 [1998]. ISBN 978-8423339907. First volume in the Bevilacqua series
- El ángel oculto. Destino. 2004 [1999]. ISBN 978-8423334995.
- El urinario. Pre-Textos. 1999. ISBN 978-8481912760.
- El alquimista impaciente. Destino. 2011 [2000]. ISBN 978-8423344260. Second volume in the Bevilacqua series
- El nombre de los nuestros. Destino. 2001. ISBN 978-8423333073.
- La isla del fin de la suerte. Destino. 2011 [2001]. ISBN 978-8423343287.
- La niebla y la doncella. Destino. 2002. ISBN 978-8423334438. Third volume in the Bevilacqua series
- Carta blanca. Espasa-Calpa. 2002. ISBN 978-8467014105.
- Nadie vale más que otro: Cuatro asuntos de Bevilacqua. Destino. 2004. ISBN 978-8423336685. Fourth volume in the Bevilacqua series
- La reina sin espejo. Planeta. 2005. ISBN 978-8423337750. Fifth volume in the Bevilacqua series
- Muerte en el "reality show". Rey Lear. 2007. ISBN 978-8493553159.
- El blog del inquisidor. Destino. 2008. ISBN 978-8423340996.
- La estrategia del agua. Circulo de Lectores. 2010. ISBN 978-8467240511. Sixth volume in the Bevilacqua series
- Niños feroces. Booket. 2011. ISBN 978-8423327966.
- La marca del meridiano. Planeta. 2012. Seventh volume in the Bevilacqua series.
- Los cuerpos extraños. Destino. 2014. Eighth volume in the Bevilacqua series.
- Música para feos. Destino. 2015.
- Donde los escorpiones. Destino. 2016. Ninth volume in the Bevilacqua series.
- Nada sucio. Menoscuarto. 2016. In collaboration with Noemí Trujillo.
- Recordarán tu nombre. Destino. 2017.
- Lejos del corazón. Destino. 2018. Eleventh volume in the Bevilacqua series.
- Si esto es una mujer. Destino. 2019. 1st novel with inspector Manuela Mauri. In collaboration with Noemí Trujillo.
- El mal de Corcira. Destino. 2020. Twelfth volume in the Bevilacqua series.
- Y te irás de aquí. Destino. 2020. Under the pseudonym Patricia .
- Castellano. Destino. 2021.
- La llama de Focea. Destino. 2022. Thirteenth volume in the Bevilacqua series.
- La forja de una rebelde. Destino. 2022. 2nd novel with inspector Manuela Mauri. In collaboration with Noemí Trujillo.
- Púa. Destino. 2023.
- La innombrable. Destino. 2024. 3rd novel with inspector Manuela Mauri. In collaboration with Noemí Trujillo.

=== Short stories ===
- El hombre que destruía las ilusiones de los niños. Tagus. 2013. 21 short stories.
- Historia de una piltrafa. Turpial. 2014. 3 short stories.
- Todo por amor. Destino. 2016. 103 short stories.
- Tantos lobos. Destino. 2017. 4 short stories.
- Una pésima idea. 2021.
- Nadie por delante. Destino. 2022. 42 short stories.

=== Non-fiction ===
- Viajes escritos y escritos viajeros. Anaya. 2000. ISBN 978-8420700229.
- Del Rif al Yebala: Viaje al sueño y la pesadilla de Marruecos. Destino. 2001. ISBN 978-8423333349.
- Líneas de sombra: Historias de criminales y policías. Destino. 2005. ISBN 978-8423337149.
- En tierra extraña, en tierra propia: Anotaciones de viaje. La esfera de los libros. 2006. ISBN 978-8497344357.
- Y al final, la guerra: La aventura de los soldados españoles en Irak. With Luis Miguel Francisco. La esfera de los libros. 2006. ISBN 978-8497345514.
- El Derecho en la obra de Kafka. Rey Lear. 2008. ISBN 978-8492403028.
- La flaqueza del bolchevique. With Manuel Martín Cuenca. Screenplay and other texts. Lagartos de Cine. 2008.
- Sereno en el peligro: La aventura histórica de la Guardia Civil. Editorial Edaf. 2012 [2010]. ISBN 978-8441426436.
- Los trabajos y los días. Libros.com. 2012.

=== Children's and young adult fiction ===
- Algún día, cuando pueda llevarte a Varsovia. Anaya. 2001 [1997]. ISBN 978-8420782904.
- El cazador del desierto. Anaya. 1998. ISBN 978-8420789897.
- La lluvia de París. Anaya. 2001 [2000]. ISBN 978-8420739489.
- Laura y el corazón de las cosas. Planetalector. 2012 [2002]. ISBN 978-8408111597.
- Los amores lunáticos. Anaya. 2007 [2002]. ISBN 978-8466762663.
- Pablo y los malos. With Violeta Monreal. Planeta de Libros. 2006. ISBN 978-8408066910.
- La isla del tesoro. Adapted from R. L. Stevenson's Treasure Island. Edaf. 2007.
- Mi primer libro sobre Albéniz. Anaya. 2008. ISBN 978-8466778442.
- Albéniz, el pianista aventurero. Anaya. 2008. ISBN 978-8466778459.
- El videojuego al revés. San Pablo. 2009. ISBN 978-8428535151.

== Honours ==
- La flaqueza del bolchevique - Short-listed for the Premio Nadal, 1997.
- El lejano país de los estanques - Winner of El Ojo Crítico, 1998.
- El alquimista impaciente - Winner of the Premio Nadal, 2000.
- Laura y el corazón de las cosas - Winner of the Premio Destino Infantil-Apel·les Mestres, 2002.
- Carta blanca - Winner of Premio Primavera de Novela, 2004.
- Sereno en el peligro - Winner of Premio Algaba de Ensayo, 2010.
- La marca del meridiano - Winner of Premio Planeta de Novela, 2012.
