= Pol Granch =

Spanish-French singer

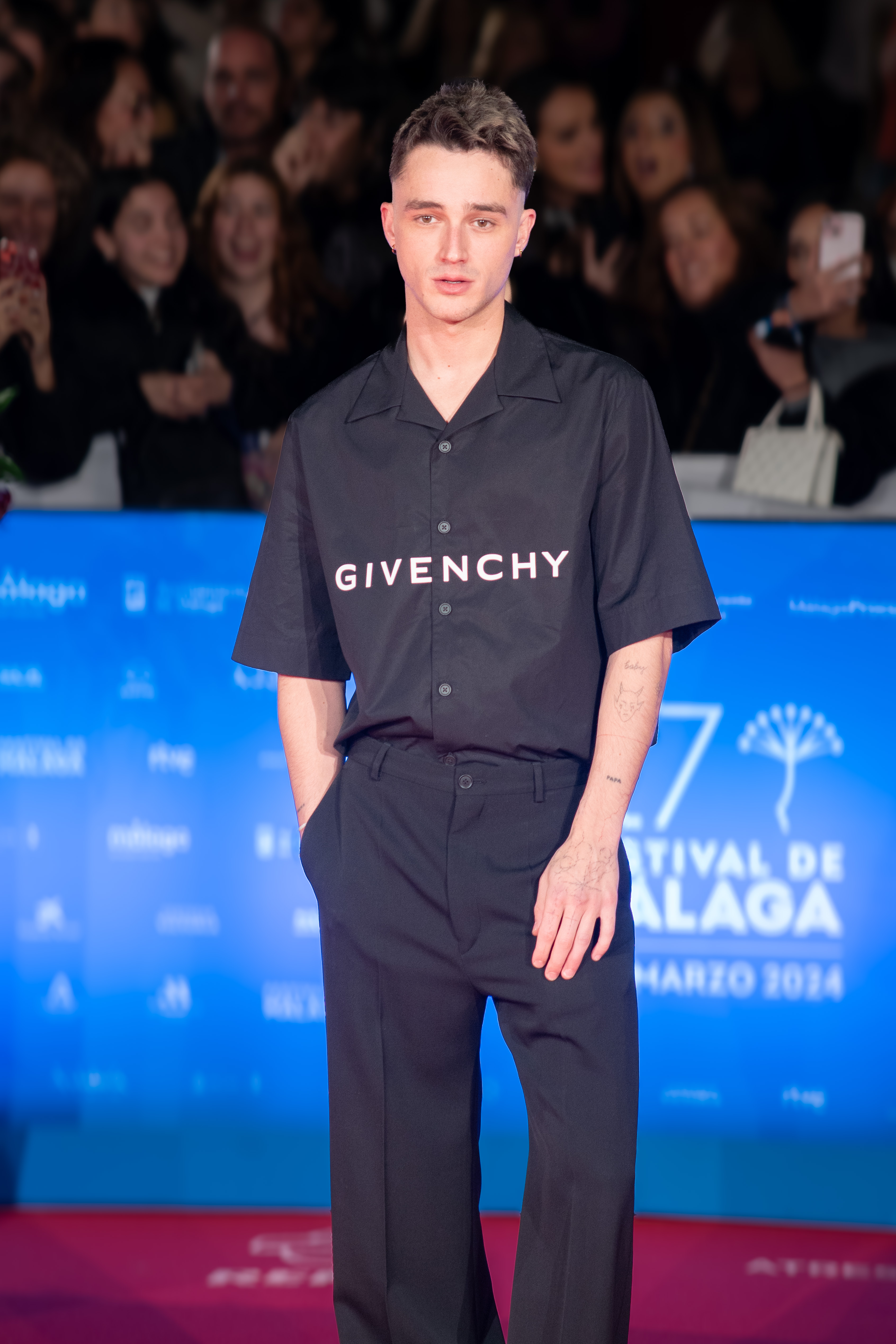
- Granch in 2024

Background information
- Born: Pablo Grandjean Sáenz; 4 April 1998 (age 28); Madrid, Spain
- Genres: Pop; R&B
- Occupations: Singer; songwriter; actor

Pablo Grandjean Sáenz, better known as Pol Granch (4 April 1998), is a Spanish-French singer-songwriter and actor. He first gained attention as the winner of the third season of Factor X España in 2018. He later gained international recognition for playing the character of Phillipe in the Netflix teen dramas Elite and Elite: Short Stories.

== Career ==
In 2018, Granch won the third season of the talent contest Factor X España. During the contest, he competed in Laura Pausini's team, performing songs including "El Sitio De Mi Recreo" by Antonio Vega, "Pausa" by Izal, and "La Quiero A Morir" by Francis Cabrel.

In 2019, his first solo single, "Late", was released along with its music video. It was at this moment he began balancing his music career with songwriting and recording projects. His first EP, self-titled, was released on April 26, 2019. In August, he released the single "Te Quiodio".

In March 2020, he released the song "Millonario" and began teasing his debut studio album. The album's lead single, "Tengo Que Calmarme", was released in May. The full album of the same name was released on June 26, 2020. The same year, it was announced that he was jumping into acting, starring as Phillipe, a French prince, in the fourth season of the Spanish Netflix series Élite. The season was released on June 18, 2021.

In 2021, Granch released the single "Tiroteo", featuring Spanish singer Marc Seguí, and a remix featuring Puerto Rican singer Rauw Alejandro. The remix became a sleeper hit and went platinum in multiple countries. He later released the singles "No Pegamos" and "Lüky Charm".

Granch released multiple singles in anticipation for this second studio album, including "De Colegio", "No Te Bastó, Mi Corazón", "Solo X Ti", 'Platicamos" featuring Mexican singer Leon Leiden and "Nena". The album, titled Amor Escupido, was released on October 28, 2022. He released a music video for the single "Que Todo Sea Probar" to coincide with the album's release.

In August 2023, he released a remix of "Solo X Ti" with Spanish singer Abraham Mateo. In 2024, Granch made his film debut in the biographical drama Disco, Ibiza, Locomía, where he portrays Jaume, a fictional member of the Spanish pop group Locomía. The same year, he released the singles "Gigante" in March, "Titiritar" in May, and "Fotomatón" in July. In September, he collaborated with Puerto Rican singer Gale for the song "Tarantino", inspired by American filmmaker Quentin Tarantino. The following month, he released his third studio album Experimento 0150.

In 2025, he appeared in the romantic comedy film Me Has Robado El Corazón. He released the song "Dimelo" as a part of the movie's soundtrack.

== Discography ==
=== Studio albums ===
Title	Details
Tengo Que Calmarme	Released: June 26, 2020; Label: Sony Music Entertainment Spain; Format: CD, digital download, streaming
Amor Escupido	Released: October 28, 2022; Label: Sony Music Entertainment Spain; Format: CD, digital download, streaming
Experimento 0150	Released: October 18, 2024; Label: Sony Music Entertainment Spain; Format: Digital download, streaming

=== EP ===
Title	Details
Pol Granch	Released: April 26, 2019; Label: Sony Music Entertainment Spain; Format: digital download, streaming

=== Singles ===
==== As lead artist ====
List of singles as lead artist, with selected chart positions, showing year released and album name
Title	Year	Peaks				Certifications	Album
Title	Year	SPA	ARG	MEX	PAR	Certifications	Album
"Late"	2019	—	—	—	—		Pol Granch
"Perdón por las horas"	2019	—	—	—	—		Pol Granch
"Desastre"	2019	—	—	—	—		Pol Granch
"Te Quiodio"	2019	—	—	—	—		Tengo que calmarme
"M conformo"	2019	—	—	—	—		Tengo que calmarme
"En llamas" (featuring Natalia Lacunza)	2020	91	—	—	—		Tengo que calmarme
"Millonario"	2020	—	—	—	—		Tengo que calmarme
"Tengo que calmarme"	2020	—	—	—	—		Tengo que calmarme
"Chocolatito"	2020	—	—	—	—		Tengo que calmarme
"Tiroteo" (with Marc Seguí)	2021	5	—	—	—	PROMUSICAE: Gold	Thermo Mix
"No pegamos"	2021	22	—	—	—		Amor Escupido
"Tiroteo (Remix)" (with Marc Seguí and Rauw Alejandro)	2021	4	12	39	1	PROMUSICAE: 5× Platinum; RIAA: Platinum (Latin)	Non-album single
"Lüky Charm"	2021	—	—	—	82		Amor Escupido
"De Colegio"	2021	—	—	—	—		Amor Escupido
"Kriño"	2022	—	—	—	—		Amor Escupido
"No Te Bastó, Mi Corazón"	2022	—	—	—	—		Amor Escupido
"Solo X Ti"	2022	—	—	—	—		Amor Escupido
"Platicamos" (with Leon Leiden)	2022	—	—	—	—		Amor Escupido
"Nena"	2022	—	—	—	—		Amor Escupido
"Que Todo Sea Probar"	2022	—	—	—	—		Amor Escupido
"Solo X Ti (Remix)" (with Abraham Mateo)	2023	—	—	—	—		Non-album single
"Cuando Salto Me Duele"	2023	—	—	—	—		Experimento 0150
“tiroteAo”	2023	—	—	—	—		Experimento 0150
"Gigante"	2024	—	—	—	—		Experimento 0150
"Titiritar"	2024	—	—	—	—		Experimento 0150
"Fotomatón"	2024	—	—	—	—		Experimento 0150
"Tarantino" (ft. Gale)	2024	—	—	—	—		Experimento 0150
"Dimelo"	2025	—	—	—	—		Non-album single
"—" denotes a recording that did not chart or was not released in that territory.

As featured artist

Title	Year	Album
"Cuando me mirabas" (Soge Culebra feat. Walls & Pol Granch)	2020	Non-album single
"Colores" (Paris Boy feat. Pol Granch)	2022	Non-album single
"Guerra Fria" (Matt Hunter, Yorghaki feat. Pol Granch)	2022	Non-album single

== Filmography ==
=== Television ===
Year	Title	Role	Notes	Ref.
2018	Factor X España	Himself – Contest	Season 3, winner	
2021–2022	Elite	Phillipe Florian von Triesenberg	Main cast (seasons 4–5); 16 episodes	
2021	Elite Short Stories: Phillipe, Caye & Felipe	Phillipe Florian von Triesenberg	Main cast; 3 episodes	

=== Film ===
Year	Title	Role	Notes	Ref.
2024	Disco, Ibiza, Locomia	Jaume		
2025	Me Has Robado El Corazón	Luiso		

== Awards and nominations ==
=== Results ===
Year	Award	Category	Work	Result	Ref.
2022	LOS40 Music Awards	Best Video	De colegio	Nominated	
2022	Latin Grammy Awards	Best New Artist	Himself	Nominated	

== Publications ==
- Granch, Pol (May 23, 2019). Cuatro notas y una guitarra. Spain: Ediciones B. p. 128. ISBN 978-84-17424-58-9.
