= Cuac FM =

- A Coruña; Spain
- Broadcast area: Galicia
- Frequency: 103.4 MHz

Programming
- Languages: Galician and Spanish
- Format: Community radio
- Affiliations: AMARC, ReMC, ReGarLiC

Ownership
- Owner: Colectivo de Universitarios Activos

Links
- Webcast: Listening Cuac FM
- Website: http://www.cuacfm.org/

Cuac FM is a community radio station that began broadcasting in 1996 on 103.4 FM in A Coruña, Spain. It is managed by the Cultural Association known as Colectivo de Universitarios Activos (Collective of University Assets), for which the station is named. The signal is transmitted from a University of A Coruña building called the Campus de Zapateira (Zapateira Campus), which houses the studio José Couso (or Studio 1) and the station's editors. In the autumn of 2010, it will start the Studio Alexandre Bóveda (or Studio 2).

Since its founding it has been a forum for many journalists, such as Hugh McGinley, Antón Lezcano, Txuri Ferrer, Fernando Molezún, Teba Chacón, Omar Bello, Javier Lojo, Isaac González, Ariana Fernández Palomo and Alvaro Valiño. Also for many writers, such as Estíbaliz Espinosa and Lucía Aldao.

== History ==
The station's origins can be traced to the Press Club of the University of A Coruña. In 1995, the club performed a program called A pé de Campus in Radio Culleredo, and thought that the UDC should have a radio that would give a voice to all students and groups, so on June 15, they created the Colectivo de Universitarios Activos as a youth association. Only two of the founders (Tomás Legido y Mariano Fernández), remain an active part of Cuac FM.

On March 8, 1996, an antenna and transmitter were installed in an office in the Department of Economics, and the trial period began. The inauguration took place on March 27, relying on the study with Antonio Erias, Dean of the Faculty of Economics, and Manuel Sarcedo, Vice Provost of Students.

In May 2002, the studio was surprisingly closed because the Faculty of Economics was moving to the Campus of Elviña, and the building would be occupied by the Faculty of Philology (who used the classroom space to expand the library), but in October 2003 resumed FM broadcasts, with the help of Manuel Rivas and Xurxo Souto.

Although it was conceived as a university radio station, it gradually became a community radio station, though continued broadcasting from the university. In 2006, coinciding with its tenth anniversary, it joined five other radio projects in creating the Galician Network of Free and Community Radios, (ReGaRLiC) although it still has no legal personality. After attending various meetings of community media from all over Spain, it helped establish the Red de Medios Comunitarios (Community Media Network of Spain) on May 24, 2009, with Mariano Enrique Fernandez Cabarcos assuming the role of Secretariat and the Coordinator of Legislation. Cuac FM would, moreover, have a place in the head office of the Network.
