= Ahmed Bouanani =

Moroccan filmmaker and author

- أحمد البوعناني
- Born: 16 November 1938; Casablanca, Morocco
- Died: 6 February 2011 (aged 72); Demnate, Morocco
- Citizenship: Morocco
- Occupations: Film director, Writer, Poet, Screenwriter

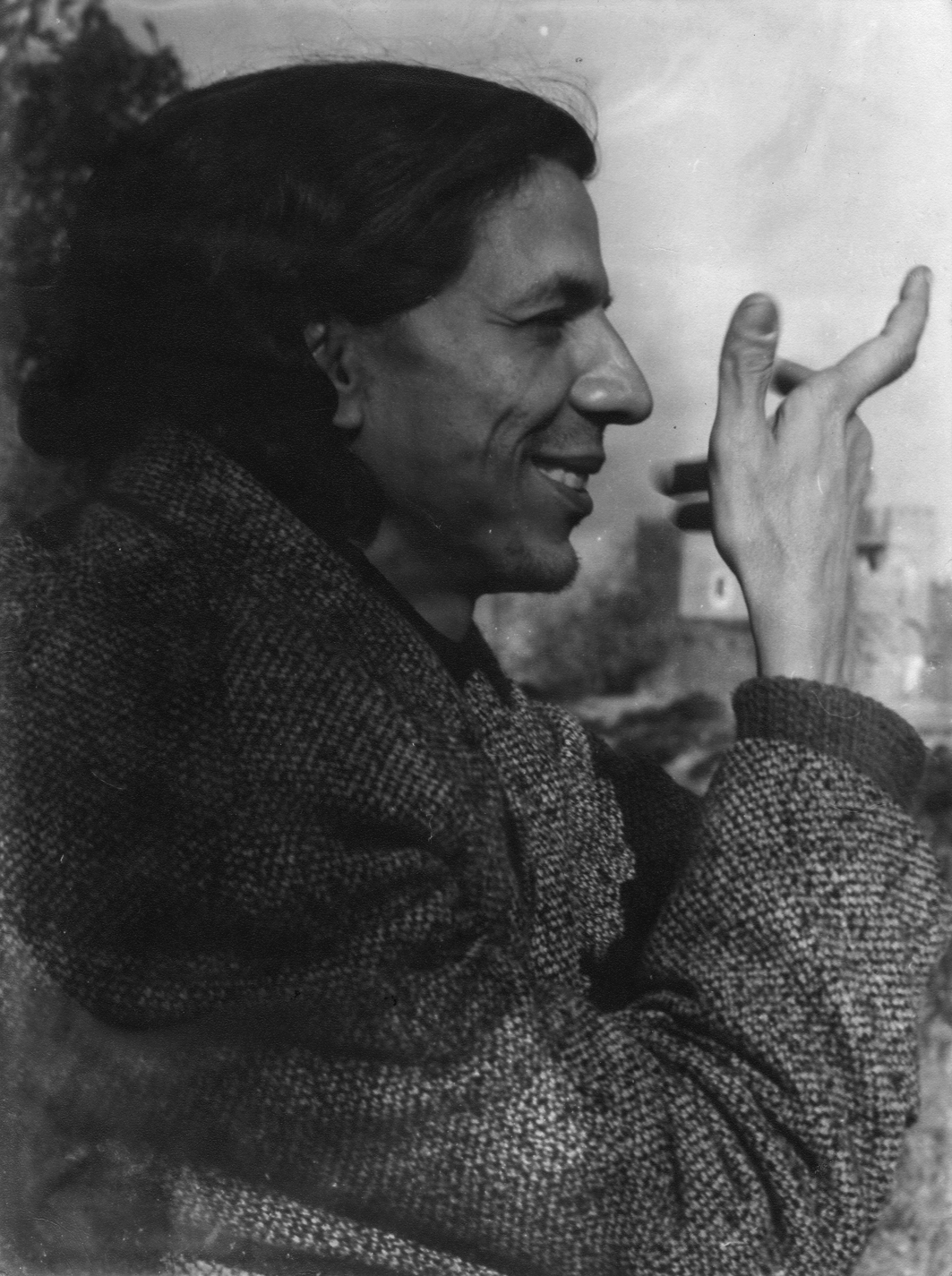
Ahmed Bouanani photographed by his brother Mohamed in 1970

Ahmed Bouanani (Arabic: أحمد البوعناني; 16 November 1938 – 6 February 2011) was a Moroccan film director, poet and novelist. He was one of the most influential filmmakers in Morocco and is considered to be one of the country's pioneers. His film The Mirage is often considered to be one of the greatest achievements in Moroccan film history, being selected as one of the 100 best and most important films in North Africa and the Middle East by the 10th Dubai International Film Festival in 2013.

== Career ==
Bouanani's films include poetic documentaries such as Six et Douze (1968) and Mémoire 14 (1971) as well as short fictions such as Tarfaya: La Marche d'un Poète (1966) and Les Quatres Sources (1974).

While The Mirage (1979) was Bouanani's last film due to the political constraints he faced during Morocco's years of lead, he continued to write screenplays including Bye-Bye Souirty (1998) which he also edited and The Wind Horse (2001), both directed by Daoud Aoulad Syad. Ahmed Bouanani also continued contributing to Moroccan films including as an actor and artistic director in Farida Benlyazid's feature film A Door to the Sky (1989).

Bouanani's films are often understood within a larger movement for cultural decolonization in Morocco and his desire to ground Moroccan filmmaking in the country's oral heritage and popular memory. Aside from his films which are often constructed as oral poems or folktales, Bouanani has written on the subject of oral heritage such as in articles like Introduction à la poésie populaire marocaine.

In addition to filmmaking, Bouanani wrote three collections of poetry including The Shutters (1980) and one novel, The Hospital (1989), both translated into English. His unpublished history of Moroccan cinema, The Seventh Gate: A History of Cinema in Morocco from 1907 to 1986 was posthumously published in 2020 by his daughter Touda Bouanani and Moroccan poet Omar Berrada. Bouanani was also a regular writer in the avant-garde Moroccan cultural journal Souffles (1966-1973) in which he contributed with both essays and poetry. In 1983, he also made a comic strip for the newspaper Al Maghrib.

== Legacy ==
Today Ahmed Bouanani's daughter Touda Bouanani is also a filmmaker, and the keeper of the family archives. Ahmed Bouanani's legacy, in addition to that of his wife, artistic director and costume designer, Naima Saoudi and daughter Batoul Bouanani, are managed by the Archives Bouanani collective, headed by his daughter Touda Bouanani.

== Bibliography ==
- The Hospital (L'hôpital, novel)
- The Shutters (Persiennes, poetry)

== Filmography ==
=== Feature films ===
- 1979: The Mirage

=== Short films ===
- 1968 : 6 et 12
- 1971 : Mémoire 14
- 1974 : Les Quatre Sources
- 1966 : La Marche d’un poète
