= HollyBlood =

- Theatrical release poster
- Directed by: Jesús Font
- Screenplay by: José María Pérez Quintero
- Produced by: Beatriz Bodegas
- Starring: Óscar Casas; Isa Montalbán; Jordi Sánchez
- Cinematography: Javier Salmones
- Edited by: Cristina Laguna
- Music by: Vanessa Garde
- Production companies: La Canica Films; Quexito Films; SUICA Films; Amigos y Colmillos AIE
- Distributed by: Filmax
- Release dates: 12 July 2022 (Paterna); 22 July 2022 (Spain)
- Country: Spain
- Language: Spanish

HollyBlood is a 2022 Spanish teen romantic comedy with horror and parodical elements directed by Jesús Font which stars Óscar Casas and Isa Montalbán alongside Jordi Sánchez, Piero Méndez and Carlos Suárez, among others.

== Plot ==
The plot follows Javi, an unremarkable high school student infatuated with classmate Sara, fangirling in turn on a vampire book series. Upon a series of misunderstandings, Sara ends up believing Javi to be a vampire, while the threat of an actual vampire looms in.

== Cast ==
- Óscar Casas as Javi
- Isa Montalbán as Sara
- Jordi Sánchez as Fernando
- Carlos Suárez as Diego
- Lara Boedo as Carmen
- Piero Méndez as Azrael
- Amparo Fernández as Sor Learza
- Ferrán Gadea as padre Ángel
- Mateo Medina as Manu
- Jany Collado as Ronald
- Manuel Canchal as Quini
- Ana Revert as Holly

== Production ==
HollyBlood was produced by La Canica Films, Quexito Films, SUICA Films and Amigos y Colmillos AIE, with the participation of RTVE and Netflix. It was shot in the Valencia region, including locations such as Valencia, Carcaixent and Sueca.

== Release ==
Selected as a pre-screening for the 'Antonio Ferrandis' Paterna Film Festival, the film screened at the Cines Kinepolis on 12 July 2022. Distributed by Filmax, the film was theatrically released on 22 July 2022 in Spain. Netflix set a 7 September 2022 streaming release date.

== Reception ==
Sergio F. Pinilla of Cinemanía rated the "unexpectedly fun" vampire romantic comedy 3½ out of 5 stars, considering that, "leaving prejudices aside, laughs and surprises abound, as well as film references".

Raquel Hernández Luján of HobbyConsolas scored 55 out of 100 points ("so-so"), assessing that, insofar the film aims towards parodying the genre of teenage vampire sagas in an effort to entertain, it is successful at times, although the humor leaves much to be desired.

== Accolades ==
Year	Award	Category	Nominee(s)	Result	Ref.
2022	5th Berlanga Awards	Best Supporting Actor	Ferran Gadea	Nominated	
2022	5th Berlanga Awards	Best Art Direction	Rafa Jannone	Won	
2022	5th Berlanga Awards	Best Sound	José Manuel Sospedra	Nominated	
2022	5th Berlanga Awards	Best Makeup and Hairstyles	Esther Guillem y Ana Guillem	Nominated	

== See also ==
- List of Spanish films of 2022
