= Watch Your Dreams =

- Spanish: Lucidez
- Directed by: Gonzalo Bendala
- Screenplay by: Gonzalo Bendala; David Sueiro
- Produced by: Marta Velasco
- Starring: Óscar Casas; Fiona Palomo; José Coronado; Najwa Nimri
- Cinematography: Alejandro Espadero
- Production companies: Áralan Films; Lucidez AIE
- Release date: 2026
- Country: Spain
- Language: Spanish

Watch Your Dreams (Spanish: Lucidez) is an upcoming psychological thriller directed by Gonzalo Bendala from a screenplay co-written with David Sueiro. It stars Óscar Casas, Fiona Palomo, José Coronado, and Najwa Nimri.

== Plot ==
Young lawyer Jaime is initiated into lucid dreaming by enigmatic Clara, but as so he delves deeper into it, the line between dreaming and wakefulness becomes blurried.

== Cast ==
- Óscar Casas as Jaime
- Fiona Palomo as Clara
- José Coronado
- Najwa Nimri

== Production ==
As early as August 2018, Bendala was reported to have purchased a script by David Sueiro titled Lucidez about the control of dreams in which he was already working. The film is an Áralan Films and Lucidez AIE production with the participation of RTVE, HBO Max, and Canal Sur. Alejandro Espadero worked as director of photography.

Shooting in Bilbao took three weeks, wrapping on 3 November 2025. The production then moved to the province of Seville, shooting in Seville, Mairena del Aljarafe, Tomares, and Alcalá de Guadaíra. Filming was announced to have wrapped in mid December 2025.

== Release ==
Film Factory acquired international rights to the film except for the Latin American market, where AF Pictures secured sales rights. The release is expected for 2026.

== See also ==
- List of Spanish films of 2026
