= Alba Gutiérrez =

Spanish actress (born 1994)

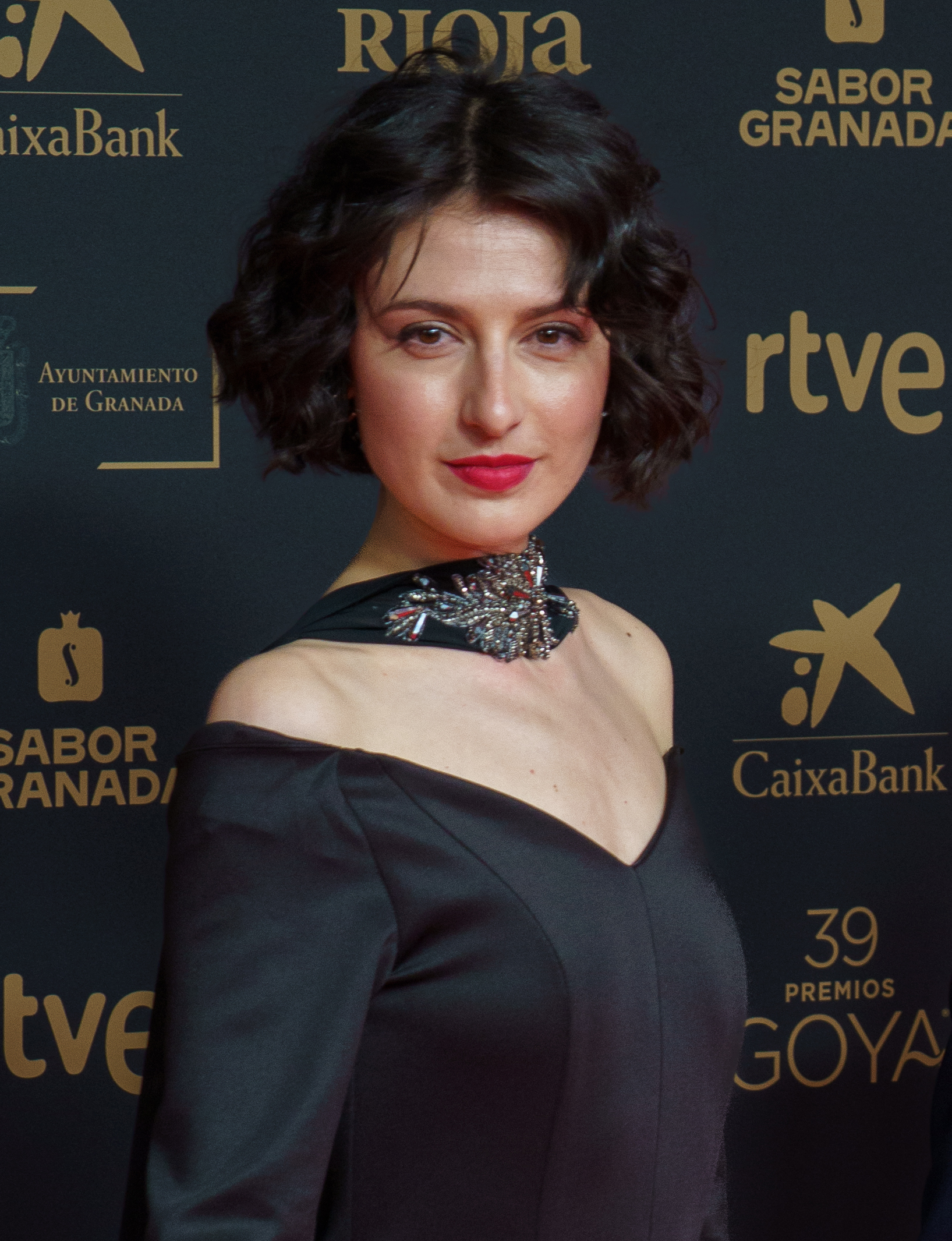
- Gutiérrez in 2025
- Born: Alba Fernández Gutiérrez; 18 February 1994 (age 32); Madrid, Spain
- Occupations: Actress, dancer, film director, screenwriter
- Mother: Chus Gutiérrez
- Relatives: Blanca Li (aunt)

Alba Fernández Gutiérrez (born 18 February 1994) is a Spanish actress, dancer, film director and screenwriter, known for starring in Acacias 38 throughout its fourth season and for playing Inés Valbuena in La Moderna.

== Early life ==
Gutiérrez was born on 18 February 1994 in Madrid, the daughter of director, producer and screenwriter Chus Gutiérrez. She is also the niece of the choreographer and dancer Blanca Li and composer Tao Gutiérrez.

== Career ==
Gutiérrez has been acting since she was a child. She appeared in the films Poniente (2002), El Calentito (2005) and Return to Hansala (2008), all directed by her mother Chus Gutiérrez. In 2013, she starred in the film Cinema Verité Verité directed by Elena Manrique. Gutiérrez has also acted in several short films and in 2016 she graduated from the RESAD (Royal School of Dramatic Art) in Madrid. She also completed her training with classical and contemporary dance courses at the Víctor Ullate Roche school. She has also acted in numerous plays, including The Harvest of the Senses (2014), Damned Lisiasa (2014), The Fashionable Family (2015), Madrid Nights (2016), Ailments (2016), Love Room 102 (2017), A Midsummer Night's Dream (2017), Barcelona 92 (2018), Tsunami (2018) and Inhuman Resources (2018).

From 2018 to 2019, Gutiérrez starred in the soap opera Acacias 38, playing the role of Lucía Alvarado, a young heiress who falls in love with the priest Telmo Martínez (played by Dani Tatay). In 2019 and 2020, she starred in the soap opera Amar es para siempre in the role of Marina Crespo Solano1617 and later, in 2021, also in the spin-off #Luimelia, alongside Paula Usero and Carol Rovira.

In 2020, Gutiérrez appeared in Rol & Rol, a documentary about women's empowerment, directed by her mother Chus Gutiérrez. In 2021, she wrote and directed her first short film XSmall, starring actress Paula Usero. The short film won six awards. In 2022 she starred in the film Sin ti no puedo, directed by her mother Chus Gutiérrez. She is also in the cast of the fourth season of Madres. Amor y vida (a Mediaset España series and distributed on Prime Video Spain) and in the two French series Marion and Cuisine interne, the latter filmed in Paris. In 2023 she participated in the Mediaset España series Escándalo. Relato de una obsesión, and the series Between Lands, the Spanish version of La sposa. Also in same year she became part of the main cast of the daily series La Moderna, in which she plays Inés Valbuena, Laurita's sister and Don Fermín's niece.
