= Mina Serrano =

Spanish actress (born 1997)

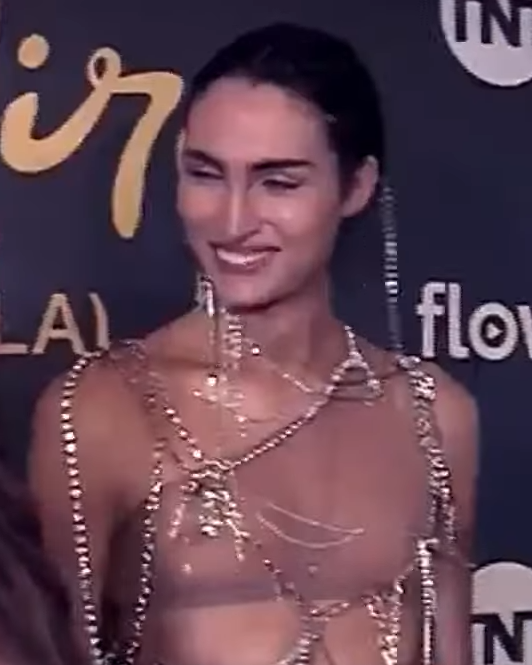
- Serrano in 2024
- Born: 1997 (age 28–29); Granada, Spain
- Education: Madrid Royal Conservatory
- Occupations: Actress and vedette
- Notable work: Cris Miró (Ella)

Mina Serrano (born 1997) is a Spanish actress, best known for playing as the vedette Cris Miró in the Argentine television series Cris Miró (Ella).

== Early life and career ==
Serrano was born in 1997 in Granada, Spain, and at the age of 17, she moved to Madrid to study drama. She is transgender.

While studying at the Royal Conservatory of Madrid, she began her career as a cabaret artist. She would later make her acting debut through the Italian film The Fabulous Ones, released in 2022.

She rose in popularity in 2024 after starring in the Argentine television series Cris Miró (Ella), based on the life of Cris Miró, an Argentine vedette and trans woman, whom Serrano herself learned of 20 years after her death, when a friend of hers lent her the book Las malas by Camila Sosa Villada.

== Awards and nominations ==
In 2024, Serrano was nominated in two different categories for the Produ Award for her role in Cris Miró (Ella), being nominated for Best New Actress and Best Leading Actress in a Biographical Series.

== Filmography ==
- The Fabulous Ones (2022)
- Cris Miró (Ella) (2024)
