= Ruth Díaz =

Spanish actress

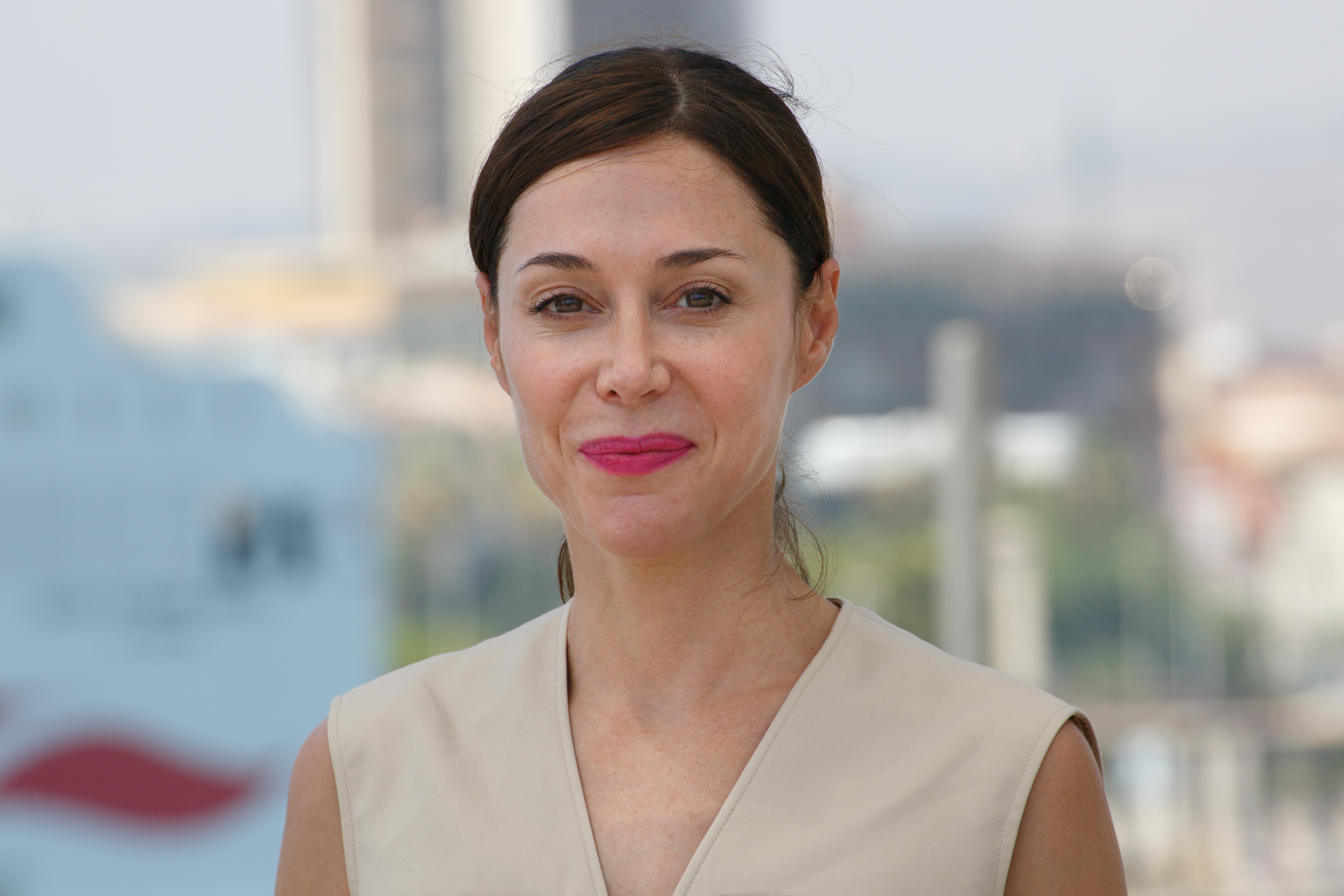
- Díaz in 2020
- Born: Ruth Díaz Muriedas; 25 January 1975 (age 51); Reinosa, Spain
- Education: RESAD
- Occupations: Actress; film director

Ruth Díaz Muriedas (born 25 January 1975) is a Spanish actress. She made a breakthrough performance in the 2016 film The Fury of a Patient Man.

== Biography ==
Ruth Díaz Muriedas was born in Reinosa, Province of Santander, on 25 January 1975. She began to perform in stage plays at age 17, excelling in a stage representation of Fortunata y Jacinta at the Teatro Español in Madrid in 1993. Díaz graduated from the RESAD.

She landed her first television role in the police drama series El comisario in 1999, whereas she made her feature film debut in the 2001 film Killer Housewives. She featured afterwards in the films Para entrar a vivir and El calentito. Some of her early television roles include performances in Al salir de clase (2001), Hospital Central (2003), Amar en tiempos revueltos (2009), Los misterios de Laura (2010) and Cuéntame (2012). After some time relatively distanced from the acting profession with no major roles (due to her pregnancy and the economic crisis, although she made her directorial debut with the 2013 short film Porsiemprejamón), she returned to cinema playing the role of Ana in the 2016 film The Fury of a Patient Man, which earned her recognition and awards. In 2018, she starred as Mercedes Carrillo in the third season of Locked Up and was also cast for the role of Laura in El pueblo. She also featured in The Mantises (2026).

== Accolades ==
Year	Award	Category	Work	Result	Ref.
2006	15th Actors and Actresses Union Awards	Best New Actress	El Calentito	Nominated	
2016	73rd Venice International Film Festival	Orizzonti Award for Best Actress	The Fury of a Patient Man	Won	
2017	4th Feroz Awards	Best Supporting Actress (film)	The Fury of a Patient Man	Won	
2017	72nd CEC Medals	Best Supporting Actress	The Fury of a Patient Man	Won	
2017	72nd CEC Medals	Best New Actress	The Fury of a Patient Man	Nominated	
2017	31st Goya Awards	Best New Actress	The Fury of a Patient Man	Nominated	
2017	26th Actors and Actresses Union Awards	Best New Actress	The Fury of a Patient Man	Won	
