= Lucía Veiga =

Spanish actress, comedian, and television presenter (born 1979)

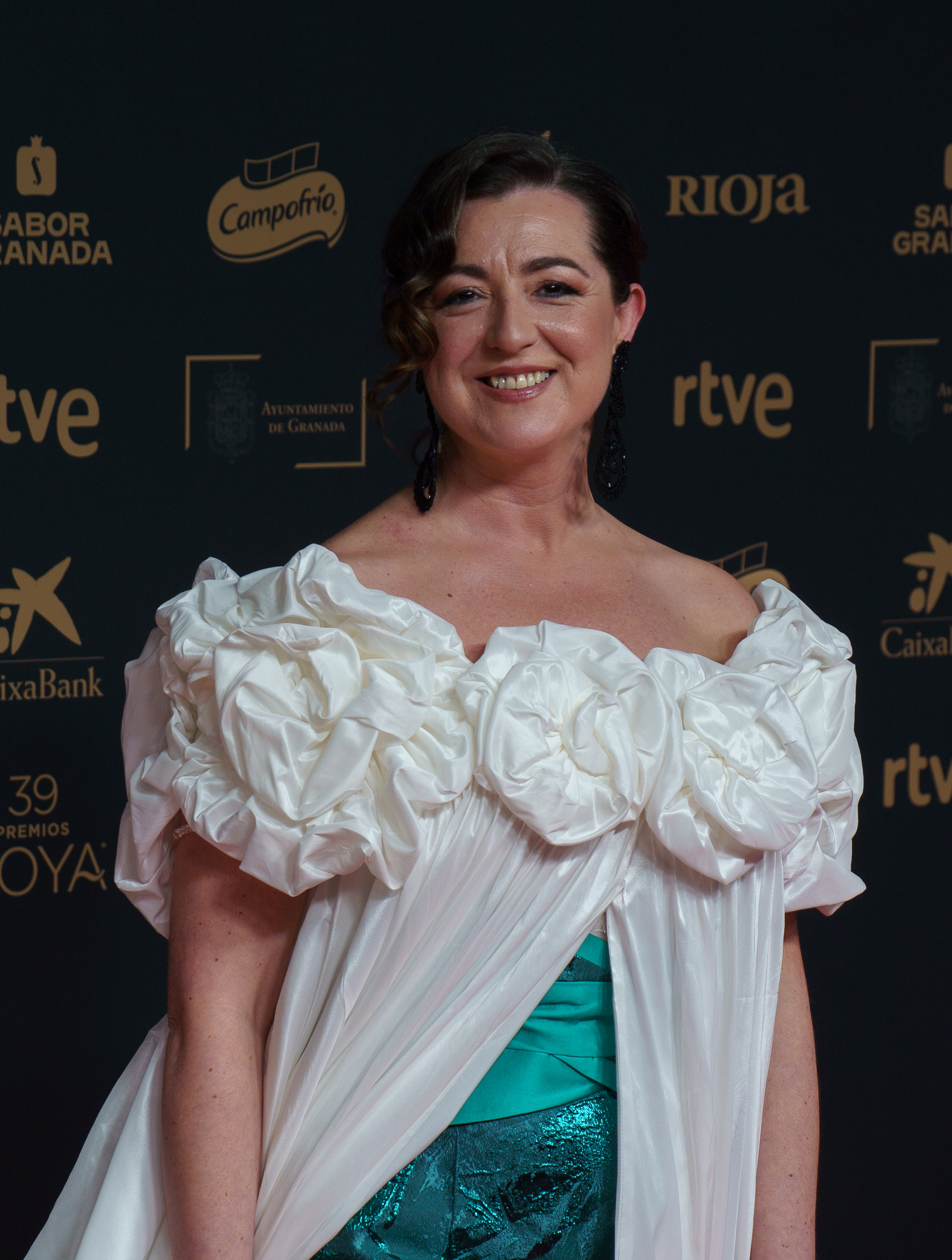
- Veiga in 2025
- Born: Lucía Veiga López; 1979 (age 46–47); A Coruña, Spain
- Education: University of A Coruña (BA in Hispanic Philology)
- Occupations: Actress; Comedian; Television presenter
- Years active: 2018–present
- Notable work: Rapa (2022–2024); Soy Nevenka (2024); Malicia Noticias (2022–present)
- Awards: Mestre Mateo Award for Best Actress (2023); Mestre Mateo Award for Best Communicator (2024); Círculo de Escritores Cinematográficos Medal (2025)

Lucía Veiga López (born 1979) is a Spanish actress, comedian, and television presenter. She gained recognition for her role as Norma in the Netflix series Rapa (2022–2024), which earned her the Mestre Mateo Award for Best Actress in 2023. In 2024, she received a Goya Award nomination for Best New Actress for her performance in Soy Nevenka, directed by Icíar Bollaín. In May 2025, she was elected president of the Academia Galega do Audiovisual (Galician Academy of Audiovisual Arts).

== Early life and education ==
Veiga was born in A Coruña, Galicia, in 1979. She graduated with a degree in Hispanic Philology from the University of A Coruña. Before pursuing acting, she worked as a mobile phone sales representative.

During her university years, she was actively involved in campus media and social causes. She collaborated with the community radio station Cuac FM, as well as with Xacarandaina and the university's Office of Solidarity Action. She has continued to collaborate with Cuac FM on special occasions, including their 25th anniversary celebration.

== Career ==
=== Career transition and early work (2018–2020) ===
In 2018, after being laid off from her job as a mobile phone sales representative, Veiga decided to pursue acting professionally at the age of 39.

Her first television appearance was in 2008 with a guest role in the Telecinco series Vivir sin permiso. She subsequently appeared in the TVG series A Estiba before transitioning to more prominent roles.

=== Television breakthrough (2020–2024) ===
Veiga's breakthrough came with her role as Norma, a murderous physiotherapist, in the critically acclaimed series Rapa (2022–2024), produced for Movistar+. The series, filmed in Galicia, showcased her dramatic acting abilities and earned her widespread recognition. Her performance was praised by critics, with many noting how "the comedian who suddenly got serious became frightening."

For her work in Rapa, Veiga received both the Feroz Award and the Mestre Mateo Award for Best Actress in 2023. She also appeared in other series including El desorden que dejas for Netflix and As Neves (2024).

In September 2022, Veiga became the main presenter of Malicia Noticias, a satirical news program on TVG. Her work as a television presenter earned her the Mestre Mateo Award for Best Communicator in 2024.

=== Film recognition and Goya nomination (2024–present) ===
Veiga's transition to film brought her significant recognition with her role as Charo Velasco in Soy Nevenka (2024), directed by Icíar Bollaín. The film tells the story of Nevenka Fernández, the first woman in Spain to successfully prosecute a politician for sexual harassment. Veiga portrayed the opposition leader who supported Fernández when most of society turned against her.

Her performance in Soy Nevenka earned her a nomination for the Goya Award for Best New Actress at the 39th Goya Awards in 2025. She also received the Medal of the Círculo de Escritores Cinematográficos (Circle of Film Writers) in the Best New Actress category for the same role in 2025.

In 2025, Veiga starred as Emilia Pardo Bazán in the film Mi ilustrísimo amigo (My Dearest Friend) by Paula Cons, which depicts the love story between Benito Pérez Galdós and the Galician intellectual. Veiga described the role as "a lot of pressure for someone from A Coruña to play Emilia, embodying someone you admire and studied in high school."

=== Other activities ===
Veiga is also involved in comedy and improvisational theater. Together with Marita Martínez, she formed the comedy duo "Las Izquierdo Sisters" (formerly "Las Hermanas Izquierdo"), which specializes in improvisational comedy. Their performances involve audience participation, with spectators providing ideas, place names, and objects that the duo incorporates into their improvised stories.

She served as the presenter of the XIX Gala of the Mestre Mateo Awards.

== Leadership role ==
On 30 May 2025, Veiga was elected president of the Academia Galega do Audiovisual (Galician Academy of Audiovisual Arts), succeeding Álvaro Pérez Becerra. She became the third woman to hold this position, with a mandate running from 2025 to 2027. The academy's board was renewed with significant female representation, and Veiga stated that the organization aims to "promote a more diverse, safe, and inclusive Galician audiovisual industry."

== Filmography ==
=== Television ===
Year	Title	Role	Notes
2008	Vivir sin permiso		Guest appearance
2020–2021	A Estiba		TVG series
2021	El desorden que dejas		Netflix series
2022–2024	Rapa	Norma	Movistar+ series
2022–present	Malicia Noticias	Presenter	TVG satirical news program
2024	As Neves	Sarxento Portas	
2024	Celeste	Mother of Aarón	
2024	Clanes	Natalia	

=== Film ===
Year	Title	Role	Notes
2024	Soy Nevenka	Charo Velasco	Directed by Icíar Bollaín
2025	Mi ilustrísimo amigo	Emilia Pardo Bazán	Directed by Paula Cons

== Awards and nominations ==
Year	Award	Category	Work	Result
2023	Feroz Awards	Best Actress	Rapa	Won
2023	Mestre Mateo Awards	Best Actress	Rapa	Won
2024	Mestre Mateo Awards	Best Communicator	Malicia Noticias	Won
2025	Círculo de Escritores Cinematográficos	Medal for Best New Actress	Soy Nevenka	Won
2025	Goya Awards	Best New Actress	Soy Nevenka	Nominated
