= Óscar Casas =

Spanish actor (born 1998)

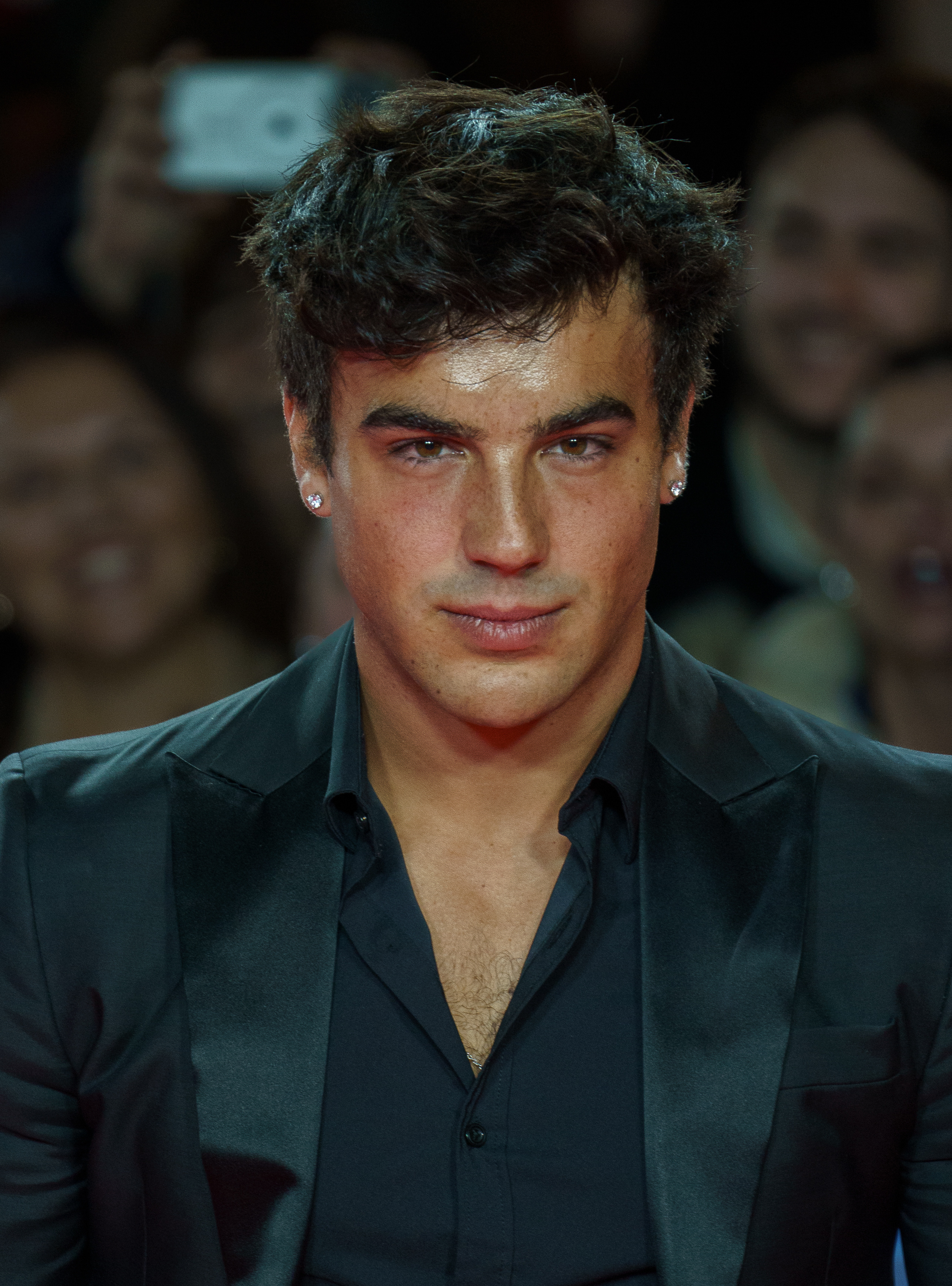
- Casas in 2025
- Born: Óscar Casas Sierra; 21 September 1998 (age 27); Barcelona, Catalonia, Spain
- Occupation: Actor
- Relatives: Mario Casas (brother)

Óscar Casas Sierra (born 21 September 1998) is a Spanish actor.

== Biography ==
Óscar Casas Sierra was born on 21 September 1998 in Barcelona. He made his television debut as an actor at age 6 in the series Abuela de verano, whereas he made his feature film debut at age 8, appearing in the 2006 film 53 Winter Days. Owing to his resemblance to his elder brother Mario Casas (also an actor), he sometimes performed younger versions of the characters portrayed by Mario in his early career as a child actor. He landed his first leading role in a film with a performance in El sueño de Iván (2011).

== Filmography ==
=== Film ===
Key
†	Denotes films that have not yet been released

Year	Title	Role	Notes	Ref.
2006	53 días de invierno (53 Winter Days)		Film debut	
2007	El orfanato (The Orphanage)	Tomás Espósito	Masked performance	
2011	El sueño de Iván	Iván		
2021	Xtremo (Xtreme)	Leo		
2022	HollyBlood	Javi		
2023	Últimas voluntades (Last Wishes)	Andrés		
2023	Mi soledad tiene alas (My Loneliness Has Wings)	Dan		
2025	Control Room			
2025	Me has robado el corazón	Eric		
2026	Ídolos (Idols)	Edu		
2026	Deseo	Matías		
TBA	Lucidez † (Watch Your Dreams)	Jaime		

=== Television ===
Year	Title	Role	Notes	Ref.
2005	Abuela de verano	Miguel	13 episodes	
2006	Los Serrano	Alberto	2 episodes	
2009–14	Águila Roja	Gabi	54 episodes	
2017	Si fueras tú	Rafael Castro		
2018	Cuéntame cómo pasó	Bruno	Introduced in season 19	
2019	Instinto	José Mur	Younger brother of Mario Casas' character	
2020	Siempre bruja (Always a Witch)	Kobo	Introduced in season 2	
2021	Jaguar	Castro		

== Accolades ==
Year	Award	Category	Work	Result	Ref.
2020	7th Feroz Awards	Best Supporting Actor in a Series	Instinto	Nominated	
