= Service95 =

Dua Lipa lifestyle newsletter

- Categories: Lifestyle
- Frequency: Weekly
- Founder: Dua Lipa
- Founded: 2021
- Based in: London, United Kingdom
- Language: English
- Website: service95.com

Service95 is a weekly lifestyle newsletter and website founded in 2021 by English singer Dua Lipa. Announced in November 2021, the newsletter's first issue was released on 3 February 2022. Described as a "global style, culture, and society concierge service created to help the reader make sense of the world", each newsletter features a personal letter from Lipa alongside several articles from guest contributors. It features topics including recommendations, travel advice and politics and ranges from lighthearted stories to hard-hitting reporting. The goal of the newsletter according to its founder, is to broaden the scope of journalism by featuring pieces that cannot be found elsewhere.

Lipa was inspired to create the newsletter from the lists of recommendations she had created for her friends since she was a child. The newsletter is based in London. An accompanying podcast hosted by Lipa entitled Dua Lipa: At Your Service was launched on 11 February 2022. The podcasts feature in-depth conversations between Lipa and high-profile guests. The goal of the podcast is to help listeners learn more about themselves through her guests' stories.

The Service95 Book Club launched in June 2023. Each month, they discuss a book personally chosen by Lipa, representing writing from across the globe, assisted by new editorial content – such as video interviews with Lipa, exclusive essays, further reading lists and playlists.

== History ==
On 23 November 2021, Dua Lipa announced that she would launch a free weekly newsletter entitled Service95 in February 2022. It was described as a "global style, culture, and society concierge service created to help the reader make sense of the world" and "a way to find order in the chaos"; Lipa described it as "a general store with all the content you've always wanted to read". Lipa was inspired to create the newsletter by her longtime hobby of sharing personally curated lists with her closest friends that mentioned lesser-known "people, pieces of pop culture, travel destinations, hidden gems and global issues". The singer had been "obsessively" making the lists since she was a child, and they have become her friends' "go-to" for recommendations. Once Lipa started touring, her passion for the lists grew as she was getting to explore the world. The singer said her parents would make fun of her for making the lists. Lipa stated that she created the lists as a "fear of forgetting to share" as well as a way to connect with loved ones and the fact that she loves documenting her experiences. She went on to say "the more we share with each other, the closer we become, the wider our circles grow" and that she finds "huge joy in telling people what [she has] learned about in any given city and love[s] finding connection in our shared experiences". Service95 takes that idea and brings it to anyone who is as curious as she is about life. The newsletter name comes from Lipa's birth year, 1995, and the fact that she has always seen herself as "of service" to her friends and family through these lists, and now to her fans. Lipa registered the trademark from Service95 in June 2021.

Service95 is a global editorial platform curating content from lifestyle, fashion, culture, travel, and activism, insights into Lipa's life as well as lists on everything from the latest creatives, music, food and book recommendations. Lipa also intended to broaden the types and scopes of stories one might read. She mentioned that the newsletter is all about accessibility, meaning that the idea behind it is sharing information and helping one another. Some issues focus on a single story, giving it space to breathe while others will pair lighthearted features with hard-hitting reporting. Lipa teased that the newsletter would include "everything from underground galleries in Brazil, to little-known diners in Louisiana and the best manicurists in Lagos" as well as "her favourite tucked-away hotel in Paris, to the best spot for dumplings in the 11th arrondissement, to the playlist she made to listen to on the flight home". Every issue includes a personal letter from Lipa that mentions where she is in the world and her tips on what she has been doing, her favourite spots and latest obsessions in culture. The first issue launched on 3 February 2022.

Service95 is a free weekly newsletter that will cover everything from little-known hotspots to up-and-coming artists and travel tips. Service95 serves up a considered curation of lists, recommendations, stories, information, thoughts, perspectives, and conversations you won't hear, see, or read anywhere else. Powerful articles from the world's most compelling voices live alongside savvy social commentary, laugh-out-loud feature-writing, and left-of-centre recommendations for anything from late-night snacks to the places to visit on your next holiday. Activism plays a central role on the platform, spotlighting important causes that might otherwise remain unknown.

— Lipa on what to expect from Service95

In the first issue, Lipa gave an update on her Future Nostalgia Tour and the Dua Lipa: At Your Service podcast while mentioning her five favourite restaurants in London. There were articles on amapiano, a house music subgenre emerging in South Africa, a feature on Sinéad Burke about her work designing things to be more accessible for more diverse individuals, one on a Hong Kong-based, all-female roller derby crew and one on a Paris-based homeware store.

Service95 also curates the Manifesto Library of banned and censored books together with staff at the bookstore it resides at, the Livraria Lello in Porto.

== Dua Lipa: At Your Service ==
Dua Lipa: At Your Service
- Format: Streaming
- Language: English

Cast and voices
- Hosted by: Dua Lipa

Publication
- No. of episodes: 35
- Original release: 11 February 2022
- Provider: iHeartRadio

Alongside the announcement of Service95, Lipa revealed that a companion podcast entitled Dua Lipa: At Your Service would also accompany the newsletter. The podcast is intended for Lipa to have deep conversations with a line up of high-profile guests. She explained: "though a lot of my guests have done their fair share of talking, I want to go deeper with them. Not only am I probing them about the things I'm most curious about, I'm also treating them like the experts they are". Lipa mentioned that the conversations cover global concerns and casual chats while she hopes that listeners will learn something about themselves from the inspiring stories guests will tell.

The goal of the conversations is "understanding their journey in a way that when people listen to it, it feels like it is of service, like the whole conversation, whether it is how a certain author got to where they are, how it all happened, relationship advice, growing up in the industry, understanding what that's like, what it takes to really get to where you want to be". Lipa stated that it's interesting being on the other side of the interview, which is a skill she has been developing and really enjoying, specifically saying she loves the research element of it and learning about people. The podcast launched on 11 February 2022 and has run for three seasons. The first season of the podcast was distributed by iHeartRadio. Its first season consisted of 12 episodes and featured guests including CL, Edward Enninful, Elton John, Megan Thee Stallion, Nadia Murad, Olivier Rousteing, Lisa Taddeo, Hanya Yanagihara and Bowen Yang. The third season of the podcast was sponsored by BBC.

=== Episodes ===
| Series | Episodes | Originally released | |
| Series | Episodes | First released | Last released |
|---|---|---|---|
| Special | 1 | 1 February 2022 | 1 February 2022 |
| 1 | 12 | 11 February 2022 | 29 April 2022 |
| 2 | 12 | 23 September 2022 | 9 December 2022 |
| 3 | 10 | 30 July 2023 | 1 September 2023 |

==== Special ====
List of special episodes with the title and release date
| No. overall | Title | Release date |
|---|---|---|
| 1 | "Introducing Dua Lipa: At Your Service" | 1 February 2022 |

==== Season 1 (2022) ====
List of episodes from Season 1, featured guest and release date
| No. overall | No. in season | Guest(s) | Release date |
|---|---|---|---|
| 2 | 1 | Olivier Rousteing | 11 February 2022 |
| 3 | 2 | Lisa Taddeo | 18 February 2022 |
| 4 | 3 | CL | 25 February 2022 |
| 5 | 4 | Edward Enninful | 4 March 2022 |
| 6 | 5 | Megan Thee Stallion | 11 March 2022 |
| 7 | 6 | Hanya Yanagihara | 18 March 2022 |
| 8 | 7 | Elton John | 25 March 2022 |
| 9 | 8 | Russell Brand | 1 April 2022 |
| 10 | 9 | Bowen Yang | 8 April 2022 |
| 11 | 10 | Nadia Murad and Amal Clooney | 15 April 2022 |
| 12 | 11 | Riz Ahmed | 22 April 2022 |

==== Season 2 (2022) ====
List of episodes from Season 2, featured guest and release date
| No. overall | No. in season | Guest(s) | Release date |
|---|---|---|---|
| 13 | 1 | Monica Lewinsky | 23 September 2022 |
| 14 | 2 | Min Jin Lee | 30 September 2022 |
| 15 | 3 | Charli XCX | 7 October 2022 |
| 16 | 4 | Bryan Stevenson | 14 October 2022 |
| 17 | 5 | Trevor Noah | 21 October 2022 |
| 18 | 6 | Brandon Wolf | 28 October 2022 |
| 19 | 7 | Dan Levy | 4 November 2022 |
| 20 | 8 | Dita Von Teese | 11 November 2022 |
| 21 | 9 | Mo Farah | 18 November 2022 |
| 22 | 10 | Greta Gerwig | 25 November 2022 |
| 23 | 11 | Pedro Almodóvar | 2 December 2022 |
| 24 | 12 | Dean Baquet | 9 December 2022 |

==== Season 3 (2023) ====
List of episodes from Season 3, featured guest and release date
| No. overall | No. in season | Guest(s) | Release date |
|---|---|---|---|
| 25 | 1 | Amelia Dimoldenberg | 30 June 2023 |
| 26 | 2 | Esther Perel | 7 July 2023 |
| 27 | 3 | Jennie Kim | 14 July 2023 |
| 28 | 4 | Penn Badgley | 21 July 2023 |
| 29 | 5 | Sasha Velour | 28 July 2023 |
| 30 | 6 | Amanda Feilding | 4 August 2023 |
| 31 | 7 | Paloma Elsesser | 11 August 2023 |
| 32 | 8 | Billie Eilish | 18 August 2023 |
| 33 | 9 | Ziwe | 25 August 2023 |
| 34 | 10 | Troye Sivan | 1 September 2023 |
| 35 | 12 | Tim Cook | 6 November 2023 |

== Service95 Book Club ==
In June 2023, Dua Lipa launched the Service95 Book Club with an in-person interview with Douglas Stuart on his book Shuggie Bain at Hay Festival in Hay-on-Wye. Each month Dua personally selects a new book to explore. Lipa does exclusive author interviews, and the authors share their playlists, reading lists and essays, among other editorial content around the world to get inside the author's world.

List of books

- Shuggie Bain by Douglas Stuart (June 2023)
- Pachinko by Min Jin Lee (July 2023)
- Half of a Yellow Sun by Chimamanda Ngozi Adichie (August 2023)
- Just Kids by Patti Smith (September 2023)
- One Hundred Years of Solitude by Gabriel García Márquez (October 2023)
- The Vanishing Half by Brit Bennett (November 2023)
- The Guest by Emma Cline (January 2024)
- A Thousand Splendid Suns by Khaled Hosseini (February 2024)
- Trust by Hernan Diaz (March 2024)
- Crying in H Mart by Michelle Zauner (April 2024)
- Swimming in the Dark by Tomasz Jedrowski (May 2024)
- Say Nothing by Patrick Radden Keefe (June 2024)
- Noughts & Crosses by Malorie Blackman (July 2024)
- Bad Habit by Alana Portero (September 2024)
- Lincoln in the Bardo by George Saunders (October 2024)
- On Earth We're Briefly Gorgeous by Ocean Vuong (November 2024)
- Drive Your Plow Over the Bones of the Dead by Olga Tokarczuk (January 2025)
- The Bee Sting by Paul Murray (February 2025)
- There There by Tommy Orange (March 2025)
- Grief Is the Thing with Feathers by Max Porter (April 2025)
- Still Born by Guadalupe Nettel (May 2025)
- Widow Basquiat by Jennifer Clement (June 2025)
- Small Boat by Vincent Delecroix (July 2025)
- This House of Grief by Helen Garner (August 2025)
- The Trees by Percival Everett (September 2025)
- Flesh by David Szalay (October 2025)
- The Handmaid's Tale by Margaret Atwood (November 2025)
- Brightly Shining by Ingvild H. Rishøi (December 2025)
- Night People by Mark Ronson (January 2026)
- The Son of Man by Jean-Baptiste Del Amo (February 2026)
- Bad Feminist by Roxane Gay (March 2026)
- Jerusalem by Jez Butterworth (April 2026)
- So Late in the Day by Claire Keegan (May 2026)
- Having Spent Life Seeking by Kae Tempest (June 2026)
- Free by Lea Ypi (July 2026)
- Lost Lambs by Madeline Cash (August 2026)
- Martyr! by Kaveh Akbar (September 2026)
- Klara And The Sun by Kazuo Ishiguro (October 2026)
- White Teeth by Zadie Smith (November 2026)

== Critical reception ==
In The Telegraph, Rebecca Reid stated "Lipa might really be on to something" as the contributors "have certainly grasped what made all lifestyle blogs great". She continued stating it contains "a feeling that you're discovering things you'd never be cool enough to find on your own, and the kind of recommendation you can pass on to a friend you want to impress while acting like you discovered it yourself". She concluded by stating "it's all the joys of the mid 00's blogosphere, tempered with an inclusive 2022 twist". For Elle, Lucy Cocoran said Service95 is like "an exclusive invitation into Dua's world, as seen through her eyes" while also complimenting her passion for "making it a platform for marginalised voices, bringing important issues to light in a digestible way".

The Guardian reviewer Hannah Verdier complimented Lipa's interviewing skills in Dua Lipa: At Your Service while stating that if the world needs another celebrity interview podcast, she's glad it's Lipa. The reviewer explained by naming the podcast a "thoughtful batch of interviews" that is "a far cry from the interruption-filled rambling of some celebrity pods". Eoghan O'Sullivan of the Irish Examiner praised the guests that appear on the podcast; the reviewer named the Olivier Rousteing episode the "best of the bunch", specifically complimenting Lipa's empathy towards Rousteing and the content he talks about. For the Irish Independent, Tony Clayton-Lea named Dua Lipa: At Your Service the "Podcast of the Week" in April 2022. He called it a "bold" intention for Lipa and said these intentions of solidified by the "obvious" and unexpected choice of guests.
