= Daniel Ibáñez (actor) =

Spanish actor (born 1995)

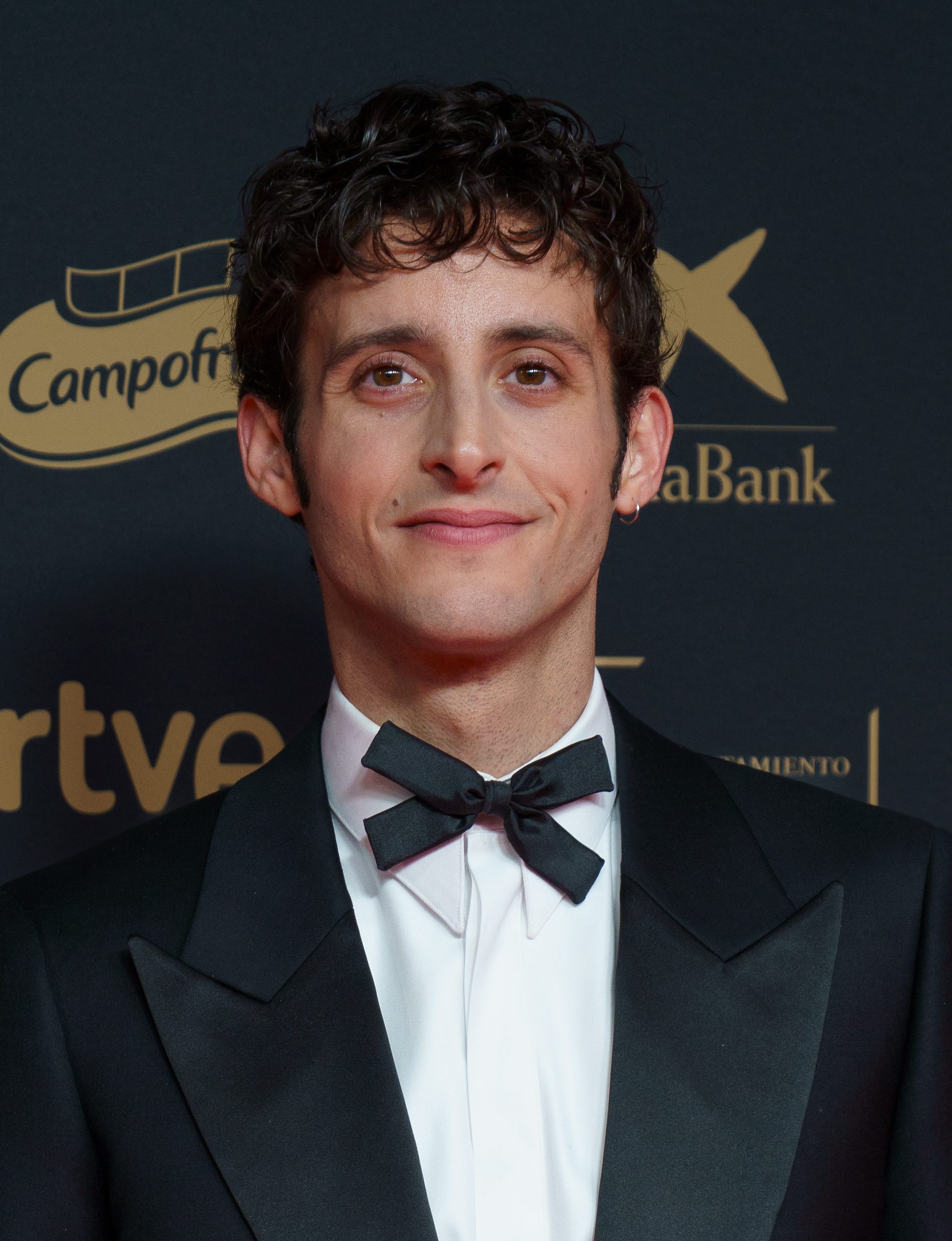
- Ibáñez in 2025
- Born: 1995 (age 30–31); Madrid, Spain
- Education: RESAD
- Occupation: Actor

Daniel Ibáñez (born 1995) is a Spanish actor.

== Life and career ==
Daniel Ibáñez was born in 1995 in Madrid. He earned a degree in interpretación textual from the RESAD.

Early film credits include appearances in Amar (2017), Terminator: Dark Fate (2019), The Good Boss (2021) and Outlaws.

He featured in the webseries Si fueras tú. He portrayed Álex Mujica in the dystopian television series The Barrier. He starred alongside Manu Ríos and Amaia Aberasturi in the teen drama miniseries La edad de la ira. He also featured in The Gypsy Bride and Operación Marea Negra.

In 2024, he starred as 'the singer' (a fictionalised version of Los Planetas' singer Jota) in musical drama film Saturn Return. His performance in the film earned him a nomination for the Goya Award for Best New Actor. He also portrayed Miguel Hernández in the stage play Para la libertad. He signed up as the lead of the film Domani.

== Accolades ==
Year	Award	Category	Work	Result	Ref.
2025	39th Goya Awards	Best New Actor	Saturn Return	Nominated	
2025	33rd Actors and Actresses Union Awards	Best Film Actor in a Leading Role	Saturn Return	Nominated	
