= My Dearest Señorita (2026 film) =

- Promotional release poster
- Spanish: Mi querida señorita
- Directed by: Fernando G. Molina
- Written by: Alana S. Portero
- Based on: Mi querida señorita by José Luis Borau and Jaime de Armiñán
- Produced by: Javier Ambrossi; Javier Calvo
- Starring: Elisabeth Martínez
- Cinematography: Carlos Rigo Bellver
- Edited by: Verónica Callón
- Music by: Álex de Lucas; Zahara
- Production company: Suma Content
- Distributed by: Tripictures
- Release dates: 8 March 2026 (Málaga); 17 April 2026 (Spain)
- Running time: 113 minutes
- Country: Spain
- Language: Spanish

My Dearest Señorita (Spanish: Mi querida señorita) is a 2026 Spanish drama film directed by Fernando G. Molina and written by Alana S. Portero based on the 1972 film of the same name. Led by newcomer Elisabeth Martínez, the cast also features Anna Castillo, Paco León, and Nagore Aranburu, among others.

The film world premiered at the 29th Málaga Film Festival on 8 March 2026 ahead of a limited theatrical release in Spain by Tripictures on 17 April 2026 and a Netflix streaming release on 1 May 2026.

== Plot ==
In 1999 Pamplona, only child Adela, raised in a conservative background, overprotected by their mother, and unaware of their intersexuality, starts a journey of self-discovery that takes them to Madrid.

== Cast ==
- Elisabeth Martínez as Adela
- Anna Castillo as Isabel
- Paco León as padre José María
- Nagore Aranburu as Cruz
- Manu Ríos as Gato
- Eneko Sagardoy as Santiago
- Lola Rodríguez as Angela
- María Galiana as Adelina

== Production ==
Written by Alana S. Portero, My Dearest Señorita is a free adaptation of the 1972 film Mi querida señorita, written in turn by Jaime de Armiñán and José Luis Borau. The project was first unveiled by Netflix in February 2024 as a project to be produced by Los Javis (Javier Ambrossi and Javier Calvo). It was later pitched by the streaming platform in September 2024 at the 72nd San Sebastián International Film Festival within a slate of future Spanish original films, with Netflix reporting the director and screenwriter to be respectively Fernando G. Molina and Alana S. Portero.

The film is a Suma Content (Javier Ambrossi and Javier Calvo) production for Netflix. Shooting began on 3 February 2025 in Pamplona, Navarre. On 6 February 2025, Netflix announced the main cast members, including Elisabeth Martínez (portraying the protagonist of the film), as well as Anna Castillo, Paco León, Nagore Aranburu, Manu Ríos, Eneko Sagardoy, Lola Rodríguez, María Galiana, and Delphina Bianco. According to Molina, doing the portrayal of intersex reality with an intersex leading actress (Martínez) was key for the project since its inception as well as a casting challenge.

Carlos Rigo Bellver served as director of photography, choosing an ARRI Alexa 35 and Panavision G Series lenses. Shooting was halted in its tenth day in the wake of a health issue suffered by Molina. Shooting resumed the following week in Madrid. Álex de Lucas and Zahara were behind the music score.

== Release ==
Director Fernando González Molina and lead actress Elisabeth Martínez attending the 2026 Málaga Film Festival

The film had its world premiere in the official selection of the 29th Málaga Film Festival on 8 March 2026. It will receive a theatrical release in Spain on 17 April 2026 by Tripictures ahead of its 1 May 2026 streaming debut on Netflix.

== Reception ==
On the review aggregator website Rotten Tomatoes, 100% of 11 critics' reviews are positive, with an average rating of 6.6/10.

Eduardo Parra of La Opinión de Málaga considered that although the film works, it is overly explanatory "and in that well-intentioned transparency, part of the mystery, pain and modernity of the Spanish classic is lost".

Raquel Hernández Luján of HobbyConsolas gave the film a 50-point score, lamenting that despite its good ideas and intentions, the film overreaches and is often guilty of lapsing into an "excessive didacticism".

Carmen L. Lobo of La Razón gave the film a 3-star rating, praising its first half ('a good costumbrista drama') as the best thing about the film, while noting that León's character is not very believable.

Javier Ocaña of El País singled out as the best thing about the film how it tells (almost) exactly the same story [as the original one], but in a different way, as a product of our time, otherwise pointing out that Portero's script is not afraid to be constantly rhetorical and explanatory.

== See also ==
- List of Spanish films of 2026
