= La edad de la ira =

Spanish limited television series

- Genre: Teen drama
- Created by: Lucía Carballal; Juanma Ruiz de Córdoba
- Based on: La edad de la ira by Nando López
- Directed by: Jesús Rodrigo
- Starring: Manu Ríos; Amaia Aberasturi; Daniel Ibáñez; Carlos Alcaide
- Country of origin: Spain
- Original language: Spanish
- No. of seasons: 1
- No. of episodes: 4

Production
- Executive producers: Montse García; Jesús Rodrigo; Carmen González; Javier Pons; Mireia Acosta
- Production companies: Atresmedia Televisión; Big Bang Media; Masficción

Original release
- Network: ATRESplayer Premium
- Release: 27 February – 20 March 2022

La edad de la ira is a 2022 Spanish teen drama thriller television series created by Lucía Carballal and Juanma Ruiz de Córdoba for Atresplayer based on the novel of the same name by Nando López. The cast is led by Manu Ríos, also featuring Amaia Aberasturi, Daniel Ibáñez, Eloy Azorín, and Carlos Alcaide.

== Premise ==
After a man is brutally murdered, Marcos, a popular high school teenager and the son of the victim, is identified as a possible killer. The plot deals with themes such as homophobia, identity formation, bullying, and violence against women.

== Cast ==
- Manu Ríos as Marcos.
- Amaia Aberasturi as Sandra.
- Daniel Ibáñez as Raúl.
- Carlos Alcaide as Ignacio.
- Eloy Azorín as Álvaro.
- Sara Jiménez.
- María Morales.
- Xavi Sáez.
- Eleazar Ortiz.
- Álvaro Larrán.
- Dani Sabiti.
- Daniel Cabrera.
- Oriol Franco.
- Markos Marín.
- Rocío Muñoz-Cobo.
- Sara Deray.
- Joan Pedrola.
- Marina Fábregas.

== Production ==
The series is based on Nando López's novel La edad de la ira, which is adapted by Lucía Carballal and Juanma Ruiz de Córdoba. Produced by Atresmedia Televisión in collaboration with Big Bang Media (The Mediapro Studio) and Masficción, shooting began on 30 August 2021. The project was presented by the cast members on 2 September 2021 at the FesTVal. The episodes were directed by Jesús Rodrigo and they were fully shot in Madrid (and the Madrid region), including the IES Ramiro de Maeztu.

== Release ==
The series premiered on Atresplayer Premium on 27 February 2022. The weekly broadcasting run wrapped with the release of the fourth and last episode on 20 March 2022.
