= George Flint =

George Flint may refer to:

- George Flint (basketball), American basketball player and coach
- George Flint (American football) (born 1937), American football guard
- George Washington Flint (1844–1921), American academic administrator
- Major George Flint of Mixed Armistice Commissions

== See also ==
- George Flinter, adventurer
- George Flynn (disambiguation)
