= Basilio García =

Spanish military commander (1791–1844)

Basilio Antonio García y Velasco (Ventosa, 1791 - Toulon, 1844), known as "Don Basilio de Logroño" in the newspapers of that time, was a Spanish soldier and Carlist military commander.

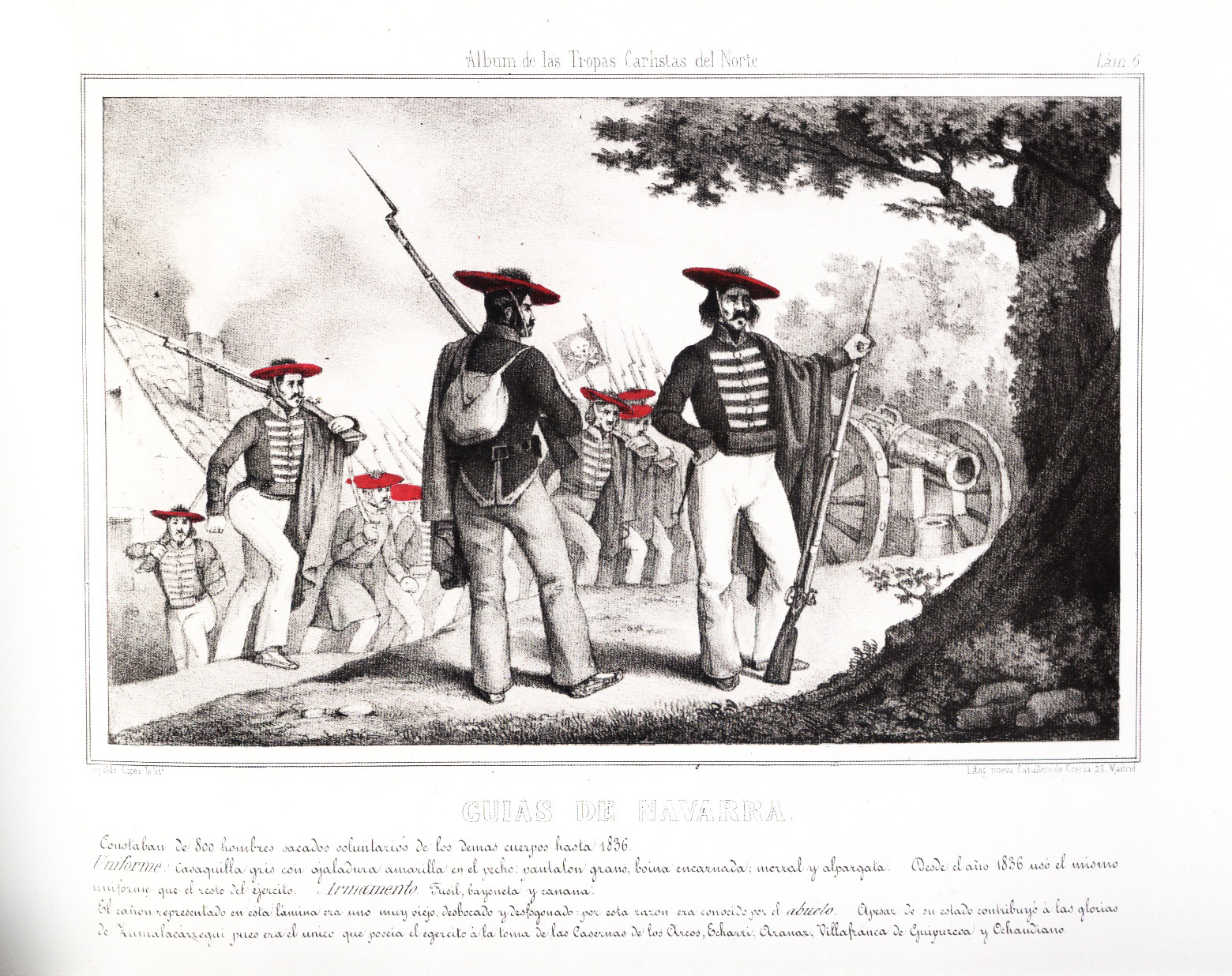
Carlist soldiers from Navarre

== First campaigns ==
He fought in the Spanish War of Independence. During the Trienio Liberal he remained opposed to the liberals and later, during the Ominous Decade, he was the Commissioner of War in the province of Soria. In 1833, he took up the Carlist cause, proclaiming Carlos María Isidro de Borbón to be the King in Logroño.

From 1834 to 1836, he made several short expeditions from Navarre (which was dominated by the Carlists), harrying villages in the valleys of the Cordillera. On one of these expeditions, he lost his son and his lieutenant/chaplain nicknamed "Caloyo", who became a prisoner and was shot by a firing squad in Logroño. During the "Expedición Real" (a campaign in the First Carlist War), he served on the staff of the infante don Sebastián, receiving the rank of General for his actions during the Battle of Villar de los Navarros.

== Failed efforts ==
Following the failure of the "Expedición Real" and without sufficient food for his men, he decided to break away from the main army and join the forces of Ramón Cabrera in the Maestrazgo. He never met up with Cabrera, having been forced to change his route by pursuing government forces. Later, he managed to unite with other Carlist forces and took Úbeda. He once again went his own way, as a result of which he was beaten by government troops in a battle at Baeza. After regrouping, he entered the village of Calzada de Calatrava, burning a church where members of the National Militia had taken refuge with their families. He continued his desperate march, but was surprised in Valdepeñas by the troops of General George Flinter, which was his final undoing. He continued with his few remaining men back to Navarre, where he soon found himself among those who were jeered at for being "ojalateros" (a contemptuous term for men who sat out the war on the sidelines, complaining instead of fighting. It was derived from the word "ojalá"..."I hope")

== Opposition to Maroto ==
In 1839 he obtained the title of "Supreme Advisor for the War", but conflicts with General Rafael Maroto forced him to seek self-exile in France. Disturbed by the malaise he had seen among the troops in Navarre, he soon decided to return and coordinate plans against Maroto. These plans failed and, after the Convention of Vergara was signed, he fled towards France with soldiers of the Sixth Battalion who had rebelled against the Convention and assassinated General Vicente González Moreno. Taking advantage of the confusion caused by the encounter between the soldiers and the border guards, he was able to cross into France. He died in poverty on 26 May 1844, in Toulon.

== Sources ==
- Google Books: Annual Register for 1838 (Chapter XX)
