= George Flynn (disambiguation) =

George Flynn (born 1937) is an American composer and pianist.

George Flynn may also refer to:

- George Flynn (baseball) (1871–1901), baseball player
- George Flynn (movie producer) on Obsessed
- George Flynn (trombonist), jazz trombonist on So Damn Happy etc. and Broadway musician
- George J. Flynn, commander of Marine Corps Cyberspace Command
- George J. Flynn, publisher of Model Rocketry
- George W. Flynn, American physical chemist and professor

== See also ==
- George Flint (disambiguation)
