= Breathless (Spanish TV series) =

Spanish television series

- Spanish: Respira
- Genre: Hospital drama
- Created by: Carlos Montero
- Screenplay by: Carlos Montero; Carlos Ruano; Guillermo Escribano; Pablo Saiz
- Directed by: David Pinillo; Marta Font
- Starring: Najwa Nimri; Aitana Sánchez-Gijón; Blanca Suárez; Manu Ríos
- Country of origin: Spain
- Original language: Spanish
- No. of series: 2
- No. of episodes: 16

Production
- Executive producers: Carlos Montero Castiñeira; Diego Betancor
- Production company: El Desorden Crea

Original release
- Network: Netflix
- Release: 30 August 2024 – present

Breathless (Spanish: Respira) is a Spanish hospital drama television series created by Carlos Montero. It stars Najwa Nimri, Aitana Sánchez-Gijón, Blanca Suárez, Manu Ríos, and Borja Luna. It was made available to stream on Netflix from 30 August 2024.

The series was announced in July 2023. Principal photography commenced in August 2023 and ended in February 2024.

In December 2024, the series was renewed for a second season, which premiered on October 31, 2025. In November 2025 it was announced that Respira would return for a third and final season.

== Premise ==
The series is set in and around the Joaquín Sorolla public hospital in Valencia, Spain. Besides the usual medical and personal themes of hospital dramas, the show also delves into the politics and economics of health care in Spain.

== Cast ==
- Najwa Nimri as Patricia Segura
- Aitana Sánchez-Gijón as Pilar Amaro
- Manu Ríos as Biel de Felipe
- Borja Luna as Néstor Moa
- Ana Rayo as Leonor "Leo" Santapau
- Alfonso Bassave as Lluís Bonet
- Xoán Fórneas as Enrique "Quique" Román
- Macarena de Rueda as Rocío Fuster
- Marwa Bakhat as May
- Blanca Martínez as Blanca
- Abril Zamora as Neus (seasons 1–2)
- Víctor Sáinz as Rodrigo Donoso (season 1)
- Javier Ballesteros as Emilio Alto
- Blanca Suárez as Jésica Donoso
- Rachel Lascar as Sophie (season 2)
- Gustavo Salmerón as Nicolás de Felipe (season 2)
- Pablo Alborán as Jon Balanzetegui (seasons 2–3)
- Alex Medina as Hugo (season 1)
- Claudia Traisac as Lucía Haros (seasons 2–3)
- Belén Cuesta as Judit Casat (season 3)
- Asia Ortega (season 3)
- Carlos González (season 3)
- Albert Salazar (season 3)
- Nacho Fresneda (season 3)

== Episodes ==
| No. | Title | Directed by | Written by | Original release date | U.S. viewers (millions) |
|---|---|---|---|---|---|
| 1 | "Por encima de todo" | David Pinillos | David Pinillos | August 30, 2024 | N/A |
| 2 | "Madera de médico" | David Pinillos | Carlos Montero & Carlos Ruano | August 30, 2024 | N/A |
| 3 | "Páramos" | David Pinillos | Carlos Ruano | August 30, 2024 | N/A |
| 4 | "Confío en ti" | David Pinillos | Carlos Ruano & Pablo Paiz | August 30, 2024 | N/A |
| 5 | "Huelga" | Marta Font | Guillermo Escribano | August 30, 2024 | N/A |
| 6 | "El último hombre en pie" | Marta Font | Carlos Ruano & Pablo Paiz | August 30, 2024 | N/A |
| 7 | "Tierra quemada" | Marta Font | Guillermo Escribano & Carlos Montero | August 30, 2024 | N/A |
| 8 | "Gota fría" | David Pinillos | Carlos Ruano | August 30, 2024 | N/A |

== Production ==
The eight-part series is from Carlos Montero Castiñeira, who is the show's creator and showrunner. A production of El Desorden Crea, the series is executive produced by Carlos Montero Castiñeira and Diego Betancor. It is directed by David Pinillo and Marta Font, and written by Montero, Carlos Ruano, Guillermo Escribano, and Pablo Saiz.

The cast includes Najwa Nimri, Aitana Sánchez-Gijón, Blanca Suárez, Manu Ríos and Abril Zamora. In December 2024, it was announced that Netflix had renewed the series for a second season, with French actress Rachel Lascar and Spanish singer Pablo Alborán being cast in new roles. Later reports confirmed that Gustavo Salmerón and Claudia Traisac had also joined the cast in said season. In February 2026, Netflix renewed the show for a third season, later confirmed to be the final. Filming began in May 2026, with Belén Cuesta, Asia Ortega, Carlos González, Albert Salazar and Nacho Fresneda joining as series regulars, while Alborán and Traisac would be reprising their roles. At the same time, Zamora revealed that she would not be returning for the third season due to scheduling conflicts with other projects.

== Broadcast ==
The series premiered globally on Netflix on 30 August 2024. The second season was released on 31 October 2025.

== Reception ==
On the review aggregator website Rotten Tomatoes, Breathless holds an approval rating of 71%.

Rebecca Cook writing for Digital Spy warned that the show may not be for those who are particularly squeamish given the nature of some of the hospital scenes, but along with the impossibly good looking people and the relationship drama there is also a political message of the pressure on a health service. She states that "some "will likely be put off by the politicking and the gore, while hardline medical procedural fans will guffaw at some of the plot contrivances… fans of Grey's Anatomy looking for something fresh-faced on a similar soapy level will relish the melodrama".
