= Livraria Lello =

Bookstore in Porto, Portugal

Lello Bookstore
- Livraria Lello
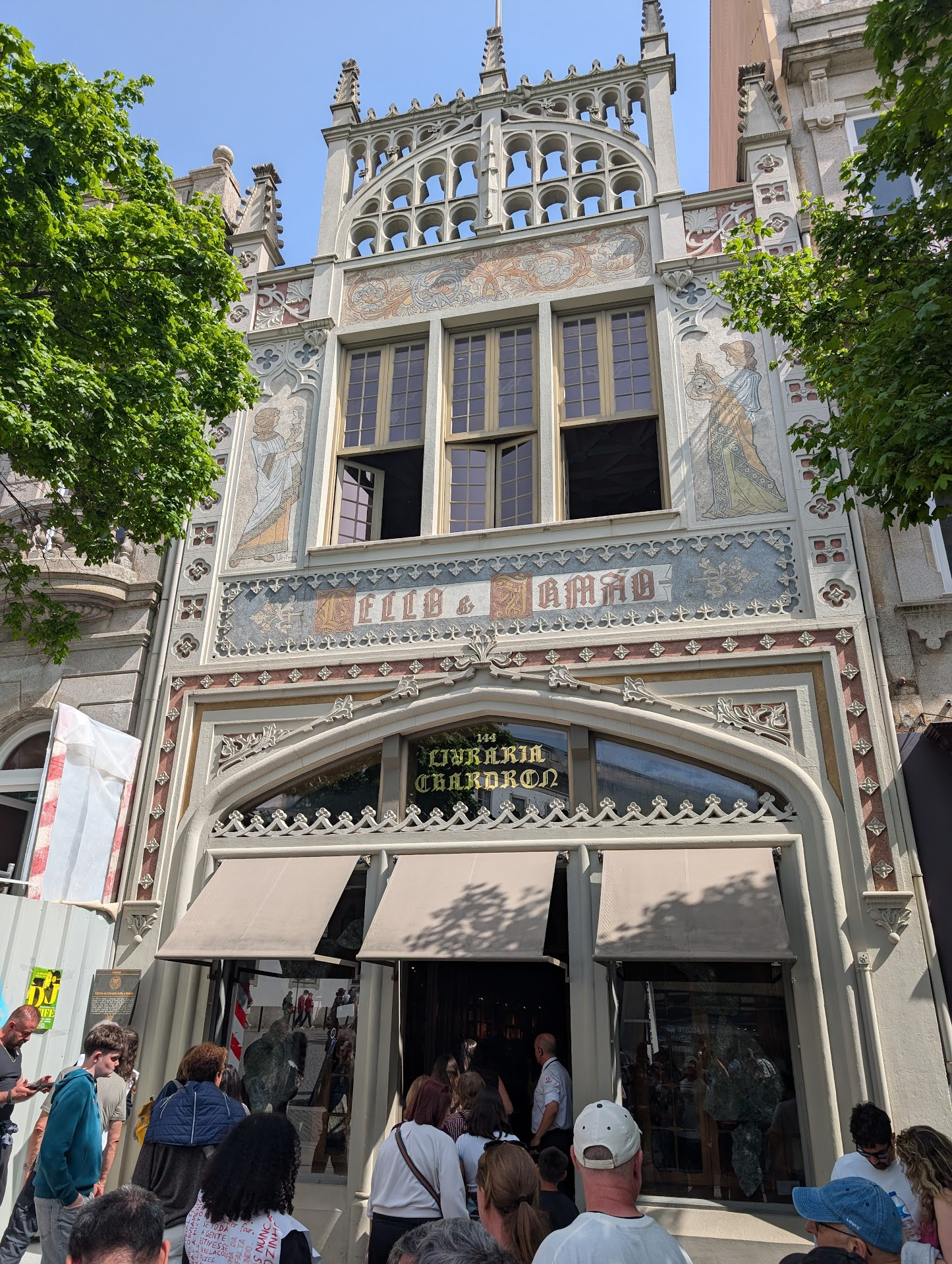
- The principal facade following restoration in 2016

General information
- Type: Bookstore
- Architectural style: Neo-Manueline
- Location: Cedofeita, Santo Ildefonso, Sé, Miragaia, São Nicolau e Vitória, Portugal
- Coordinates: 41°8′49″N 8°36′53″W
- Opened: 1881
- Owner: Aurora Pinto

Technical details
- Material: Granite

Design and construction
- Architect: Francisco Xavier Esteves

The Livraria Lello & Irmão (formerly Livraria Chardron, until 1919), commonly known in English as the Lello Bookshop, is a bookshop located in the civil parish of Cedofeita, Santo Ildefonso, Sé, Miragaia, São Nicolau e Vitória, in the northern Portuguese municipality of Porto.

Along with Bertrand in Lisbon, it is one of the oldest bookstores in Portugal and frequently rated among the top bookstores in the world (placing third in lists by guidebook publisher Lonely Planet and The Guardian).

== History ==
In 1869, the Livraria Internacional de Ernesto Chardron was founded, from a shop on Rua dos Clérigos by the Frenchman Ernesto Chardron. Following its founder's death, at the age of 45, the firm was sold to Lugan & Genelioux Sucessores.

Alternately, in 1881, José Lello along with his brother-in-law created the firm David Pereira & Lello. But, the following year, after the death of David Lourenço Pereira, the establishment began to be operated as José Pinto de Sousa Lello & Irmão, when he partnered with his younger brother (António Lello). The brothers were born to a property-owner in Villa Ramadas (Fontes), in the municipality of Santa Marta de Penaguião: both became prominent members of Porto's intellectual bourgeoisie by the turn of the century.

In 1891, the Chardron Bookstore acquired the establishments of A. R. da Cruz Coutinho and other bookstores in the city. This ultimately led to Mathieux Lugan selling his share in the Chardon bookstore to the brothers Lello, in 1894. These purchases later included the 7 April 1898 sale of the firm Livraria Lemos & Co.

The brothers hired engineer Francisco Xavier Esteves (1864–1944) to construct the new bookstore on Rua das Carmelitas. In 1906, the Livraria Lello was inaugurated.

By 1919, the bookstore was simply designated as the Lello & Irmão, Lda. With the 1930 addition of José Pereira da Costa, the bookstore began to be known simply as Livraria Lello. But, between 1930 and 1940, it once again became designated Lello & Irmão.

On 14 December 1981, there was a proposal to classify the store by the Delegação Regional do Norte (Northern Regional Delegation) of the Secretary-of-State for Culture. It took almost a decade, before a dispatch was issued by the IPPAR presidency to open a process of classification (on 28 September 1993). The IPPAR consultative council favoured its establishment as a Imóvel de Interesse Público (Property of Public Interest) pm 24 March 1994.

In 1995, Lello & Irmão created a new society: Prólogo Livreiros S.A., which preceded its reopening on 15 March 1995, following a period of restoration and remodelling.

The Secretary-of-State for Culture solicited a presentation on 14 March 2011 to establish a special protection zone (ZEP) the site, which was supplemented by the DRCNorte (on 12 April). The proposal was seen as a positive initiative by the National Cultural Council on 31 May. The ZEP decision was published on 28 January 2013 (Announcement 35/2013, Diário da República, Série 2, 19).

In 2014, Avelino and Aurora Pedro Pinto, owners of the Lionesa Group, acquired 51% of the society, having acquired the entire capital of Livraria Lello in 2023.

Beginning in July 2015, the bookstore began requesting entrance fees for visitors. On 21 April 2016, an artistic mural was erected to conceal the scaffolding placed on the facade of the building, during its restoration, by graffiti writer Dheo and colleague Pariz One. Dheo painted the central area of the mural with a pile of old books, a lit candle and a bottle of Port wine, while the rest was painted by Pariz One with geometric shapes, referring to the stained glass inside the bookstore. The work took two months to produce. On 31 July, following the restoration, the main facade of the building was uncovered, showing the laboratory-tested recovered primitive gray.

In 2022, a collection of touching and sometimes prescient personal letters written by a young Bob Dylan to a high school girlfriend has been sold at auction to Lello bookshop for nearly $670,000.

The Manifesto Library, of banned and censored books, reside at the bookshop, in "partnership" with Dua Lipa. Its permanent collection is co-curated by Service95 and bookshop staff.

== Architecture ==
The bookstore is flanked by shops and fronts the Praça de Lisboa, near to the Porto University Faculty of Sciences building, the tower and Clérigos Church.

The rectangular plan covers two-stories, representing a simple mass, covered in tiled roof. Its principal facade is oriented to the south, towards the Ruas das Carmelitas and related to the Praça de Lisboa. The building's exterior has a mixed architectural suggesting Neo-Gothic, and Art Nouveau elements, and in the interior, implied Art Deco elements.

On the first floor, it includes bated arch, divided into three vains, with the central arch providing entrance into the building and decorative lateral windows, each surmounted by flag adapted to the archway. Above this arch are three elongated rectangular windows flanked by two painted figures representing "Art" and "Science" (work of Professor Jose Bielman).

Finishing the facade are squared plaits surmounted by three decorated pinnacles, with two pilasters on either side, topped by pinnacles of equal design. Decorative elements complete the facade with alternating geometric shapes that circuit and the firm's name LELLO & BROTHER over the bow, all painted in vivid colours that highlight the white paint on the facade.

=== Interior ===
The ample interior space is marked by a forked staircase connecting to a gallery on the first floor with detailed wood balusters.

Over this staircase is a large 8-by-3.5-metre (26 ft × 11 ft) stained glass window, with the central motto Decus in Labore and monogram of the owners.

The ceiling and interiors are treated exhaustively with painted plaster, designed to resemble sculpted wood surfaces and decorative elements.

The building still retains the rails and wooden cart once used to move books around the store between the shelves.

== Gallery ==
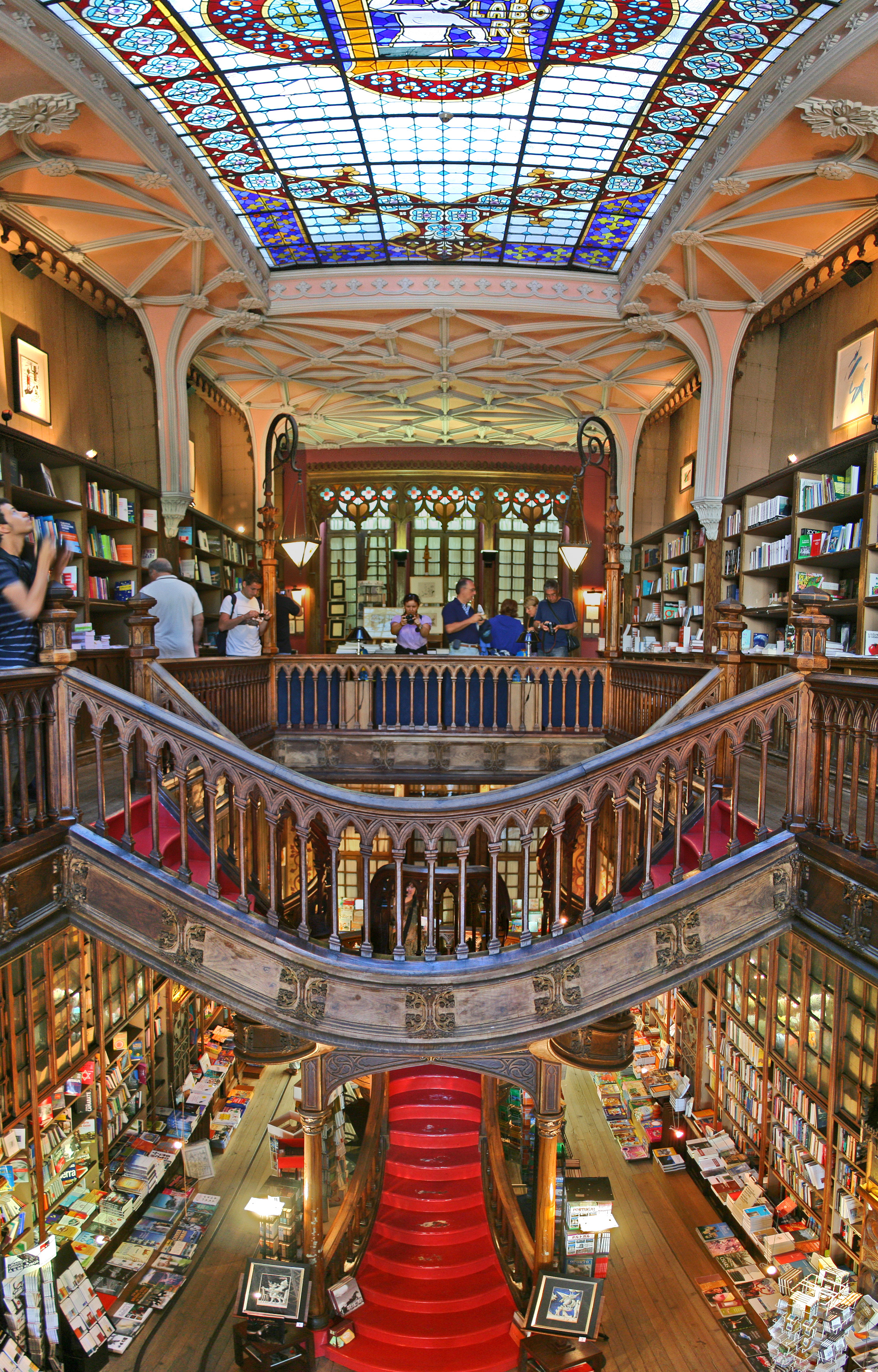
The interior of the store, showing skylight, staircase and book shelves

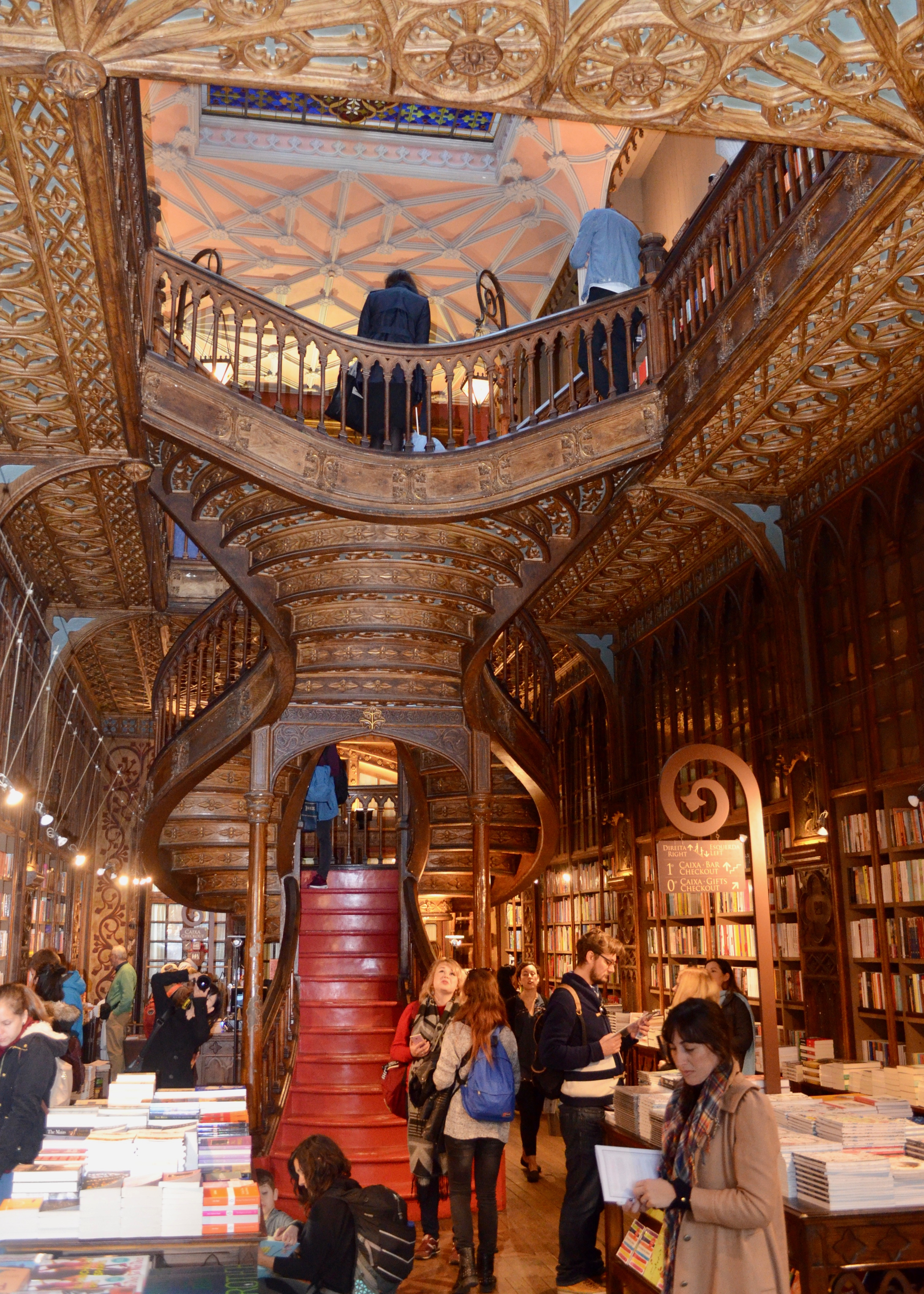
The famous staircase to the second floor shelves

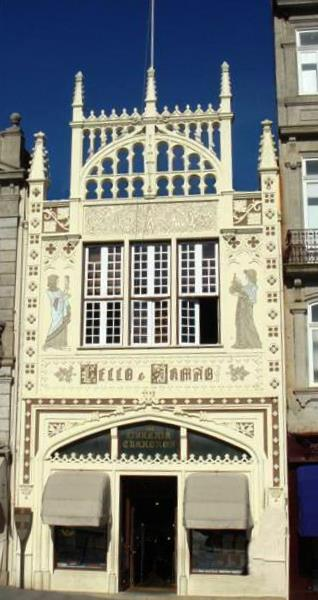
Livraria Lello (or Livraria Chardron), Porto

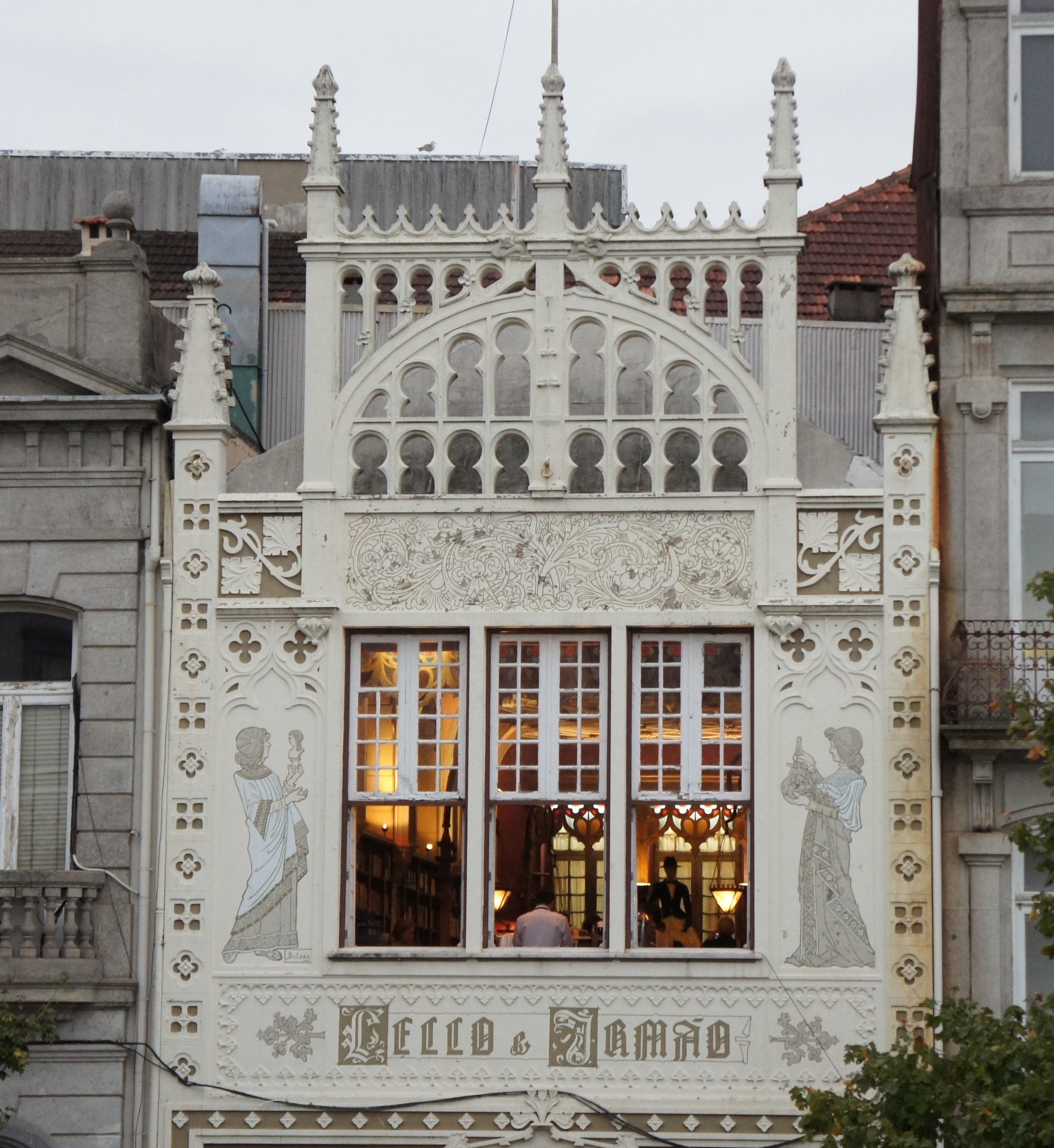
The detail of the Lello bookstore pinnacles and stained-glass windows

== Bibliography ==
- Cardoso, Margarida David (2016-07-21), "Livraria Lello acordou de cara lavada, como era há 110 anos", Público (in Portuguese), p. 61
- "Livraria Lello", Jornal Público (in Portuguese), Porto, Portugal, 1995-03-15
- "Mural de arte urbana vai "tapar" livraria Lello", Público (in Portuguese), Porto, Portugal, 2016-04-21, p. 14
