= Strange Way of Life =

2023 short film by Pedro Almodóvar

- Theatrical release poster
- Spanish: Extraña forma de vida
- Directed by: Pedro Almodóvar
- Written by: Pedro Almodóvar
- Produced by: Agustín Almodóvar; Esther García
- Starring: Ethan Hawke; Pedro Pascal
- Cinematography: José Luis Alcaine
- Edited by: Teresa Font
- Music by: Alberto Iglesias
- Production companies: El Deseo; Saint Laurent Productions
- Distributed by: BTeam Pictures
- Release dates: 17 May 2023 (Cannes); 26 May 2023 (Spain)
- Running time: 31 minutes
- Country: Spain
- Languages: English; Spanish
- Box office: $1.1 million

Strange Way of Life (Spanish: Extraña forma de vida) is a 2023 Spanish Western drama short film written and directed by Pedro Almodóvar. It stars Ethan Hawke and Pedro Pascal as two gunslingers who reunite after 25 years. The film marks Almodóvar's second English-language effort, following The Human Voice (2020).

Strange Way of Life premiered at the Cannes Film Festival on 17 May 2023. It was released theatrically in Spain on 26 May 2023 by BTeam Pictures. The film received generally favourable reviews from critics.

== Plot ==
After 25 years' absence, Silva rides a horse across the desert to visit his friend Jake who is now the Sheriff of a small Wild West town. Jake is informed by one of the town residents that the suspect in the recent murder of his brother's widow who was last seen leaving her home looked like her violent boyfriend Joe. Sworn to look after his brother's wife, Jake takes it upon himself to arrest her killer personally. He is surprised when Silva shows up, and the two have dinner and reminisce about their youth before having sex. The next morning, Silva tries to remind Jake of his idea of the two of them owning a ranch together, but Jake rebuffs him, accusing Silva of trying to use him: Joe is Silva's son, and he suspects Silva has only arrived in town now after being gone for 25 years to help Joe escape. They argue and Silva leaves to find Joe. Jake follows him and the two men separately recall an afternoon in their youth when they first had sex.

The next day, Silva finds Joe at home on his ranch and angrily excoriates him, giving him just enough money and a horse to cross to Mexico, telling him to never return. Jake surprises Joe and the two fight, until they both pull their revolvers out on one another. Silva pulls a rifle on Joe, warning him not to shoot Jake and to take the horse and go. He does so, but as Jake moves to fire on Joe, Silva shoots Jake clean through the flesh of his waist. He drags Jake into the house and tends to his wound, telling him the shot has been clean and that he will be fine. Jake says he will have Silva arrested for attempted murder, but Silva counters that his missing the shot and subsequently tending to Jake's wound would throw that motive out. As they sit there, Silva recalls that Jake once asked him what two men could possibly do together on a ranch alone, and Silva tells him that they could keep each other company and take care of one another.

== Cast ==
- Ethan Hawke as Sheriff Jake
  - Jason Fernández as young Jake
- Pedro Pascal as Silva
  - José Condessa as young Silva
- Pedro Casablanc as the carpenter
- Manu Ríos as the singer
- George Steane as Joe
- Sara Sálamo as Conchita
- Oihana Cueto as Calixta
- Daniela Medina as Patricia

== Production ==
In June 2022, it was announced that Ethan Hawke and Pedro Pascal would star in Pedro Almodóvar's short film A Strange Way of Life. It is produced by Almodóvar's El Deseo in association with Yves Saint Laurent, whose head designer Anthony Vaccarello also served as an associate producer and the film's costume designer. Almódovar worked with recurring collaborators such as cinematographer José Luis Alcaine and composer Alberto Iglesias, whilst Teresa Font took over film editing. The film is titled after a 1960s Portuguese fado song by Amália Rodrigues.

Speaking on Dua Lipa's podcast At Your Service, Almodóvar described the film thus:

"A queer Western, in the sense that there are two men and they love each other. It's about masculinity in a deep sense because the Western is a male genre. What I can tell you about the film is that it has a lot of the elements of the Western. It has the gunslinger, it has the ranch, it has the sheriff, but what it has that most Westerns don't have is the kind of dialogue that I don't think a Western film has ever captured between two men."

Principal photography began in August 2022 in the Tabernas Desert, southern Spain and wrapped in September.

== Release ==
Strange Way of Life premiered in the Special Screenings section of the Cannes Film Festival on 17 May 2023. It was also screened in the Acclaimed section of the 27th Lima Film Festival on 13 August 2023. In advance of its North American release, the film was screened at the 2023 Toronto International Film Festival in September as part of a special "In Conversation With..." event with Almodóvar.

The film was released theatrically in Spain on 26 May 2023 by BTeam Pictures. Mubi distributed the film in Italy and Latin America, while Pathé released it in the United Kingdom. Sony Pictures Classics released the film in the United States on 6 October 2023, releasing it also in other markets (excluding France, Belgium, Switzerland and markets already covered by BTeam, Mubi and Pathé).

This is the last Almodóvar film to be distributed by the UK branch of Pathé before it exited the British film market in November 2023 (one month after the film's release).

== Reception ==
=== Critical response ===
On the review aggregator website Rotten Tomatoes, 77% of 97 critics' reviews are positive, with an average rating of 7.1/10. The website's consensus reads: "A tantalizing glimpse of the bond between two people, the well-acted Strange Way of Life adds a brief but still rewarding chapter to Pedro Almodóvar's filmography."

Peter Bradshaw of The Guardian described the film in his four-star review as "a queer Western with a hint of kink", adding that "there is some very robust and old-fashioned storytelling here and Strange Way of Life feels quite old-fashioned in its way."

Pete Hammond of Deadline Hollywood praised Hawke and Pascal for bringing "authenticity and a believable lived-in feel to their characters and this relationship", while David Fear of Rolling Stone reviewed Strange Way of Life as "a provocative movie that brings out the best in both of its leads".

In his negative review for Variety, Peter Debruge called the film "a glorified fashion commercial" for Yves Saint Laurent, adding that "the use of models instead of actors betrays what this really is: a branding exercise, both for Almodóvar and costumier Vaccarello, plus two stars eager to show their allyship."

=== Accolades ===
Award or film festival	Date of ceremony	Category	Recipient(s)	Result	Ref(s)
Cannes Film Festival	26 May 2023	Queer Palm	Pedro Almodóvar	Nominated	
Astra Film and Creative Awards	6 January 2024	Best Short Film	Strange Way of Life	Nominated	
