= Beguinas =

- Promotional release poster
- Genre: Period drama; Romantic drama
- Directed by: Rómulo Aguillaume; Claudia Pinto
- Starring: Amaia Aberasturi; Yon González
- Country of origin: Spain
- Original language: Spanish

Production
- Executive producers: Montse García; Sonia Martínez; Amparo Miralles
- Production companies: Atresmedia TV; Buendía Estudios

Original release
- Network: Atresplayer
- Release: 28 April 2024

Beguinas is a Spanish period drama and romance television series starring Amaia Aberasturi and Yon González. Set in the 16th century, the plot is inspired by the communities of Beguines. It debuted on Atresplayer on 28 April 2024.

== Premise ==
Set in 1559 Segovia, the plot follows the events after the ceremony of the arranged engagement of Lucía de Avellaneda with the Marquis of Peñarrosa. Via an unexpected letter from her mother, Lucía comes into contact with the communities of Beguines, leaving her former life behind, also committing to an impossible romance with crypto-Jew Telmo Medina.

== Cast ==
- Amaia Aberasturi as Lucía de Avellaneda
- Yon González as Telmo Medina
- Beatriz Segura as Marie Anne
- Jaime Olías as Munio de Avellaneda, Count of Vellaví
- Silma López as Juana Aranda
- Ella Kweku as Guiomar Ruy
- Melani Olivares as Sibila García
- Meritxell Calvo as Jimena Suárez de Córdoba
- Laura Galán as Catalina
- Ignacio Montes as Gonzalo de Grijalvo
- Jonás Berami as Lebrín Aranda
- Javier Beltrán as Rodrigo de Guzmán, Marquis of Peñarrosa
- Elisabet Gelabert as Lucrecia de Avellaneda
- Cristina Plazas as Gabriela Grijalvo
- Antonio Durán "Morris" as Padre Lasarte
- Lucía Caraballo as Beatriz García
- Jorge Kent as Comisario Utrera

== Production ==
Irene Rodríguez, Esther Morales, Silvia Arribas, and Virginia Llera took over writing duties. An Atresmedia TV and Buendía Estudios production, the 10-episode series is executively produced by Montse García, Sonia Martínez, and Amparo Miralles. Rómulo Aguillaume and Claudia Pinto were tasked with the direction of the episodes. Filming began in Segovia.

== Release ==
The series was presented at the Cádiz-based South International Series Festival in October 2023. It premiered on Atresplayer on 28 April 2024. It will be aired afterwards on Antena 3.

== See also ==
- 2024 in Spanish television
