= Calzada de Calatrava =

- Municipality
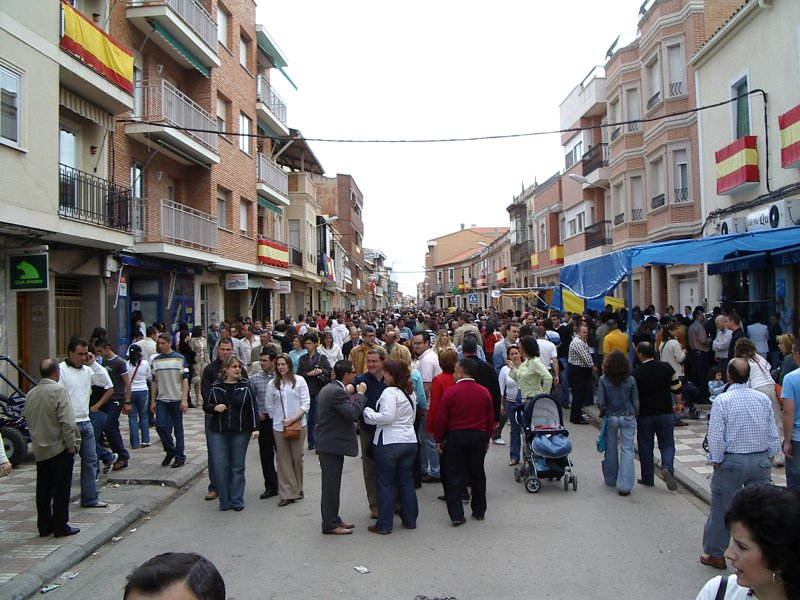
- Calle Real

- Flag Coat of arms
- Interactive map of Calzada de Calatrava
- Location of Calzada de Calatrava in mainland Spain
- Coordinates: 38°42′14″N 3°46′35″W
- Country: Spain
- Autonomous Community: Castilla–La Mancha
- Province: Ciudad Real

Government
  - Type: Ayuntamiento
  - Body: Ayuntamiento de Calzada de Calatrava
  - Mayor: Félix Martín Acevedo (PP)

Area
  - Total: 411 km^{2} (159 sq mi)
- Elevation (AMSL): 646 m (2,119 ft)

Population (2025-01-01)
  - Total: 3,668
  - Density: 8.92/km^{2} (23.1/sq mi)
- Demonym(s): calzadeño, -ña
- Time zone: UTC+1 (CET)
  - Summer (DST): UTC+2 (CEST)
- Postal code: 13370
- Area code: +34 (Spain) + (Ciudad Real)

Calzada de Calatrava is a municipality of Spain located in the province of Ciudad Real, autonomous community of Castilla–La Mancha. It belongs to the Campo de Calatrava traditional comarca. In 2024 it had 3,742 inhabitants.

== History ==
Between the Sacred Convent of Calatrava la Nueva and the Castle of Salvatierra there was population and for its defense it had two castles, therefore, it can be assured that it was founded in the first decades of the 13th century, with which, Calzada de Calatrava grew to the shadow and shelter as logistic support of the Castle of Calatrava la Nueva and the Order of Calatrava with its knights, friars and soldiers. The Order of Calatrava monitored and commanded throughout this area until the time of the Catholic Monarchs, the lands remained their property as well as many privileges, however numerous archaeological sites that confirm the human presence in this area from the Lower Paleolithic. Although no scientific excavations have been carried out, in various surface surveys some polyhedral cores have been found in the place known as El Alamo, as well as raedera and lascas have been documented in what is known as Casa Calle, located to the north and northeast respectively.

The Alamo, located in an elevated area near the Vega de Castellanos stream, before reaching the Parra mill on the Jabalón River, is the most important site that extends from the Neolithic to the Bronze Age. In him certain parallels are found with some nearby deposits in Aldea del Rey, in which, among other materials, polished axes and millstones stand out.

The remains were found in the area of the Güedos (polished stone), as well as those found in El Prado (to the north), Pozo Felipe (to the east), and the Neolithic ax found in Cabeza del Encinar (to the south).

During the First Carlist War, the Carlist expedition under Basilio García, who had left Navarra on December 29, 1837, ravaging the lands of both Castillas, was presented on February 25, 1838 in Calzada in front of some 5,000 men. The liberal defenders, both from Calzada and from neighboring towns that had sought refuge here, were locked in the Santa Maria Nuestra Señora del Valle Parish Church, outside the town walls with their women and children. The Carlists, with their artillery, demolished the doors, introduced beams of wood and other woods to which they set fire. The prisoners did not accept giving up and the vault eventually collapsed, resulting in the death of 110 men, 25 women and 29 children. The plot of the church was subsequently used as a cemetery, then as a Civil Guard barracks and is currently a park where you can still see some stone blocks of the old church.

On January 22, 1895 the regent queen Maria Cristina of Habsburg on behalf of her son, King Alfonso XIII, granted the title of city to the village of La Calzada.

In 2011, on the occasion of the World Youth Day, the Pope's cross and the icon visited this town.

== Notable people ==
- Fray Jorge de la Calzada
- Abul Nuaym Ridwan
- Pedro Almodóvar, director.
- Paco Racionero, actor.
- Jose Vicente Romero Camacho, composer.
- Mateo Casado Real, poet.
- Manu Ríos, actor.
