= Ventosa, La Rioja =

Ventosa
- Municipality
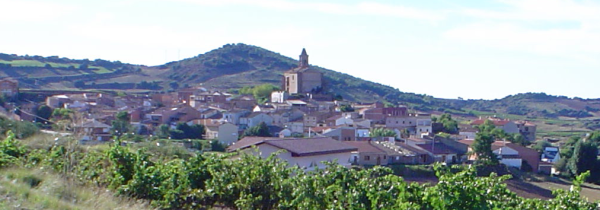
- Skyline of Ventosa

- Location within La Rioja, Spain Location within Spain
- Coordinates: 42°24′14″N 2°37′35″W
- Country: Spain
- Autonomous community: La Rioja
- Comarca: Logroño

Government
  - Mayor: Ricardo Velasco García (PSOE)

Area
  - Total: 9.63 km^{2} (3.72 sq mi)
- Elevation: 642 m (2,106 ft)

Population (2025-01-01)
  - Total: 196
- Demonym(s): ventosino, na
- Postal code: 26371
- Website: www.aytoventosa.org

Ventosa is a village in the province and autonomous community of La Rioja, Spain. The municipality covers an area of 9.63 square kilometres (3.72 sq mi) and as of 2011 had a population of 166 people.

== Politics ==
List of mayors since the democratic elections of 1979
| Term | Mayor | Political party |
|---|---|---|
| 1979–1983 | José Antonio Velasco Ochoa | PSOE |
| 1983–1987 | José Antonio Velasco Ochoa | PSOE |
| 1987–1991 | José Antonio Velasco Ochoa | PSOE |
| 1991–1995 | José Antonio Velasco Ochoa | PSOE |
| 1995–1999 | José Antonio Velasco Ochoa | PSOE |
| 1999–2003 | José Antonio Velasco Ochoa | PSOE |
| 2003–2007 | Ricardo Velasco García | PSOE |
| 2007–2011 | Ricardo Velasco García | PSOE |
| 2011–2015 | Ricardo Velasco García | PSOE |
| 2015–2019 | Ricardo Velasco García | PSOE |
| 2019–2023 | Ricardo Velasco García | PSOE |
| 2023– | n/d | n/d |

== Notable people ==
- Francisco de Esquivel y Aldana
- Basilio Antonio García y Velasco
