= Welcome to Eden =

Spanish thriller television series

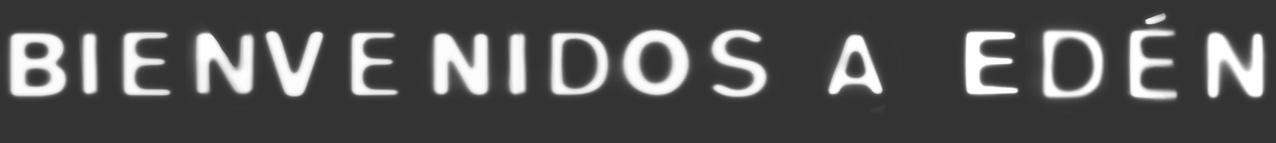
- Spanish: Bienvenidos a Edén
- Genre: Drama; Thriller
- Created by: Joaquín Górriz; Guillermo López
- Directed by: Daniel Benmayor; Menna Fité
- Starring: Amaia Aberasturi; Tomy Aguilera; Diego Garisa; Berta Castañé; Albert Baró; Lola Rodríguez; Guillermo Pfening; Blanca Romero; Begoña Vargas; Sergio Momo; Ana Mena; Berta Vázquez; Irene Dev; Álex Pastrana; Joan Pedrola; Claudia Trujillo; Carlos Soroa; Jonathan Alonso; Dariam Coco; Amaia Salamanca; Belinda; Mario de la Rosa; Ana Wagener; Nona Sobo; Lucía Guerrero; Max Sampietro; Anna Alarcón; Carlos Torres
- Country of origin: Spain
- Original language: Spanish
- No. of seasons: 2
- No. of episodes: 16

Production
- Running time: 40–45 minutes
- Production company: Brutal Media

Original release
- Network: Netflix
- Release: 6 May 2022 – 21 April 2023

Welcome to Eden (Spanish: Bienvenidos a Edén) is a Spanish thriller television series created by Joaquín Górriz and Guillermo López Sánchez for Netflix. It premiered on 6 May 2022. A second season was released on 21 April 2023. On 7 July 2023, the series was cancelled and will not be returning for a third season.

== Cast ==
=== Main ===
- Amaia Aberasturi as Zoa Rey Gómez-Fajardo
- Tomy Aguilera as Juan Carlos "Charly" Escudero
- Diego Garisa (Note: Diego Garisa is credited in the main cast from 1x01 to 2x06.) as Ibón Arregui
- Berta Castañé as Gabi Rey Gómez-Fajardo
- Albert Baró (Note: Albert Baró is credited in the main cast from 1x01 to 1x03. In the second season, he is credited in 2x08.) as Aldo Roig Muro
- Lola Rodríguez as Mayka
- Guillermo Pfening as Erick
- Blanca Romero as Roberta Gómez-Fajardo (season 1; guest season 2) (Note: Blanca Romero is credited in the main cast in the episodes in which she appears.)
- Begoña Vargas as Bel
- Sergio Momo (Note: Sergio Momo is credited in the main cast from 1x01 to 2x03.) as Nicolás "Nico"
- Ana Mena (Note: Ana Mena is credited in the main cast in the episodes in which she appears.) as Judith (season 1)
- Berta Vázquez as Claudia (season 1) (Note: Berta Vázquez is credited in the main cast from 1x01 to 1x06.)
- Irene Dev as Alma
- Alex Pastrana as Ulises Gracia Delgado (Note: Alex Pastrana is credited in the main cast from 1x01 to 2x02.)
- Joan Pedrola as Orson Schnede
- Claudia Trujillo as Brenda (Note: Claudia Trujillo is credited in the main cast from 1x01 to 2x01.)
- Carlos Soroa as Eloy
- Jonathan Alonso (Note: Jonathan Alonso is credited in the main cast from 1x01 to 2x04.) as Saúl
- Dariam Coco as Eva
- Amaia Salamanca as Astrid Bartos Sepúlveda
- Belinda as África Guadalupe López (Note: Credited as "Special Collaboration")
- Mario de la Rosa as Manuel Rey (season 1) (Note: Credited as "Special Collaboration" in the episodes in which he appears.)
- Ana Wagener as Brisa Galván (Note: Credited as "Special Collaboration" in the episodes in which she appears.)
- Nona Sobo as Som Susik (season 2)
- Lucía Guerrero as Danae (season 2; guest season 1)
- Max Sampietro as Isaac (season 2; recurring season 1)
- Anna Alarcón as Nuria (season 2; guest season 1)
- Carlos Torres as Joel (season 2) (Note: Credited as "Special Collaboration")

=== Recurring ===
- Jason Fernández as David (season 1)
- César Mateo as Lucas (season 1)
- Martí Atance as Fran (season 1)
- Josean Bengoetxea as Pete (season 1)
- Óscar Foronda as Ernesto Arregui
- Aida de Sàrraga as one of the scapegoats for Ulises' murder (season 2)
- Adrián Grösser as León (season 2; guest season 1)
- Eudald Font as Luís Escudero (season 2; guest season 1)

== Production ==
Welcome to Eden was created by Joaquín Górriz and Guillermo López. The series was produced by Brutal Media. The shooting locations in Spain included the province of Teruel, the island Lanzarote and San Sebastián. The episodes were directed by Daniel Benmayor and Menna Fité.

On 25 May 2022, Netflix reported that the series was renewed for a second season, with Carlos Torres and Nona Sobo as cast additions, and Denis Rovira and Juanma Pachón in charge of the direction of the new episodes.

== Release ==
The series premiered on 6 May 2022 on Netflix.

== Series overview ==
Season	Episodes	Originally released	
Season	Episodes	First released	Last released
1	8	6 May 2022	6 May 2022
2	8	21 April 2023	21 April 2023

== Episodes ==
=== Season 1 (2022) ===
No.	Title	Directed by	Written by	Original release date
1	"El viaje de tu vida" ("The Trip of Your Life")	Daniel Benmayor	Joaquín Górriz and Guillermo López Sánchez	6 May 2022
Zoa, seeking to escape her addict mother and absent father, accepts an invitation to an exclusive, secretive festival on a mysterious island. Her best friend Judith invites herself which is against the contract Zoa signed. Arriving on the island, all partygoers are given a wristband. Later, several wristbands light up and the people are given a mysterious drink - Blue Eden. Fran, one of the island members who disagrees with its methods, is tortured for disobedience, which is witnessed by a shocked Judith. Zoa wakes up the next day to discover she and four others are the only ones left on the island. Zoa, Africa, Ibon, Charly, and a suspicious Aldo are invited to stay on Eden by Astrid - the leader. Judith wakes up alone and confused, but she is quickly grabbed by an unseen assailant.
2	"Evaluación" ("Evaluation")	Menna Fité	Joaquín Górriz and Guillermo López Sánchez	6 May 2022
Fran tries to escape the island but is caught and executed. Aldo is highly suspicious and doubtful of the foundation's intentions. Zoa is directed to Module 8 where she meets her roommates Nico, who had saved her the night of the festival, and the soft-spoken Claudia. Still worried about Judith, Zoa asks Orson about her whereabouts, but he feigns ignorance. Ibón and Alma bond over their love of playing piano. Zoa is later chosen to do an evaluation in which she describes her life: she and her little sister Gabi had to take care of themselves. Their parents got divorced due to their mother's heroin addiction, something that made Zoa feel bad about Gabi getting her hopes up since she would get excited every time her mother left the rehab clinic, only for her to relapse again. Astrid then made Zoa repeat out loud that her mother hated her. Gabi, on the other hand, is upset that Zoa doesn't show up for her 16th birthday. During nightfall, Zoa sees a little boy who quickly vanishes before she can look closely.
3	"Fiesta de despedida" ("Farewell Party")	Menna Fité	Joaquín Górriz and Guillermo López Sánchez	6 May 2022
Ulises, the foundation's head of security, lets the five new members know that the weather had cleared and the boat would arrive at noon the next day to pick them up. Still suspicious, Aldo accuses Ulises of lying to them and decides to plan his own escape. He gets into a boat, but is caught by Brenda who shoots him in the head, killing him. Astrid and her husband Erick take an interest in África. During the farewell party, Alma helps Ibón confront his fears and makes an impressive piano performance; the two admit their feelings for each other and kiss. Claudia tells Charly that he and their friends will never leave the island. Gabi realizes that Zoa's warnings about her mother relapsing might make sense after she shows little interest about her disappearance.
4	"La otra orilla" ("The Other Shore")	Daniel Benmayor	Joaquín Górriz and Guillermo López Sánchez	6 May 2022
Zoa grows suspicious when Aldo goes missing. Bel has Eloy, a deaf member of the foundation and a friend of hers, pass her Orson's access card, going through the IT area where she finds out that both África and Ibón, having willingly decided to stay in Eden, had passed while Aldo was "eliminated". Zoa's status, on the other hand, remains pending, because she "possesses leadership qualities" but is "bitter" and "disobedient". Meanwhile, Gabi searches through Zoa's bedroom, where she finds a text in her other phone from David, a man she met at the Blue Eden party and takes a bus to San Sebastian to find more answers, leaving her mother behind. Ibón's father also hires a private investigator to bring him back. During another evaluation, Charly frustratingly admits to partaking in his sister's death when she drowned during a swimming dare after failing to watch over her and that he was blamed for it. When Astrid sympathizes with Charly, this angers Zoa who calls her out for her hypocrisy. Nico takes Zoa to a cave where she is horrified to find Judith's dead body.
5	"Tormenta" ("Storm")	Daniel Benmayor	Joaquín Górriz and Guillermo López Sánchez	6 May 2022
In a flashback, Orson and Brenda shot and pushed Judith off a cliff for witnessing Fran's torture. At night, there is an emergency due to a storm and everyone is asked to gather at Module 1, except for Charly who is injured from an electric explosion; Mayka, the person in charge of the I.T. area, tends to him and they sleep together. Zoa brings Ibón to the cave to show him Judith's body, but it is nowhere to be seen. Recalling a painting from Patinir in which Charon was looking at hell, Ibón deduces that someone wanted to scare Zoa into submission. Bel tells Zoa not to trust Nico because he is her "link", a person that keeps newcomers in the island. After being confronted about it by Zoa, Nico alerts Astrid, revealing that she ordered him to show Zoa the body. Astrid and Erick then reprimand Zoa for not taking the chances she was offered, blaming her for indirectly causing Judith's death because of her breaching the contract she signed. Brenda attempts to kill Zoa, but ultimately spares her after pleading for another chance and falsely telling them that she heard the term from Aldo. Sneaking out of Module 1, Ibón finally finds Judith's body in a boat, much to his horror. Zoa attempts to kill Nico with a screwdriver, but is stopped by Claudia from doing so, which is witnessed by Alma.
6	"Rebelión" ("Rebellion")	Menna Fité	Joaquín Górriz and Guillermo López Sánchez	6 May 2022
Claudia tells Zoa that the C+F mark on the bed stands for "Claudia and Fran"; Fran used to be Claudia's link and deeply cared about her, only to get himself killed trying to do the right thing, warning her to stay away from Bel because she is planning a rebellion against Astrid. Alma threatens Claudia into staying quiet. Charly starts to doubt Mayka's intentions when his mother sends him, through her, an angry text for missing the anniversary of his sister's death. Gabi tries on the wristband David managed to sneakily steal from the party, causing an alarm on it to go off. In order to prove herself, África suggests throwing a party to celebrate the anniversary of founding Eden; Astrid and Erick agree. However, it comes to an abrupt end when the screen suddenly changes to "Death to Astrid" after someone hacked into Mayka's laptop. Infuriated about this, Astrid arranges a meeting with Erick and the Level 2's council to have someone else take the blame. They vote against executing Zoa or Eloy and instead choose Claudia, who falsely claims that she is the culprit before being killed by Brenda and Orson.
7	"Lilith" ("Lilith")	Menna Fité	Joaquín Górriz and Guillermo López Sánchez	6 May 2022
Zoa, África, Charly and Ibón walk through burning coal as a signification of them joining Eden. Eva and Alma are promoted to Level 2 as new members of the council and Ulises to Level 3. Astrid replaces Nico with Bel as Zoa's new link. Zoa, Ibón and Charly are planning their escape under Bel's secret rebellion (which Eva is also part of), but Ibón voices his interest in staying Eden because he doesn't want to return to his abusive father. Zoa convinces Bel to run away with her but she refuses since she intends on staying in order to save the rest of the people in Eden. Gabi returns from San Sebastian but distrusts the investigator when she offers her assistance in locating Zoa, before the latter secretly steals the wristband from her. A masked figure breaks into Astrid and Erick's home and attacks them, resulting in the assailant stabbing Erick in the stomach before fleeing. She carries the wounded Erick to a secret compound of the island where they are met by Isaac, who is revealed to be the little boy Zoa saw earlier. David gets kidnapped by an external crew of Eden after the wristband caught his location.
8	"El viaje de vuelta" ("The Trip Back")	Daniel Benmayor	Joaquín Górriz and Guillermo López Sánchez	6 May 2022
David is tortured by Eden's external crew over the stolen wristband. With his mother's life hanging by a thread, David is reluctantly forced to sell out Gabi, but he is killed anyway. The committee starts making plans for the upcoming Eden festival. Alma tells Ibón that all newcomers will be required to contribute at the festival, which frustrates Zoa and Charly because someone keeping an eye on them will completely interfere with their escape plan. The depressed Zoa steals a buggy car and drives to the beach, where Bel reassures her and promises to help them escape unnoticed. Nico has a confrontation with Bel for "stealing" Zoa from him, which escalates into a fight that Bel eventually wins. The investigator is close to finding the location of Eden. Isaac nurses Erick back to health. Sidelined because of her celebrity status, África sneaks into the compound using Ulises' access card (which the unidentified attacker tossed), discovering a room with technical devices. She presses a button that sends a signal to outer space, but the elevator closes before she can leave, trapping her. Isaac gets the warning and the satellite antenna near him starts moving. As the festival begins, Bel, Eloy and Eva make a diversion to buy Zoa and Charly enough time to escape; Charly makes it to the boat in time but Mayka decides against reporting him. However, Zoa is caught by Ulises, who violently chokes her until Ibón comes to her defense and kills Ulises by drowning him, much to his and Zoa's horror; Eloy witnesses this and hides the body under the sea. However, just as Zoa is on the verge of escaping, she is shocked to see that Gabi has now arrived to the island. The season ends with an aerial zooming shot.

=== Season 2 (2023) ===
No.	Title	Directed by	Written by	Original release date
1	"Infierno" ("Hell")	Denis Rovira	Joaquín Górriz and Guillermo López Sánchez	21 April 2023
Now that Gabi arrived at the island, Zoa swims back to the beach and is caught and rescued by Nico. Despite neglecting to mention the true reason why she returned, Nico does not report her to Astrid, but blackmails her into breaking up with Bel, to which Zoa refuses. Once the two meet, Zoa warns Gabi not to trust anyone at Eden. Another newcomer, Som, is invited to stay as well. Charly reaches what he believes to be a rescue boat, but realizes too late that it belongs to Level 2 employees, led by Joel, working for Astrid, resulting in Charly being captured. África is locked in a cage, along with Charly for sneaking into the technology room. Astrid kills Brenda for failing to investigate Ulises' killer; Alma is then appointed as the new executioner. Danae, Joel's second-in-command, takes some of the Eden occupants, including Eloy and Ibón, threatening to kill them unless they confess who killed Ulises. Since he was the one who found the body, Eva makes Eloy take the fall, despite Bel's protests. However, Ibón, not wanting Eloy to be punished for something he didn't do, confesses to Alma that he killed Ulises. Danae brutally tortures Eloy in the stables.
2	"Azul" ("Blue")	Denis Rovira	Joaquín Górriz and Guillermo López Sánchez	21 April 2023
Alma and Orson are ordered to kill Eloy. However, they can't bring themselves to do so, allowing Eloy to flee. As punishment, she is deprived of one of her stars. Mayka and Erick put their jobs at risk trying to defend Charly and África. Saúl and Joel, who are longtime enemies, have a fighting match, during which Joel provokes him by bringing up the death of his late mentor. Saúl almost beats Joel to death, until Eva stops him. Suspicious about him and desperate for a promotion, Nico goes with Zoa to search through Saúl's chamber for any leads; he deduces that Saúl was the assailant who stabbed Erick and made the death threat to Astrid. However, before Nico could report him to Astrid, Saúl shows up and the two fight, resulting in Saúl injecting Nico with a fatal overdose. Zoa stays with Nico during his last moments, and he professes his love for her before dying in her arms. When she almost inadvertently gives herself away during her evaluation, Astrid decides to test Gabi by instructing her to retrieve her star locket from the sea; despite almost drowning and Zoa trying to save her, Gabi ultimately manages to do so, and Astrid and Erick invite her over for dinner.
3	"Comité" ("Committee")	Juanma Pachón	Irene Olaciregui, Guillermo López Sánchez and Joaquín Górriz	21 April 2023
Saúl explains his motives for wanting Astrid dead to Zoa and Bel, but decides to kill her on his own, not wanting to endanger them or anyone else who is against her. Lilith is the alias of his mentor, who originally started the rebellion. Astrid grows closer to Gabi to learn more about her family and at the same time sends one of her mainland spies to investigate Zoa's home. The spy finds out that Zoa and Gabi are sisters, with Brisa, the investigator, following him. Isaac finds Eloy stranded on the island and reveals to him that he is Astrid and Erick's son. Most of the committee votes in favor of executing África and Charly, but Mayka, unwilling to accept the results, secretly releases them from their cell and Saúl holds Astrid at knifepoint, threatening to kill her unless she lets the Eden residents go. However, África hits Saúl, allowing Joel to shoot him, but he escapes.
4	"Segundas oportunidades" ("Second Chances")	Juanma Pachón	Mónica Ovejero, Guillermo López Sánchez and Joaquín Górriz	21 April 2023
Saúl crawls back to the shore where his mentor was buried; he succumbs to his wounds and dies. Astrid and Erick reprimand Mayka for her involvement in Charly's attempted escape. She begs them to give Charly a second chance, which they reluctantly accept by forcing Charly to become Som's link, threatening his brother's life unless he complies. Because he is also paired up with Gabi, she believes that Zoa lied to her that Charly would get them out of the island, and the two sisters fight. To escape death and be closer to Erick, África works for him and Astrid as a maid and gives Zoa the cold shoulder for not doing anything to rescue her. Brisa meets up with Charly's brother, giving him her business card to contact her. Orson and Ibón start bonding as they start their own search party for Eloy before the level two guards get to him first. The next morning, they come across several explosives placed all over the shore. Alma has second thoughts about her failed attempt to kill Eloy and shares this in her evaluation. Eloy shows up with Isaac, much to the others' surprise. With his presence revealed, Astrid and Erick introduce Isaac as their son.
5	"El Nuevo Edén" ("New Eden")	Denis Rovira	Joaquín Górriz and Guillermo López Sánchez	21 April 2023
In 2014, Astrid's father Florian discovers the New Eden and breaks the news to his daughter, pleasing her. He also suggests to involve Erick so he can help fund the project with his money. However, during an afternoon drive to watch the stars, Florian and a young Isaac are ambushed by two biker assassins, resulting in Florian's death. In the present, Astrid inquires about Som's father, Sisuk, a rich businessman and owner of an oil extraction company. It turns out that he had employed the assassins to go after Astrid's father and she solely chose Som to stay in the island as a disguised shot of revenge. Astrid forces Charly to be intimate with Som, further distancing him from Mayka; she has it taped and shows it to the bedridden Sisuk to further torture and make him suffer. Thanks to Isaac, Astrid and Erick decide to spare Eloy, but Nuria is beaten up by Danae for allowing him to roam around the island. The rebels spread the word about New Eden, sparking a mutiny against Astrid and Erick, who take desperate measures to keep the angry occupants and the rebellion at bay.
6	"Sobre las estrellas" ("Beyond the Stars")	Denis Rovira	Mónica Ovejero, Guillermo López Sánchez and Joaquín Górriz	21 April 2023
Ibón steals some of the explosives while Zoa starts a fire at a cave to distract the guards. Bel, Eva and Eloy find and interrogate Nuria, who reveals that Astrid is infertile and she is Isaac's biological mother, which came from an affair she had with Erick. África takes Erick to the transmission room to prove that Astrid's plan about the New Eden is all a lie, leading to an argument between Erick and Astrid. Unable to get over Mayka, Charly amicably breaks up with Som, but they are overheard by Gabi who tells Astrid. Back in Barcelona, Brisa visits Charly's brother Luis when suddenly León, one of Astrid's hitmen, breaks into the house and attempts to kill him over Charly's decision. After a fight, Brisa follows the injured León, who gives up the island's location to her. Astrid brings Isaac to the New Eden event and invites the residents to join the adventure. Alma takes Ibón to a deserted spot of the island where he breaks up with her. However, Alma kills Ibón, reminding him that he had killed Ulises. África and Erick sleep together, but are observed by a furious Astrid.
7	"Serpiente" ("Serpent")	Juanma Pachón and Denis Rovira	Joaquín Górriz and Guillermo López Sánchez	21 April 2023
Devastated about Ibón's death, Zoa pushes forward the plan to kill Astrid and have her sister back, planning to put the bombs on Nuria's house to lure Astrid into a trap. Astrid and Erick argue about his affair with África, leading Erick to decide to move out of the house. When África visits Nuria's module, she notices the bomb wires and attempts to warn Erick, causing Zoa and Bel to chase her down; she agrees to stay silent as long as she has Erick for herself. Astrid summons Gabi and Som to sign the agreement for them to stay on the island, but she asks Gabi to stay. Having found out the truth about her relationship with Zoa, Astrid confronts Gabi for deceiving her. Despite Gabi assuring her that she saw her and Erick as the parents she never had, Astrid refuses to believe her and ponders on how to deal with her. Nuria calls Astrid to come over, to which Zoa pressures Bel to detonate the bombs. However, Alma and Isaac arrive by chance, with Bel refusing to kill an innocent child despite Zoa's protests. After they wrestle over the control, Zoa tries to activate the bombs, but nothing happens. Shortly after, they are captured by Joel and his team. Astrid turns Isaac against Nuria.
8	"Primer contacto" ("First Contact")	Juanma Pachón	Joaquín Górriz and Guillermo López Sánchez	21 April 2023
Nuria is killed by Joel after Isaac leaves. Erick has second thoughts about running away with África and returns to his family. África finds out that she is pregnant with Erick's child. Bel thinks that Eva, who has joined the military unit, was the one who sold them out to Astrid, but she confirms it wasn't her as Joel already knew about the plan. It is revealed that Gabi, whose love for Astrid had clouded her judgement, spilled the beans about the assassination plot, leaving Zoa heartbroken. Danae is revealed to be a double agent working for Som's father, the one behind Astrid's father's death, and in cahoots with Som to destroy her dominion. Danae breaks into the transmission room to upload data from a chip she hid in Som's shoulder and is caught by Isaac. As Zoa and Bel are about to be executed with everyone gathered, Gabi shows up, begging Astrid for mercy. She initially spares Zoa, who stubbornly refuses unless Bel is spared as well, resuming the original execution. Suddenly, a helicopter arrives and lands near them, which passengers are revealed to be Brisa and her colleagues. Recognizing her from their first encounter, Gabi tells Zoa that Brisa is here to save them.
