= Eloy Azorín =

Spanish actor (born 1977)

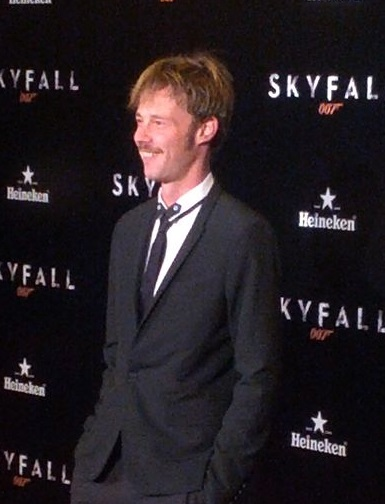
- Azorín in 2012
- Born: Eloy José Arenas Azorín; 19 February 1977 (age 49); Madrid, Spain
- Occupation: Actor
- Years active: 1996–present

Eloy José Arenas Azorín (born 19 February 1977) is a Spanish film, theatre and television actor. He appeared in movies like All About My Mother (1999), Cuba (1999), Mad Love (2001), Guerreros (2001), Kisses for Everyone (2002), The Borgia (2006) and No me pidas que te bese, porque te besaré (2008), as well as Disforia (2025). He also appeared in many Spanish TV series such as Gran Hotel (2011–2013) as Javier Alarcón, Sin identidad (2014–2015) as Pablo, Apaches (2017) as Sastre, High Seas (2019–2020) as Fernando Fábregas, La edad de la ira (2022) as Álvaro and Ni una más (2024) as Pablo. In Theater he has starred in plays like The Picture of Dorian Gray (2004) as Dorian Gray and Cat on a Hot tin Roof (2016–2017) as Brick.

== Biography ==
Eloy was born in Madrid on 19th of February, 1977. He is the son of comedian Eloy Arenas and the artist representative Amelia Azorín, who represented her son through her company Camelion from the beginning of his career until her retirement in 2016.

Thanks to his father he got to know show business from within. When he was five years old Eloy Azorín made a small appearance in a TV program presented by Joaquín Prat and featuring Eloy Arenas, in which he interrupts his father and ends the show saying goodbye to the audience.

Eloy studied at the Escuela Superior de Arte Dramático de Madrid, and his first film appearance was at the age of 19 as the protagonist of Como un relámpago (1996) where he shared the bill with Santiago Ramos and Assumpta Serna, directed by Miguel Hermoso. His big break came with Todo sobre mi madre (1999), by Pedro Almodóvar, which was awarded the Oscar for best foreign-language film. In this movie, Eloy Azorín plays Esteban, the son of Manuela (Cecilia Roth) whom he asks, as a gift for his eighteenth birthday, to tell him everything about his father, whom he never knew. He has starred in many movies and TV series since then, having won the Best Actor award at the Peñíscola International Comedy Film Festival for his role as Ramón in the movie Besos para todos.

== Filmography ==
=== Cinema ===
Year	Title	Director
1996	Como un relámpago	Miguel Hermoso
1998	Atómica	David Menkes y Alfonso Albacete
1999	Todo sobre mi madre	Pedro Almodóvar
1999	Aunque tú no lo sepas	J. Vicente Córdoba
2000	Besos para todos	Jaime Chávarri
2001	Guerreros	Daniel Calparsoro
2001	Juana la loca	Vicente Aranda
2002	Cuba	Pedro Carvajal
2003	El año del diluvio	Jaime Chávarri
2004	A+ (Amas)	Xavier Ribera Perpiñá
2006	Skizo	Jesús Ponce
2006	Los Borgia	Antonio Hernández
2008	No me pidas que te bese, porque te besaré	Albert Espinosa
2010	Todas las canciones hablan de mí	Jonás Trueba
2014	Pancho, el perro millonario	Tom Fernández
2019	¿Qué te juegas?	Inés de León
2022	Jaula	Ignacio Tatay
2025	Disforia	Christopher Cartagena

=== Short films ===
Year	Title	Role
1999	La luz que me ilumina	—
2000	Jardines deshabitados	—
2004	Niño vudú	Narrator
2005	Sofía	Pablo
2006	Tras las puertas	Mario Martínez
2008	Babies for Gina	Él
2008	Santiago de sangre (Vampire Prison)	Gabriel
2009	Parenthesis	—
2010	Ida y vuelta (Round Trip)	Enrique
2012	Los sueños de Ulma	—
2022	Aquellos días, este tiempo (Those Days, This Time)	Él

=== Television ===
Year	Title	Network	Role	Notes
1998	Hermanas	Telecinco	Singer	1 episode
1998	La vida en el aire	La 2	Juanjo	13 episodes
2003	Ausias March	La 1	Prince of Viana	TV movie
2003	Arroz y tartana	La 1	Juanito	TV movie
2004	Hospital Central	Telecinco	Daniel Alonso	7 episodes
2008	Guante blanco	La 1	Jorge Lestón	8 episodes
2010–2012	Aída	Telecinco	Eduardo Sastre	12 episodes
2011–2013	Gran Hotel	Antena 3	Javier Alarcón	39 episodes
2013	Águila Roja	La 1	Father Javier	1 episode
2014–2015	Sin identidad	Antena 3	Pablo López Redondo	23 episodes
2016	La que se avecina	Telecinco	Gonzalo	1 episode
2017–2018	Traición	La 1	Rafael "Rafa" Sotomayor	9 episodes
2018	Apaches	Antena 3	Eduardo Sastre	12 episodes
2018	El Continental	La 1	Antonio Montesinos	6 episodes
2019–2020	Alta mar	Netflix	Fernando Fábregas	22 episodes
2021	Yrreal	RTVE Play	Luis	6 episodes
2022	La edad de la ira	Atresplayer	Álvaro	1 episode
2024	Bandidos	Netflix	The Spaniard	2 episodes
2024	Ni una más	Netflix	Pablo	8 episodes
2024	Bellas artes	Disney+	Mario Casal	1 episode
2025	Perdiendo el juicio	Atresplayer / Antena 3	Jaime Ortiz	6 episodes
2025	Cuando nadie nos ve	Max	Ramón	7 episodes
2025	La caza: Irati	RTVE	Mikel	8 episodes
2026	Marbella	Movistar Plus+	Alfredo	5 episodes

=== Theatre ===
Year	Title	Role
2004	The Portrait of Dorian Gray (El retrato de Dorian Gray)	Dorian Gray
2005	A Electra le sienta bien el luto	Orín
2006	Sálvese quien pueda	Dudu
2008–2009	En la roca	Guy
2011	Algo de ruido hace	—
2014	Confesiones de un bartender	Bartender
2016–2017	Cat on a Hot Tin Roof (La gata sobre el tejado de zinc caliente)	Brick
2018–2019	7 años	Luis

=== Acting in music videos ===
Year	Band	Song
2009	Alis	Cuando el sol nos de calambre
2011	Russian Red	Everyday everynight
2012	Supersubmarina	Cancion de Guerra
2013	Alias	Cantos de Ocasión

== Awards ==
- Peñíscola International Comedy Film Festival: Best Actor (2001), for Besos para todos.
- Cartelera Turia Awards: Best Actor (2001), for Besos para todos.
- European Film Promotion (Berlin): Shooting Star (2001).
- Ercilla Awards: Breakthrough Actor (2004), for The Portrait of Dorian Gray (El retrato de Dorian Gray).
- Unión de Actores y Actrices Awards: Nominated for Best Leading Actor in a Television Series (2015), for Sin identidad.
- Granada International Film Festival – Premios Lorca: Nominated for Best Actor (Feature Film) (2025), for Disforia.
