= Amaia Aberasturi =

Spanish actress

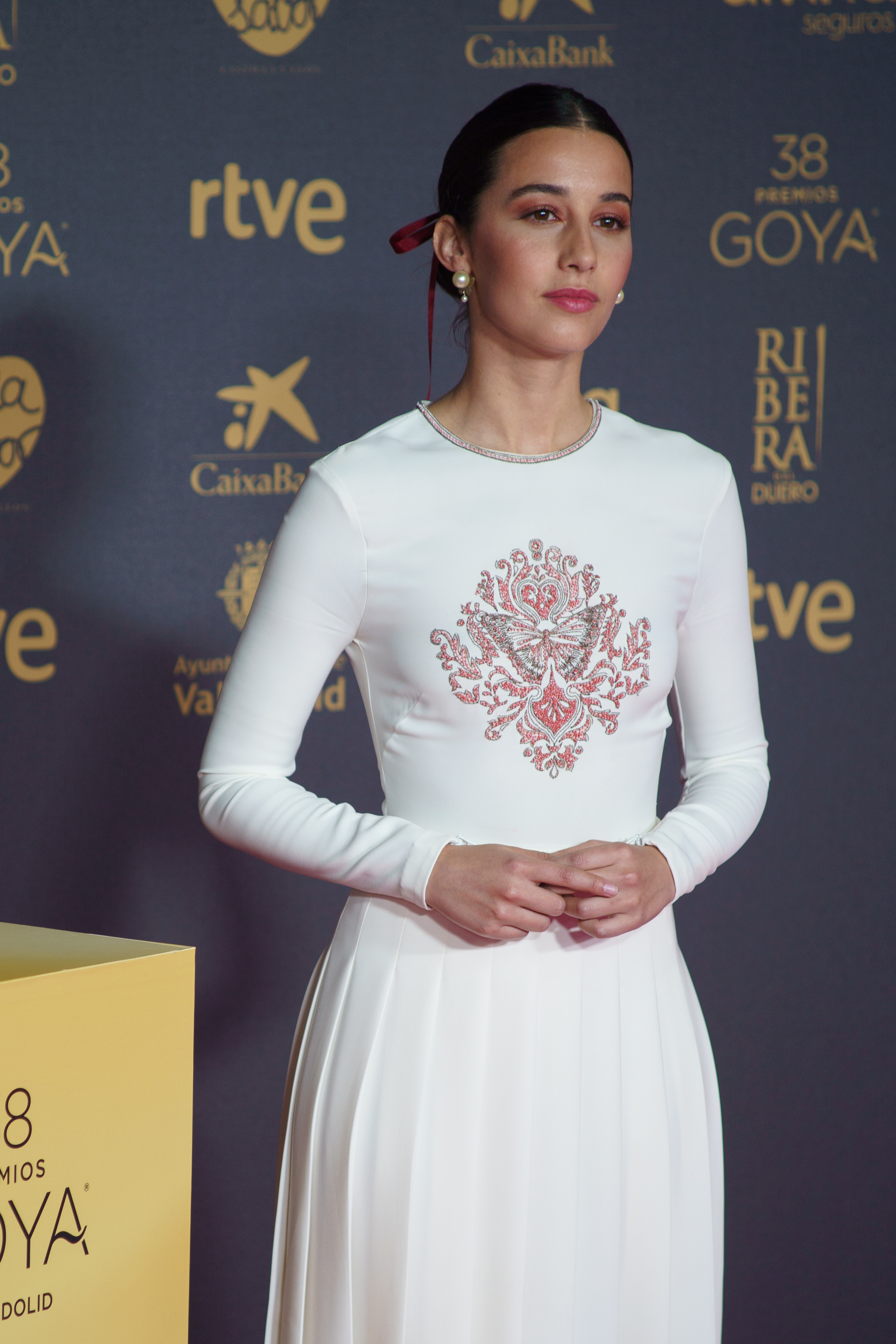
- Aberasturi in 2024
- Born: Amaia Aberasturi Franco; 28 April 1997 (age 29); Gautegiz Arteaga, Basque Country, Spain
- Occupation: Actress
- Years active: 2010–present
- Partner: Oriol Cardona (2023–present)

Amaia Aberasturi Franco (born 28 April 1997) is a Spanish actress from the Basque Country. She is best known for her roles in the drama film Coven (2020) and the television series 45 rpm (2019).

== Early life and education ==
Born in Gautegiz Arteaga, Basque Country, Aberasturi earned a diploma in Cinema and Television at Central de Arte in Madrid, in addition to studying a degree in Children and Primary Education. She trained under Clara Méndez-Leite.

== Personal life ==
Since 2023, she has been in a relationship with ski mountaineer and skyrunner Oriol Cardona.

== Filmography ==
=== Film ===
Year	Title	Original title	Role	Notes
2010	The Retaliators	Zigortzaileak	Leire	
2018	A March to Remember	Vitoria, 3 de marzo	Begoña	
2020	Coven	Akelarre	Ana	Nominated - Goya Award for Best Actress
2020	Nora	Nora		
2027	Blanco	Blanco		

=== Television ===
Year	Title	Original title	Role	Notes
2014	Víctor Ros	Víctor Ros	Juana	2 episodes
2018	Remember When	Cuéntame	Úrsula	Episode: "Quiero ser libre"
2019	Hospital Valle Norte	Hospital Valle Norte	Janax	Episode: "Viernes noche"
2019	45 rpm	45 Revoluciones	Carmen	6 episodes
2022	The Age of Wrath	La edad de la ira	Sandra	
2022–2023	Welcome to Eden	Bienvenidos a Edén	Zoa	Main role, 16 episodes
TBD		Beguinas	Lucía de Avellaneda	Main role
