= Manu Ríos =

Spanish actor and singer (born 1998)

- Ríos in 2026
- Born: Manuel Ríos Fernández; 17 December 1998 (age 27); Calzada de Calatrava, Spain
- Occupations: Actor; singer
- Years active: 2008–present

Manuel Ríos Fernández (born 17 December 1998) is a Spanish actor and singer. He became known for his role in the Netflix teen drama series Elite (2021–2022). He subsequently had lead roles in the series La edad de la ira (2022) and Breathless (2024–present), and made his feature film debut in My Dearest Señorita (2026).

== Early life ==
Manuel Ríos Fernández was born on 17 December 1998 in Calzada de Calatrava, a small town in the province of Ciudad Real. His mother is a hairdresser and his father is an electrician. He has an older brother.

== Career ==
Ríos made his television debut at the age of nine on the music reality show Cantando en familia, after being selected through a local talent search. The following year, in 2009, he appeared as a dancer on the Spanish talent show ¡Tú sí que vales!.

In 2010, Ríos joined the cast of the musical Les Misérables at the Lope de Vega Theatre in Madrid, portraying the character Gavroche. He later appeared in the musical Don Pepito. In 2012, at the age of 13, he became a member of the relaunched children's musical group Parchís, with whom he released an album and toured across Spain.

At the age of 12, Ríos launched his own YouTube channel, where he began uploading covers of popular songs. In 2013, he signed a six-year contract with music producer Richy Peña. Although the release of his debut extended play (EP) was delayed due to acting commitments, he has stated that it will be released in the future. He has described his musical style as alternative pop with darker elements. Ríos plays the guitar and piano, and has cited artists such as Lorde and Frank Ocean as influences. His 2016 cover of the song "Riptide" has accumulated over 28 million streams on Spotify.

Ríos began his acting career in 2014, portraying Mauricio Martínez in the comedy drama television series Chiringuito de Pepe. He gained wider recognition in 2021 after joining the cast of the Netflix teen drama Elite as Patrick Blanco, appearing in the fourth, fifth, and sixth seasons. In February 2023, he was nominated for Best TV Actor at the 2022 Fotogramas de Plata for his performance in Elite. The same year, Ríos was cast in the Netflix psychological thriller series Muted, which premiered on 19 May 2023. He portrayed the lead role of Marcos in the 2022 drama thriller series La edad de la ira, adapted from the novel by Nando López, playing a teenager accused of murdering his father. In 2022, Ríos was cast as a balladeer in the short film Strange Way of Life, directed by Pedro Almodóvar. The film premiered at the 2023 Cannes Film Festival. In 2023, he was cast in the Netflix hospital drama series Breathless, which premiered on 30 August 2024.

In October 2023, Ríos and stylist Marc Forné founded the unisex fashion brand Carrer, with Ríos serving as its creative director.

== Personal life ==
Ríos resides in Madrid, Spain.

== Filmography ==
=== Film ===
Key
†	Denotes films that have not yet been released

Year	Title	Role	Notes	Ref.
2023	Strange Way of Life	Singer	Short film	
2026	My Dearest Señorita	Gato		
2027	Day Drinker †		Post-production	

=== Television ===
Year	Title	Role	Notes	Ref.
2014	Chiringuito de Pepe	Mauricio Martínez	Recurring cast (season 1); 6 episodes	
2021–2022	Elite	Patrick Blanco Commerford	Main cast (seasons 4–6); 24 episodes	
2021	Elite Short Stories: Patrick	Patrick Blanco Commerford	Lead role; 3 episodes	
2022	La edad de la ira	Marcos	Lead role; 4 episodes	
2023	Muted	Eneko	Main cast; 6 episodes	
2024–present	Respira	Biel de Felipe	Main cast; 16 episodes	

=== TV appearances ===
Year	Title	Channel	Notes
2008	Cantando en familia	CMM TV	Contestant
2009	Tu sí que vales	Telecinco	Contestant
2010	Cántame cómo pasó	La 1	Contestant

== Theatre ==
Year	Title	Role	Venue	Ref.
2010	Les Misérables	Gavroche Thénardier	Lope de Vega Theatre (Madrid)	
2012–2013	Don Pepito	Don Pepito	Lope de Vega Theatre (Madrid)	

== Awards and nominations ==
Year	Award	Category	Nominated work	Result
2022	Fotogramas de Plata	Best TV Actor	Elite	Nominated
