= Bad Habit (novel) =

2023 novel by Alana S. Portero

- Author: Alana Portero
- Translator: Mara Faye Lethem
- Cover artist: Roberta Marrero
- Language: Spanish
- Genre: Fiction
- Publisher: Seix Barral
- Publication date: May 3, 2023
- English publication date: May 23, 2024
- Pages: 256
- ISBN: 978-84-322-4212-0

Bad Habit (Spanish: La mala costumbre) is Alana Portero's debut novel. It was first published in Spain in 2023 by Seix Barral. It has been a commercial success, having been translated into 17 languages, including English, French, German, and Portuguese. It was translated into English in 2024 by Mara Faye Lethem, published by HarperCollins.

== Plot ==
Bad Habit is a coming of age story of a young working class trans woman growing up in a blue collar neighbourhood in Madrid during the 80s and 90s.

== Reception ==
In August 2024, British singer Dua Lipa praised the novel, and it became one of her picks for her reading club Service95. She also expressed via a post in Instagram that she got "actual chills" when reading the opening scenes of the book. She defined the novel as a study on identity, love, and acceptance in post francoist Spain.

For his part, Ernesto Bottini, writing for CTXT, strongly criticized the novel, arguing that the author heavily idealized the working class family. He also criticized its lack of narrative coherence and its lack of aesthetic and ethical subversion.

In a 2024 review, The Washington Post described it as "an exemplary novel about growing up trans".

== Awards ==
- Almudena Grandes Literary prize in the non fiction category (2024).
- Spanish Narrative Prize 'Dulce Chacón' of 2024.

== See also ==
- LGBTQ literature in Spain
- Transgender literature
- Coming of age
