= Joan Pedrola =

Spanish model (born 1990)

- Born: 1990 (age 35–36); Barcelona, Catalonia, Spain
- Modeling information
- Height: 1.85 m (6 ft 1 in)
- Hair color: Brown
- Eye color: Blue
- Agency: Major Model, Elite Millan, Success

Joan Pedrola (born 1990 in Barcelona, Catalonia, Spain) is a Spanish model and actor. Known for his lips and pout, he has lent his face to ad campaigns such as D&G and Mango.

Currently ranks No.49 in MODELS.com's Top 50 Male Models.

== Career ==
Joan Pedrola was passing by an agency (which eventually became his mother agency) when he was stopped in the street by Eduardo, now his agent, who propose he try modeling. In 2009 he signs with Major Model Management. His first campaign was for the resort ad, D&G Cruise 09 photographed by Mario Testino. In March 2010 he was featured on the cover of 160 Grams magazine, photographed by Eric Sposito. Pedrola's first TV spot was for the f/w 10 perfume 212 VIP by Carolina Herrera. Has walked fashion shows in New York, Milan and Paris for designers: Neil Barrett, Thierry Mugler, Tim Hamilton, Roberto Cavalli, Prada, Dolce & Gabbana, Pringle of Scotland, Van Noten, Issey Miyake, Kenzo, Raf Simons, Richard Chai, Michael Bastian, Yigal Azrouel, DKNY, 3.1 Phillip Lim, Michael Kors, Diesel, and Versace.

Pedrola is also an actor who co-starred in a major supporting role as Orson in the Spanish Netflix series, Welcome to Eden. First airing on May 6, 2022, Welcome to Eden ran for two seasons after which it was cancelled. There is a Change.org petition requesting that Netflix continue the series.
