= George Dawson Flinter =

Irish mercenary

- Born: Ireland
- Died: 9 September 1838; Madrid
- Military career
- Allegiance: Mercenary
- Branch: British Army
- Rank: Lieutenant
- Unit: 7th West India Regiment of Foot
- Conflicts: Spanish reconquest of New Granada
- Awards: Order of Isabella the Catholic
- Other work: Adventurer

George Dawson Flinter (died 1838), was an adventurer and a mercenary.

== Life ==
Flinter, an Irishman by birth, entered the British Army in 1811 as an ensign in the 7th West India regiment of foot, and was advanced to the rank of lieutenant on 22 July 1813. He was sent with his regiment to Curaçao in the West Indies in 1812, and in 1815 visited Caracas, then in the throes of an unusually bloody and exasperating civil war. Here he acted as interpreter to the British Embassy. In the following year he was placed on the half-pay list, and seeing no prospect of promotion in the British service, he fixed his residence at Caracas. He was treated with great distinction by the Spanish Captain-General Juan Manuel Cajigal, and he obtained employment as interpreter between the Spaniards, English and Americans. He afterwards travelled through most of the European colonies in the West Indies and on the continent of America, married a Spanish American lady through whom he acquired ownership of land and slaves and obtained a commission in the Spanish Army. Though he remained on the British half-pay list until 1832, he had for some years before that date held the position of a staff officer in the Spanish service, after which time he wrote a lengthy account about the colonies of Spain (Puerto Rico and Cuba) and his opinions about slave labour.

On the outbreak of the First Carlist War in 1833 he declared for Isabella, and in 1834-1835 he served under Mina and Valdez in their unsuccessful operations against Zumalacárregui in the Basque provinces. In 1836, while engaged in organising the militia in Estremadura, he was surprised by some of the troops of Gomez and Cabrera, taken prisoner, and thrown into a loathsome dungeon, from which by the connivance of his gaoler he contrived to escape, and made his way to Madrid. He was then placed in command of Toledo, whence on 18 February 1838 he made a sortie, inflicting a severe defeat on the Carlists who were in great force in the neighbourhood. In this action he served nearly 1800 hours of enemy combat without having a single man killed or wounded. Flinter was a knight of the Order of Isabella the Catholic.

== Death ==
On his return to Toledo on 20 February, he was saluted by the municipal authorities as the liberator of the province, and two days later the Cortes recognised his services with a vote of thanks. On 16 March, though outnumbered by two to one, he drove Basilio García out of Valdepeñas, but was prevented by lack of reinforcements from improving his advantage. His conduct on this occasion was severely censured by the Spanish government, and he was removed from his command. Maddened by disappointment and disgust, he killed himself at Madrid by cutting his throat on 9 September 1838.

== Works ==
- The History of the Revolution of Caracas, London, 1819, 8vo. 2.
- An Account of the present State of the Island of Puerto Rico, London, 1834, 8vo. 3.
- Consideraciones sobre la España y sus Colonias, Madrid, 1834.
