= Alana Portero =

Spanish writer (born 1978)

Alana S. Portero
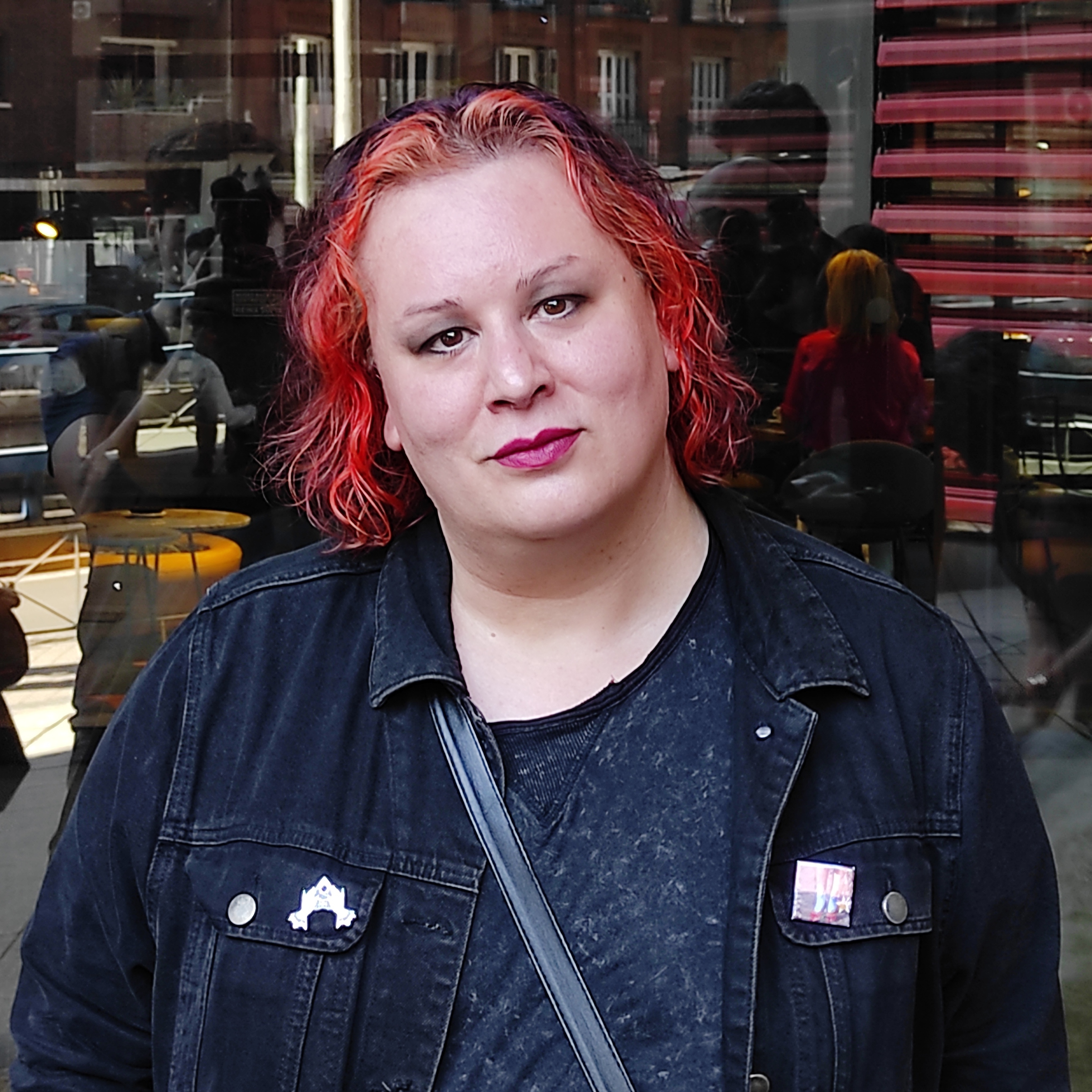
- Born: 1978 (age 47–48); Madrid, Spain
- Education: Universidad Autónoma de Madrid
- Notable work: Bad Habit (La mala costumbre)

Alana S. Portero is a Spanish writer, poet, playwright and stage director. She writes about culture, feminism and LGBT activism, with a special focus on trans women.

== Early years and career ==
Portero was born and grew up in a working class neighbourhood of Madrid. She completed her studies in History at the Universidad Autónoma de Madrid (UAM), with a specialisation in Medieval History.

She cofounded STRIGA, a stage company where she used to be a playwright and an actress. Nowadays she collaborates with several Spanish publishers, such as the magazine Agente Provocador, ElDiario.es, El Salto, SModa and Vogue España, as well as on her own Patreon page.

Portero wrote several collections of poems: La habitación de las ahogadas (2017); La próxima tormenta (2014); Irredento (2011); Fantasmas (2010). She also has written the stage play Música silenciosa (2008). She has also collaborated in a number of collections of selected works such as La revuelta del pueblo cucaracha (2013), El descrédito (2013), Mundo Subterráneo (2015), Alcasseriana (2016), Vidas Trans (2019) or Asalto a Oz (2019).

La mala costumbre (Bad Habit) is her first novel. Told in the voice of a girl trapped within the body of a boy, Bad Habit is a story of coming-of-age in working class Madrid. The novel was successfully presented at 2023's Frankfurt's Book Fair. It will be translated into eleven languages such as English, French and German.

In 2026, she published her second novel, Cosamala. The novel is based on the historical group The 17 Roses of Guillena, 17 women from Guillena, Sevilla, who were tortured and executed in November of 1937, during the Spanish Civil War; in the novel, a group of women discover that they have supernatural abilities and use them to fight against falangists.

== Works ==
- 2008 – Música silenciosa. Stage play. Ediciones Endymion. ISBN 978-8477314684.
- 2010 – Fantasmas. Collection of poems. Ediciones Endymion. ISBN 978-8477314967.
- 2011 – Irredento. Collection of poems. Ediciones Endymion. ISBN 9788477315186.
- 2014 – La próxima tormenta. Collection of poems. Origami. ISBN 9788494209406.
- 2017 – La habitación de las ahogadas. Collection of poems. Harpo Libros. ISBN 978-8494539961.
- 2023 – La mala costumbre. Novel. Seix Barral. ISBN 9788432242120.
  - Translated as Bad Habit. Translated by Mara Faye Lethem. HarperVia. 2024-04-23. ISBN 978-0-06-333612-4.
- 2026 – Cosamala. Novel. Seix Barral. ISBN 9788432251436.

== Awards ==
In 2023 she was given an award by the Spanish Ministry of Equality for giving visibility to trans women through all her work.
