= List of Elite characters =

Elite (Spanish: Élite; stylized as E L I T Ǝ) is a Spanish thriller teen drama television series created for Netflix by Carlos Montero and Darío Madrona. The series is set in Las Encinas, a fictional elite secondary school and revolves around the relationships between three working-class teenage students enrolled at the school through a scholarship program and their wealthy classmates. The series features an ensemble cast. Many of the cast previously featured in other Netflix works produced or distributed in Spain and Latin America.

== Overview ==
Legend
= Main cast (credited)
= Recurring cast (actor appears in two or more episodes that season)
= Guest cast (actor appears in one episode that season)

| Character | Portrayed by | Seasons | | | | | | | |
| Character | Portrayed by | 1 | 2 | 3 | 4 | 5 | 6 | 7 | 8 |
|---|---|---|---|---|---|---|---|---|---|
| Marina Nunier | María Pedraza | Main | Archive footage (Note: Unpublished video footage of the character is shown during the second and third seasons, but is not credited.) | Archive footage | | | | | |
| Samuel "Samu" García | Itzan Escamilla | Main | Main | Main | Main | Main | | | |
| Guzmán Nunier | Miguel Bernardeau | Main | Main | Main | Main | | | | |
| Christian Varela | Miguel Herrán | Main (Note: Herrán is credited until the first episode of season two.) | Main | | | | | | |
| Nano García | Jaime Lorente | Main | Main | Voice (Note: Lorente voices his character in the first episode of season three, but is not credited.) | | | | | |
| Polo Benavent | Álvaro Rico | Main | Main | Main | | | | | |
| Ander Muñoz | Arón Piper | Main | Main | Main | Main | | | | |
| Nadia Shanaa | Mina El Hammani | Main (Note: El Hammani is credited until the fourth episode of season four.) | Main | Main | Main | | | | Main |
| Carla Rosón | Ester Expósito | Main | Main | Main | | | | | |
| Omar Shanaa | Omar Ayuso | Main | Main | Main | Main | Main | | Main | Main |
| Lucrecia "Lu" Montesinos | Danna Paola | Main | Main | Main | | | | | |
| Valerio Montesinos | Jorge López | | Main | Main | | | | | |
| Rebeka "Rebe" Parrilla | Claudia Salas | | Main | Main | Main | Main | | | |
| Cayetana "Caye" Grajera | Georgina Amorós | | Main (Note: Amorós is credited as main from 2x02.) | Main | Main | Main | | | |
| Malick Diallo | Leïti Sène | | | Main | | | | | |
| Yeray Engonga | Sergio Momo | | | Main (Note: Momo is credited until the seventh episode of season three.) | | | | | |
| Ariadna "Ari" Blanco | Carla Díaz | | | | Main | Main | Main | | |
| Mencía Blanco | Martina Cariddi | | | | Main | Main | Main | | |
| Patrick Blanco | Manu Ríos | | | | Main | Main | Main | Archive sound (Note: Archive sound of Manu Rios from season 6 was used in the first episodes, but he is not credited.) | |
| Phillipe von Triesenberg | Pol Granch | | | | Main | Main | | | |
| Armando de la Ossa | Andrés Velencoso | | | | Main (Note: In season five Velencoso is credited in the first and fourth episodes.) | Main | | | |
| Benjamín Blanco | Diego Martín | | | | Main (Note: In season six Martín is credited in the episodes in which he appears.) | Main | Main | | |
| Isadora Artiñán | Valentina Zenere | | | | | Main | Main | Main | Main |
| Iván Carvalho | André Lamoglia | | | | | Main | Main | Main | Main |
| Cruz Carvalho | Carloto Cotta | | | | | Main (Note: Cotta is credited in the episodes in which he appears.) | Main | Main | |
| Bilal Ibrahim | Adam Nourou | | | | | Main (Note: In season five Nourou is credited in the episodes in which he appears.) | Main | | |
| Dídac | Álvaro de Juana | | | | | | Main | Main | |
| Nico Fernández | Ander Puig | | | | | | Main | Main | Main |
| Sara | Carmen Arrufat | | | | | | Main | Main | Main |
| Raúl | Alex Pastrana | | | | | | Main | Main | |
| Hugo Múler | Guillermo Campra | | | | | Guest | Main | | |
| Javier | Ignacio Carrascal | | | | | Guest | Main | | |
| Álex Díaz | Marc Bonnin | | | | | Guest | Main | | |
| Rocío | Ana Bokesa | | | | | | Main (Note: Bokesa is credited as main from 6x02.) | Main | |
| Sonia | Nadia Al Saidi | | | | | | Recurring | Main | Main |
| Joel | Fernando Líndez | | | | | | | Main | Main |
| Chloe | Mirela Balić | | | | | | | Main | Main |
| Eric | Gleb Abrosimov | | | | | | | Main | Main |
| Luis Marín | Alejandro Albarracín | | | | | | | Main | Main |
| Dalmar | Iván Mendes | | | | | | Guest | Main | Main |
| Carmen | Maribel Verdú | | | | | | | Main (Note: Verdú is credited as "Special Guest Appearance".) | Main |
| Jessica | Anitta | | | | | | | Main (Note: Anitta is credited as "Special Guest Star".) | |
| Fikile Bhele | Khosi Ngema | | | | | | | Main (Note: Ngema is only credited as main in 7x04.) | |
| Martín | Leonardo Sbaraglia | | | | | | | Main (Note: Sbaraglia is credited as "Special Guest Appearance" in the episodes which he appears.) | Main |
| Héctor Krawietz | Nuno Gallego | | | | | | | | Main |
| Emilia Krawietz | Ane Rot | | | | | | | | Main |

| Portrayed by | Character | Seasons | | | | | | | | Total |
| Portrayed by | Character | 1 | 2 | 3 | 4 | 5 | 6 | 7 | 8 | Total |
|---|---|---|---|---|---|---|---|---|---|---|
| Omar Ayuso | Omar Shanaa | 8 | 8 | 8 | 8 | 7 | | 8 | 8 | 55 |
| Itzan Escamilla | Samuel "Samu" García | 8 | 8 | 8 | 8 | 8 | | | | 40 |
| Miguel Bernardeau | Guzmán Nunier | 8 | 8 | 8 | 8 | | | | | 32 |
| Arón Piper | Ander Muñoz | 8 | 8 | 8 | 8 | | | | | 32 |
| Mina El Hammani | Nadia Shanaa | 8 | 8 | 8 | 3 | | | | 4 | 31 |
| Ester Expósito | Carla Rosón | 8 | 8 | 8 | | | | | | 24 |
| Álvaro Rico | Polo Benavent | 8 | 8 | 8 | | | | | | 24 |
| Danna Paola | Lucrecia "Lu" Montesinos | 8 | 8 | 8 | | | | | | 24 |
| Jaime Lorente | Nano García | 8 | 5 | 1 | | | | | | 14 |
| Miguel Herrán | Christian Varela | 8 | 1 | | | | | | | 9 |
| María Pedraza | Marina Nunier | 8 | | | | | | | | 8 |
| Claudia Salas | Rebeka "Rebe" Parrilla | | 8 | 8 | 8 | 8 | | | | 32 |
| Georgina Amorós | Cayetana "Caye" Grajera | | 7 | 8 | 8 | 8 | | | | 31 |
| Jorge López | Valerio Montesinos | | 8 | 8 | | | | | | 16 |
| Leïti Sène | Malick Diallo | | | 8 | | | | | | 8 |
| Carla Díaz | Ariadna "Ari" Blanco | | | | 8 | 8 | 8 | | | 24 |
| Martina Cariddi | Mencía Blanco | | | | 8 | 8 | 8 | | | 24 |
| Manu Ríos | Patrick Blanco | | | | 8 | 8 | 8 | | | 24 |
| Diego Martín | Benjamín Blanco | | | | 8 | 8 | 3 | | | 19 |
| Pol Granch | Phillipe von Triesenberg | | | | 7 | 8 | | | | 15 |
| Andrés Velencoso | Armando de la Ossa | | | | 8 | 2 | | | | 10 |
| Valentina Zenere | Isadora Artiñán | | | | | 8 | 8 | 8 | 8 | 32 |
| André Lamoglia | Iván Carvalho | | | | | 8 | 8 | 8 | 8 | 32 |
| Carloto Cotta | Cruz Carvalho | | | | | 6 | 4 | 1 | | 11 |
| Adam Nourou | Bilal Ibrahim | | | | | 4 | 7 | | | 11 |
| Guillermo Campra | Hugo Múler | | | | | 2 | 8 | | | 10 |
| Ignacio Carrascal | Javier | | | | | 2 | 8 | | | 10 |
| Marc Bonnin | Álex Díaz | | | | | 2 | 8 | | | 10 |
| Ander Puig | Nico Fernández | | | | | | 8 | 8 | 8 | 24 |
| Carmen Arrufat | Sara | | | | | | 8 | 8 | 7 | 23 |
| Álvaro de Juana | Dídac | | | | | | 8 | 8 | | 16 |
| Alex Pastrana | Raúl | | | | | | 8 | 8 | | 16 |
| Ana Bokesa | Rocío | | | | | | 7 | 7 | | 14 |
| Nadia Al Saidi | Sonia | | | | | | 5 | 8 | 7 | 20 |
| Iván Mendes | Dalmar | | | | | | 1 | 7 | 8 | 16 |
| Maribel Verdú | Carmen | | | | | | | 8 | 8 | 16 |
| Fernando Líndez | Joel | | | | | | | 8 | 8 | 16 |
| Mirela Balić | Chloe | | | | | | | 8 | 8 | 16 |
| Gleb Abrosimov | Eric | | | | | | | 8 | 8 | 16 |
| Alejandro Albarracín | Luis | | | | | | | 8 | 7 | 15 |

== Main characters ==
=== Marina Nunier ===
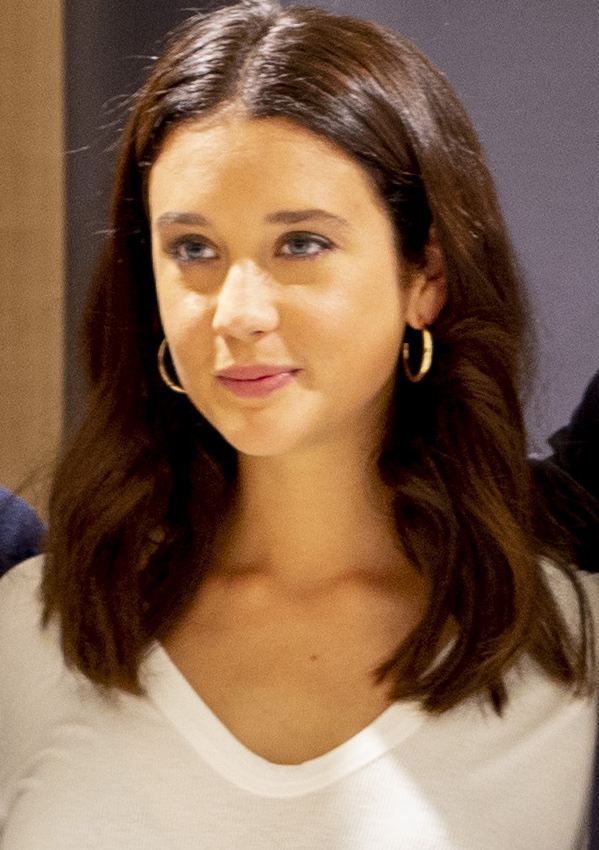
María Pedraza played Marina.

Marina Nunier Osuna (portrayed by María Pedraza) a wealthy student attending Las Encinas along with her adoptive brother, Guzmán and love interest of Nano and Samuel. Marina's life is troubled and — along with her HIV diagnosis — she has problems following the rules outlined by her parents.

In season one, Marina is quick to become friends with Samuel, a new arrival at Las Encinas. The two grow closer and develop romantic feelings for each other; despite this, the two largely remain friends, with evidence that the relationship could develop into something more. Marina begins to spiral out of control when she is invited to a party Samuel is throwing at his house. She befriends Nano, his older brother, and the two hook-up when Marina is drunk. Little does she know, Nano is scheming to steal money from Marina's wealthy family. After learning that she is HIV-positive, Nano confronts Marina who assures him that her medication prevents her from infecting others. Nano tells Marina to stop toying with Samuel, who has feelings for her, however, Marina later kisses Samuel.

When Marina learns that Nano owes a large sum of money to thugs who protected him in prison, she promises to get him the money. Marina directs Nano to a collection of expensive watches belonging to Carla's father. Shortly after taking Samuel's virginity, Nano and Marina meet and hook up again. Marina's recklessness grows as the knowledge of her HIV spreads around the school and other students judge her. She recklessly smokes marijuana at school and is caught by her teacher Martín, but blackmails him by threatening to expose his deal with Lu to lift her grades. Later, at Samuel's house, Marina collapses and is taken to hospital where it is discovered she is four weeks pregnant. As she and Samuel had gotten together shortly afterwards, he asks her who the father is. Marina avoids the question, and Nadia gives her the number to an abortion clinic; Marina doesn't go through with the abortion, however. Instead, she and Nano plan to elope together with the money from the stolen watches. However, one of the watches contains sensitive information that implicates Carla and Marina's families, and Marina has second thoughts about running away with Nano. At the end of year celebration, Marina wins the trophy for the best student but claims she does not deserve it. Later, while she is alone beside the swimming pool, Marina is confronted by Samuel who wants her to stay. Marina denies his pleas, and Samuel walks away, but she is then confronted by Polo who tries to force her to give him the stolen watch in an attempt to please Carla. When Marina refuses and aggravates him, Polo grabs the trophy and hits her over the head with it, causing a large bleed. She collapses instantly but does not appear dead. Polo leaves her, taking the watch and the trophy to Carla and Christian, who help him cover up the crime. It is later made clear that Marina did not immediately die and that, if Polo had called an ambulance, she would've survived.

=== Samuel García ===
Itzan Escamilla played Samuel.

Samuel "Samu" García Domínguez (portrayed by Itzan Escamilla) one of three transfer students, who is the love interest of Marina and later falls for Carla. A hardworking, shy and kind-hearted guy. He always looks out for the people around him. He is justice-driven and will go to extreme lengths to ensure that everyone gets what they deserve.

In season one, following the collapse of his school, San Esteban, Samuel is injured and receives a scholarship — funded by Ventura Nunier, Marina's father — to attend the elite private school, Las Encinas. He is discriminated against due to his low-income background and those from wealthy families look down on him, particularly Guzmán. Despite Guzmán's disapproval, Samuel grows closer with his sister, Marina, and the two begin spending more and more time together; this is magnified when the two pair up for Martín's social media project. Tensions arise during the social media project, however, when Samuel finds out that Ventura and Teo — Carla's father — used cheap materials during the renovation of San Esteban, therefore insinuating that they were aware of the possibility of collapse. Furthermore, Marina is aware of documents and evidence that would incriminate her father. Samuel's relationship with Marina is tested when it is revealed that his brother owes a gang upwards of $60,000 for protection they provided while he was incarcerated. Nano learns of the incriminating evidence and asks Samuel to help in retrieving them in a bid to blackmail Marina's father for the money. Despite knowing it is morally incorrect, Samuel agrees to help Nano, and unsuccessfully attempts to obtain the documents.

Samuel eventually tells Nano that he can no longer help him. The relationship between them becomes strained when Samuel finds out that someone else slept with Marina and got her pregnant. While Samuel doesn't initially suspect that it was his own brother, Nano becomes wary and anxious that Samuel could find out at any moment. Eventually, Samuel finds out that it was Nano that slept with Marina and the two fight. He witnesses Nano running away from Marina's dead body the night she is murdered and tells the authorities that he believes Nano to be the killer.

In second season, Samuel tries to get closer to Carla to discover the real killer, but ends up falling in love with her. He befriends Rebe, who will help him with her investigations. At the end of the season, it is discovered that he and Guzmán faked kidnapping him to make Carla confess the truth. However, costing him the relationship they had built. During the third season, Samuel infiltrates Rebeka's house, by order of the inspector, to catch her mother. Also, he is expelled from Las Encinas for hitting Polo, being part of the cover-up of his murder after the party. Two months later, Samuel, Guzmán, Rebeka, Ander and Omar return to their last year in Las Encinas.

=== Guzmán Nunier ===
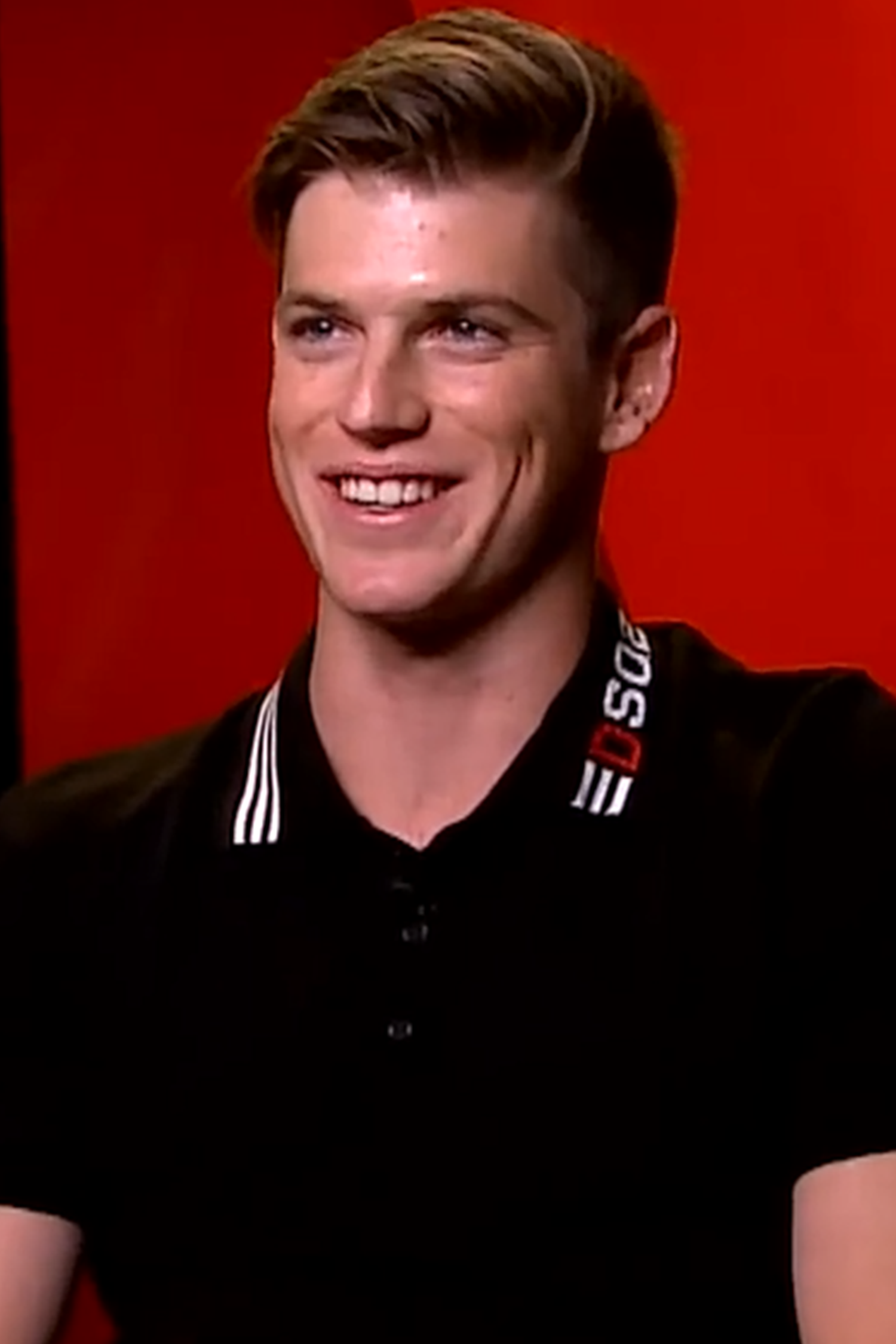
Miguel Bernardeau played Guzmán.

Guzmán Nunier Osuna (portrayed by Miguel Bernardeau) adopted brother of Marina, and Lu's ex-boyfriend, who falls for Nadia. A hot-headed popular guy at school. He believes his way is always the right way. He is extremely protective over his sister, and does not bond well with the transfer students. Guzmán is the adopted son of Laura and wealthy businessman Ventura Nunier. His biological parents died ten years ago from drug overdoses. Since he was a child, Guzmán has been best friends with Ander and Polo. He is regarded as the leader of this group and is loyal and supportive of his friends, but his actions can lean towards controlling at times.

When Nadia, Christian and Samuel arrive at Las Encinas, Guzmán is the primary culprit in trying to belittle them and make them feel small. He is derogatory towards Samuel referring to him as a waiter, and aggressively rude towards Christian who he finds particularly irritating. At the beginning of Season 1 Guzmán has a friends with benefits relationship with Lucrecia and the two of them are caught having sex in the school showers by Nadia. Worried that Nadia will use this against them Guzmán and Lu attempt to befriend Nadia and Guzmán even attempts to seduce her to ensure that she stays quiet. At Marina's party later that evening Guzmán continues to slag off the new students. When Nano arrives and shouts angrily about the inequality and unfairness in society Guzmán reacts strongly and threatens to have Samuel expelled for the outburst. However, Nadia threatens him, saying that should he do so, she will expose both himself and Lucrecia to the Principal for their promiscuous behavior. Although this saves Samuel from expulsion it also puts Nadia in Guzmán's direct line of vision and both him and Lu decide to get revenge. Lu suggests that they publicly humiliate Nadia by making her fall in love with Guzmán and then exposing her to the whole school. Guzmán agrees to this. The first episode also reveals the strain in Guzmán's family life. His sister Marina is HIV+, who was infected by Pablo, a former scholarship student at Las Encinas. Guzmán's hatred towards the scholarship students is largely due to his belief that they are all similar to Pablo.

Although Guzmán goes along with the plan to seduce Nadia, his affection towards Nadia gradually becomes genuine. When given the chance to take advantage of Nadia while she is drugged, Guzmán refuses to go through with it. Feeling repentant, Guzmán apologizes to Nadia and even visits her parents to ask their forgiveness, but Nadia stops him, but eventually decides to forgive him. His friendship with Nadia grows increasingly steady, much to Lucrecia and Yusef (Nadia's father)'s dismay. He confesses to Lu that he has fallen in love with Nadia, and she walks off in disbelief. After Yusef forbids Nadia from seeing Guzmán and from continuing her education at Las Encinas, he makes a deal with Yusef: he will end his friendship with Nadia so that she can stay at Las Encinas. After Marina's death, he drunkenly tries to commit suicide by falling off of a bridge, but Lu convinces him not to and the two resume their relationship.

=== Christian Varela ===
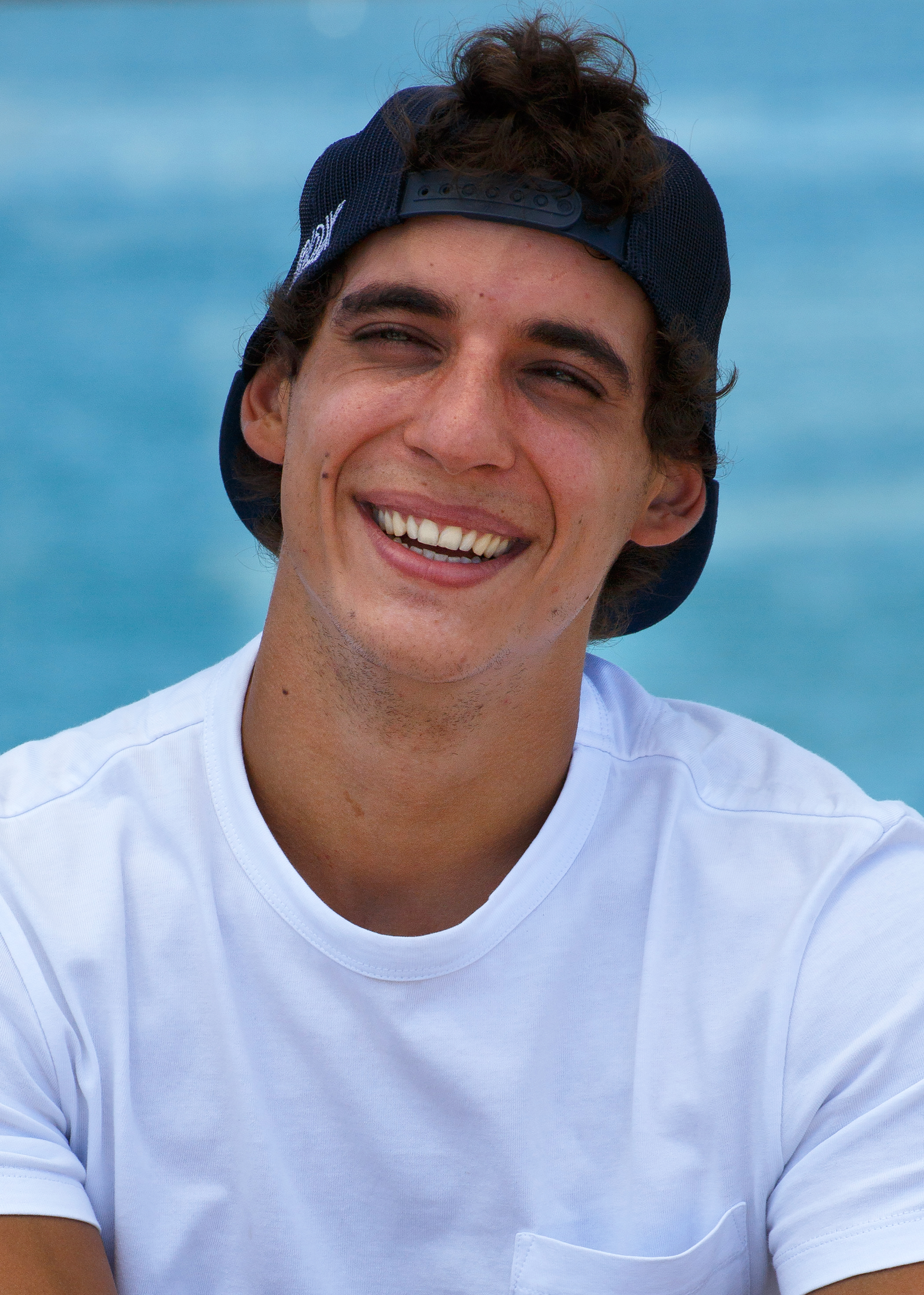
Miguel Herrán played Christian.

Christian Varela Expósito (portrayed by Miguel Herrán) one of three transfer students, who gets into a relationship with Polo and Carla. A comical and carefree transfer student who tries to stay connected with his past, while trying to assimilate with the richer students.

In season one, on his first day at Las Encinas, Christian immediately tries to integrate himself with the most popular crowd, but Guzmán belittles him and the others find him annoying, except Carla. At Marina's party, Carla seduces Christian, and has sex with him. Unbeknown to him, they are watched by Carla's boyfriend Polo. Eventually, Christian finds out that Polo has been encouraging Carla to have sex with others while he watches, and is initially freaked out by the idea but eventually accepts it and engages in a threesome with Carla and Polo. Christian goes with Carla and Polo to a fundraiser and meets their parents. While Polo's moms praise his ambition, Carla's mother expresses disapproval towards Christian, but Carla and Polo join Christian and leave after he takes a bottle of wine and kisses both of them. Christian's new polyamorous relationship starts to fall apart, however, when Polo becomes jealous and he and Carla suspect Christian when a collection of watches belonging to Carla's dad is stolen.

In season two, Christian struggles all summer, while on Carla's yacht, about the secret he was keeping for Polo and Carla about Marina's murder. Christian is also friends with Nano and feels extreme guilt that he knows how to get Nano out of jail. Carla tries to pull Christian in closer but she can tell he is pushing her away. She warns her father that he might tell everything. Christian leaves Teatro Barceló and tells Carla he is going to confess everything to the police. On his way home, drunk, he hits another car while on his motorcycle. The car flees the scene. Christian goes to the hospital and has serious surgery. He might never walk again. Carla's father bribes Christian- in exchange for keeping the secret, he will pay for his medical treatment in Switzerland. Christian accepts and spends the rest of the season in Switzerland, away from everyone.

=== Nano García ===
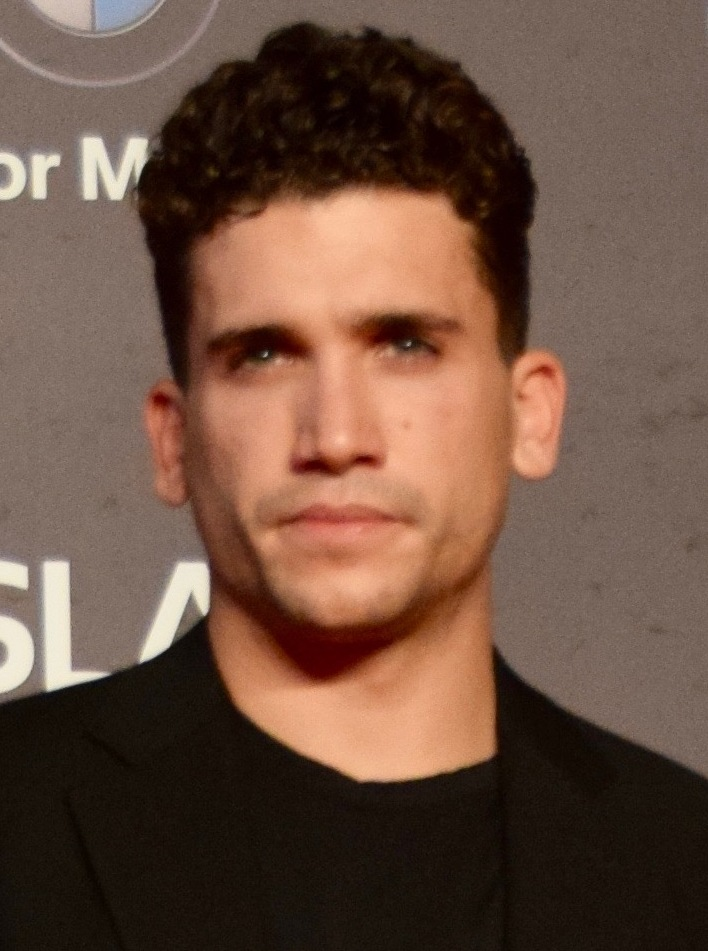
Jaime Lorente played Nano.

Fernando "Nano" García Domínguez (portrayed by Jaime Lorente), Samuel's older brother who just got out of prison, who is also a love interest of Marina. His handsome and dangerous aura draws Marina in. He struggles to pay a debt from prison and will do anything to get his hands on money. He is caring and sensitive to the people close to him. He often finds himself in trouble.

In season one, after getting out of prison, Nano is confronted about his promises of money, and tries to get Samuel to steal from Marina's wealthy family. When Samuel fails, Nano decides to steal the money himself, seducing and sleeping with Marina in order to get into their mansion. However, when he gets to the vault, Nano finds the money and evidence incriminating Marina's father is gone. Nano later learns that Marina is HIV-positive and confronts her, but she assures him that her medication prevents her from infecting others. Nano tells Marina to stop toying with Samuel, who clearly has feelings for her. After failing to pay back the thugs, they inflict a knife wound on Nano as a final warning. Injured, Nano staggers home to find Marina there while Samuel is in the bathroom. They keep Nano's problems a secret from Samuel, and Marina promises to get the money for him, eventually directing him to a collection of expensive watches belonging to Carla's father. After stealing them, Nano and Marina plan to leave town together, and it is revealed that Marina is pregnant. However, at the end of year celebration Marina is murdered. During the interrogation, Nano accuses Samuel of the crime but learns that Marina was planning to send him a message stating that she no longer wants to leave with him. Eventually, the authorities charge Nano with Marina's murder and arrest him.

In second season, all he wants is for his name to be cleared in the face of Marina's death. At the end of the season, he flees the city until Marina's murder and the real culprit are solved. Despite not making a physical appearance in the third season, an audio of Nano is heard by his family in the first episode, saying that Assilah is well and that he looks forward to seeing them. Over the course of the season, it is mentioned that he was caught again; however, he is eventually released.

=== Polo Benavent ===
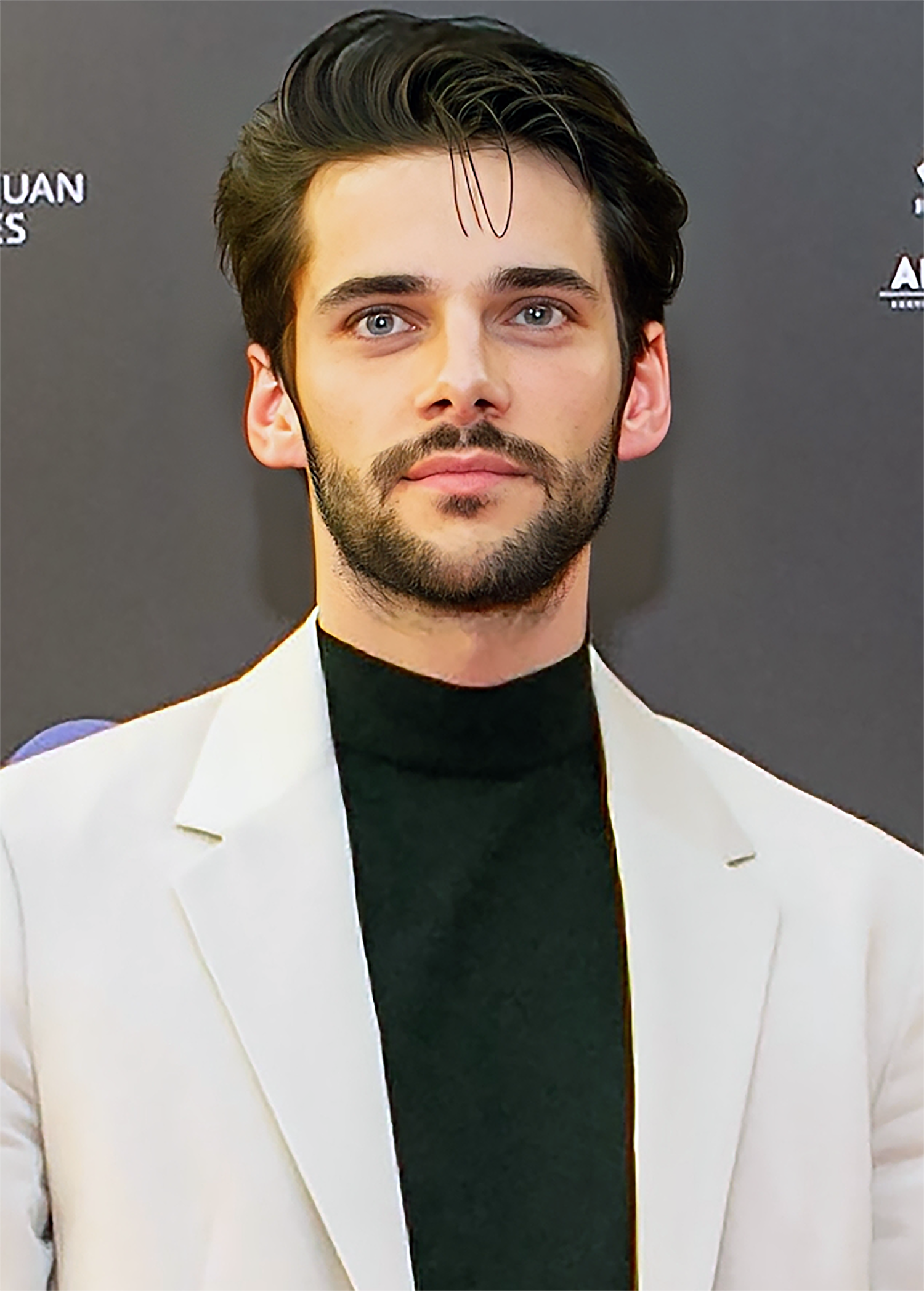
Álvaro Rico played Polo.

Leopoldo "Polo" Benavent Villada (portrayed by Álvaro Rico), he is submissive in nature and will follow the orders of the people he is close to. He is extremely wealthy, the son of two mothers, and has anxiety attacks.

In season one, Polo is a popular student at Las Encinas; he has been in a relationship with wealthy student Carla, since the two were twelve years old. Bored with their relationship — and on cue from Polo, who is beginning to explore his sexuality — Carla sleeps with new student, Christian, whilst Polo watches. They are eventually caught out on the situation, but are able to convince Christian that the trio should begin a polyamorous relationship. The three enjoy a relationship for a while, however it begins to unravel when Polo and Christian — on urge from Polo — begin to exclude Carla from the relationship. Christian hints that he believes this to be weird, however engages in sexual acts with Polo alone despite this. The relationship breaks down completely, however when Carla and Polo point fingers at Christian for stealing Carla's father's watch — a watch containing vital information that could criminally tie Carla and Guzmán's parents to the collapse of San Esteban. Eventually, Carla breaks off her relationship with Polo, and begins exclusively dating Christian. This is problematic and extremely difficult for Polo to deal with, and he becomes determined to win Carla back — to do this, he pursues the watch, which he knows is in Marina's possession. One night at the school pool (during the dance), Polo approaches Marina and demands she hands over the watch. Marina begins toying with Polo and refuses to hand over the watch, pointing out that Polo is wrong to think Carla would get back with him for retrieving the watch. Marina begins laughing at him, and he becomes increasingly more annoyed. Polo warns her not to mess with him, causing her to slap him and walk away. As she attempts to walk away, Polo — in a mad rush — picks up the nearby trophy and hits Marina over the head. Marina begins bleeding out and, afraid that he will be caught, Polo takes the watch and leaves her bleeding out in the school pool. She dies moments later. Polo has no choice but to tell Carla and Christian what he has done. Both are shocked at the situation, however attempt to cover up the murder. Christian gives Polo his shirt and the three hide the trophy. They return to the dance and talk no more of the events that have unfolded. When he is interviewed by the inspector, Polo does not tell her anything, simply remarking that he and Marina were friends.

In season two, Polo returns to Las Encinas following the summer holiday. He talks with Carla, who is afraid that Christian is on the verge of spilling their secret. Despite this, Polo does not seem too bothered about the situation, and just wishes to get on with the school year; Polo warns Christian to keep his mouth shut if he knows what is good for him. When Carla's father silences Christian — by hitting him with his car — Christian is left injured, and Carla tells Polo that he will not walk again. Polo does not respond, however Carla asks if he knows anything about it, given that she is not aware her father is responsible. Polo becomes disoriented and confused, and rejects Guzmán's help to keep him steady; he begins having a panic attack and Guzmán gives him pills he has been taking to combat his anxiety. Polo eventually begins to relax following Marina's wake, and it seems that everything is back to normal. After a drunk Guzmán begs Polo and Ander to stay over after the wake, the two sleep over at Guzmán's house. When he falls asleep, however, Polo and Ander begin making out, and eventually masturbate with each other. The following morning, Polo pretends that he is asleep, and watches as Ander and Guzmán watch videos of Marina, visibly upset. The following days are awkward for Polo and Ander, and the two barely talk. In the changing room at school, Polo questions why Ander will no longer reply to his texts, or help him with chemistry; Ander tells Polo he reminds him that he cheated on Omar, and that he should ask Guzmán for help. Polo cannot stand to ask Guzmán for help, given his guilt, and suffers in silence with studying — he begins experiencing hallucinations of blood, a sign of guilt over his actions. Guzmán and Polo talk, and Polo reveals to Guzmán that he's had an anxiety disorder since he was twelve, and that the pills he's been taking for it are no longer effective; he struggles to differentiate between fantasy and reality.

At the club that night, Polo becomes a recluse and it is clear that he cannot control himself. Ander finds him alone and looking worse for wear in the bathroom, and questions if he is alright. Polo reveals that he has been missing for over an hour and nobody has noticed. Ander offers to take Polo home, and when they get there, Ander begs Polo to tell him the truth, and that nothing will change between them. Polo reveals that he killed Marina, and Ander is no longer able to look at him. Polo begs Ander not to leave him, however Ander is unable to hold back the tears. Ander is enraged with Polo the following day, and questions why Polo would burden him with such knowledge. Ander tells Polo that he cannot keep the knowledge to himself, causing Polo to panic. Ander gives Polo twenty-four hours to tell Guzmán the truth, before he himself reveals the truth to Guzmán. Carla reassures him that the situation will be alright, and Polo uses this as an opportunity to try and get back with Carla — she pulls away, however when she notices Samuel watching. Fearful that the secret will get out, Carla suggests that Polo go to the police station and turn himself in; she believes the repercussions this way will be less than if he is publicly named the killer. The pressure from his friends and his guilt overwhelm Polo, leading to him attempt suicide, but is saved by Cayetana. Ander promises to keep his secret, as the two are childhood friends. The guilt gradually begins to build up in Carla, and she reveals to the police that Polo killed Marina, and she and Christian helped cover it up. The charges do not stick, however, and Polo is released due to a lack of evidence.

In season three, Polo returns to school following the announcement that Polo has been released on bail given there is no murder weapon in sight; only he and Cayetana are aware that the trophy is hidden at her address. He receives backlash from everyone at the school, and nobody but Cayetana is willing to associate with him during, or after, school hours. The judge orders that Polo and Carla will sit together in court and rehash their statements. Polo is visibly nervous, however before the confrontation begins, Carla retracts her previous accusations, remarking that she fabricated the story and is sorry for any pain she has caused Polo. The tension between Polo and Guzmán comes to a head after the charges are dropped. Polo begins warming back up to Guzmán, despite the conflict between the two, and they decide to skip school and play video games at Guzmán's place. Unbeknownst to Polo, however, Guzmán has spiked his drink and ties him up when he passes out. Polo is interrogated and abused by Guzmán whilst Samuel watches, and eventually he cracks, revealing that he did kill Marina, but accidentally. Polo's life becomes more and more difficult at Las Encinas, and it is quickly revealed that Guzmán and Samuel have been sending tweets about Polo, pretending to be him. Polo's parents find out about the tweet and upon confronting him, he tells the two that he wants to disappear. They offer to contact schools in England, allowing him to finish the semester there, instead of Las Encinas. Polo and Cayetana, his girlfriend, begin a relationship with Lu's brother, Valerio. Polo's relationship with Valerio eventually grows, they fell in love and the three eventually become a three-way couple. The relationship between Polo, Cayetana and Valerio comes to an end, however, when it is revealed that Valerio was involved in drug dealing; an act that almost got Carla killed.

Despite trying to redeem himself previously, Polo eventually realises that the best course of action is to turn himself in. He arrives at the graduation party, but he is immediately met with hatred upon entering the venue, and Samuel attempts to stab him. In the toilet, Polo is drying off, when Lu approaches with the broken bottle-neck seen earlier. She threatens Polo with the bottle-neck and the two get into a heated argument. The argument escalates and Lu accidentally stabs Polo with the bottle-neck when pushing him. Polo leaves the toilet bleeding, and heads to Guzmán for help. Losing his balance, he bangs his head on the glass that had previously been cracked days earlier. Unable to get his balance, Polo falls from the second floor onto the dancefloor below. Guzmán witnesses the incident and calls out for Polo, rushing to the dancefloor below. Realising that Polo is about to die, Guzmán begins to tear up and tells Polo that he forgives him for his sister's death.

=== Ander Muñoz ===
Arón Piper played Ander.

Ander Muñoz (portrayed by Arón Piper), he is a star athlete and under constant pressure from his parents to excel in everything he does. This pushes him to take drugs. He is driven to get what he wants while caring deeply for the people that matters most to him.

In season one, after Christian introduces Ander to his drug dealer, Omar, he feels an instant connection, but both deny their feelings due to fear of persecution or discrimination. Ander then gets in trouble with his father, who finds his stash of weed (Guzmán tells him). Omar and Ander become intimate on several occasions, but at Samuel's party, Ander becomes hostile under the influence of drugs which causes Omar to avoid him, but the two eventually reconcile. Guzmán becomes concerned upon learning that Omar is a drug dealer, but he and Samuel see Ander and Omar making out and knows the truth of them. However, when Omar's sister Nadia finds out, she fears that his parents will find out, and breaks things off with Ander, although Nadia proves to be supportive and encourages Omar to go and see Ander. Later when Guzmán goes to confront Nano - who has impregnated Marina - Ander and Polo go with him. In the ensuing chaos, Ander is severely bashed by Nano's friends, causing Omar to help and declare "I love you". At the end of year celebration, Ander and Omar make the most of their time together, since Omar's father has grounded him.

Throughout season two, Ander struggles with his relationship with Omar. Initially Ander comes by Omar's family store to go secretly see Omar for ten minutes at a time. After Omar leaves his family's home after feeling suffocated by his dad and family, Ander and his mom take him in. Ander is initially happy that Omar is with him and free, but as Omar begins to change, Ander pushes him away, missing the "old Omar". Polo confesses to Ander what really happened to Marina, and who killed her. Throughout the season, Ander struggles with the extreme guilt of knowing what happened. He never tells Guzmán, protecting Polo's secret. This eats at him, and he pushes everyone around him away as he declines into depression and uses partying and alcohol as an escape. Eventually he opens up to Omar.

In season three, Ander is diagnosed with cancer. He initially hides the diagnosis from his family and friends, but he later confides in Rebeka after she sees him crying after an interview with a university recruiter. Two months later, Samuel, Guzmán, Rebeka, Ander and Omar return to their last course in Las Encinas, because they decided to repeat it again. In the fourth season, he maintains a polyamorous relationship with Omar and the new student, Patrick, for whom he feels a great sexual attraction. Finally, he ends his relationship with Omar, whom he says he will always love, and leaves Las Encinas with Guzmán to backpack around the world for a year.

=== Nadia Shanaa ===
Mina El Hammani played Nadia.

Nadia Shanaa (portrayed by Mina El Hammani), one of three transfer students, the daughter of Palestinian immigrants. She is academically driven and holds her religious and personal values close to her.

In season one, on her first day at her new illustrious private school, Nadia is warned by the principal to remove her hijab or face expulsion. She is greeted by many of the students with disdain and experiences prejudice and ignorant comments. Nadia makes other students aware of her ambition when she is asked to introduce herself to the class. She shows interest in the scholarship which is awarded at the end of every school year. Even without her hijab, Nadia faces prejudice and ignorant comments from other students, who compare her to Islamic terrorist groups. After Nadia catches Guzmán and Lu in the school showers together, they start a bet with each other to see if Guzmán can seduce Nadia. Despite his efforts, Nadia remains immune to his charms but starts to warm up to him. Guzmán also starts to genuinely respect Nadia and, when given the opportunity to take advantage of her while she is drugged and ruin her reputation, Guzmán refuses to go through with it. Lu, jealous, and informs Nadia of her bet with Guzmán to drive a wedge between the two. After the confrontation, Guzmán tries to earn Nadia's forgiveness by buying her a gift, and when that doesn't work, he attempts to apologize to Nadia's family, to her dismay. After overhearing Samuel and Marina talk about Marina's pregnancy, Nadia gives Marina a number to an abortion clinic and apologizes to Marina for not being there for her.

In the second season, Nadia continues to deal with her affair with Guzmán, however, she now has Rebeka, a new friend who will help her let go of her religion. Valerio records a video of her and Guzmán having sex in the Encinas locker room, causing Nadia to worry that her parents will discover that video. In the third season, Nadia meets Malick, a rich young Muslim who attends Las Encinas, and little by little begins to have a relationship with him. At the end of the season, he is part of Lu's cover-up of Polo's murder, graduates and gets Polo's mothers' scholarship, leaving with Lu and Nadia to New York, promising Guzmán that he would come back for their relation. In the fourth season, she reappears by video call from New York to end her relationship with Guzmán.

In season 8, she returns to Madrid, and tries to help Omar with his anxiety attacks, and on the last episode, she and Omar go to Virginia and officially shut down Las Encinas.

=== Carla Rosón ===
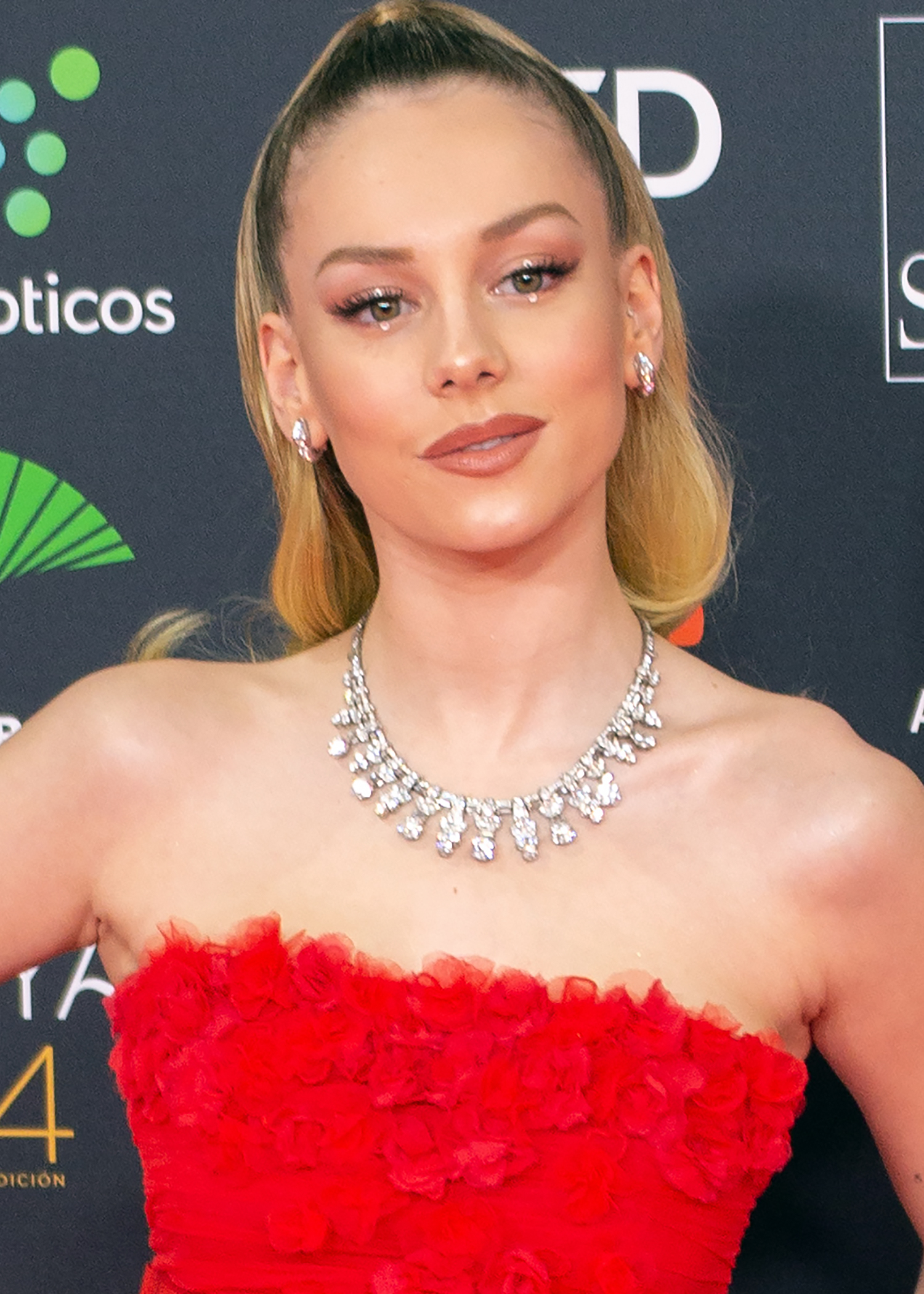
Ester Expósito played Carla.

Carla Rosón Caleruega (portrayed by Ester Expósito), she is the daughter of a Marchioness and is extremely wealthy. She uses her sexuality to get what she wants. A softer side of her is shown as she cares about the people she loves and will go to extreme lengths to cover up their faults and supports them.

In season one, upon becoming bored with their lives and their predetermined futures, Carla and Polo decide to add some spice to their romantic life by including Christian. At Marina's party, Carla seduces and has sex with Christian, but Polo watches, unbeknownst to Christian. Eventually when Christian finds out, he is uncomfortable with the idea, but later goes back and has a threesome with Carla and Polo. Carla brings Polo and Christian to a fundraiser and responds to her mother's disapproval by making out with both boys and giving her the finger before leaving with her boyfriends. When Polo starts sabotaging Christian's opportunity to become a model, Carla accuses Polo of being jealous but does not specify who he is jealous of. After Marina tells the class that she has HIV, Carla invites her over, but Marina discovers a collection of expensive watches and tells Nano about it so he can steal them. Carla and Polo suspect Christian stole the watches and approach him about it, to his anger. She later becomes an accomplice to Marina's murder, helping to cover up for Polo.

In the second season, Carla tries to continue with her life after Marina's death, in addition to dealing with her father, who knows that Polo is the murderer, and will prevent the truth from being known. After Samuel tries to get closer to her, Carla begins to fall in love with him. With the feelings developed for Samuel and the supposed disappearance of him, she confesses everything to the inspector. In the third season, she decides to say that everything she had said about her father and Polo, she did out of spite and revenge, since her father threatened to make her mother sink if he fell. In this season she meets Yeray, a young man whom she defended when she was overweight, and with whom she ends up having a relationship. With pressure from her parents for Yeray's fortune, she ends up getting into drugs. At the end of the season, Carla graduates, Yeray helps her to be free, since she signs a contract with her father by which she decides to be a partner only if she transfers her empire to Carla, and she is also a participant in the cover-up of Polo's murder.

=== Omar Shanaa ===
Omar Shanaa (portrayed by Omar Ayuso), Nadia's brother, he is a closeted gay guy who struggles with pleasing his parents while living his true self. He dealt drugs to make enough money to move out. He is shy, detail-oriented and best friends with Samuel.

In season one, However, he is introduced by Christian to Ander. Believing that Samuel is too innocent he does not confide in him about his dealing nor his sexuality. After Ander smokes pot he sets up an online dating profile and matches with an anonymous man who asks him to meet. It is soon revealed to be Omar. At first Omar is wary of starting anything with Ander as he sees it to be too much of a risk. Omar's secrets are revealed to Nadia by Guzmán in an argument. Nadia confronts Omar and begs him to stop dealing, she also advises him to 'set aside' being gay for a few years. Omar defends himself and argues that he 'has the right to live his own life.' Omar starts selling marijuana to Samuel's girlfriend Marina but warns her that it is very strong and to be careful. Marina does not listen however and passes out on two occasions due to its effects. The second time she is caught it is in front of the principal. Upon interrogation, Marina is forced to reveal that it was Omar who sold her the drugs. Omar and Nadia's father is called into the school and Omar's bad habits are revealed which causes his father to fly into a rage. In disgrace, Omar is forced to remain in the family shop at all times and is treated with hostility by his father. His father also begins planning an arranged marriage for Omar with a Muslim girl, Zahira, who lives in the town. Later, Ander's mother accidentally reveals that Omar is gay. Yusef rushes back to the store and violently confronts Omar begging him to deny his homosexuality. Afraid of his father's reaction and his disappointment, Omar denies the accusations. Omar attends the graduation part at Las Encidas with his sister and his father and uses it as an opportunity to spend some time with Ander. He tells him that he will not have much free time over the summer and his father will be watching him closely, he will however have ten minutes everyday when his father goes to the bank.

In the second season, Omar gets tired of his duties at the store, so he runs away from home and gets a job at a nightclub. In the third season, Omar continues with his work and his life with Ander, at first he worries about him and his health, however, by hiding his true condition from him, he feels left out. Omar meets Malick, the boyfriend of his sister Nadia, at a special dinner organized by him, with whom he begins a secret relationship, although they end up being discovered by Nadia. At the end of the season, he is part of the cover-up of Polo's murder, his parents finally accept him as he is and continue in his relationship with Ander. Two months later he enters Las Encinas, along with Samuel, Guzmán, Rebeka and Ander. In season four, there is a new principal at school who questions Omar's right to be there, looking at his academic history. Omar explains he works and he was taking care of his sick boyfriend last year which is why his grades are down, but the principal demands he take a placement test to pass. Knowing he's going to fail, Omar seeks the help of Patrick, the principal's son, through his boyfriend Ander. Patrick gives Omar the answers and Omar passes the exam, much to the surprise of the principal. Eventually Omar becomes involved with Patrick.

=== Lu Montesinos ===
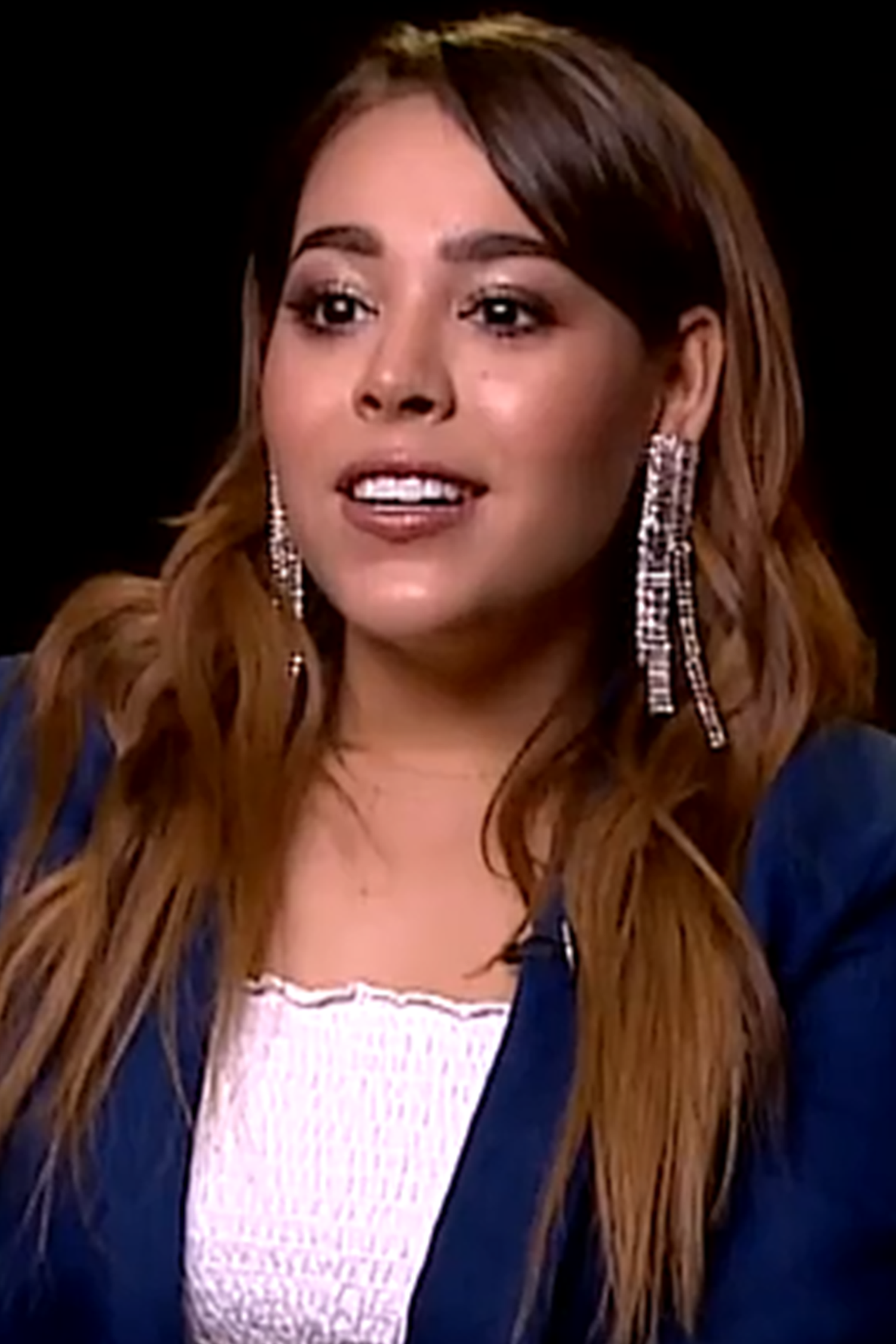
Danna Paola played Lu.

Lucrecia "Lu" Montesinos Hendrich (portrayed by Danna Paola), she is strong-witted, competitive and manipulative. She will go to extreme lengths to secure what she believes will bring her happiness; however, she is aware that she will never be satisfied no matter how much she has.

In season one, Lu is not happy when new students arrive. First, because she is reluctant to rub shoulders with people from a different background, and also because she fears school competition, especially from Nadia. When Nadia caught Lu and Guzmán having sex in the bathroom, Lu urges Guzmán to seduce Nadia to humiliate her. When he feels real feelings for Nadia, Lu gets jealous. In season 2, Lu has her brother, Valerio, back in her life. They have a secret romantic relationship that is very taboo. She hooks up with Valerio while continuing to date Guzmán. She comforts Guzmán after Marina's death and spent the summer in Asturias with his family. Lu is completely dedicated to Guzmán, but realizing he doesn't love her – he dumps her for Nadia. Lu befriends Cayetana during the season, while her friendship with Carla continues to suffer. Upon finding out that Cayetana is a liar, Lu publicly shames her and everyone else who has crossed her in her life at a public event. At the end of the season, her father discovers her incestuous relationship with her stepbrother.

In season three, she decides to confess to her father that her relationship with Valerio was consensual, so her father decides to cut Lu and Valerio off all financial support. Realizing that she won't be able to pay for university, Lu realizes she needs to apply for a scholarship. She applies for the Columbia University scholarship, the same one that Nadia wants. They compete for the scholarship throughout the season but Nadia wins it. Nadia and Lu started to form a friendship despite all of this, and Nadia agrees to share the scholarship, 50-50. At the graduation party, Lu gets in a verbal argument with Polo. She was holding a broken champagne bottle and without fully realizing what she was doing, stabbed him. Polo dies and Lu freaks out. All of her friends band together to make sure that Lu doesn't receive the blame. At the end of the season, she, Nadia, and Malick travel to United States to study at university.

=== Valerio Montesinos ===
Valerio Montesinos Rojas (portrayed by Jorge López), he is Lu's half-brother and a new student at Las Encinas as of the second season. He is a young Chilean who uses drugs and is a womanizer, even with his own half-sister.

In season two, Valerio returns to Las Encinas, after spending some time away in boarding school due to bad behavior. He returns with the intent of reconciling his relationship with Lu. Recognizing that Guzmán is vulnerable, he offers him an escape in the form of drugs, knowing that this is something that will disgust Lu. He also flirts with Rebeka. Following her breakup with Guzmán, Lu begins to threaten Nadia, telling her to fail all of her exams if she doesn't want her fling with Guzmán to be reported to her parents. Nadia confides in Valerio who advises her to tell Lu that if she continues to threaten her she will tell the whole school about the 'Valerio Thing'. After telling Nadia the truth, Valerio records her and Guzmán having sex in the locker room and shows the video to Lu, who broadcasts the video throughout the school in a fit of rage. Valerio is disgusted by Lu's actions and, to get revenge, reveals his incestuous relationship to his father.

In season three, Valerio is kicked out of his house and disinherited by his father, so he ends up living with Samuel, as well as doing drug deals with Rebeka. He also begins a love threesome with Polo and Cayetana, which ends when Polo finds out that Valerio gave Carla drugs. He is expelled from Las Encinas, along with Rebeka, when Azucena discovers his drug dealings. At the end of the season, he is part of the cover-up of Polo's murder, and is appointed by Carla as the manager of the Caleruega wine cellar, in her absence.

=== Rebeka Parrilla ===
Rebeka "Rebe" Parrilla de Bormujo Ávalos (portrayed by Claudia Salas), she is different from the other wealthier students in her class as she likes to flaunt her wealth through her clothes and jewellery extravagantly. She was not born into wealth which causes her to sympathise a lot with Nadia, Omar and Samuel. Her mother engages in the drug business.

In season two, as the season progresses, Rebeka shows an interest in helping Samuel stay well and out of harm's way, and helping him with his brother's bail, by having Samuel work with his mother. Rebeka is worried about Samuel's disappearance, thinking that she was to blame for everything.

In season three, Rebeka is overwhelmed by her mother's business and begins a brief relationship with Samuel. After the arrest of her mother, she decides to have a drug sales business together with Valerio when she has to find a way to pay her tuition at Las Encinas. After a trap to find out who sent her mother to jail, Rebeka learns that it was Samuel who sold her, so she breaks her friendship with him. She is also expelled from Las Encinas when Azucena discovers the business she has with Valerio. At the end of the season, she is part of the cover-up of Polo's murder, she recovers her mother and together they hope to live a decent life. Two months later, Samuel, Guzmán, Rebeka, Ander and Omar return to their last year in Las Encinas. In season four, Rebeka meets Mencía, a new student at Las Encinas, who immediately takes a liking to her. However, upon finding out that she's the new strict principal's daughter, Rebe distances herself immediately.

=== Cayetana Grajera ===
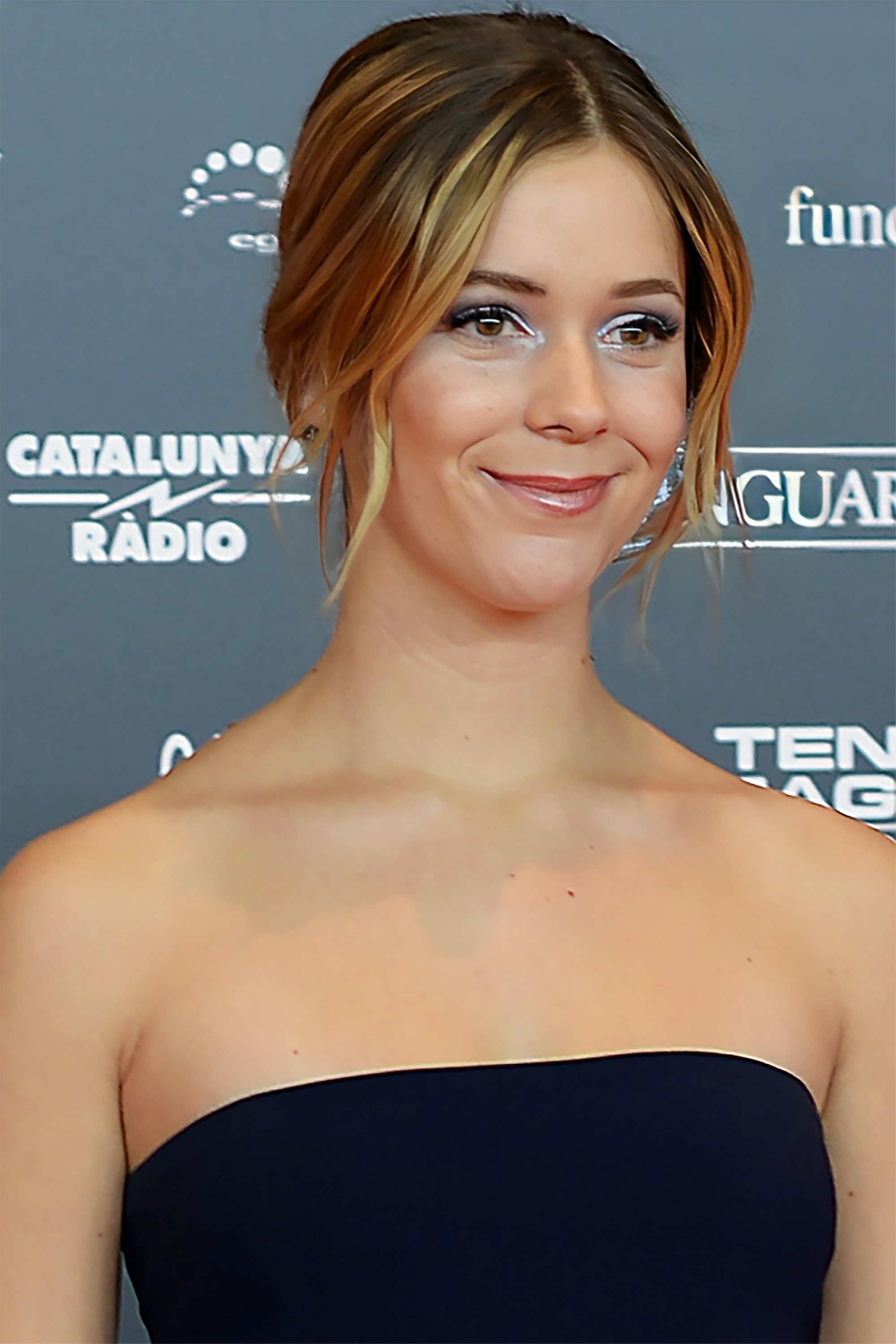
Georgina Amorós played Cayetana.

Cayetana "Caye" Grajera Pando (portrayed by Georgina Amorós), the daughter of a cleaning lady who lives a fraudulent lifestyle and she is manipulative to the extent of fabricating a whole lifestyle to assimilate with the wealthier students in her class.

In season two, she goes to great lengths to be part of Lu's circle of friends; likewise, she falls in love with Polo. After Lu discovers Cayetana's lies, she exposes her to prevent her from scamming people who wanted to help with a cause she had invented. At the end of the season, Polo confesses to Cayetana what he did, prompting Cayetana to find the trophy in the lake and hide it to cover up Marina's murder.

In season three, she earns the contempt of some of her classmates by being with Polo, with whom she plans to go to the same university. Over the course of the season, she starts a polyamorous relationship that includes Valerio. At the end of the season, she graduates and is part of the cover-up of Polo's murder, although she is shown as one of the most affected by his death. Two months later, Cayetana is shown as one of the cleaners at Las Encinas.

In season four, Cayetana is still working as a janitor while going to university. She is still friends with the old crew of people and hangs out with them outside of school. Once she realizes that Prince Phillipe is going to go to Las Encinas, she can't contain her excitement. She approaches him and tells him she loves his fashion taste and interest in designers and that she shares the same interests, leading to several stories that revolve around consent, attempted rape, and sexual harassment.

== Secondary characters ==
Legend
= Recurring cast (actor appears in two or more episodes that season)
= Guest cast (actor appears in one episode that season)

| Character | Portrayed by | Seasons | | | | | | |
| Character | Portrayed by | 1 | 2 | 3 | 4 | 5 | 6 | 7 |
|---|---|---|---|---|---|---|---|---|
| Inspectora | Ainhoa Santamaría | Recurring | Recurring | Recurring | | | | |
| Martín | Jorge Suquet | Recurring | | | | | | |
| Ventura Nunier | Ramón Esquinas | Recurring | Recurring | Recurring | | | | |
| Pilar Domínguez | Irene Arcos | Recurring | Recurring | Guest | | | | |
| Yusef Shana | Abdelatif Hwidar | Recurring | Recurring | Recurring | | | | Guest |
| Azucena Muñoz | Elisabet Gelabert | Recurring | Recurring | Recurring | Recurring | | | |
| Laura Osuna | Rocío Muñoz-Cobo | Recurring | Recurring | Recurring | | | | |
| Antonio Muñoz | Alfredo Villa | Recurring | Guest | | | | | |
| Imán Shanaa | Farah Hamed | Recurring | Recurring | Recurring | | | | Guest |
| Beatriz Caleruega | Lola Marceli | Recurring | Recurring | Recurring | | | | |
| Teodoro "Teo" Rosón | Rubén Martínez | Recurring | Recurring | Recurring | | | | |
| Andrea Villada | Liz Lobato | Recurring | Guest | Recurring | | | | |
| Begoña Benavent | Yaiza Guimaré | Guest | Recurring | Recurring | | | | |
| Pablo Ruiz | Alberto Vargas | Guest | | | | | | |
| Sandra López Gallego | Eva Llorach | | Recurring | Recurring | Recurring | | | |
| Victoria Pando | Marta Aledo | | Recurring | | | | | |
| Felipe Montesinos | Bruno Lastra | | Recurring | Guest | | | | |
| Alexis Fernández | Jorge Clemente | | | Recurring | | | | |
| Ander's doctor | Jon Rod | | | Recurring | | | | |
| Bill McKinley | Kevin McHale | | | Guest | | | | |
| Inspector Sebastián Abaga | Boré Buika | | | | Recurring | Recurring | | |
| Estefanía von Triesenberg | Rachel Lascar | | | | Recurring | Guest | | |
| Elodie | Louvia Bachelier | | | | | Guest | | |
| Greta | Iria del Río | | | | | Recurring | | |
| Jess | Isabel Garrido | | | | | Recurring | | |
| Felipe Ciprian | Àlex Monner | | | | | Recurring | | |
| Virginia | Godeliv Van den Brandt | | | | | | Recurring | Recurring |
| Roberta Artiñán | Luz Cipriota | | | | | | Recurring | Recurring |
| María | Olaya Caldera | | | | | | Recurring | Recurring |
| Alfonso | Pepe Ocio | | | | | | Recurring | Recurring |
| Pau | Raúl Mérida | | | | | | Recurring | Recurring |
| Luena | María Ordóñez | | | | | | | Recurring |
| José Luis | Alfons Nieto | | | | | | | Guest |
| Mateo | Bernabé Fernández | | | | | | | Guest |
| Catalina | Astrid Jones | | | | | | | Recurring |

== Elite: Short Stories ==
In May 2021, Netflix announced #EliteWeek, a week-long special of short episodes that act as a prelude to the fourth season titled Elite: Short Stories. The stories are set to "expand the Elite universe." They are not a spin-off show, but more like vignettes to bridge content that lead up to the fourth season; there are four stories, each consisting of three short episodes. The stories take place during the summer before the start of the new year in Las Encinas. In the four stories, different plots of some of the most veteran students of Las Encinas and newer ones will be explored, revealing what they have been up to in the last summer before starting their new school year. The stories are set between the events of the third and the fourth season. In October 2021, Netflix announced three new stories, set during the holiday season, will be released in December of that year. These three episodes are set between the events of the fourth and the fifth season.

Legend
= Main cast (credited)
= Recurring cast (actor appears in two or more episodes that 'stories')
= Guest cast (actor appears in one episode that 'stories')

| Character | Portrayed by | Seasons | |
| Character | Portrayed by | 1 | 2 |
Main characters
| Guzmán Nunier | Miguel Bernardeau | Main | |
| Rebeka "Rebe" Parrilla | Claudia Salas | Main (Note: Claudia Salas is credited as a regular in episode 2 of Omar Ander Alexis, episode 1 of Phillipe Caye Felipe and episode 3 of Samuel Omar.) | Main |
| Cayetana "Caye" Grajera | Georgina Amorós | Main (Note: Georgina Amorós is credited as a series regular in episode 3 of Samuel Omar.) | Main |
| Nadia Shanaa | Mina El Hammani | Main | |
| Omar Shanaa | Omar Ayuso | Main (Note: Omar Ayuso is credited as a series regular in episodes 1 and 2 of Nadia Guzmán and Omar Ander Alexis.) | Main |
| Ander Muñoz | Arón Piper | Main | |
| Alexis Fernández | Jorge Clemente | Main | |
| Carla Rosón | Ester Expósito | Main | |
| Samuel "Samu" García | Itzan Escamilla | Main | Main |
| Phillipe von Triesenberg | Pol Granch | | Main |
| Estefanía von Triesenberg | Rachel Lascar | | Main (Note: Rachel Lascar is credited as a series regular in episode 1 of Phillipe Caye Felipe.) |
| Lara Zurita | Celia Sastre | | Main |
| Felipe Ciprian | Àlex Monner | | Main |
| Benjamín Blanco | Diego Martín | | Main (Note: Diego Martín is credited as a series regular in episode 2 of Samuel Omar.) |
| Patrick Blanco | Manu Ríos | | Main |
| Ariadna "Ari" Blanco | Carla Díaz | | Main |
| Mencía Blanco | Martina Cariddi | | Main |
| Beni Vine | Iván Pellicer | | Main |
| Gastón Quesada | Junior Mbengani | | Main |
| Manu Fabré | Xóan Fórneas | | Main |
Recurring and guest characters
| Leopoldo "Polo" Benavent | Álvaro Rico | Voice (Note: Voice footage of Rico's character is heard during the first short story, but is not credited.) | |
| May Shanaa | Fariba Sheikhan | Guest | |
| Patrick's Mother | Mariam Torres | | Guest |
| Patrick Blanco (child) | Óliver Sánchez | | Guest |
