= Raqqa: Spy vs. Spy =

- Theatrical release poster
- Spanish: Raqa
- Directed by: Gerardo Herrero
- Screenplay by: Irene Zoe Alameda
- Based on: Virgins and Executioners by Tomás Bárbulo
- Produced by: Mariela Besuievsky; Gerardo Herrero
- Starring: Álvaro Morte; Mina El Hammani; Abdelatif Hwidar; Fariba Sheikhan; Ben Temple; Sara Hwidar; Cristina Kovani; Déborah François; Ali El Aziz; Juan Carlos Vellido
- Cinematography: Juan Carlos Gómez
- Edited by: Clara Martínez Malagelada
- Music by: Paula Olaz
- Production companies: Tornasol Media; Malika y el Saharaui AIE; Angle Production
- Distributed by: DeAPlaneta (es)
- Release dates: 10 November 2024 (Seville); 22 November 2024 (Spain)
- Countries: Spain; Morocco; Germany
- Languages: Arabic; English; Spanish

Raqqa: Spy vs. Spy (Spanish: Raqa) is a 2024 spy thriller film directed by Gerardo Herrero from a screenplay by Irene Zoe Alameda based on a novel by Tomás Bárbulo. It is a Spanish-Moroccan-German co-production.

== Plot ==
Set in ISIS-controlled Raqqa, the plot follows mercenary spy Haibala (serving Russian interests) and Ceuta nurse/spy Malika (working via Europol), both chasing ISIS leader "The Jordanian".

== Cast ==
- Álvaro Morte as Haibala aka "El Saharaui"
- Mina El Hammani as Malika
- Abdelatif Hwidar as El Mauritano
- Fariba Sheikhan as Jamsa
- Ben Temple as Khaled
- Sara Hwidar as Muna
- Cristina Kovani as Alia
- Déborah François as Josephine
- Juan Carlos Vellido as El Argentino

== Production ==
The film was produced by Tornasol Media and Malika y el Saharaui AIE alongside Angle Production. Shooting locations included Casablanca, Marrakesh, and locations in Navarre such as Bardenas Reales.

== Release ==
The film screened at the 21st Seville European Film Festival on 10 November 2024. It is set to be released theatrically in Spain on 22 November 2024.

== Reception ==
Jonathan Holland of ScreenDaily wrote that "while the events and coincidences pile up too quickly, meaning that characters and issues who deserve more time lack depth, this efficient picture still merits international attention".

== See also ==
- List of Spanish films of 2024
