= Itzan Escamilla =

Spanish actor (born 1997)

- Born: Itzan Escamilla Guerrero; 31 October 1997 (age 29); Madrid, Spain
- Education: Cristina Rota School of Dramatic Arts
- Occupation: Actor
- Years active: 2016–present
- Relatives: Teo Escamilla (grandfather)

Itzan Escamilla Guerrero (born 31 October 1997) is a Spanish actor. He is best known for his lead role of Samuel García Domínguez in the Netflix thriller teen drama series Élite.

== Early life ==
Escamilla was born on 31 October 1997, in Madrid, Spain, and was raised in Hortaleza. He is the son of television producer Jacobo Escamilla and model Silvia Guerrero, and the grandson of cinematographer Teo Escamilla. Growing up, he initially considered careers in architecture and later neurology, but discovered an interest in acting after taking part in a short film for an audiovisual class project at school. He later studied acting at the Cristina Rota School of Dramatic Arts in Madrid.

== Career ==
Escamilla began his acting career in 2016 with minor appearances in the Spanish television series Seis Hermanas and Centro Médico. He also appeared in the second season of the crime mystery series Víctor Ros as Juan, the protagonist's godson, which marked his first long-running television role.

In 2017, Escamilla made minor appearances in the adventure series El final del camino as Gonzalo, the fantasy series The Ministry of Time as a young Simón Bolívar, and the Netflix period drama series Cable Girls as a young Francisco Gómez. That year, he also appeared in Los universos paralelos, a Spanish adaptation of David Lindsay-Abaire's stage play Rabbit Hole, directed by David Serrano.

In 2018, Escamilla became internationally known for his portrayal of Samuel García Domínguez on the Netflix teen drama series Élite, in which he appeared for its first five seasons. In 2020, he made his feature film debut in Carlos Val's Planeta 5000, starring alongside Kimberley Tell. He also voiced Jack Redfield in the Netflix animated series The Idhun Chronicles, an adaptation of Laura Gallego's book series of the same name. In 2021, Escamilla starred in Jaime Olías' crime drama short film Chaval, for which he won the 2021 Cortogenia Award for Best Male Performance.

In 2022, he was cast in the Mexican Apple TV medical drama series Midnight Family, based on the 2019 documentary film of the same name. The series premiered on 25 September 2024, and its cast received a 2025 Aura Award nomination for Best Ensemble. Also in 2024, he appeared in Jurek Jablonicky's short film Perséfone and Susan Béjar's comedy film Un lío de millones, a Spanish remake of Alexandra Leclère's 2021 French film Mes très chers enfants.

In 2025, Escamilla appeared in Ana Rujas' play La otra bestia, and in a Spanish-language adaptation of Lucy Prebble's play The Effect, directed by Juan Carlos Fisher. He appeared in the Disney+ comedy series Entrepreneurs, and portrayed Javier in Fernando Franco's psychological thriller film Subsuelo, which premiered at the 70th Valladolid International Film Festival in October 2025.

Escamilla is set to appear in En busca de Cortés, a documentary about the life of his grandfather Teo Escamilla, as well as Miguel Morillo's short film Trip to Nowhere, alongside Greta Fernández. He is also set to appear in the Disney+ series La increíble historia de Julia Pastrana.

== Personal life ==
Escamilla resides in Madrid, Spain.

In 2020, Escamilla and Gonzalo Vila co-founded Kopskam, an initiative promoting responsible internet and social media use among young people. Its first campaign, "Not a Social Guy", aimed to raise awareness of bullying and cyberbullying, with proceeds from the campaign's T-shirt sales donated to the Asociacíon Española para la Prevención del Acoso Escolar (AEPAE), a Spanish non-profit organisation dedicated to preventing school bullying.

== Filmography ==
=== Film ===
Year	Title	Role	Notes	Ref.
2020	Planeta 5000	Sergio		
2021	Chaval	Pablo	Short film	
2024	Perséfone	Benjamín	Short film	
2024	Un lío de millones	Sergio		
2025	Subsuelo	Javier		
TBA	En busca de Cortés †	Himself	Documentary film	
TBA	Trip to Nowhere †	TBA	Short film	

=== Television ===
Year	Title	Role	Notes	Ref.
2016	Seis Hermanas	Gorrilla	1 episode	
2016	Centro Médico	Isco	1 episode	
2016	Víctor Ros	Juan	7 episodes	
2017	The Ministry of Time	Young Simón Bolívar	Season 3; cameo	
2017	El final del camino	Gonzalo	2 episodes	
2017	Cable Girls	15-years-old Francisco Gómez	3 episodes	
2018–2022	Élite	Samuel García Domínguez	Lead role (seasons 1-5); 40 episodes	
2020–2021	The Idhun Chronicles	Jack Redfield	Voice	
2021	Élite historias breves: Carla Samuel	Samuel García Domínguez	Lead role; 3 episodes	
2021	Élite historias breves: Samuel Omar	Samuel García Domínguez	Lead role; 3 episodes	
2024	Midnight Family	Bernardo	10 episodes	
2025	Entrepreneurs	Cosmeteelmundo	3 episodes	
TBA	La increíble historia de Julia Pastrana †	TBA	Post-production	

=== Theatre ===
Year	Title	Role	Playwright	Ref.
2017	Los universos paralelos (Rabbit Hole)	David	David Lindsay-Abaire	
2025	La otra bestia	Lover	Ana Rujas	
2025-2026	The Effect	Tristán	Lucy Prebble	

=== Music videos ===
Year	Title	Artist	Role	Ref.
2016	"Vuelve"	Blackstone	Love Interest	
2018	"Final Feliz"	DANNA	Samuel García Domínguez	

== Awards and nominations ==
Year	Award	Category	Work	Result	Ref.
2021	22nd Cortogenia Awards	Best Male Performance	Chaval	Won	
2025	2nd Aura Awards	Best Ensemble	Midnight Family	Nominated	
