= Mina El Hammani =

Spanish actress

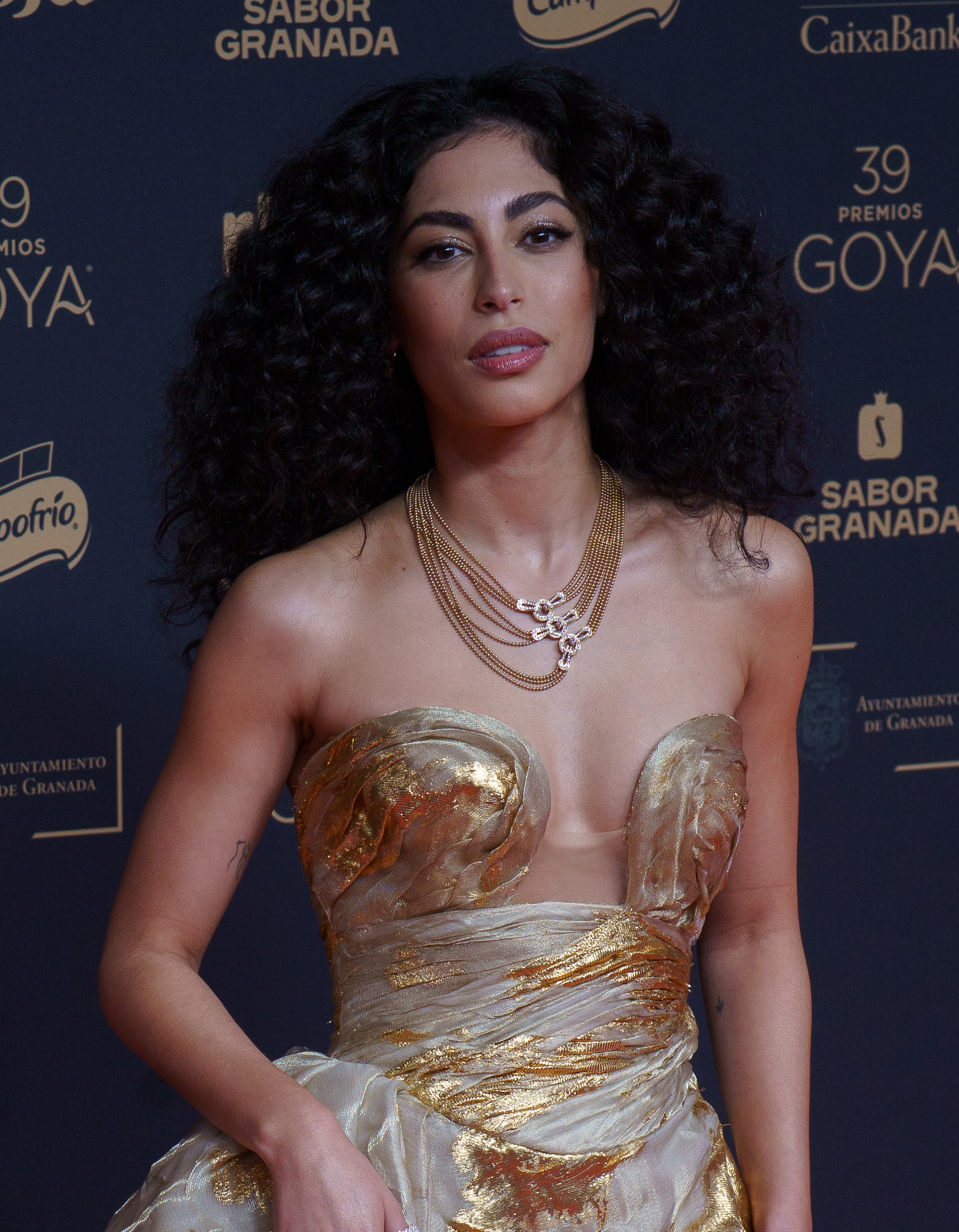
- El Hammani in 2025
- Born: 29 November 1993 (age 32); Madrid, Spain
- Occupation: Actress
- Years active: 2014–present

Mina El Hammani (Arabic: مينا الحماني; born 29 November 1993) is a Spanish actress best known for her role of 'Nadia' in the streaming television series Élite.

== Early life ==
Mina El Hammani was born and raised in Madrid. Her family is from Morocco. She began her acting career in 2014.

== Filmography ==
=== Television ===
Year	Title	Role	Notes	Ref.
2015	Centro médico	Amina	1 episode	
2015-2016	El Príncipe	Nur	15 episodes	
2016	La que se avecina	Fátima	1 episode	
2017	The State	Woman at Market	1 episode	
2017-2018	Servir y proteger	Salima Ben Ahmed	Season 1; 200 episodes	
2018-2021	Élite	Nadia Shanaa	Main cast (seasons 1-4); 28 episodes	
2024	Élite	Nadia Shanaa	Main cast (season 8); 4 episodes	
2019	Hernán	Aisha	1 episode	
2021-2023	The Boarding School: Las Cumbres	Elvira	Main cast (seasons 1-3); 22 episodes	
2021	Élite historias breves: Nadia Guzmán	Nadia Shanaa	Main cast; 3 episodes	
2022	Stories to Stay Awake	Lua-Leylah	1 episode	
2023	Black Sunday	Kila	4 episodes	
2024	Silent Cargo	Andrea	3 episodes	
2025	The Olympia Clan	Trini	4 episodes	
2026	Lisbon Noir	Inspectora Nour	4 episodes	

=== Film ===
Year	Title	Role	Notes	Ref.
2022	Tomorrow is Today	Andrea	Supporting role	
2024	Raqqa: Spy vs. Spy	Malika	Lead role	
2025	Amira’s Land	Amira	Lead role	

=== Music videos ===
Year	Title	Artist	Role	Ref.
2018	"Final Feliz"	DANNA	Nadia Shanaa	
2019	"Oye Pablo"	DANNA	Herself	
2021	"La mujer cactús y el hombre globo"	Rayden	Cactus Woman	

== Awards and nominations ==
Year	Award	Category	Work	Result	Ref.
2026	34th Actors and Actresses Union Awards	Best Stage Actress in a Secondary Role	The Trojan Women	Won	
