= Amira's Land =

- Theatrical release poster
- Spanish: La tierra de Amira
- Directed by: Roberto Jiménez
- Screenplay by: Pedro García Ríos; Rodrigo Martín Antoranz
- Produced by: Antonio Hens; Bing Fang; César Martínez Herrada; Miguel Torrente
- Starring: Mina El Hammani; Manuel Morón; Pilar Gómez; Jorge de Juan; Joaquín Núñez
- Cinematography: Tote Trenas
- Edited by: Pablo Barce
- Music by: Claudia Lively
- Production companies: Dexiderius Producciones; Balance Media; Malas Compañías; La Tierra de Amira AIE
- Distributed by: Filmax
- Release dates: 24 October 2025 (Tudela); 5 December 2025 (Spain)
- Running time: 83 minutes
- Country: Spain
- Language: Spanish

Amira's Land (Spanish: La tierra de Amira) is a 2025 Spanish rural drama film directed by Roberto Jiménez (in his feature debut) starring Mina El Hammani and Manuel Morón.

== Plot ==
The plot follows the relationship established between Moroccan agricultural labourer Amira and lonely widower and landowner Justino, after Justino crashes on Amira and temporarily renders her unable to work and is thus forced by his sister Araceli to take care of her.

== Cast ==
- Mina El Hammani as Amira
- Manuel Morón as Justino
- Pilar Gómez as Araceli
- Jorge de Juan as Ramiro
- Joaquín Nuñez as Aurelio
- Alicia Mohíno as doctora Molina
- Mario Zorrilla as Pascual
- Chema del Barco as Paquito

== Production ==
The film was produced by Dexiderius Producciones, Balance Media, Malas Compañías, and La Tierra de Amira AIE. In addition to her acting role, Mina El Hammani also participated as an associate producer. Shooting locations included Gójar.

== Release ==
Amira's Land was the opening film of the 25th City of Tudela Opera Prima Film Festival in October 2025. It was also programmed at the 22nd Seville European Film Festival and the Almería International Film Festival (FICAL). Distributed by Filmax, it was released theatrically in Spain on 5 December 2025.

== Reception ==
Sergio F. Pinilla of Cinemanía rated the film 3 out of 5 stars, declaring it "imperfect but inspiring".

Manuel J. Lombardo of Diario de Sevilla gave the film a 1-star rating, lamenting that it "throws itself into the pit with its simplistic discourse and its schematic drama of humanistic aspirations".

Salvador Llopart of La Vanguardia rated the film 3 out of 5 stars, welcoming how El Hammani and Morón build "a simple, well-meaning, compassionate and, at times, moving" story.

== Accolades ==
Year	Award	Category	Nominee(s)	Result	Ref.
2026	5th Carmen Awards	Best Original Song	"La tierra de Amira" by Javier Ruibal	Nominated	

== See also ==
- List of Spanish films of 2025
