= Un lío de millones =

- Theatrical release poster
- Directed by: Susan Béjar
- Screenplay by: Ángela Armero; Susan Béjar
- Based on: Mes très chers enfants by Alexandra Leclère
- Produced by: Mariela Besuievsky; Gerardo Herrero
- Starring: Antonio Resines; Gracia Olayo; Alberto Olmo; Itzan Escamilla; Lucía Caraballo; Clara Lago; Bianca Kovacs; Raúl Cimas
- Cinematography: Kiko de la Rica
- Edited by: Ana Álvarez-Ossorio
- Music by: Vanessa Garde
- Production companies: Tornasol Media; Mis hijos valen oro AIE
- Distributed by: Sony Pictures Releasing de España
- Release date: 20 December 2024
- Country: Spain
- Language: Spanish

Un lío de millones is a 2024 Spanish comedy film directed by Susan Béjar from a screenplay co-written by Ángela Armero based on the French film Mes très chers enfants. It stars Antonio Resines, Gracia Olayo, Clara Lago, and Alberto Olmo.

== Plot ==
Affected by the empty nest syndrome, Bego and Agustín, a retired couple living in a village in the sierra of Madrid, feign to have won the lottery to draw the attention of their children, Miguel and Carla.

== Cast ==
- Antonio Resines as Agustín
- Gracia Olayo as Bego
- Alberto Olmo as Miguel
- Itzan Escamilla as Sergio
- Lucía Caraballo as Paula
- Clara Lago as Carla
- Bianca Kovacs as Milena
- Raúl Cimas as Cyro

== Production ==
Written by Susan Béjar and Ángela Armero, the screenplay of Un lío de millones is based on the French film Mes très chers enfants, written and directed by Alexandra Leclère. Originally known under the working title of Mis hijos valen oro, the film was produced by Tornasol Media and Mis hijos valen oro AIE, and it had the association of Sony Pictures Entertainment Iberia and the participation of RTVE and Movistar Plus+. Shooting locations in Navarre included Pamplona.

== Release ==
Distributed by Sony Pictures, the film is scheduled to be released theatrically in Spain on 20 December 2024.

== See also ==
- List of Spanish films of 2024
