= Martina Cariddi =

Spanish actress

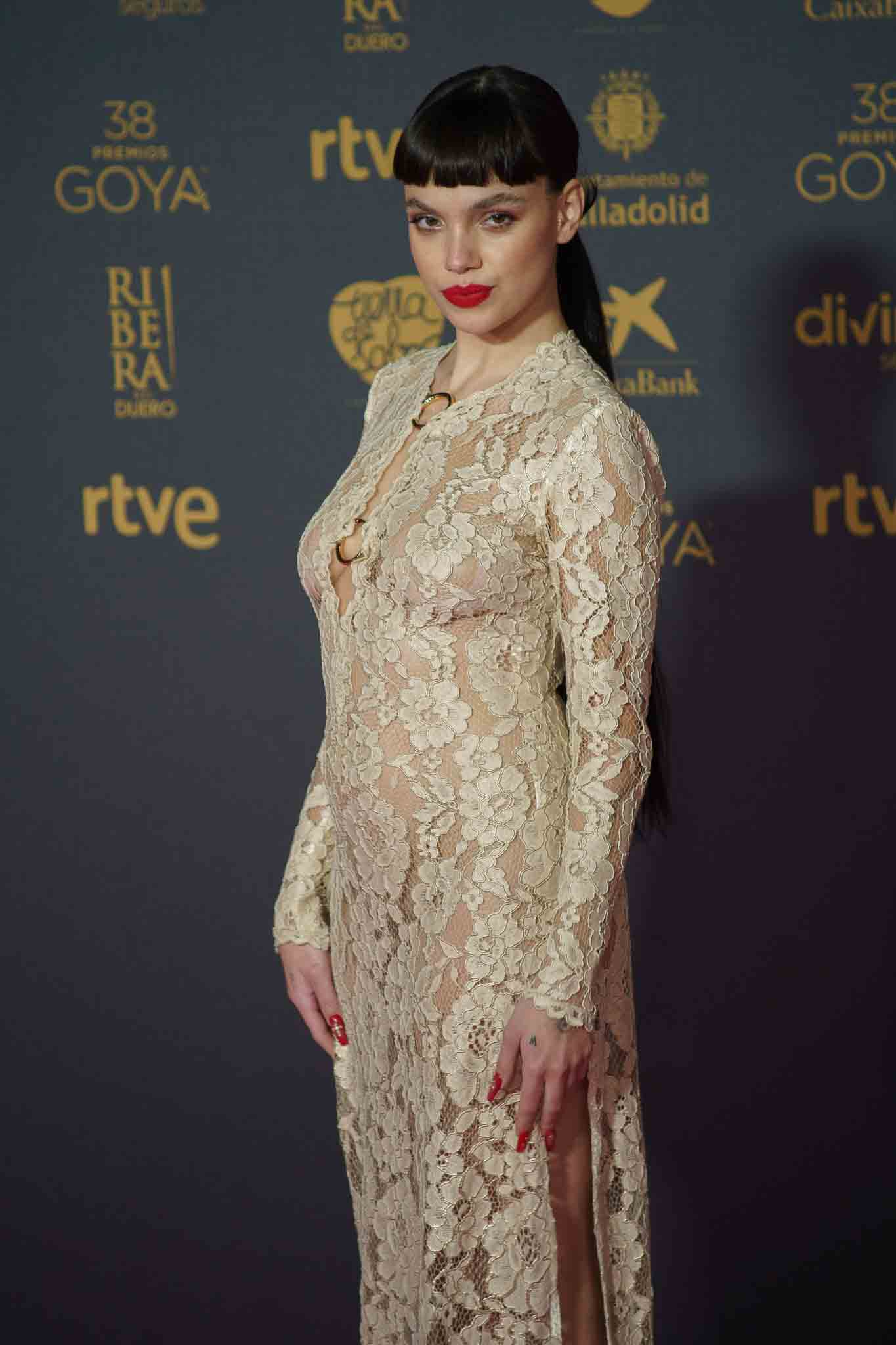
- Cariddi in 2024
- Born: Martina Basanta Cariddi; 30 May 2001 (age 25); Madrid, Spain
- Occupation: Actress
- Years active: 2017–present

Martina Basanta Cariddi (born 30 May 2001) is a Spanish-Italian film and television actress known for her role as Mencía Blanco in the Netflix series Élite.

== Biography ==
Martina was born on 30 May 2001, in Chamartín, Madrid, to a Spanish father and Italian mother.

== Career ==
In 2010, Cariddi entered the world of acting by studying theatre at the Escuela Municipal de Arte Dramático de Madrid. Later, She enrolled in Cristina Rota's Centro de Nuevos Creadores, where she took basic acting courses, and in the Juan Codina Studio, taking a course in dramatic art. In 2017, she made her first foray into the acting world in the film El guardián invisible, directed by Fernando González Molina.

In 2018, she appeared in an episode of season 19 of Cuéntame cómo pasó, playing Laura. A year later, she played a small role in the feature film Mientras dure la guerra by Alejandro Amenábar. In 2021, she starred in Luis Grajera’s short film Muere padre muere.

Her inclusion in the fourth season of the Netflix series Élite, where she played Mencía Blanco, was announced in 2020.

In 2023, she starred in Quevedo's "Columbia", directed by Felix Bollain.

== Filmography ==
=== Film ===
Year	Title	Role	Directed by	Notes
2017	El guardián invisible	Bus girl	Fernando González Molina	Acting debut
2019	Mientras dure la guerra	Concha	Alejandro Amenábar	
2021	Muere padre muere	Eva	Luis Grajera	Short film

=== Television ===
Year	Title	Role	Channel	Duration
2018	Cuéntame cómo pasó	Laura	TVE	1 episode
2021 - 2022	Élite	Mencía Blanco Commerford	Netflix	Main (seasons 4-6), 24 episodes
2021	Élite: historias breves: Patrick	Mencía Blanco Commerford	Netflix	Main, 3 episodes

=== Programs ===
Year	Title	Role	Channel	Notes
2021	El Show de Martina	Host	YouTube, Netflix	Élite backstage
