= Irene Zoe Alameda =

Spanish writer, filmmaker, composer

- Born: Madrid, Spain
- Occupations: Writer and filmmaker
- Writing career
- Pen name: Amy Martin, Galatha
- Notable works: La cinta de Álex, Sueños itinerantes, Uniformadas, WA, últimos días de Warla Alkman
- Website: irenezoealameda.com

Irene Zoe Alameda is a Spanish writer and filmmaker. Her feature film "La cinta de Álex" (Alex's Strip) won the Best Picture award at the 2020 Winter Film Awards in New York. The movie was considered one of the best "operas prima" of Spanish cinema (Fotogramas). She is also the acclaimed author of the books: "Antrópolis" (2017), "WA. Ultimos Dias de Warla Alkman"(2013), and "Sueños itinerantes" (2004)

== Biography ==
A writer and filmmaker, she holds a PhD in literature from Columbia University. She previously studied Hispanic philology at Complutense University of Madrid and spent four semesters as Erasmus at the Rheinische Friedrich-Wilhelms-Universität Bonn, where she was later hired as a lecturer of Spanish. She has worked as a professor and researcher at the University of Bonn, Suffolk University, the Universidad Carlos III de Madrid, the Spanish National Research Council, and at George Washington University.

She is the Founder and CEO of the production company Storylines Projects, since 2008. She was the director of Instituto Cervantes in Stockholm (Sweden) between 2009 and 2010. El País op-ed contributor, she also writes for ElCotidiano and Culturamas.

In 2012 she moved to the United States, where she currently works as a university professor and as a producer, writer and filmmaker.

== Movies ==
Her feature film La cinta de Alex (Spain/US 2020) won the Best Picture and Best Actress Awards at the 2020 Winter Film Awards in NY, and was also nominated for the Best Director. It also won awards at the Las Vegas Film Awards (US, 2020), Golden Movie Awards (UK, 2020), Jaipur International Film Festival (India, 2020), Bucharest Film Awards (Romania, 2020), Cyprus International Film Festival (Cyprus, 2019), Festival Internacional de Cine de Almeria (Spain, 2019). The original movie soundtrack, and the single "The Protester" were released worldwide.

Her short Uniformed (Uniformadas) (Spain 2010) has received important international awards, such as Best Short Film at the Film Femmes Méditerranée (France, 2012), Ebensee (Austria, 2012), Milano (Italy, 2011), Festival de Cine de Alicante (Spain 2011), Malescorto (Italy, 2011), Laguardia Film Festival (Spain, 2011), Inquietarte (Spain, 2011), Festival del Mar (Spain, 2011), FICII11 (Chile, 2011), and Pecca de Oro (Spain, 2011), and her script was awarded at the Mediterranean Short Film Festival (Morocco, 2011) and Laguardia (Spain, 2011). It was also candidate to Best Short Film at the Spanish Film Academy's Goya Awards (2010).

Her short film Buen Viaje(Spain 2008), received numerous awards and was screened in several film festivals both in Spain and around the world, such as the Malaga Film Festival, the Iberian Film Festival of Badajoz, the Torrelavega Film Festival, Cinesul do Brasil, Festroia-Portugal, San Diego Latino Film Festival, the Bogota Film Festival and the Rochester Film Festival.

She has also written, directed, produced and composed the original soundtrack for her other short films: Tarde de homenaje (US 2002) and Jaisalmer (India 2012).

== Books ==
In addition to her cinematographic career, she has published several short stories and four books: the novels Sueños Itinerantes (Seix Barral, 2004), WA. Últimos días de Warla Alkman (Edhasa, 2013), and the essay books The Neopicaresque Novel in the Post-War Era (Michigan University Press, 2004) and Artista y Criminal (Castalia, 2011).

Her novel Itinerant Dreams was critically acclaimed and the author was said to show “portentous registries, incommensurate ambition, unstoppable verbal potential and an invisible style capable of depicting the mental unhinging of our time” (Francisco Solano, EL PAÍS).

Irene Zoe Alameda worked on her second novel "WA, últimos días de Warla Alkman" for nine years. It combines traditional literary texts, music, videos, bidi codes and internet links to actual sites, all created by a single author. On January 4, 2013, the publisher of the novel, Daniel Fernandez (President of Edhasa and President of Spanish Editor's Association) announced that the publication of WA. WA, últimos días de Warla Alkman would be one of the major literary events of the year. In his own words, Warla Alkman was “a risky, but extremely brilliant metaliterary novel”.

In her latest interview about the novel, the writer Irene Zoe Alameda explained that using a pseudonism was a real attempt to eliminate the barriers between truth and fiction. She wanted that her novel "WA, últimos días de Warla Alkman" became a major novelty and transcended the limits of traditional literature. She wanted to go beyond the traditional format of the novel and create a Digital Hybrid Global Fiction (Dhyglofiction). As she explained, this is why she combined new techniques of expression, and decided to create alter egos as real characters, including the pop star Galatha and the best-selling writer Amy Martin.

This pathbreaking multimedia novel was launched in two public events held at FNAC in Madrid and Barcelona in January 2014, with the participation of Juan Cruz, the deputy director of El Pais, and the writer David Barba.

The novel received support of the literary critics. For example, José Romero Barea wrote in Luz Cultural that "Irene Zoe Alameda belongs to that family of authors who need to break free of the limitations of the literary tradition". He also wrote the following: "Reaching the end of Warla (and her brother) is worth it. The last pages are excellent and they justify the search of the hero, that doomed character dancing on the border of an abyss" (José de María Romero Barea). In the review published by Ricardo Senabre in El Cultural from newspaper El Mundo, he acknowledged that Irene Zoe Alameda "is without any doubt a talented writer, but maybe excessively ambitious". He also considered the novel as pretentious, with notes of erudition at random places.

Her latest books are: Conexión Senegal (published by the EMT Home (Spanish Public Transportation Authority, and distributed 10,000 copies among EMT users and the book of poems "Antropolis".

Prior to that, he has also translated into Spanish the book of poems Escena de amor en limusina y compañía (New Model Books, 2002), and the novels La fiera indomable (Martínez Roca, 2007) and Obras Selectas de T.S. Spivet (Seix Barral, 2010).

== Writing under a Pseudonym ==
On January 23, 2013, the newspaper El Mundo published a scoop informing that the novelist Irene Zoe Alameda had been using the nickname Amy Martin. Articles and reportages using this nickname had been published by the Ideas Foundation (a think tank)in the online section of its webpage entitled “Amy Martin Global Observer”. Alameda issued a public statement and recognized to the Spanish newspaper El País that she was the author behind Amy Martin. She explained that this was part of a performance to create real characters and go beyond the limits of reality and fiction, in her forthcoming new novel "WA, últimos días de Warla Alkman". On January, she donated all the money that her literary agent charged to the Ideas Foundation, to avoid further media controversy.

The reportages and articles signed by Amy Martin span several topics, from the movie industry in Nigeria, to the accident in Fukushima. They are available online.

As Amy Martin, she had also coauthored the book 55 Terms For Progress / 55 Términos Para El Progreso (Spain, Fundación Ideas, 2011) and collaborated with newspaper Público. These works are available in her webpage.

== Music and Reber ==
Irene Zoe Alameda is also a music composer and a performer. She is the author of the movie soundtracks in A Tribute's Evening, Have a Nice Trip and Uniformed.

In 2011 she founded electropop band Reber, composed of two musician siblings Galatha and Golem (musical alter egos of Irene Zoe Alameda and her brother Daniel Alameda). Their first album Who Reads Future? was released in July 2012. Their songs There UR, Julia, Think of Me and The Protester played in radio stations in Spain. The group gave concerts in Madrid, Barcelona and San Sebastian. Their futuristic videos are followed by thousands of fans around the world in the Reber channel in YouTube.

A new single called Mad City and a new video were released in December 2014 ), as part of their new album The Future Maker which was presented in February 2015, and given for free download to fans on Valentine's Day.

She has released 2 music album, Who Reads Future? (2012) and The Future Maker (2014) with the band of synth pop Reber, where she performs as Galatha and where she has written all the songs. According to Onda Pop radio conductor Jesús María López, "Galatha's cold and robotic voice combines perfectly with Reber's retro-futuristic rhythm, which features the most intimate Beck and the most dazzling vibe of The Killers".

== Awards ==
Year	Award	Festival	Film
2013	Best Short Documentary	Certamen Soundub, Madrid – Spain	Jaisalmer
2012	Best Short Film – Audience Award	Film Femmes Méditerranée, France	Uniformadas
2012	Best Short Film	Festival of Nations, Ebensee – Austria	Uniformadas
2011	Best Script	Mediterranean Short Film Festival, Tangier – Morocco (Centre Cinématographique Marocain)	Uniformadas
2011	Best Short Film	Malescorto Film Festival, Italy	Uniformadas
2011	Best Short Film	Inquietarte Festival, Spain	Uniformadas
2011	Second Award	Pentedattilo Film Festival, Reggio Calabria – Italy	Uniformadas
2011	Best Short Film	Festival de MILANO – Italy	Uniformadas
2011	Best Short Film	Festival del Mar – Mallorca, Spain	Uniformadas
2011	Best Short Movie – Critics Award, and Best Short Film (Third Award)	Festival de Cine de Alicante – Spain	Uniformadas
2011	Best Short Film, Best Script, Best Cinematography	Laguardia Film Festival, La Rioja – Spain	Uniformadas
2011	Best Short Film	FICIIQQ – Chile	Uniformadas
2011	Best Short Film	Pecca de Oro, Seville – Spain	Uniformadas
2010	Candidate to Best Short Film	GOYA Awards – Spanish Film Academy, Spain	Uniformadas
2010	Honorary Mention	Rochester Film Festival, UK	Buen Viaje
2009	Best Short Film	Calasparra International Short Film Festival, Spain	Buen Viaje
